= Gaqo Çako =

Background information
- Born: 24 January 1935; Korçë, Kingdom of Albania
- Died: 1 August 2018 (aged 83) Tirana, Albania
- Genres: Classical music, light music
- Occupation: Tenor
- Years active: 1961–2004
- Award: People's Artist

Gaqo Çako (24 January 1935 – 1 August 2018) was an Albanian operatic tenor, awarded with the People's Artist of Albania title. He has been ranked among the best opera singers of Albania, along with Ramiz Kovaçi and Mentor Xhemali.

== Career ==
Çako was born in 1935 in Korçë, southern Albania, where he spent his early childhood. His family then moved to Kuçovë, and eventually he enrolled in the Jordan Misja Artistic Lyceum in Tirana. Çako studied during 1957–1961 in the Moscow Conservatory under Anna Soloviova. In 1961, after returning to Albania, he started to work at the National Theatre of Opera and Ballet of Albania, where he would become the leading tenor for the three ensuing decades. He also pursued a specialization degree in the 1960s at the Accademia Nazionale di Santa Cecilia, in Rome, Italy. In his career, he performed lead singing roles in Bellini's Norma, Verdi's La traviata and Rigoletto, and Puccini's La bohème, among others. He appeared in operas by Albanian composers, such as Mrika by Prenkë Jakova, Lulja e kujtimit (transl. The flower of Memory) by Kristo Kono, Pranvera (transl. The spring) by Tish Daija, Heroina (transl. The heroines) by Vangjo Nova, Skënderbeu (transl. Skanderbeg) by Prenkë Jakova, Bijtë e Skënderbeut (transl. Skanderbeg's sons) by Abdulla Grimci, Komisari (transl. The commissary) by Nikolla Zoraqi, Zgjimi (transl. The rise) by Tonin Harapi, and Toka e jonë (transl. Our land), by Pjetër Gaci. He was well known on Italian stages as well.

Although Çako was an opera tenor, he became popular through 28 participations at the Festivali i Këngës, and won first prizes in the 1967, 1970, and 1978 editions.

== Personal life ==
Çako's wife, Luiza Papa, was a notable opera singer. Their only son, Pirro Çako, is a singer as well. Gaqo Çako was father-in-law of international soprano Inva Mula, daughter of composer Avni Mula, until Pirro and Inva divorced.
