= List of Albanian composers =

This is a list of Albanian music composers.

== Folk and contemporary ==
- Palokë Kurti (1858–1920)
- Kristo Kono (1907–1991)
- Rexho Mulliqi (1923–1982)
- Avni Mula (1928–2020)
- Agim Krajka (1937–2021)
- Vasil Tole (born 1963)
- Pirro Çako (1965)
- Flori Mumajesi (1982)

== Classical and film ==
- Martin Gjoka (1890–1940)
- Mikel Koliqi (1902–1997)
- Lorenc Antoni (1909–1991)
- Prenkë Jakova (1917–1969)
- Nikolla Zoraqi (1921–1991)
- Mustafa Krantja (1921–2002)
- Koço Uçi (1923–1982)
- Simon Gjoni (1925–1991)
- Tonin Harapi (1925–1991)
- Tish Daija (1926–2004)
- Çesk Zadeja (1927–1997)
- Feim Ibrahimi (1935–1997)
- Gjon Simoni (1936–1999)
- Limoz Dizdari (1942)
- Lejla Agolli (born 1950)
- Aleksandër Peçi (1951)
- David Tukiçi (1956)
- Thomas Simaku (1958)
- Endri Sina (born 1967)
