= Festivali i Këngës =

Albanian song contest

- Genre: Various
- Dates: December
- Locations: Tirana, Albania
- Years active: 1962–present
- Organizer: Radio Televizioni Shqiptar (RTSH)
- Website: rtsh.al/festivali/

Festivali i Këngës në RTSH (Albanian: [fɛstiˈvali i ˈkəŋɡəs nə ɾətəˈʃə]; transl. "The Song Festival on RTSH"), commonly known as Festivali i Këngës and also referred to as simply FiK or Fest, is an annual music competition in Albania organised by the national broadcaster Radio Televizioni Shqiptar (RTSH). Broadcast every year since its inauguration in 1962, the festival has determined the country's representative to the Eurovision Song Contest since 2004.

Various singing presentations have been used throughout its history, beginning with radio-only performances in the first few years, then expanding to live performances, playback, remakes, and duets featuring other singers. The winners have traditionally been selected by a jury. However, other voting methods have also been applied, such as televoting or regional juries. At times, the head juror has carried twice the voting power of other jurors.

Vaçe Zela holds the record for most victories in the competition with eleven wins followed by Tonin Tërshana with four wins and Aurela Gaçe, Manjola Nallbani, and Elsa Lila with three wins. The most recent winner is Alis, who won the 64th edition of the contest.

== History ==
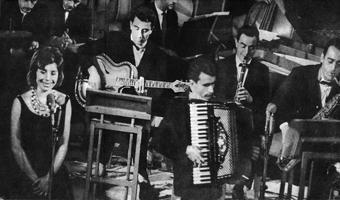
Vaçe Zela performing at the 11th edition of Festivali i Këngës in 1972.

The first edition of Festivali i Këngës took place on 21 December 1962 at the High Institute of Arts in Tirana and was won by Vaçe Zela performing the song titled "Fëmija i parë". The contest's entries, under communism, were strictly centered around light music. Over time, neutrally-themed entries started to be used as a tool for the governing Party of Labour of Albania in promoting its ideals.

The 1972 edition was a turning point for the contest, in which dictator Enver Hoxha prosecuted the organisers of Festivali i Këngës 11 after declaring them "enemies of the public". They were accused of endangering the country with "immoral aspects" in their songs and performances. This incident began a period of extreme pressure and censorship, with the ruling Communist Party imposing numerous sanctions on the contest's creativity and strict censorship on anything deemed inappropriate by the government. This ranged from limiting the type of clothes artists could wear, to restricting their range of movement while performing. The main organisers of the show were accused of conspiring against the country and corrupting its youth. The songs were highly monitored and the topics were generally related to the country's development or the government and its main figures.

After Hoxha's death in 1985, the change in lyrics was very abrupt and censorship began to relax. Nertila Koka and Anita Bitri quickly became known for their songs about love, while Parashqevi Simaku, Irma Libohova and Morena Reka also engaged the youth with progressively more liberal political entries year after year. Rock groups such as Tingulli i Zjarrtë had a considerable impact with the message of their songs and the introduction of rock music to the Albanian music scene, a genre which has endured successfully to this day and can easily be spotted even in modern FiK entries, many of which feature electric guitars. This liberalisation was allowed by the silent consent of the Communist Party leadership all along, primarily as a result of their realisation that the days of communism in Eastern Europe were coming to an end. The general public, however, was less aware of the imminence of such changes to the political order, making the performances have a puzzling effect that provoked both feelings of outrage and hope. Although Albania was the last country in Eastern Europe to part with communist rule in 1992, FiK entries were ringing the bells of change already by 1988.

After the fall of communism, Festivali i Këngës had a temporary boost in both quality and diversity. The winning songs reflected the transitional period that the country was undergoing. The 1991 winner, Ardit Gjebrea with "Jon", and the 1992 winner, Osman Mula's entry sung by Aleksandër Gjoka, Manjola Nallbani and Viktor Tahiraj titled "Pesha e fatit" ("The weight of fate") were centred on immigration and freedom, coinciding with the state of affairs in Albania at the time. During this period, the contest was also introduced to the word "God" for the first time. Prior to that, religion was illegal and the word was not allowed to be pronounced in public. The participation of Albanian singers from outside the country's borders was also an addition to the history of the festival during this decade. Before that, the country was in a period of isolation. The clothing and performances of the singers became more extravagant as time went by, with singers such as Bleona Qereti, Ledina Çelo and Adelina Ismajli being among the most notable trendsetters of the new era.

In 1996, the stage of Festivali i Këngës welcomed newcomer Elsa Lila, who won the contest with "Pyes lotin" ("I ask the tear") in 1996 and again the following year with "Larg urrejtjes" ("Away from the hatred") in 1997. These songs mirrored the country's difficult reality following the collapse of the pyramid schemes, an event which wreaked havoc all throughout Albania. Despite the difficult times, Festivali i Këngës never stopped its broadcast and went ahead as scheduled during the final weeks of December, as it has done for every year since its inception.

In 1998, Albërie Hadërgjonaj became the first Kosovar-Albanian singer to win the contest with the ballad "Mirësia dhe e vërteta" ("Goodness and truth"). The song had a humanitarian anti-war message and is often referred to locally as a song for Kosovo, relating to the 1998–99 war.

Up until 1999, Festivali i Këngës was the biggest music event in Albania. Its popularity began to waver after the introduction of other competitions such as Top Fest and Kënga Magjike, which were more liberal with their entry and singer selections, and eventually began to produce higher ratings. However, with Albania's introduction to the Eurovision Song Contest in 2004, Festivali i Këngës quickly began producing a greater degree of national and international interest. The festival also received a boost of audience with the participation of newcomers from said competitions, such as Anjeza Shahini, who had won the Ethet e së Premtes Mbrëma (Albanian Idol) talent show a few months prior to competing in FiK and was popular with the public for her voice and stage presence.

=== Eurovision Song Contest ===
Anjeza Shahini won the 42nd edition of Festivali i Këngës, placing hopeful professional singer Mariza Ikonomi in second place. Mariza boycotted the stage when the results were announced in a sign of disappointment. Much was at stake in this edition, as the winner would be the first ever representative of Albania in the Eurovision Song Contest. Anjeza went on to sing at the Eurovision Song Contest 2004, finishing in 7th place with the song "The Image of You". Ever since, more international interest in the festival has emerged, with Eurovision fans from Europe and beyond increasingly following the contest through live internet streams and satellite feeds. Every year, hashtags related to Festivali i Këngës have trended on Twitter in many European countries during the live final. Festivali i Këngës is usually the first national selection process of the Eurovision season, where countries reveal their competing entries for the main contest in May. Due to it commonly being held around Christmas week, Eurovision fans refer to this time period as "FiKmas".

Albania's best result in Eurovision to date has been by Kosovo-Albanian singer Rona Nishliu with the song "Suus", ranking 2nd in the semi-final and 5th in the final of the Eurovision Song Contest 2012.

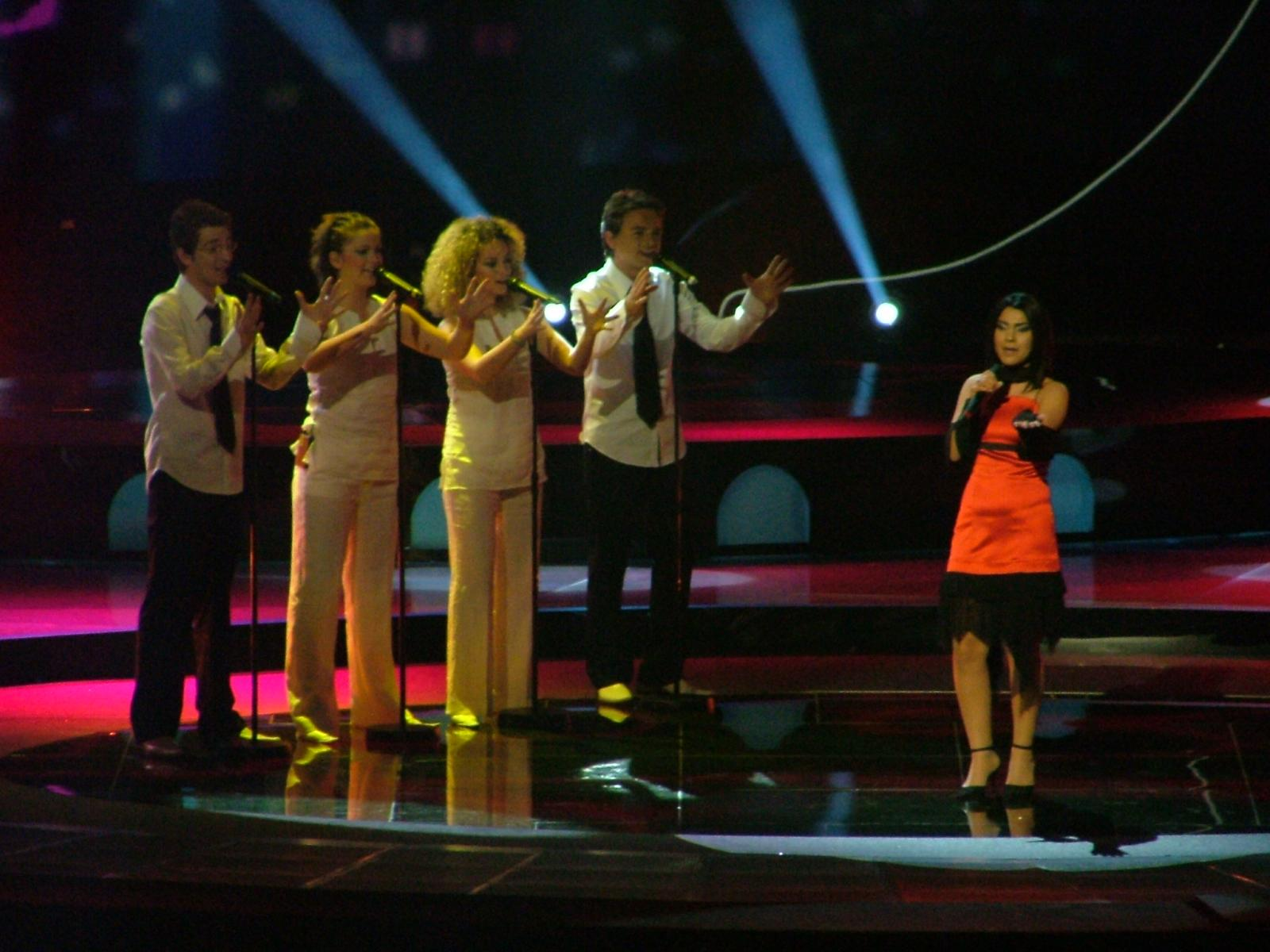
Anjeza Shahini represented Albania in the Eurovision Song Contest 2004 in Istanbul.

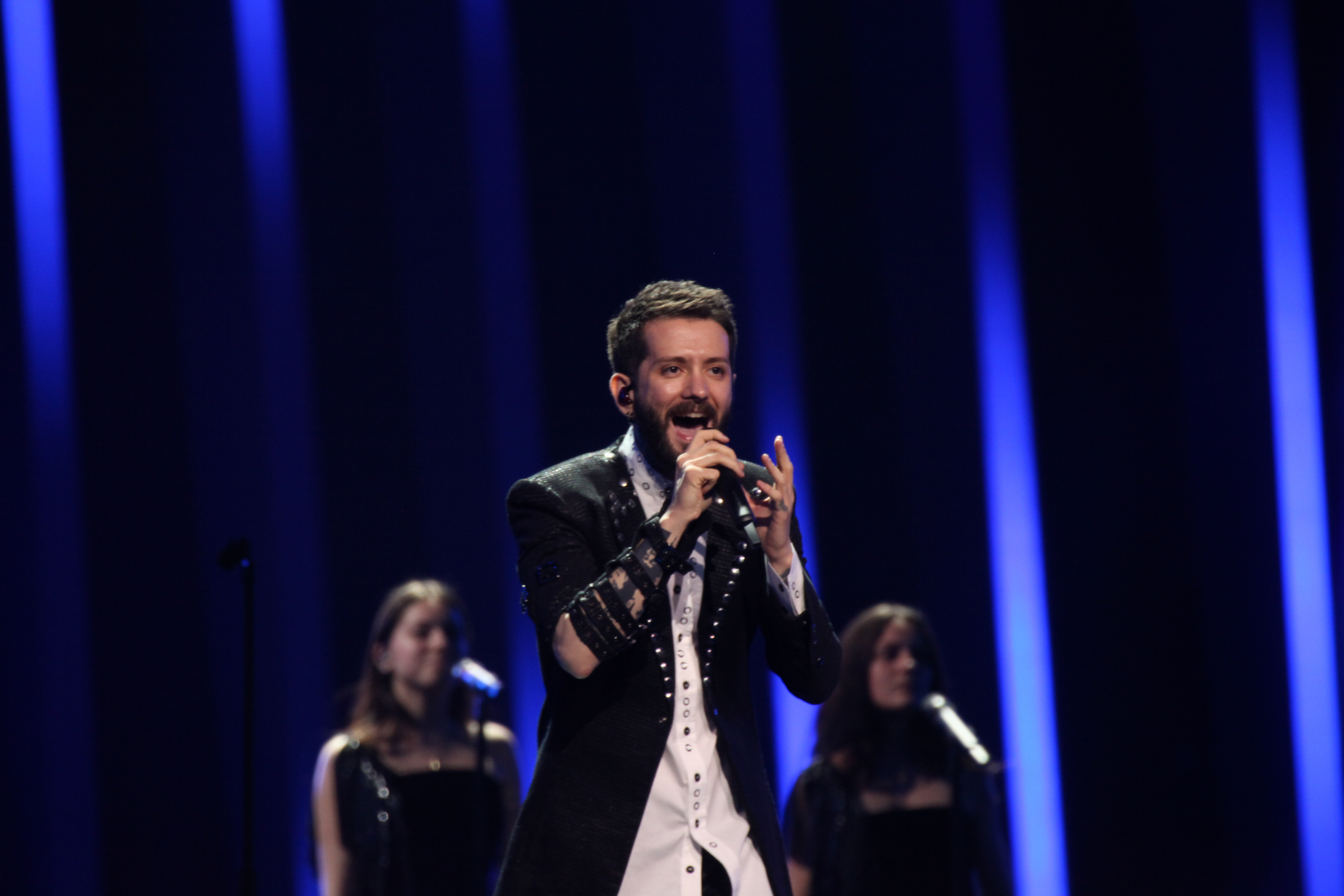
Eugent Bushpepa represented Albania in the Eurovision Song Contest 2018 in Lisbon.

Year	Artist(s)	Song	Final		Semi	
Year	Artist(s)	Song	Place	Points	Place	Points
2004	Anjeza Shahini	"The Image of You"	7	106	4	167
2005	Ledina Çelo	"Tomorrow i Go"	16	53	Automatic qualifier	
2006	Luiz Ejlli	"Zjarr e ftohtë"	Failed to qualify		14	58
2007	Frederik Ndoci	"Hear My Plea"	Failed to qualify		17	49
2008	Olta Boka	"Zemrën e lamë peng"	17	55	9	67
2009	Kejsi Tola	"Carry Me in Your Dreams"	17	48	7	73
2010	Juliana Pasha	"It's All About You"	16	62	6	76
2011	Aurela Gaçe	"Feel the Passion"	Failed to qualify		14	47
2012	Rona Nishliu	"Suus"	5	146	2	146
2013	Adrian Lulgjuraj & Bledar Sejko	"Identitet"	Failed to qualify		15	31
2014	Hersi Matmuja	"One Night's Anger"	Failed to qualify		15	22
2015	Elhaida Dani	"I'm Alive"	17	34	10	62
2016	Eneda Tarifa	"Fairytale"	Failed to qualify		16	45
2017	Lindita	"World"	Failed to qualify		14	76
2018	Eugent Bushpepa	"Mall"	11	184	8	162
2019	Jonida Maliqi	"Ktheju tokës"	17	90	9	96
2020	Arilena Ara	"Fall from the Sky"	Contest cancelled due to the COVID-19 pandemic			
2021	Anxhela Peristeri	"Karma"	21	57	10	112
2022	Ronela Hajati	"Sekret"	Failed to qualify		12	58
2023	Albina & Familja Kelmendi	"Duje"	22	76	9	83
2024	Besa	"Titan"	Failed to qualify		15	14
2025	Shkodra Elektronike	"Zjerm"	8	218	2	122
2026	Alis	"Nân"	13	145	7	158

== Trivia ==
- In the early editions of Festivali i Këngës, each song would be interpreted two or three times by different singers. However, only one of the versions sung would be declared the winner.
- In 1980, it was rumoured that the government had intervened in the selection of the winner, giving the victory to "Shoqet tona ilegale" ("Our illegal friends") by Vaçe Zela over "Njerëzit e agimeve" ("People of the mornings") by Alida Hisku. While the first is a song honouring undercover friendships among partisans during the time of the national liberation of Albania from Nazi forces, the latter makes strong references to intellectual awakening and enlightenment ideas, concepts deemed strongly in contrast with the philosophy of Enver Hoxha's dictatorship.
- In 1987, it was said that Kozma Dushi with the song "Lot me ty o djalë" ("Hey boy we cry with you") was set to be declared the winner, however minutes before the jury made their decision, Hoxha's wife Nexhmije said that she did not want that song to win, so another song was chosen.
- In 1994, Mariza Ikonomi became the youngest singer to compete in the festival at the age of 12, in a duet with Françesk Radi and their song "Telefonatë zemrash" ("Phone call of hearts").
- In 1995, the song "E doni dashurinë" ("Do you want love") by Luan Zhegu and Ledina Çelo was reported to be the most applauded song in Festivali i Këngës history to date, with a total applause time of 7 minutes and 11 seconds.
- In 1998 the first Kosovar-Albanian singer, Albërie Hadërgjonaj, with the song "Mirësia dhe e vërteta" ("Goodness and truth"), was declared the winner.
- In 1999, the song "Apokalipsi" ("The Apocalypse") by Irma and Eranda Libohova was initially declared the winner instead of Aurela Gaçe's "S'jam tribu" ("I'm not a tribute") due to a miscalculation of the jury votes.
- In 2016, hologram technology was used to bring back a performance by Vaçe Zela as a tribute, almost three years after the singer's death.
- In October 2023, Kosovan broadcaster RTK launched a format with the same title, with the long-term aim of also using it as their national selection for the Eurovision Song Contest in case the country becomes eligible to compete.

== Incidents ==
- In 1963, Besnik Taraneshi was the first singer to be prosecuted by the dictatorship, ahead of many to come throughout the history of the festival. This was due to his mispronunciation of a word in the song "Djaloshi dhe shiu" ("The boy and the rain").
- In 1964, head of the jury Llazar Siliqi decided that no first place would be awarded, due to the low quality of the songs. Instead, "Dritaren kërkoj" by Vaçe Zela was awarded second place, and two other songs awarded third place.
- In 1972, Enver Hoxha called the organisers of Festivali i Këngës 11 "enemies of The people", a name given to all the subjects who he considered a danger to the country. Many of them were prosecuted after being accused of endangering the country's mentality by introducing immoral aspects to the show, and plotting against the government by influencing the Albanian youth of the time. RTSH general director Todi Lubonja, the festival's director Mihal Luarasi and singer Sherif Merdani were sentenced and would remain imprisoned for sixteen years until 1989, while many of the others involved were banned from working in television and/or were deported to remote Albanian cities. The claims were out of context and the punishments were used as an example for future organisers. Skifter Këlliçi wrote a book about this, titled Festivali i Njëmbëdhjetë (The 11th Festival).
- In 1997, Alma Bektashi had a wardrobe malfunction on stage when her dress fell off, revealing her breast. The cameras managed to avoid the incident.
- In 1999, Irma and Eranda Libohova left the Palace of Congresses early, thinking that their song "Apokalipsi" would not win. The song was initially declared as the winner, however, a miscalculation of the jury votes announced the following day by head juror Vaçe Zela revealed that Aurela Gaçe's "S'jam tribu" had won instead.
- In 2003, singer Mariza Ikonomi, who was eager to represent Albania for the first time in the Eurovision Song Contest, left the venue in sign of protest when it was announced that her entry "Mbi urë" ("Over a bridge") had ranked second, losing to Anjeza Shahini's "Imazhi yt".
- In 2004, the producers of the song "Nesër shkoj" filed a lawsuit against Ledina Çelo because she had signed a contract with a phone company without previously consulting them. She was also accused of not attending the conferences set up by the producers and that she had not rehearsed the song enough. The suit was dropped within the week that it was filed.
- In 2006, Greta Koçi's disappointment for her fifth placing with the song "Eja zemër" made her to burst out in tears, while her mother accused the festival's jury with of corruption and incompetence.
- In 2007, Blero dropped out of the competition, claiming that he was asked for a large amount of money in exchange of a victory by an anonymous caller. He also claimed that the first three positions were already decided by the organisers prior to the event. The jury and the festival administration replied in a press statement that it was Blero who had asked for the first prize by sending an SMS which stated that he would withdraw if his victory was not guaranteed.
- Also in 2007, Manjola Nallbani accused the festival authorities that they had sabotaged her song, claiming that her voice was not heard at all by the public. This was confirmed by the general director of the festival Zamira Koleci. Nallbani declared that she would no longer participate in this event and called certain organisers "mafiosos".
- The 2007 edition also provoked a huge public reaction and massive press attention after the song "Jeta kërkon dashuri" ("Life needs love") by Flaka Krelani and Doruntina Disha placed second, prompting corruption accusations to jury members Gjergj Xhuvani and Alban Skënderaj. The two had not given any points to this song, while four judges had awarded it maximum points and Rudina Magjistari had awarded it the second highest points. General director Zamira Koleci, in a press interview, called the two judges "gangsters and racists" after their boycott of the song from the Kosovo Albanian singers. Edmond Zhulali, composer of the song and artistic director of FiK, submitted a request to the RTSH council for the jury's votes to be discounted. The council however turned down this request.
- In 2013, an alleged change in the contractual agreement between the festival and Kosovo model Diellza Kolgeci, initially designated as the female host for FiK 52, led to Kolgeci withdrawing from her hosting duties just days before the live show. She stated that the original terms of her contract included the costs of lodging and other amenities for her personal assistant, however the modified version did not, citing a suspicious lack of funds in the festival's budget following a change of directors. The festival responded to the controversy by airing a satirical ad featuring male host Enkel Demi appearing upset at the news of Kolgeci's withdrawal, and three replacement female hosts, model Marinela Meta, Miss Albania 2011 Xhesika Berberi, and actress Klea Huta.
- In 2014, the contest's organisers had problems at successfully booking their guest singer for their interval act. After Conchita Wurst's refusal earlier in December due to a busy schedule, Alexander Rybak, who initially accepted FiK's offer to perform, also pulled out at the last minute after his composed entry in the Belarusian national final failed to secure a victory. Reactions by fans were mixed, with some accusing unprofessionalism. FiK organizers ultimately relied on jury members Genc Dashi and Rona Nishliu to fill in for Rybak, as Dashi improvised on the guitar, while Nishliu paid tribute to Vaçe Zela, who had died earlier in February. It was also rumored that the opening act of the grand final, consisting of a well-liked violin reprise of past FiK entries, was the organisers' ironic response to Rybak's last-minute cancellation.
- In 2015, Edea Demaliaj's song "Era" ("The wind"), composed by Adrian Hila and written by Pandi Laço, was disqualified by the festival's directors, despite being included in the initial list of competing entries, due to the lyricist Laço also being the contest's host. Hila expressed his discontent when interviewed on the TV show Oktapod. Meanwhile, singer Edea Demaliaj dropped out of the competition after finding herself without a song; her replacement was Orgesa Zaimi, whose entry had not qualified during the internal pre-selection stage.
- Also in 2015, Eneda Tarifa's victory reignited allegations of bias and corruption by the jury and the festival's organizers, as media and critics attributed Tarifa's win to her close friendship and joint business venture with FiK's current artistic director Elton Deda, rather than on her merit versus the competition. The jury's integrity had previously been questioned when 22 entries, rather than the planned 18, were qualified for the grand final, raising suspicions that certain singers had passed on to the final based on name recognition rather than song quality. Further adding to the scrutiny was that, instead of revealing the full set of votes from every juror, the festival regressed to its old practice of mentioning only the top ranked songs in the final, circumventing any individual responsibility for potentially compromised jurors in the process. The controversial victory of Eneda Tarifa brought to the forefront an old spat that the singer had once had with Albanian LGBT rights defender Kristi Pinderi, when he had publicly challenged Tarifa's moral standards after she had lashed out against Conchita Wurst's triumph in Eurovision 2014. At the time, Tarifa had initially complained that music itself had been eclipsed by Conchita's win, but in a subsequent statement she elaborated that the Eurovision Song Contest was not spreading the correct set of values to its European audience, and that certain LGBT groups were lobbying for attention and exposure in the contest. Her fragmented reaction, along with her concerns on how to explain "Conchita" to her family, were dismissed by Pinderi as embellished homophobia on her part.
- In 2016, controversy arose over the festival's decision not to follow through with the announced 60% jury and 40% public voting ratio during the final. Instead, the public vote counted only for 1/13th of the final result. Under a 60/40 split, Lindita would have tied with Ylli Limani at 120 points, requiring tie-breaking procedures to determine the winner. It is worth noting that Lindita received votes from 11 jurors compared to Limani's 7, and received top scores from 5 jurors compared to Limani's 1. In addition, Lindita won the jury vote by scoring twice as much as Limani (80 points v. 40 points), while Limani won the public vote by scoring twice as much as Lindita (10 points v. 5 points). A 60/40 ratio would have required that the public vote be worth 8 times the vote of 1 member from the 12-member jury.
- Also in 2016, Ledina Çelo's see-through dress on the first semi final made clamour throughout the Albanian media as criticism ensued due to the family-oriented nature of the festival's audience. Her hosting abilities were also heavily criticised. Journalist Dasara Karaiskaj, known for her pointed humor, lamented the situation by commenting that Çelo must have read the script "through her ass".
- In 2017, singer Kastro Zizo claimed that his song was politically censored by RTSH due to its lyrics. RTSH stated that the decision was made by the preselection jury, which could qualify only 22 out of the 70 entries that were submitted, leaving no space for politics to play a role. After posting the full lyrics, Kastro maintained that the lyrics were penalized for portraying the increase in migration that had come as a result of the policies of the current government, blaming RTSH bureaucrats for the occurrence. Former prime minister Sali Berisha also expressed his views, comparing the jury's decision to Hoxha's censorship over the festival during the 1970s. A few days later, singer Klajdi Musabelliu made a similar complaint, stating that he was shocked to learn that his migration-themed entry did not pass the preselection. Since Musabelliu also works for an opposition party, his disqualification from the FiK semi finals quickly became politicised as well.

== Presenters and venues ==
Year	Edition	Hosts	Venue	Director
1962	Festivali i Këngës 1	Margarita Xhepa and Luigj Gurakuqi Jr.	Higher Institute of Arts	Luigj Gurakuqi Jr.
1963	Festivali i Këngës 2	Vera Zheji and Skifter Këlliçi	Higher Institute of Arts	Luigj Gurakuqi Jr.
1964	Festivali i Këngës 3	Drita Bardhi and Vangjel Heba	Higher Institute of Arts	Luigj Gurakuqi Jr.
1965	Festivali i Këngës 4	Drita Bardhi and Bujar Kapexhiu	Higher Institute of Arts	Luigj Gurakuqi Jr.
1966	Festivali i Këngës 5	Drita Bardhi and Bujar Kapexhiu	Higher Institute of Arts	—N/a
1967	Festivali i Këngës 6	Albert Minga and Drita Bardhi	Higher Institute of Arts	—N/a
1968	Festivali i Këngës 7	Drita Bardhi and Roland Trebicka	Higher Institute of Arts	—N/a
1969	Festivali i Këngës 8	Elisabeta Vasili and Kiço Fotiadhi	National Theatre of Opera and Ballet of Albania	Albert Minga
1970	Festivali i Këngës 9	Adriana Fishta and Mevlan Shanaj	National Theatre of Opera and Ballet of Albania	Albert Minga
1971	Festivali i Këngës 10	Edi Luarasi and Viktor Zhusti	National Theatre of Opera and Ballet of Albania	Mihallaq Luarasi
1972	Festivali i Këngës 11	Edi Luarasi and Bujar Kapexhiu	National Theatre of Opera and Ballet of Albania	Mihallaq Luarasi
1973	Festivali i Këngës 12	Flutura Çangu and Pandi Siku	National Theatre of Opera and Ballet of Albania	Albert Minga
1974	Festivali i Këngës 13	Arta Dade and Esat Teliti	National Theatre of Opera and Ballet of Albania	Albert Minga
1975	Festivali i Këngës 14	Rezarta Malaj and Kastriot Caushi	National Theatre of Opera and Ballet of Albania	Mevlan Shanaj
1976	Festivali i Këngës 15	Rezana Celiku and Ilir Bibolli	National Theatre of Opera and Ballet of Albania	Albert Minga and Osman Mula
1977	Festivali i Këngës 16	Zerina Kuke and Ilir Bibolli	National Theatre of Opera and Ballet of Albania	Osman Mula
1978	Festivali i Këngës 17	Zerina Kuke and Ndriçim Xhepa	National Theatre of Opera and Ballet of Albania	Osman Mula
1979	Festivali i Këngës 18	Mimoza Tafaj and Pirro Kita	National Theatre of Opera and Ballet of Albania	Osman Mula
1980	Festivali i Këngës 19	Silvana Braçe and Dhimitër Gjoka	National Theatre of Opera and Ballet of Albania	Osman Mula
1981	Festivali i Këngës 20	Ndriçim Xhepa and Anisa Markarian	National Theatre of Opera and Ballet of Albania	Osman Mula
1982	Festivali i Këngës 21	Dhimiter Gjoka and Dhurata Kasmi	National Theatre of Opera and Ballet of Albania	Osman Mula
1983	Festivali i Këngës 22	Ndriçim Xhepa and Matilda Makoçi	National Theatre of Opera and Ballet of Albania	Osman Mula
1984	Festivali i Këngës 23	Elvira Diamanti and Artan Imami	National Theatre of Opera and Ballet of Albania	Albert Minga
1985	Festivali i Këngës 24	Yllka Mujo	National Theatre of Opera and Ballet of Albania	Vera Grabocka
1986	Festivali i Këngës 25	Ema Ndoja	National Theatre of Opera and Ballet of Albania	Vera Grabocka
1987	Festivali i Këngës 26	Silvana Braçe	National Theatre of Opera and Ballet of Albania	Vera Grabocka
1988	Festivali i Këngës 27	Ina Gjika	National Theatre of Opera and Ballet of Albania	Vera Grabocka
1989	Festivali i Këngës 28	Luiza Xhuvani	Palace of Congresses	Vera Grabocka
1990	Festivali i Këngës 29	Leon Menkshi and Kristi Rrapo	Palace of Congresses	Osman Mula
1991	Festivali i Këngës 30	Leon Menkshi, Ema Andrea and Rudina Magjistari	Palace of Congresses	Vera Grabocka
1992	Festivali i Këngës 31	Dritan Boriçi, Fjoralba Shehu, Sokol Balza and Rudina Magjistari	Palace of Congresses	Leonard Gjata
1993	Festivali i Këngës 32	Silvana Braçe, Ndriçim Xhepa and Juela Meçani	Palace of Congresses	Leonard Gjata and Mishel Koçiu
1994	Festivali i Këngës 33	Reiz Çiço and Doris Petrela	Palace of Congresses	Vera Grabocka and Mishel Koçiu
1995	Festivali i Këngës 34	Reiz Çiço and Doris Petrela	Palace of Congresses	Osman Mula
1996	Festivali i Këngës 35	Ardit Gjebrea, Valbona Çoba and Rudina Magjistari	Palace of Congresses	Osman Mula
1997	Festivali i Këngës 36	Adi Krasta, Vilma Papajani, Hygerta Sako and Monika Zguro	Palace of Congresses	Leonard Gjata
1998	Festivali i Këngës 37	Gazmend Gjoka, Inis Gjoni, Hygerta Sako and Luigj Gurakuqi Jr.	Palace of Congresses	Petrit Bozo
1999	Festivali i Këngës 38	Adi Krasta, Inis Gjoni, Hygerta Sako and Klodiana Maliqi	Palace of Congresses	Petrit Bozo
2000	Festivali i Këngës 39	Erion Mustafaraj and Ornela Bregu	Palace of Congresses	Leonard Gjata
2001	Festivali i Këngës 40	Alban Dudushi and Ornela Bregu	Palace of Congresses	Leonard Gjata
2002	Festivali i Këngës 41	Adi Krasta and Ann Francis Vata	Palace of Congresses	Pali Kuke
2003	Festivali i Këngës 42	Adi Krasta and Ledina Çelo	Palace of Congresses	Pali Kuke
2004	Festivali i Këngës 43	Leon Menkshi and Hueyda El Saied	Palace of Congresses	Pali Kuke
2005	Festivali i Këngës 44	Soni Malaj and Drini Zeqo	Palace of Congresses	Leonard Gjata
2006	Festivali i Këngës 45	Adi Krasta, Vesa Luma and Ermela Teli	Palace of Congresses	Pali Kuke
2007	Festivali i Këngës 46	Elsa Lila and Pirro Çako	Palace of Congresses	Pali Kuke
2008	Festivali i Këngës 47	Elsa Lila, Julian Deda and Gentian Zenelaj	Palace of Congresses	Pali Kuke
2009	Festivali i Këngës 48	Alban Skënderaj and Miriam Cani	Palace of Congresses	Osman Mula
2010	Festivali i Këngës 49	Jonida Maliqi, Josif Gjipali and Mirela Naska	Palace of Congresses	Bojken Lako
2011	Festivali i Këngës 50	Hygerta Sako, Enkeleida Zeko and Nik Xhelilaj	Palace of Congresses	Martin Leka
2012	Festivali i Këngës 51	Enkel Demi and Floriana Garo	Palace of Congresses	Petrit Beçi
2013	Festivali i Këngës 52	Enkel Demi, Xhesika Berberi, Marinela Meta and Klea Huta	Palace of Congresses	Petrit Bozo
2014	Festivali i Këngës 53	Turjan Hyska, Floriana Garo and Liberta Spahiu	Palace of Congresses	Bledi Laço
2015	Festivali i Këngës 54	Pandi Laço and Blerta Tafani	Palace of Congresses	Bledi Laço
2016	Festivali i Këngës 55	Ledina Çelo and Kasem Hoxha	Palace of Congresses	Rezart Aga
2017	Festivali i Këngës 56	Adi Krasta	Palace of Congresses	Pali Kuke
2018	Festivali i Këngës 57	Viktor Zhusti and Ana Golja	Palace of Congresses	Inva Mula
2019	Festivali i Këngës 58	Alketa Vejsiu	Palace of Congresses	Vera Grabocka
2020	Festivali i Këngës 59	Blendi Salaj and Jonida Vokshi	Sheshi Italia (Open-Air)	Pali Kuke
2021	Festivali i Këngës 60	Ardit Gjebrea, Isli Islami, Jonida Maliqi, Kelvi Kadilli and Xhemi Shehu	Palace of Congresses	Redi Treni
2022	Festivali i Këngës 61	Arbana Osmani	Palace of Congresses	Eduart Grishaj
2023	Festivali i Këngës 62	Adriana Matoshi, Kledi Kadiu, Xhuliano Dule and Krisa Çaushi	Palace of Congresses	Elton Deda and Gridi Kraja
2024	Festivali i Këngës 63	Enkel Demi and Ornela Bregu	Palace of Congresses	Redi Treni, Elhaida Dani
2025	Festivali i Këngës 64	Arilena Ara and Salsano Rrapi	Palace of Congresses	Elhaida Dani

== Winners ==
Year	Edition	Artists winning version (w)	Song	Composers music (m) / lyrics (l)
1962	Festivali i Këngës 1	Vaçe Zela (w), Qemal Kërtusha	"Fëmija i parë"	Abdulla Grimci (m) / Dionis Bubani (l)
1963	Festivali i Këngës 2	Nikoleta Shoshi (w), Rita Vako	"Flakë e borë"	Tish Daija (m) / Llazar Siliqi (l)
1964	Festivali i Këngës 3	Vaçe Zela (w), Nikolin Gjergji	"Sot jam 20 vjeç" (Note: In 1964, the song "Margjelo" by Klotilda Shantoja and Nikolin Gjergji won the competition, however, this entry was disqualified after it was discovered that it had been heard by the public prior to the official dates of the festival. The default winner then became the second ranked entry "Dritaren kërkoj" by Vaçe Zela although RTSH also awarded a symbolic first prize to Vaçe Zela's "Sot jam 20 vjeç" at a later time. In 1970, two songs were awarded the first place; "Mesnatë" by Vaçe Zela and "Shtëpia ku lindi partia" by Gaqo Çako.)	Llazar Morcka (m) / Dionis Bubani (l)
1964	Festivali i Këngës 3	Vaçe Zela (w), Klotilda Shantoja	"Dritaren kërkoj"	Tonin Harapi (m) / Llazar Siliqi (l)
1965	Festivali i Këngës 4	Tonin Tërshana (w), Rita Vako	"Të dua o det"	Tonin Harapi (m) / Mark Gurakuqi (l)
1966	Festivali i Këngës 5	Vaçe Zela (w), Ramiz Kovaçi	"Shqiponja e lirë"	Pjetër Gaci (m) / Ismail Kadare (l)
1967	Festivali i Këngës 6	Vaçe Zela (w), Gaqo Çako	"Këngë për shkurte vatën"	Ferdinand Deda (m) / Ruzhdi Pulaha (l)
1968	Festivali i Këngës 7	Vaçe Zela (w), Ramiz Kovaçi	"Mësuesit hero"	Limoz Dizdari (m) / Dritero Agolli (l)
1969	Festivali i Këngës 8	David Tukiçi (w), Rozeta Doraci	"Dhuratë për ditëlindje"	Nikolla Zoraqi (m) / Fatos Arapi (l)
1970	Festivali i Këngës 9	Vaçe Zela (w), Liljana Kondakçi	"Mesnatë"	Shpëtim Kushta (m) / Fatos Arapi (l)
1970	Festivali i Këngës 9	Gaqo Çako (w), Ema Qazimi	"Shtëpia ku lindi partia"	Nikolla Zoraqi (m) / Agim Shehu (l)
1971	Festivali i Këngës 10	Sherif Merdani (w), Tonin Tërshana	"Kënga e nënës"	Agim Prodani (m) / Agim Shehu (l)
1972	Festivali i Këngës 11	Tonin Tërshana	"Erdhi pranvera"	Pjetër Gaci (m) / Fatos Arapi (l)
1973	Festivali i Këngës 12	Vaçe Zela (w), Ema Qazimi	"Gjurmët e arta"	Kujtim Laro (m) / Lirim Deda (l)
1974	Festivali i Këngës 13	Alida Hisku (w), Petrit Dobjani, Valentina Gjoni	"Vajzat e fshatit tim"	Enver Shëngjergji (m) / Zhuliana Jorganxhi (l)
1975	Festivali i Këngës 14	Alida Hisku (w), Ema Qazimi	"Buka e duarve tona"	Kujtim Laro (m) / Xhevahir Spahiu (l)
1976	Festivali i Këngës 15	Vaçe Zela (w), Avni Mula	"Nënë moj do pres gërshetin"	Avni Mula (m) / Hysni Milloshi (l)
1977	Festivali i Këngës 16	Vaçe Zela (w), Shpresa Spaho	"Gonxhe në pemën e lirisë"	Limoz Dizdari (m) / Robert Shvarc and Zhuliana Jorganxhi (l)
1978	Festivali i Këngës 17	Gaqo Çako (w), Ema Qazimi and Liljana Kondakçi	"Këputa një gjethe dafine"	Limoz Dizdari (m) / Xhevahir Spahiu (l)
1979	Festivali i Këngës 18	Zeliha Sina and Liljana Kondakçi (w), Afërdita (Laçi) Zonja	"Festë ka sot Shqipëria"	Agim Prodani (m) / Zhuliana Jorganxhi (l)
1980	Festivali i Këngës 19	Vaçe Zela (w), Myfarete Laze	"Shoqet tona ilegale"	Agim Prodani (m) / Zhuliana Jorganxhi (l)
1981	Festivali i Këngës 20	Ema Qazimi (w), Liljana Kondakçi	"Krenari e brezave"	Feim Ibrahimi (m) / Gjoke Beci (l)
1982	Festivali i Këngës 21	Marina Grabovari (w), Luan Zhegu	"Një djep në barrikadë"	Avni Mula (m) / Hysni Milloshi (l)
1983	Festivali i Këngës 22	Tonin Tërshana (w), Liljana Kondakçi	"Vajzë moj, lule moj"	Luan Zhegu (m) / Adelina Balashi (l)
1984	Festivali i Këngës 23	Gëzim Çela and Nertila Koka (w), Bashkim Alibali	"Çel si gonxhe dashuria"	Vladimir Kotani (m) / Arben Duka (l)
1985	Festivali i Këngës 24	Parashqevi Simaku	"Në moshën e rinisë"	Vladimir Kotani (m) / Arben Duka (l)
1986	Festivali i Këngës 25	Nertila Koka	"Dy gëzime në një ditë"	David Tukiçi (m) / Gjoke Beci (l)
1987	Festivali i Këngës 26	Irma Libohova and Eranda Libohova	"Nuk e harroj"	Agim Krajka (m) / Arben Duka (l)
1988	Festivali i Këngës 27	Parashqevi Simaku	"E duam lumturinë"	Pirro Çako (m) / Agim Doçi (l)
1989	Festivali i Këngës 28	Frederik Ndoci, Manjola Nallbani and Julia Ndoci	"Toka e diellit"	Aleksander Peçi (m) / Xhevahir Spahiu (l)
1990	Festivali i Këngës 29	Anita Bitri	"Askush s'do ta besojë"	Flamur Shehu (m) / Jorgo Papingji (l)
1991	Festivali i Këngës 30	Ardit Gjebrea	"Jon"	Ardit Gjebrea (m) / Xhankarlo Milone and Zhuliana Jorganxhi (l)
1992	Festivali i Këngës 31	Aleksandër Gjoka, Manjola Nallbani and Viktor Tahiraj	"Pesha e fatit"	Osman Mula (m) / Alqi Boshnjaku (l)
1993	Festivali i Këngës 32	Manjola Nallbani	"Kur e humba një dashuri"	Vladimir Kotani (m) / Jorgo Papingji (l)
1994	Festivali i Këngës 33	Mira Konçi	"Të sotmen jeto"	Shpëtim Saraçi (m) / Alqi Boshnjaku (l)
1995	Festivali i Këngës 34	Ardit Gjebrea	"Eja"	Ardit Gjebrea (m) / Xhevahir Spahiu (l)
1996	Festivali i Këngës 35	Elsa Lila	"Pyes lotin"	Valentin Veizi (m) / Enrjeta Sina (l)
1997	Festivali i Këngës 36	Elsa Lila	"Larg urrejtjes"	Valentin Veizi (m) / Alqi Boshnjaku (l)
1998	Festivali i Këngës 37	Albërie Hadërgjonaj	"Mirësia dhe e vërteta"	Luan Zhegu (m) / Arben Duka (l)
1999	Festivali i Këngës 38	Aurela Gaçe	"S'jam tribu"	Adrian Hila (m) / Jorgo Papingji (l)
2000	Festivali i Këngës 39	Rovena Dilo	"Ante i tokës sime"	Ardit Gjebrea (m) / Rovena Dilo (l)
2001	Festivali i Këngës 40	Aurela Gaçe	"Jetoj"	Adrian Hila (m) / Jorgo Papingji (l)
2002	Festivali i Këngës 41	Mira Konçi	"Brënda vetes më merr"	Shpëtim Saraçi (m) / Pandi Laço (l)
Winner decided as Albanian entry in the Eurovision Song Contest (2003–2021)
2003	Festivali i Këngës 42	Anjeza Shahini	"Imazhi yt"	Edmond Zhulali (m) / Agim Doçi (l)
2004	Festivali i Këngës 43	Ledina Çelo	"Nesër shkoj"	Adrian Hila (m) / Pandi Laço (l)
2005	Festivali i Këngës 44	Luiz Ejlli	"Zjarr e ftohtë"	Klodian Qafoku (m) / Dr. Flori (l)
2006	Festivali i Këngës 45	Frederik and Aida Ndoci	"Balada e gurit"	Adrian Hila (m) / Pandi Laço (l)
2007	Festivali i Këngës 46	Olta Boka	"Zemrën e lamë peng"	Adrian Hila (m) / Pandi Laço (l)
2008	Festivali i Këngës 47	Kejsi Tola	"Më merr në ëndërr"	Edmond Zhulali (m) / Agim Doçi (l)
2009	Festivali i Këngës 48	Juliana Pasha	"Nuk mundem pa ty"	Ardit Gjebrea (m) / Pirro Çako (l)
2010	Festivali i Këngës 49	Aurela Gaçe	"Kënga ime"	Shpëtim Saraçi (m) / Sokol Marsi (l)
2011	Festivali i Këngës 50	Rona Nishliu	"Suus"	Florent Boshnjaku (m) / Rona Nishliu (l)
2012	Festivali i Këngës 51	Adrian Lulgjuraj and Bledar Sejko	"Identitet"	Bledar Sejko (m) / Eda Sejko (l)
2013	Festivali i Këngës 52	Hersjana Matmuja	"Zemërimi i një nate"	Genti Lako (m) / Jorgo Papingji (l)
2014	Festivali i Këngës 53	Elhaida Dani	"Diell" (Note: Elhaida Dani won Festivali i Këngës 53 with the song "Diell" and was planning on performing an English-language version of the song at the Eurovision Song Contest 2015. However, in February 2015 it was announced that the song's songwriters decided to withdraw the song, and Dani would perform a different song titled "I'm Alive" in the contest.)	Aldo Shllaku (m) / Viola Trebicka and Sokol Marsi (l)
2015	Festivali i Këngës 54	Eneda Tarifa	"Përrallë"	Olsa Toqi (m&l)
2016	Festivali i Këngës 55	Lindita Halimi	"Botë"	Klodian Qafoku (m) / Gerald Xhari (l)
2017	Festivali i Këngës 56	Eugent Bushpepa	"Mall"	Eugent Bushpepa (m&l)
2018	Festivali i Këngës 57	Jonida Maliqi	"Ktheju tokës"	Eriona Rushiti (m&l)
2019	Festivali i Këngës 58	Arilena Ara	"Shaj"	Darko Dimitrov (m) / Lindon Berisha (l)
2020	Festivali i Këngës 59	Anxhela Peristeri	"Karma"	Kledi Bahiti (m) / Olti Curri (l)
2021	Festivali i Këngës 60	Ronela Hajati	"Sekret"	Ronela Hajati (m&l)
Winner decided by jury vote; Eurovision entry now decided by public vote
2022	Festivali i Këngës 61	Elsa Lila	"Evita"	Elsa Lila (m&l)
2023	Festivali i Këngës 62	Mal Retkoceri	"Çmendur"	Mal Retkoceri (m&l)
Winner now decided half by jury vote and half by public vote; Winner decided as Albanian entry in the Eurovision Song Contest
2024	Festivali i Këngës 63	Shkodra Elektronike	"Zjerm"	Shkodra Elektronike (m&l)
2025	Festivali i Këngës 64	Alis	"Nân"	Alis Kallacej (m) / Desara Gjini (l)

=== Recurring winners ===
As of 2022, Vaçe Zela holds the record for the highest number of wins having won the contest eleven times followed by Tonin Tërshana with four wins, Aurela Gaçe, Manjola Nallbani, and Elsa Lila with three wins respectively.

Artist	Victories	Years
Vaçe Zela	11	1962, 1964^{(×2)}, 1966, 1967, 1968; 1970, 1973, 1976, 1977, 1980
Tonin Tërshana	4	1965, 1971, 1972, 1983
Manjola Nallbani	3	1989, 1992, 1993
Elsa Lila	3	1996, 1997, 2022
Aurela Gaçe	3	1999, 2001, 2010
Gaqo Çako	2	1970, 1978
Alida Hisku	2	1974, 1975
Nertila Koka	2	1984, 1986
Parashqevi Simaku	2	1985, 1988
Frederik Ndoci	2	1989, 2006
Ardit Gjebrea	2	1991, 1995
Mira Konçi	2	1994, 2002
