= Ramiz Kovaçi =

- Born: 22 March 1929; Krujë, Albania
- Died: 1994 (aged 64–65) Tirana, Albania
- Genres: classical music, light music
- Occupation: baritone
- Years active: 1961–1994

Ramiz Kovaçi (22 March 1929 – 1994) was an Albanian baritone. One of his generation's most notable opera singers, he was the main baritone of the National Theatre of Opera and Ballet of Albania and a founder of the Academy of Arts of Albania. In his last years, he performed at the İzmir venue of the Turkish State Opera and Ballet. He received the titles of People's Artist of Albania and Honor of Nation Order.

== Life ==
Kovaçi was born on 22 March 1929 in Krujë, Albania. He graduated from the Jordan Misja Artistic Lyceum under Mihal Ciko and later pursued his canto studies at the Bulgarian State Conservatoire in Sofia under Professors Hristo Brambarov and Yossifov. He specialized at the Accademia Nazionale di Santa Cecilia in Rome.

Kovaçi became lead baritone of the National Theatre of Opera and Ballet of Albania in Italian operas by Verdi, Rossini, Leoncavallo, and Puccini, as well as Albanian operas by Zadeja, Pjetër Gaci, Harapi, and Kono. He is one of the founders of the Academy of Arts of Albania. After 1991, Kovaçi worked at the İzmir Turkish State Opera and Ballet venue

Kovaçi was consistently in the jury of the Festivali i Këngës, a light music event, beginning from its second edition in 1963. He had a disagreement with composer Çesk Zadeja on which song should win the 1963 festival (Flake e Borë or the eventual winner Djaloshi dhe Shiu). The dispute was settled with a decision that accounted for the intervention of composer Simon Gjoni, another jury member, who thought that Djaloshi dhe Shiu was more of a hit than Flake e Borë.

== Personal life ==
In 1963, he married Nikoleta Lilova, a Bulgarian native, and brought her to Albania. They had a daughter, who married Edmond Tullumani, father of soprano Ramona Tullumani. Kovaçi died in 1994.

== Recognition ==
Aside from being the recipient of the titles of People's Artist of Albania, and Honor of Nation Order, a prize dedicated to Kovaçi's name is provided to the best baritone of the pan-national festival of lyric voices (Albanian: Festivalin Mbarëkombëtar të Zërave Lirikë "JorgjiaTruja"), which began to be held in Albania in 2015.
