= List of Albanian film composers =

This is a list of Albanian film composers.

== Film composers ==
- Prenkë Jakova (1917-1969)
- Nikolla Zoraqi (1928-1991)
- Feim Ibrahimi (1935-1997)
- Limoz Dizdari (1942)
- Thomas Simaku (1958)
