= Luçie Miloti =

Albanian folk singer

Luçie Miloti (1930–2006) was an Albanian folk singer from Shkodra where she developed her interest in the area's traditional music. While still in her teens, she moved to Tirana where she performed as a soloist with the Albanian National Song and Dance Ensemble (Ansamblit të Këngëve dhe Valleve Popullore) over the next 30 years, releasing recordings from Radio Tirana.

== Biography ==
Born on 11 May 1930 in Shkodra in Northern Albania, Miloti was brought up in a family involved in the traditional music of the city and began singing on the stage when she was just 12. Encouraged by the composer Prenkë Jakova, she began singing at Shkroda's House of Culture and performed on Radio Shkodra. In 1946, she moved to Tirana with her parents where she studied singing under the soprano Jorgjia Filçe-Truja at the Jordan Misja Lyceum.

She became a soloist first at Radio Tirana under Paulin Palit and later with the Albanian Philharmonic Orchestra. In 1957, she joined the Albanian National Song and Dance Ensemble as a soloist where she remained until she was 45, when she retired. Many songs were specially composed for her. During her career, she performed some 500 songs, many of which gained international attention.

Miloti died in Tirana on 15 May 2006, a few days after her 76th birthday.
