= Eftali Ndreu =

Cellist

Eftali Ndreu (born January 10, 1955, Tirana) is a cellist from Albania now based in Buenos Aires, Argentina.

== Biography ==
She studied at the Jordan Misja and participated in all the activities organized by the school. During the years 1973–1978, she continued her studies at the Academy of Arts. After her studies, she was a cellist teacher at the Jordan Misja where she worked until 1990. During this period, she actively participated in concerts given in important halls such as the Union of Writers and Artists, National Theatre of Opera and Ballet of Albania, the Palace of Culture of Tirana and recordings on Albanian Radio and Television.

In 1990, she and her family emigrated to Buenos Aires, Argentina. She continues to be active in the cellist community there and has naturalized as a citizen of Argentina.
