= Liljana Kondakçi =

Albanian singer (born 1950)

- Born: October 12, 1950 (age 75); Tirana, Albania
- Occupations: Singer; actress
- Years active: 1965–2006
- Known for: Winner of Festivali i Këngës
- Criminal charges: Drug trafficking
- Criminal penalty: 2 years and 8 months imprisonment
- Criminal status: Released
- Children: 2
- Awards: Merited Artist

Liljana Kondakçi (born 12 October 1950) is an Albanian singer and actress. Her career in the music scene and her delicate, melodious voice have made her one of the most recognized names in the Song Festival of Albania.

== Life and career ==
Kondakçi was born in Tirana on 12 October 1950. She was only 14 years old when the young girl with long black hair, a strikingly sensual appearance, dressed simply in a printed cotton dress, stepped onto the stage of the most important festival of the time, the end-of-year music festival organized by Radio Television. It was 1967, the fifth edition of the festival, and she captured attention with a live performance of a song composed by Ferdinand Deda. "The Village with Lights Will Blossom", despite its schematic and era-typical lyrics, quickly became a tune widely whistled by the youth, while the young singer marked the beginning of an uninterrupted participation in all the subsequent festivals.

For 22 consecutive years, Kondakçi would remain one of the most renowned singers of Albanian light music, also gaining recognition for her original interpretation of traditional folk songs. Throughout this period, Kondakçi was employed as a singer at the Tirana variety show Estrada, and for a shorter time, she worked at Albanian Radio Television as a music editor. Kondakçiu was the winner of the 18th Festivali i Këngës. She is a Merited Artist of Albania, she also appeared in two films in the Albania cinema.

== Arrest and legal issues ==
In 2006, Kondakçi was reportedly stopped at the Sibari railway station in Italy while transporting three kilograms of heroin. Italian media indicated that she was known by the nickname "Mama" within a 20-member drug trafficking gang. In 2010, she was arrested in Thessaloniki, Greece, following an international arrest warrant issued by Italian authorities. Subsequently, she was extradited to Italy, where she was accused of evading police checks by leveraging her fame as a singer.

Kondakçi was sentenced to 2 years and 8 months in prison in Italy for her involvement in drug trafficking. She completed her sentence and was released in early 2013, after which she returned to Albania.

== Personal life ==
Upon her return to Albania, Kondakçi resumed a low-profile life in Tirana. Her family reportedly shielded her elderly mother from the details of her legal troubles, informing her that Kondakçi was in Greece. Following her release from prison in early 2013, Liljana Kondakçi made a notable public appearance on 25 January 2013, when she was interviewed on the Albanian television program Zonë e Lirë. During this interview, she discussed her experiences during incarceration and her plans for the future.

In the years that followed, Kondakçi maintained a low public profile. While she did not return to active performance, she occasionally participated in interviews and television appearances. For instance, in a 2024 interview, she reflected on her musical career and commented on the situation of fellow singer Parashqevi Simaku. Kondakçi has two children, a daughter who is a soprano and pianist and a boy who is a painter. Her husband died in 2017.
