= Simaku =

Simaku is a surname. Notable people with the surname include:

- Parashqevi Simaku (born 1966), Albanian singer
- Thomas Simaku (born 1958), Albanian composer
