= Drilon Hoxha =

Albanian film director, actor and screenwriter

- Born: 16 June 1991 (age 34); Berat, Albania
- Education: Jordan Misja Artistic Lyceum
- Occupations: Actor; Director; Producer; Screenwriter
- Years active: 2008–present
- Known for: Drejt Fundit, Shkëmbimi, Ego

Drilon Hoxha (born 16 June 1991) is an Albanian actor, director, producer and screenwriter. He began his career as an impersonator and comedian in television shows, later focusing on filmmaking, where he has produced several action and drama films.

== Early life and education ==
Hoxha was born in Berat on 16 June 1991. After several years, he moved with his family to Tirana.

He completed his secondary education at the Jordan Misja Artistic Lyceum, where he studied painting. He later pursued higher education in directing and acting.

== Career ==
=== Early television career ===
His public career began in 2008, at the age of 17, when he participated in the talent show Ti Vlen. He competed as an impersonator and reached the semi-finals, gaining recognition for his comedic performances.

Two years later, he took part in Albania's Got Talent , where, in addition to acting, he demonstrated beatboxing skills and reached the final stage. In the same year, Hoxha was selected as part of the cast of the comedy show Portokalli, where he became known primarily for his impersonation of political figure Sali Berisha. He remained part of the show for one full season.

=== Film career ===
Following his television experience, Hoxha focused on film production and founded his production company, D.H Production, in 2015.

His first comedy film, Çimi, premiered on 9 August 2013. On 22 October 2015, he released the film Drejt fundit, which introduced a new approach to the action genre in Albania,Hoxha served both as director and lead actor. In the following years, he produced several other film projects, including Dashuria s'mjafton (2018), Shkëmbimi (2022), and Ego (2023).

== Filmography ==
Year	Title	Role	Notes
2013	Çimi	Çimi	Actor/Writer
2014	Albanian Action	Çimi	Producer
2015	Drejt fundit	Çimi	Director/Actor
2018	Dashuria s'mjafton	Alban	Director/Actor
2022	Shkëmbimi	Loni	Director/Actor
2023	Ego	Qorri	Director/Actor
2025	Golden Brothers	Ladi	Director/Actor
