= Tonin Tërshana =

Albanian singer (1949–2015)

Tonin Tërshana MM
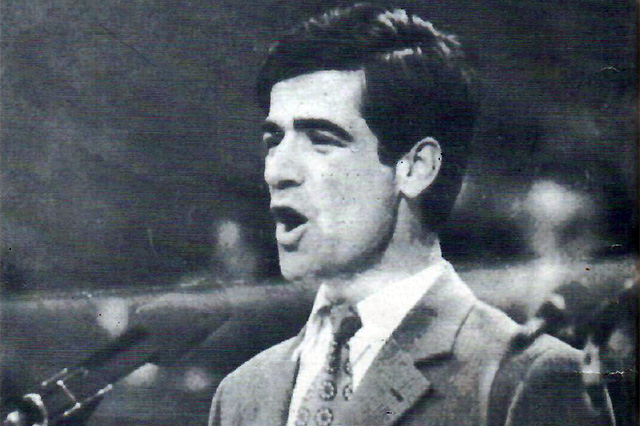
- Born: June 1, 1949; Shkodër, Albania
- Died: 22 September 2015 (aged 66); Tirana, Albania
- Occupations: Singer; actor
- Musical career
- Genres: Folk
- Instruments: Vocals

Tonin Tërshana (Albanian pronunciation: [tɔˈnin təɾˈʃana]; 1 June 1949 – 22 September 2015) was an Albanian singer from Shkodër. He was a frequent participant of Festivali i Këngës, having won 4 times, the second most in the competition after Vaçe Zela.

== Life and career ==
Tërshana was born on 1 June 1949 in Shkodër, under the then communist regime. His foray into music would start from a young age singing in competitions in Shkodër and Tirana.

His first entry in Festivali i Këngës was in its fourth edition in 1965, where he would win first prize performing "Të dua o det", a song composed by Tonin Harapi with lyrics from Mark Gurakuqi. After this win, he was barred from participating in the event in the future, his return being allowed only after an intervention from Petrit Dume.

He returned in 1969 and would go on to participate in 18 different editions of the festival, performing 23 different songs and winning on 4 occasions (1965, 1971, 1972 and 1983).

Tërshana died on 22 September 2015 at the "Mother Teresa" Medical Center in Tirana after a long battle with cancer.

== Discography ==
=== Selected songs ===
- Të dua o det
- Kënga e nënës
- Kur vjen pranvera
- Vajzë moj, lule moj
- Fishekzjarre në qiellin blu
- Lumturia nuk dhurohet
