= Jordan Misja Artistic Lyceum =

Art school in Tirana, Albania

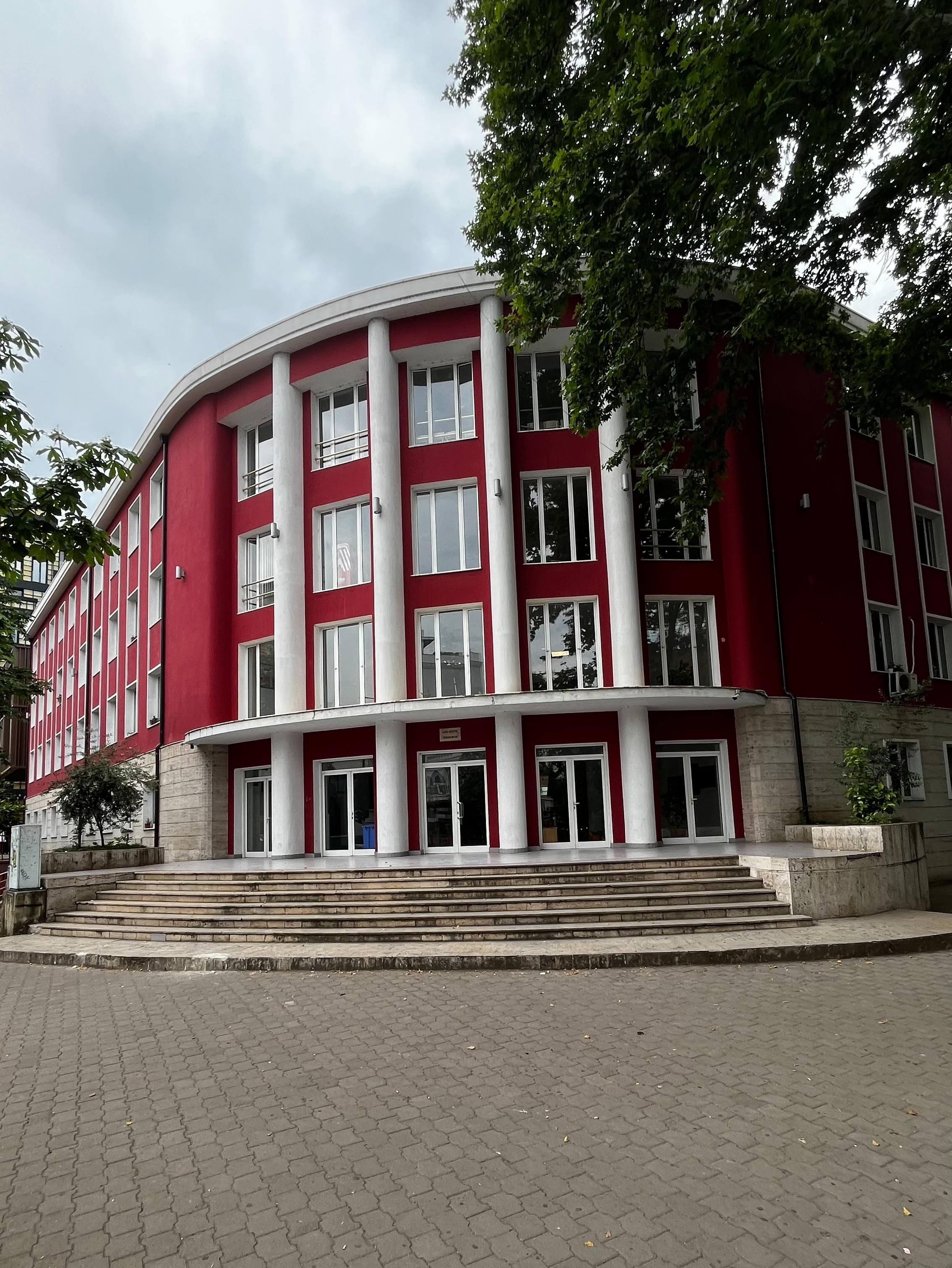

Location
- Elbasan Street, Tirana; Albania
- 41°19′18″N 19°49′31″E

Information
- Type: Elementary, Middle, and High School
- Opened: 1946
- School district: District of Tirana
- Grades: 1–12

The Jordan Misja Artistic Lyceum (Albanian: Liceu Artistik Jordan Misja) is an artistic school in Tirana, Albania, for youth from 6 to 18 years old. Established in 1946, it included music, ballet, dramatic arts, painting and sculpting classes. Today it offers integrated studies of general classes and arts, music, and sculpture classes. Most Albanian professional artists are alumni of the school.

== History ==
The Artistic Lyceum was established in 1946 and was given the name of World War II People's Hero Jordan Misja, who had been a painter. For several decades it was the only artistic high school in Albania. It used to have five departments: Theoretical, Canto, Dramatic Arts, Choreography, and Figurative Arts (with several specialties).

In 1973, following a speech from March by Enver Hoxha, then Albania's communist dictator, Agron Dushku, a delegate of the Central Committee of the Party of Labor of Albania, reported to the Central Committee that the Lyceum had a low level of communist behavior and that there was indifference to the Party's big-character posters placed at the school. He also reported that Albanian folk music was not taught at the school, that there was heavy absenteeism, and that most of the communists at the school were in administrative rather than teaching positions.

In 1990-1991 many protests, which ended up with the fall of communism in Albania, occurred in front of the building of the Lyceum. On December 9, 1990, one of the first anticommunist protests in Tirana, several thousand students began marching at Student City and ended right in front of the Lyceum. There, the police suppressed the protest with batons. On February 15, 1991, the students made it further past the Artistic Lyceum building, and were headed to the Blloku quarters where the nomenclature lived, but they were water hosed by police and had to disperse at the Enver Hoxha Museum and along the main boulevard, thereby not being able to reach their goal of the Blloku quarters.

As of 2014 the building housing the school was in a dire state and the school museum with its history of famous alumni no longer existed. In 2016 the building underwent a full reconstruction, whose inauguration was attended by Albanian Prime Minister Edi Rama. In 2017 a public tender on a new concert hall, named after composer Tonin Harapi, was announced. The new hall will be adjacent to the existing school building.

On December 7, 2017, students and professors of the school performed in a classical music concert at the Resurrection Cathedral in Tirana.

== Teachers and alumni ==
The school gives recognition to several renowned artists who were teachers at the school, including sculptors Odhise Paskali, Janaq Paço, Kristina Hoshi, (first Albanian woman sculptor), and Andrea Mano; painters Foto Stamo, Abdurrahim Buza, Kel Kodheli, Sadik Kaceli, Nexhmedin Zajmi, and Guri Madhi; dramatic arts teachers Mihal Popi, Zina Andri (Pano), Naim Frashëri, and Kadri Roshi; composers Çesk Zadeja, Tish Daija, Pjetër Gaci, Avni Mula, Kozma Laro, Feim Ibrahimi, and Simon Gjoni; orchestra directors Mustafa Krantja and Rifat Teqja; violinist Ludovik Naraçi; vocalists Marie Kraja, Nina Mula, Gjoni Thanasi, Jorgjie Truja, and Shpresa Nishani; musicologist Ramadan Sokoli; and choreographers Perkunji (Russian), Panajot Kanaçi, Xhemil Simitçiu, Ganimete Vendresha, Zoica Haxho, Agron Aliaj, and Petrit Vorpsi. The first director of the school was composer Konstandin Trako.

Most Albanian professional artists are alumni of the Jordan Misja Lyceum. Alumni have worked for the Albanian National Song and Dance Ensemble, the National Theatre of Opera and Ballet of Albania, and the University of Arts, and have created works in all major genres. Many have successfully performed abroad as well.

The most well known alumni include painters and sculptors Vilson Kilica, Kristaq Rama, Shaban Hadëri, Hektor Dule, Thoma Thomai, Mumtaz Dhrami, Ksenofon Dilo, Sali Shijaku, Fuat Dushku, Danish Jukniu, Thanas Papa, and Naxhi Bakalli; theatre and movie actors Kristaq Dhamo, Tinka Kurti, Ismail Hoxha, Hysen Hakani, Tomi Mato, Kujtim Spahivogli, and Mihallaq Luarasi; composer Nikolla Zoraqi; orchestra directors Milto Vako, Suzana Turku, and Ermir Krantja; tenors Gaqo Çako and Kristaq Paspali; pianist Margarita Kristidhi; violinists Rajmonda Koço, Bujar Sykja, Gjovalin Lazri, Nasho Paspali, and Rudina Banja; musicologists Hamide Stringa and Zana Shuteriqi; and ballerinas Ajshe Vaso, Nermin Strazimiri, and Keti Trajani. Other notable alumni are singer Vaçe Zela (11-time winner of the light music festival of Festivali i Këngës), showman Ardit Gjebrea, violinist Tedi Papavrami, and soprano Inva Mula. Current artists that have attended the school include opera singers Saimir Pirgu, and Ermonela Jaho. Politicians who have graduated from the school include Prime Minister of Albania Edi Rama and Taulant Dedja.
