= Parashqevi =

Parashqevi is a given name. Notable people with the name include:

- Parashqevi Qiriazi (1880–1970), Albanian teacher
- Parashqevi Simaku (born 1966), Albanian singer
