= Kristo Kono =

Albanian composer (1907–1991)

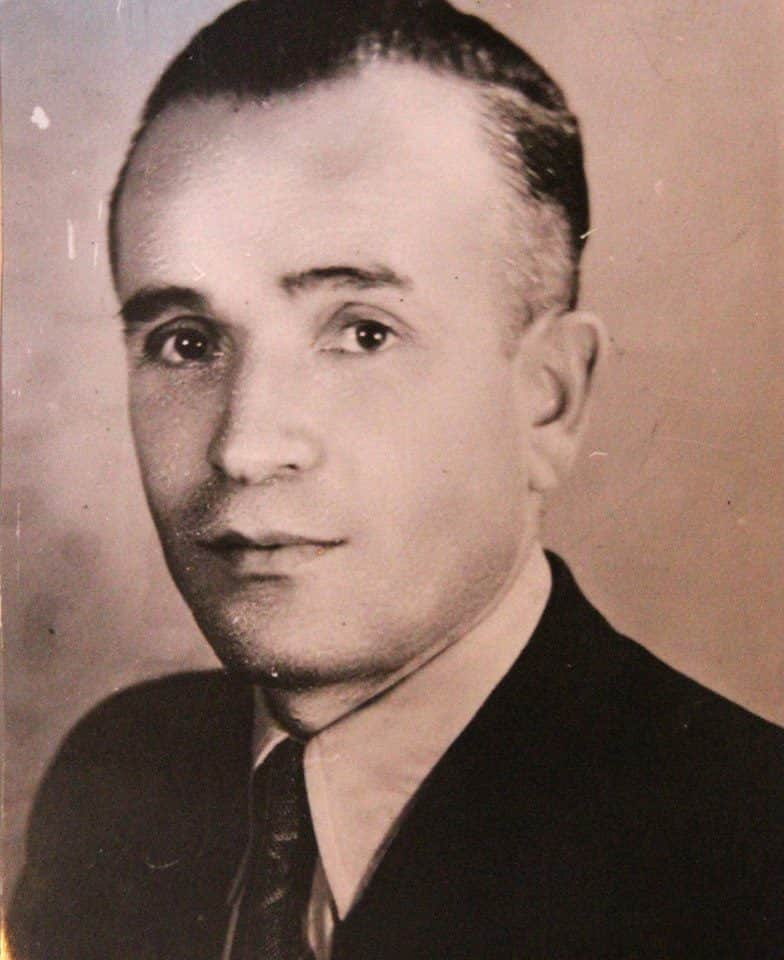
- Born: July 17, 1907; Korçë, Manastir Vilayet, Ottoman Empire (modern Albania)
- Died: January 22, 1991 (aged 83)
- Era: 20th century
- Known for: Lulet e kujtimit (Flower of remembrance) operetta, choral rhapsodies and poems
- Awards: People's Artist

Kristo Kono (17 July 1907 – 22 January 1991) was an Albanian composer and recipient of the People's Artist title in 1961, the highest artistic recognition title during the communist era. He was one of the early contributors to Albanian music and opera who spent all his life in their service; one of the symbols of the cultural traditions of his hometown of Korçë, same as other musicians as Tefta Tashko-Koço, Jorgjia Truja, and Kristaq Antoniu; and one of the main personalities of the early generation of Albanian composers together with Nikolla Zoraqi, Tish Daija, Tonin Harapi, and Feim Ibrahimi.

== Early life and work ==
Kono was born on 22 January 1907 in Korçë, back then still part of the Ottoman Empire, today's southeastern Albania. His interest in music showed up at a very early age. He followed the "Vatra" orchestral band in order to learn how to play the clarinet. In the 1920s he would start to compose songs and small instrumental parts.

In 1927, he went to Paris to study music at the Conservatoire de Paris but stayed there only 15 months. He moved to Milan and enrolled in the Giuseppe Verdi conservatoire. Finishing his studies in 1932, he returned home. In September of the same year, Kono participated in a concert of the cultural society "Skanderbeg" of Korçë, where he showed his skills for the first time before the Albanian public. The first post-study years he worked as a music teacher in the city of Gjirokastër and in the National Lyceum of his hometown, one of the most accredited schools of that time within Albania. At both schools he set up choirs and orchestras and performed for the public. At the same time, he began working with renowned artistic choir "Lira" (The lyre). After creating romances like Asnjë shpresë ("No hope"), Vjollcat (The violets), and Ktheju ("Come back") based on Hilë Mosi's lyrics, he composed some well known urban lyrical songs which were sung by singers such as Truja and Tashko-Koço. The most known were Kur më vjen burrin nga stani ("When my husband comes back from dairy"), and Kur m'u rrite vogëloshe ("You have grown up little girl") based on lyrics from Poradeci, and Fol e qesh moj sylarushe (Talk and laugh o you bright eyed girl") based on the lyrics of Milto Sotir Gurra. A less known side of his work was as a folklorist; he engaged in collecting and processing for the chorus many folkloric songs, giving them new quality and value. This work was converged in the publication of two choral rhapsodies. The "Albanian Rhapsody No. 1" was based on southern-Albania folk motives and performed with great success in Tirana on 28 November 1942, the Albanian Flag Day.

== Rise as a composer ==
After World War II, Kono's artistic creativity intensified. He went deeper in the study of folk songs and patriotic songs. His big jump in fame came with the composition of major choral and instrumental works: instrumental poems and cantata. They were the first of their kind in Albania. The best known were the instrumental poems Borova (Borova) and Labëria (Labëria), and the cantata Malli për atdhe ("Longing for the homeland"). His most known concert-instrumental works consist of Fantazi shqiptare ("Albanian fantasy"), Valle shqiptare ("Albanian dance"), the fantasia Mezhgorani (Mezhgoran), and the poem for orchestra Bredhat e Drenovës ("Drenova fir"). Kono wrote many instrumental pieces of different formations, from suites for orchestra, ensemble pieces for flute, oboe, violin, piano, clarinet, etc. His operetta Agimi (The dawn) of 1954 paved the way for the development of opera in Albania. After that, he composed two other operettas, Së bashku jeta është e bukur ("Together life is beautiful") in 1957, and Brigadierja ("The brigadier") in 1968. The opera Lulja e kujtimit ("Flower of remembrance") based on Foqion Postoli's work with the same title, which was performed the first time in November 1961, is considered his masterpiece. It was performed several times by the National Theatre of Opera and Ballet.

Kono died in 1991 in Korçë.
