= Luan Zhegu =

Albanian singer & composer (born 1949)

Luan Zhegu AM
- Born: 21 September 1949 (age 76); Tirana, Albania
- Occupations: Singer; composer
- Musical career
- Genres: Folk; pop
- Instruments: Vocals, drums, piano

Luan Zhegu (Albanian: [luˈan ˈʒɛgu]; born 21 September 1949) is an Albanian singer and songwriter.

== Life and career ==
Luan Zhegu was born on 21 September 1949 in Tirana. His first steps into music at age 12, playing the nightingale in the Viktor Gjoka operetta Bilbili dhe kanarina ("The Nightingale and the Canary"), with music from Llazar Morcka. After playing a few other operettas during the time he left singing and focused on percussion, later playing the drums at age 17 for the Tirana Circus for two years. In 1969, after refusing to train as an officer he was sent in the marines, staying at the military base in Pasha Liman, near Orikum. There he created his first composition with an accordion, titled Vajza dhe deti ("The Girl and the Sea").

His first foray into Festivali i Këngës came in the 1975 edition, winning the second prize with the song Shokët ("The Friends"), with music by Shaqir Kodra and lyrics from Betim Muço. He participated in multiple editions of the competition both as a singer and as a composer, winning two first prizes as the latter in 1983 and 1998. The winning songs Vajzë moj, lule moj and Mirësia dhe e vërteta were performed by Tonin Tërshana and Albërie Hadërgjonaj respectively.

== Selected songs ==
- Kompozitori dhe fëmijët
- Bashkë me fëmijët
- A do të vish
- Kur jemi bashkë të dy
- Të dua ty
- E doni dashurinë
- Zemrat det i gjerë
- Vij drejt teje
- E parandjej
- Bashkë me vitet
- Djepi i trimërisë
- Kudo je ti
- Shokët
- Ditët që na presin
- Këngët e rinisë
