= Nallbani =

Nallbani is a surname. Notable people with the surname include:

- Blendi Nallbani (born 1971), Albanian football goalkeeper
- Ilir Nallbani (born 1982), Kosovar football midfielder
- Manjola Nallbani, Albanian opera singer
