= Mira Konçi =

Albanian singer (born 1973)

- Born: 4 March 1973 (age 53); Tirana, Albania
- Genres: Pop
- Occupation: Singer

Mira Konçi (born 4 March 1973) is an Albanian singer. She won the Festivali i Këngës twice in 1994 and 2002 with the respective songs "Të sotmen jeto" and "Brënda vetes më merr". She also won Kënga Magjike in 2002 with the song "E pathëna fjalë".

== Career ==
Konçi has participated in the Festivali i Këngës music festival several times. In 1994 and 2002, she won the competition with "Të somten jeto" in 1994, and "Brënda vetes më merr" in 2002, respectively. After the winner of the Festivali i Këngës was allowed to represent Albania in the Eurovision Song Contest, she has participated once, in 2007 together with Redon Makashi and with the song "Nën një qiell". There, they finished in sixth place. She has also participated in another popular music competition, Kënga Magjike. In 2002, she won with the song "E pathëna fëlë". In 2009, she finished in fourth place in the same competition with the song "Sy Femijë".

== Personal life ==
Prior to divorcing in 2021, Konçi was married to composer Shpëtim Saraçi and they had two children together.

Awards and achievements
| Preceded by Manjola Nallbani; Aurela Gaçe | Festivali i Këngës; Winner; 1994; 2002 | Succeeded by Ardit Gjebrea; Anjeza Shahini |
| Preceded by Rovena Dilo and Pirro Çako with "Për një çast më ndali zemra" | Kënga Magjike; Winner; 2002 | Succeeded by Ema Bytyçi with "Ku je ti" |
