= Mark Gurakuqi =

Albanian teacher and poet (1922–1970)

- Born: 2 November 1922; Pogradec, Principality of Albania
- Died: 16 July 1970 (aged 47); Tirana, Albania
- Occupations: Teacher; lecturer; poet; writer; critic; scholar

Mark Gurakuqi (Albanian pronunciation: [ˈmaɾk guɾa'kuci]; 2 November 1922 – 16 September 1970) was an Albanian teacher, lecturer, poet, writer, critic and scholar. He was a member of the famous Gurakuqi family from Shkodër, with a well-known patriotic, artistic, cultural, scientific and societal legacy.

== Life ==
Mark Gurakuqi was born on 2 November 1922 in Pogradec. His father Kolë Gurakuqi was playwright and a court registrar that served as such in Shkodër, Pogradec, Korçë, Tirana and Elbasan, while his younger brother Luigj followed on his brother's footsteps, eventually becoming a theatre director at the National Theatre of Opera and Ballet of Albania. He started his elementary education in Pogradec and then finished the normal school in Elbasan (later known as Shkolla Pedagogjike "Luigj Gurakuqi"). He initially pursued higher education in Florence, Italy, but left in 1943 to return to his home country and participate in the antifascist movement to liberate Albania. He was a member of the Committee of Antifascist University Students and participated in the Literary Archive of the Antifascist Youth of Tirana.

After the liberation of Albania, he was one of the first journalists of the only daily newspaper Bashkimi ("The Union"). He also collaborated with magazines of the time and with Radio-Tirana, writing literary-publicistic works and being active in the Literary Circle of Antifascist Youth of Tirana.

In 1946, he continued his higher education in Belgrade but would graduate in literature at the Sofia University in Bulgaria due to the worsening relations between the two countries. Immediately after graduating, on the autumn of 1950 he started working as a literature teacher at the Qemal Stafa High School. After the founding of the University of Tirana in 1957, he worked as a lecturer at the History-Philology faculty until his death on 16 September 1970. For his contributions he was awarded posthumously with the title of Mësues i Merituar ("Merited Teacher").

== Work ==
Aside from his educational and pedagogical work, Gurakuqi also published literary and scientific works. His first published work was Skica dhe tregime ("Sketches and Stories") in 1945, and would continue with a number of poem collections, prose creations and children's books, such as Kangë për jetën ("Songs About Life") (1951), Pranverë ("Spring") (1953), Kangë për dashuninë ("Songs About Love") (1957), Në udhët e jetës ("On the Roads of Life") (1960), Në gjurmët e viteve ("On the Traces of the Years") (1964), Në rrjedhë të viteve ("On the Stream of the Years") (1968), Gjurmë të padukshme ("Invisible Traces") (1971). He also wrote the lyrics to the song Të dua o det ("I Love You o Sea"), which would be performed by Tonin Tërshana in Festivali i Këngës in 1965, winning first prize in the process.

As a writer and lecturer he would also pivot towards critical publications. His studies number some 60 works on the literary works of contemporary authors such as Drago Siliqi, Kolë Jakova, Luan Qafëzezi, Dritëro Agolli, Dhori Qiriazi, etc.

He also studied the literary tradition of Albanian authors, especially for the years spanning 1912 to 1944. Here, most known are his articles on Ndre Mjeda, Luigj Gurakuqi, Andon Zako Çajupi, etc. A valued contribution of Gurakuqi are his studies on Arbëreshe literature. On his publication on the selected creations of Luigj Gurakuqi in 1961, he wrote a lengthy and detailed study on the subject's life and works. In 1966, he published the book Autorë dhe probleme të viteve ‘30 ("Authors and Problems of the 30s"), a summary of studies on the artistic works of Migjeni, Nonda Bulka, Kristaq Cepa, Petro Marko, Aleks Çaçi, Andrea Varfi and Gaspër Pali. The third volume of Historia e letërsisë shqipe ("History of Albanian Literature"), prepared by Gurakuqi, Vehbi Bala and Jup Kastrati under the scientific direction of Dhimitër Shuteriqi and redaction of Koço Bihiku was banned during its printing process in 1968. The work would have encompassed the history of Albanian literature from 1912 up to 1939, and the last time the works of Gjergj Fishta, Faik Konica and Giuseppe Schirò would institutionally evaluated. Meanwhile, his monograph titled Mbi veprën poetike të Ndre Mjedës ("On the Poetic Work of Ndre Mjeda"), with many previously unknown facts, would get published ten years after his death in 1980.

== Bibliography ==
Title	Year
"Skica dhe tregime"	1945
"Miniera nuk u mbyll"	1951
"Kangë për jetën"	1951
"Pranverë"	1953
"Gjeto Plaku"	1955
"Kangë për dashurinë"	1957
"Në udhët e jetës"	1960
"Në gjurmët e viteve"	1964
"Porosia e fundit e Gjergj Kastriotit"	1967
"Në rrjedhë të viteve"	1968
"Gjurmë të padukshme"	1971
"Mbi veprën poetike të Mjedës"	1980
"Vepra letrare"	1986
