= Alida Hisku =

Albanian singer (born 1957)

- Born: 20 June 1957 (age 68); Tirana, People's Republic of Albania
- Genres: Easy listening, Pop
- Years active: 1970-1982; 2006-present

Alida Hisku (born 20 June 1957) is an Albanian singer who was especially popular in the 1970s. Since 1990, she has lived in Germany.

== Life ==
Hisku was born on 20 June 1957 in Tirana, then the capital of the Communist People's Republic of Albania. As the daughter of the opera singer Fiqrete Hisku, she began singing at a very young age, like her older sister and younger brother. As a child, Alida Hisku won several singing competitions. She studied in the "Jordan Misja" Artistic Lyceum in Tirana. At the age of 13, she debuted in the National Song Festival (Albanian: Festivali i Këngës) organized by the Albanian National Television (RTSh), then one of the few and the most prestigious. She ranked second with the song "Portret" (Portrait) composed by Agim Krajka, which made her known throughout the country. Her major success came in the competitions of 1974, with the song "Vajzat e fshatit tim" (Girls from my village), and 1975, with the song "Buka e duarve tona" (Bread from our own hands), where she ranked first and won in both cases. She won other prizes during the competitions of 1976, 1979, 1980 and 1981, collecting a total of five second places, making her one of the top Albanian singers of the time. During this period, she toured various European countries with Albanian artistic tour groups.

Her singing career was halted in 1982, when she was arrested by the Sigurimi with the pretence of committing "agitation and propaganda against the government", while being a member of the Party of Labour of Albania, the Central Committee of the BRPSh, and studying in the political V.I. Lenin Higher Party Institution. The compromising evidence was a brief comment in her personal diary, mentioning the harsh living conditions of the cooperatives workers in the provinces. The diary was read, stolen, and handed over to the authorities. The long interrogation period and the risk of persecution and retaliation towards family and friends of a suspected political "enemy" led to her divorce from her husband, with Hisku obtaining custody of their two sons later through difficulties. Nevertheless, she was not imprisoned. With the beginning of the fall of communism in Albania, in 1990, she fled with her two children to Germany, where she applied for political asylum.

She remarried in Germany, and gave birth to a daughter. In 2005, after 15 years, she returned for the first time to the Albanian singing scene on a show of an Albanian TV station where she sang a few songs and was voted the best singer of the 1970s. The following year, her new album Kthimi (The comeback) came out. In 2009, she published an autobiography entitled Die Hofnärrin des Diktators – Von der Propaganda missbraucht, vom Publikum geliebt, von den Mächtigen verboten (The dictator's fool - abused by the propaganda, loved by the audience, forbidden by the powerful).

== Publications ==
- Die Hofnärrin des Diktators – Von der Propaganda missbraucht, vom Publikum geliebt, von den Mächtigen verboten [The dictator's fool - abused by the propaganda, loved by the audience, forbidden by the powerful], ed. Annette Piechutta, Fulda Parzeller, 2009. ISBN 9783790004144.
