= Fëmija i parë =

Song by Vaçe Zela
- Language: Albanian
- Composer: Abdulla Grimci
- Lyricist: Dionis Bubani

"Fëmija I Parë" is one of the most famous songs of Albanian singer Vaçe Zela. It was the first song to win Festivali i Këngës. The song is about a happy mother who is thrilled to have been blessed with a child in her life.

Over the years, several covers of the song have been made. In December 2011, at the Festivali in Këngës 50's gala night, the popular singer Anjeza Shahini performed her version of the song.
