= Rudina Magjistari =

Albanian television presenter (born 1975)

- Born: 26 August 1975 (age 51); Tirana, PSR Albania
- Occupations: Television presenter; program author; producer; entrepreneur
- Years active: 1990–present
- Employer: TV Klan
- Known for: Host of the daily talk show Rudina

Rudina Magjistari (born 26 August 1975) is an Albanian television presenter, producer and program author. She is best known as the host of the daily talk show Rudina airing on TV Klan.

== Early life and career ==
She began her television career at the age of 15, appearing in various programs and formats. Her first on-screen appearance was in a New Year's Eve program alongside comedian Koço Devole, followed by the youth entertainment show Europa ’91. She has hosted the Festivali i Këngës three times (1991, 1992, and 1996).

In the 1990s, she worked with [Albanian Public Television Broadcast (RTSH), the only television broadcaster in Albania at the time. In 2000, she moved to the private television network TV Klan, where she presented the game show Porta e Fatit for two years. She later hosted Maratona e Këngës Popullore, a competition for traditional Albanian music.

In 2004, she debuted as both presenter and producer with the weekly show Taksi e rezervuar. She also hosted the Çmimet Kult awards in 2005 and 2006. In 2008, she launched the weekly program Tkam zemër, which focused on ordinary people and their personal stories.

For many years, Magjistari has hosted her daily program on TV Klan, initially titled Takimi i Pasdites. After a one-year break from television following the birth of her daughter, she returned in September 2016 with the show renamed Rudina. The program airs Monday through Saturday at 17:00 on TV Klan.
