= Esat Teliti =

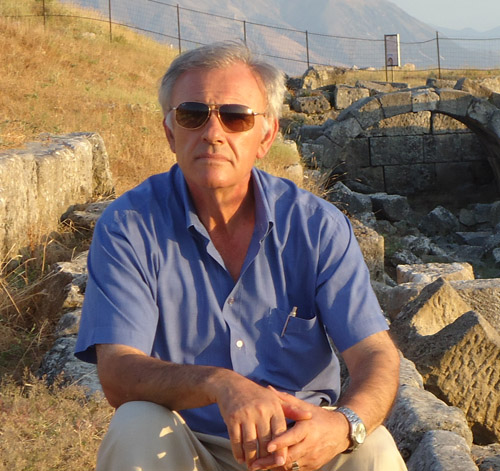
Esat Teliti

Esat Teliti (born 27 December 1950 in Kavajë) is an Albanian filmmaker, producer, and former actor. After graduating from the Academy of Fine Arts in 1972 with a degree in drama, he began working at Radio Televizioni Shqiptar where he has been involved in the production of many documentaries and short films. In 1974, he co-hosted the National Song Festival alongside Arta Dade. Since October 2003, Teliti has been working as artistic director and contributor for Pasqyra Shqiptare TV show, a weekly program in the Albanian language aired by OMNI 1 Television in Toronto for the Albanian community in Canada.
