= Skënder Sallaku =

Albanian comedian and actor

- Born: 25 January 1935; Tirana, Kingdom of Albania
- Died: 11 February 2014 (aged 79); Tirana, Albania
- Occupations: Comic, actor
- Awards: People's Artist

Skënder Sallaku (25 January 1935 – 11 February 2014) was an Albanian comedian and actor, recipient of the People's Artist of Albania award. He was also a notable national champion of Albania in Greco-Roman wrestling. His filmography includes Estrada në ekran (1968), Cirku në fshat (1977), Gjuetia e fundit (1992) and Revolja e humbur (1995). Sallaku died in Tirana with family at his side in the morning of 11 February 2014.

== Sources ==
- Kulla, Pëllumb; Various (2002). Skënder Sallaku, ose, Si qeshnim nën diktaturë. Arbri. ISBN 978-99927-615-9-5.
