= Gurakuqi =

Gurakuqi, Goracuchi is an Albanian surname. Notable people with the surname include:

- Alessandro Goracuchi (1807–1887), scientist, doctor and diplomat in 19th-century Austrian Istria
- Karl Gurakuqi (1895–1971), Albanian linguist and folklorist
- Luigj Gurakuqi (1879–1925), Albanian writer and politician
- Mark Gurakuqi (1922–1970), Albanian teacher, lecturer, poet, writer, critic and scholar
