= Anita Bitri =

- Born: January 8, 1968; Sarandë, Albania
- Died: October 19, 2004 (aged 36) Staten Island, New York, U.S.
- Genre: Pop music

Anita Bitri Prapaniku (8 January 1968 – 19 October 2004) was an Albanian-American pop singer. Bitri had her first music success at the age of sixteen, and she became popular in Albania with her song "First Love". She emigrated to the United States in 1996.

She was found dead in her Staten Island home along with her 8-year-old daughter Sibora Nini and 60-year-old mother Azbije. The three died due to an accidental carbon monoxide poisoning after boiler ventilators in the basement were stuffed with plastic bags to keep out concrete from construction work. Her husband, Luan Prapaniku, had recently died from cancer.

At the time of her death, she was in the process of recording two albums, one in Albanian and one in English.

== See also ==
- Parashqevi Simaku
