= E Diell =

Albanian Sunday television program (since 2008)

- Genre: Variety show Talk show Interview; Music
- Presented by: Edi Manushi
- Country of origin: Albania
- Original language: Albanian

Production
- Running time: 120 minutes

Original release
- Network: Top Channel
- Release: 2008 – present

E Diell (English: On Sunday) is an Albanian weekly television programme broadcast every Sunday at midday on Top Channel. The format combines entertainment, interviews, live music performances, and thematic segments.

== Format ==
The programme features a mix of segments including interviews with guests from various fields, cultural features, live music, and debate sections on current issues. A notable segment is "Rrethi Katror" ("Square Circle"), where public figures such as Alfred Cako and Bledi Mane discuss social and political topics in a debate format. Another recurring segment, "Gurra", focuses on traditional Albanian music and its history.

== History ==
E Diell premiered in 2008 on Top Channel. Since its launch, the programme has undergone several changes in both format and presenters. Previous hosts have included Adi Krasta, while the current moderator is Edi Manushi.
