= Elbasan Street =

Street in Tirana, Albania

Coordinates: 41°19′10″N 19°49′35″E

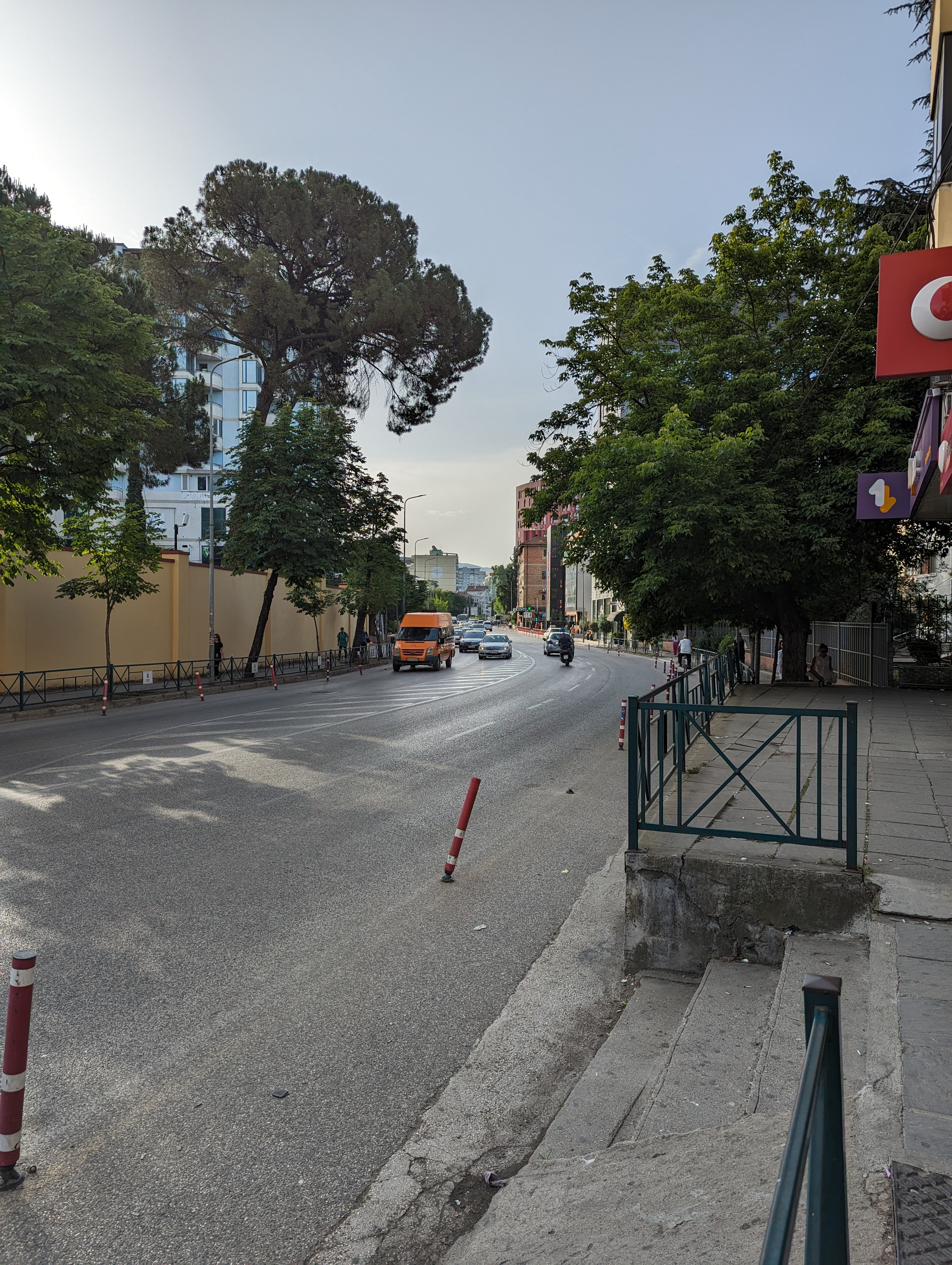
Elbasan Street close to the US Embassy

Elbasan Street (Albanian: Rruga e Elbasanit, formerly Rruga Labinoti) is a major street of Tirana, Albania. It is the most important street of southern Tirana leading to national road SH3 and European Route E852. It eventually leads to Elbasan. The Consular section of the US Embassy in Tirana and the Jordan Misja Artistic Lyceum are located on Elbasan Street.
