= Vera Grabocka =

Albanian television director and producer (born 1950)

- Born: March 21, 1950 (age 76); Tirana, PR Albania
- Occupations: Television director Producer
- Years active: 1970s–present
- Spouse: Timo Flloko
- Children: 1

Vera Grabocka (born March 21, 1950) is an Albanian television director and television producer, best known for directing the Albanian editions of "X Factor" and "Your Face Sounds Familiar" on TV Klan, as well as producing national pageants such as "Miss Universe Albania".

== Career ==
Grabocka’s early work in television includes directing the dance competition 12 Vallëzime pa një të Shtunë, which first aired on RTSH in 1992 and is considered one of the earliest televised dance programs in Albania, presented by Adi Krasta.

She appeared as an actress in the 1970 Albanian film Montatorja at age 19, before transitioning into television in the 1980s with Albanian Radio and Television (RTSH). In the 1990s, she directed entertainment events such as Miss Albania, World Folk, and I Love Albania More. She worked in the U.S. from 1997 to 1999 on international pageants including Miss Globe before returning to Albania. She directed franchise shows for local television including X Factor Albania (2012, 2015 seasons) and Your Face Sounds Familiar Albania (2016). Grabocka was involved in directing Kënga Magjike during 2003 and 2004.

Additionally, she contributed to productions related to Festivali i Këngës and Miss Universe.

In the mid‑2010s, Grabocka and Alketa Vejsiu produced Dance With Me Albania (2014–2019), a celebrity dance series. Since 2018, she has led programs including Në Kurthin e Piter Pan, a children’s entertainment show, and Love Story Albania, a reality dating program launched in 2020, co-produced with Alketa Vejsiu.

== Personal life ==
Grabocka is married to Albanian actor and writer Timo Flloko, who holds the title Artist i Merituar. The couple have a daughter named Linda.

== Selected television programs ==
- 12 Vallëzime pa një të Shtunë – televised dance competition (RTSH, 1992)
- Miss Albania – national beauty pageant (since early 1990s)
- World Folk – folk music show (1999)
- I Love Albania More – patriotic variety show (late 1990s)
- Miss Globe – international pageant aired in the United States (c. 1999)
- X Factor Albania – seasons aired in 2012 and 2015
- Your Face Sounds Familiar Albania – local adaptation (2016)
- Dance With Me Albania – celebrity dance series (2014–2019)
- Ne Kurthin e Piter Pan – children’s entertainment show (from 2018)
- Love Story Albania – reality dating show (launched 2020)
- Kënga Magjike – music competition (2003–2004)
- *Miss World* – international beauty pageant (2015–2018)
- Festivali i Këngës – annual music festival and competition
- Miss Universe – international beauty pageant
