= Adi Krasta =

Albanian journalist and television presenter (born 1972)

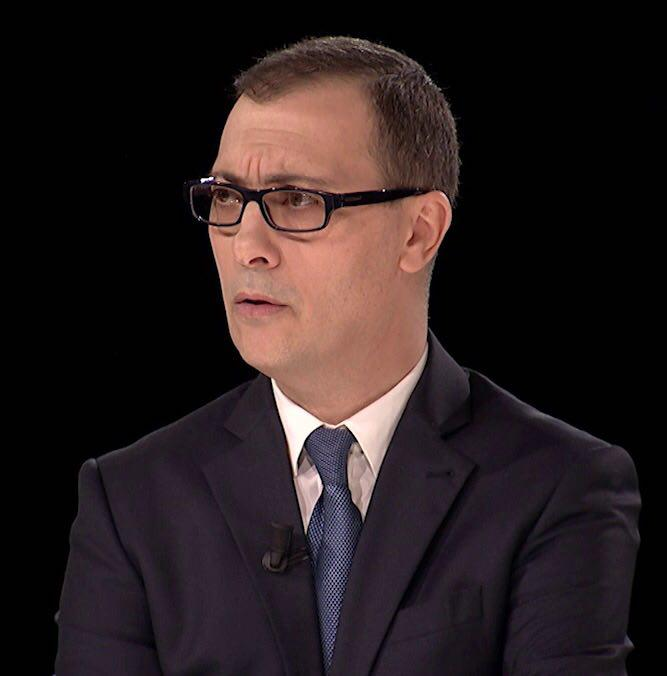
- Krasta in 2015 on his show A Krasta Show

Deputy Director General of Radio Television of Kosovo (RTK)
- In office 14 January 2023 – 28 October 2024

Personal details
- Born: Adrian Krasta; April 12, 1972 (age 54) Tirana, PR Albania
- Spouse: Brikena Krasta
- Children: 2
- Education: State University of New York at Fredonia
- Occupation: Journalist, television presenter

Adi Krasta (born April 12, 1972) is an Albanian journalist and television presenter. From January 2023 to October 2024, he served as Deputy Director General of Radio Television of Kosovo.

== Early life and education ==
Krasta was born on 12 April 1972 in Tirana. His paternal grandfather and father, Shaqir Krasta, were physicians, while his maternal grandfather and he himself pursued engineering. In 1995, he completed postgraduate studies at the State University of New York at Fredonia. His thesis advisor was Ted Schwalbe.

== Career ==
Krasta began working at Radio Tirana in 1990 after completing his university studies in natural sciences. He joined the station's Culture Department and created the program Life, Culture, Art. He has been continuously active in radio since 1987.

His first television appearance was in the program Literature and its Reflections in Art, co-hosted with Mira Bedalli. In 1991, he hosted Cultural Evenings with Rovena Dilo. In 1992, he launched and hosted the magazine-format program Spektër. From 1993 to 1995, he led the three-season program 12 Weeks (12 vallëzime pa një të shtunë), directed by Vera Grabocka.

Krasta served as director of Radio Koha in 1997 and as general director of the sports channel Telesport in 2002. He also lectured in Public Relations, a field in which he has been specialized since 1996.

He hosted five editions of the Festivali i Këngës on Albanian national television RTSH. From 1999 to 2002, he worked as a journalist-producer for the Albanian section of the BBC World Service in London. Upon returning to Albania, he co-created the music talent show Ethet e së Premtes Mbrëma with Pali Kuke.

After the closure of Agon Channel, Krasta returned to Top Channel to lead the Sunday program E Diell, in a second collaboration that ended on 18 June 2017. After an 18-month break from television, he launched the weekly talk show A Show on News 24 in 2018 that later aired at Syri Tv. In August 2019, it was reported that he would no longer continue with A Show, generating public speculation about the reasons behind the termination. He appears also as judge, at judge panel of X Factor Albania season 5 and 6.

== Personal life ==
Krasta is married to Brikena Krasta and they have two children. In 2022, he was granted Kosovan citizenship.
