= Ferdinand Deda =

Albanian composer

Ferdinand Deda MA PA
- Born: 5 February 1941; Peqin, Albania
- Died: 22 August 2003 (aged 62)
- Occupations: Composer; conductor
- Musical career
- Genres: Folk; symphony
- Instruments: Piano, accordion

Ferdinand Deda (Albanian pronunciation: [ˈfɛɾdinand ˈdɛda]; 5 February 1941 – 22 August 2003) was an Albanian composer, conductor and instrumentalist.

== Life and career ==
Ferdinand Deda was born in Peqin in 1941 during the Italian occupation of Albania. His first lessons in music started when he was 6 and later studying in the Jordan Misja Artistic Lyceum in Tirana. After finishing his studies in 1959 he worked as a music teacher in Gjirokastër until 1960. Some time later he enrolled in the Prague Conservatory, but would stop shortly thereafter due to the Albanian–Soviet split, finishing school as a conductor in Albania instead. He would then specialize in Italy in composition and conducting from 1991 to 1992.

Starting from 1964, he would compose over 300 concertos both in Albania and abroad. Deda was also the founder of Festivali i Pranverës (Spring Festival).

His son, Elton Deda is also a musician and composer.
