= Mrika =

Mrika (Maria) is an opera in three acts composed by Prenkë Jakova with a libretto in Albanian by Llazar Siliqi. It premiered (in a four-act version) in Shkoder, Albania in 1958 at the Migjeni Theatre. The revised three-act version (and the one used today) premiered in Tirana at the Academy of Music and Arts of Albania in December 1959. The work is based on a "musical action" in two scenes, Dritë mbi Shqipëri (Light over Albania), a previous collaboration between Jakova and Siliqi which had premiered in Tirana in July 1952. Mrika is popularly considered to be the first Albanian opera. Its first stage director was Kristaq Antoniu.
