= People's Artist (Albania) =

Honorary title in communist Albania

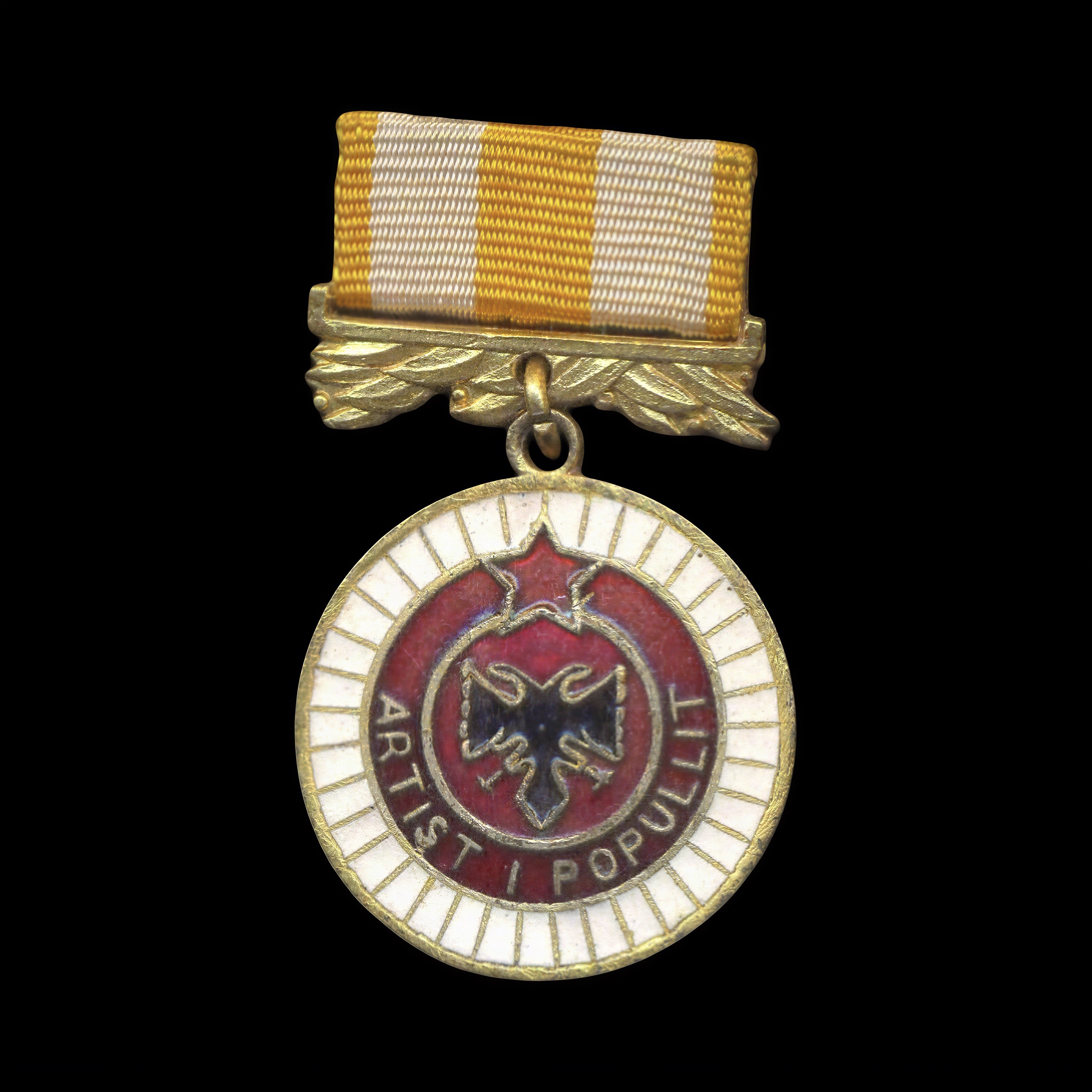
- Native name: Artist i Popullit
- Type: State decoration
- Country: People's Socialist Republic of Albania
- Presented by: The Presidium of the People's Assembly
- Ribbon: Gold with two white stripes
- Status: Discontinued
- Established: 26 October 1960
- Ribbon bar

The People's Artist (Albanian: Artist i Popullit; Artiste e Popullit) was an honorary title for outstanding art performers of the People's Socialist Republic of Albania, whose merits were exceptional in the sphere of development of the performing arts (theatre, music, cinema and art). It was created by law in 1960 and amended in 1980. The title is no longer given in Albania after the law was amended in 1996. The equivalent of it became the "Grand Master of Work" title, that was also substituted with the "Grand Master" title after a 2001 amendment of the 1996 law.

== Creation ==
Founded on 26 October 1960, the honorary title of “Artist of the People” was bestowed upon singers, composers, orchestra directors, musicians, stage managers, ballet dancers, and actors in theater, cinema, and opera whose works displayed great artistic value towards the development of the performing arts in the People's Socialist Republic of Albania. When first established, the recipient of the title only received a certificate from the Presidium of the People’s Assembly. Sometime in the mid to late 1960s, a badge was created as an outward symbol of the title. The badge consisted of a round gilt or brass medal 27 mm (1.1 in) in diameter with white enameled base with thin rays, upon which is a ruby red enamel band with inscription ARTIST I POPULLIT, at the center a black enameled Albanian double headed eagle on a bright red circle, surmounted by ruby red star. The back of the badge is plain.

Its recipients include many of the country's most-acclaimed composers, dancers, singers, film and theatre directors and actors. Normally, a person was named the People's Artist after 40 years of age. An exception was made for ballet dancers.

== Recipients ==
- Agron Aliaj – choreographer
- Albert Vërria – actor
- Avni Mula – singer and composer
- Çesk Zadeja – composer
- Dhimitër Anagnosti – film director
- Endri Keko – film director
- Esma Agolli – actress
- Fatime Sokoli – folk singer
- Feim Ibrahimi – composer
- Gaqo Avrazi – conductor
- Gaqo Çako – opera singer
- Ibrahim Madhi – violinist
- Ibrahim Tukiçi – singer
- Jorgjia Filçe-Truja – opera singer
- Kadri Roshi – actor
- Kristaq Antoniu – singer and actor
- Kristaq Dhamo – film director
- Kujtim Spahivogli – actor and theatre director
- Lec Shllaku – actor and theatre director
- Lola Gjoka – pianist
- Loro Kovaçi – actor
- Luftar Paja – actor and comedian
- Marie Logoreci – actress
- Margarita Xhepa – actress
- Marjana Daja – ballet dancer
- Melpomeni Çobani – actress
- Mentor Xhemali – singer
- Mihal Popi – actor
- Mirush Kabashi – actor
- Mustafa Krantja – conductor
- Naim Frashëri – actor
- Ndrek Luca – actor and theatre director
- Ndue Shyti – musician
- Nikolin Xhoja – actor
- Nikolla Zoraqi – composer
- Pandi Raidhi – actor
- Panajot Kanaçi – choreographer
- Pjetër Gaci – composer
- Pjetër Gjoka – actor
- Pirro Mani – actor and theatre director
- Ramiz Kovaçi – opera singer
- Reshat Arbana – actor
- Rifat Teqja – conductor
- Robert Ndrenika – actor
- Roza Anagnosti – actress
- Sandër Prosi – actor
- Serafin Fanko – actor and theatre director
- Skënder Sallaku – actor and comedian
- Sulejman Pitarka – actor and playwright
- Tano Banushi – actor and comedian
- Tefta Tashko-Koço – opera singer
- Tinka Kurti – actress
- Tish Daija – composer
- Vaçe Zela – singer
- Viktor Gjika – film director
- Violeta Manushi – actress
- Vitore Çeli – theatre director
- Xhanfise Keko – film director
- Zef Deda – actor and comedian
- Zihni Berati – singer

== See also ==
- Orders, decorations and medals of Albania
- Merited Artist of Albania
- People's Artist
