= Prenk Jakova =

Albanian musician (1917–1969)

Prenk Jakova AP NK
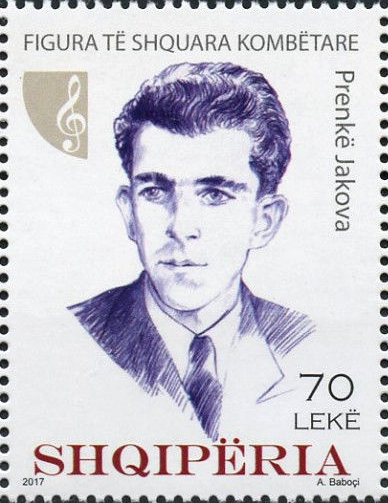
- Jakova on a 2017 stamp of Albania
- Born: 27 June 1917; Shkodër, Albania
- Died: 16 September 1969 (aged 52); Tirana, Albania
- Occupation: Composer
- Style: Classical; Romantic; 20th century; Contemporary
- Awards: Honor of the Nation

Prenk Jakova (Albanian pronunciation: [ˈpɾɛnk jaˈkɔva]; 27 June 1917 – 19 September 1969) was an Albanian composer, musician, and author of Mrika (1958), which is considered the first Albanian opera. A native of Shkodër, he studied under Martin Gjoka and Zef Kurti, and he was also an alumnus of the Accademia Nazionale di Santa Cecilia. A virtuoso clarinetist he worked as a music teacher for most of his life and distinguished himself as the mentor of the four most important composers of classical music from northern Albania: Çesk Zadeja, Tish Daija, Tonin Harapi, and Simon Gjoni. Jakova was the director of the music band and of the House of Culture of Shkodër. Besides Mrika, Jakova also composed Skënderbeu, another opera which premiered in 1968.

Along the operas Jakova left to posterity many songs and other musical pieces, several of which are commonly believed to be Albanian folk music, rather they are Jakova's compositions. He committed suicide at the heat of hard work he had taken on and also because of the bad health state of his mother. He is regarded as one of the best Albanian composers.

== Early life ==
Prenk Jakova was born on 27 June 1917 in Shkodër, northern Albania. His family's background was from Gjakova, from which originated the last name. His grandfather, Dedë Jakova, was a clarinetist at the Shkodër Jesuit College, whereas Prenkë's father, Kolë Dedë Jakova, was a commander in the Albanian army.

Jakova went to elementary school in 1924–1929 and from there he pursued secondary studies in the Illyricum Lycee of his native city. When in high school, he switched from the classical concentration into the general gymnasium, which he finished in 1935. During his high school years he was part of the musical band of school and also, encouraged from his father, he started acting in the theatrical associations Bogdani and Vllaznia. Later, the school band became the city's band, and Jakova its clarinetist. During that period Jakova started to write musical motifs based on well known folk songs such as Delja rudë (English: The Sheep), Hajredini (English: Hayredin), Besa e një trimi (English: The Besa of a Brave Man), and Shkoj e vi flutrim si zogu (English: I Come and Go Flying Like a Bird). His two musical teachers were Martin Gjoka and Zef Kurti, probably the most important Albanian musicians of northern Albania at that time.

== Work ==
At 18, Jakova was nominated artistic director of his school band and his first students were Çesk Zadeja, Tish Daija, Tonin Harapi, Simon Gjoni, Tonin Rrota, Zef Gruda, and many other famous Albanian composers. Jakova started to compose marches and other pieces. On 2 January 1936 he was sent to teach in Bërdicë where he took care of the musical education of the children. There he learned to play the guitar. During the summer of 1939 he purchased an accordion and learned that too. At that point he was an advanced, sometimes virtuoso player of the clarinet, the guitar, and the accordion. In 1939 Jakova went to teach in Orosh, Mirditë District, where he wrote a piece for accordion entitled "Mall" (English: Nostalgia), and later the song "Fyelli i Bariut" (English: The Shepard's Flute), whose text is unknown to us today. This was the first song of Jakova whose text and music had been both composed by him, according to the tradition of the aheng from Shkodër (English: the Shkodër Serenade). In 1940 Jakova was transferred back to Shkodër where he started a cycle of songs for children and an operetta on two acts entitled "Kopshti i Xhuxhmaxhuxhëve" (English: The Dwarfs' Yard). In the academic year 1941–42, Jakova was again transferred in Katërkollë, a village close to Ulqin and Osho in the Krajë region of Yugoslavia, to where he would commute with his bike from Shkodër, covering 50 kilometres (31 mi) every day. In 1942 he went to study clarinet at the Accademia Nazionale di Santa Cecilia in Rome, Italy where he finished with excellent results.

In 1944 Jakova was hired by the chorus of the First Partisan Brigade of the House of the Youth where he was named director. During this time he was arrested by the communist regime and held in prison because his brother had been an opponent of the regime, persecuted, and killed by the communists. His former alumni, Çesk Zadeja and Tonin Harapi witnessed that, once released from the prison, Jakova went back to work and started to go to work at 7 in the morning and go back home only by late night. The group gave performances not only in Shkodër but also in various cities of Yugoslavia, such as Ulqin, Cetinje, Titograd etc. In 1947, Jakova wrote a cycle of songs entitled "Dasma Shkodrane" (English: The Shkodër Wedding), with which he represented his city in a song festival in Tirana. During 1948–1951, Jakova worked as a music teacher in two schools of Shkodër and never quit for a single day practices of the chorus and the orchestra of the House of Culture of Shkodër. At that time he composed the song "Gruri i ri" (English: The New Wheat) with a text of Dhimitër Shuteriqi, which was put on stage from Pjetër Gjoka along with other songs which were brought to the 1950 Festival in Tirana.

At the beginning of the 1952 festival in Albania there were high quality soloists and good symphonic orchestras. In June 1952 poet Llazar Siliqi was put in charge to write a poetry on youth's work on a new hydroelectric power station, which was being built on the Mat river. The piece started as a song, but afterward it took a longer shape and was divided into two movements called Dritë mbi Shqipëri (English: Lights on Albania), and was presented in 1952 in Tirana. The piece was nothing but the embryo of the first Albanian opera, Mrika, which was worked upon by Jakova in the following 6 years and eventually rehearsed on 2 May 1958, and put on stage on 12 November 1958. Rehearsing was done in the House of Culture, the Old Theatre and the new Migjeni Theatre in Shkodër. On 27 November the general rehearsal was given and on 1 December 1958 the opera premiered in the Migjeni Theatre, and after some performances in the city, on 27 and 28 December it showed in the theater of the Academy of Music and Arts of Albania, where Enver Hoxha, then Albania's premier, assisted it. At the end of the show Kadri Hazbiu, then Minister of Interior, thanked all the artists and raised a toast to Jakova. The event was considered important and Jakova received telegrams of congratulations from many of his peer composers all around the world for the success of his first opera.

The extraordinary success of Mrika led to an encounter between Enver Hoxha and Jakova. Hoxha asked Jakova to write another opera, this time on Albanian national hero, Skanderbeg, but Jakova answered that "operas are not like loafs which can be put in the oven at any time". It is reported that Hoxha laughed at that response and that he immediately assured Jakova, that he personally would provide to all the necessary conditions to guarantee the opera's success. Skënderbeu would indeed premiere 10 years after Mrika and was of a much better artistic quality then Mrika. Jakova worked very intensively on the music while at the same time he had other responsibilities as the director of the House of Culture and also teaching assignments. He spent several months only on the work of separating the Turkish music from the Arabic one, which was one of the elements of the opera, and many classical composers struggled with, because of the very distant relationship between classical music and oriental one. When Jakova finished the opera, he brought it to Tirana for an approval, but he was asked to review many parts of it. Jakova categorically refused to revise, eventually Fadil Paçrami, then Minister of Culture, backed him up. Although Skënderbeu was a great success, and Jakova was congratulated by Enver Hoxha, the vicissitudes of its realization had heavy consequences on Jakova's spirit. This occurred when Jakova's mother was paralyzed at home. The stress accumulated and the despair of a heavy life without recognition, brought him to attempt to kill himself on 9 September 1969, by throwing himself from the second floor of the House of Culture of Shkodër. He eventually died a few days later, on 16 September 1969 in a Tirana hospital, from the fatal wounds. The people of Shkodër, shocked and embittered for the great composer, organized an imposing funeral procession for Albania's greatest musician and composer of that time. The procession was unattended by public authorities, with the exception of the secretary of the Albanian League of Writers and Artists. The death ceremony was accompanied by the sounds of the musical band of the city of Shkodër, which Jakova himself had created.

== Legacy ==
Jakova left a very important musical heritage. Beside the two operas there are dozens of songs, orchestral and choral pieces, movies' music, and operettas that he left to posterity. Jakova is considered as one of the most important Albanian composers of all times.

He composed the operas Mrika in 1958 and Skanderberg in 1968, for which he is known as the creator of the Albanian national opera. His operas were influenced by traditional Italian opera, the belcanto style and Albanian folk song.

Jakova has also become noted for many folk Albanian songs, which are so widespread, that there is an erroneous belief that they are traditional Albanian popular songs, whereas they are instead composed by Jakova. One of his most famous songs is Margjelo.

== Operas ==
- Mrika (1958)
- Gjergj Kastrioti-Skënderbeu (1968)
