= Albanian National Song and Dance Ensemble =

The Albanian National Song and Dance Ensemble (Albanian: Ansambli i Këngëve dhe Valleve Popullore) is one of Albania's oldest ongoing national-level performance groups, created in 1957 in Tirana, Albania. The first directors were musician Çesk Zadeja and choreographer Gëzim Kaçeli. The ensemble still performs live music, usually at the National Theatre of Opera and Ballet of Albania.
