= Skifter Këlliçi =

Albanian writer

Skifter Këlliçi (born January 17, 1938), is an Albanian fiction writer, screenwriter, sports journalist, and radio & TV personality. He started the first radio program that broadcast live sports events in 1958 on Radio Televizioni Shqiptar, the Rubrika Sportive, a show that continues to this day, and later did the same on the Albanian television. He has been a successful screenwriter with movies such as Pas gjurmëve (English: Following the tracks), winner of the international Giffoni Film Festival, Italy, in 1979.

== Life and work ==
Skifter Këlliçi was born on January 17, 1938, in Tirana, Albania, where he finished his secondary studies in 1955. In 1959, he graduated from the University of Tirana in Albanian Language and Literature, and started working as a journalist and a sports' commentator at the Radio Televizioni Shqiptar, where he had already interned, starting from 1958. He pioneered a very well known radio show, called Rubrika sportive, which would comment on the sports events of the weekend. Later, Këlliçi would start the same show in the Albanian Television, thus becoming the first anchorman of this show, which still continues today. Because of a long political persecution during the years 1975-1985, Këlliçi could no longer host the Rubrika sportive show in the Albanian television. He returned as an anchorman in 1985, but was again politically persecuted in 1986, and disappeared once more from the screens. Along with Anton Mazreku, and Ismet Bellova, Këlliçi is considered one of the most renowned sports commentators in the Albanian speaking world.

Këlliçi has also been successful in creative and nonfiction writing, a field in which he has published more than 20 books, consisting of short stories, novels, as well as screenplays. Among them are children's novels like 'Kujtimet e mëhallës së vjetër' (English: Memories from the old neighborhood), (1967), and 'Pas gjurmëve' (English: Following the tracks), (1972). The later was the basis for Këlliçi's screenplay of the movie with the same title, which won the Prize of the President of the Italian Republic at the International Giffoni Film Festival, Italy in 1979, and 'Shpërthimi' (English: The Explosion) (1983), on whose motives he also wrote the screenplay of the movie 'Fushë e blertë, fushë e kuqe' (English: Green field, red field)(1985).

Among his novels the most successful ones have been those with historical motives such as 'Atentat ne Paris' (English: Assassination in Paris), 1978 (which was republished with significant changes me 2011), 'Vrasës me duar te bardha (English: White hands killers), 1991, 'Dashuri e gdhendur ne shkemb" (English: Love carved in stone) (2004), where he represents Illyria of year 9 A.D. in its revolt against Roman Empire, led by Tiberius, the son of Octavian, Roman Emperor. According to critics, the book has a well framed Albanian national vision.

In 2010 Këlliçi published the novel "Shtatori i gjëmës së madhe" (English: The September of Great Calamity), (2010), dedicated to the September 11 attacks on the Twin Towers in New York City, which, among its 3,000 victims, included three Albanian-Americans, personified in the novel. A year later he published "Politikanët mëkatarë fluturojnë në Mars" (English: Wretched politicians fly to Mars)), (2011), a sarcastic novel with characters that are not difficult to spot from the Albanian political scene, where they are shown to be utterly corrupted.

Among his work as a publicist a special mention is deserved by 'Futbolli Shqiptar' (English: Albanian soccer), (1988), which he co-authored with Belgian sports journalist, Serge Van Hoof, "Nga 2-3-5, në 4-4-2, vështrim historik mbi evoluimin e sistemeve taktike të futbollit shqiptar, (1930-1987)", (English: From 2-3-5, to 4-4-2, a historical view on the evolution of tactical systems in Albanian soccer, (1930-1987))(1987) and 'Historia e Radiotelevizionit Shqiptar,(1930-1990)', (English: History of the Albanian Radio-Television,(1930-1990)')(2003).

In 1999 Skifter Këlliçi emigrated to Boston, United States, where he currently resides. He has continued to publish in the Albanian press, as well as several fictional and historical books.

== Other sources ==
1. Dhurata Hamzai, Shqiptarja.com, 16 mars 2014: 'Atentat ne Paris, atentat kunder mediokritetit te stilit'
2. Klara Kodra, 'Tribuna shqiptare, 15 maj 2011: Patosi tragjiko-heroik i nje romani'
