= Manjola Nallbani =

Albanian singer

- Born: Tirana, Albania
- Genres: Opera; folk
- Occupation: Singer

Manjola Nallbani is an Albanian opera singer. Nallbani is known for having won the Festivali i Këngës three times: in 1989, 1992 and 1993.

== Career ==
After graduating in 1991, Nallbani began working at the National Theatre of Opera and Ballet of Albania. She is one of the most successful in the music competition Festivali i Këngës, having won it three times. In 1989, she won for the first time together with Frederik Ndoci and Julia Ndoci. Three years later, in 1992, she won again, this time together with Aleksandër Gjoka and Viktor Tahiraj. Her third and most recent win came in 1993, when she won herself with the song "Kur e humba një dashuri".

In 2005, Nallbani competed in Festivali i Këngës 44 with "S'mjafton një jejë", but ended up unplaced in the final when only the top three were revealed. Two years later, she competed in Festivali i Këngës 46 with "Kjo botë merr bhëdi nga dashuria". She had written the lyrics for the song herself, with music by Klodian Qafoku. In the final, she received 27 points, with a maximum of an 8 (third highest) from judge Rudina Magjistari.

At the Festivali i Këngës 49, she herself sat on the jury that selected the winner who would represent Albania at the Eurovision Song Contest 2011.

In November 2013, Nallbani participated in the 15th edition of Kënga Magjike with the song "Vetëm unë" written and composed by Flori Mumajesi. In the final of the competition, she finished in fourth place with 633 points.

Nallbani took part in Festivali i Këngës 56 in December 2017 with the song "Istësto qiêl" written by Rozana Radi and Elgit Doda.

== Personal life ==
Nallbani is married to Sokol Tona and has two daughters.
