= Mentor Xhemali =

Albanian singer

Mentor Xhemali ([dʒɛmali]),(May 11, 1926 - July 11, 1992) was a notable Albanian singer. He was well known as a baritone all over the world. He was born in Përmet.

== Sources ==
- Lole, Dhimitraq (2003). Mentor Xhemali: (monografi) : nje ze dhe nje zemer bubullime (in Albanian). Mes̈onjeẗorja. ISBN 978-99927-55-38-9.
