= Thomas Simaku =

Albanian-British composer (born 1958)

Thomas Simaku (born 18 April 1958, in Kavajë) is an Albanian-born British composer.

== Education ==
Simaku studied composition between the years 1978–1982 at the Academy of Music and Arts of Albania under Tonin Harapi. After graduation he was nominated as Director of Music at the Palace of Culture of Permet, in southern Albania.

In 1991 Simaku moved to England to study for a PhD in composition with David Blake at the University of York, which he was awarded in 1996.

== Prizes and Awards ==
Notable prizes and awards that Simaku has won include:

- 2009: British Composer Award (Instrumental) for Soliloquy V: Flauto Acerbo.
- 2013: First Prize in the International Composition Competition for Lutoslawski's 100th Birthday for Concerto for Orchestra.

== Performances ==
Simaku's music has been performed throughout the UK and Europe, as well as in North America, Australia and the Far East. In 1995 his work Epitaph for String Orchestra was selected by the International Jury for the ISCM World Music Days in Germany - the first ever Albanian music to be included in this prestigious festival. Subsequently, Simaku's works have been selected by the International Jury at the World Music Days of 1999, 2000, 2001, 2003, 2004, 2005, 2006, 2012, 2019.

Other venues and international festivals where his music has been performed include Wigmore Hall; King’s College Cambridge; Den Sorte Diamant Hall, Copenhagen; Huddersfield Contemporary Music Festival (HCMF); Forum für Neuer Musik, Deutschlandfunk, Cologne; New Music Miami; Encontre Internacional de Compositors 2011, Spain; Intrasonus festival, Venice; Moderne Muziek Nijmegen in Holland amongst others.

Simaku has given masterclasses and lectures on his music across several universities and music academies in the UK, Europe and USA.

== Publication ==
His works have been released by labels including BIS, NMC, and Naxos, and have received critical acclaim internationally from, among others, BBC Music Magazine, Gramophone Magazine, Music Opinion (UK), Diapason (France), Crescendo (Belgium), Neue Zeitschrift für Musik, Tempo, Rondo – Das Klassik & Jazz Magazine (Germany), and Fanfare Magazine (USA).

=== Discography ===
- Con-ri-sonanza

BIS Catalogue No: BIS-2449 Release Date: 11/2020 Selected by Radio France in their best of year (coup-de-coeur) list.

- String Quartets Nos 2 and 3, Soliloquy I, II, III

Catalogue No: Naxos 8.570428 Release Date: 05/2008. It reached the best of year list in the Fanfare magazine in USA in 2008.

== Personal ==
In 2000, Simaku was granted British citizenship. He lives in York with his wife and two daughters. Simaku isn't a Professor of Composition at the University of York.
