= Parashqevi Simaku =

Albanian singer (born 1966)

- Born: 1 September 1966 (age 60); Kavajë, People's Socialist Republic of Albania
- Occupation: Singer
- Years active: 1982–present
- Spouse: Robert Nolfe (m. 1996; div. 2007)
- Children: 1
- Musical career
- Genres: Folk; Light
- Instruments: Vocals

Parashqevi Simaku (born 1 September 1966) is an Albanian singer who rose to prominence in the 1980s and became one of the most recognizable voices in Albanian popular music during the late communist period. She is best known for her performances at Festivali i Këngës, winning first prize in 1985 and 1988.

== Career ==
In 1985, at the 24th annual edition of the national song festival, she won first prize with "Në moshën e rinisë" ("In the Age of Youth"). She would repeat her success in 1988 with the song "E duam lumturinë" ("We Want Happiness"), composed by Pirro Çako. These performances brought her national recognition.

=== Students incident ===
An incident during one of Simaku's live performances, which included symbolic gestures such as burning papers and waving flashing lights from balconies, was documented by the state security apparatus Sigurimi in an internal report later declassified in May 2020. While authorities described the event as disorderly and naïve, it has since been interpreted by observers as reflecting the cultural influence of artists during the final years of the regime.

=== Move to the United States ===
In 2006, she signed a recording contract with Sony Music and BMG for the release of her Albanian-language album "Echoes from Iliria" (Jehonë nga Iliria), which she co-produced with Robert Nolfe. The album combined traditional Albanian musical elements with contemporary production techniques.

== Personal life ==
In subsequent years, Simaku largely withdrew from public life. In December 2024, she was reported to be experiencing homelessness in New York City after being identified in a news segment by WABC 7 News.

== Discography ==
=== Albums ===
Echoes from Iliria (2006)
No.	Title	Length
1.	"Pak më shumë"	06:01
2.	"Se-Sa"	04:26
3.	"Haxhirea"	04:25
4.	"Anës lumenjve"	06:10
5.	"Jug*Veri"	04:32
6.	"Ura Shijakut"	04:34
7.	"Djelli"	03:39
8.	"Pranvera do të vi"	04:01
9.	"Kur jam me ty"	05:05
10.	"Dashuria"	04:50
Total length:		46:23

=== Folk songs ===
Year	Song
—	"Kënga e Qamiles"
—	"Këndon kumrija"
—	"Fustanin që ta solla mbrëmë"
—	"Ky marak, maraku i shkretë"
—	"Doli goca në penxhere"
—	"Kur del goca në pazar"
—	"Po më rreh zemra"
—	"Çelin manushaqet"
—	"Këndo qyqe se po vjen behari"
—	"Këndon gjeli pika pika"
—	"Si lule zambaku"
—	"2 Këngë Popullore të Shqipërisë së Mesme"
—	"Potpuri Këngësh Popullore"
—	"Këngë Arbëreshe"

=== Light songs ===
Year	Song
1981	"Ç'lumturi na dha kjo jetë"
1982	"Kur të prisja ty"
1982	"Gëzuar shokë" (feat. Lindita Theodhori)
1983	"Gëzimi i shtepisë së re"
1983	"Gëzuar Vitin e Ri"
1984	"Ngrohtësi" (feat. Tonin Tërshana)
1985	"Në moshën e rinisë"
1986	"Një mëngjes"
1986	"Kur lulëzon bliri"
1986	"Flamujt e aksioneve"
1986	"Çdo gjë bashkë të dy e ndajmë"
1987	"Bashkëmoshatarëve"
1987	"Në sytë e tu"
1987	"Koha nuk na pret"
1988	"Më the të dua"
1988	"E duam lumturinë"
1988	"Gusht e prush"
1989	"Jetoj"
1989	"Nuk jam vetëm"
1990	"Sonetë për vete"
1990	"Lejla"
1990	"Dëgjoma këngën"
—	"Mes nesh është dashuria"
—	"Shoqja ime"
—	"Sytë e një vogëlushi"
—	"Buzë detit jemi rritur"

=== Festivali i Këngës ===
Year	Song	Result
1981	"Ç'lumturi na dha kjo jetë"	—
1982	"Kur të prisja ty"	—
1982	"Gëzuar shokë" (feat. Lindita Theodhori)	2nd
1983	"Gëzuar Vitin e Ri"	—
1984	"Ngrohtësi" (feat. Tonin Tërshana)	—
1985	"Në moshën e rinisë"	1st
1986	"Një mëngjes"	3rd
1987	"Koha nuk na pret"	—
1988	"E duam lumturinë"	1st
1989	"Jetoj"	3rd

=== Koncerti i Pranverës ===
Year	Song
1986	"Kur lulëzon bliri"
1986	"Flamujt e aksioneve"
1987	"Bashkëmoshatarëve"
1987	"Në sytë e tu"
1988	"Më the të dua"
1989	"Nuk jam vetëm"
1990	"Dëgjoma këngën"
