= Vaçe Zela =

Albanian singer and songwriter (1939–2014)

- Born: 7 April 1939; Lushnjë, Albanian Kingdom
- Died: 6 February 2014 (aged 74); Basel, Switzerland
- Occupations: Singer; songwriter
- Spouse: Pjetër Rodiqi
- Children: 1
- Awards: People's Artist Honor of the Nation
- Musical career
- Genres: Folk; chanson
- Instruments: Vocals; guitar
- Years active: 1962–2014

Vaçe Zela (Albanian pronunciation: [ˈvatʃɛ ˈzɛla]; 7 April 1939 – 6 February 2014) was an Albanian singer and songwriter. She was a leading figure in Albania's music industry and is considered one of the most influential musicians of the 20th century.

Born in Lushnjë and raised in Tirana within Communist Albania, she developed a great interest in music at an early age before embarking on a professional career as a musician in 1962. An eleven-time winner of Festivali i Këngës, she began building her reputation as a highly successful musician by winning the first edition, and went on to win another ten editions of Festivali i Kenges.

Zela is a recipient of significant awards and decorations. She was awarded the Merited Artist Order, People's Artist Order and Honor of Nation Order.

== Early life and education ==
Vaçe Zela was born on 7 April 1939 in the city of Lushnjë, then part of the Kingdom of Albania, into an Albanian family, as she herself said, in which music was "sitting cross-legged in everyone's soul".

The first to discover Zela's talents were her school teachers. She was not only talented in music, but also in painting and theater. Zela was only ten years old when she began to sing folk songs from the Myzeqe region. She would often casually sing in her city of Lushnje's parks, attracting the passersby. Soon she would participate in small concerts organized in the city, although her parents did not like much the idea that their daughter took such a path. Nevertheless, she went to Tirana to compete in order to study at the prestigious School of Arts, but was not accepted, and attended Qemal Stafa High School, where she began to learn the guitar.

== Career ==
=== First appearances ===
Zela was first appointed in the Army's Ensemble (Albanian: Ansambli i Ushtrisë), then in the State's Ensemble (Ansambli Shtetëror), and finally the Ensemble of Songs and Dances (Ansambli i Këngëve dhe Valleve).

=== Awards ===
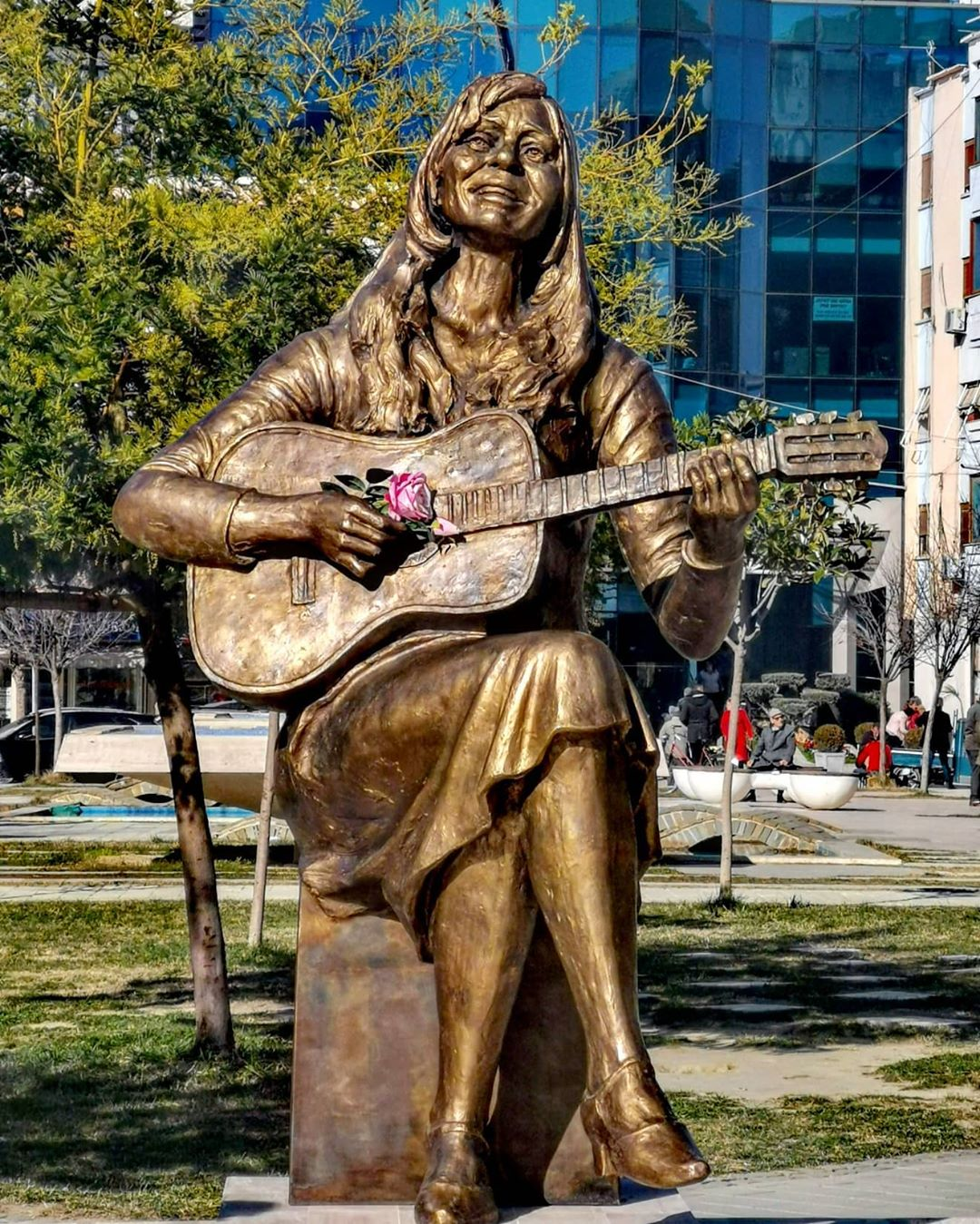
Statue of Vaçe Zela in her hometown

Zela was the first winner of Albanian music competition Festivali i Këngës with the song "Fëmija i parë" (English: First Child), on 26 December 1962. International awards include a "Golden Record", "Woman of the Year" in Cambridge, England for 1997–98, "Golden Microphone" from the Ministry of Culture of Kosovo, etc. The latest award was "Special Grand Prize for Singing Legend", the 45th anniversary of the Festival at ART, for the singer's unique contribution to Albanian music, and participation since the very first years of this festival, during which she received many awards.

== Sources ==
- Agolli, Nexhat (2001). Vaçe Zela: magjia e këngës shqiptare : monografi (in Albanian). Lisitan. ISBN 978-99927-739-1-8.
- Routledge (2007-01-01). International Who's Who in Popular Music 2007. Routledge. ISBN 978-1-85743-417-0.
