= Limoz Dizdari =

Albanian composer

Limoz Dizdari, Merited Artist of Albania, (born in 1942 in Delvinë) is an Albanian composer of classical music and music for movies.
