= Çesk Zadeja =

Albanian composer (1927–1997)

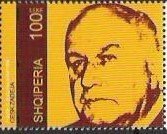
Zadeja on a 2007 Albanian postage stamp.

Çesk Zadeja (8 June 1927, Shkodër – 15 August 1997, Rome) was an Albanian composer. A native of Shkodër, he studied in Moscow and did much to promote the arts in Tirana. He is known as "The Father of Albanian Music".

He died in Rome, Italy on 15 August 1997.

== Discography ==
- Kenge, Albanian Piano Music, Vol. 1, Kirsten Johnson, piano, Guild GMCD 7257, which includes Zadeja's Four Pieces for Piano.
- Rapsodi, Albanian Piano Music, Vol. 2, Kirsten Johnson, piano, Guild GMCD 7300, which includes Zadeja's Theme and Variations in E minor and Toccata.
