= Nikolla Zoraqi =

Albanian composer

Nikolla Zoraqi (Aromanian: Nicolla Zorachi; 1929 – 1991) was a composer from Albania. His works included movie music and operas, notably Cuca e maleve (English: The Mountain Girl). Zoraqi was an ethnic Aromanian and had a wife called Gjenovefa Heba, also an Aromanian, with whom he had children.
