= National Theatre of Opera and Ballet of Albania =

Theater in Tirana, Albania

Coordinates: 41.3286°N 19.8192°E

- Official Emblem of the Venue

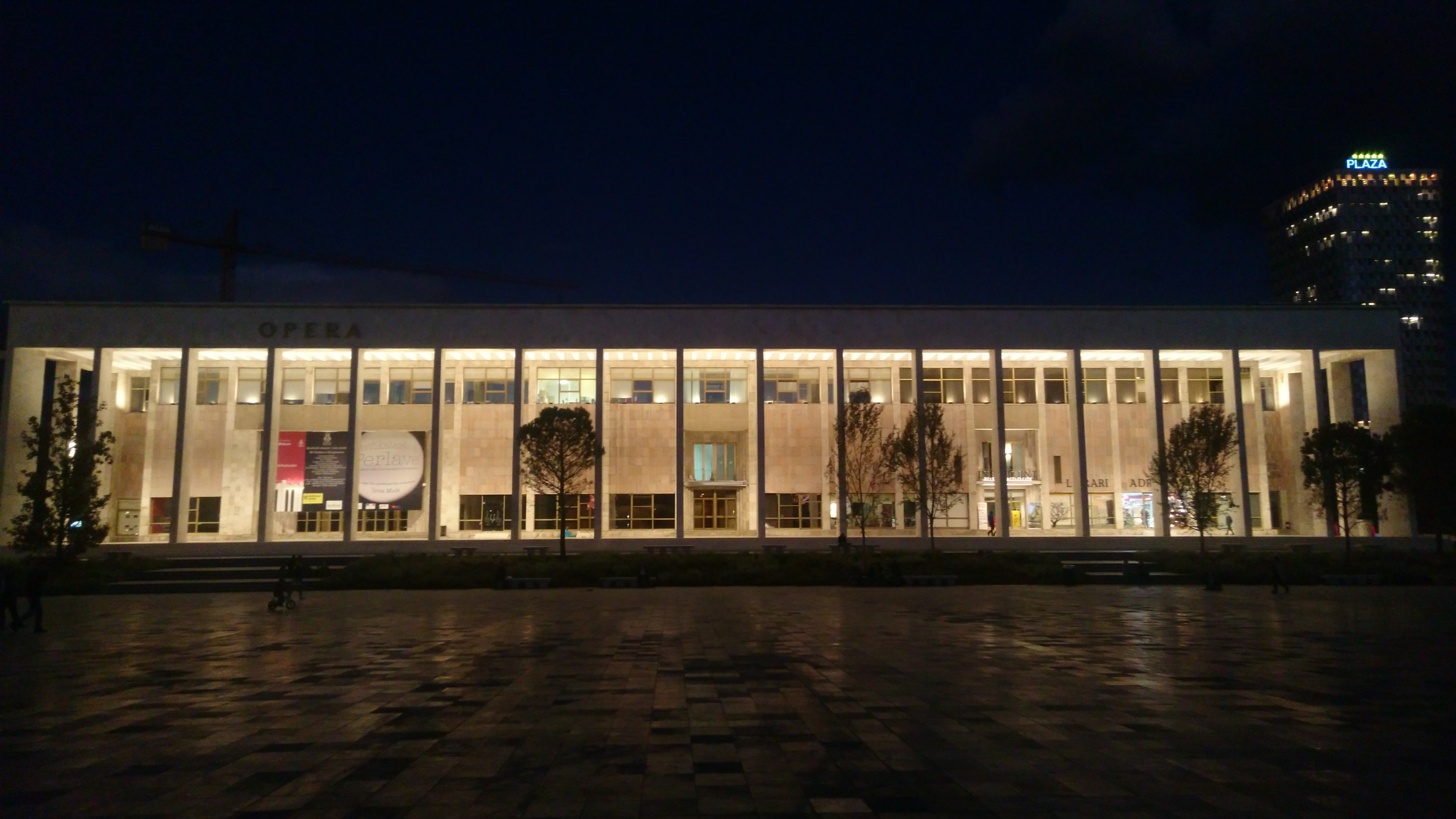
- View from the Skanderbeg Square
- Interactive map of National Theatre of Opera and Ballet of Albania
- Address: Palace of Culture / Skanderbeg Square 9, 1001 Tirana; Albania
- Capacity: about 200
- Current use: Opera and Ballet

Construction
- Opened: 1953

Website
- tkob.gov.al

The National Theatre of Opera and Ballet of Albania (Albanian: Teatri Kombëtar i Operas dhe Baletit - TKOB) is a theatre in Tirana, Albania. It is the largest theatre in the country and hosts music and dance performances year-round.

== History ==
The National Opera and Ballet Theatre was founded on 29 November 1953. It first operated within the building of the University of Arts of Albania and subsequently transferred into the Palace of Culture of Tirana building in central Tirana. The theatre helped develop the capital's arts scene since formerly there had been no venue for performances. Since the theatre's inception, groups and orchestras from various countries in the communist bloc came to give performances.

The national Song and Dance Ensemble often performs at the national theatre.

The Theatre reports to the Ministry of Culture, Youth, and Sports and is financed out of the state budget. Today, the Opera presents works by Albanian and international composers. Tickets can be purchased on-site. It employs 196 persons.

In 2016, the Prime Minister of Albania announced that the Theatre would be reconstructed.

== See also ==
- List of concert halls
- Academy of Music and Arts of Albania
- Palace of Culture of Tirana
- National Gallery of Figurative Arts of Albania
