= Tonin Harapi =

Albanian composer

Tonin Harapi (June 9, 1926 – July 30, 1992) was an Albanian composer and teacher. He was born in Shkodër, Albania. He studied composition in Moscow, USSR. He was professor of composition at the Conservatory of Tirana; and the winner of many prizes and titles.

== Discography ==
- Kenge, Albanian Piano Music, Vol. 1, Kirsten Johnson, piano, Guild GMCD 7257; includes Harapi's Romance in A-flat, Valle: andante con moto, Nji dhimb je e vogel (A Little Pain), Valle: allegro vivo, Romance in A minor, Moll 'e kuqe top sheqere (A Candied Apple), Waltz on a Popular Theme.
- Rapsodi, Albanian Piano Music, Vol. 2, Kirsten Johnson, piano, Guild GMCD 7300; includes Harapi's Sonatina, Kenge mbremje (Evening Song), and Theme and Variations.
