= List of Albanian musicians =

This is a list of Albanian musicians.

== Male singers ==
=== A ===
- Dren Abazi (born 1985)
- Vedat Ademi (born 1982)
- Kristaq Antoniu (1907–1979)
- Xhoni Athanas (1925–2019)
- Azet (born 1993)

=== B ===
- Bardhi (born 1997)
- Laver Bariu (1929–2014)
- Lindon Berisha (born 1990)
- Blerando (born 1999)
- Sin Boy (born 1994)
- Action Bronson (born 1983)
- Ardian Bujupi (born 1991)
- Eugent Bushpepa (born 1984)
- Buta (born 1995)

=== C ===
- Capital T (born 1992)
- Claydee (born 1985)

=== Ç ===
- Gaqo Çako (1935–2018)
- Pirro Çako (born 1965)

=== D ===
- Limoz Dizdari (born 1942)
- Shkëlzen Doli (born 1971)
- David Dreshaj (born 1999)
- Pjetër Dungu (1908–1989)

=== E ===
- Luiz Ejlli (born 1985)
- Elai (born 1999)

=== F ===
- Ermal Fejzullahu (born 1988)
- Fero (born 1997)
- Fifi (born 1994)
- Florat (born 1997)
- Dr. Flori (1979–2014)

=== G ===
- Adrian Gaxha (born 1984)
- Tahir Gjoci (born 1993)
- GASHI (born 1989)

=== Gj ===
- Gjon's Tears (born 1998)
- Ardit Gjebrea (born 1963)
- Tiri Gjoci (born 1993)
- Ingrid Gjoni (born 1981)
- Rosela Gjylbegu (born 1987)

=== H ===
- Anxhelina Hadërgjonaj (born 1992)
- Agim Hushi (born 1967)

=== I ===
- Yon Idy
- Butrint Imeri (born 1996)
- Era Istrefi (born 1994)

=== J ===
- Prenkë Jakova (1917–1969)

=== K ===
- Taip Kadiu (1928–2013)
- Shpat Kasapi (1985–2025)
- Kidda (born 1997)
- Killua
- Ramiz Kovaçi (1929–1994)
- Agim Krajka (1937–2021)
- MC Kresha (born 1984)

=== L ===
- Yll Limani (born 1994)
- Adrian Lulgjuraj (born 1980)
- Lyrical Son (born 1984)

=== M ===
- Majk (born 1990)
- Ermal Mamaqi (born 1982)
- Ermal Meta (born 1981)
- Mozzik (born 1995)
- Neço Muko (1899–1934)
- Avni Mula (1928–2020)
- Flori Mumajesi (born 1982)

=== N ===
- Frederik Ndoci (born 1960)
- Noizy (born 1986)
- Nikollë Nikprelaj (born 1961)

=== P ===
- Kristaq Paspali (1928–2001)
- Aleksandër Peçi (born 1951)
- Ismet Peja (1937–2020)
- Salih Uglla Peshteri (1849–1945)
- Enver Petrovci (born 1954)
- Saimir Pirgu (born 1981)

=== Q ===
- Muharrem Qena (1930–2006)

=== R ===
- Alban Ramosaj (born 1996)

=== S ===
- Bledar Sejko (born 1971)
- Getoar Selimi (born 1982)
- Alban Skënderaj (born 1982)
- Lyrical Son (born 1984)
- Albert Stanaj (born 1994)

=== T ===
- Toquel (born 1994)
- David Tukiçi (born 1956)
- Ibrahim Tukiqi (1926–2004)

=== U ===
- Unikkatil (born 1981)

=== V ===
- Vinz (born 1992)
- Demir Vlonjati (1780–1845)
- Ledri Vula (born 1986)

=== X ===
- Mentor Xhemali (1926–1992)
- Don Xhoni (born 2000)

=== Z ===
- Young Zerka (born 1992)
- Kastro Zizo (born 1984)
- Nikolla Zoraqi (1928–1991)

== Female singers ==
=== A ===
- Arilena Ara (born 1998)
- Melinda Ademi (born 1995)

=== B ===
- Arta Bajrami (born 1980)
- Rina Balaj (born 1999)
- Aida Baraku (born 1967)
- Besa (born 1989)
- Anita Bitri (1968–2004)
- Bleona (born 1979)
- Olta Boka (born 1991)

=== C ===
- Miriam Cani (born 1985)

=== Ç ===
- Ledina Çelo (born 1977)
- Isea Çili (born 2007)
- Çiljeta (born 1985)

=== D ===
- Elhaida Dani (born 1993)
- Dafina Zeqiri (born 1989)
- Ergi Dini (1994–2016)
- Dhurata Dora (born 1992)
- Afërdita Dreshaj (born 1986)
- Elina Duni (born 1981)

=== E ===
- Enca (born 1995)
- Era Istrefi (born 1994)
- Kristine Elezaj (born 1986)
- Elia, Princess of Albania (born 1983)

=== F ===
- Fifi (born 1994)
- Eli Fara (born 1967)
- Eleni Foureira (born 1987)

=== G ===
- Aurela Gaçe (born 1974)
- Ana Golja (born 1996)
- Flaka Goranci (born 1985)

=== Gj ===
- Elvana Gjata (born 1987)
- Ingrid Gjoni (born 1981)
- Rosela Gjylbegu (born 1987)

=== H ===
- Anxhelina Hadërgjonaj (born 1993)
- Ronela Hajati (born 1989)
- Lindita Halimi (born 1989)
- Enca Haxhia (born 1995)
- Alida Hisku (born 1957)

=== I ===
- Ilira (born 1994)
- Adelina Ismajli (born 1979)
- Genta Ismajli (born 1984)
- Era Istrefi (born 1994)
- Nora Istrefi (born 1986)

=== J ===
- Leonora Jakupi (born 1979)
- Ermonela Jaho (born 1974)

=== K ===
- Kanita (born 2001)
- Samanta Karavella (born 1990)
- Albina Kelmendi (born 1998)
- Kida (born 1997)
- Eni Koçi (born 1996)
- Tefta Tashko-Koço (1910–1947)
- Liljana Kondakçi (born 1950)
- Vanessa Krasniqi (born 1994)
- Flaka Krelani (born 1988)
- Marie Kraja (1911–1999)
- Yllka Kuqi (born 1982)

=== L ===
- Irma Libohova (born 1959)
- Elsa Lila (born 1981)
- Lindita (born 1989)
- Dua Lipa (born 1995)
- Marie Logoreci (1920–1988)
- Vesa Luma (born 1986)
- Venera Lumani (born 1991)

=== M ===
- Soni Malaj (born 1981)
- Jonida Maliqi (born 1983)
- Gonxhe Manakovska (born 1921)
- Oriola Marashi (born 1996)
- Hersi Matmuja (born 1991)
- Ava Max (born 1994)
- Luçie Miloti (1930–2006)
- Inva Mula (born 1963)
- Xhensila Myrtezaj (born 1993)

=== N ===
- Enisa Nikaj (born 1996)
- Laura Nezha (born 1990)
- Inis Neziri (born 2001)
- Pavlina Nikaj (1931–2011)
- Njomza (born 1994)
- Rona Nishliu (born 1986)

=== O ===
- Rita Ora (born 1990)
- Anna Oxa (born 1961)

=== P ===
- Nexhmije Pagarusha (1933–2020)
- Juliana Pasha (born 1980)
- Anxhela Peristeri (born 1986)

=== Q ===
- Bleona Qereti (born 1979)

=== R ===
- Rozana Radi (born 1979)
- Bebe Rexha (born 1989)
- Fitnete Rexha (1933–2003)

=== S ===
- Parashqevi Simaku (born 1966)
- Rezarta Smaja (born 1984)
- Fatime Sokoli (1948–1987)
- Rovena Stefa (born 1979)
- Kanita Suma (born 2001)

=== Sh ===
- Anjeza Shahini (born 1987)

=== T ===
- Eneda Tarifa (born 1982)
- Tefta Tashko (1910–1947)
- Tayna (born 1996)
- Kejsi Tola (born 1992)
- Mirjam Tola (born 1972)
- Tuna (born 1985)
- Jorgjia Filçe-Truja (1907–1994)

=== Th ===
- Adelina Thaçi (born 1980)

=== V ===
- Alketa Vejsiu (born 1984)
- Luana Vjollca (born 1991)

=== Z ===
- Loredana Zefi (born 1995)
- Vaçe Zela (1939–2014)
- Dafina Zeqiri (born 1989)

== Musical groups ==
- Adrian Lulgjuraj
- Blla Blla Blla
- Elita 5
- Eugent Bushpepa
- Flaka Krelani
- Gjurmët
- Shkodra Elektronike
- SYTË
- Troja
- Venera Lumani
