= Kënga Magjike 2006 =

Dates
- Final: 19 November

Host
- Venue: Palace of Congresses, Tirana, Albania
- Presenter(s): Ardit Gjebrea

Participants
- Number of entries: 53 songs

Vote
- Voting system: Singers voted for each other; 1-8; 10 & 12 points
- Winning song: Armend Rexhepagiqi

Kënga Magjike 08 was the eighth edition of the annual Albanian song competition, first held in 1999. It took place in the Palace of Congresses in Tirana, Albania. There were two semifinals (17 and 18 November 2006) and a final (19 November 2006). Fifty-three songs were heard in advance by the public at home, which narrowed them down to 39 songs by televoting. These songs competed in the semi-finals but only 19 made it to the final. In the end, Armend Rexhepagiqi won the first prize. Ledina Çelo was the runner-up. The winner was determined by the singers who voted for each other.

== The results ==
Rank	Artist	Song	Points
1	Armend Rexhepagiqi	Me Kilometra	293
2	Ledina Çelo	Jemi Të Huaj	292
3	West Side Family	Krahët E Tua Do Jem	218
4	Eneida Tarifa	Rreth Zjarrit Tënd	154
5	Ermal Fejzullahu	Goca Nga Tirana	139
6	NRG Band	Luja Bab Luja	130
7	Produkt 28 & Rovena Dilo	Fama	126
8	Yllka Kuqi	Më Merr	95
9	Rona Nishliu	Shenja	90
10	Orinda Huta	Nisu, Arratisu	75
11	Kaltrina Sellimi	Do Të Them Po	72
12	Teuta Kurti	Jeto Me Bugin	56
13	Çiljeta	S'ke Ku Vete	44
14	Burn	Qëndro Pranë	41
15	Hip Hop Soldiers	Jump	41
16	Ani Cuedari	Mësuar Me Ty	40
17	Besa Kokëdhima	Tani Të Dua	38
18	Gressa	Kupto Djalë	37
19	Berkan	Një Në Një Milion	36
20	Big Basta & DJ Vini (Ervin Xhixho)	Ndize	32
21	Aurel Thëllimi	Jam Vetëm	26
22	Alb Magji	Ti Më Kall	25
23	Rikthimi, Big Man & Blerina	Albanians In The Club	24
24	Rezarta Shkurta	DJ	24
25	L.R.C & Master Bas	Extazy	23
26	Mili	Loja Mbaroi	22
27	Bertan Asllani	Më Fal	22
28	Ronela Hajati & Orgesa Zaimi	Requiem	21
29	Kastro Zizo, Besmir Metani & Sanches	Party	18
30	Seldi	Unë Dhe Ti	18
31	Gentian Gojani	Ty Magjike	9
32	Emi Bogdo & Floriana Muça	Ndryshe	9
33	Erinda Dhima	Flakë	7
34	Gilan G, B2N & 25%	Me Eks	7
35	Gerta Heta	Shumë Sexy	6
36	Denis Hasa	Natë Perfekte	6
37	Emira Ademi	Më Pëlqen Parfumi Yt I Ri	3
38	Eri	Sexy Baby	1
39	Ermiona Lekbello	Nuk Do Më Kesh Më Pranë	0

== Not in the semi-finals ==
Rank	Artist	Song	Points
N/A	Albulena Brestovci	Më Do Mua	?
N/A	APG & Fabiani	Hej, Kamariere	?
N/A	Besiana Kertusha	Dhe Mbetet Një Imazh	?
N/A	Denada Bare	Të Ndjej Baby	?
N/A	Erika	S'e Di	?
N/A	Evans Rama	U Ktheva	?
N/A	Gentian Dema	Ti Je Larg	?
N/A	Guximtar Rushani	Vjeshta E Fundit	?
N/A	Jani & Meda	Vetëm Një Herë	?
N/A	Jeta Faqolli	Shikimet	?
N/A	Jeta Mehmeti	I Mbaruar	?
N/A	Lindita Selimi	E Di Çfarë Zemre Ke	?
N/A	Roy	Femër E Nxehtë	?
N/A	Saranda Jusufi	As Të Ndarë, As Të Bashkuar	?

== Voting procedure ==
The singers voted for each other to determine the ranking of the songs, the jury determined most of the other prizes, while the televote decided the "Public's Prize" and the "Internet Prize".

=== The jury ===
- Lindita Theodhori
- Monika Kryemadhi
- Xheraldina Vula
- Gentiana Ismajli
- Jean Philippe Favreau
- Riza Cerova
- Alfred Kaçinari
- Arian Cani
- Pandi Laço
- Geri Selenica
- Ilir Bibolli

== Other prizes ==
#	Prize	Translation	Artist	Song
1	Çmimi I Interpretimit	Best Interpretation	Ledina Çelo	Jemi Të Huaj
2	Çmimi I Kritikës	Critic's Prize	Armend Rexhepagiqi	Kur Dashuria Vdes
3	Kantautori Më I Mirë	Best Songwriter	West Side Family	Në Krahët E Tua Do Jem
4	Çmimi I Publikut	Public's Prize	Ermal Fejzullahu	Goca Nga Tirana
5	Çmimi I Internetit	Internet Prize	Ermal Fejzullahu	Goca Nga Tirana
6	Best Hip-Hop	Best Hip-Hop	Rovena Dilo & Produkt 28	Fama
7	Magjia E Parë	First Magic	Berkan	Një Në Një Milion
8	RTV 21	RTV 21	Kaltrina Selimi	Do Të Them Po
9	Best Group	Best Group	Burn	Qëndro Pranë
10	Çmimi Diskografik	Discography Prize	Orinda Huta	Nisu, Arratisu
11	Tendence	Tendence	Ronela Hajati & Orgesa Zaimi	Requiem
12	Etno-Muzikë	Ethno Music	Çiljeta	S'ke Ku Vete
13	Kënga Stil	Style Song	Teuta Kurti	Jeto Me Bugin
14	Melodi	Best Melody	Yllka Kuqi	Më Merr
15	Best Dance	Best Dance	Besa Kokëdhima	Tani Të Dua
16	Jon Production	Jon Production	Erinda Dhima	Flakë
17	Best Feat	Best Feat	Kastro Zizo, Besmir Metani & Sanches	Party
18	Çesk Zadeja	Çesk Zadeja	Eneida Tarifa	Rreth Zjarrit Tënd
19	TV Klan	TV Klan	Rona Nishliu	Shenja
20	Kënga Hit	Hit Song	NRG Band	Luja Bab Luja

== Orchestra ==
Playback was used.

== Guest artists ==
- Lindita Theodhori
- Saimir Pirgu
- Elena Risteska

== Staff ==
- Executive Producer: Anila Gjebrea
- Stage: Bashkim Zahaj
- Organizer: Ardit Gjebrea
- Directors: Agron Vulaj; Astrit Idrizi
