= Kënga Magjike 2005 =

Date and venue
- Final: 13 November
- Venue: Palace of Congresses, Tirana, Albania

Organisation
- Presenters: Ardit Gjebrea & Denada Dajlani

Participants
- Number of entries: 31 songs

Vote
- Winning song: Gentiana Ismajli

Kënga Magjike 07 was the seventh edition of the Albanian music contest Kënga Magjike and took place in the Palace of Congresses in Tirana. There were two semi-finals (11 & 12 November 2005) and a final (13 November 2005). 31 songs competed for the win but only 14 made it to the final. In the end, Gentiana Ismajli won the first prize. Grupi Aurora was the runner-up. The winner was determined by the singers who voted for each other.

== Results ==
Rank	Artist	Song	Points
1	Gentiana Ismajli	Nuk Dua Tjetër	292
2	Grupi Aurora	Lele Kaçurrele	269
3	Flori Mumajesi	Me Sy Mbyllur	221
N/A	Bleona Qereti	S'dua	?
N/A	Blero	Më Mungon	?
N/A	Burim Hoxha	Pak Unë E Pakëz Ti	?
N/A	Jonida Maliqi	Papagalli I Dashurisë	?
N/A	Juliana Pasha	Ti, Unë	?
N/A	Julka	Kurrë Mos Thuaj Jo	?
N/A	Mirsa Kërcelli	Djaloshi Im	?
N/A	Orinda Huta	Harrova Të Marr Frymë	?
N/A	Shpat Kasapi	Pranë Buzëve Të Tua	?
N/A	Soni Malaj	Zjarr	?
N/A	Tuna	Testamenti	?

== Non-finalists ==
Rank	Artist	Song	Points
N/A	Afërdita Bajrami	S'paske Qënë Naiv	?
N/A	Alb Magji	Videl	?
N/A	Anxhela Peristeri & Big Man	Sonte Dridhuni	?
N/A	Besmir Metani	Engjëll A Djall	?
N/A	Brikena Beqiri	Mallkim	?
N/A	Denada Bare	Me Frymën Tënde	?
N/A	Egla Shkurti	Sa Premtime	?
N/A	Elvana Gjata	Të Kam Xhan	?
N/A	Emi & Xhina	Lëre Natën Pas	?
N/A	Erio Qerfozi	Netët E Gjata	?
N/A	Esad Ademi	Nuk Mund Të Rezistosh	?
N/A	Greta Koçi	Kam Mall	?
N/A	Jola	Ti Je	?
N/A	Monika & Kristela	Ne Të Dyja	?
N/A	Step by Step	My Party	?
N/A	Syri I Shqiponjës	Çika	?
N/A	X-WNC	Të Cilla	?

== Voting procedure ==
The singers voted for each other to determine the ranking of the songs.

Jury decided the following prizes:

- Çmimi I Kritikës (Critic's Prize)
- Interpretimi Më I Mirë (Best Interpretation)
- Çesk Zadeja (Çesk Zadeja)
- Magjia E Parë (First Magic)

Televote decided the following prizes:

- Kënga Hit (Hit Song)
- Çmimi I Internetit (Internet Prize)
- Çmimi I Publikut (Public's Prize)

=== Jury ===
- President Of The Jury: Robert Radoja
- Florin Klemendi
- Opera Singer: Edit Mihali
- Songwriter: Zhuliana Jorganxhi
- Singer: Zana Çela
- Enkel Demi
- Singer: Irma Libohova
- Singer, Composer, Songwriter: Pirro Çako
- Songwriter: Floran Kondi (Dr. Flori)

== Other prizes ==
#	Prize	Translation	Artist	Song
1	Çmimi I Kritikës	Critic's Prize	Tuna	Testamenti
2	Interpretimi Më I Mirë	Best Interpretation	Jonida Maliqi	Papagalli I Dashurisë
3	Magjia E Parë	First Magic	Mirsa Kërcelli	Djaloshi Im
4	Çesk Zadeja	Çesk Zadeja	Juliana Pasha	Ti, Unë
5	Çmimi I Internetit	Internet Prize	Gentiana Ismajli	Nuk Dua Tjetër
6	Kënga Hit	Hit Song	Grupi Aurora	Lele Kaçurrele
7	Çmimi I Publikut	Public's Prize	Shpat Kasapi	Pranë Buzëve Të Tua
8	Paraqitja Skenike	Stage Presence	Orinda Huta	Harrova Të Marr Frymë
9	Çmimi Produksion	Production Prize	Tuna	Testamenti
10	Çmimi Diskografik	Discography Prize	Blero	Më Mungon
11	Millennium	Millennium	Soni Malaj	Zjarr
12	Melodi	Best Melody	Burim Hoxha	Pak Unë E Pakëz Ti
13	Çmimi Televiziv	Television Prize	Bleona Qereti	S'dua
14	Kantautori Më I Mirë	Best Songwriter	Florjan Mujamesi	Me Sy Mbyllur
15	Best Dance	Best Dance	Julka	Kurrë Mos Thuaj Jo

== Orchestra ==
Playback was used.

== Guest artists ==
- Yllka Mujo

=== Politicians ===
- Majlinda Bregu
- Monika Kryemadhi

Sang a version of Ardit Gjebrea's song "Dimëroj".

=== Others ===
- Refik Halili

Donated a car to jury president Robert Radoja.

== Staff ==
- Organizer: Ardit Gjebrea
- Directors: Agron Vulaj & Astrit Idrizi

== Sources ==
- KM Official Website: http://www.kengamagjike.com
- Related info: Revista Albaniac
- Download all Songs: Shkarko Kenga Magjike 2007 ne Mp3 Falas
