= Kënga Magjike 2004 =

Date and venue
- Final: 23 January
- Venue: 1 Tetori Auditorium, Pristina, Kosovo

Organisation
- Presenters: Ardit Gjebrea

Participants
- Number of entries: 30 songs

Vote
- Voting system: Singers voted for each other
- Winning song: Irma Libohova

Kënga Magjike 06 took place in the 1 Tetori Auditorium in Pristina, Kosovo.There were two semifinals (21 and 22 January 2005) and a final (23 January 2005). 30 songs competed for the win but only one won the show, while others were awarded different prizes. In the end, Irma Libohova won the first prize, making this her second victory. Yllka Kuqi was the runner-up. The winner was determined by the singers who voted for each other.

== Results ==
| Rank | Artist | Song | Points |
|---|---|---|---|
| 1 | Irma Libohova | "Prapë Tek Ti Do Të Vij" | ? |
| 2 | Yllka Kuqi | "Dhe Të Dua" | ? |
| 3 | Pirro Çako | "Letër Dashurie" | ? |

== Voting procedure ==
The singers voted for each other to determine the ranking of the songs, while the jury decided most of the other prizes. Televoting was used for the "Public's Prize".

=== Jury ===
- President of the jury, singer: Nexhmije Pagarusha
- Singer, songwriter: Aleksandër Gjoka
- Singer, composer: Valton Beqiri
- Violinist: Ibrahim Madhi
- Beauty pageant, host, producer: Valbona Selimllari
- General director of TV Klan: Aleksandër Frangaj

== Other prizes ==
| # | Prize | Translation | Artist | Song |
|---|---|---|---|---|
| 1 | Çmimi I Kritikës | Critic's Prize | Irma Libohova | Prapë Tek Ti Do Të Vij |
| 2 | Vokali Më I Mirë | Best Vocal | Yllka Kuqi | Dhe Të Dua |
| 3 | Çesk Zadeja | Çesk Zadeja | Pirro Çako | Letër Dashurie |
| 4 | Çmimi Televiziv | Television Prize | Mimoza Mustafa | Robnesha |
| 5 | Paraqitja Skenike | Stage Presence | Adrian Gaxha | Ku Je Xhan |
| 6 | Kantautori Më I Mirë | Best Songwriter | Redon Makashi | Natë E Fundit |
| 7 | Etno-Muzikë | Ethno Music | Jonida Maliqi | Nuk Kam Faj Që Robëroj |
| 8 | Magjia E Parë | First Magic | Burim Hoxha | Lozonjarja |
| 9 | Çmimi Diskografik | Discography Prize | Alketa Vejsiu | Po S'më Puthe Ti |
| 10 | Çmimi I Interpretimit | Best Interpretation | Flori Mumajesi | Gjithmonë Do Jem Me Ty |
| 11 | Çmimi I Publikut | Public's Prize | Ledina Çelo | Një Ishull Që Nuk Ekziston |
| 12 | Kënga Hit | Hit Song | Shpat Kasapi | Shuje |
| 13 | Çmimi Produksion | Production Prize | Edona Llalloshi | Ika Nga Ti |

== Orchestra ==
Playback was used.

== Guest artists ==
- Merita Halili
- Samantha Fox
- Rednex
- Ai-kut
- Albi Nako & Dance Crew
- Xeni
- Orinda Huta

== Staff ==
- Organizer: Ardit Gjebrea
- Director: Vera Grabocka
