= Silva Gunbardhi =

Albanian singer

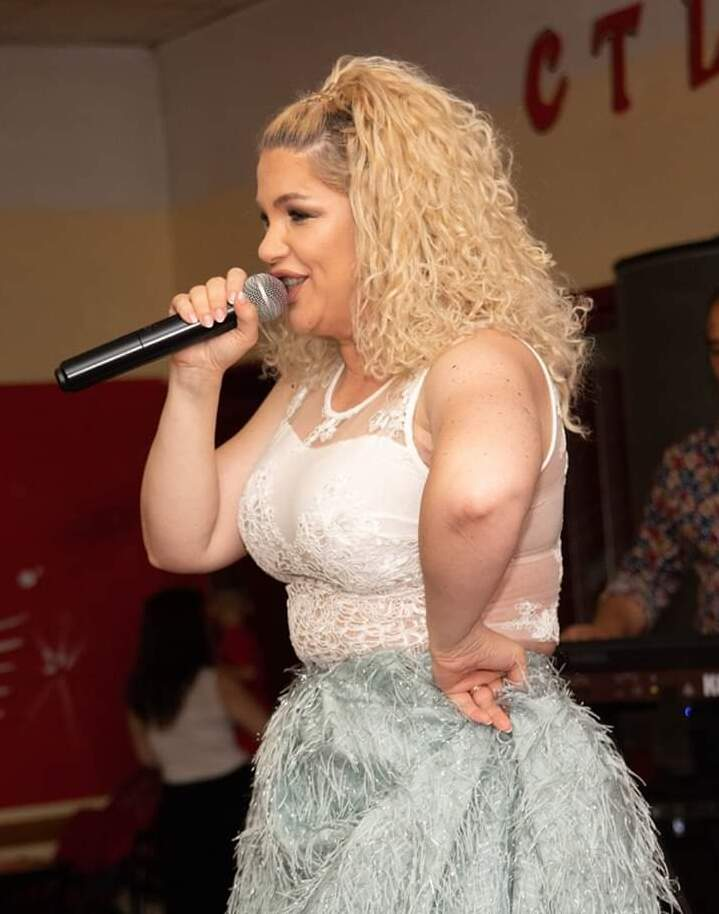

Background information
- Born: 2 November 1981 (age 44); Vlorë, Albania
- Genres: Pop-folk
- Occupation: Singer
- Spouse: Dafi Derti

Silva Gunbardhi is an Albanian singer. After participating in several festivals, including in two editions of the Festivali i Këngës, she attained global popularity with her 2013 song "Të ka lali shpirt".

== Biography ==
Gunbardhi was raised in Vlorë and originally worked at the local Petro Marko Theatre, an experience that started her singing career. Her family moved to Tirana after her father died.

Gunbardhi appeared in several music festivals and performed folk songs. In 2001, she participated in the Festivali i Këngës; although she did not win, Flori Slatina cited Gunbardhi's music as one of the "wonderful creations" of that edition. In 2006, she performed "Dua të jem" at the Festivali i Këngës 45 but was eliminated at the semi-final round. She participated in Kënga Magjike 2009, performing alongside Kelly.

In 2013, Gunbardhi released "Të ka lali shpirt", a pop-folk song she worked on with Mandi Nishtulla and Dafi Derti. Shqiptarja called it one of her most successful songs. In May 2015, it reached 100 million views, the first Albanian-language song to reach that milestone. In 2019, it reached 500 million views. The song also attained popularity outside of Albania, including in the Balkan regions, and Telegrafi reported that Gunbardhi "is very popular and already has many fans everywhere". Eventually, her record with "Të ka lali shpirt" was surpassed by Era Istrefi's song "BonBon".

In March 2017, Gunbardhi released another song "Lalushe", which she work on with singer Defri Dervishi. Her 2019 song "Baba" was dedicated to her father. In July 2021, she and her long-time collaborator Derti returned to music with their new song "Sa tkam prit". Other songs she performed include "Marak" and "Tequila".

Despite the widespread popularity of "Te ka lali shpirt", Gunbardhi still struggled financially, which she said was because she had less time for work due to her studies and providing childcare for her son. In 2018, Telegrafi reported that she was working as a waitress at a bar; Telegrafi said at the time that she "continues to be the occasional topic of the Albanian gossip media" despite her retirement from the music industry. In January 2022, she appeared on the E Diela Shqiptare segment Shihemi në gjyq to solve her dispute with Mandi over royalties for their song; the segment ended with presenter Eni Çobani announcing that the dispute would be solved privately.

Gunbardhi is married to Dafi Derti, whom she met while making "Të ka lali shpirt". Their son was born in 2015. In February 2017, she underwent surgery to correct eye pain which she said lasted a decade; she said that she had delayed this for a long time due to her financial issues.
