= Nezha (disambiguation) =

Nezha is a protection deity in Chinese folk religion.

Nezha or Ne Zha may also refer to:

- Calmodulin-regulated spectrin-associated protein 3, also sometimes known as Nezha
- Nezha (given name), a feminine given name of Arabic origin, meaning virtuousness or a promenade
- Laura Nezha (born 1990), Albanian singer, actress, and director
- Neta (car marque), also called Nezha, an automotive brand of Hozon Auto

== Film ==
- Nezha (2014 film), a Chinese period drama film
- I Am Nezha (2016 film), a Chinese animated fantasy film
- Ne Zha (2019 film), a Chinese animated fantasy film
- New Gods: Nezha Reborn (2021 film), a Chinese animated fantasy film
- Ne Zha 2, a 2025 Chinese animated fantasy film and the sequel to the 2019 film

== See also ==
- Nataku (disambiguation), Nezha in Japanese
- Nalakuvara, a yaksha in Indian mythology, the etymon and basis for Nezha
