= Sánchez (disambiguation) =

Sánchez may refer to:

- Sánchez (surname)
- Sánchez, Dominican Republic, municipality in Samaná Province, Dominican Republic
- Sanchez Reservoir, in Colorado, United States

== See also ==
- Dirty Sanchez (disambiguation)
- Sanches
