= Flaka =

Flaka is a feminine given name. It may refer to:

- Flaka Asllanaj, 21st century Kosovan footballer
- Flaka Goranci (born 1985), Kosovo-Albanian opera singer
- Flaka Krelani (born 1989), Kosovo-Albanian singer
- Flaka Surroi (born 1964), Kosovo-Albanian publisher
