= Kângë majekrahi =

Albanian monophonic male singing or chanting

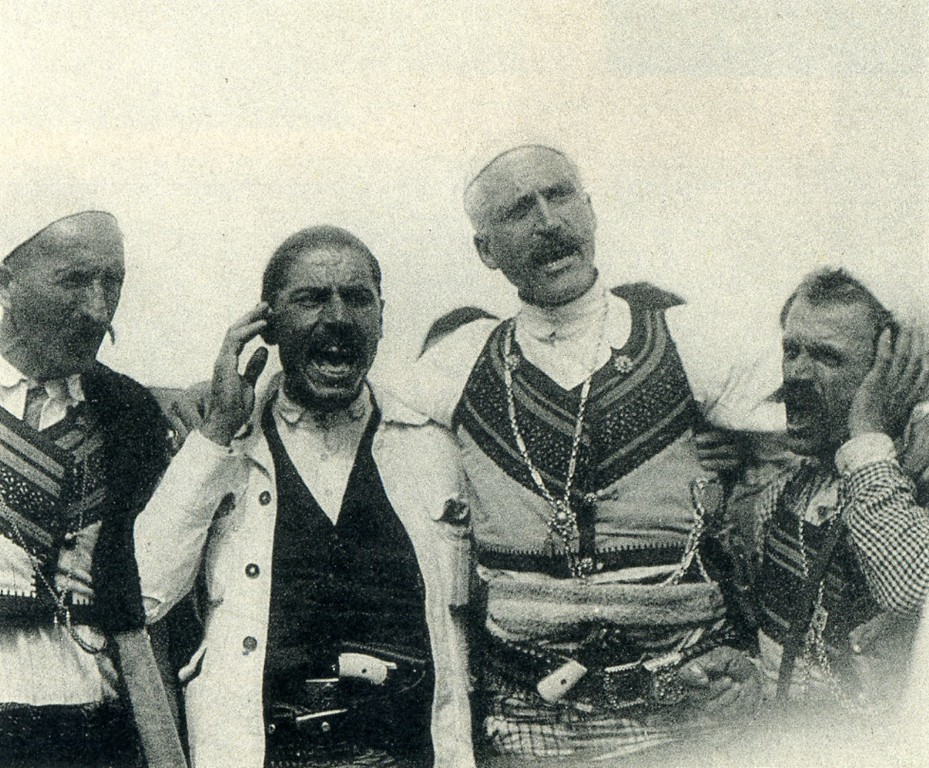
Northern Albanian tribesman performing kângë majekrahi in 1929.

Kângë majekrahi (or Standard Albanian: këngë majëkrahut; English: "majekrahi songs", "songs over the arm") alternatively kângë malësorçe (or këngë malësorçe; "mountain songs" or "highland songs") is a type of "call to action" monophonic male singing or chanting originating from the Northern Albanian mountains among the Albanian Gheg population.

== History ==
This type of singing is already documented in the region about 2000 years ago, being first heard by the Romans when they entered Shkodra in Illyria. The type of war cries were also common in the time of Skanderbeg. Swedish traditional herding-cries known as locklåtar or 'valley music' are probably close related to the Albanian mountain cries, although they have not the wild force of the kengë malsorqe, which go back right at the beginnings of melody. This type of mountain singing was acceptable among sworn virgins in Albania.

== Description ==
The singing is carried out with a high pitched cry or shriek usually standing on top of a mountain to communicate a message, such as the death of a family members, to warn other tribes of enemies entering the valley, or to carry news of a forthcoming wedding party. The Rugova highlanders have a tradition of epic verse singing involving a loud cry before leaving for war.

There are several types of songs depending on origin, such as songs with one's finger to close to the ear (këngë me gisht në vesh), songs with a raised arm (këngë majekrahu), war-cry songs (këngë kushtrimi), and wedding guest songs (këngët e krushqve). This type of singing was passed down from one generation to another (Alb. brez pas brezi) and were common among chanting shepherds. Highland songs are sung loudly with a free rhythm, ornaments, interjections and exclamations and other interpretative phenomena. The style has melismatic nuances and falsetto cries.

== Examples ==
The following is a translation of the "call to action" song "The Eagle Pledged Its Word":

"The eagle pledged its word,
Our land we won’t sell,
High stand our ideals,
Our land, may you live as long as the mountains!"

== See also ==
- Albanian singers
- Albanians
- Culture of Albania
- Music of Kosovo
- List of Albanian musicians
