= Nezihe =

Nezihe is a Turkish given name for females. It is also used as a surname. People named Nezihe include:

== Given name ==
- Nezihe Araz (1920–2009), Turkish writer and journalist
- Nezihe Bilgütay Derler (born 1926), Turkish miniaturist, Çini professional
- Nezihe Kalkan (born 1979), Turkish dancer and singer
- Nezihe Muhiddin (1889–1958), Ottoman Turkish women activist
- Nezihe Özdil (1911–1984), Turkish rower
- Nezihe Viranyalı (1925–2004), Turkish female aviator

== Surname ==
- Yaşar Nezihe (1882–1971), Ottoman Turkish poet

== See also ==
- Nezha (given name)
