= Ismajli =

Ismajli is an Albanian Kosovar surname that may refer to the following notable people:

- Adelina Ismajli (born 1979), Albanian Kosovar singer, actress, and beauty pageant
- Ardian Ismajli (born 1996), Albanian Kosovar football defender
- Genta Ismajli (born 1984), Albanian Kosovar singer-songwriter and actress
