= Vedat Ademi =

Kosovar singer-songwriter

- Born: 22 August 1982 (age 43)
- Origin: Titova Mitrovica, SFR Yugoslavia
- Genres: Pop rock
- Occupation: Singer
- Instruments: Vocals
- Years active: 2007–present
- Label: Threedots Albania

Vedat Ademi (born 22 August 1982) is a Kosovan singer-songwriter. He made his début in 2007 with "Më mashtruan sytë" at the 4th edition of Top Fest. However, he made the national breakthrough in 2011, after releasing his album Koha s'kthehet (Time doesn't return). His most successful song remains "Për ty", released in 2012.

== Biography ==
Ademi was born on 22 August 1982 in Mitrovica. In 2007 he entered Top Fest, and Kënga Magjike later with "Mall që djeg". The following year he participated in Top Fest again with "Mund të ishim bashkë" and entered the finals. He participated in these festivals numerous times. He rose to fame in 2011, being active in the Albanian-speaking music industry. He released "Emrin tim", "Për ty", "Një jetë me ty" which became instant hits. He later announced a duet with Albanian Kosovar singer Kuqi, whom he released "Në zemër të mbajë", also a big success.

Ademi married his fiancée in 2008 and became a father to a boy in 2012. He lived in Tirana, Albania since his son was born. In 2016, Vedat, his wife, and his son moved to Brooklyn, New York City, New York.

== Discography ==
=== Albums ===
- 2011 — "Koha s'kthehet" (Time doesn't return)

=== Singles ===
- 2014 — "Ke Harruar" (You have forgot)
- 2013 — "Në zemër të mbajë" (I keep you in my heart), featuring Yllka Kuqi.
- 2012 — "Për ty" (For you)
- 2012 — "Një jetë me ty" (A life with you)
- 2012 — "Nën frymën tënde" (Beneath your breath)
- 2011 - "Emrin tim"(My name)
- 2011 - "Bujë vetëm bujë", featuring Pirro Cako
- 2011 – "Dus të iki larg", featuring Rezarta Shkurta
- 2010 — "Koha s'kthehet" (Time doesn't return)
- 2010 — "Yjet s'bien shpeshë" (Stars don't falloften)
- 2008 — "Po më prite" (If you would wait for me)
- 2008 — "Mund të ishim bashkë" (We could have been together)
- 2007 — "Mall që djeg" (Craving that burns)
- 2007 — "Më mashtruan sytë"(My eyes fooled me)
