= Eranda Libohova =

Albanian singer (born 1969)

- Born: 11 September 1969 (age 56); Tirana, People's Socialist Republic of Albania
- Years active: 1986–present
- Relatives: Irma Libohova
- Musical career
- Genres: folk; light
- Occupation: singer
- Instruments: vocals

Eranda Libohova (born 11 September 1969) is an Albanian singer noted for her participation in national music festivals and her work in popular music. Active since the 1980s, she has remained a prominent figure in the Albanian music industry through her stage appearances, studio releases and live performances.

== Early life ==
Eranda Libohova was born in Tirana, People's Socialist Republic of Albania, on 11 September 1969. She grew up in a musically inclined family and began singing at the age of 14. Her older sister, Irma, was already an established singer and together they developed a strong artistic partnership early in Eranda’s career.

== Career ==
Libohova made her professional debut at Festivali i Këngës in 1986, performing alongside her sister with the song “Ku vajti vallë ai djalë”, which placed second in the competition. The following year, the sisters returned with “Nuk e harroj”, winning First Prize.

Throughout the 1990s and 2000s, Libohova continued to appear regularly at the festival, both in duets and as a solo performer, with songs such as “Bota iluzion” (1997), “Lypsarja” (1998) and “Më prit” (2001). In 1999, she and Irma achieved second place with the entry “Apokalipsi”.

In 2000, they won First Prize at the music festival Kënga Magjike with the song “1001 ëndërra”. Eranda would make subsequent solo appearances at the festival, including in 2010 with “Rroftë dashuria”, which received a special award and in 2011 with “Pa problem”. After an extended absence from Festivali i Këngës, she returned to the competition in 2018 with “100 pyetje”, finishing in third place.

She has released several studio albums and singles and continues to appear regularly on television music programs and in concerts.

== Discography ==
=== Albums ===
Year	Album
2000	Beqare jam betu
2007	Harrakate
—	Arvanitase
2019	O Natë, O Erë

=== Singles ===
Year	Song
—	"Një mijë ëndërra"
—	"Rroftë dashuria"
—	"Pa problem"
—	"Apokalipsi"
—	"Më prit"
—	"Buzët më ishin tharë"
—	"Të ndjej"
—	"Bota iluzion"
—	"Lypsarja"
—	"100 pyetje"
