= David Dreshaj =

Montenegrin-Albanian singer (born 1999)

- Born: 23 September 1999 (age 26); Podgorica, Montenegro, FR Yugoslavia
- Occupation: Singer
- Instruments: Guitar; piano
- Years active: 2016–present

David Dreshaj (Albanian: [daˈvid dɾɛˈʃaj]; born 23 September 1999) is an Albanian singer from Montenegro.

== Life and career ==
=== 1999–present: Early life and career beginnings ===
David Dreshaj was born on 23 September 1999 into an Albanian family in the city of Podgorica, Montenegro. As a child, Dreshaj became interested in music and attended a music school in Podgorica. Following this, the singer enrolled at a college in Albania and studied canto at the same time as taking piano and guitar lessons. He started his initial foray into the music industry in 2016 and in 2017 as he participated in Kënga Magjike on both occasions with the songs "Të kam" and "Vetëm ne të dy", respectively. After a year's absence, Dreshaj released his follow-up single "Bomb" and reached number 32 in Albania. He scored his first number-one single in September 2019 with "Sierra". Featuring dance-pop and deep house music, the follow-up, "Nuk e dua", eventually reached the top ten in Albania. His chart success ensued in March 2021 with the single "Lonely", marking his fourth chart appearance.

== Discography ==
=== Singles ===
==== As lead artist ====
List of singles as lead artist, with selected chart positions
Title	Year	Peak chart positions	Album
Title	Year	ALB	Album
"Loving You"	2016	—	Non-album singles
"Të kam"	2016	—	Non-album singles
"Eja"	2017	—	Non-album singles
"Vetëm ne të dy"	2017	—	Non-album singles
"Bomb"	2019	32	Non-album singles
"Dilema"	2019	—	Non-album singles
"Sierra"	2019	1	Non-album singles
"Nuk e dua"	2020	4	Non-album singles
"I Believe"	2020	—	Non-album singles
"Lonely"	2021	2	Non-album singles
"Ta fala"	2021	4	Non-album singles
"Ma le"	2021	11	Non-album singles
"Egoiste"	2021	—	Non-album singles
"Asaj"	2021	—	Non-album singles
"Ku je"	2022	16	Non-album singles
"—" denotes a recording that did not chart or was not released in that territory.
