= Nezha (given name) =

Nezha (نزهة) is a feminine given name of Arabic origin, often used in the Maghreb. Different forms and spellings exist : Naziha, Naze'eha, Neziha, Nouzha, Nazha, Nezihat, Nuzhat, Nuzhah, Nuzha, etc. The origin of this name is نزه and نزاهة, which mean honesty, virtuousness, righteousness, moral excellence and integrity. It may also refer to innocence, chastity and purity. When it is pronounced Nuzha, Nozha or Nouzha, it means a promenade, a pleasant walk in a garden or any floral environment.

== People named Nezha ==
- Nezha Alaoui, Moroccan entrepreneur
- Nezha Aït Baba, Moroccan footballer
- Nezha Bidouane (born 1969), Moroccan hurdler
- Nezha Chekrouni (born 1955), Moroccan politician
- Nezha Regragui, Moroccan actress
- Princess Lalla Nuzha of Morocco (1940–1977), Moroccan princess

== See also ==
- Laura Nezha, Albanian singer, actress, and director
- Nezha, Chinese mythical protection deity
