= Çiljeta =

Albanian singer, model and actress

- Born: Çiljeta Xhilaga; February 5, 1985 (age 41); Tirana, Albania
- Genres: Pop, dance
- Occupations: Singer-songwriter, mode, actress
- Instruments: Vocals
- Years active: 1999–present

Çiljeta Xhilaga (born February 5, 1985), also known mononymously as Çiljeta, is an Albanian singer, model and actress.

== Biography ==
Çiljeta was born into an Albanian family in Tirana, Albania, to Ferdinand Xhilaga, an accountant whose family hails from Dibër but who was born in Delvinë, and Majlinda Xhilaga, a hairdresser from Korçë. She attended the Sami Frashëri High School in Tirana.

== Career as model ==
Xhilaga featured in the Miss Shqipëria competition in 2001 and won the title "Miss Cinema".

== Career as singer ==
Çiljeta distinguished herself in the successful song "Dridhe", a collaboration with Getoar Selimi of Tingulli 3nt, a rap group from Kosovo. The song was followed by many successful ones, especially "Puçi Puçi" (English: Kiss kiss), featuring Ingrid Gjoni, and "Të dy qajmë të ndarë" (English: Away we both cry), a hit composed by Flori Mumajesi and with lyrics by Ardit Roshi in Kënga Magjike 2010, where she cried while performing it. Çiljeta had already performed in the Kënga Magjike 08 with "S'ke ku vete" (English: Can't go nowhere).

Çiljeta participated in the second season of Dancing with the Stars show along with partner Dion Gjinika.

== Private life ==
Çiljeta had a son on February 4, 2013, whom she named after her father. Father of the baby, is reportedly a French architect with a Latin American background. She is a well known supporter of Partizani Tirana. She is dating Alban Hoxha, an Albanian football player.

== Politics ==
Early in her career, Çiljeta was a vocal supporter of the Democratic Party of Albania, and its leader Lulzim Basha. She once sang in New York, in a party organised by Red and Black Alliance, now an extinguished party, but declared that she was unaware of who the organiser of the party was. Çiljeta declared herself a supporter of the Socialist Party of Albania, having changed her political opinion, and participated in Erion Veliaj’s campaign for mayor of Tirana in the 2023 Albanian local elections.

She notably had two public reactions against Serbia and Greece politicians: to Serbia after the Serbian government removed a memorial to the Liberation Army of Preševo, Medveđa and Bujanovac in Preševo, an Albanian-inhabited region of Serbia. The second reaction was to Greece, after she saw in television an anti-Albanian interview of Christos Pappas, a politician of the Golden Dawn, a Greek far-right political party. After these declarations, the Greek media attacked her, saying that she "claims to be a singer, but must be something else," and published provoking photos of Çiljeta.

== Humanitarian activities ==
On March 20, 2012, Çiljeta was reported by the media to visit a correctional facility for minors, where she met 38 children, a meeting organised by the Institute of Minors in Kavajë, the Centre for the Human Rights of Children of Albania, and UNICEF.

== Notable singles ==
- "Çokollata" (English: Chocolate)
- "Çuna, Çuna" (English: Boys, boys)
- "Do do ti do" (English: Yes, yes, you want to)
- "Dorëheqja" (English: Surrender)
- "Dridhe" (English: Shake it)
- "Duty free"
- "Falma" (English: Forgive me)
- "Kur këndoj serenate" (English: When I sing a serenade)
- "Maria"
- "Mike dhë rivale" (feat. Ingrid Gjoni) (English: Friends and rivals)
- "Puçi Puçi" (feat. Ingrid Gjoni) (English: Kiss kiss)
- "S'ke ku vete" (English: Can't go anywhere)
- "Të dy qajmë të ndarë" (English: We both cry separated)
- "Tekila" (English: Tequila)
- "Vetëm ti" (English: Only you)
- "Nuk e di pse më do" (English: I don't know what to do)
