= Ingrit Gjoni =

Albanian singer and dancer 1981)

- Born: 24 December 1981; Tirana, People's Socialist Republic of Albania
- Years active: 2005–present
- Relatives: Inis Gjoni
- Musical career
- Genres: pop; dance
- Occupation: singer
- Instruments: vocals
- Labels: Faber Media

Ingrit Gjoni (born 24 December 1981) is an Albanian singer, dancer, actress and former model, known for her dynamic stage presence and numerous appearances in Albanian music festivals. She first came into the public's attention as a talented dancer and stage performer before establishing herself as a recording artist.

== Early life and education ==
Ingrit Gjoni’s first connection to the stage started in ballet. At the age of nine, her dancing talent attracted the attention of renowned choreographer Llaqi Nako, who selected her as a soloist in his troupe. During her teenage years she developed a passion for modeling and went on to become one of the first Albanian photoshoot models featured in magazines and calendars.

In 1998 she moved to Greece, where she spent four years working and performing, followed by a brief period in the United States, where she continued practicing and developing professionally. Gjoni later graduated from the Academy of Fine Arts with a degree in acting.

== Career ==
In 2002, she was named one of Albania’s most successful cover girls. Her music career began in 2005, when she debuted alongside her sister, Inis Gjoni, with the album "Imazh i Ri", a ten-track release published by SuperStar music label. The following year, she released the hit "Përse me mua", accompanied by a music video and later took part in Top Fest 3 with Sabiani, performing the duet "Parajsa".

In 2007, she continued with several successful releases, including "Jek e Jek", "Barbie Silikon" and "Vitamina". Gjoni returned to Top Fest 5, in 2008, with "Weekend", reaching the finals and that same year, collaborated with Çiljeta on the hit song "Puçi Puçi".

Throughout 2009, she released several new projects, including "Njëri tjetrit", "Ekstrem" and "Hypnotize me". She also competed in Kënga Magjike 2009 with the song "Nemi Nemi", winning the Best Dance award. Her next hit song, "Sick", was a collaboration with Kastro Zizo and Og.

In 2010, Gjoni released her second studio album, "Ekstrem", published by Super Sonic. The music video for "I’m Sorry", filmed in Lalzi Bay, with multiple visual settings, became one of the most popular clips of the summer. In 2011, she returned with another collaboration, releasing the song "Relax", featuring Stine.

In the spring of 2012, she released the music video for the song "Harronim të dy". Later that year, she participated at Kënga Magjike 14 with "Më duaj", reaching the semi-final.

== Discography ==
=== Albums ===
Year	Album
2005	Imazh i Ri (feat. Inis Gjoni)
2010	Ekstrem

=== Kënga Magjike ===
Year	Song	Result
2009	"Nemi Nemi"	Best Dance
2012	"Më duaj"	Semi-final

=== Top Fest ===
Year	Song
2004	"Mbrëmjes ja shtova yjet"
2006	"Parajsa" (feat. Sabiani)
2008	"Weekend"
2009	"Ekstrem"

=== Singles ===
Year	Single
2005	"Pa titull" (feat. Inis Gjoni)
2005	"I ziu ti"
2006	"Përse me mua"
2006	"Parajsa" (feat. Sabiani)
2007	"Jek e Jek"
2007	"Barbie Silikon"
2007	"Vitamina"
2008	"Puçi Puçi"
2009	"Njëri tjetrit"
2009	"Ekstrem"
2009	"Hypnotize me"
2009	"Sick" (feat. Kastro Zizo & OG)
2010	"I'm sorry"
2011	"Relax" (feat. Stine)
2012	"Harronim të dy"
2012	"Mbretëreshë" (feat. Gjeto Luca)
