= Rezarta Shkurta =

Albanian singer (born 1986)

- Born: 18 November 1986 (age 39); Durrës, People's Socialist Republic of Albania
- Occupations: singer; songwriter; recording artist
- Years active: 2006–present
- Notable work: I pafat; Budallaçkë e vogël; Më fal
- Musical career
- Genres: pop; contemporary Albanian music

Rezarta Shkurta (born 18 November 1986) is an Albanian pop singer and model. She has been active in the Albanian music industry since her debut in 2006 and is known for her participation in major music festivals and her contributions to contemporary Albanian pop music.

== Early life and education ==
Rezarta Shkurta was born on 18 November 1986 in the Albanian coastal city of Durrës. She completed her primary and secondary schooling in Durrës. Before beginning her music career, she participated in beauty pageants; in 2005 she was crowned Miss Durrësi and subsequently placed second in the Miss Albania competition, representing her hometown.

== Career ==
Shkurta's music career began in 2006 when she made her debut at the Kënga Magjike music festival with the song “DJ”, marking her first stage performance. In 2007 she returned to Kënga Magjike with “I pafat” earning the festival's television award. In 2008 she made several festival appearances by performing at Top Fest with “Kafazi” and at Polifest with “Engjëjt luten për ne”.

At Kënga Magjike 2010, Shkurta performed the song “Budallaçkë e vogël” presenting a distinctive and theatrical stage show that earned her the trend award and ninth place overall. In 2011 she released a duet with Vedat Ademi titled “Dua të iki larg” and later competed again in Kënga Magjike with “Të jesh e mirë s’mjafton”, winning the Best Performance award and finishing twelfth in the contest. Her next hit was released in 2012, a song titled “Më fal”.

After a brief hiatus, she returned to the music scene in 2016 with the release of the music video “Gjysma ime”.

== Personal life ==
Rezarta Shkurta is married to Ermal Hoxha, grandson of former dictator Enver Hoxha. The couple have a daughter, Hera. Their relationship and family life have been the subject of public interest in Albanian media.

== Discography ==
=== Singles ===
Year	Song
2006	DJ
2007	I pafat
2008	Kafazi
2008	Engjëjt luten për ne
2010	Budallaçkë e vogël
2011	Dua të iki larg (feat. Vedat Ademi)
2011	Të jesh e mirë s’mjafton
2012	Më fal
2016	Gjysma ime
