= Nataku =

Nataku may refer to:

- Nezha, spelled "Nataku" in Japanese, a Taoist protection deity
- Nataku (X), a fictional character in X/1999 manga and anime
- War Prince Nataku, a fictional character in the Saiyuki manga and anime, who is loosely based on the actual deity
- XXXG-01S Shenlong Gundam, nickname Nataku, a fictional weapon in Gundam Wing anime series

== See also ==
- Nezha (disambiguation)
