= Anxhelina Hadërgjonaj =

Kosovar-American singer (born 1995)

- Born: 1 December 1995 (age 30); Los Angeles, California, United States
- Occupations: Singer, blogger, influencer
- Years active: 2010–present
- Parents: Mentor Hadërgjonaj (father); Albërie Hadërgjonaj (mother)
- Relatives: Alban Ramosaj (cousin); Beatrix Ramosaj (cousin); Argjentina Ramosaj (cousin)
- Musical career
- Genres: Pop; R&B
- Label: Onima
- Website: anxhelinamusic.com

Anxhelina Hadërgjonaj (Albanian: [andʒɛˈlina hadəɾˈɟɔnaj]; born 1 December 1996), known mononymously as Anxhelina, is a Kosovan singer.

== Early life ==
Anxhelina Hadërgjonaj was born on 1 December 1996

in Los Angeles, California to Albanian parents Mentor and Albërie Hadërgjonaj, originally from Kosovo.

== Career ==
Hadërgjonaj commenced her early forays into the music industry in 2010 with the releases of "Kopje pa kuptim" and in the following year with "Kjo jetë s'mjaftoi". After nine years, in December 2020, she released her comeback single "Precious", which achieved modest success, reaching the top 10 in Albania. Her chart success followed into 2021 with the follow-up single, "No Drama", peaking at number 10 in Albania.

== Musical style ==
Hadërgjonaj's music style has been regarded as pop and R&B. She has expressed her desire to collaborate with Billie Eilish, Dua Lipa, SZA and Drake.

== Discography ==
=== Singles ===
List of singles as lead artist, with selected chart positions
Title	Year	Peak chart positions	Album
Title	Year	ALB	Album
"Kopje pa kuptim"	2010	—N/a	Non-album singles
"Kjo jetë s'mjaftoi"	2011	—N/a	Non-album singles
"Precious"	2020	9	Non-album singles
"No Drama"	2021	10	Non-album singles
"Run For"	2021	5	Non-album singles
"Anash" (featuring Flori Mumajesi)	2021	3	Non-album singles
"Doja" (featuring Flori Mumajesi )	2021	3	Non-album singles
"—" denotes a recording that did not chart or was not released in that territory.
