= Gonxhe Manakovska =

Albanian singer

Gonxhe Manaku or Manakovska (25th of July 1921 in Bitola, Kingdom of Yugoslavia — 2012, Gothenburg) was an Orthodox Albanian folk singer from Bitola in present-day North Macedonia. Active primarily in the 1950s and 1960s, she was among the first Albanian women to perform on Radio Skopje and is remembered for her contributions to Albanian folk music during a formative era for Albanian-language media in Yugoslavia.

== Discography ==
- Karajfili e Zambaku- 1958
- Iptida Per Te Paren Here
- Ida Due Me Fillue- 1958
- Qitma Moj Naze
- Ani Mori Nuse
- O Ti Det, O Ujë i Njelmët
- Oda Me Tavan
- Ani Krisi Pushka-1962
- Dashnuer T'u Bana
- More Muse, Musa Vogel
- Oh, N'at Fushë Të Mejdanit-1962
- I Vujtur Jam Ne Kete Jete
- Pasha Syte E Mija
- I Hypa Vaporit
- Pranvera Ka Nise Me Dale
- Dil Nje Here Moj Vajze E Bukur
- Moj E Mira
