= Rina Balaj =

Kosovo-Albanian rapper and singer (born 1999)

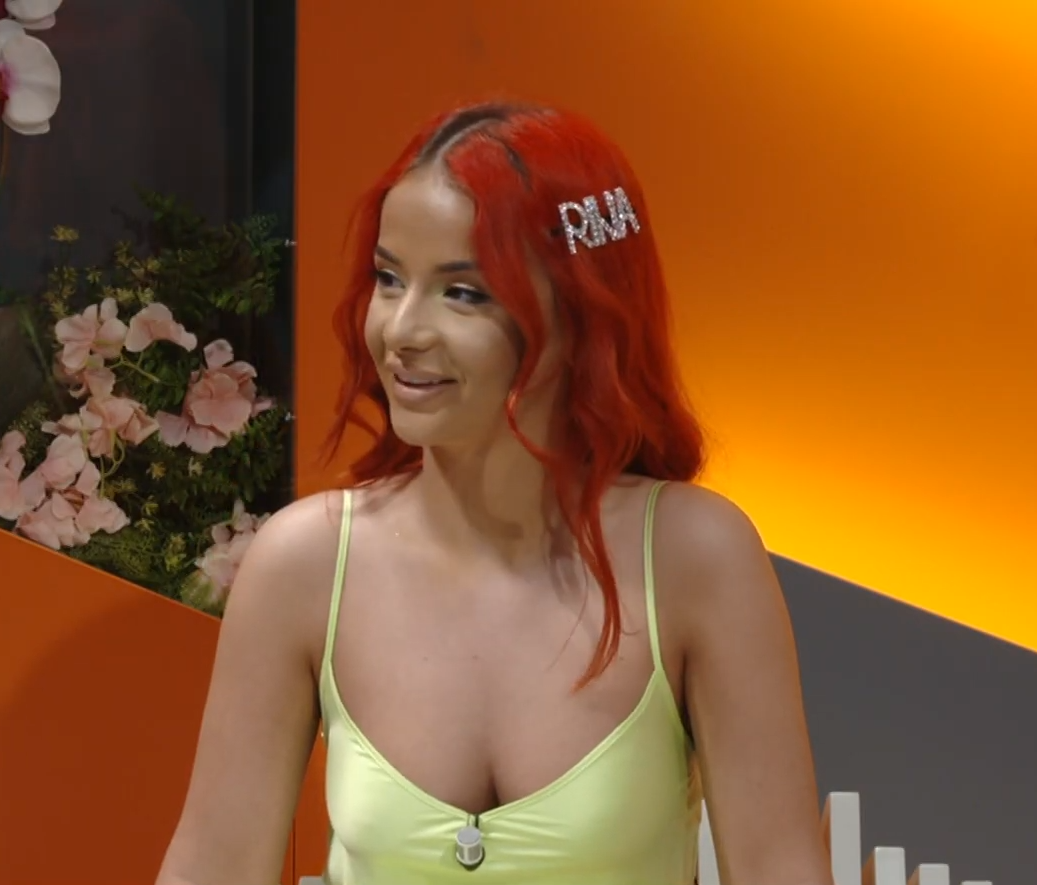
- Balaj in 2019
- Born: 27 January 1999 (age 27); Peja, FR Yugoslavia
- Occupations: Rapper; singer
- Years active: 2017 – present
- Musical career
- Genres: Hip hop; trap
- Labels: AlphaPop Original; Universal

Rina Balaj (Albanian: [ɾiˈna baˈlaj]; born 27 January 1999), known mononymously as Rina, is a Kosovo-Albanian rapper and singer.

== Life and career ==
=== 1999–2019: Early life and career beginnings ===
Rina Balaj was born on 27 January 1999 into an Albanian family in the city of Peja and raised in Istog, Kosovo. At age 16, Balaj unsuccessfully auditioned for the fourth season of X Factor Albania in 2015. In December 2017, she was featured on Albanian singer Endri's single "Janari" and reached number 6 in Albania. Eventually signed by OnRecords, her debut single "Për ty" followed afterwards in March 2018. In September 2018, Balaj released her breakthrough single "Gigi" in collaboration with Greek-Albanian rapper Sin Boy. The single initially attained success in Albania, peaking at number 8, and later became acclaimed in neighbouring Greece, reaching the top 3.

=== 2020–present: Mama and Balerina ===
In May 2020, Balaj released her first collaborative album, MM, with Sin Boy featuring songs written in Albanian, Greek and English. Four subsequent singles, "Meredith", "Tentacion", "GG" and "Sari" were released from the collaborative album. "Meredith" peaked at number 86 in Greece, while "Tentacion" reached the top five peaking at number four. "Sari" also experienced commercial success and reached number 32 in Albania and 52 in Greece, respectively. In June 2020, her follow-up single, "Fallin In Love", went on to reach number 33 in Greece. Later that year in December 2020, her single "Zjarr" in collaboration with Sin Boy reached number 35 in her native country.

== Artistry ==
Balaj's music style has generally been regarded as trap although her music also includes various styles of musical genres such as R&B and hip hop. She has cited American rapper Post Malone as her favourite artist. Music critics compared her music and appearance to that of American rapper Cardi B. MM, the collaborative studio album with Sin Boy, was praised for recreating pop music and also adapting to different styles including reggaeton, disco and house.

== Personal life ==
In 2019, Balaj began a romantic relationship with Greek-Albanian rapper Sin Boy.

== Discography ==
=== Albums ===
- MM (2020)
- Balerina (2021)

=== Singles ===
==== As lead artist ====
===== 2010s =====
List of singles in the 2010s decade, with selected chart positions
Title	Year	Peak chart positions		Album
Title	Year	ALB	GRE	Album
"Për ty"	2018	31	—	Non-album single
"Ska konkurenc" (featuring Fero)	2018	2	—	Non-album single
"Ashiqare"	2018	33	—	Non-album single
"Mami"	2018	28	—	Non-album single
"Gigi" (featuring Sin Boy)	2018	5	1	Non-album single
"Fly" (featuring Fuego)	2018	2	—	Non-album single
"Ilegal"	2019	29	—	Non-album single
"Qikat" (featuring Adelina Ismajli)	2019	—	—	Non-album single
"Jumanji" (featuring Blake)	2019	—	—	Non-album single
"Ideal" (featuring Koston)	2019	—	—	Non-album single
"Meredith" (with Sin Boy)	2019	—	86	MM
"—" denotes a recording that did not chart or was not released in that territory.

===== 2020s =====
List of singles in the 2020s decade, with selected chart positions
Title	Year	Peak chart positions		Album
Title	Year	ALB	GRE	Album
"Tentacion" (with Sin Boy)	2020	—	4	MM
"GG" (with Sin Boy)	2020	—	—	MM
"Sari" (with Sin Boy)	2020	32	52	MM
"Fallin In Love" (with Sin Boy)	2020	—	33	Non-album single
"Zjarr"	2020	35	—	Non-album single
"Bad Rosita"	2021	—	—	Balerina
"California"	2021	—	—	Balerina
"Addiction"	2021	16	—	Balerina
"Mia"	2021	57	—	Balerina
"Sativa"	2022	17	—	Non-album single
"Demon"	2022	—	—	Non-album single
"Blue" (with Amelia)	2022	73	—	Non-album single
"Si ti" (with Sin Boy)	2022	39	39	Non-album single
"—" denotes a recording that did not chart or was not released in that territory.

==== As featured artist ====
List of singles as featured artist, with selected chart positions
Title	Year	Peak chart positions	Album
Title	Year	ALB	Album
"Janari" (Endri featuring Rina)	2017	6	Non-album single
"Down On Me" (K Koke featuring Rina)	2018	—	Non-album single
"—" denotes a recording that did not chart or was not released in that territory.
