= Florat =

Swiss-Albanian rapper and producer (born 1997)

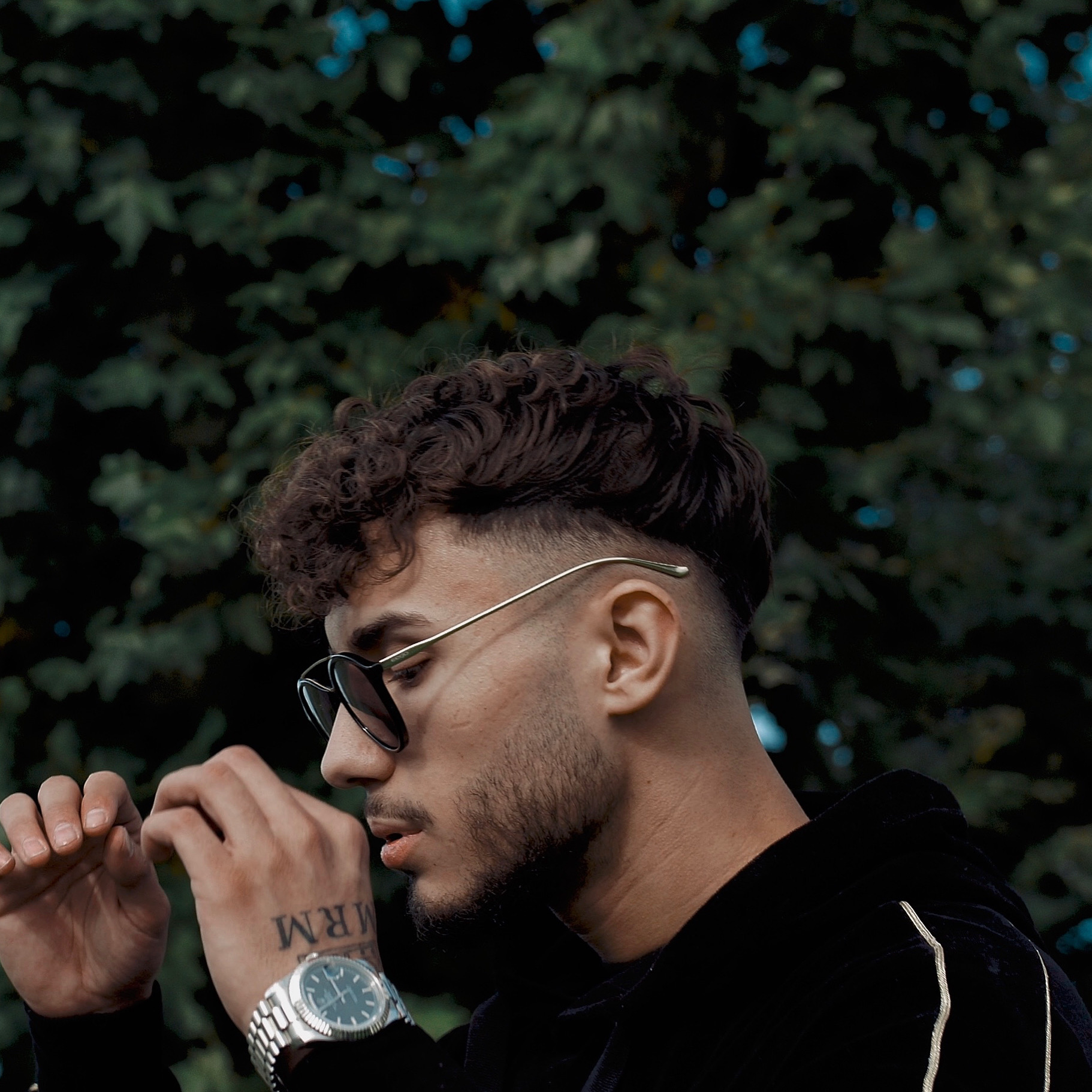

Background information
- Born: Florat Qerimi (Note: Some sources refer to his surname as "Cerimi".); 1997 (age 28–29); Muri, Aargau, Switzerland
- Genre: Hip hop
- Occupations: Rapper, producer
- Label: MRM

Florat Qerimi (born 1997), known professionally as Florat, is a Swiss-Albanian rapper and producer. He is the co-founder of the hip hop group and label MRM.

== Early life ==
Florat Qerimi was born in 1997 in Muri, Aargau, Switzerland. He is of Kosovar Albanian descent. His grandfather went to work in Switzerland in 1971, and took his family with him in 1990. Florat was born and raised in a tough neighborhood in Zürich. However, he managed to avoid trouble and soon became interested in football and martial arts.

== Career ==
Florat's interest in hip-hop music began by listening to hip-hop artists such as Tupac Shakur and 50 Cent, and later R&B artists such as Chris Brown. He started to experiment with rhyming and rapping with his friends, with whom he would establish his record label MRM (an acronym for MoreMoney). Later, they set up a recording studio in a basement of one of the apartment blocks nearby where they recorded their first songs, "Vi me Benzo" and "Komm mit", which were produced by DJ A-Boom (who had previously worked with Kosovo-Albanian singers Noizy and Era Istrefi). "Vi me Benzo" and "Komm mit" proved successful, achieving nearly 1 million YouTube visits each, and expanding Florat's fanbase.

He made his debut live appearance on 8 June 2019 in a public event held Oberhausen, Germany. In this event, which was organized by the FC Prishtina ultras Plisat, Florat performed alongside Kosovo-Albanian rapper Tayna.

Florat's songs are played regularly by nightclubs in Kosovo and Albanian diaspora.

== Discography ==
=== Singles ===
Year	Name	Producer(s)	Release date
2018	Lej	Rzon, Salvy	23 December 2018
2019	Vi me Benzo	DJ A-Boom	28 March 2019
2019	Komm mit	DJ A-Boom	10 June 2019
2019	Rosegold	DJ A-Boom	14 November 2019
2020	Oh Mama	DJ A-Boom, IJ	17 February 2020
2020	Ti Amo	Florat, Salvy	13 August 2020
2020	Bacardi	Florat, Salvy	10 September 2020
