= David Tukiçi =

Albanian composer and singer (born 1956)

David Tukiçi GM
- Born: 27 June 1956; Shkodër, Albania
- Occupations: Singer; Composer; Conductor
- Musical career
- Genres: Folk; Symphony
- Instruments: Vocals, Piano

David Tukiçi (Albanian pronunciation: [daˈvid tuˈkitʃi] born 27 June 1956) is an Albanian composer, singer and former child actor. He was a participant of Festivali i Këngës a number of times, winning aged 13 the 1969 edition with the song "Dhuratë për ditëlindje". Tukiçi also participated in the 1990 edition alongside Nertila Koka, with the song "Sagapo, të dua", which he also composed. Another composition of his "Dy gëzime në një ditë", also sung by Nertila Koka, would win the 1986 edition of the competition. Other compositions include "Mirësevjen ditë e re" sung by Afërdita Laçi and "Artistë në jetë" sung by Lindita Theodhori.

He also pursued composition training notably with Çesk Zadeja, who was himself a pupil of Dmitri Shostakovich. From 1982 to 1992, he was the director of Radio Televizioni Shqiptar's symphonic music.

At the École normale de musique – Alfred Cortot de Paris, he studied with Michel Merlet and Dominique Rouits. He is the author of many symphonic compositions, both instrumental and vocal. Many of his pieces have been recorded. Notable among these is Horcynus Orca, a double concerto for flute, cello and string orchestra, composed in 2001 at the Politeama Siracusa and recorded in 2003, under his direction, by the Symphonic Orchestra of Calabria, featuring soloists Sonia Formenti and Francesco Mariozzi.

David Tukiçi is the son of Ibrahim Tukiqi and brother of Genc Tukiçi.

== Bibliography ==
- "David Tukiçi", in Sax, Mule & Co, Jean-Pierre Thiollet, Paris, H & D, 2004 (pp.|183–184). ISBN 2-914266-03-0
