= Pavlina Nikaj =

Background information
- Born: May 15, 1931; Korçë, Albania
- Died: October 14, 2011 (aged 80) Tirana, Albania
- Genres: Easy listening, folk
- Occupation: Singer
- Years active: 1945–1986

Pavlina Nikaj (1931–2011) was an Albanian singer. Together with Anita Take and Pjetër Gjergji, she is considered the pioneer of the easy listening interpretation in Albania.

Nikaj was born in Korçë, on 15 May 1931. She started her career as a singer in 1945, in the so-called Syndicate's Chorus (Albanian: Kori i Sindikatave) in Korçë, and later in Radio Korça. In 1950, she started as a professional singer in the Assembly of the Army (Albanian: Ansambli i Ushtrisë), and in 1957 she was affiliated with the Theatre of Estrada of Tirana. There she would stay for around 20 years.
Her repertoire includes songs which have remained as classic of the light Albanian music, and well-known during the Communist period. Between others: Udhët e lumturisë (Happiness roads), S’të harroj (I don't forget you), Kënga ime të kushtohet ty (My song goes to you), Midis gushës ke një pikë (A birthmark in your neck), etc.

Beside "easy listening" genre, she also interpreted folkloric music and was specifically known for the songs from Vlora town. Her last stage appearance was in 1986, in a recital concert of the Estrada of Tirana, directed by Kosta Kamberi.
For her significant contribution in the Albanian music, she was awarded by the President of Albania with the Silver "Naim Frashëri" Order, in 2005. The awards was personally delivered to her by back then Minister of Culture Arta Dade. The same year she declared "Qytetare Nderi" (Honorary citizenship) of Tirana.
