= Xhoni Athanas =

Albanian operatic tenor (1925–2019)

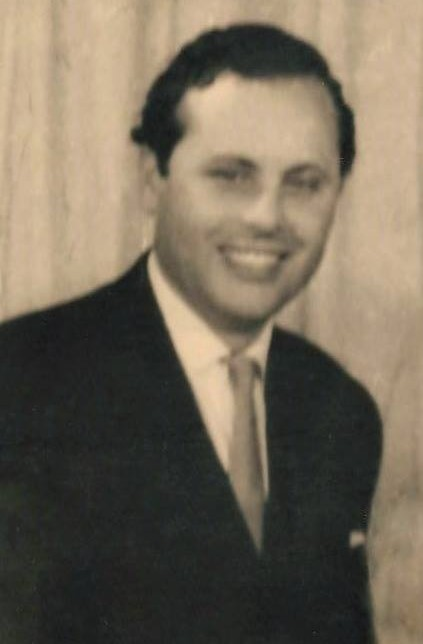
Xhoni Athanas in 1961

Xhoni Athanas (November 4, 1925 – October 1, 2019), also known as Gjoni Athanas or John Athanas, was an Albanian-American operatic tenor. He received numerous awards during his career as an opera singer, including Artist i Merituar (Merited Artist), Medalja e Mirnjohjes (Medal of Gratitude), Mjeshter i Madh (Great Master), all awarded by the Albanian Presidents, and Lifetime achievement award awarded by the Albanian-American organization AANO in Boston.

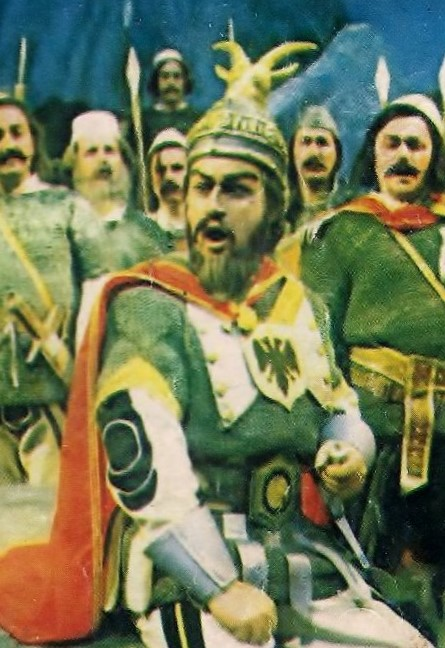
Xhoni Athanas in live performance of the opera Skenderbeu in 1968

He is remembered for his portrayal of Scanderbeg in the opera Skenderbeu by Albanian composer Prenk Jakova.

== Early life ==
Xhoni was born on November 4, 1925, in Brockton, Massachusetts. His parents, Olympia and Thanas, both of Albanian origin, had lived in America as immigrants for almost 20 years. Two years after Xhoni's birth, the family returned to Albania, to the region of Korca.

From an early age, Xhoni started to sing Byzantine psalms in the Christian Orthodox Church of Grapsh, a small village in the region of Korca, Albania, where his father served as minister. His father had a musical education, and would perform music in the church he practiced in. He encouraged his son to pursue a singing career. The music of his father's church services, as well as Korca's folk songs, served as a foundation for Xhoni's vocal education.

In 1940, at the age of fifteen, Xhoni moved to the city of Korca to pursue a singing career. He joined the Motropolia Chorus and the Group "Lira" as a soloist, where he was recognized as a tenor with a beautiful and powerful voice. He moved to Tirana in 1947, where he became involved with the Albanian Military Chorus under director Gaqo Avrazi. The Chorus toured Albania and many Eastern European countries. During these tours, Athanas earned significant recognition and performed with Avni Mula, Ibrahim Tukici, Mentor Xhemali, Luk Kacaj, Ndrek Gjergji, and Maliq Herri, among others.

== Education and career ==
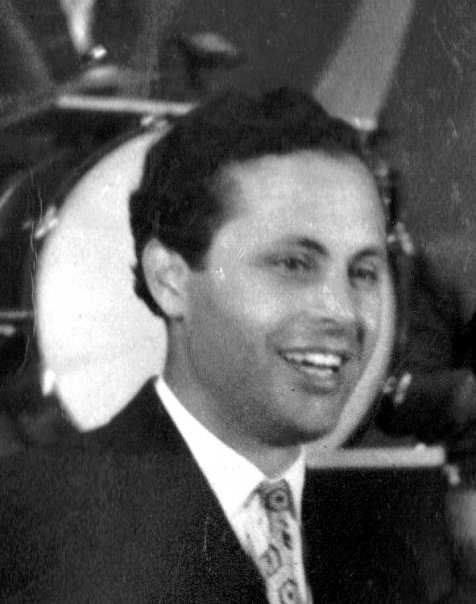
Xhoni Athanas in 1960

In 1952, he earned a scholarship to study at the Tchaikovsky Conservatory in Moscow as an operatic tenor. He studied with Professor Alexander Baturin. At the end of his studies in 1957 he was awarded the second prize in the International Contest of new operatic voices in Moscow, having competed against 110 participants from all over the world. He received the Honorary Degree signed by well known tenor Tito Schipa, then director of the Jury.

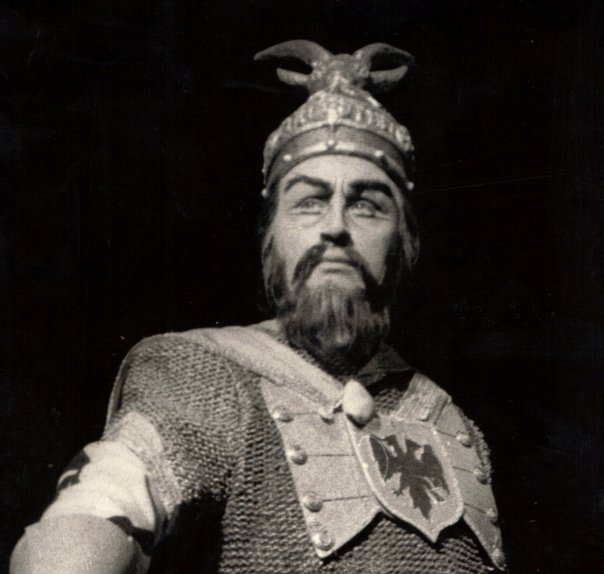
Xhoni Athanas in the role of Scanderbeg in 1968 from the opera Skenderbeu by Prenk Jakova

After finishing his studies, he returned to Tirana, and joined the Teatri i Operas dhe Baletit. There, he gave critically acclaimed performances in the roles of Turidu from Mascagni's Cavalleria rusticana, Canio from Leoncavallo's Pagliacci, Lenskey from Tchaikovsky's Eugene Onegin, Schaunard from Puccini's La bohème, Don Basilio from Mozart's The Marriage of Figaro, Dhimitri from K. Konos' Lulja e kujtimit, Bash Murgjini from A. Mula's Borana, Kuestori from V. Nova's Heroina, and Doda from P. Jakova's Mrika, among others. Apart from interpreting as a soloist at the Theater of Opera in Tirana, he also participated in hundreds of shows, concerts and tours around the world. He performed in Romania, Soviet Union, China, Mongolia, Korea, Vietnam, Bulgaria, Ukraine, Lithuania, Yugoslavia, and Hungary. The Moscow newspaper Culture in 1959 wrote: “Every theater in the world would be honored to have a tenor like John Athanas". Brymorov, a well-known professor from the Bulgarian Conservatory, praised the voice of Athanas as “a rare voice that deserves worldly respect”. Toti dal Monte, a famous Italian soprano, said after listening to him in one of the studios in Moscow: “Athanas is a rare voice of a dramatic tenor".

In 1960 he married Sekine Sharofi Athanas, a classical ballerina. He has two daughters, Mirela and Edlira Athanas, as well as a niece named Juia and a nephew named Easton.

In his personal records, written between 1957 and 1993, he counts over 1100 concerts and 450 operatic performances. He is best known for his role as Scanderbeg in the Albanian Opera Skenderbeu by Prenk Jakova, regarded as one of Albania's most iconic fictional heroes.

== Later career ==
He was a professor of bel canto at the Academy of Arts in Tirana for about 20 years. He also directed the staging of scenes from the operas Norma, Rigoletto, Tosca, Madama Butterfly, and Carmen in the 1990s. Additionally, he worked on books on singing techniques, such as Singing, A Way of Expression and Communication and Breathing Techniques for the Singer. He also worked on a book collecting rare Albanian folk songs.

== Later life ==
In 2006, he was awarded the Medallion of Gratitude from the President of Albania in 2006 for his singing career, for the interpretation of the role of Scanderbeg and in recognition of his involvement with the Albanian community of Boston, where he performed continuously in gatherings and events. He also performed numerous times for the Russian and Italian community of Boston.

His last stage appearance was in September 2012 at the age of eighty-seven, at a concert in Boston celebrating 100 years of Albanian independence, for the Albanian community, where, accompanied by his daughter Mirela Athanas on the piano, he performed Lirine s'ua solla une, Scanderbeg's aria, for the final time. He received the titles of Merited Artist (Artist i Merituar) and Great Master (Mjeshter i Madh) for his interpretations in Tirana, Albania. In 2015, he was awarded the Lifetime Achievement Award from the organization of AANO in Boston.

After a two-year long struggle with illnesses, Xhoni Athanas died on October 1, 2019 at the age of 93, surrounded by his family. A recording of his performance of Beethoven's In questa tomba oscura was played during his funeral. His memorial site is located in Winchester, Massachusetts.
