= Sin Boy =

Albanian rapper (born 1994)

- Also known as: Sin Boy
- Born: Theodore Agustin Geka; 18 August 1994 (age 32); Nea Ionia, Greece
- Genres: Pop rap; trap
- Occupations: Rapper; singer; songwriter
- Years active: 2013–present
- Labels: AlphaPop , ArigatoMafia

Theodore Agustin Geka (Greek: Θεόδωρος Αγκουστίν Γκέκα, born 18 August 1994), known professionally as "Sin Boy", is a Greek rapper, singer, and songwriter of Albanian descent.

== Life and career ==
Agustin was born on 18 August 1994 into an Albanian family in Nea Ionia, a northern suburb of Athens, Greece. Describing his early life, he stated that he was a victim of racism mostly because of his Albanian background.

He started his career on 2013 because of the "Amita Motion Positive Group" project, the music platform / challenge that was ran that year by Amita Motion

== Personal life ==
In 2019, Agustin began a romantic relationship with Kosovo-Albanian singer Rina. During an interview in Greece, he stated that he is not seeking Greek citizenship because of the mandatory military service.

== Discography ==
=== Albums ===
- Sin Boy (2016)
- Ka Gu Ras (2019)
- MM (2020)
- One Love (2020)
- Nos (2021)
- Old But Gold (2022)
- Born Star (2022)
- Genius (2022)
- Ka Gu Ras III (2023)
- ZERO2HERO (2023)
- Ka Gu Ras 7 (2024)
- Pre Za Ki (2024)
- #kosovoisalbania (2024)
- GTA VI (2025)
- HOODA (2025)
- eisai kathisterimenos? (2025)
- Old But Gold II (2025)
- LAIKOS (2025)
- FXCK MUSIC INDUSTRY (2026)

=== Singles ===
==== As lead artist ====
Title	Year	Peak chart positions		Album
Title	Year	ALB	GRE	Album
Thelo toso na sou po (Θέλω τόσο να σου πω )	2013	–	–	Amita Motion Positive Group (2013)
"An to theleis (Αν το θέλεις)(featuring Stan)	2013	–	–	Amita Motion Positive Group (2013)
"Paradexou to (Παραδέξου το)"	2013	–	–	Amita Motion Positive Group (2013)
"Koble (Κομπλέ)"	2013	–	–	Non album-single
"De thelo na ksero (Δε θέλω να ξέρω)"	2013	–	–	Non album-single
"Agapi mou to ksereis (Αγάπη μου το ξέρεις)"	2013	–	–	Non album-single
"Ντάγκλα"		—	—	Non album-single
"Να σου πω κάτι / Sin Boy's Remix"				Non album-single
"24hrs"				Non album-single
"Lara"	2014	–	–	Non album-single
"Ziguzigule"	2015			Non album-single
"Agiasa to poto" (featuring Lito Garcia)	2015			Non album-single
"Allaxe mou ta fwta (Άλλαξε μου τα φώτα)"(featuring Emilia Barak)	2015			Non album-single
"Ta Koritsia Partaroun"	2015			Non album-single
"Barbie" (featuring Taki Tsan)	2015	—	—	Non album-single
'Mr doumanis"	2016			Non album-single
"Dab"	2016			Non album-single
"2Fake"	2016			Non album-single
"Ypotrofia (Υποτροφία)"(Featuring Sugar Boy)	2016	–	–	Non album-single
"Panda (REMIX)"(featuring iLLEOo)	2016	–	–	Non album-single
"Kina (Κίνα)" (featuring ominus)	2016	-	—	Non album-single
"Titanic (Τιτανικός)"	2016	–	–	Non album-single
"kolos"(featuring iLLEOo)	2016	–	–	Non album-single
"Instagram Girls"(featuring iLLEOo)	2016	–	–	Non album-single
"Bachelor (Ναι Τα Λεφτά)"	2016	-	—	Non album-single
"Nin (Γίνε η νυν)"	2017	—	—	Non album-single
"Den Ta Ehoume (Δεν Τα Έχουμε)" (featuring Leo White)	2017			Non album-single
"Prosopikotita (Tautotita)"	2017	—	—	Non album-single
"Kariolis (Καριόλης)"	2017	—	—	Non album-single
"Draco"	2017	—	—	Non album-single
"1 Night Stand" (featuring PL)	2017	—	—	Non album-single
"Lazarat"	2017			Non album-single
"Florian Marku"	2017	—	—	Non album-single
"(Tzoulia)"(featuring iLLEOo)	2017			Non album-single
"Rolex"	2017			Non album-single
"Repeat"(featuring Arva)	2017			Non album-single
"Tsounami"	2017			Non album-single
"Instafram Story"(featuring Kim, RiskyKidd)	2017			Non album-single
"Eleos" (featuring Skull)	2017	—	—	Non album-single
"Cocoree"	2017			Non album-single
"Mana" (featuring Antonis Rigas)	2017	—	—	Non album-single
"Playboy"	2017			Non album-single
"Πάγο Στο Λαιμό" (iLLEOo featuring Sin Boy)	2017			Non album-single
"Gang"	2017	—	—	Non album-single
"Min Klais" (with Antonis Rigas)	2017	—	—	Non album-single
"High"	2018	—	—	Non album-single
"Kriti(Κρήτη)"	2018			Non album-single
"Sofia"	2018			Non album-single
"Sex"	2018			Non album-single
"Matias(Εγκληματίας)"	2018			Non album-single
"Tha Pethanoume Neoi (Θα Πεθάνουμε Νέοι)"	2018			Non album-single
"Ghetto" (MG featuring Sin Boy)	2018			Non album-single
"Colombiana" (featuring Skull)	2018	—	—	Non album-single
"Gigi" (Rina featuring Sin Boy)	2018	5	1	Non album-single
"Pipa(Sfaira)"	2018			Non album-single
"Juju" (with Skerdi)	2018	—	—	Non album-single
"Sari Sari Sari"		—	1	Non album-single
"Mama?" (with MadClip, Ypo and iLLEOo)	2019	—	1	Ka Gu Ras
"Sientelo"	2019		1	Ka Gu Ras
"Ciao Bella" (featuring Mad Clip)	2019		2	Ka Gu Ras
"#31#"	2019		1	Ka Gu Ras
"Comsi Comsa"	2019		3	Ka Gu Ras
"Americana" (featuring iLLEOo)	2019		4	Ka Gu Ras
"Camila"	2019		5	Ka Gu Ras
"Angelina" (featuring Ypo)	2019		3	Ka Gu Ras
"Desole"	2019	—	—	Non album-single
"Meredith" (with Rina)	2019	—	86	MM
"Tentacion" (with Rina)		—	4	MM
"Matrix"(with Rina)	2020			MM
"GG" (with Rina)	2020	—	—	MM
"Sari" (with Rina)	2020	32	52	MM
"Fallin In Love" (with Rina)	2020	—	33	Non album-single
"Rina Rina"	2020	—	—	NosBoss
"Fale"	2021	—	—	One Love
"Bailando"	2021	—	—	Non album-single
"—" denotes a recording that did not chart or was not released in that territory.

==== As featured artist ====
Title	Year	Peak chart positions		Album
Title	Year	ALB	GRE	Album
"Πάγο Στο Λαιμό" (iLLEOo featuring Sin Boy)	2017	—	—	Non-album single
"Ghetto" (MG featuring Sin Boy)	2018	—	—	Non-album single
"Gigi" (Rina featuring Sin Boy)	2018	5	1	Non-album single
"—" denotes a recording that did not chart or was not released in that territory.

==== Other charted songs ====
Title	Year	Peak chart positions	Album
Title	Year	GRE	Album
"Ciao Bella" (featuring Mad Clip)	2019	2	Ka Gu Ras
"Sientelo"	2019	1	Ka Gu Ras
"#31#"	2019	1	Ka Gu Ras
"Comsi Comsa"	2019	3	Ka Gu Ras
"Americana" (featuring iLLEOo)	2019	4	Ka Gu Ras
"Camila"	2019	5	Ka Gu Ras
"Angelina" (featuring Ypo)	2019	3	Ka Gu Ras
"—" denotes a recording that did not chart or was not released in that territory.
