= Dirty Sanchez =

Dirty Sanchez may refer to:

== Television and film ==
- Dirty Sanchez (TV series), a 2003 British television series also known as Team Sanchez
- Dirty Sanchez: The Movie, a 2006 comedy film based on the TV series
- Dirty Sanchez, a character in the film Big Money Rustlas
- Dirty Sanchez, a bar in the film Dodgeball: A True Underdog Story

== Music ==
- Dirty Sanchez (band), an electroclash band from Los Angeles, California
- "Dirty Sanchez", a song by the band Burden Brothers on the album 8 Ball
- "Dirty Sanchez", a song by the band Ghoultown on the album Give 'Em More Rope
- Dirty Sanchez, an album by the band Zeke

== Other ==
- Dirty Sanchez (sexual act), an act associated with coprophilia
