= Ibrahim Tukiçi =

Albanian singer

- Born: 1926; Shkodër, Albania
- Died: 2004 (aged 77–78); Tirana, Albania
- Occupation: Opera singer (tenor)
- Awards: People's Artist

Ibrahim Tukiçi (1926–2004), was an Albanian singer. He was born in Shkodër, Albania. He studied for canto in the Tchaikovsky Conservatory and graduated in 1957. After finishing the studies in 1957 he got a job at the National Theatre of Opera and Ballet of Albania.

He interpreted in many classical operas such as Cavalleria rusticana, Madama Butterfly, and Rigoletto. In his last years of his career he sang in the Albanian operas such as The girl from Kaçanik ("Goca e Kaçanikut"), "Borana", The sold bride ("Nusja e shitur"), "Mrika", Spring ("Pranvera"), The Memory Flower ("Lulja e Kujtimit"), The Wake-Up ("Zgjimi"), ecc.

Tukiçi is known for his peculiar interpretation of popular Albanian songs, such as "Kenke nuri i bukurisë", "Bishtalecat palë-palë", "Hajde gjyle", "Mic Sokoli", etj. For his activity he has received prizes, medals and other titles such as Second Prize in the Festival of Youth in Bucarest in 1953, the Festival of Vienna in 1958, Merited Artist of Albania in 1951 and People's Artist of Albania in 1985.

He is the father of two musicians, Genc and David Tukiçi.

A street in Tirana bears his name today, in his memory.
