= Taip Kadiu =

Taip Kadiu (11 August 1928 - 2013) was an Albanian accordionist and choir conductor.

== Life ==
Taip Kadiu was born in the small town of Kavajë. His passion for the accordion was brought about by his father at an early age. He would later show interest in composition and received his first lessons from the well-known master Gaqo Avrazi. Kadiu joined the Army Ensemble as a chorister in the late 1940s. With the ensemble he participated internationally in tournaments held in the Soviet Union, Romania and Bulgaria. After returning to Albania, he becomes involved in the local orchestra in Durrës where his family had relocated to. In 1965 he would be appointed as the head conductor of the Port Choir, one of the most reputable choirs in the country at the time. He composed music that was performed by talents such as Eqerem Shaqja, Latif Dauti, Xhevdet Maloku and Hamit Dapi.
