= Nezha Alaoui =

Moroccan born entrepreneur and founder of the Mayshad brand

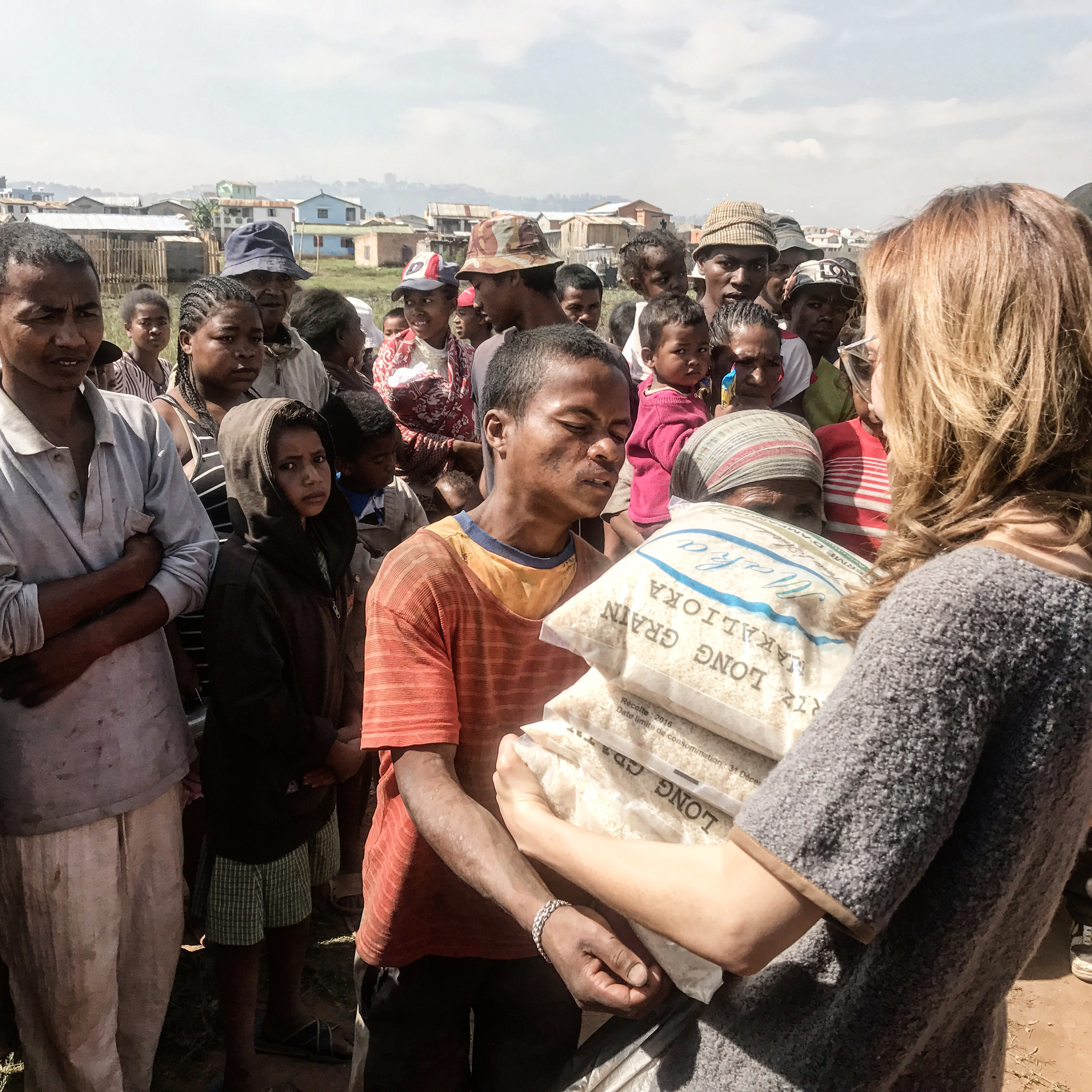
- Born: 1982 (age 43–44); Rabat, Morocco
- Education: Bachelor Degree, Business
- Occupation: Entrepreneur
- Known for: Mayshad brand, Mayshad Foundation, Mayshad Group

Nezha Alaoui is a Moroccan-born entrepreneur and founder of the Mayshad brand. She is also the founder of the Mayshad Foundation, a non-profit organization for youth and women's development.

== Early life and education ==
Alaoui was born in Rabat in 1982. She studied at the French High School in Rabat and continued studies in Tangier at an American school. She later studied hospitality management in Spain where she did a six-month internship that led her to Rome, Milan and London. She received a bachelor's degree in business in London and later studied photography in New York City.

== Career ==
Alaoui began her career as a photographer, commissioned by the United Nations. She won a contract with the World Food Programme to report on UN humanitarian missions throughout the world. In addition to publishing her best photos, she amassed a following on Instagram for her work. Her photos were also displayed at the UN headquarters in Geneva, Vienna, and New York.

Alaoui is the founder of Mayshad, a luxury handbag brand that is known for its social responsibility. The name Mayshad is from the first syllables of her daughters' names. She founded the company in 2011 and opened a boutique in Paris in 2014.

Alaoui has funded and supported programs for education and empowerment of women through the creation of the Mayshad Foundation. The foundation is US-based but operates in Africa. Its work is primarily in line with the Sustainable Development Goals adopted by the United Nations in 2015, which focus on vulnerable women and youth. The foundation has set up co-ops throughout Africa where it assists with training women to become entrepreneurs.

== Publications ==
- Maroc saharien, terre d'inspiration (2013) ISBN 9789954353141
- Emmanuel Dierckx de Casterlé Femmes du Maroc Saharien (2015) ISBN 9789954353141 - illustrations
- Alaoui, Nezha (2019). "Mayshad Group: Connecting Technology with Humanity for the Next Evolution in Social Media". PRWeb.
- In 2018, she wrote and published "Be a leader", a book on the 12 fundamental values of leadership.
