= E Diela Shqiptare =

Albanian Sunday television programme (since 2008)

- Genre: Variety show Marathon show Entertainment
- Created by: Ardit Gjebrea
- Presented by: Ardit Gjebrea
- Country of origin: Albania
- Original language: Albanian

Original release
- Network: TV Klan
- Release: 21 September 2008

E Diela Shqiptare (English: Albanian Sunday) is an Albanian weekly television programme created and hosted by Ardit Gjebrea and broadcast on TV Klan. It airs every Sunday from 13:20 to 19:30.

== Format and segments ==
The programme features a variety of segments combining entertainment, live performances, audience interaction, and social stories. Notable segments include:

- Kam një mesazh për ty: An emotionally driven segment featuring reunions, personal requests, apologies, or surprise gestures intended to create impactful moments between participants.
- Telebingo Shqiptare: A national weekly lottery segment with live draws in the studio and surprise phone calls to viewers, offering prizes.
- Shihemi në gjyq: A dispute-resolution segment where two parties discuss a conflict with a mediator, addressing common social or personal issues, hosted by Eni Çobani.
- Kujdes shëndetin: A segment presenting the latest updates and advice on health and wellness.
- Gjenerata Alfa: Features content and discussions relevant to younger generations.
- Kënga Magjike: Artists participating in the "Kënga Magjike 2024 edition" of the festival present their songs on the show ahead of the semi-final round.
- Post-festival "Kënga Magjike": A follow-up segment where all artists who qualified for the final of the festival are invited to the programme.

== History ==
E Diela Shqiptare premiered on 21 September 2008 on TV Klan. Since its debut, the show has maintained a long-running Sunday marathon format with various segments and special events. Ardit Gjebrea has remained both creator and host throughout the programme's history.
