= Eni Çobani =

Albanian lawyer (born 1972)

- Born: 27 May 1972 (age 54); Libohovë, Gjirokastër, Albania
- Education: University of Tirana
- Occupations: Lawyer; television personality
- Years active: 2000–present
- Television: Shihemi në Gjyq (as part of E Diela Shqiptare)
- Spouse: Avenir Shehu (m. 1997)
- Children: 1

Eni Çobani (born 27 May 1972) is an Albanian lawyer, mediator and television personality. She is known for the programme E Diela Shqiptare, where she has been presenting the Shihemi në Gjyq ("See You in Court") segment since 2011.

== Career ==
Çobani was born in Libohovë within Gjirokastër County in southern Albania. After completing her high studies, she was immediately appointed lecturer at the Faculty of Law of the University of Tirana in the Department of Public Law. She became a lawyer in 1995, and specialized in human rights and international human rights protection programs in multiple universities such as Ancona, Birmingham, Athens, and Bordeaux. Her primary disciplines cover property disputes, civil law and penal law.

Çobani's television debut was in 2000 with her programme Lex & Lex (Latin for "Law and Law") which ran until 2002, however she is primarily known for her performance on TV Klan in the daytime marathon programme E Diela Shqiptare since 2011 in her section "Shihemi në Gjyq" where she solves the conflicts and problems of people.

== Personal life ==
She married Avenir Shehu in 1997. They have a son.
