= SYTË =

Music band

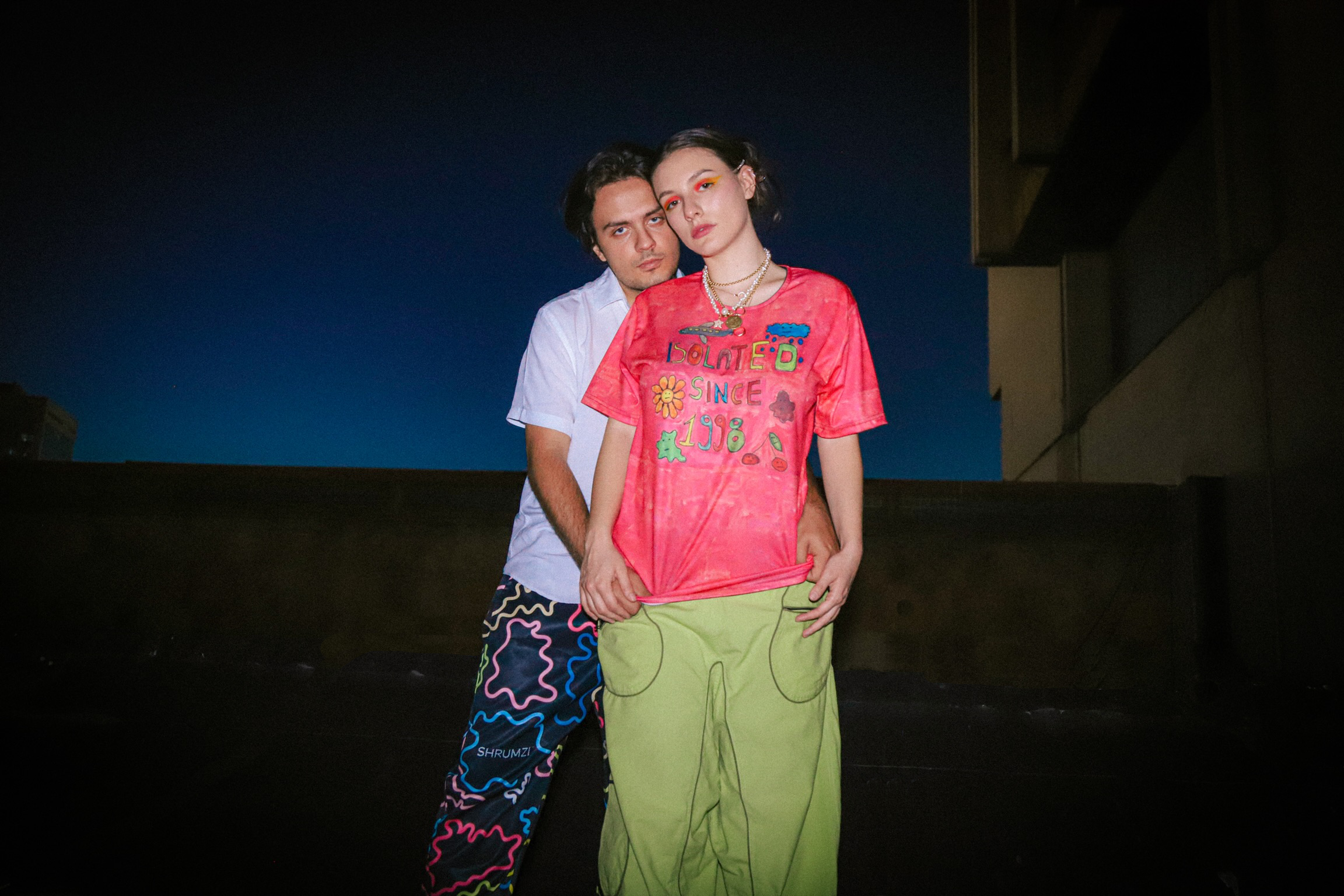

Background information
- Origin: Pristina, Kosovo
- Genres: Indie pop; R&B; alt-pop; neo soul
- Years active: 2018–present
- Members: Nita Kaja; Drin Tashi
- Past members: Fatlind Ferati; Granit Havolli
- Website: https://www.syteband.com/

SYTË is an alt-pop duo based in New York, US, formed by Nita Kaja and Drin Tashi in 2018.

== Biography ==
SYTË (meaning "eyes" in Albanian) was formed in 2018 in Pristina, Kosovo by vocalist Nita Kaja and producer Drin Tashi. The duo soon expanded into a four-piece when Fatlind Ferati and Granit Havolli joined the band. Their first release is their EP, which came out on July 12, 2018.

In 2018, they performed at Sunny Hill Festival, and in 2019 at Pop-Kultur Berlin Festival.

In August 2019 they released their single "Feel It All" and in March, 2020 their single "Tail Light", announcing the release of their album Divine Computer.

The single "The End" was listed on the "Top Awards" Albanian music chart in January 2021.

In April 2021, they collaborated with London-based artist Qendresa, to release their single and music video, "Up in the Air".

In 2022, they released two singles. The single "Where Did The Love Go" in March, and the single "Sirena" in September.

The band moved to New York City at the end of 2022, establishing itself in the music scene by playing at venues such as Baby's All Right, Elsewhere Zone 1, Pianos, and Our Wicked Lady, among others. In 2023, they released three singles: "Bungee Jumping," "Yours For Life," and "I'll Take You." These singles eventually became part of the EP You Know That, Right? which was released on November 3rd, 2023. You Know That, Right? was featured on Spotify playlists "Fresh Finds", "New Pop Picks", and "Good Vibes", and it also landed SYTË on the cover of the playlist "Fresh Finds Pop".

== Influences ==
Band's influences include Solange Knowles, Julian Casablancas, Thundercat, Marvin Gaye, and Radiohead.

== Band members ==
=== Current members ===
- Nita Kaja - vocals
- Drin Tashi - producer, guitars, synths

=== Former members ===
- Fatlind Ferati - bass
- Granit Havolli - drums

== Discography ==
=== Studio albums ===
- Divine Computer (2020)

=== EPs ===
- EP (2018)
- You Know That, Right? (2023)
- PERFECT TIMING (2025)
- ILLUSIONS ARE OVER (2026)

=== Singles ===
- "Feel It All" (2019)
- "Tail Light" (2020)
- "Up in the Air" (2021)
- "Where Did the Love Go" (2022)
- "Sirena" (2022)
- "Bungee Jumping" (2023)
- "Yours for Life" (2023)
- "I'll Take You" (2023)
- "Beat Goes On" (2024)
- "Give Enough" (2024)
- "Stay With Me" (2025)
- "Hate Me Back" (2025)
- "Go Ahead" (2026)
- "What's Ur Sign?" (2026)
- "Give Me a Month" (2026)
