= Orinda Huta =

Albanian singer (born 1987)

- Born: 5 February 1987 (age 38); Tirana, People's Socialist Republic of Albania
- Years active: 2002–present
- Musical career
- Genres: pop
- Occupations: singer, television host
- Instruments: vocals

Orinda Huta (born 5 February 1987) is an Albanian singer and television presenter. She became known in the early 2000s as part of a new generation of pop artists, later building a successful career in Albanian television.

== Early life and education ==
Orinda Huta was born and raised in Tirana, People's Socialist Republic of Albania. Displaying a strong artistic inclination from an early age, she began performing during her adolescence. Her first notable stage appearance took place in 1998, when she performed alongside Flavio Lito with the song “S’kemi tre, po kemi katër”, written by Agim Doçi, with music composed by Ardit Gjebrea. She later participated in the popular talent competition, “Kërkohet një yll”, which helped introduce her to a broader audience. Huta went on to pursue her higher education at the European University of Tirana, where she studied Public Relations and Communication.

== Career ==
=== Music ===
Orinda made her official debut at Kënga Magjike 2002 with the song “Tani e Di”, which quickly became one of her most recognizable hits. She returned to the festival in 2004 with the track “Hi Baby”. Throughout the 2000s, she continued to build her musical repertoire, releasing a number of successful singles such as “Harrova të marr frymë” and “Nisu arratisu”, the latter composed by acclaimed producer, Armend Rexhepagiqi.

In 2014, she released the single “Te amo”, featuring Dominican artist Luis Castro. Her final appearance at Kënga Magjike came with the song “Winnie Winnie Pooh”, after which she gradually transitioned her focus toward a career in television.

=== Television ===
Alongside her singing career, Huta has also built a successful presence in television. In 2013, she hosted the afternoon talk show "Vizioni i pasdites", on Vizion+ and in 2014 served as host of the Miss Shqipëria beauty pageant, held in Ulqin. She later presented the 17th edition of the International Opera Festival “Marie Kraja”, in 2019. The following year, she hosted the popular fashion program "Jo vetëm modë", on Klan TV. Huta currently hosts the podcast "Mam", a production by Folé Publishing, which focuses on motherhood and family-related topics.

== Personal life ==
Orinda Huta is married to Turjan Hysko, a former singer and television host and together they share a daughter.

== Discography ==
=== Singles ===
Year	Song
2002	Tani e Di
2003	Harrova të marr frymë
2004	Hi Baby
2006	Nisu arratisu
2008	Xhan Xhan (feat. The Dreams)
2008	Tradhëtia (feat. Alban Kondi)
2008	Mesnatë
2008	As fejesa, as martesa (feat. NRG Band)
2009	Oqean
2012	Dorëzohem
2012	Jo nuk mundem pa ty
2012	Parajsa (feat. Flori Mumajesi)
2014	Lollipopa (feat. Noizy)
2014	Bang Bang
2014	Te amo (feat. Luis)
2014	Winnie Winnie Pooh
