= Laura Nezha =

Albanian singer, actress, and director

- Born: Laura Nezha; September 16, 1990 (age 35); Fier, Albania
- Education: University of Arts, Albania
- Occupations: Singer; actress; director
- Musical career
- Instruments: Vocals; piano
- Years active: 2003–present
- Label: Stine Records

Laura Nezha (born 16 September 1990) is an Albanian singer, actress, and director.

== Life and career ==
Laura Nezha was born in the city of Fier and moved to the capital Tirana at a very young age. She started singing when she was only five years old in various children events. At twelve years old, she competed in the first season of the talent show "Gjeniu i vogël", where she earned the Third Prize among thousands of contestants from different Albanian-speaking territories. In 2007, she won the First Prize in the RinFest music competition.

Nezha rose to fame after participating in the major musical event Kënga Magjike in 2011, with the song "Jo s'e di", receiving great acclaim from the public. A year later, in 2012, she participated in Top Fest, with the song "Edhe pse gabim".

She graduated from the University of Arts for directing, in 2014. For her thesis, she directed the play True West (Perëndim i vërtetë) in the National Theatre of Albania, which resulted in success. She has acted in numerous theatre plays throughout the years, such as in Les Bonnes, A Streetcar Named Desire, What the Butler Saw, Hamlet, and many more, making theatre her biggest artistic achievement.

In 2016, Laura Nezha participated in the Albanian version of the dancing competition "Dance With Me" where after 15 weeks of different dance numbers, she won the First Prize. In 2017, she voice acted in the Albanian-language version of Moana, where she voiced the titular character. After 6 years, she returned to Kënga Magjike in 2017, with the song "Je dashuri".

== Discography ==
- 2011: Jo s'e di
- 2012: Edhe pse gabim
- 2016: Luv That
- 2017: Je dashuri

== Theatre ==
Year	Title	Role	Theatre
2012	Fernando Krapp hat mir diesen Brief geschrieben (Fernando Krapp më ka shkruar këtë letër) by Tankred Dorst	Julia	National Theatre of Albania
2013	Mirandolina by Bohuslav Martinů	Ortensia	National Theatre of Albania
2013	Three Sisters (Tri motrat) by Anton Chekhov	Maria (Masha)	Tirana Ekspres
2013	No Exit (Me dyer të mbyllura) by Jean-Paul Sartre	Estelle Rigault	National Theatre of Albania
2013	Moulin Rouge! by Baz Luhrmann	Satine	Klan Theatre
2015	Plus vraie que nature (Më e vërtetë se e vërteta) by Martial Courcier	Chloe	Margarita Tutulani Cultural Center
2016	Hamlet by William Shakespeare	Ophelia	Kujtim Spahivogli Theatre
2017	What the Butler Saw (Çfarë pa kryeshërbëtorja) by Joe Orton	Geraldine Barclay	Kujtim Spahivogli Theatre
2017	A Streetcar Named Desire (Tramvaji dëshirë) by Tennessee Williams	Stella Kowalski	Kujtim Spahivogli Theatre
2017	Black Comedy (Komedi në errësirë) by Peter Shaffer	Carol Melkett	Kujtim Spahivogli Theatre
2018	Les Bonnes (Shërbëtoret) by Jean Genet	Claire	Skampa Theatre; Kujtim Spahivogli Theatre
2018	Un dîner d'adieu (Darka e lamtumirës) by Matthieu Delaporte & Alexandre de La Patellière	Clotilde Lecoeur	Kujtim Spahivogli Theatre
2019	The Beauty Queen of Leenane (Mbretëresha e bukurisë nga Leenane) by Martin McDonagh	Maureen Folan	Kujtim Spahivogli Theatre
2019	Antigone (Antigona) by Jean Anouilh	Antigone	Kujtim Spahivogli Theatre
2019	Blackbird (Zogu i zi) by David Harrower	Una	Kujtim Spahivogli Theatre

== Filmography ==
=== Film ===
Year	Title	Role	Notes
2013	Ada	Nurse	
2014	Tirana 14	Denisa	
2016	Hope	?	Short film
2016	Ice Age: Collision Course	Brooke	Albanian voice
2016	Trolls	Poppy	Albanian voice
2016	Moana	Moana	Albanian voice
2017	Foreigner	?	Short film
2019	Toy Story 4	Bo Peep	Albanian voice
2019	Frozen II	Queen Iduna	Albanian voice
2020	Trolls World Tour	Poppy	Albanian voice
2020	Onward	Laurel Lightfoot	Albanian voice
2020	Soul	22	Albanian voice
2022	Puss in Boots: The Last Wish	Goldilocks	Albanian voice

=== Television ===
Year	Title	Role	Notes
2003–2004	Gjeniu i vogël	Herself	Contestant
2011, 2017	Kënga Magjike	Herself	Contestant
2011	Suite PreCure	Hibiki Hojo/Cure Melody	Albanian voice
2012	Top Fest	Herself	Contestant
2012	Portokalli	Student	Special guest
2012	Ben 10	Gwen Tennyson	Albanian voice
2013	DokiDoki! PreCure	Mana Aida/Cure Heart	Albanian voice
2014	Mbrëmje Gala	Herself	Musical guest
2016	Sailor Moon Crystal	Ami Mizuno/Sailor Mercury	Albanian voice
2016	LoliRock	Auriana	Albanian voice
2016	Dance With Me	Herself	Winner of the show
2017	Apartment 2XL	Herself	Special guest

== Awards ==
Gjeniu i vogël

Year	Nominee / work	Award	Result
2004	"Herself"	Third Prize	Won

RinFest

Year	Nominee / work	Award	Result
2007	"Herself"	First Prize	Won

Dance With Me Albania

Year	Nominee / work	Award	Result
2016	"Laura & Renato"	First Main Prize	Won
2016	"Laura & Renato"	6th Night Prize	Won
2016	"Laura & Renato"	12th Night Prize	Won
