= Flaka Goranci =

Kosovan opera singer

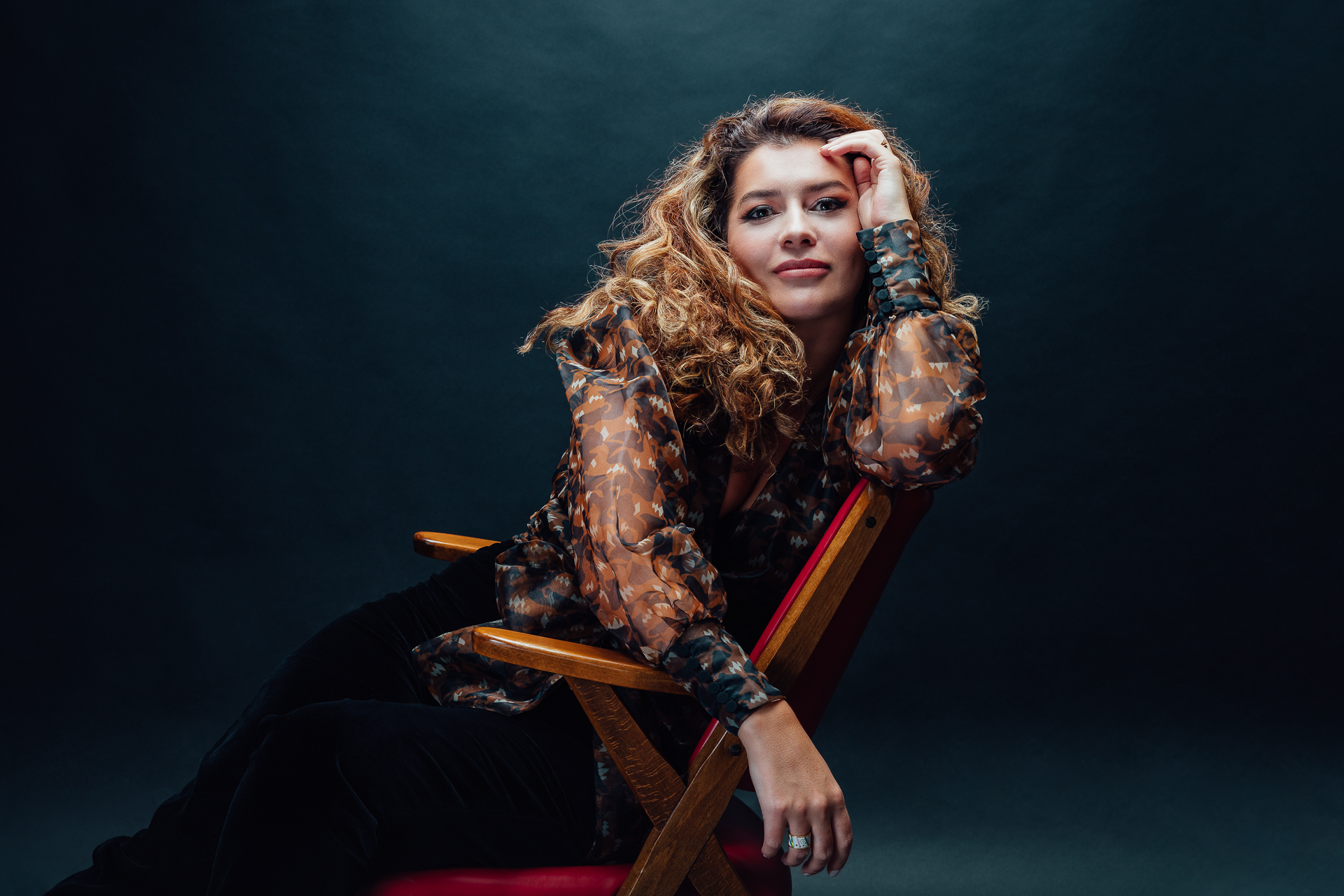
- Born: Gjakova, Kosovo
- Occupation: Mezzo-soprano

Flaka Goranci (born in Gjakova-Kosovo) is a Kosovo-Austrian Mezzo-soprano.

== Early life ==
Flaka Goranci was born in Gjakove, Kosovo to Flamur Goranci an Electrical engineer and a mother Doctor of Endocrinology and Internist Ilirjana Hana Goranci. At an early age she started studying Piano at her home town in Gjakova and as 9 years old she won the kids singing contest Zeri me i bukur femijeror.

== Education and career ==
She studied opera singing at the University of Arts (Tirana) in Albania and after she continued her master studies at the Buchmann-Mehta School of Music at Tel Aviv University in Israel. Goranci began her international career after moving to Vienna. She worked with Nicolaus Harnoncourt, Gustav Kuhn, Ulrich Windfuhr, Pawel Poplawski, Enrico Delamboye, Manfred Mayrhofer, among others. With opera directors like Uwe Eric Laufenberg, Stephen Lawless, Carlos Wagner, Niv Hoffman, Andrea Zogg, Ulrich Schulz, Dani Ehrlich and Michal Grover Friedlander. She performed with Hamburg Symphony Orchestra, Concentus Musicus Wien, Dubrovnik Symphony Orchestra, Kosovo Philharmonic, Macedonian philharmonic Orchestra, Albanian Symphonic Orchestra and more. She has performed at Vienna Konzerthaus, Vienna Musikverein, Theater an der Wien, Philharmonie Berlin, Konzerthaus Berlin, Magdeburg Theatre, National Moravian-Silesian Theatre, Vatroslav Lisinski Concert Hall, among others.

== Repertoire ==
Her repertoire includes roles of Carmen Carmen, Charlotte Werther, Maria Maria de Buenos Aires a tango opera by Astor Piazzolla Jenny Die Dreigroschenoper, Dido Dido and Aeneas, Cherubino Le Nozze Di Figaro, Dorabella Così fan tutte, Rosina Il Barbiere di Siviglia, Olga Eugene Onegin (opera), Venus Tannhäuser, Amneris Aida, Ulrica Un ballo in maschera, Third wood sprite Rusalka (opera), among others. Her Lied repertoire includes also works by Gustav Mahler, Alma Mahler, Robert Schumann, Clara Schumann, Maurice Ravel, Richard Strauss, Luciano Berio, Kurt Weill and more.

== Discography ==
Despite her operatic and concert career she has been engaged as a singer but also as a Producer and Composer in both her CD projects. In 2015 her first CD Albanian Flowers with rearranged old songs from Albania and Kosovo was released by Gramola in Vienna. Her second CD La Femme A Journey of Female Composers was produced in 2022 by Naxos. This cultural/diplomatic album which brings the stories and music of Women Composers from Middle East to Balkans, South America, South Africa and European countries as well, reached an international attention and was nominated in three categories by Opus Klassik in Berlin in 2023 - The best singer of the year, Klassik ohne Grenzen and The Best Video with The Window
