= Yllka Kuqi =

Kosovar singer (born 1982)

- Born: 26 November 1982 (age 43); Gjakova, SFR Yugoslavia (present-day Kosovo)
- Genres: Pop
- Instrument: Voice
- Spouse: Astrit Pallaska

Yllka Kuqi (born 26 November 1982) is a Kosovar singer.

In 2005, she entered the sixth edition of the Kënga Magjike competition with the song "Dhe të dua" ("And I Love You"). Those finals were held on 23 January, for the first time on Kosovo soil in Pristina, and she placed second, behind Irma Libohova and ahead of Pirro Çako. She also won a "Best Vocalist" award there. In 2006, she placed eighth with 95 points for "Më merr" ("Take Me"), just ahead of Rona Nishliu. Armend Rexhepagiqi won with 293 points, just ahead of Ledina Çelo, but Kuqi was again awarded a consolation prize, this time for "Best Melody".

Kuqi has also participated in the Festivali i Këngës, entering in 2005 with the song "Të gjeta" ("I Found You"). She made the second semi-final on 17 December, but was eliminated before the finale the next day.

Her most notable song is Hajde luj qyqek with Ylli Demaj.

== Sources ==
- Tekste Shqip
