= Sanches =

Sanches is a Portuguese surname. The Spanish version of this name is Sánchez. Notable people with the surname include:

- Afonso Sanches (1289–1329), Portuguese nobleman
- Alvyn Sanches (born 2003), Swiss footballer
- António Nunes Ribeiro Sanches (1699–1783), Portuguese physician and philosopher
- Brian Sanches (born 1978), American baseball player
- Francisco Sanches (c.1550–1623), Portuguese-Galician philosopher
- Giovanni Sanches (born 1991), Brazilian politician
- Manuel Estêvão Sanches (born 1979), Portuguese-Cape Verdean footballer
- Renato Sanches (born 1997), Portuguese footballer
- Simon Sanches, Dutch navy nurse and laboratory technician who planned to commit a coup d'état in Suriname
