= Genta Ismajli =

Kosovan singer

- Born: Gentiana Ismajli; Gjilan, SFR Yugoslavia
- Origin: Kosovo
- Genres: Pop; R&B; dance
- Occupations: Singer; songwriter
- Years active: 2003–present
- Label: Bzzz Entertainment
- Website: www.gentaismajli.com

Gentiana Ismajli, known professionally as Genta Ismajli, is an American-Kosovan singer and songwriter.

== Career ==
Ismajli was born in Gjilan to an Albanian family. Before Genta was born, they moved to Gjilan. A few months after her birth, her parents moved to Chicago, Illinois in the United States, where she was raised. At the age of 19, she went to Kosovo and released the single "Dridhem". The song became a hit, and she relocated permanently to Kosovo. She won Kënga Magjike in 2005 with the song "S'dua tjetër" composed by Adrian Hila, an Albanian composer, receiving 292 points. Ismajli continued her career in Albania and Kosovo for three more years. She then went back to the United States to spend some time with her parents, and came back to Albania with new projects in mind.

Ismajli sings mostly commercial pop songs, similar to other Balkan pop. She participated in the first edition of Dancing with the Stars (Albania), where she ranked second overall.

She began singing in English, recording songs that were released in her 2008 album, her first all-English album. The majority of the songs on the album were written by American songwriter Kara DioGuardi.

She released a half English, half Albanian album in 2011 entitled Guximi. Her English songs included "One Shot", "Accident", "Something to Remember Me By", "Idolize Me", "Intoxicated", "Choose", and her debut English single, "Planet Me", written and produced by Kara DioGuardi.

== Discography ==
=== Albums ===
- Mos më Shiko (2004)
1. Pranoje
2. Pse Nuk Vallëzoni?
3. Unë të Dua
4. Mos më Shiko
5. Melodi Pa Fund
1. Dridhem
- Më e Fortë Jam Unë (2005)
1. Unë Jam Fati Yt
2. Për Ty Jam e Vdekur
3. Zor Me Mu' e Keq Pa Mu'
4. Pse të Dua Ty
5. M'puq, M'puq
6. S'do të Pres
7. M'u Largo
8. Gabova
9. Luj Me Mu
- Posesiv (2006)
1. Një Lutje
2. Posesiv
3. Nuk Harrohet
4. Hajde Bukuri
5. Shko
6. Largohu
7. E Kam Shpirtin Eksplosiv
8. Fjalë Me Bisht
9. Lutem
10. Me Hare
- Zero Zero (2008)
1. Një Her' në Vit
2. S'dua t'jem e Tjetër Kujt
3. Zero Zero
4. E Pamundur
5. Qeni që Leh
6. Sa Ilaqe
7. Relax
8. Jan's Picikato
- Guximi (2011)
1. Guximi
2. One Shot
3. Hajde, Qka po Pret
4. Pa Ty
5. Pini Sonte
6. Pse Ike?
7. Mos u Ndal
8. Accident
9. Number One (Remix)
10. Shkune Tune (Remix)
- Guximi (Bonus Tracks Version) (2011)
1. Guximi
2. One Shot
3. Hajde, Qka po Pret
4. Pa Ty
5. Pini Sonte
6. Pse Ike?
7. Mos u Ndal
8. Accident
9. Something to Remember Me By
10. Idolize Me
11. Choose
12. Intoxicated
13. Planet Me
14. Something to Remember Me By (Remix)
15. Number One (Remix)
16. Shkune Tune (Remix)
17. Outro

=== Compilation albums ===
- Dekada (2014)

== Awards and nominations ==
Kënga Magjike

Year	Nominee / work	Award	Result
2005	"Nuk Dua Tjeter"	First Prize	Won
2005	"Nuk Dua Tjeter"	Internet Prize	Won
2014	"Maje"	Best Performer	Won

Kult Awards

Year	Nominee / work	Award	Result
2009	"Zero Zero"	Best Album of the Year	Nominated

Netet e Klipit Shqiptar

Year	Nominee / work	Award	Result
2006	"Pse të dua ty"	Best Video / First Prize	Won

Poli Fest

Year	Nominee / work	Award	Result
2006	"Me hare"	Internet Prize	Won
2006	"Me hare"	Public Prize	Won
2006	"Me hare"	Second Prize	Won

Video Fest Awards

Year	Nominee / work	Award	Result
2005	"Pranoje"	Best Female	Nominated
2005	"Pranoje"	Best Popular Video	Nominated
2006	"Luj me mu"	Best Popular Video	Won
2006	"Luj me mu"	Best Production	Nominated
2006	"Pse te du"	Best Female	Nominated
2006	"Pse te du"	Best Camera	Nominated
2006	"Pse te du"	Best Director	Nominated
2007	"Posesiv"	Best Female	Nominated
2008	"Sa llaqe"	Best Pop Folk Video	Won
2010	"Si panter I zi"	Best Performance	Nominated
2012	"Guximi (ft.Dalool)"	Best Dance	Nominated
2012	"Guximi (ft.Dalool)"	RTV 21 PLUS Prize	Won
2013	"Ole Ole(ft.Dj Blunt & Real 1)"	Best Dance	Nominated
2014	"Anuloje"	Best Pop Folk Video	Nominated

Zhurma Show Awards

Year	Nominee / work	Award	Result
2008	"Një Herë Në Vit"	Best Pop & Rock Video	Won
2008	"Një Herë Në Vit"	Top 10 Vip	Won
2009	"Si Panter I Zi"	Best Pop Video	Won
2010	"Shkune Tune"	Best Video / First Prize	Won
2010	"Shkune Tune"	Best Pop	Won
2011	""Guximi (ft.Dalool)"	Best Dance	Won
2011	""Guximi (ft.Dalool)"	Best Album	Nominated
2011	""Guximi (ft.Dalool)"	Best Song	Nominated
2012	"Ole Ole (ft. DJ Blunt & Real 1)"	Best Video / First Prize	Nominated
2012	"Ole Ole (ft. DJ Blunt & Real 1)"	Best Song	Nominated
2013	"Si ty nuk ka"	Best Pop	Nominated
2013	"Si ty nuk ka"	Best Video / First Prize	Nominated
2014	"Anuloje"	Best Female	Nominated
2014	"Anuloje"	Best Pop	Nominated
2016	"Shake it (ft.Etnon)"	Best Collaboration	Won
2016	"Shake it (ft.Etnon)"	Best Song	Nominated
