= Irma Libohova =

Albanian singer (born 1959)

- Born: 14 April 1959 (age 66); Tirana, People's Socialist Republic of Albania
- Years active: 1971–present
- Children: 1
- Relatives: Eranda Libohova
- Musical career
- Genres: folk; light
- Occupation: singer
- Instruments: vocals

Irma Libohova (born 14 April 1959) is an Albanian singer known for her contributions to popular music, with a career spanning more than five decades. She gained prominence through her many appearances at Albania's national song festivals, winning Festivali i Këngës in 1983 with "Zgjodha njeriun" and again in 1987 with "Nuk e harroj". She later continued her success at Kënga Magjike, winning in 2000 with "1001 endërra" and in 2004 with "Prapë tek ti do vij".

== Early life and education ==
Irma Libohova was born in Tirana on 14 April 1959, to a family originally from Libohovë. She studied music at the Jordan Misja Artistic Lyceum, one of the country's main institutions for professional arts education. An early exposure to structured musical training contributed to her later development as a vocalist. She made her first stage appearance in 1971 with the song Gabimi i Mirelës.

== Career ==
Libohova emerged during a period that produced a prominent generation of Albanian vocalists who helped define the country’s popular music landscape in the late 20th century. Her body of work reflects the spirit of festival music, blending accessible melodies with lyrics that are suited to her vocal range. She has emphasized that while each musical era produces notable artistic achievements, it also generates less enduring material, with time ultimately determining their artistic value.

Some of her notable hits include Duhemi si motra (1988), Veç një herë jetojmë (1990), Horoskop (1991), Dy shoqe ne (1995), Gjethet e shtatorit (1996), Stop (2012), Kë do doje ti (2016), Tango dashurie (2019), etc.

In recent years, Libohova has remained professionally active, participating in concerts and musical events such as Diva, Maratona e Këngës Popullore and the musical tribute Koncert për Adelën.

== Personal life ==
Irma Libohova has four sibblings. Her younger sister, Eranda, is also a singer with whom she has collaborated in festivals and musical projects over the years. She was married to actor and comedian, Besnik Kaso, who died on 17 March 2017.

== Discography ==
=== Albums ===
| Year | Title |
|---|---|
| 1991 | RTSH |
| 1995 | A.K. |
| 1997 | 23...53 |
| 2000 | Napoloni |
| 2003 | Mollaxhiu |
| 2003 | Aroma e vendit tim |
| 2005 | Shamia e beqarit |
| 2005 | Këngët e shekullit |
| 2006 | Preke hundën, preke... |
| 2010 | Pranga malli |
| 2023 | Veri Jug |
| 2023 | Për fëmijët |
| 2023 | Fillim pa mbarim |
| 2023 | Këngë moj |

=== Festivali i Këngës ===
| Year | Song | Result |
|---|---|---|
| 1978 | "Çel kjo tokë si trëndafil" | — |
| 1979 | "Më dhe dritë nga syri yt" | — |
| 1980 | "Njerëzit e agimeve" | — |
| 1981 | "Nusja e maleve" | — |
| 1982 | "Kur zemrat rrahin si një zemër" | — |
| 1983 | "Zgjodha njeriun" | 1st |
| 1984 | "Pranë të ndjej kudo" | — |
| 1984 | "Këndon e gjithë Shqipëria" | — |
| 1985 | "Kur vij tek ti" | — |
| 1986 | "Ku vajti vallë ai djalë" | — |
| 1987 | "Nuk e harroj" | 1st |
| 1987 | "Shoqe të një udhe" | — |
| 1988 | "Të kërkoj" | — |
| 1988 | "Jeto rininë" | — |
| 1989 | "Emrin ty kush s’ta di" | — |
| 1990 | "Veç njëherë jetojmë" | — |
| 1990 | "Apokalips" | — |
| 1991 | "Horoskop" | — |
| 1992 | "Mos psherëti" | — |
| 1996 | "Hiqni maskat" | — |
| 1997 | "Lady D" | — |
| 1998 | "Gjethe shtatori" | — |
| 2000 | "Ishulli im" | — |
| 2001 | "Taverna e vjetër" | — |

=== Kënga Magjike ===
| Year | Song | Result |
|---|---|---|
| 1999 | "Lëvizje" (feat. Kristi Popa) | — |
| 2000 | "1001 Ëndërra" | 1st |
| 2004 | "Prapë tek ti do vij" | 1st |
