= Ardit Gjebrea =

Albanian TV presenter and producer (born 1963)

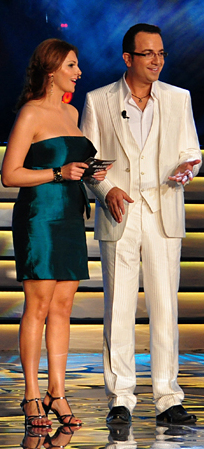
- Gjebrea (right) at Kënga Magjike in 2009
- Born: 7 June 1963 (age 63); Tirana, Albania
- Occupations: Singer, songwriter, producer, presenter
- Children: Joni Gjebrea, Anna Gjebrea
- Relatives: Ramize Gjebrea

Ardit Gjebrea (born 7 June 1963) is an Albanian television presenter, singer-songwriter and producer, best known as the producer and host of the Sunday program E Diela Shqiptare and the annual music competition Kënga Magjike, both broadcast on TV Klan.

== Life and career ==
Gjebrea began singing at the age of five in Albanian children festivals, he was awarded prizes at local competitions for interpreting songs by Avni Mula such as "I ëmbël zëri i gjyshës" and "Kur këndoj për ty moj nënë" in the 1970s.

His first composition "E Shtrenjta Toka Ime" was interpreted by Liljana Kondakçi and the text was written by Radio Television Albania (RTSH) editor Zhuljana Jorganxhiu during the Spring Festival of 1987, although no surviving copy of the recording is publicly available according to researcher Nicolas Tochka.

On 17 December 2001, he made a breakthrough in his career, winning the Festivali i Këngës në RTSH prize with the song "Ika Larg". In 2005, he won the same prize with his song "Trëndelinë dhe këngë".

Gjebrea has released three albums throughout his career, beginning with the eponymous album Ardit Gjebrea in 2001. In 2005, he released Projekt Jon, a best-selling album in Albania. Projekt Jon showcased Gjebrea's artistic range as he merged influences of Albanian traditional music, Balkanic and Mediterranean sounds and instruments, as well as recent trends in international music. In 2005 he released "Trëndelinë dhe këngë".

Gjebrea has held some 250 concerts in Albania, as well as performances in the US, Canada, Germany, United Kingdom, Greece, Romania, Turkey, Italy, Belgium and China.

His daughter, Anna Gjebrea, represented Albania in the Junior Eurovision Song Contest 2021. She also hosted the 2025 edition of Kënga Magjike alongside him.

=== Career as a presenter and producer ===
Throughout his career, Gjebrea has presented and produced several TV shows including the Albanian TeleBingo, several editions of the annual Miss & Mister Albania, Dua më shumë Shqipërinë, Rokoloko, and Krishtlindje në Tiranë.

In 2011, Gjebrea was host of the Miss Europe Contest, held that year in Albania. In 2016, he hosted the 19th edition of the "Miss Model of the World" contest held in China.

=== Kënga Magjike ===
Every year, in a process starting in June and ending in November, Gjebrea, through his production house JonMusic and in cooperation with Klan TV, finalizes production on Kënga Magjike, a festival of the contemporary music for artists from Albania, Kosovo, North Macedonia and Montenegro. The first Kenga Magjike was produced in 1999, and the last edition took place in November 2016. Kënga Magjike is broadcast live in Albania by Klan TV, Ora News and STV, in Kosovo by RTV21, in Macedonia by Alsat and across the Balkans by the Bulgarian network Ballkanika Music Television.

=== E Diela Shqiptare ===
Since 2008, Gjebrea is the producer and host of E Diela Shqiptare (The Albanian Sunday), a Sunday afternoon show. E Diela Shqiptare includes debates, ballet, live music, performances, guests, sport results, and games.

== Awards and nominations ==
Festivali i Këngës

Year	Nominee / work	Award	Result
2001	"Ika Larg"	First place	Won
2005	"Trëndelinë dhe këngë"	First place	Won
2007	"E para letër"	First place/As Singer	Won
2008	"Nuk mund të marrësh"	First place/As Producer and writer	Won

Kult Awards

Year	Nominee / work	Award	Result
2006	"Rreth zjarrit tënd"	Album of the Year	Won

Videofest

Year	Nominee / work	Award	Result
2005	"Hëna"	Best Male Video	Won
2005	"Hëna"	The Most Popular Video	Won

Zhurma Show Awards

Year	Nominee / work	Award	Result
2010	"Do ta them"	Best Song	Won
2010	"Do ta them"	Best Album	Won
