= Kënga Magjike =

Music competition in Albania

- The official logo of Kënga Magjike
- Genre: Various
- Dates: November, December, May
- Locations: Albania (1999–present); Kosovo (2004–present)
- Years active: 1999–present
- Founders: Ardit Gjebrea
- Capacity: TV Klan; Vizion Plus
- Website: Official Website

Kënga Magjike (Albanian pronunciation: [ˈkəŋɡa maˈɟikɛ]; transl. "The Magic Song") is an annual music competition organised by the Albanian television broadcaster Televizioni Klan & Vizion Plus. The music competition has been broadcasting annually since its inauguration in 1999 with the exception of 2020 and 2023.

The first edition of the contest was broadcast live by Radio Televizioni Shqiptar while all the editions from 2003 by Televizioni Klan. Ardit Gjebrea has been the main presenter of the contest since the first edition and in other occasions he has hosted with other co-presenters amongst them Brigitte Nielsen, Natalia Estrada, Songül Öden and Elia Zogu.

== History ==
=== 1999–2005 ===
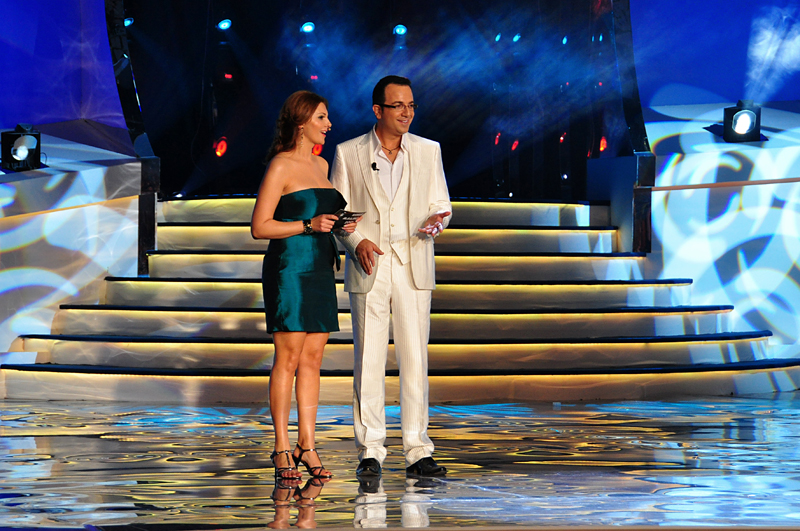
Ardit Gjebrea at Kënga Magjike 2009

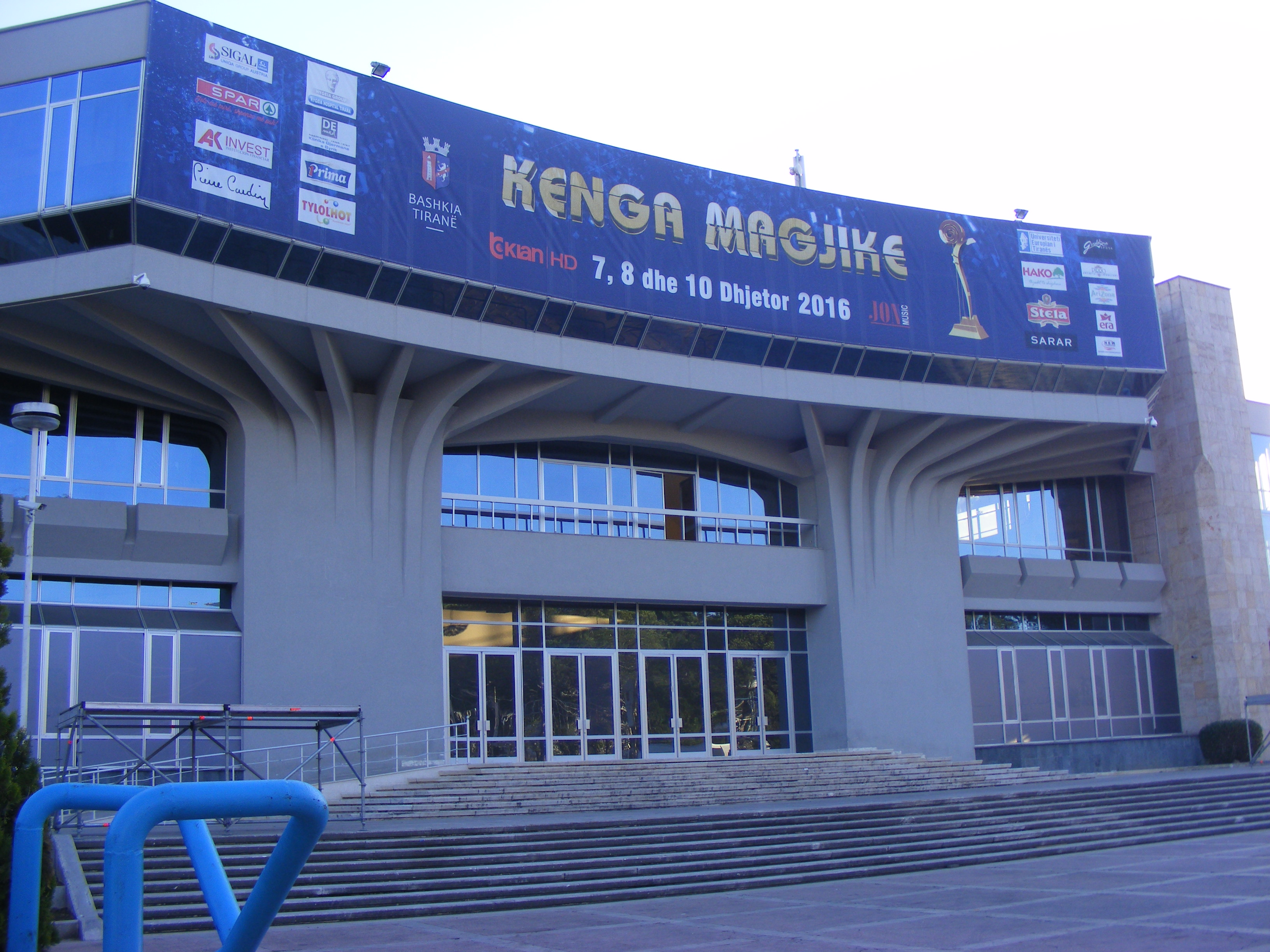
Banner at the Palace of Congresses where Kënga Magjike 2016 was held

Throughout its history, different broadcasters have been credited with the production and airing of this event, including RTSH, Klan TV, TVA, RTV NRG (Albania) and RTV21, RTK (Kosovo), as well as many radio stations. It is currently produced and aired by Klan TV.

Kënga Magjike was created by singer, composer, host and organizer Ardit Gjebrea and began airing in 1999. It usually airs each November, with a few exceptions. It was originally aired as a three or four night event similar to Festivali i Këngës; however, in 2005 a new format of presenting the songs was introduced. Each song was broadcast one month prior to the semi-finals and the final in a special edition called "Duke Pritur Kënga Magjike..." (Awaiting Kënga Magjike...), giving the viewers a chance to vote for the songs that would pass on to the semi-finals through phone, text or online in the festival's official website. A jury was also used when determining which songs made it to the next stage.

=== 2006–present ===
This format was later replaced by the current system, where groups of songs are presented weekly in the E Diela Shqiptare (The Albanian Sunday) show on Klan TV hosted by Ardit Gjebrea. Established singers automatically pass to the semi-finals stage, while newcomers must rely on the verdict of a professional jury. Once the semi-finalists are determined and their acts are performed in the semis, it is the singers themselves who must vote for each other in a 1-through-30 (skipping 23, 25, 27, 28 and 29) point system to determine both the songs that will reach the finals and their final ranking. The professional jury, the organizers of the festival and the TV station are tasked with determining the titles of the prizes that each finalist will be awarded.

Following criticism for the use of playback in the delivery of songs, the organizers decided to limit the use of playback to just the weekly presentation stage in 2015. Established singers are allowed to use playback in this phase, while newcomers must sing live in order to receive a verdict by the jury. Nonetheless, the semi-finals and the final must all be delivered live by both established and debuting singers.

The festival has been praised for the diversity of music it has brought to the public, providing a great mixture of singers and bands from Albania with those from neighboring countries, a large portion coming from Kosovo, North Macedonia, Montenegro and other areas. Kënga Magjike has also been the stage for many comebacks of famous Albanian singers that reside in other countries, as well as artists which have contributed to the Albanian music industry in the past. Songs from this contest have resulted in numerous memorable hits for Albanians throughout the world. Compared to its main competitors, Kënga Magjike features more bubble-gum and commercialized music, contrasting with the predominantly alternative and rock genres featured in Top Awards on Top Channel, while not being as exclusively prohibitive as Festivali i Këngës, which typically admits only professional vocalists.

Presenter Ardit Gjebrea announced that the competition would be postponed in 2020 and would return in 2021. The competition was also not held in 2023.

== Winners ==
As the second longest-running music competition in Albania, twenty songs have won the Kënga Magjike which has been broadcast every year since its debut in 1999. The festival's winner has been determined using numerous voting techniques throughout its history while centre to these have been the awarding of points to the participants by juries, televoters or the participants themselves.

Year	Song	Artist(s)	Composition	Ref
1999	"Vetëm një fjalë"	Elsa Lila	Alfred Kaçinari; Jorgo Papingji	
2000	"Një mijë ëndrra"	Irma Libohova and Eranda Libohova	Irma Libohova; Kristi	
2001	"Për një çast më ndali zemra"	Rovena Dilo and Pirro Çako	Pirro Çako; Timo Flloko	
2002	"E pathëna fjalë"	Mira Konçi	Pandi Laço; Shpëtim Saraçi	
2003	"Ku je ti"	Ema Bytyçi	Adrian Hila	
2004	"Prapë tek ti do të vij"	Irma Libohova	Floran Kondi; Irma Libohova	
2005	"Nuk dua tjetër"	Genta Ismajli	Adrian Hila	
2006	"Kur dashuria vdes"	Armend Rexhepagiqi	Aida Baraku; Armend Rexhepagiqi	
2007	"Hape veten"	Aurela Gaçe	Flori Mumajesi; Timo Flloko	
2008	"Njëri nga ata"	Jonida Maliqi	Aida Baraku; Kaliopi	
2009	"Rruga e zemrës"	Eliza Hoxha and Rosela Gjylbegu	Darko Dimitrov; Eliza Hoxha	
2010	"Sa e shite zemrën"	Juliana Pasha and Luiz Ejlli	Pirro Çako	
2011	"Më lër të fle"	Redon Makashi	Redon Makashi	
2012	"Rrefuzoj"	Alban Skenderaj	Alban Skenderaj	
2013	"Tatuazh në zemër"	Besa	Alban Skenderaj; Darko Dimitrov	
2014	"Pa kontroll"	Aurela Gaçe and Young Zerka	Adrian Hila	
2015	"Akoma jo"	Aurela Gaçe	Adrian Hila	
2016	"Ma thuaj ti"	Rozana Radi	Elgit Doda; Rozana Radi	
2017	"E çmendur"	Anxhela Peristeri	Kledi Bahiti; Olti Curri	
2018	"Plas"	Flori Mumajesi	Flori Mumajesi	
2019	"Ma zgjat dorën"	Eneda Tarifa	Flori Mumajesi	
2020	Contest postponed			
2021	"Thikat e mia"	Alban Ramosaj	Alban Ramosaj	
2022	"I paftuar"	Marsela Çibukaj	Alban Ramosaj	
2023	Contest postponed			
2024	"Akoma"	Rozana Radi and Sany Dimitri	Rozana Radi and Sany Dimitri	
2025	"Ajër"	Juliana Pasha	Filloreta Raçi, Jeris Kaso	

== Recurring winners ==
In the 25 year history of the contest, only four singers have won Kënga Magjike more than once. Aurela Gaçe is the most successful performer with three victories, two of them in a row in 2014 and 2015. Other three singers won the contest twice.

Artist	Victories	Years
Aurela Gaçe	3	2007; 2014; 2015
Irma Libohova	2	2000; 2004
Juliana Pasha	2	2010; 2025
Rozana Radi	2	2016; 2024

== See also ==
- Festivali i Këngës
