= List of Albanian actors =

This is a list of actors from Albania, a country in Europe's Balkan Peninsula. The chronological list by year of birth also includes actors from Kosovo, Montenegro, North Macedonia and select actors of Albanian ancestry from around the world.

== Male actors ==
- Aleksandër Moisiu (1879–1935)
- Pjetër Gjoka (1912–1982)
- Sandër Prosi (1920–1985)
- Pandi Raidhi (1921–1999)
- Naim Frashëri (1923–1975)
- Kadri Roshi (1924–2007)
- Sulejman Pitarka (1924–2007)
- Ndrek Luca (1927–1995)
- Luan Qerimi (1929–2018)
- Skënder Sallaku (1935–2014)
- Bekim Fehmiu (1936–2010)
- Albert Vërria (1936–2015)
- Dhimitër Orgocka (1936–2021)
- Reshat Arbana (1940)
- Robert Ndrenika (1942)
- Agim Shuka (1942–1992)
- Aleko Prodani (1942–2006)
- Andon Qesari (1942–2021)
- Faruk Begolli (1944–2007)
- Llazi Sërbo (1945–2010)
- Bujar Lako (1946–2016)
- Roland Trebicka (1947–2013)
- Vasillaq Vangjeli (1948–2011)
- John Belushi (1949–1982)
- Agim Qirjaqi (1950–2010)
- Esat Teliti (1950)
- Edmond Budina (1952)
- Enver Petrovci (1954–2025)
- James Belushi (1954)
- Ndriçim Xhepa (1957)
- Peter Malota (1959)
- James Biberi (1965)
- Ilir Jaçellari (1970)
- Laert Vasili (1974)
- Orli Shuka (1976)
- Agim Kaba (1980)
- Blerim Destani (1981)
- Nickola Shreli (1981)
- Nik Xhelilaj (1983)
- Victor Gojcaj (1983)
- Can Yaman (1989)

== Female actors ==
- Marie Logoreci (1920–1988)
- Liza Vorfi (1924–2011)
- Violeta Manushi (1926–2007)
- Drita Pelingu (1926–2013)
- Esma Agolli (1928–2010)
- Melpomeni Çobani (1928–2016)
- Margarita Xhepa (1932–2025)
- Tinka Kurti (1932)
- Ferial Alibali (1933–2011)
- Melihate Ajeti (1935–2005)
- Antoneta Papapavli (1938–2013)
- Yllka Mujo (1953)
- Rajmonda Bulku (1958)
- Luli Bitri (1976)
- Masiela Lusha (1985)
- Ana Golja (1996)
- Flonja Kodheli (unknown)

== See also ==
- List of Albanian films
- List of Albanians
