= List of Muhaxhir Albanians =

This is a list of Muhaxhir Albanians that includes Albanians and Muslims that left their homes as refugees or were transferred from various States in Balkan to Albania and Kosovo. The list is sorted by the fields or occupations in which the notable individual has maintained the most influence.

== History and politics ==
- Nexhmije Hoxha – Albanian Communist politician
- Kostandin Boshnjaku – Albanian banker, politician, diplomat
- Murad Toptani – Albanian poet, artist and activist of the Albanian National Awakening
- Koçi Xoxe – Albanian politician
- Javer Hurshiti – Albanian military and political figure
- Musine Kokalari – Albanian prose writer and politician
- Adem Grabovci – Kosovar-Albanian politician and a secretary of the Democratic Party of Kosovo
- Glauk Konjufca – Albanian politician
- Ramiz Alia – Albanian politician
- Lulzim Basha – Albanian politician
- Shpëtim Idrizi – Albanian politician
- Elia, Crown Princess of Albania – Albanian actress, former singer and wife of Leka II, Crown Prince of Albania
- Eqrem Çabej – Albanian historical linguist and scholar
- Sherif Ahmeti - Albanian teacher, imam, and commentator and translator of the Quran into Albanian

== Arts and Entertainment ==
- Marie Kraja – Albanian singer
- Musine Kokalari – Albanian prose writer
- Tefta Tashko-Koço – Albanian singer and soprano
- Lola Gjoka – Albanian pianist
- Yllka Mujo – Albanian actress
- Rona Nishliu – Albanian Kosovar singer and songwriter
- Tinka Kurti – Albanian actress
- Xhesika Berberi – Albanian model

== Business ==
- Gazmend Demi – Albanian businessman who is the current president of Partizani.
- Enver Sekiraqa – former Albanian businessman and criminal.
- Armand Duka – Businessman and head of the Albanian Football Association

== Sport ==
- Milot Rashica – Kosovo-Albanian footballer
- Andin Rashica- Kosovar Albanian basketball coach
- Valdrin Rashica- Kosovo-Albanian footballer
- Ermir Lenjani – Albanian footballer
- Edon Zhegrova – Albanian footballer
- Bajram Jashanica – Kosovo-Albanian footballer
- Leart Paqarada – Kosovo-Albanian footballer
- Liridon Kalludra – Kosovo-Albanian footballer
- Granit Xhaka – Swiss-Albanian footballer
- Taulant Xhaka – Albanian footballer
- Anel Rashkaj – Kosovo-Albanian footballer
- Giovanni Paramithiotti - was an Italian sporting director. He was one of the founders and first chairman of the football club Internazionale Milano (1908–1909). His family were from Çamëria, Paramythia hence his surname.
- Leonard Pllana – Kosovo-Albanian footballer
