= Albanian opera =

Music genre

The Albanian opera includes the art of opera in Albania and opera in the Albanian language.

== History ==
The opera began being performed as a musical genre in Albania in the second half of the 20th century. The first Albanian opera was Mrika by Prenkë Jakova, which was put on stage in 1958 at the Migjeni Theatre in Shkoder, Albania, and, a year later, at the venue of the Academy of Arts of Tirana. Other operas that followed were The Spring by Tish Daija, The Flower of Memory by Kristo Kono, and The Heroines by Vangjo Nova. Later operas include Skënderbeu (transl. Skanderbeg) by Prenkë Jakova, Bijtë e Skënderbeut (transl. Skanderbeg's sons) by Abdulla Grimci, Komisari (transl. The commissary) by Nikolla Zoraqi, Zgjimi (transl. The rise) by Tonin Harapi, and Toka e jonë (transl. Our land), by Pjetër Gaci.

In 2003 the National Theatre of Kosovo premiered its first Albanian opera, the Dasma arbëreshe (transl. Arbëresh wedding), composed by Rauf Dhomi.

In 2019 the National Theatre of Opera and Ballet of North Macedonia premiered its first Albanian opera - Skënderbeu, created by the composer Fatos Lumani, the librettist Arian Krasniqi and directed by Qëndrim Rijani.
