= Piro Milkani =

Albanian film director (1939–2025)

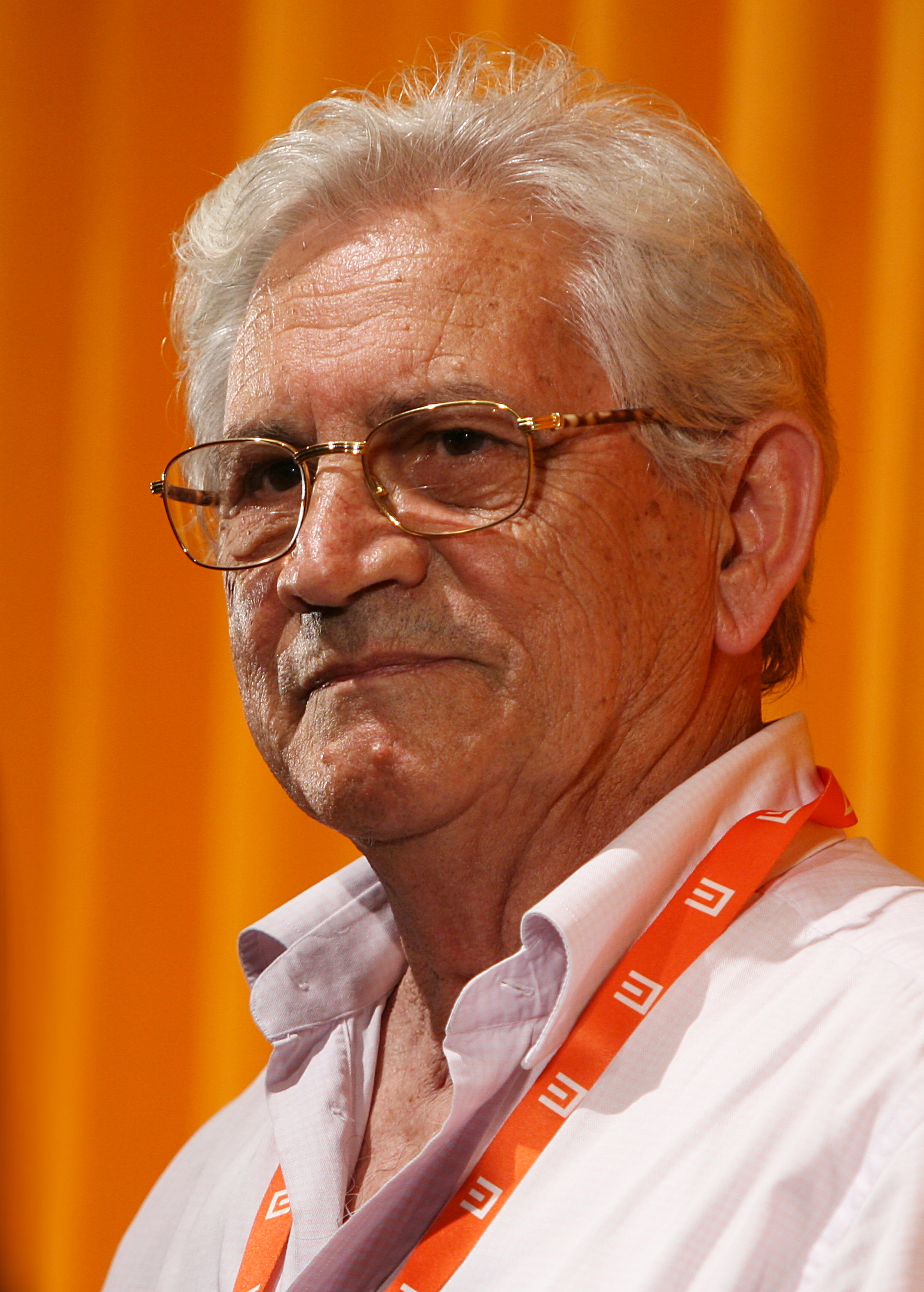
- Milkani in 2008
- Born: Piro Kristaq Milkani; 9 December 1939; Korçë, Albania
- Died: 24 May 2025 (aged 85); Tirana, Albania
- Education: Academy of Fine Arts
- Years active: 1960–2025
- Known for: The Lady from the City
- Spouse: Margarita Kristidhi (m. 1967; died 2025)
- Children: Eno Milkani
- Awards: People's Artist

Piro Kristaq Milkani (9 December 1939 – 24 May 2025) was an Albanian film director, best known for directing two of the most famous Albanian films, The Lady from the City and its sequel. His career in Albanian cinema has made him be regarded as one of the greatest directors of all time.

== Early life and career ==
Milkani was born on 9 December 1939 in Korçë to Kristaq Milkani and Magalina Kita. After completing his secondary education, he pursued higher studies at the Academy of Fine Arts in Prague, Czechoslovakia, where he graduated with a degree in cinematography. Milkani's professional journey in film spans decades, during which he directed more than 20 feature films and documentaries. Some of his most notable works include When the Day Dawned (1971), The Lady from the City (1976), Face to Face (1979), The Militant (1984), and The Colors of Age (1990).

Beyond directing, Milkani has made significant contributions to Albanian cinema as a screenwriter, cameraman, and film producer, solidifying his status as one of the most influential figures in the country's cinematic history. In 2005, Milkani began filming The Sorrow of Mrs. Schneider in the Czech Republic, a co-production featuring renowned actors from both Albanian and Czech cinema, including Nik Xhelilaj, Anna Geislerová, and Arta Dobroshi. The film also showcased performances by two prominent figures of Italian and Albanian cinema, Michele Placido and Violeta Manushi. Milkani had previously collaborated with Manushi in his acclaimed Albanian film The Lady from the City.

== Family tragedy ==
Milkani's older brother, Mihallaq Milkani, was a distinguished naval officer and professor in Albania. In 1957, at the age of 22, he left Albania to study at prestigious naval academies in Saint Petersburg and Riga, then part of the Soviet Union. Upon returning, he served in the Albanian Naval Forces, including duty on submarines near Sazan Island, and later taught for nearly a decade at the Naval Academy in Vlorë.

On 29 March 2024, Mihallaq lost his life in Worcester, Massachusetts, United States, after being struck by a truck while standing in a parking lot. He was 88 years old. The incident occurred while the truck was reversing. Following his death, Piro Milkani referred to his brother as "the best friend of my life."

His youngest brother Vaskë Milkani died in 1973, at the age of 32.

== Personal life and death ==
Milkani was married to renowned Albanian pianist and pedagogue Margarita Kristidhi, affectionately known as "Bebi or Bebi Kristidhi." The couple met in their youth and remained together throughout their lives, forming one of the most distinguished artistic families in Albania. Kristidhi, a professor of piano at the Academy of Arts in Tirana, was widely respected in the country's classical music scene.

Together, they had a son, Eno Milkani, who followed in his father's footsteps and became a film director. Father and son later collaborated professionally, most notably in the film The Sorrow of Mrs. Schneider (2008), which drew from Piro Milkani's own experiences as a student in Prague. The Milkanis were also known for their civic engagement. In 2019, the couple participated in a symbolic environmental initiative in Tirana, donating trees to the Grand Park in the name of their grandchildren.

Milkani died in Tirana on 24 May 2025, at the age of 85.

== Awards ==
For his outstanding contribution to Albanian cinema, Piro Milkani was awarded the honorary title "People's Artist" (Artist i Popullit), one of the highest distinctions granted by the Albanian state for excellence in the arts.
