= Jorgjia Filçe-Truja =

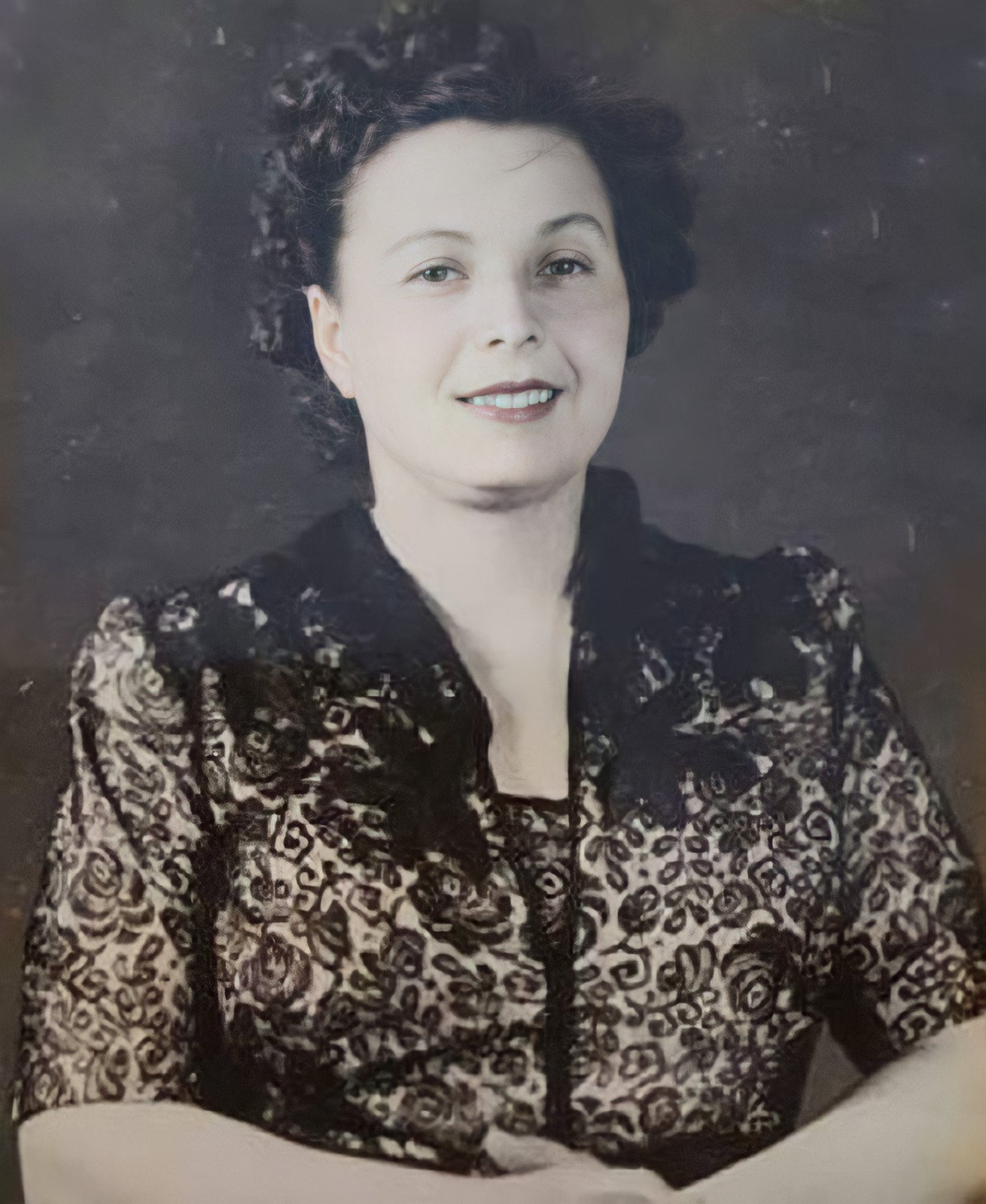
- Filçe-Truja in 1947

Background information
- Born: 20 January 1907; Korçë, Ottoman Empire (today Albania)
- Died: 22 June 1994 (aged 87) Tirana, Albania
- Genres: Urban songs, opera
- Occupations: Singer, academic
- Award: People's Artist

Jorgjia Filçe-Truja (20 January 1907 – 22 June 1994) was an Albanian soprano. She was one of the icons of the Albanian urban lyrical music, and one of the main contributors for the establishment of the Academy of Arts of Albania.

== Life ==
She was born in Korçë, today's eastern Albania, back then still part of the Ottoman Empire on 20 January 1907. She studied in the Santa Сеcilia Conservatory in Rome during 1927–1932. She gave many concerts during the 1930s to the 1950s, becoming an icon of the urban lyrical music in Albania. Together with Tefta Tashko-Koço and Marie Kraja, she represented the avant-garde of the lyrical music in the country. Together with the pianist Lola Gjoka, she is interpreted urban songs as U mbush mali plot me dushk (The mountain became full of oak trees), As aman moj lule (Please you flower), Erdh' prandvera plot lule (The spring came full of flowers), Kroj i fshatit tonë (Spring of our village), Kur më shkoje lumit goce (When you went along the river my girl), etc.

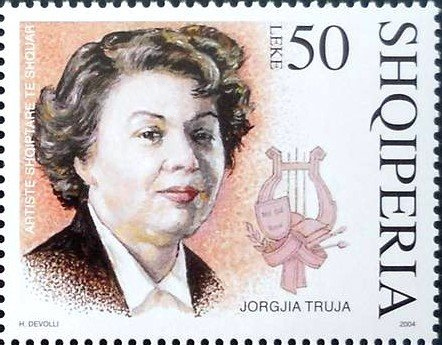
Filçe-Truja on a 2004 stamp of Albania

Truja was one of the first pedagogues of the Queen Mother Pedagogical Institute for girls in Tirana. After World War II, she became one of the initiators for bringing the artistic life of Albanian into an academic path by establishing the first higher art institutions, such as Jordan Misja Lyceum in 1946, Academy of Arts of Albania, where she lectured canto and conducting. She interpreted in many operas and brought to the stage many works as a director. She died in Tirana in 1994, leaving behind an autobiographical work.

== Notes and references ==
Notes

- a: 1909 has been accepted before the original birth-certificate in Turkish was discovered

Sources

- Koço, Eno (2004). Albanian Urban Lyric Song in the 1930s. Vol. 1. Lanham, MD: Scarecrow Press. ISBN 978-0-8108-4890-0.
