= Arian Çuliqi =

Albanian film director (born 1960)

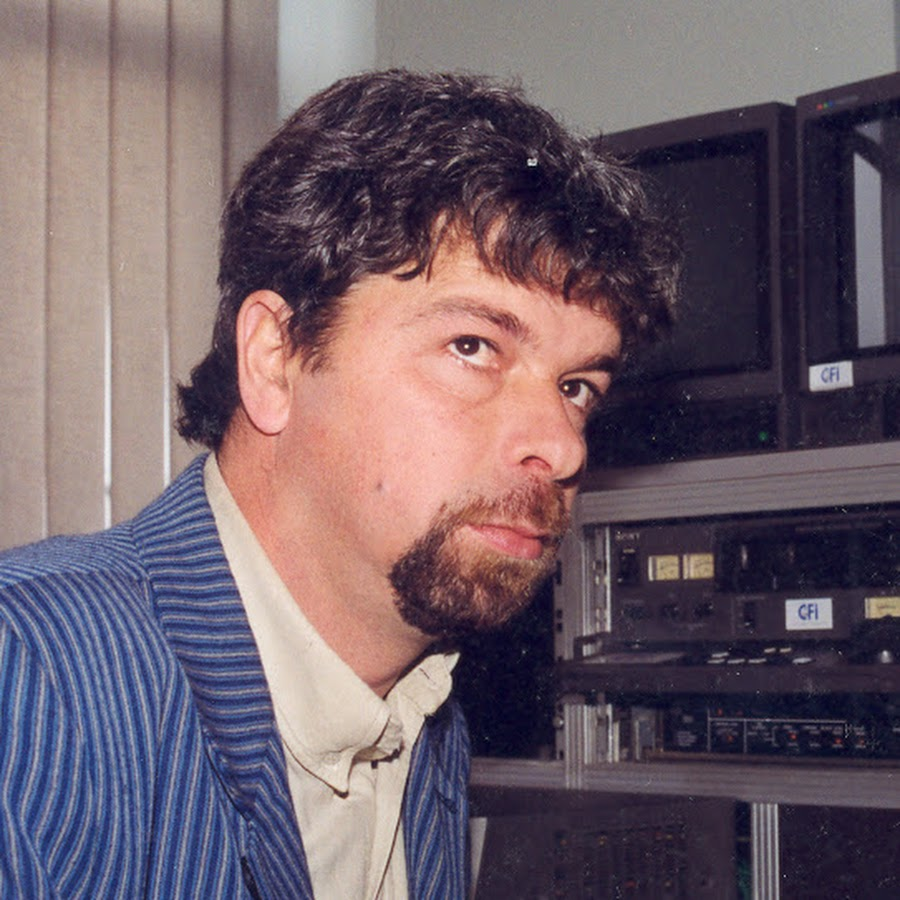
- Born: March 25, 1960 (age 66); Shkodër, Albania
- Occupations: Director; screenwriter; producer
- Years active: 1990–present
- Children: 1

Arian Çuliqi (25 March 1960) is an Albanian film director, actor, screenwriter and producer who has produced films based for Albanian television since 1993, always in comedy genres.

== Life and career ==
Çuliqi was born in Shkodër on 25 March 1960. He started directing comedy shows and films made for television. Most of them were comedies and black comedies with comics and actors from Albania cinematography like Sejfulla Myftari (Cekja), Vasillaq Vangjeli, Rita Lati, Behar Mera, Aishe Stari, Aleko Prodani, Natasha Sela, Muharrem Hoxha, Eriselda Shllaku, Diana Proko etc.

Çuliqi directed and wrote the script for his first film in Dashi pa brirë (1993). This followed by Pak freskët sonte in 1994 and Gjithë fajet i ka paraja and Fundi i marrëzisë in 1995. Other films include Dashuri me krisma which he directed and wrote for national Albanian TV in 1997.

He has directed films such as the drama film Borxhliu in 1999. Other films: Një baba tepër (2000), Pas një lajmi (2003), Pesha e gruas sime (2002), Piruet (2004–2005) and Vdekje me Porosi (2014).
