= Orgocka =

Orgocka is a surname. Notable people with the surname include:

- Dhimitër Orgocka (1936–2021), Albanian actor and director
- Dhorkë Orgocka (1937–2002), Albanian actress
