= The Lady from the City =

Zonja nga qyteti
- Directed by: Piro Milkani
- Written by: Ruzhdi Pulaha
- Produced by: Josif Kromidha
- Starring: Violeta Manushi; Rajmonda Bulku; Stavri Shkurti; Pandi Raidhi; Yllka Mujo; Piro Kita; Sotiraq Bratko; Vasillaq Vangjeli
- Edited by: Androniqi Vangjeli
- Music by: Agim Krajka
- Release date: 4 December 1976
- Running time: 105 minutes
- Country: Albania
- Language: Albanian

The Lady from the City (Albanian: Zonja nga qyteti) is a 1976 Albanian comedy film directed by Piro Milkani, starring Violeta Manushi as Teto Ollga.

== Plot ==
The film tells the story of Ollga, an old lady from the city that moved to the village to stay with her daughter, a young beautiful girl. Under socialism, young people were routinely sent to villages after graduation to work in order to get experience as well as contribute to previously underserved communities in their field of study. Her daughter, Meli, (Rajmonda Bulku) studied as a nurse. Teto Ollga had an attitude of superiority toward villagers, but at the end, she finds herself comfortable among them and she becomes useful as she starts working as chef. The movie features a great view of the village, Tushemisht, located in Pogradec, Albania, with its numerous canals, the lake, Drilon springs, and high mountains.

== Cast ==
- Violeta Manushi as Ollga
- Rajmonda Bulku as Meli
- Stavri Shkurti as Sala, Party's First Secretary
- Pandi Raidhi as Bako Këmbora
- Yllka Mujo as Shpresa
- Piro Kita as Bujar
- Sotiraq Bratko as Tirka
- Vasillaq Vangjeli as Koçi
- Hasan Fico as Malua
- Vangjel Grabocka as Shahin
