= The Sorrow of Mrs. Schneider =

- Film poster
- Directed by: Piro Milkani; Eno Milkani
- Written by: Piro Milkani; Radek Šofr
- Produced by: Piro Milkani; Jana Tomsová
- Starring: Nik Xhelilaj; Anna Geislerová; Tomáš Töpfer; Michele Placido; Arta Dobroshi; Barbora Štěpánová; Violeta Manushi
- Cinematography: Miro Gábor; Afrim Spahiu
- Edited by: Eno Milkani
- Music by: Milan Kymlicka
- Production companies: Bunker Film; Studio Fáma 92
- Distributed by: CinemArt
- Release date: 28 February 2008
- Running time: 104 minutes
- Countries: Albania; Czech Republic
- Languages: Czech; Albanian

The Sorrow of Mrs. Schneider (Albanian: Trishtimi i zonjës Shnajder, Czech: Smutek paní Šnajderové) is a 2008 Albanian-Czech romantic drama film directed by Piro Milkani and Eno Milkani, and written by Piro Milkani and Radek Šofr. Inspired by events in Piro's life, the film is about the romance between an Albanian film student in Czechoslovakia.

== Plot ==
It is 1961 and an Albanian student (Nik Xhelilaj) of the Academy of Performing Arts in Prague, together with a group of Czech students, is shooting his graduate movie on a motorcycle factory, in the small market town of Český Šternberk, in then Czechoslovakia. Coming from a country that is completely isolated from the rest of Europe, he is fascinated by the lifestyle, society and "erotic exuberance" of the Czech golden youth, yet feeling strong links with his family in his homeland. He falls in love with a married woman (Anna Geislerová), the wife of a police superintendent (Paolo Buglioni) and is insecure about his future.

== Cast ==
- Nik Xhelilaj as Lekë Seriani
- Anna Geislerová as Mrs. Šnajderová
- Tomáš Töpfer as Director Piskáček
- Michele Placido as Count Jiří Sternberg
- Arta Dobroshi as Ema
- Paolo Buglioni as Mr. Šnajder
- Kamil Kollárik as Artur Zach
- Violeta Manushi

== Production ==
Pirro Milkani, who was Albania's ambassador to the Czech Republic and Slovakia from 1998 to 2002, codirected the film with his son Eno. Pirro cowrote the film with Radek Šofr and it is based on Pirro's experiences at the Film and TV School of the Academy of Performing Arts in Prague, which he attended from 1955 to 1961. Pirro wrote the script over the course of six days at the Neurological Hospital of Tirana while his mother suffered a cerebral hemorrhage. Eno edited the film and Milan Kymlicka composed the music.

Financing was provided by Studio FÁMA 92, TVSH, Fund for the Support of Cinematography, Albania's Ministry of Economy, Culture and Innovation, and Kosovo's Ministry of Culture. This was the first film coproduction between the Czech Republic and Albania.

== Release ==
The Sorrow of Mrs. Schneider premiered in Tirana, and Prague, on 28 February 2008. Albania selected it as its nominee for the Academy Award for Best International Feature Film at the 81st Academy Awards, but it was not one of the finalists.

== Works cited ==
=== News ===
- ""Trishtimi i Zonjës Shnajder"/ Milkani: Historia ime, e kërkova pas 30 vitesh t'i tregoj se i kam dedikuar filmin, nuk e gjeta". ABC. 1 February 2024. Archived from the original on 9 April 2025.
- ""Trishtimi zonjës Shnajder" nuk hyn në top-pesë filmat e huaj". Telegrafi. 2009. Archived from the original on 9 April 2025.
- Grgić, Ana (2014). "Eno Milkani on Balkan Cinema". East European Film Bulletin. Archived from the original on 9 April 2025.
- Likmeta, Besar (11 March 2008). "The Sorrow of Mrs. Schneider". Balkan Insight. Archived from the original on 9 April 2025.
- Tuci, Mira (27 October 2008). ""The Sorrow of Mrs. Schneider", in the Oscar race". Alsat. Archived from the original on 15 June 2011.

=== Web ===
- "The Sorrow of Mrs. Schneider". Turner Classic Movies. Archived from the original on April 9, 2025.
- "The Sorrow of Mrs. Schneider". Filmový přehled. Archived from the original on 9 April 2025.
