= Beni Walks on His Own =

1975 Albanian comedy film

Beni ecën vetë
- Directed by: Xhanfise Keko, Leonat Krasniqi
- Written by: Kiço Blushi, Leonat Krasniqi
- Starring: Yllka Mujo; Pandi Raidhi; Dhorkë Orgocka
- Release date: January 24, 1975
- Running time: 80 minutes
- Country: Albania
- Language: Albanian

Beni Walks on His Own (Albanian: Beni ecën vetë) is a 1975 Albanian comedy family film directed by Xhanfize Keko and written by Kiço Blushi.

== Summary ==
Beni is an eight-year-old boy living in Korçë with his parents. Beni leads a sheltered life. His mother is very protective and doesn't let him play outside. When Beni is able to go outside, the neighborhood children make fun of him, often calling him a "scaredy cat" and a "mama's boy." One day when his uncle Thomai is visiting, he sees Beni crying after the other children took his horse. Thomai decides to take Beni on horseback to a distant village where he teaches him about life and how to be a man. In the village Beni learns a great deal and blossoms into a mature boy. On the way back to the city Beni doesn't need to ride on horseback, he is able to walk all the way home on his own.

== Cast ==
- Yllka Mujo as Leta
- Pandi Raidhi as Thomai
- Dhorkë Orgocka as Ollga
- Herion Mustafaraj as Beni
- Gjergj Sollaku as Goni
- Koço Guda as Vaso
- Ema Shteto as Drita
