= Rezana Çeliku =

Albanian actress and television presenter (1959–2026)

- Born: 25 September 1959; Tirana, PR Albania
- Died: 20 August 2026 (aged 66); Tirana, Albania
- Occupations: Actress, television presenter
- Years active: 1976–1989

Rezana Çeliku (25 September 1959 – 20 August 2026) was an Albanian actress and television presenter. She appeared in several Albanian feature films during the 1970s and 1980s and worked as an announcer and presenter for television programmes and festivals.

== Career ==
Çeliku began her career in television, working as an announcer and presenter of programmes and festivals. She later appeared in several Albanian film productions.

Her film roles included Vali in Zonja nga qyteti (1976), Shpresa in Ata ishin katër (1977), Teacher Zana in Shokë të një skuadre (1984), and Vera in Një djalë dhe një vajzë (1989).

After ending her work in cinema, Çeliku worked in other professional fields, including public administration. She studied economics and law and worked in the administration of the Tirana Municipality.

== Filmography ==
Year	Title	Role
1976	Zonja nga qyteti	Vali
1977	Ata ishin katër	Shpresa
1984	Shokë të një skuadre	Teacher Zana
1989	Një djalë dhe një vajzë	Vera

== Television ==
Çeliku worked as an announcer and presenter for programmes and festivals broadcast by Albanian Television.

== Death ==
Çeliku died in Tirana on 20 August 2026, at the age of 66.
