= Debatik (film) =

- Film poster
- Directed by: Hysen Hakani; Gëzim Erebara
- Written by: Selman Vaqari; Niko Koleka; Gëzim Erebara; Hysen Hakani
- Produced by: Todi Bozo
- Cinematography: Dhimitër Anagnosti; Viktor Gjika
- Edited by: Vitori Celi
- Music by: Tish Daija
- Production company: Kinostudio
- Release date: 27 December 1961
- Running time: 71 minutes
- Country: Albania
- Language: Albanian

Debatik is a 1961 Albanian drama film directed by Hysen Hakani and Gëzim Erebara. It was written by Selman Vaqari, Niko Koleka, Erebara, and Hakani as a fictional work about the creation of the Debatik organization in Albania in 1942.

Filmed in Tirana, Debatik was the second feature film produced by Kinostudio. It was released in Albania and China.

== Plot ==
Three years after the Italian invasion of Albania, children create their anti-fascist organization, called Debatik (Albanian: Djemtë E Bashkuar Anëtarë Të Ideve Komuniste, in English United Boys Members of Communist Ideas).

Coli, an orphaned poor boy, is proud to be accepted in the organization and helps Debatik steal weapons from Italian soldiers. However, Debatik's headquarters is discovered by Italian engineers and find documents that allow them to arrest several members, including Coli. He manages to inform his communist teacher that he is trapped by the fascist prosecutors, but is killed while doing so. Uncle Demir finds the boy and transports his dead body in his carriage.

== Cast ==
- Shpetim Zani as Coli
- Dhimitër Pecani as Agimi
- Pëllumb Dërvishi as Genci
- Sulejman Pitarka as Teacher
- Seit Boshnjaku as Tenente Franco
- Gjon Karma as Jorgo
- Lazër Vlashi as Prosecutor
- Sander Prosi as School director
- Roland Trebicka as Kosta
- Loro Kovaçi as Drejtori italjan
- Ndrek Shkjezi as The shop keeper
- Skënder Plasari as Skënderi
- Gjeranqina Osmanlliu as Merushja
- Besim Levonja as Uncle Lymi
- Benhur Tila as Agroni
- Mario Ashiku as Astiti
- Luigjina Leka as Shpresa
- Qenan Toro as Provocateur
- Tonin Kançi as Captain Bruno
- Violeta Manushi as Agron's mother
- Ilia Shyti as the customer buying fabric for his departed son's coffin.

== Production ==
In 1958, Tana became the first feature film produced entirely by Albania. The second feature film entirely produced by Kinostudio, Debatik was directed by Hysen Hakani and Gëzim Erebara. Sulejman Vaqari, Niko Koleka, Hakani, and Erebara wrote the script. Tish Daija composed the music for the film. Shooting was done in Tirana.

The name of the film comes from the acronym of the Pioneers of Enver, Djemtë E Bashkuar Anëtarë Të Ideve Komuniste, rather than the Albanian word.

== Release ==
Debatik premiered on 27 December 1961, and was released in China under the name Tamen ye zai zhandou. It was shown at the Giffoni Film Festival in 1985, under the title La discussione.

== Works cited ==
- "Debatik". Central State Film Archive. Archived from the original on 7 April 2025.
- "The Discussion". Giffoni Film Festival. Archived from the original on 7 April 2025.
- Mëhilli, Elidor (2018). "Globalized Socialism, Nationalized Time: Soviet Films, Albanian Subjects, and Chinese Audiences across the Sino-Soviet Split". Slavic Review. 77 (3). Cambridge University Press: 611–37. doi:10.2307/26565651. JSTOR 26565651.
- Taylor, Richard; Wood, Nancy; Graffy, Julian; Iordanova, Dina, eds. (2000). The BFI Companion to Eastern European and Russian Cinema. British Film Institute. ISBN 0851707521.
- Williams, Bruce (2023). Albanian Cinema through the Fall of Communism: Silver Screens and Red Flags. Amsterdam University Press. ISBN 9789048529339.
