= Drita =

Drita may refer to:

- Drita (name), an Albanian female name, with the meaning "light"
- Drita (magazine), an Albanian magazine founded by Petro Poga
- Drita Albanian Folk Orchestra, an Albanian folk orchestra in Los Angeles, California
- FC Drita, a football club based in Gjilan, Kosovo
- FK Drita, a football club based in the village of Bogovinje near Tetovo, North Macedonia
