= Drita (name) =

Drita is an Albanian female given name, which means "light" (Albanian: dritë). The name may refer to:

- FC Drita, Football Club from Kosovo (founded 1947)
- Drita Como (1958–1981), Albanian poet
- Drita D'Avanzo (born 1976), Albanian-American reality television participant
- Drita Pelingu (1926–2013), Albanian actress
- Drita Ziri, Albanian model and beauty pageant titleholder, Miss Earth 2023 (born 2005)

== See also ==
- Drita (disambiguation)
