= Trebicka =

Trebicka is a surname. Notable people with the surname include:

- Roland Trebicka (1947–2013), Albanian actor
