= Llazi Sërbo =

Albanian actor (1945–2010)

- Born: 9 March 1945; Korçë, Albania
- Died: 12 September 2010 (aged 65); Korçë, Albania
- Occupations: Actor, director
- Years active: 1970–2010

Llazi Sërbo (9 March 1945 – 12 September 2010) was an Albanian actor.

His 40-year-long activity included around 100 roles. He is particularly remembered for the films Yjet e Neteve te gjata (English: Stars of Long Nights) (1972) and Operacioni Zjarri (English: Operation Fire) (1973), whereas he also played an excellent German Wehrmacht official in the movie Nusja dhe shtetrrethimi (English: The Bride and the Curfew) (1978). Sërbo was granted the Merited Artist of Albania award in 1991 and the Nderi i Qarkut (English: Honor of the County) (of the County of Korçë) award in 2009.

Sërbo had suffered for a long time from depression and committed suicide on 12 September 2010, following the example of the other well-known Albanian actor, Bekim Fehmiu, who had also killed himself three months earlier.

== Early life ==
Sërbo was born in 1945 in the city of Korçë, Albania, to an Albanian, Orthodox Christian family. In Korçë, he finished elementary and high school education. After high school, he worked as a painting teacher in the town of Pogradec. After two years of teaching he attended the Academy of Arts in Tirana, where he profitably studied acting in the following four years.

== Career ==
Sërbo was for the following forty years an actor and director in the Andon Z. Çajupi theatre of Korçë. He also had prominent roles in many movies produced by the Albanian Kinostudio Shqipëria e Re. His first role in theatre was in the Njollat e murrme drama (English: The Black Spots). He also acted in many Albanian films. His first role in a movie was in Yjet e Neteve te gjata (English: Stars of Long Nights) (1972), in the role of Dajlan. His first starring role came in the Operacioni Zjarri film (English: Operation Fire) (1973), where Sërbo had the role of Kreshnik Martini, a Sigurimi agent, infiltrated into an anti-communist band operating in northern Albania in 1953, a scenario taken from a real story. After that movie, Sërbo was one of the victims of the 1973 purges of the 11th Plenum of the Communist Party of Albania, which caused him to disappear from any movies for a full four-year period: during this time he played only on theatre roles. Upon his return to cinematography, he continued to excel in all the roles he played. Memorable is the role of the German Wehrmacht official in the Nusja dhe shtetrrethimi film (English: The Bride and the Curfew) (1978). In this role he was silent in most of the movie, pronouncing only a few sentences in german language.

Sërbo was considered to be a handsome actor and never passed unobserved in his movies, rather his presence was felt. In addition to his good appearance, he was often said by movie directors to be a perfectionist in his approach to acting. In the Kush vdes në këmbë movie (English: Who dies on his feet) (1984), dedicated to the figure of 19th century patriot and Albanian language teacher, Petro Nini Luarasi, Sërbo refused to show up at the rehearsals and threatened to leave the cast and travel back to his hometown, because he had not been given the right shoes to play his part, that of Ajaz Gjika, a kachak. Sërbo demanded 19th century shoes so that he could fit perfectly in the character. Sërbo also demanded and obtained an excellent horse to play the movie, rather than the one which he had initially been given, because, according to him, "the horse should have a fierce character, similar to that of his master". The horse that ended up playing the movie was, in fact, of an excellent breed, because movie director, Vladimir Prifti, in order to please the actor, found a way to "recruit" the grand-grandchild of Naklon, a horse donated by Joseph Stalin to Albania in the 1950s. The horse had a cost that would today be the equivalent of $2–3 million.

In 1986, one year after Enver Hoxha's death, Sërbo moved to Tirana, where he started to work as an assistant director and had the chance to co-direct a number of movies. He also worked as a director in the theater. Sërbo was critical in the last years with the fact that, according to him, there are more actors than premieres. Sërbo was the author of the mise-en-scène of Kostandine and Doruntine and co-scenarist of the theatrical piece with the Albanian well-known writer Ismail Kadare.

Sërbo had suffered from chronic depression of which he was under cures. Nevertheless, therapies notwithstanding, he killed himself with his hunting rifle on 12 September 2010 and was found dead in the morning after at his house in Korçë. He was 65 and had never been married and he had no children.

He had prior confided to one of his close friends that he wished to have a death similar to that of another famous Albanian actor, Bekim Fehmiu, who had committed suicide three months before Sërbo's death.

Besides acting, Sërbo cherished photography as a hobby. He was a participant in the Albanian photography competition Marubi 2003. Sërbo had been awarded the Merited Artist of Albania award in 1991 and the Nderi i Qarkut (English: Honor of the County) award in 2009.

== Filmography ==
The following chronological is Sërbo's list of movies per IMDb.

- Yjet e Neteve te gjata (English: Stars of Long Nights) (1972)
- Operacioni Zjarri (English: The Operation Fire) (1973)
- Shëmbja e idhujve (English: The Destruction of the Idols) (1977)
- Nusja dhe shtetërrethimi (English: The Bride and the Curfew) (1978)
- Gracka (English: The trap) (1983)
- Kush vdes në këmbë (English: Who dies on his feet) (1984)
- Dasma e shtyrë (English: The Postponed Wedding) (1984)
- Tre njerëz me guna (English: Three Men with Cloaks) (1985)
- Asgjë nuk harrohet (English: Nothing is Forgotten) (1985)
- I treti (The third)(1978)
