= Borxhliu =

- Directed by: Arian Çuliqi
- Written by: Arian Çuliqi
- Starring: Sejfulla Myftari; Aleko Prodani; Hajrie Rondo
- Release date: 1999
- Country: Albania
- Language: Albanian

Borxhliu is a 1999 Albanian TV drama film directed and written by Arian Çuliqi. The film starred Sejfulla Myftari, Aleko Prodani, and Hajrie Rondo.
