= Honeymoons (film) =

- Directed by: Goran Paskaljević
- Written by: Goran Paskaljević; Genc Permeti
- Produced by: Ilir Butka; Nikolaj Divanovic; Dritan Huqi; Goran Paskaljević
- Starring: Nebojša Milovanović; Jelena Trkulja; Jozef Shiroka; Mirela Naska
- Cinematography: Milan Spasic
- Edited by: Petar Putniković; Kristina Poženel
- Music by: Rade Krstic
- Release date: 5 September 2009 (VFF)
- Running time: 95 minutes
- Countries: Serbia; Albania
- Languages: Serbian; Albanian
- Budget: €900,000

Honeymoons (Serbian: Medeni mesec; Albanian: Muaj mjalti) is a 2009 Serbian-Albanian drama film directed by Goran Paskaljević and co-written by Paskaljević and Genc Permeti.

== Plot ==
Hoping for a better life, two young couples leave their respective countries. Maylinda and Nik leave Albania by boat to Italy, to live their forbidden love. Meanwhile, Vera and Marko leave Serbia by train for Austria, through Hungary. Marko, a talented cellist, is lucky enough to enter the famous Vienna Philharmonic Orchestra. But when they arrive at the border, although they have visas in order, their problems begin.

== Cast ==
- Nebojša Milovanović as Marko
- Jelena Trkulja as Vera
- Jozef Shiroka as Nik
- Mirela Naska as Maylinda
- Lazar Ristovski as Vera's Uncle
- Petar Božović as Vera's Father
- Bujar Lako as Nik's Father
- Yllka Mujo as Nik's Mother
- Aron Balazs as Hungarian Cop
- Mira Banjac as Stana
- Klodian Hoxha as Ilir
- Zinaida Dedakin as Vera's Aunt

== Production ==
Produced by Nova film, Ska-Ndal, and Beograd Film, Honeymoons was the first film coproduction between Albania and Serbia. Goran Paskaljević was the director and co-wrote the film with Genc Permeti. Petar Putniković and Kristina Poženel edited the film.

Financial support was provided by the Ministry of Culture and Information of Serbia, Apulia Film Commission, and the Albanian National Film Center. With a budget of €900,000, filming was done in Tirana using 35 mm movie film.

== Release ==
Honeymoons premiered on 24 November 2009. It shown by the Museum of Modern Art from 9 to 15 September 2010, and at the International Film Festival Rotterdam, Human Rights Watch Film Festival, and Venice Film Festival.

== Reception ==
Leslie Felperin, writing for Variety, praised the performances as "solid and harmoniously". Elise Nakhnikian, writing for Slant Magazine, called the film "the cinematic equivalent of a Theodore Dreiser novel". Dan Fainaru, writing for Screen Daily, praised Milan Spasic's cinematography as his "confident camera keeps the film moving briskly forward". The Hollywood Reporter's review of the film praised the wedding scene as it "expertly blend humor and drama".

Marsida Gjoncaj, writing for Tirana Times, criticized inaccuracies in the film, such as folk music from southern Albania being played in the north, buses from the north coming from central Albania, and the depiction of wedding customs at the Albanian and Serbian weddings.

== Accolades ==
Award	Date of ceremony	Category	Recipient(s)	Result	Ref.
54th Valladolid International Film Festival	2009	Golden Spike	Honeymoons	Won	
1st Les Arcs Film Festival	2009	Jury Prize	Honeymoons	Won	

== Works cited ==
=== News ===
- "Honeymoons — Film Review". The Hollywood Reporter. 7 September 2009. Archived from the original on 14 April 2025.
- Felperin, Leslie (3 September 2009). "Honeymoons". Variety. Archived from the original on 14 April 2025.
- Fainaru, Dan (10 September 2009). "Honeymoons". Screen Daily. Archived from the original on 26 October 2020.
- Gjoncaj, Marsida (2010). "Honeymoons, or how to waste a good plot on a bunch of inaccuracies". Tirana Times. Archived from the original on 14 April 2025.
- Hopewell, John (2 November 2009). "Valladolid goes for 'Honeymoons'". Variety. Archived from the original on 14 April 2025.
- Lemercier, Fabien (15 December 2009). "Unmade Beds triumphs at Les Arcs". Cineuropa. Archived from the original on 14 April 2025.
- Nakhnikian, Elise (16 June 2010). "Human Rights Watch Film Festival 2010: Goran Paskaljevic's Honeymoons". Slant Magazine. Archived from the original on 14 April 2025.
- Senjanovic, Natasha (5 September 2009). "Paskaljevic returns with not-so-romantic Honeymoons". Cineuropa. Archived from the original on 14 April 2025.

=== Web ===
- "Honeymoon". Karlovy Vary International Film Festival. Archived from the original on 14 April 2025.
- "Honeymoons". International Film Festival Rotterdam. Archived from the original on 14 April 2025.
- "Medeni mesec". Film Center of Serbia. Archived from the original on 14 April 2025.
- "MoMA Presents: Goran Paskaljevic's Honeymoons". Museum of Modern Art. Archived from the original on 14 April 2025.
- "MoMA Presents Goran Paskaljevic Honeymoons". Museum Publicity. 16 August 2010. Archived from the original on 14 April 2025.
