= Lola Gjoka =

Albanian pianist

- Born: Lola Aleksi; 22 May 1910; Sevastopol, Russia
- Died: 6 October 1985 (aged 75); Tirana, Albania
- Style: Piano
- Awards: People's Artist Merited Artist

Lola Gjoka Aleksi (22 May 1910 – 6 October 1985) was an Albanian pianist during the period of the Communist regime. She began learning the piano at the age of six, and studied under the pianist Karalovy. Gjoka and Maria Kraja recorded over 300 Albanian songs together. During the Italian occupation of Albania, she appeared on Italian stages. She taught at the Jordan Misja high school and became a concertmaster at the State Philharmonic Orchestra of Albania. She later became a teacher at the Tirana State Conservatory. Gjoka performed in Albania, China, Bulgaria, Greece, the USSR, Romania, and Cuba. In 1976, she appeared in the films Tinguj lufte (Sounds of War) and Ballë për ballë (Face to Face). For her work, she was awarded the titles of "Merited Artist" and "People's Artist" of Albania.

== Life ==
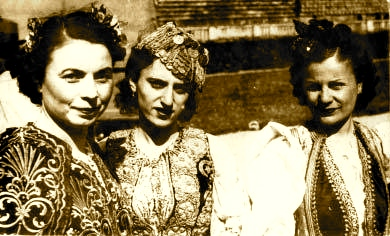
Jorgjia Filçe-Truja, Lola Gjoka and Tefta Tashko-Koço

Gjoka was born in Sevastopol in 1910, into an Albanian family. She began learning the piano at the age of six, and her success was such that her father arranged for her to have lessons from the pianist Karalovy. In 1932 her family moved to Korçë, where Gjoka worked as an accompanist for singers including the soprano Tefta Tashko-Koço, the Albanian folk singer Marie Kraja, and Mihal Ciko.

In 1933 she won a significant prize in an international piano competition in Vienna, which got her a job to teach piano at the Institute for Girls in Tirana. She graduated with honours from the Athens Conservatory in 1936.

Gjoka, along with Maria Kraja, a notable singer of traditional Albanian Urban Lyric Songs, worked together and they recorded over 300 songs. By today's standards the recordings were not prefect; however they still survive today as a record of Albanian musical culture.

During the Italian occupation of Albania Gjoka appeared in Italian stages. In November 1944 she played at a concert in Tirana to celebrate the end of German occupation. She was one of the first teachers at the "Jordan Misja" high school in 1947. The school was targeted at artistically talented children. Additionally, in 1951, Gjoka became a concertmaster at the State Philharmonic Orchestra of Albania. As a result, Gjoka translated the libretto from Antonín Dvořák's opera Rusalka into Albanian.

On 15 January 1962 a Conservatory was founded in Tirana (Konservatori Shteteror i Tiranes, which was merged in 1966 into the Academy of Arts in Tirana), and Gjoka was in the first group of teachers she combined with giving concerts. She primarily performed in Albania, but she also presented to China, Bulgaria, Greece, the USSR, Romania, and Cuba. In 1976 she appeared in the film Tinguj lufte (Sounds of War) as a pianist and three years later she also appeared in the movie Ballë për ballë (Face to Face).

== Death and recognition ==
Gjoka died in Tirana in 1985, at the age of 75. For her work she was awarded the titles of "Merited Artist" and "People's Artist". An award for young pianists in Albania was founded in her name.

In 2002, Hamide Stringa wrote her biography.
