= Fitnete Rexha =

Albanian singer (1933–2003)

Fitnete Rexha (April 3, 1933 – August 13, 2003) was an Albanian folk singer and recipient of the Merited Artist of Albania title.

== Life ==
Fitnete Rexha was born in Tirana on April 3, 1933, where she also died on August 14, 2003. She holds the title of Merited Artist of Albania, and was one of the most prominent folk singers of middle Albania, mainly of folk music of Tirana. Fitnete came into contact with the tradition of popular folk music in Tirana in her family. The youngest daughter of Bab Rexh Delia, at about 15 years, she started to sing and record folk songs at Radio-Tirana under the orchestra band of Middle Albania directed by Muharrem Gura and Skënder Reka. The orchestra consisted of musicians Skënder Reka on the accordion, Liu Nushi and Çerçiz Mehmeti on the violin, Reshit Shehu at the dayereh, Mustafa Zyberi on the clarinet, Riza Selita on the contrabass, Emil Miloti and Fadili of the Army Ensemble in the guitar. Initially she started working as a singer at the Estrada of Tirana and then her singing activity was held entirely by the Albanian National Song and Dance Ensemble in Tirana until her retirement in 1981. Among the most beautiful songs sung by F. Rexha are I'm dressed in white, There, to the seven hyacinths, Two beautiful ones in a door ecc. She has recorded about 200 popular songs of Middle Albania. Her music recordings are mostly found at Radio Tirana. Academic. Composer Çesk Zadeja once said of her, "As long as the popular songs of Middle Albania will be heard, the singer Fitnete Rexha will be remembered."

== See also ==
- Albanian music
