= Hysen Hakani =

Albanian film director and screenwriter

Hysen Hakani (July 28, 1932 – February 7, 2011) was an Albanian film director and screenwriter. Hakani is credited with directing Albania's first short film, Fëmijët e saj, which was released in 1957. Hakani died on February 7, 2011, at the age of 78.

== Biography ==
Hakani studied at the Qemal Stafa High School, in Tirana, Albania.

== Filmography ==
- 1957 - Fëmijët e saj
- 1961 - Debatik
- 1963 - Toka jonë
- 1966 - Oshëtimë në bregdet
- 1969 - Njësiti guerril
- 1972 - Ndërgjegja
- 1977 - Cirku në fshat
- 1979 - Mysafiri
- 1981 - Plaku dhe hasmi
- 1984 - Lundrimi i parë
