= Teodor Keko =

Albanian writer, journalist, and politician

- Born: 2 September 1958; Tirana, Albania
- Died: 20 August 2002 (aged 43); Thessaloniki, Greece
- Occupations: journalist, writer, politician
- Spouse: Xhulieta Keko
- Writing career
- Language: Albanian
- Notable works: Loja (The Game), 1990; Lajmëtarja e vdekjeve (The harbinger of deaths), 1991

Teodor Keko (September 2, 1958 – August 20, 2002) was an Albanian writer, journalist, and politician.

== Life ==
Keko was born in the Albanian capital, Tirana, on 2 September 1958, to cinematographer parents Endri and Xhanfise Keko. He studied at the Qemal Stafa High School, in Tirana, Albania. In 1979 he started his studies for Albanian language and literature in the University of Tirana, where he graduated in 1983. During his studies he met his wife Xhulieta, who studied English language and literature and later became a primary school teacher. Her parents were diplomats and served among others in China and Algeria. The couple have two sons, born in the 1980s.

=== Career ===
Keko worked as a journalist for the literary newspaper Drita. When the Stalinist system dissolved in early 90s, Keko joined the opposition movement and the main opposition party, the Democratic Party of Albania, and was elected to Albanian parliament in March 1992. He quickly became critical of the newly elected Albanian President, Sali Berisha, whom he accused of authoritarianism. He and six others were expelled from the Democratic Party in August 1993 and, with two others who voluntarily left the party, formed the Democratic Alliance Party.

Keko wrote for popular daily newspaper Koha Jonë (Our Time), strongly criticizing the first post-communist government, and later became editor of the Democratic Alliance Party newspaper Aleanca (The alliance) and of the weekly cultural and artistic magazine Aks (Axis). Together with the Albanian journalist Arben Kallamata he founded the "Independent League of Journalists". They also were involved in the foundation of the Albanian section of the Association of European Journalists. On 10 March 1994 Teodor Keko was assaulted by two men with brass knuckles outside his Tirana apartment and heavily injured. Keko blamed the then-government of being behind the attack. After Keko died in 2002 his wife and children moved to the Netherlands. In his honor a street in Tirana was renamed "Rruga Teodor Keko" (Teodor Keko Street).

For several years, Keko contributed to Albanian politics, and from 1992 to 1996 he was a member of parliament, first for the Democratic Party and, from August 1993 for the Democratic Alliance Party. Teodor Keko began publishing his first works in the 1980s when he became famous for his short stories.

=== Obituary ===
Keko died aged 43 in Thessaloniki, Greece where he was receiving treatment, shortly after being diagnosed with pancreatic cancer.

The well-known Albanian writer, politician and diplomat Besnik Mustafaj, gave the last speech. Among other things he said:

Ndër të gjithë miqtë e tu të shumtë, mua më ra shorti i vështirë të të them lamtumirën e fundit në emër të tyre. Ne të gjithë të kemi dashur shumë. Dhe po të japim sot me vete mirënjohjen tonë më të thellë, për atë që ti ke ditur, ke mundur dhe ke dashur të na japësh një jetë të tërë. Unë tani përfitoj nga heshtja jote e detyrueshme dhe do të them çfarë të dua. Ti s'më ndërpret dot me të tallur, siç bëje zakonisht...
Among all your many friends, it was my tough luck to say the final farewell in their name. We all loved you greatly. And today we are giving you our most profound gratitude, for that which you have known, have toiled and have desired to give us a full life. I now benefit from your obligatory silence and will say what I want. You cannot disrupt me teasingly this time, as you used to.

== Works ==
His first major work, the novel Loja (The game), was praised. His other works include at least fifteen volumes of poetry, novels, drama, and especially short stories. The novel Lajmëtarja e vdekjeve (The harbinger of deaths), was written during the political regime change. His last work, Hollësira fatale (Fatal details), was a bestseller in Albania in 2001. The works of Teodor Keko are being translated into English by Robert Elsie.

The young Albanian director Eno Milkani based the script of his upcoming movie Shenjtorja ("The Saint") on Keko's Dymbëdhjetë shenjtorë, një profet dhe disa njerëz (Twelve saints, a prophet and some people). According to Milkani, Keko's characters are "products of a hopeless society but with a nobility that blossoms only within them who have gone through a totalitarian system."

His major works list includes:
Prose

- Loja (The Game), Tirana: "Naim Frashëri", 1990. OCLC 441824688.
- Lajmëtarja e vdekjeve (The harbinger of deaths), 1991
- Pretenca (The pretence), Tirana: Albin, 1994. OCLC 35559302.
- Shënimet e një gruaje (The notes of a woman), 1995
- Dymbëdhjetë shenjtorë, një profet dhe disa njerëz (Twelve saints, a prophet and some people), Tirana: 1997. OCLC 37560794.
- Prostituta (The prostitute), Tirana: 1997. OCLC 37574363.
- Made in Albania (Made in Albania), Tirana: Albin, 1998. OCLC 44934220.
- Hollësira fatale (Fatal details), 2001. OCLC 52979389.

Poetry

- Pas provimeve (After the season), 1983
- Fjala fishkëllen (The word whistles), 1987
- Zemra nuk është këmishë (The heart is not a shirt), 1990
- Unë të kam dashur, por… (I have loved you, but..), 1996
- E të tjera, e të tjera… (And so on, and so on), satirical poem, 1997
- Poezi (Poetry), collection of poetry, 2005

== Recognition ==
Beside national prizes and awards (one of each was post-mortum in 2007), a street in Tirana is named after him, "Teodor Keko", since 2005. The Prestige magazine published in Thessaloniki, Greece, has established an annual prize for the short story writers named after him since 2002.

=== National prizes ===
- 1981. Second prize from the Hosteni magazine yearly competition, for Si mund të kthehet dardha në gorricë (How the pear can turn into a wild pear), sketch
- 1982. Second prize from the Hosteni magazine yearly competition, for Një shfaqje e huaj (An imported expression), feuilleton
- 1982. First prize from the Studenti newspaper, for Cikël me poezi (Poetry cycle)
- 1982. Third prize from the annual Nëntori magazine competition, for Cikël me poezi (Poetry cycle)
- 1987. Second prize from the Hosteni magazine yearly competition, for Shtatë mrekullitë e menysë (Seven miracles of the menu), sketch
- 1987. First prize from the Zëri i Rinisë newspaper, for Kongres fitimtarësh (Congress of winners), poem
- 1988. Third prize from the annual Nëntori magazine competition, for Zhgënjim (Disappointment), novelette
- 1989. Prize of encouragement from the "Konkursi kombëtar i 45-vjetorit të Çlirimit" (National competition for the 45-anniversary of the Liberation), for Pretenca (Pretence), novel
- 1996. First prize from the "Velija" journalism competition, for Kriza e vlerave (Crisis of values), publicistics
- 1998. "Penda e Argjendtë" prize, from the annual competition of the Ministry of Culture of Albania, for Made in Albania, collection of short stories
- 1998. First prize from "Soror" journalism competition, for "……………..", analysis

=== Awards ===
- 1989. "Naim Frashëri" Order (Third Class), from the Presidium of the Kuvendi Popullor i Republikës Socialiste të Shqipërisë (decree no. 7324, 7 September 1989)
- 2007. Medal "Për merita të veçanta civile" (For special civic merits), from the President of Albania (decree no. 5375, 26 July 2007)
