= Marie Kraja =

Albanian opera singer (1911–1999)

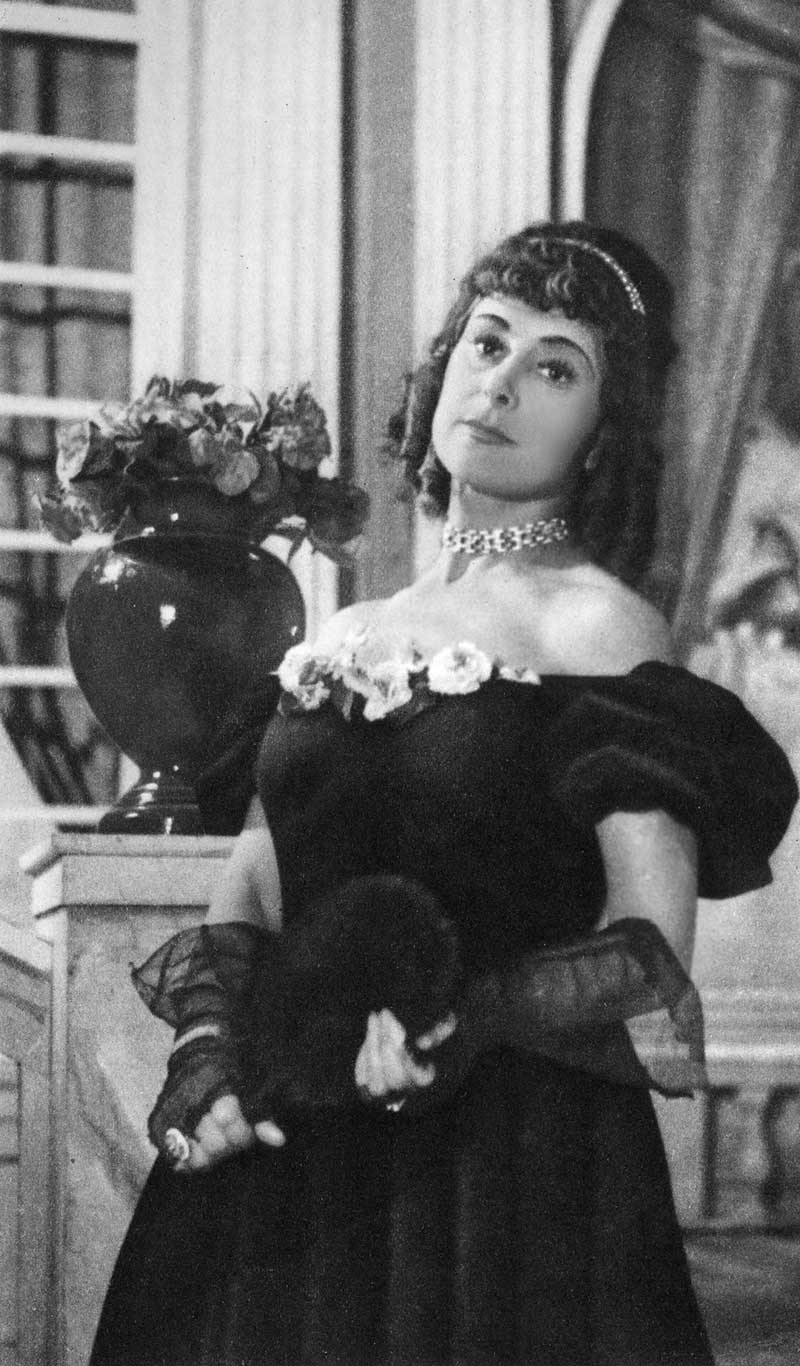
- Born: 24 September 1911; Zadar, Kingdom of Dalmatia, Austria-Hungary (modern Croatia)
- Died: 21 November 1999 (aged 88); Tirana, Albania
- Other names: Marije Kraja; Marie Paluca
- Education: University of Music and Performing Arts Graz
- Occupation: Singer
- Awards: People's Artist

Marie Kraja or Marie Paluca (24 September 1911 – 21 November 1999) was an Albanian opera singer who is particularly known for her delivery of Albanian folk songs.

== Life ==
Kraja was born in 1911 in Zadar, Kingdom of Dalmatia, then part of Austria-Hungary, in a Roman Catholic family. She was a relative of Mother Teresa, and she would later organize the funeral services for her mother and sister. When she was six, her family moved to Shkodra. Although she was an immigrant, her family were Albanian and she had lived in a small Albanian community in Zadar. In Albania she learnt local wedding and love songs. In 1930 she started her singing studies at the Singschule (now University of Music and Performing Arts Graz), which she completed in 1934. After graduation she started to teach at a secondary school in Shkodra, then at the Queen Mother Women's Institute in Tirana. She started making appearances in Tirana with Tonin Guraziu as accompanying pianist. Kraje represented Albania at an "Evening of Nations" hosted in Vienna.

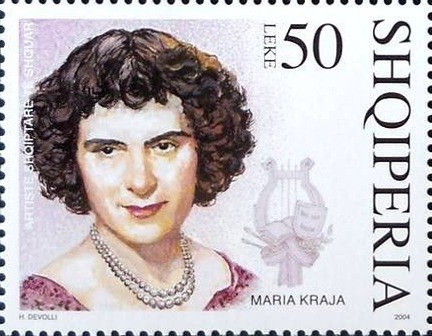
Kraja on a 2004 stamp of Albania

Kraja's singing was peculiar, because she had a German way of phrasing her words, which gave a precision to the phrasing of the lyrics she sang. She started to sing traditional urban songs (Albanian urban lyric songs), and she was able to show how a professionally trained singer could present them. She worked with Lola Gjoka, who was the arranger of the harmonies and also the pianist, and together they recorded over 300 songs. By today's standards the recordings were not perfect, but they still survive today.

In 1937 she gave a recital in Bari, Italy, and the following year she gave concerts in Munich, Germany. That same year she was included in a concert in June with Tefta Tashko-Koço and Lola Gjoka, to raise funds for the baritone Kristo Koço (Tefta Tashko-Koço's husband). He needed the money in order complete his singing lessons he was taking in Milan. In 1939 she gave a recital in Florence before returning home.

After the Second World War, Kraja taught at the Jordan Misja Academy. She combined this with continuing to sing in the Opera, and in 1959 she appeared in the first Albanian opera. The opera was called Mrika, with Prenkë Jakova as composer, and Llazar Siliqi as librettist.

Kraja died in Tirana in 1999. She had been awarded the highest recognition for artists, the People's Artist of Albania title.

== See also ==
- Jorgjia Filçe-Truja
