= Tomka and His Friends =

1977 Albanian drama film

Tomka dhe shokët e tij
- Directed by: Xhanfise Keko
- Written by: Nasho Jorgaqi
- Starring: Enea Zheku; Zehrudin Dokle; Genc Mosho; Sotiraq Cili
- Cinematography: Faruk Basha
- Production company: Albafilm-Tirana
- Distributed by: Albafilm-Tirana
- Release date: October 28, 1977
- Running time: 78 minutes
- Country: Albania
- Language: Albanian

Tomka and his friends (Albanian: Tomka dhe shokët e tij) is a 1977 Albanian drama film directed by Xhanfise Keko. The film stars Enea Zheku as Tomka, the leader of a group of boys fighting Nazis. The movie was mostly shot in the city of Berat, Albania.

== Plot ==
Tomka is a boy who likes playing football with his friends. When the German army captures his town, the German soldiers establish their camp in the town stadium. Tomka with help from his friends and their parents organizes sabotage actions against the soldiers.
