= Pionieri =

Communism in Albania

- Frequency: Monthly
- Publisher: Pioneers of Enver
- Founded: 1945
- Final issue: 1991
- Country: Albania
- Language: Albanian

Pionieri was a monthly magazine published in communist Albania, by the Pioneers of Enver organization, also called Central Committee of the Union of Albanian Working Youth. The magazine, although politicized, is remembered to have influenced scientific formation of the Albanian youth, with relevant translations from analogous foreign magazines.

At age 12, Ismail Kadare wrote his first short stories, which were published in the Pionieri journal in Tirana.
