= Xhanfise Keko =

Albanian film director (1920–1985)

- Born: 27 January 1928; Gjirokastër, Albanian Republic
- Died: 22 December 2007 (aged 79); Tirana, Albania
- Occupation: Actor
- Years active: 1950–1990
- Awards: People's Artist

Xhanfise Keko (27 January 1928 – 22 December 2007), born in Gjirokastër, Albania, was an Albanian film director.

Keko was one of the seven founders of New Albania Film Studio (Albanian: Kinostudio Shqipëria e Re) (present-day Albafilm). She was the first female director and directed some 25 different movies between 1952 and 1984 including the 1975 film, Beni Walks by Himself and Tomka and His Friends, both awarded at the Giffoni International Film Festival. Her films were generally targeted toward younger audiences but contemporary critics praise her "sensitive approach to her material, a technical facility outstripping her contemporaries and a highly original voice".

== Early life ==
Xhanfise Çipi was born on 27 January 1928, in Gjirokastër.

== Career ==
In 1950, Keko was one of six Albanians, including her future husband Endri Keko, sent to study at the Moscow Central Studio for Documentary Film. Her education was focused on film editing. Keko edited 140 films, mostly newsreels and documentaries, in the first seventeen years of her career. She participated in the opening of Kinostudio by handing a pair of scissors to Enver Hoxha.

Keko's directorial debut, Spoiled Mimoza (Mimoza llastica), was made in 1973.

Her son Teodor Keko was born in 1958. Keko retired from filmmaking in 1984. Her husband and son died before her in 1989 and 2002 respectively.

== Filmography ==
- Taulanti kërkon një motër (1984)
- Një vonesë e vogël (1982)
- Kur xhirohej një film (1981)
- Partizani i vogël Velo (1980)
- Pas gjurmëve (1978)
- Tomka and His Friends (Albanian: Tomka dhe shokët e tij) (1977)
- Malësorët pas komisarëve (1976)
- Tinguj lufte (1976)
- Beni Walks by Himself (Albanian: Beni Ecën Vetë) (1975)
- Për popullin, me popullin (1975)
- Reportazh nga Tropoja (1975)
- Qyteti më i ri në botë (1974)
- Mimoza llastica (1973)
- Kongresi i 6 PPSH (1972)
- Kryengritje në pallat (1972)
- Shkolla tingujt ngjyra (1972)
- ABC...ZH (1971)
- Nga festivali artistik i fëmijve (1969)
- Kalitemi nepërmjet aksioneve (1968)
- Lart flamujt e aksioneve (1968)
- Ato çajnë përpara (1967)
- Gra heroike shqiptare përpara (1967)
- Miqësi e madhe unitet luftarak (1966)
- Tregim për njerzit e punës (1963)
- Kongresi i 3 i PPSH (1952)

== Works cited ==
- Williams, Bruce (2020). "Cinema in the 'local perfect position': children and education in the documentary work of Xhanfise Keko". Studies in Eastern European Cinema. 11 (1). Taylor & Francis: 54–66.
- Williams, Bruce (2015). "It's a wonderful job: women at work in the cinema of communist Albania". Studies in Eastern European Cinema. 6 (1). Taylor & Francis: 4–20.
