= Roland Trebicka =

Albanian actor (1947–2013)

- Born: 13 January 1947; Korçë, Albania
- Died: 6 March 2013 (aged 66); Tirana, Albania
- Occupation: Actor
- Years active: 1961–2013
- Awards: Merited Artist

Roland Trebicka (13 January 1947 – 6 March 2013) was an Albanian actor. He was the recipient of the Merited Artist of Albania recognition known for his great performance in Albanian films and theaters, mostly for his famous role as Jovan Bregu in the famous comedy Pallati 176.

== Biography ==
Roland Trebicka was born in Korçë, southern Albania in 1947. After pursuing secondary studies at the Raqi Qirinxhi, in his birthplace, he started to work at the professional Estrada (a variety show troupe) of the Cultural Center of the Armed Forces of Albania (SHQUP - Shtëpia Qendrore e Ushtrisë Popullore), or otherwise called the Estrada of the Soldier (Estrada e Ushtarit). During those years, it was in the various Estrada of the Albanian cities that many actors, Aleko Prodani, Koço Devole, Zef Deda, Mehdi Male, Behar Mera etc., who later would become famous, would have their debuts. In 1971 Trebicka joined the National Theatre of Albania (then known as Teatri popullor). He worked in the theatre until 1999. After a period of three years at the "Publimedia" company, Trebicka came back to the National Theatre.

He peaked with the comedy Pallati 176 and his role of Jovan Bregu. The show has appeared over 500 times, and has had a record of spectators, although it can be often seen on TV. In addition, Trebicka had the roles of Gennarino for the "Big Magic", Sganarel in Don Juan, Khlestakov in The Government Inspector, ecc.

The career of Trebicka in cinematography started with that of Kosta in the movie Debatik in 1961, when he was still a child. Other notable movies where he has participated are Ëndërr për një karrige (Vaska) dhe and Koncert në vitin 1936 (Nasi).

In 2011 Trebicka had a lung cancer which forced him to stay away from the scene for two years and played in the show Endrra e Ismail Qemalit (The dream of Ismail Qemali), of Spiro Duni. He came back for some more performances in early 2013, but died eventually from lung cancer on 6 March 2013.

He was Qytetar nderi (Honored citizen) in the city of Korçë, and also awarded with the Grand Master of Work award from the Albanian government.

== Roles in theatre and cinematography ==
Roles in theatre
Year	Title	Notes
2011	The lawyer's wedding	
2010	The barber of Seville	
2009	Everybody has vices	Comedy
2009	Time to get crazy	
1999	He is coming	
1994	8 persons plus	Comedy
1990	The "Titanic" walts	
1985	The Apartment Building Nr. 176	Comedy, (Jovan Bregu)

Roles in movies
Year	Title	Notes
2011 (?)	I want a liar	Comedy
2004	fans	Serial comedy
1996	Long sleep	Telecomedy
1984	Dreaming for a chair	(Vaska)
1979	The Radiostation	
1978	A Concert in the year 1936	(Nesti)
1961	DEBATIK	(Kosta)
