= Gëzim Erebara =

Gëzim Erebara (19 May 1929 – 12 February 2007) was an Albanian film director, screen player, translator and cinematography historian of the second half of the 20th century. He studied at the Prague Academy of Fine Arts in 1947–51 but was repatriated few months before graduation for political reasons by the then Communist Government of Albania. He worked in the state owned "Kinostudioja Shqiperia e Re" from 1957 to 1986 and authored or co-authored some of the most important movies.

== Filmography ==
- Debatik - (1961) co-authored
- Ngadhnjim mbi vdekjen - (1967) co-authored
- Guximtarët - (1970)
- Në fillim të verës - (1975)
- Pylli i lirisë - (1976)
- Vajzat me kordele të kuqe - (1978)
- Nusja - (1980)
- Një natë pa dritë - (1981)
- Fushë e blertë-fushë e kuqe - (1984)
- Një jetë më shumë - (1986)
