= Tish Daija =

Albanian composer

- Born: 30 January 1926; Shkodër, First Albanian Republic
- Died: 3 October 2003 (aged 77); Tirana, Albania
- Occupations: composer, footballer

Tish Daija (30 January 1926 – 3 October 2003) was an Albanian composer. He composed the first Albanian ballet Halili dhe Hajria (Halili and Hajria) that premiered on 13 January 1963 and has since been shown more than 250 times at the National Theatre of Opera and Ballet of Albania, a record for the Albanian Theatre. He has also composed Spring ("Pranvera"), an Albanian opera. Tish Daija is an alumnus of the Moscow Conservatory.

== Football career ==
Daija was also notable as a football player. He was part of Flamurtari before he dedicated himself to music, eventually becoming one of the Albanian Superliga top scorers in the Albanian Superliga in the 1948 national championship with 11 goals, tied to Zihni Gjinali of KS Dinamo Tirana.

== Filmography ==
Year	Film
1976	Tingujt e luftës
1972	Kryengritje në pallat
1966	Komisari i Dritës
1961	Debatik (film)
1957	Fëmijët e saj

== Personal life ==
Daija died at Tirana in 2003.
