= Qëndrim Rijani =

Albanian theatre director

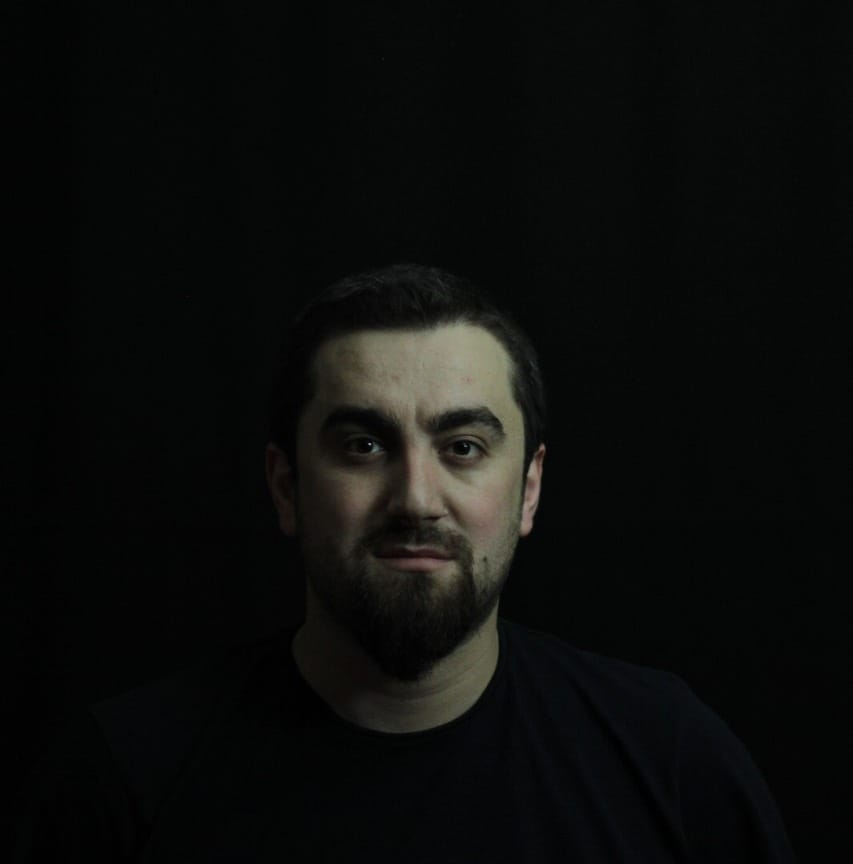
- Born: 30 March 1990 (age 36); Kichevo, North Macedonia
- Citizenship: North Macedonia, Albania
- Education: University of Arts, Tirana
- Occupations: theatre director, professor
- Years active: 2013–present

Qëndrim Rijani (english: Chendrim Rijani) is an Albanian director of theatre, film and opera. He has directed many plays, Albanian and foreign, that were performed in many countries in Europe and that have been honored with many awards in various festivals. His plays are characterised by his direct and rough style.

== Early life ==
Qëndrim Rijani was born on 30 March 1990 in Kichevo, North Macedonia. He attended elementary school and high school in his hometown. He got a theatre director degree in the University of Arts, Tirana. In this same university, he got his master's degree in Spectacle and Theatre Directing with his thesis called: "Kiçi dhe kthetrat e tij".

He has directed many successful Albanian and foreign plays that have been produced in Albania, North Macedonia Kosovo and Croatia.These plays have also been performed at theatrical festivals in several countries, including Bosnia and Herzegovina, Serbia, Russia, Switzerland, Turkey Hungary, Croatia and Bulgaria. Qëndrim Rijani brought to the audience the play “Xhelatët” (Hangmen), the opera “Skënderbeu” (Scanderbeg), the play "Артуро Уи" (The Resistible Rise of Arturo Ui),the play "Tri Motrat"(Three Sisters (play), the play "Makbethi" (The Tragedie of Macbeth), the play "На дното" (The Lower Depths) , the play "Julije Cezar" (The Tragedy of Julius Caesar) , the play Otello (Othello).

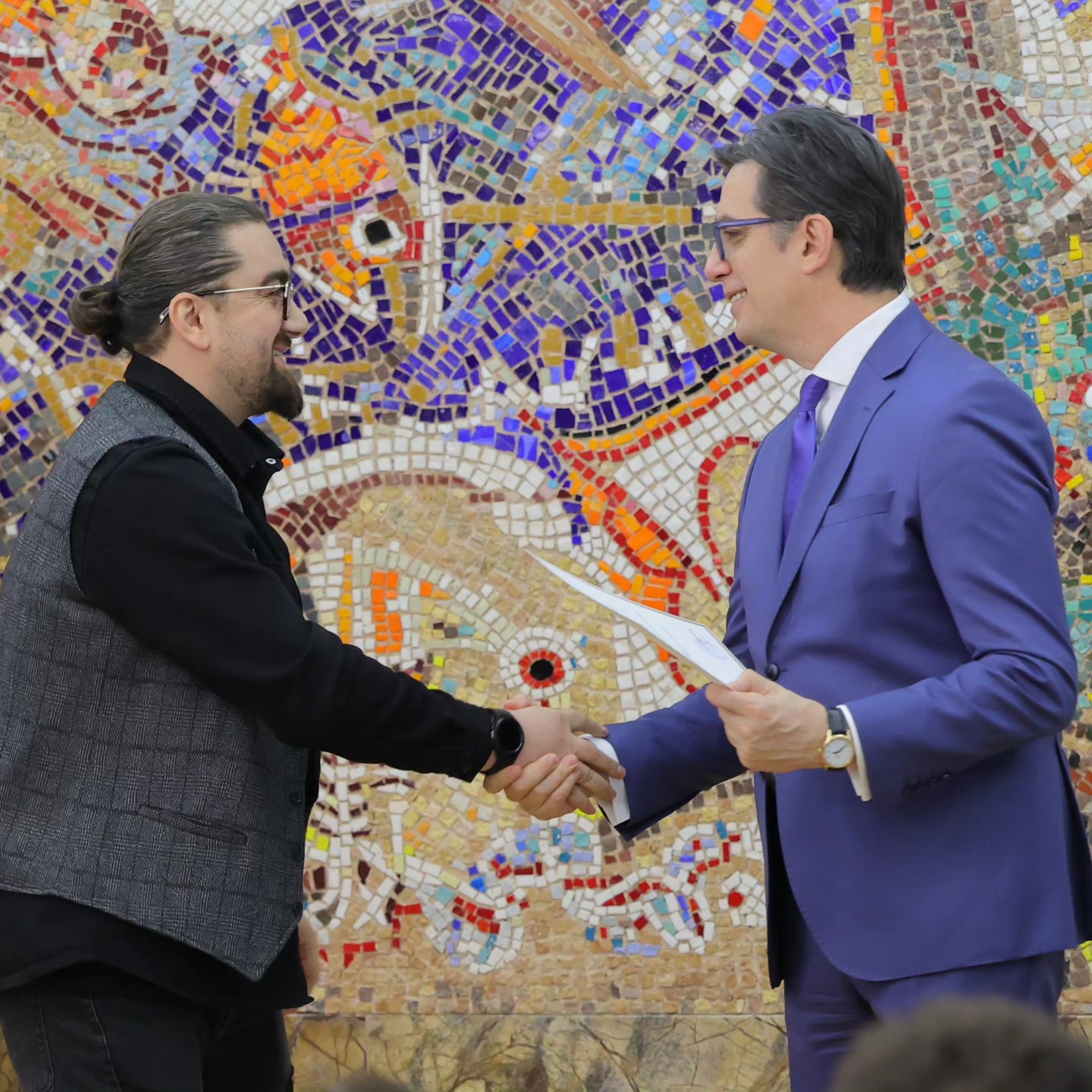
The director Qëndrim Rijani while receiving an award from the ex-president of the Republic of North Macedonia.

To this day, he has directed 31 plays in professional national and city theatres, one opera and three documentary films:

- “Ne vijmë për Ajër” (based on - Catastrophic Love Puzzles in Outer Space) - Scott O'Moore
- “Kapitulli i Dytë” (Chapter Two) - Neil Simon
- “Gjymtimi” (based on - A Behanding in Spokane) - Martin McDonagh
- “Doktor Shuster” (Doktor Šuster / Doctor Shoemaker) - Dušan Kovačević
- “Art” - Yasmina Reza
- “Gënjeshtër Pas Gënjeshtre” (The Lying Kind) - Anthony Neilson
- “Ushtria e Ui Tomasit” (based on - The Lieutenant of Inishmore) - Martin McDonagh
- “Shtëpia e Bernarda Albës” (The House of Bernarda Alba) - Federico Garcia Lorca
- “Darka e Thërrimeve” (Dinner of crumbs) - Refet Abazi
- “39 Hapat” (based on- The 39 Steps) - Alfred Hitchcock
- “Gratë” (based on- Huit femmes / Eight Women) - Robert Thomas
- “Roberto Xuko” (Roberto Zucco) - Bernard-Marie Koltès
- “Në Det” (Na pełnym morzu / Out at Sea) - Sławomir Mrożek
- "Jashtë Bie Borë" (...e fuori nevica! / And It's Snowing Outside) - Vincenzo Salemme
- "Xhelatët (Hangmen)" - Martin McDonagh
- "Opera për tre grosh" (The Threepenny Opera) - Bertolt Brecht
- "Plus 18" (based on Edmond) - David Mamet & Arian Krasniqi
- " Të Xhindosurit" (based on - Twelve Angry Men) - Reginald Rose
- "Fishkëllimë në Errësirë" (A Whistle in the Dark) - Tom Murphy
- "Tregtari i Venedikut" (The Merchant of Venice ) -William Shakespeare
- "Артуро Уи / Arturo Ui" (The Resistible Rise of Arturo Ui) -Bertold Brecht
- "Tri Motrat"(Three Sisters (play) -Anton Chekhov
- "Жени во собрание" (based on - Assemblywomen) -Aristophanes & Biljana Krajchevska
- "Tartufi" (Tartuffe)-Molière
- "На дното" (The Lower Depths) - Maxim Gorky
- "Makbethi" (The Tragedie of Macbeth) - William Shakespeare
- "Körler" (based on The Blind) - Maurice Maeterlinck & In the Name of Identity -Amin Maalouf
- "Julije Cezar" (The Tragedy of Julius Caesar) - William Shakespeare
- "Otello" (Othello) - William Shakespeare
- "Duke pritur Godonë" based on (Waiting for Godot) - Samuel Beckett
- "Животинска фарма" based on (Animal farm) - George Orwell

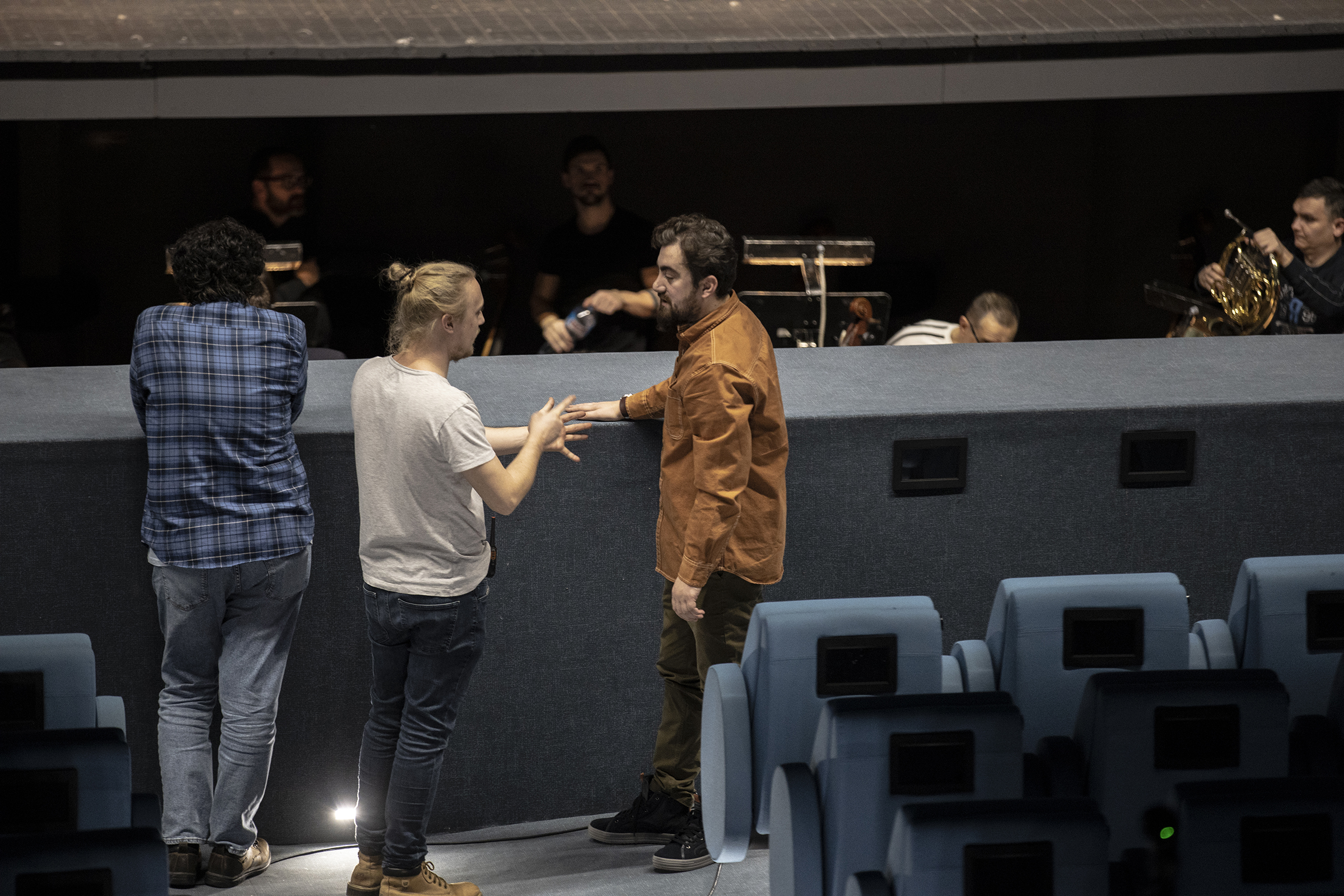
Qëndrim Rijani during a rehearsal of the opera "Skënderbeu" (Scanderbeg) in the National Theatre of Opera and Balet of the Republic of North Macedonia.

== Opera ==
The opera “Skënderbeu” (Scanderbeg) is one of the most important works of Qëndrim Rijani as a director, on which he worked with the composer Fatos Lumani and the librettist Arian Krasniqi. This opera is the first Albanian opera in North Macedonia. This historical opera premiered at the national theater of the Macedonian Opera and Ballet on 23 December 2019.

== Filmography ==
Year	Documentary	Script	Director	Festivals	Awards	Ref.
2017	"Kokën Mbrapa"	Qëndrim Rijani	Qëndrim Rijani	/	/	
2021	"Në mundsh"	Based on "Kronikë në gurë": Ismail Kadare	Qëndrim Rijani	/	/	
2025	"Promised land"	Venko Andonoski	Qëndrim Rijani	4	2	

== Awards ==
His work has received over eighty awards, and he has earned seventeen individual awards as a director.

Year	Title	Author	Institution	City/Country	Festivals	Awards	Ref.
2013	"Ne vijmë për Ajër" Based on -Catastrophic Love Puzzles in Outer Space	Scott O. Moore	National theater	Tirana / AL	1	1	
2013	"Kapitulli i Dytë" (Chapter Two)	Neil Simon	Andon Zako Çajupi Theater	Korcha (Korçë) / AL	5	5	
2014	"Gjymtimi" Based on-A Behanding in Spokane	Martin McDonagh	National Albanian Theater	Skopje / RNM	6	6	
2015	"Doktor Shuster" (Doktor Šuster / Doctor Shoemaker)	Dušan Kovačević	Andon Zako Cajupi Theater	Korcha (Korçë) / AL	8	10	
2015	"Art"	Yasmina Reza	National Theater of Tetovo	Tetovo / RNM	3	1	
2015	"Gënjeshtër Pas Gënjeshtre" (The Lying Kind)	Anthony Neilson	National Experimental Theater	Tirana / AL	-	-	
2016	"Ushtria e Ui Tomasit" Based on-The Lieutenant of Inishmore	Martin McDonagh	National Theater of Tetovo	Tetovo / RNM	1	-	
2016	"Shtëpia e Bernarda Albës" (The House of Bernarda Alba)	Federico Garcia Lorca	Andon Zako Cajupi Theater	Korcha (Korçë) / AL	1	-	
2016	"Darka e Thërrimeve" (Dinner of crumbs)	Refet Abazi	National Albanian theater	Skopje / RNM	3	4	
2017	"39 Hapat" Based on- The 39 Steps	Alfred Hitchcock	Metropol Theater	Tirana / AL	1	3	
2017	"Gratë" Based on-Huit femmes / Eight Women	Robert Thomas	National Albanian Theater	Skopje / RNM	7	16	
2018	"Roberto Xuko" (Roberto Zucco)	Bernard-Marie Koltès	Bekim Fehmiu Theater	Prizen / RKS	1	-	
2018	"Në Det" (Na pełnym morzu / Out at Sea)	Sławomir Mrożek	National Albanian Theater	Kumanovo / RNM	1	-	
2018	"Jashtë Bie Borë" (...e fuori nevica! / And It's Snowing Outside)	Vincenzo Salemme	National Theater of Tetovo	Tetovo / RNM	7	4	
2019	"Xhelatët" (Hangmen)	Martin McDonagh	National theater	Tirana / AL	-	-	
2019	"Skënderbeu" (The Opera Scanderbeg)	Librettist:Arian Krasniqi Composer: Fatos Lumani	Nacional Macedonian Opera and Ballet Theater	Skopje / RNM	-	-	
2020	"Opera për tre grosh" (The Threepenny Opera)	Bertolt Brecht	Nacional Theater of Tetovo	Tetovo / RNM	-	-	
2021	"Plus 18" Based on Edmond	David Mamet & Arian Krasniqi	Theater Hadi Shehu	Gjakovë / RKS	2	2	
2021	"Të Xhindosurit" Based on- Twelve Angry Men	Reginald Rose	National Theater of Gostivar	Gostivar / RNM	1	1	
2021	"Fishkëllimë në Errësirë" (A Whistle in the Dark)	Tom Murphy	National theater	Kumanovo / RNM	-	-	
2022	"Tregtari i Venedikut" (The Merchant of Venice )	William Shakespeare	Andon Zako Cajupi Theater	Korcha (Korçë) / AL	3	2	
2022	"Артуро Уи" (The Resistible Rise of Arturo Ui)	Bertolt Brecht	National Theater of Bitola	Bitola / RNM	1	5	
2022	"Tri Motrat" (Three Sisters (play)	Anton Chekhov	National Albanian Theater	Skopje / RNM	1	3	
2023	"Жени во собрание" Based on-Assemblywomen	Aristophanes & Biljana Krajchevska	National Theater of Comedy	Skopje / RNM	2	1	
2023	"Tartufi "(Tartuffe)	Molière	Theater of Gjilan	Gjilan / RKS	1	5	
2024	"На дното" (The Lower Depths)	Maxim Gorky	National Theater of Bitola	Bitola / RNM	1	1	
2024	"Makbethi "(The Tragedie of Macbeth)	William Shakespeare	National Theater of Kosova	Pristina / RKS	-	-	
2024	"Körler" based on The Blind & In the Name of Identity	Maurice Maeterlinck & Amin Maalouf	National Turkish Theater	Skopje / RNM	7	8	
2025	Julije Cezar (The Tragedy of Julius Caesar)	William Shakespeare	Hrvatsko narodno kazalište Split -Splitsko Ljeto / Croatian National Theater Split - Split Summer Festival	Split / HR	1	1	
2026	Otello (Othello)	William Shakespeare	National Theater of Albania	Tirana / AL	-	-	
2026	"Duke pritur Godonë" based on Waiting for Godot	Samuel Beckett	National Theater of Kumanovo	Kumanovo/RNM	2	1	
2026	"Животинска фарма" based on Animal farm	George Orwell	National Theater of Prilep	Prilep/RNM	-	-	

== Personal Awards ==
Besides the awards won by plays in festival, Qëndrim Rijani has also received these yearly awards for his work as a theater director. Including awards such as "Director of the Year" in Albania, "Director of the Year" in North Macedonia, the "Performance of the Year" award in Kosovo, the "Vojdan Chernodrinski" award for the best direction (won twice, in 2022 and 2025), the "Moisiu" award for the best direction and the best performance. Additionally, he was named the "Artist of the Year" by the Presidential Office of Republic of North Macedonia".

Year	Award	Presented by
2015	Achievement of the Year in Stage Arts	Milingona e artë
2016	Director of the Year	Akademia Kult
2021	Performance of the Year	Ministry of Culture of the Republic of Kosovo
2022	Vojdan Chernodrinski	Theater Festival "Vojdan Chernodrinski"
2022	Moisiu	Theater Festival "Aleksandër Moisiu"
2022	Artist of the Year	Presidential Office of the Republic of North Macedonia
2025	Vojdan Chernodrinski	Theater Festival "Vojdan Chernodrinski"
