= Ilir Butka =

Albanian painter

- Born: 1965 (age 60–61)
- Occupation: film director

Ilir Butka, born 1965 is a painter, film director and producer. He graduated the Albanian Academy of Arts in Tirana, Albania. Currently he is serving as Chairman of the Albanian National Centre of Cinematography, the official institution representing the Albanian cinema.

== Career ==
=== Artistic Experience ===
Exhibitions – Painting, video art, installations

- 2024 “DICHOTOMY“ Personal exhibition FAB GALLERY, Tirana, Albania.
- 2024 “ROADS V” Collective exhibition realized with the works of lecturers of the Faculty of Fine Arts
- 2022 “PARALLEL LIFE” - Exhibition of 12 Albanian artists. “Vilson Kilica” Art Gallery, Fier.
- 2011 CONTEMPORARY ART EXHIBITION FROM ALBANIA, Kaunas Communication History Museum, Galeria Miejska BWA Bydgoszcz (Poland).
- 2011 Painting exhibition – “MJEDIS” – Collective Tirana, Albania.
- 2011 Collective exhibition “My Odissey, Art in Myth”, contemporary works exhibition, Tirana, Albania.
- 2007 Collective exhibition in NATIONAL GALLERY OF ART, “SPRING”, (Video installation), Curatorial project by CHARLES DANBY- Tirana, ALBANIA.
- 2003 Collective exhibition in “Galeria e Vogel”, “Passport” – (Video installation) Tirana, Albania.
- 2001 Painting exhibition – “STRUKTURE” – Collective (Video Installation) Tirana, Albania. 1995 Winner of the 3-rd Prize in the National Painting exhibition “ONUFRI” – National Gallery of Arts, Tirana, Albania.
- 1995 Applicative Art Exhibition – National Gallery of Arts, Tirana, Albania.
- 1994 Arte Fiera Mostra Internazionale d’ Arte Contemporanea “Four artists from Albania” Bologna, Italy.
- 1993 Golden Medal in competition of Artistic Photography. Savona, Italy.
- 1993 Painting exhibition – Collective “Grafica” Galeria Cona. Savona, Italy.
- 1992 Workshop with artists from Italy, Spain, France, Cyprus, Slovenia, etc. – Perugia, Italy.
- 1992 Painting exhibition – Collective “Artists of Albania”. Albisola, Italy.
- 1992 Painting exhibition – Collective “Out Of Silhouette”. Savona, Italy.
- 1991 Settled in Italy and continues his artistic activity making knowledge of new forms and techniques of artistic expression: ceramics, photography, computer generated graphics.
- 1990 Collective painting spring exhibition, National Gallery of Arts, Tirana, Albania.
- 1985 – 1989 Bachelor Degree, Academy of Arts, Tirana, Painting / Art Director (Set designing).

=== Professional experience ===
- 2024 – MAN OF THE HOUSE (movie by Andamion Murataj) - Associate Producer
- 2021 – until now University of Arts - Lecturer on Photography at the Faculty of Fine Arts
- 2020 - 2023 Head of Tirana Film Office
- 2017 - until now founder and board member of the Balkan Film Market
- 2014 - 2019 – Chairman of the Albanian National Centre of Cinematography.
- 2011 – Producer of “LA NAVE DOLCE” – directed by Daniele Vicari, (winner of critics award “PASINETI Prize” at Venice Film Festival).
- 2009 – While engaged with “Ska-ndal Production” he successfully produced movies such as “HONEYMOONS” – directed by Goran Paskalievic, (“GOLDEN Spike” award, as well as the FIPRESCI Award, the international jury of film critics, winner at Valladolid Film Festival, Best Film for Central & Eastern European at Cleveland International Film Festival, “Les Arcs European Film Festival”, Prix du Jury, winner of The Public Choice Awards at Thessaloniki International Film Festival).
- 2007- Director, scriptwriter and producer of the documentary “DAMAREAMARE”.
- 2006 - 2008 - Member of the board of Albanian National Centre of Cinematography
- 2005 – 2014 Academy of Arts / University of Arts - Lecturer on film editing at the Faculty of Filmmaking.
- 2005 - 2009 - Chairman of the “Fan Noli” Foundation
- 2003 – Curator at MARUBI, most important international photography contest in Albania, organised by National Gallery of Arts
- 2003 – Founder of the Tirana International Film Festival (TIFF), the first international film festival in Albania. He acted as TIFF Festival Director until 2014.
- 2004 - President of the board of Albanian Art Institute (A private institution that aims at cultivating and promoting art and Albanian culture creating a favourable and stimulating environment for the national art)
- 2003 - President of the board of FAMA, Foundation Art Media Albania (Organisation of a cultural activities among which the International Short Film Festival of Tirana)
- 2002 – Director, scriptwriter and producer of the short movie “TUNNEL”.
- 2000 – Founder and President of the Albania Film Commission
- 2000 Producer for the shooting in Albania of the Italian movie “Hotel Dajti” production of “Caviar Studio”, Italy.
- 1998-2005 Founder, Creative Director and Producer at FASADA STUDIOS, the very first audio-video production company established in Albania.
- 1996 - Academy of Arts / University of Arts - Lector on new forms of communication and expression: - Artistic photography and Computer graphics
- 1989 – 1991 Painter and film director on animated films at “Kinostudio Shqipëria e Re”
