= Dhimitër Orgocka =

Albanian actor (1936–2021)

- Born: 24 October 1936; Korçë, Albania
- Died: 1 January 2021 (aged 84); Korçë, Albania
- Occupation: Actor
- Years active: 1958–2021
- Spouse: Dhorkë Orgocka (m. ?–2002)
- Children: 2
- Awards: People's Artist

Dhimitër Orgocka (24 October 1936 – 1 January 2021) was an Albanian actor and director. He appeared in hundred theatrical plays at Andon Zako Çajupi Theatre as well as in Albanian cinematography since 1960s with the role of Uran in Horizonte të hapura (1968).

== Personal life ==
He was born in 1936 in Korçë, Albania, when Zog I was King of Albania, and graduated in the Faculty of Albanian Language in the University of Tirana. He was married to Dhorkë Orgocka, a Merited Artist of Albania actress.

Orgocka died from a cerebral hemorrhage, on 1 January 2021, at the age of 84.

== Working career ==
Orgocka started to work as a director right after school in the Andon Zako Çajupi theater of Korçë, in which he directed around 100 premières.

His first role as an actor was that of Gjergj in the "Great Love" (Albanian: Dashuria e madhe) drama from Fatmir Gjata, whereas his first work as a director was that of "The house on the lane" (Albanian: Shtëpia në rrugicë) from Teodor Laço. He also acted in movies such as in "The Gramaphone General" (Albanian: Gjeneral gramafoni), and "Nothing can be forgotten" (Albanian: Asgjë nuk harrohet).

== Awards ==
He was a recipient of the following national and international awards:

- People's Artist of Albania
- Best role for the monodrama Amok from Stephan Zweig (in the 8th Festival of Theaters in Kyiv, Ukraine, 2005)
- Best role for the monodrama Amok from Stephan Zweig (in the Festival of International Theaters in Bitola and Macedonia, 2005).
- Grand Prize Sulejman Pitarka for directing the drama "Dhëndër për Kristinën" of Skënder Demollit in the 5th festival of the Albanian Theaters (in Macedonia, "Dibra 2006").
- Cup of Festival for the monodrama Amok from Stephan Zweig (in the international festival of Monodramas në Vroslav, Poland 2007)

== Recognition ==
In 2007, The House of Culture of Maliq was named after him, "Dhimitër Orgocka House of Culture".
