= Drita Albanian Folk Orchestra =

Drita Albanian Folk Orchestra is an Albanian folk orchestra based in Los Angeles, California. It was established in 1982 by Ian Price and presents to the American audience traditional Albanian music. The orchestra uses instruments common in Albanian folk music and may include the Albanian clarinet, accordion, violin, tambourine, Lahutë, Çifteli, lute, pipes and flute etc.

The word, "drita," means "light" in the Albanian language, and does have that meaning in the group's name.

The orchestra has performed concerts in Los Angeles, San Diego, Berkeley, Chicago and New York City.

== Group ==
- Linda Levin
- Letitia Lucca
- Sue Rudnicki
- Rob Stokes
- Joe Carson
- Ian Price
