= Dhorkë Orgocka =

Albanian actress (1937–2002)

- Born: 25 October 1937; Korçë, Albania
- Died: 31 August 2002 (aged 64); Tirana, Albania
- Occupation: Actress
- Years active: 1953–2002
- Spouse: Dhimiter Orgocka (m. ?–2002)
- Children: 2
- Awards: Merited Artist

Dhorkë Orgocka (25 October 1937 – 31 August 2002) was an Albanian actress. She was best known for her work as a member of Andon Zako Çajupi Theatre since the 1950s, as one of the first performers on stage.

== Biography ==
She was born in Korçë. From the age of 16, she was active with the amateur troupe of orçë Theatre as a dramatic and comic actress, as a singer as a dancer. In 1951 she was one of the first female actresses of Albanian professional theatre. She appeared in drama, comedy and variety films.

Orgocka was married to Albanian actor and director Dhimitër Orgocka until her death. She died in Tirana on 31 August 2002. She was buried in Korçë, and was survived by her husband and two sons.

== Honors ==
She received the award of Merited Artist of Albania for her contribution in film and theatre. A road in Tirana and Korçë bears her name.

== Filmography ==
- Perseri Pranvere (1987) - Nena e Lindes
- Nje vit i gjate (1987) - Nena e Likurgut
- Asgje nuk harrohet (1985) - Nene Xhikua
- Pas Gjurmeve (1978) - Drita
- Flamure ne dallge (1977) - Erisi
- Perballimi (1976) - Mara
- Beni ecen vete (1975) - Teto Ollga
- Horizonte te hapura (1968) - Gruaja e Uranit
