= Pandi Raidhi =

Albanian actor (1921–1999)

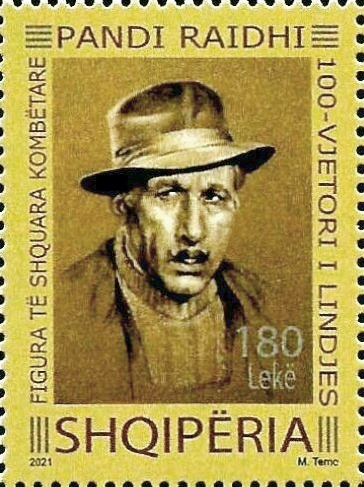
- Raidhi on a 2022 stamp of Albania
- Born: 11 April 1921; Korçë, Principality of Albania
- Died: 18 July 1999 (aged 82); Tirana, Albania
- Occupation: Actor
- Years active: 1950–1998
- Awards: People's Artist

Pandi Raidhi (14 April 1921 – 18 July 1999) was an Albanian actor, and recipient of the People's Artist of Albania recognition. Raidhi was mostly known for his performance since the 50s in theater and films, as well as for his comic role of Uncle Bako in The Lady From The City and its sequel.

== Biography ==
Raidhi was born on 14 April 1921 in Korçë in southern Albania. He started his artistic career on July 11, 1937, in the variety show Dasma Korçare (Wedding of Korçë), where he conquested the public immediately.

Raidhi participated in the National Liberation Movement as part of the Anti-Fascist Youth organization, and afterwards, in 1948 after finishing high school he entered the National Theatre of Albania. In 1950 he returned to the Andon Zako Çajupi Theatre of Korçë where he would subsequently spend 40 years of acting.

He debuted in cinematography in the movie Tana of 1958. Furthermore, he would interpret in another 36 roles. Overall Raidhi has interpreted in around 200 roles in drama, comedies, operettas and movies.

Raidhi died in Berat on 11 July 1999.

== Honors ==
In 1975 Raidhi was given the highest award to be bestowed to artists, the People's Artist of Albania award. A street of Tirana bears his name.

== Filmography ==
Raidhi has participated in the following movies:

- Njerëz në rrymë – (1989)
- Familja ime – (1987) ...Tasi
- Përsëri pranverë – (1987) ...Uncle Tasi
- Rrethimi i vogël – (1986) ...Comrade Meti
- Duaje emrin tënd – (1984) ...Thoma
- Kush vdes në këmbë – (1984) ...Village's priest
- Nëntori i dytë – (1982) ...Demir Arbana
- Shoqja nga fshati – (1980)...Uncle Bako Këmbora
- Partizani i vogël Velo – (1980) ...Bani of Duke
- Agimet e stinës së madhe (1981) ...Sharko Sheqi
- Liri a vdekje – (1979) ...Çarçani
- Ne vinim nga lufta – (1979)
- Flamur në dallgë – (1977) (TV)
- Përballimi – (1976)...Pllaton Burbuqi
- Monumenti – (1976)...Llambro Leka
- Tokë e përgjakur – (1976)
- Zonja nga qyteti – (1976)...Uncle Bako Këmbora
- Beni ecën vetë – (1975)... Uncle Thoma
- Rrugicat që kërkonin diell – (1975) ...Jorgo, Cafeteria's owner
- Shpërthimi – (1974)...Lajmja
- Shtigje të luftës – (1974) ...Shaban's father
- Krevati i perandorit – (1973) ...Meke the partisan
- Yjet e netëve të gjata – (1972) ...Ago Beqo
- Kur zbardhi një ditë – (1971) ...Uncle Loni
- Mëngjeze lufte – (1971) ...Raqi Teneqenxhiu
- I teti ne bronz – (1970) ...The miller
- Horizonte të hapura – (1968) ...Uncle Ymer
- Ngadhënjim mbi vdekjen – (1967) ...Uncle Telo
- Vitet e para – (1965) ...Kasëm
- Tana – (1958)
