= Agim Krajka =

Albanian composer (1937–2021)

- Born: 1 May 1937; Kavajë, Albania
- Died: 1 March 2021 (aged 83); Tirana, Albania
- Awards: Merited Artist

Agim Krajka (1 May 1937 – 1 March 2021) was an Albanian composer. He was known as one of the greatest masters of music at that time.

== Biography ==
He was born on 1 May 1937, in the small city of Kavajë, Albania to a family from Debar, present day North Macedonia. Krajka began his musical career at the Pioneer Palace in Tirana sometime in the early 1950s where he learned accordion, the musical instrument for which he was to become famous. He went on to study composition at the State Conservatory in Tirana between 1963 and 1968. Known for his close collaboration with singer Vaçe Zela, he authored two of her most well-known songs, Lemza and Djaloshi dhe Shiu. He also composed music for several films such as "Zonja nga Qyteti", "Udha e Shkronjave".. etc. He was awarded Albania's Merited People's Artist prize for his long contribution to music. He received the "Honor of the Nation" Decoration.

Krajka died on 1 March 2021, aged 83 from COVID-19.
