= Rajmonda Bulku =

Albanian actress and former politician (born 1958)

Member of the Albanian parliament
- In office 2009–2013

Personal details
- Born: 16 August 1958 (age 67) Cërrik, Albania
- Party: Democratic Party

Rajmonda Bulku (born 16 August 1958) is an Albanian actress and former politician of Democratic Party of Albania. She appeared in numerous films and theatres as well as Zonja nga Qyteti, Duaje emrin tënd, Të Paftuarit, Vitet e pritjes, Kthimi i Ushtrisë së vdekur and Vdekja e kalit.

== Career ==
Bulku's first part was in the movie Dimri i fundit, but it was her second movie, The Lady from the City, that gained her a national praise. She went on to play in several other movies and is currently artistically active.

In the 1990s she also started a career as politician and became a member of the parliament, representing the Democratic Party of Albania.

Bulku appeared on stage during Albania’s performance of “Nan” at the Eurovision Song Contest 2026 alongside Alis.

== Filmography ==
- Kafeja e fundit - (2010)
- Familjet - (2009)
- Etjet e Kosovës - (2006)
- Omiros - (2005)
- Tirana, viti zero - (2001)
- Nekrologji - (1994)
- Vdekja e kalit - (1992)
- Vitet e pritjes - (1990)
- Një djalë edhe një vajzë - (1990)....Mesuese Matilda
- Ngjyrat e moshës - (1990)
- Kthimi i ushtrisë së vdekur - (1989)....Bashkeshortja e Kontit Dizzetta
- Muri i gjallë - (1989)
- Binarët - (1987) E fejuara e Kujtimit
- Vrasje ne gjueti - (1987)
- Dhe vjen një ditë - (1986)....Klara
- Gabimi - (1986) Mamaja e Martinit
- Te paftuarit - (1985)....Diana
- Duaje emrin tënd - (1984)....Jona
- Kërcënimi - (1981)....Ema
- Shoqja nga fshati - (1980)....Meli
- Ballë për ballë - (1979)
- Emblema e dikurëshme - (1977)....Mesuesja
- Gunat përmbi tela - (1977)
- Nusja dhe shtetrrethimi - (1977)....Shpresa
- Zonja nga qyteti - (1976)...Meli
- Dimri i fundit - (1976)
