= Pioneers of Enver =

Youth communist organization from Albania

The Pioneers of Enver Hoxha Pionierët e Enverit
- Founded: 10 February 1942
- Dissolved: 1991
- Headquarters: Tirana, Albania
- Ideology: Communism; Marxism–Leninism; Stalinism; Hoxhaism; Anti-revisionism
- Mother party: Party of Labour
- International affiliation: ICCAM

The Pioneers of Enver (Albanian: Pionierët e Enverit, literally The Pioneers of Enver Hoxha) was a pioneer movement functioning in Albania during its communist period. Formed as Debatik, an acronym for United Boys of Communist Ideas (Albanian: Djemtë E Bashkuar Anëtarë Të Ideve Komuniste) on 10 February 1942, the movement continued as Organization of Pioneers (Albanian: Organizata e Pionierëve). After the Second World War, it was supervised by the Labour Youth Union of Albania, the youth wing of the Party of Labour of Albania.

== History ==
The organization started as Debatik, an acronym for United Boys of Communist Ideas (Albanian: Djemtë E Bashkuar Anëtarë Të Ideve Komuniste) on 10 February 1942, and continued as Organization of Pioneers (Albanian: Organizata e Pionierëve) after World War II. In 1985, after the death of the communist leader Enver Hoxha, it was renamed as Pioneers of Enver (Albanian: Pionierët e Enverit, literally The Pioneers of Enver Hoxha). It effectively ended with the fall of communism in Albania in 1991.

The association created activities for children up to 14 years old, was in charge of the summer Pioneer camps of Albania, organised the pioneers palaces and their yearly national music, language, literature, and painting competitions, and published two magazines, the scientific Horizonti, and the two, more generalistic, Pionieri, for ages 8–14.

The organisation affected the school life and academic development of children. Children, at their 8th or 9th year of age, needed to say an admission pledge in order to be accepted in the organization. The organisation within a school would hold elections among them to choose the children school leaders.

== In media ==
Debatik, a 1961 movie, is a fictional production, dedicated to the creation of the organization in 1942. Guximtarët, a 1970 movie, describes pioneer summer camps and pioneer mountaineering. Shoku ynë Tili, a 1981 production, described how the organization would affect children's lives academically and socially.
