= Drita Pelingu =

Albanian actress (1926–2013)

- Born: Drita Kripa; 3 December 1926; Vlorë, First Albanian Republic
- Died: 2 October 2013 (aged 86); Tirana, Albania
- Other name: Drita Pelinku
- Occupation: Actress
- Years active: 1945–2013
- Spouse: Hysen Pelingu (died 1997)
- Awards: People's Artist Merited Artist

Drita Pelingu (née: Kripa; 3 December 1926 – 2 October 2013) was an Albanian actress and director. Appreciated for her numerous roles in Albanian cinema, she has been honored and awarded with the title of People's Artist and Merited Artist of Albania.

== Life and career ==
Pelingu was born on December 3, 1926 in Vlore as Drita Kripa. When she arrived in the capital, the essential thing was the purity, of the voice, the depth through reason, which can be pledged by the power of talent, she was the first girl to be educated in the fascinating art of drama, under the advice of Mio. Arriving in 1946, she found herself a professional theater actress, while she was in the pedagogical school with studies. She completed the 3-year course, actress-director.

As an actress of theater and cinema, she has played over 150 roles, more than half of which are leading female roles in national and world dramaturgy. As one of the founders of the National Theater, she has made an important contribution as the author of many biographical publications for artists of the Albanian stage. For her special contributions, Drita Pelinku was awarded by the President of the Republic the order "Grand Master", the "Career Award" and also the title "Merited Artist" (1986), the "Ismail Qemali" award (1996), while the Board of Directors of the American Biographical Institute has selected her among the 500 most influential leaders in the world. Recently, her hometown has honored her as an Honorary Citizen of Vlora and the President of the Republic has awarded her the highest title "Honor of the Nation".

== Personal life and death ==
She was married with actor Hysen Peling until his death in 1997. She died following a long illness on 2 October 2013, aged 86, in Tirana.

== Filmography ==
- Tana (1958) - Nusja Myslimane
- Gjenerali i Ushtrise së vdekur (1976) - Gruaja e Gjeneralit
- Njeriu me Top (1977) - Hallë Esmaja
- Vjaza me Kordele të Kuqe (1978) - Zonja Kavalero
- Kur Hidheshin Themelet (1978) - Budja
- Radiostacioni (1979) - Zonja Mukadez
- Përtej Mureve të Ngurta (1979) - Nëna e Ramizit
- K
- Nusja (1980) - Nëna
- Shtëpia Jonë e Përbashkët (1981) - Vita
- Era e Ngrohtë e Thellësive (1983) - Nëna e Benit
- Fjalë Pa Fund (1986) - Nëna e Bardhylit
- Shpresa (1988) - Nëna e Pirros
- Sekretet (2008) - Nëna e Landit
