= Nik Xhelilaj =

Albanian actor (born 1983)

- Born: Kreshnik Xhelilaj; 5 March 1983 (age 43); Tirana, Albania
- Other name: Nik Xhelilaj
- Education: University of Arts
- Occupation: Actor
- Years active: 2005–present

Kreshnik Xhelilaj (born 5 March 1983), known professionally as Nik Xhelilaj, is an Albanian actor.

He began his international career with the film The Sorrow of Mrs. Schneider, directed by Piro Milkani and Eno Milkani, and has starred in three critically acclaimed Albanian films, two of which were included in the List of Albanian submissions for the Academy Award for Best Foreign Language Film in 2008 and 2009. Nik has won several "Best Actor" awards at various international film festivals.

== Biography ==
Nik Xhelilaj was born on 5 March 1983 in Tirana to a family originally from Southern Albania, specifically the Labëria region, with his father coming from Vlorë and his mother from Tepelenë. Both of his parents are high military officers by profession. So, at the age of 14, also thanks to his father's interest, he went to Istanbul to attend the military high school. But his new way did not last more than 4 months and he decided to give up the military career and return to Albania.

=== 2003–2008: Early career and The Sorrow of Mrs. Schneider ===
Nik originally wanted to pursue a career in law, but failed to win a place at university in the qualifying round. While waiting for the next round in the following year, he became interested in acting and started attending acting classes. Eventually he got involved with other young artists in the Sirea Film projects, with film directors Leonard Bombaj and Alfred Trebicka, who advised him to apply to the Academy of Arts.

In 2003, at the age of 20, Nik entered the Academy of Arts to study acting. In 2004, having just finished his freshman year, Nik was chosen by the experienced film director Pirro Milkani to play the lead role of Lekë Seriani in the film The Sorrow of Mrs. Schneider (Albanian: Trishtimi i zonjës Shnajder), which had strong autobiographical elements. The plot itself dealt generally with the life of director Milkani in the 1960s, during his studies in the then Czechoslovakia. Although he didn't speak any Czech, the young actor memorised his Czech lines for the whole film and learned how to pronounce them. It was also here that he became widely known by his stage name or nickname Nik, as the film's producers found the Albanian name Kreshnik difficult to pronounce and suggested a shorter version. The film was released in 2008 and was the Albanian submission for the Academy Award for Best Foreign Language Film that year, but was not nominated.

=== 2010: Dancing with the Stars ===
Xhelilaj was part of the first season of the reality show Dancing with the Stars, which took place between 18 February and 7 May 2010. The couple, consisting of the actor and professional dancer Olta Ahmetaj, were the fifth to be eliminated from the competition (out of 12 couples), thus forfeiting the first prize of €50,000.

== Filmography ==
=== Film ===
Year	Title	Role	Note
2008	The Sorrow of Mrs. Schneider	Lekë Seriani	Albanian-Czech film
2009	Alive	Koli	Albanian film
2010	The Albanian	Arben Shehu	German-Albanian film
2010	Filma të shkurtër 2010/2	Ernest	Albanian short film
2013	Real Playing Game	Young Boris	Portuguese film
2013	Üç Yol	Benjamin	Turkish-Bosnian film
2014	Seven Lucky Gods	Mehmet	British-Albanian film
2017	Zer	Jan	Kurdish film
2017	Distant Angels	Shpëtim	Albanian film
2017	Atila	Kujtim	Albanian short film
2018	Direniş Karatay	Börke	Turkish film
2018	Don't. Get. Out!	Falke	German film
2021	The Albanian Virgin	Flamur	Albanian film
2023	Policë për kokë	Maksimilian Murati	Albanian film
2024	Luna Park	Berti	Albanian film

=== Television ===
Year(s)	Title	Role	Note
2012–2013	Kayıp Şehir	Kadir	Turkish TV series
2014	Her Sevda Bir Veda	Yusuf	Turkish TV series
2016	Winnetou	Winnetou	German TV film
2017	4 Blocks	Shpend	German TV series
2017	The Last Emperor	Marco	Turkish TV series
2018	Nefes Nefese	Boran	Turkish TV series
2018	Milk & Honey	Arian	German TV series
2019	Alarm for Cobra 11 – The Highway Police	Timo	German TV series
2020	The Great Seljuks	Yorgos	Turkish TV series
2021	Wir Kinder vom Bahnhof Zoo	Dijan	German TV series
2022	Rise of Empires: Ottoman	Mahmud Pasha	Turkish Netflix series
2023	Balko Teneriffa	Drasko Jovanov	German TV series
2023–2024	Emanet	Firtina Poyraz	Turkish TV series
