= Violeta Manushi =

Albanian actress (1926–2007)

- Born: 6 March 1926; Voskopojë, First Albanian Republic
- Died: 26 July 2007 (aged 81); Tirana, Albania
- Occupation: Actress
- Years active: 1958–2005
- Awards: People's Artist

Violeta Manushi (6 March 1926 – 26 July 2007) was an Albanian actress, honored with the People's Artist of Albania. She was best known in Albania for her portrayal of Teto Ollga (Auntie Ollga), a symbolic character which followed her in all of her career.

== Career ==
Born in Voskopojë, Manushi studied at the Qemal Stafa High School, in Tirana, Albania.

She has played over 100 roles in the theater and 16 in cinema. In May 2004, she successfully returned to the stage of the National Theater with the tragicomedy The Shelter of the Forgotten.

Manushi never married or had any children. She died at the age of 81 at her home in Tirana, following a brief illness, on 26 July 2007.

== Early life ==
A former typist, at only 20 years old, she enrolled in the first drama school opened near the State Theater (now National Theater) in 1946. She immediately stood out for her authenticity, spontaneity, and natural talent, as well as her strong discipline and willpower. In the play Hours of the Kremlin (1957), she played three roles simultaneously, setting an original record that still stands.

She later excelled in leading roles in the comedies The Merry Wives of Windsor (1959) and The Morality of Mrs. Dulska (1958). From national drama, she successfully portrayed Olimbia in The Carnivals of Korçë (1964), Zyhra in The Second Face (1968), Nica in The General of the Dead Army (1971), Ollga in The Lady from the City (1975), and Aunt Rita in Palace 176 (1985), completely transforming herself into each character.

She also appeared in 16 films, from Tana (1958) to The Small Encirclement (1986). For her role as Auntie Ollga in The Lady from the City, she won the Film Festival Medallion in 1977.

== Filmography ==
- Trishtimi i zonjës Shnajder (2008) (released posthumously)
- Valsi i Titanikut (1990)
- Eja! (1987)
- Rrethimi i vogël (1986)
- Pallati 176 (1985)
- Taulanti kërkon një motër (1984)
- Një vonesë e vogël (1983)
- Përtej mureve të gurta (1981)
- Një shoqe nga fshati (1980)
- Zemrat që nuk plaken (1977)
- Zonja nga qyteti (1976)
- Gjenerali i ushtrisë së vdekur (1975)
- Mimoza llastica (1973)
- Gjurma (1970)
- Plagë të vjetra (1969)
- Përse bie kjo daulle (1969)
- Vitet e para (1965)
- Debatik (1961)
- Tana (1958)

== Theatrical plays ==
- Titanic Waltz
- Qypi me flori
- Epopeja e Ballit Kombëtar
- Dom Gjoni
- Pas vdekjes
- Halili dhe Hajria
- Tartufi
- Mikroborgjezët
- Rrënjët e thella
- Orët e Kremlinit
- Gjenerali i ushtrisë së vdekur
- Morali i zonjës Dulska
- Arturo Ui
- Lumi i vdekur
- Karnavalet e Korçës
- Zonja nga qyteti
- 14 vjeç dhëndër
- Epoka para gjyqit
- Borgjezi fisnik
- Fytyra e dytë
- Pallati 176
- Kati i gjashtë
