= Yllka Mujo =

Albanian actress

- Born: Yllka Muji; 15 October 1953 (age 72); Tirana, Albania
- Occupation: Actress
- Years active: 1970–present
- Spouse: Gjergj Polikron Zaharia (divorced)
- Children: Elia Zaharia; Amos Muji Zaharia
- Relatives: Agim Mujo (brother)
- Awards: Merited Artist

Yllka Mujo (born 15 October 1953) is an Albanian actress, especially known for her roles in Albanian movies during the communist regime. For her acting credits she was given the title Merited Artist of Albania.

== Life ==
Yllka Muji (or Mujo) comes from an Albanian family that moved from Tuz, Kingdom of Yugoslavia (now Montenegro), to Shkodër during the Monarchist period. She was born in the capital Tirana and was the sister of actor Agim Mujo (1955/1956–2019). In recognition to her career, she was also given the title of "Maestro of Arts" in the National Theatre of Albania.

Mujo married (now divorced) Haig Zaharinë then Gjergj Polikron Zaharia, an actor, born in Përmet, and had one son, Amos Muji Zaharia (b. 1987), an actor and film director; and one daughter, Elia Zaharia (b. 1983), an actress, former singer, and ex-wife of Leka, Crown Prince of Albania.

== Filmography ==
- I teti në bronz (1970)
- Malet me blerim mbuluar (1971)
- Beni ecën vetë (1975)
- Rrugicat që kërkonin diell (1975)
- Zonja nga qyteti (1976)
- Kur hidheshin themelet (1978)
- Taulanti kërkon një motër (1984)
- Rikonstruksioni (1988)
- Shpella e piratëvet (1990)
- Lettere al vento (2003)
- Lule të kuqe, lule të zeza (2003)
- Honeymoons (2009)
- Shqiptari (2010)
- Përballë (2015)
