= University of Arts, Tirana =

University in Tirana

Coordinates: 41°19′04″N 19°49′13″E

University of Arts
- Universiteti i Arteve
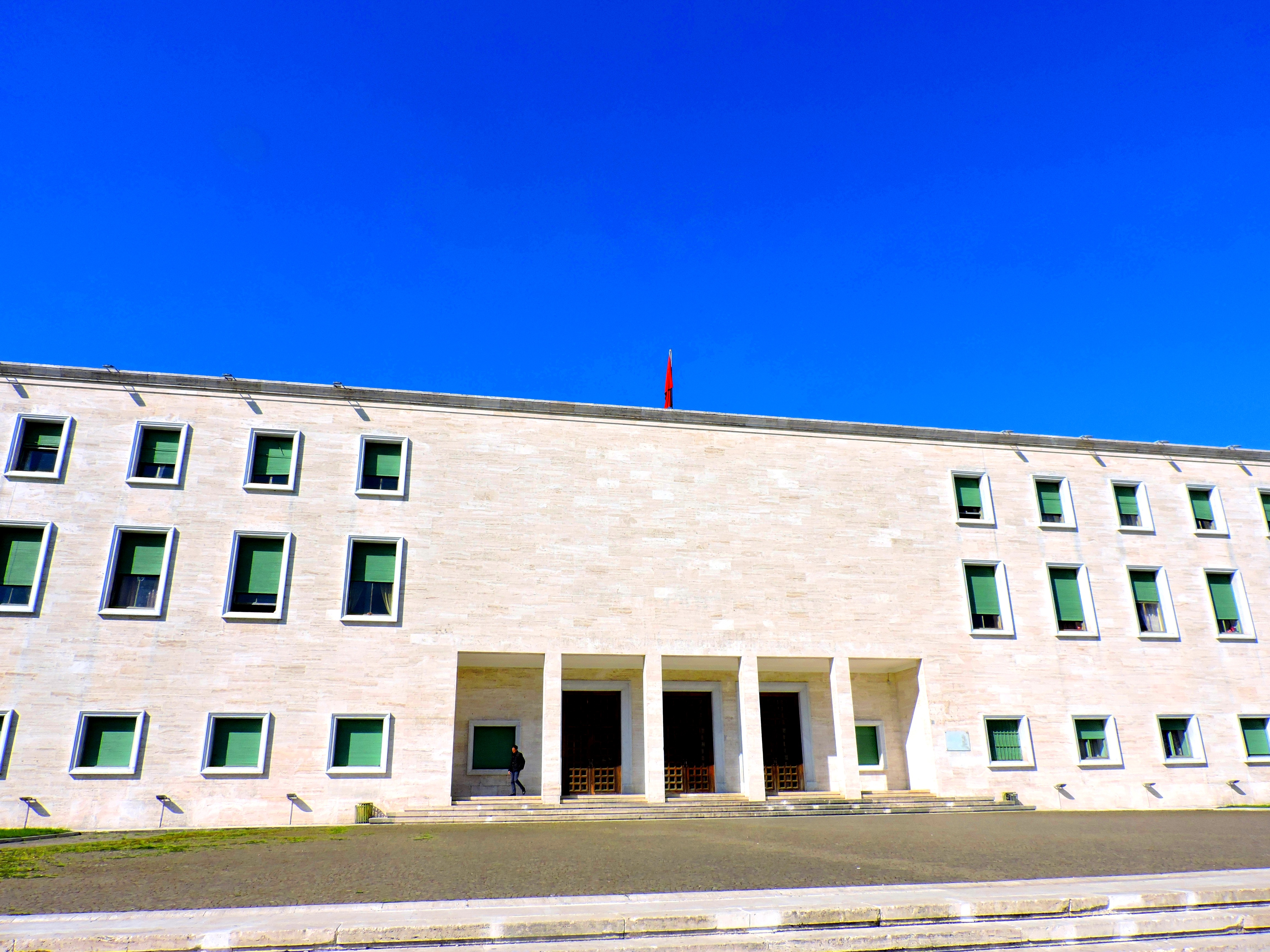
- Former names: Academy of Arts; Higher Institute of Arts
- Type: Public
- Established: 1966; 60 years ago
- Affiliations: ELIA, AEC, Albanian National Opera and Ballet, Albanian National Theatre, Albanian Fine Arts Gallery
- Endowment: Financed by the Government of Albania
- Rector: Prof. Dr. Erald Bakalli
- Faculty: 386, of which 119 full-time tenure track
- Administrative staff: 64
- Students: About 1,200
- Location: Tirana, Albania
- Campus: urban, based at the center of Tirana
- Colors
- Website: uart.edu.al

The University of Arts (Albanian: Universiteti I Arteve), formerly known as the Academy of Arts (Albanian: Akademia e Arteve), is a public university and the main institution that offers higher education of arts in Albania.

== History ==
Founded in 1966 as the Higher Institute of Arts (Albanian: Instituti i Lartë I Arteve), it merged three artistic institutions: the Tirana State Conservatory, the Higher School of Fine Arts, and the High School for Actors “Aleksander Moisiu”. The institute was able to take advantage of the Russian tradition in classical music and ballet due to the fact that Albania and Russia had close relationships during communism. The school still maintains ties with the Russian School of Ballet and Classical Music. In 1991, the Higher Institute of Arts was promoted to university level and renamed Academy of Arts. On October 12, 2009, the President of Albania, Bamir Topi awarded the Academy of Arts the "Grand Master Order".

== Academics ==
The Academy of Arts has three faculties:

- Faculty of Music. It offers majors in musicology, conducting, composition, piano, violin, viola, cello, double bass, guitar, flute, oboe, clarinet, trombone, trumpet, accordion, bassoon, horn, tuba, canto, and pedagogy, and has two academic departments
  - Musicology/Composition/Conducting Department
  - Performing Department
- Faculty of Visual Arts. It offers majors in painting, graphics, textile and fashion design, multimedia, applied design, sculpture, and ceramics, and has two academic departments:
  - Painting Department
  - Sculpture Department
- Faculty of Performing Arts. It offers majors in movie and TV directing, acting, stage design and costumography, and choreography, and has tree academic departments:
  - Acting Department
  - Directing/ **Stage/Design/Choreography/Art Theory Department

The artists trained in the institution have become well known in dance, music, theatre, film, and television in Albania and abroad. The teaching staff and associates of the Art Academy are musicologists, instrument players, painters, sculptors, theatre, film, and television directors, actors, stage designers, and choreographers.

== Directors/Rectors ==
From its creation until 1991 the Higher Institute of Arts was led by a Director. From 1997 to the present, it is directed by a Rector.

The Directors/Rectors of the University of Arts
1966–1969	Vilson Kilica (1932– ), painter, (Director of the Higher Institute of Arts)
1969–1973	Tefik Çaushi, writer, (Director of the Higher Institute of Arts)
1973–1978	Lili Zhamo, (Director of the Higher Institute of Arts)
1978–1981	Ibrahim Madhi, Professor of violin, (Director of the Higher Institute of Arts)
1981–1988	Kristo Jorgji, film director, (Director of the Higher Institute of Arts)
1988–1991	Jakup Mato (1934–2005), (Director of the Higher Institute of Arts)
1991–1992	Fatmir Hysi, musicologist, (Director of the Academy of Arts)
1992–1995	Bujar Kapexhiu (1944– ), film director and actor (Director of the Academy of Arts)
1995–1997	Gjergj Zheji (1926–2010), writer, (Director of the Academy of Arts)
1997–2008	Kastriot Çaushi (1954– ), actor, Professor of Drama (Rector of the Academy of Arts)
2008–2016	Petrit Malaj (1961– ), actor, Professor of Drama (Rector of the Academy of Arts, Rector of the University of Arts)
2016–2024	Kastriot Çaushi (1954– ), actor, Professor of Drama (Rector of the University of Arts)

2024- Erald Bakalli professor of scenography, Rector of the University of Arts

== Notable alumni ==
- Mirjam Tola (soprano)
- Inva Mula (opera)
- Ermonela Jaho (opera)
- Pirro Çako (conducting)
- Jonida Maliqi (canto)
- Edi Rama (visual arts)
- Anri Sala (visual arts)
- Helidon Gjergji (visual arts)
- Vénera Kastrati (visual arts)
- Altin Kaftira (ballet)
- Kledi Kadiu (ballet)
- Yllka Mujo (acting)
- Ndriçim Xhepa (acting)
- Luli Bitri (acting)
- Rajmonda Bulku (acting)
- Laert Vasili (acting)
- Arta Muçaj (acting)
- Aurela Gaçe (acting)
- Nik Xhelilaj (acting)
- Artan Imami (acting)
- Julian Deda (acting)
- Bleona (acting)
- Gulielm Radoja (acting)
- Qëndrim Rijani (directing)
- Gent Bejko (directing)
- Reida Dobi (ballet)

== Postage stamp ==
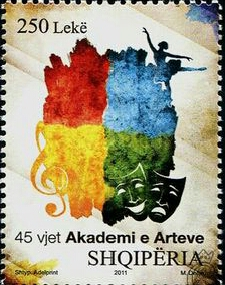
45th anniversary of the Academy of Arts

On December 15, 2011, to celebrate the 45th anniversary of the Academy of Arts, the Albanian Post issued a new postal stamp dedicated to this event. The stamp was introduced during a ceremony at the Main Hall of the University of Arts by the Head of the Philately Department of the Albanian Posts and the Rector Prof. Petrit Malaj.

== See also ==
- List of universities in Albania
- Quality Assurance Agency of Higher Education
- List of colleges and universities
- List of colleges and universities by country
- National Theatre of Opera and Ballet of Albania
- Palace of Culture of Tirana
- National Gallery of Figurative Arts of Albania
- National Theater of Albania
