= Tefta Tashko-Koço =

Albanian singer and soprano

Tefta Tashko-Koço AiP
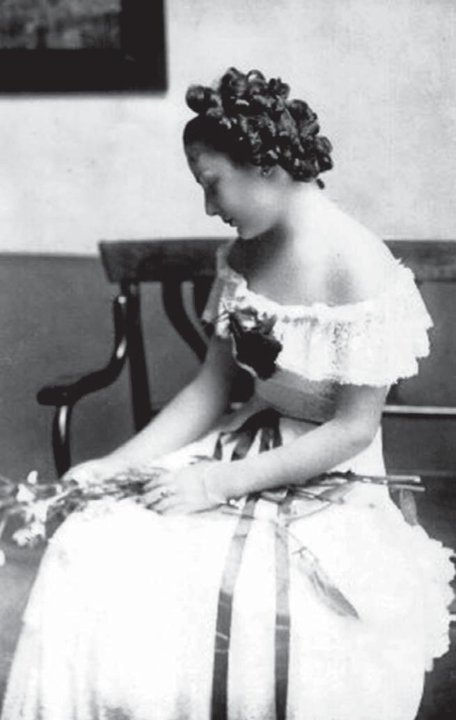
- Tefta Tashko-Koço in the 1930s
- Born: 2 November 1910; Faiyum, Sultanate of Egypt
- Died: 22 December 1947 (aged 37); Tirana, PR Albania
- Occupations: Singer; soprano
- Years active: 1936–1947
- Spouse: Kristaq Koço
- Children: 1
- Awards: People's Artist
- Musical career
- Instruments: Vocals

Tefta Tashko-Koço (pronounced [ˈtɛfta ˈtaʃkɔ ˈkɔt͡ʃɔ]; 2 November 1910 – 22 December 1947) was an Albanian singer and soprano. She was a leading figure in the regional music industry and is considered one of the most influential personalities of the 20th century in the Albanian-speaking world.

She was posthumously awarded the prestigious title People's Artist.

== Biography ==
=== Life ===
Tefta Tashko-Koço was born on 2 November 1910 into an Albanian family in Faiyum, Egypt. In 1921, the family moved to Korçë, Albania, and in 1927, Tefta left for France to study singing at the Conservatoire de Montpellier. From 1932 to 1936, she studied singing in the Conservatoire de Paris under André Gresse, Declamation lyrique with Salignac and Maintien and Art Mimique with G. Wague. In 1936, she permanently returned to Albania, where she performed operatic and chamber music as well as Albanian urban songs. She was asked to encore several times each concert when she performed in Albania.

She recorded Albanian urban lyric songs for the Columbia Society in Italy in 1937 and 1942, and was a regular performer on Radio Tirana since its foundation in 1938.

Tefta Tashko was accompanied by Lola Gjoka, and sang songs written specifically for her by the Albanian music composer Kristo Kono.

She later married Kristaq Koço and had a son together, Eno Koço (sq), currently a musical director and scholar. Tefta Tashko died unexpectedly in 1947, aged just 36.

== Portrait ==
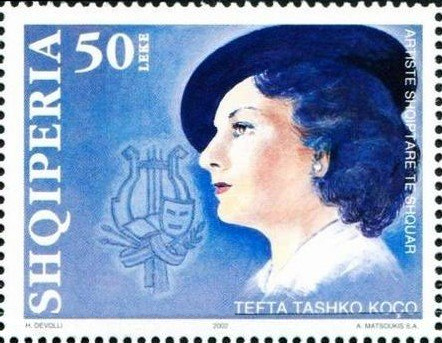
Tashko-Koço on a 2002 stamp of Albania

A painting by Myrteza Fushekrati (1942), made in 1976 [100x120 cm], was devoted to this artist and until 1990 it was displayed at the Gallery of Art in Tirana.

== Sources ==
- Eno Koço (2004). Albanian Urban Lyric Song in the 1930s. Scarecrow Press. ISBN 978-0-8108-4890-0.
