= Vasillaq Vangjeli =

Albanian actor

- Born: February 19, 1948; Kolonjë, Albania
- Died: September 26, 2011 (age 63), Tirana, Albania
- Occupations: Actor, Comedian
- Years active: 1976 - 2011
- Television: Piruet

Vasillaq Vangjeli (February 19, 1948 – September 26, 2011) was an Albanian actor and comedian, known for his role as Koçi in The Lady from the Town.
