= Aleko Prodani =

Albanian actor (1942–2006)

- Prodani in 1987
- Born: 19 May 1942; Korçë, Albania
- Died: 2 May 2006 (aged 63); Korçë, Albania
- Occupation: Actor
- Years active: 1961–2006
- Awards: Merited Artist

Aleko Prodani (19 May 1942 – 2 May 2006) was an Albanian actor and Merited Artist of Albania.

== Life and career ==
Born in Korçë, southern Albania on 19 May 1942, Prodani became one of the most acclaimed actors of the Andon Zako Çajupi Theatre. He died in 2006, on that same theatre's stage, while premiering Tre donne per un solo uomo of Dario Fo.

Prodani died on stage from a heart attack, performing a theatrical part, at the age of 63.
