= Merited Artist (Albania) =

Civil decoration of Albania from 1960 to 1996

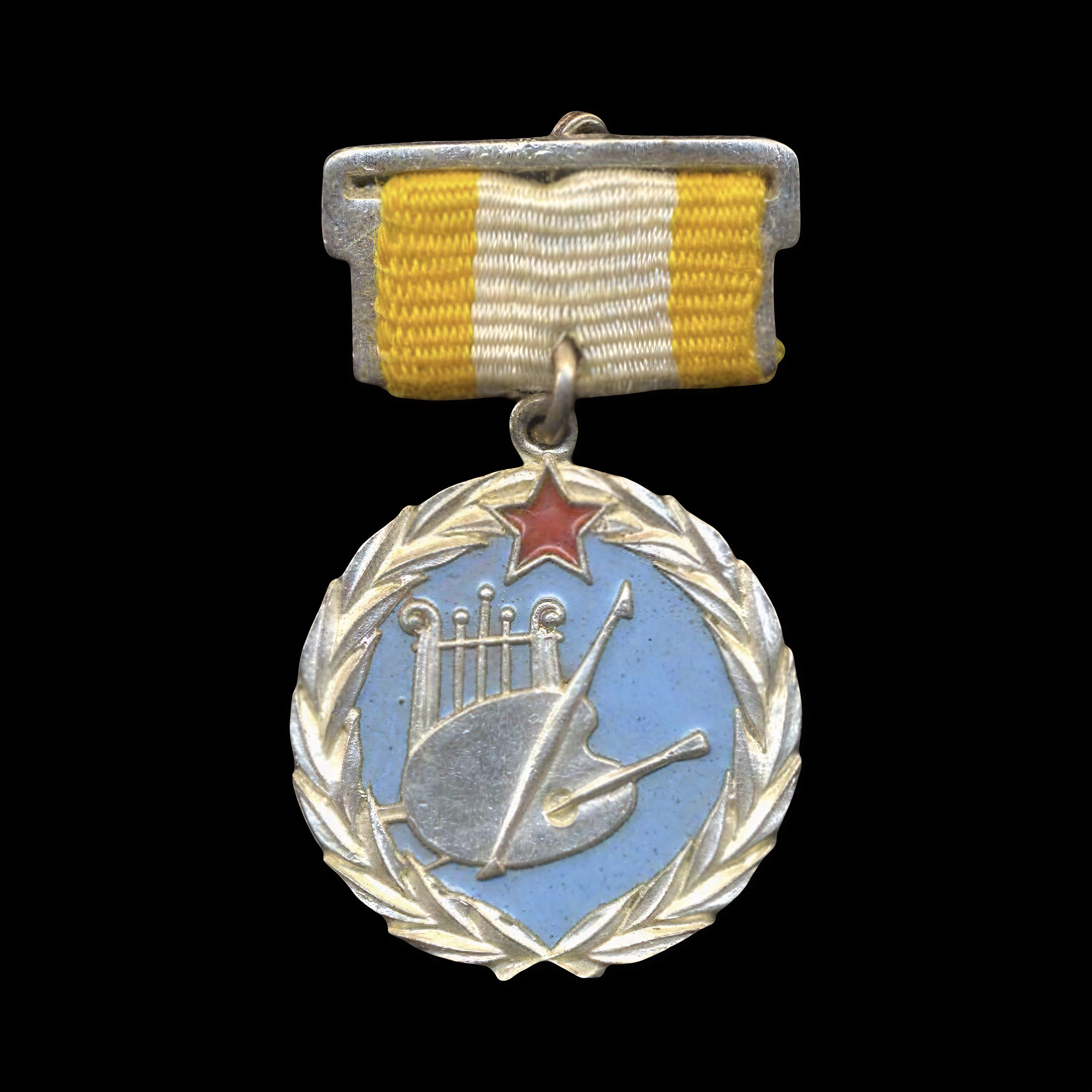
- Native name: Artist i Merituar
- Type: State decoration
- Country: People's Socialist Republic of Albania
- Presented by: The Presidium of the People's Assembly
- Ribbon: White with gold borders
- Status: Discontinued
- Established: 26 October 1960
- Ribbon bar

Merited Artist of Albania (Albanian: Artist i Merituar) was a state honorary title for the decoration of outstanding art performers of People's Socialist Republic of Albania. It was created by law in 1960 and amended in 1980. The title was no longer given in Albania after the law was amended in 1996.

== Definition ==
The title is the state award of Albania that was given for the personal merit in Albania to the citizens that worked in their respective artistic field as a rule of no less than ten years obtaining high on-the-job achievements and professional mastery.

== Conditions ==
The title was awarded by the President of Albania. It was given to citizens of Albania, foreigners, and persons with no citizenship. This title was lower than the People's Artist of Albania which could only be awarded ten years after obtaining the Merited Artist of Albania. This title was not awarded posthumously.

== Title recipients ==
The Merited Artist of Albania title could be awarded to motion picture directors; actors of theatres, films, and circus; singers; members of professional ensembles and choruses; orchestral conductors; composers; musicians; and TV and Radio network broadcasters for highly executed mastery and creating highly artistic images, performances, or motion pictures that became a property of the native culturally artistic heritage.

The recipients were also awarded a badge and a certificate. The presentation was conducted publicly. To be noted that all the People's Artist of Albania were recipients of the Merited Artist of Albania recognition first. Past recipients of the Merited Artist of Albania recognition include the following (by field of merit):

== Recipients ==
- Agim Krajka – composer and accordionist
- Albert Janku – ballet dancer (1975)
- Albert Minga – film and television director
- Aleksandër Peçi – composer
- Alqi Lepuri – conductor
- Andon Qesari – actor and theatre director
- Behije Lëvonja – actress (1975)
- Besim Zekthi – dancer and choreographer
- Dhimitra Mele – actress (1975)
- Dhimitër Anagnosti – film director
- Dhimitër Orgocka – actor and theatre director
- Drita Pelingu – actress and theatre director
- Eli Fara – singer
- Enver Birko – musician (1975)
- Enver Dauti – actor (1975)
- Eno Koço – conductor and musicologist
- Fehmi Shaqiri – dancer and choreographer
- Fitnete Rexha – folk singer
- Ganimet Vendresha – ballet dancer and choreographer (1975)
- Gaqo Jorganxhi – singer
- Gëzim Kaceli – dancer and choreographer
- Gjon Simoni – composer
- Gjoni Athanas – opera singer (1975)
- Gjyzepina Kosturi – opera singer
- Guljelm Radoja – actor
- Hajg Zaharian – composer
- Haxhi Dalipi – conductor and composer
- Hysen Pelingu – opera singer
- Koço Devole – actor, comedian and director
- Kujtim Çashku – film director
- Kujtim Laro – composer
- Lefka Mullisi – actress (1975)
- Liljana Kondakçi – singer
- Limoz Dizdari – composer
- Liza Laska – actress
- Lola Gjoka – pianist (1966)
- Luçie Miloti – folk singer (1961)
- Luiza Papa – actress
- Luk Kaçaj – opera singer (1961)
- Marie Logoreci – actress and singer (1961)
- Melpomeni Çobani – actress and comedian (1961)
- Mihal Ciko – opera singer
- Milto Vako – conductor
- Nadire Lubonja – actress (1975)
- Naile Hoxha – folk singer (1975)
- Ndriçim Xhepa – actor
- Nina Mula – opera singer (1975)
- Petrit Vorpsi – ballet dancer and choreographer (1975)
- Pina Shkurti – actress (1975)
- Piro Sulioti – singer
- Pranvera Uruni – actress (1975)
- Prokop Mima – actor (1975)
- Qemal Kërtusha – singer (1968)
- Rexhep Çeliku – dancer and choreographer
- Roland Trebicka – actor
- Sadi Halili – dancer, choreographer and folklorist
- Shyqyri Alushi – folk singer (1984)
- Shyqyri Sako – film production designer and painter
- Simon Gjoni – composer and conductor
- Spiro Strati – actor (1975)
- Thoma Gaqi – composer
- Todi Llupi – actor and comedian (1989)
- Tonin Harapi – composer and pianist
- Vangjush Furxhi – actor
- Xhemal Laçi – choral conductor
- Xhevdet Hafizi – folk singer (1975)
- Yllka Mujo – actress
- Ymer Neli – folk musician and composer (1979)
- Zef Jubani – actor and theatre director
- Zija Grapshi – actor

== See also ==
- Orders, decorations and medals of Albania
- People's Artist of Albania
