= Albania's Got Talent season 2 =

Albania's Got Talent
- Season 2
- Presented by: Isli Islami
- Judges: Adelina Ismaili; Agron Llakaj; Kastro Zizo; Ledina Çelo (episode 1-2); Elsa Lila (episode 3-12)
- Winner: Nikolas Bushi
- Runner-up: Diego Zelka

Release
- Original network: Vizion Plus
- Original release: 20 October 2025 – 12 January 2026

Season chronology
- ← Previous; Season 1

The second season of the Albanian talent competition programme Albania's Got Talent began airing on 20 October 2025 on Vizion Plus. The judging panel of Adelina Ismaili, Agron Llakaj, and Kastro Zizo returned from the previous season. Ledina Çelo also returned, but was removed from the season shortly after the first two episodes and replaced by Elsa Lila. Isli Islami returned as the host.

== Production ==
Following the success of its first season, Vizion Plus announced a second season, with applications opening after the finale of Albania's Got Talent season 1. All four judges, Adelina Ismaili, Agron Llakaj, Kastro Zizo, and Ledina Çelo, returned from the previous season, along with host Isli Islami. On 30 October 2025, Ledina Çelo announced that she would not continue in the show after the first two episodes had aired. On 2 November 2025, Vizion Plus announced that Elsa Lila would join the judging panel as the newest member, alongside Ismaili, Llakaj, and Zizo.

== Season overview ==
Winner | Runner-up | Third Place | Finalist | Semi-finalist | Golden Buzzer Audition | Withdrew

Participant	Age(s)	Genre	Act	Semi-final	Finished
Alba Folk	—	Dance	Albanian Folk Dance Group	2	Finalist
Ambra Marku	12	Singing	Singer	4	Eliminated
Andi Hyso	17	Singing	Singer	4	Finalist
Artin Cami	17	Music	Piano	2	Eliminated
Astrit Hafizllari	64	Singing	Singer	2	Eliminated
Ben Shaqiri	11	Music	Electric Guitarist	4	Eliminated
Betim Asani	23	Music	Beatboxer	4	Eliminated
Break The Floor	—N/a	Dance	Albanian Folk Dance Group	4	Eliminated
Briselda Yzeiri	12	Singing	Singer	4	Finalist
Clorinda Varricchio	44	Dance	Hula-Hoop Dancer	1	Eliminated
Dashnor Bushi	47	Magic	Illusionist	— ^{1}	Finalist
Dea Laja	11	Singing	Singer	3	Eliminated
Derin Pehlivan	13	Singing	Singer	3	Eliminated
Dhurata Berisha	15	Singing	Singer	2	Eliminated
Diego Zelka	23	Singing	Singer	— ^{1}	Runner-Up
Ebi & Paola	19 & 20	Performing	Circus Art Duo	1	Eliminated
Edmond Murraj	60	Magic	Illusionist	4	Eliminated
Ejza Hozha	16	Performing	Singer, Dancer, Actress	4	Eliminated
Elijah Starr	46	Singing	Singer	2	Eliminated
Eliza Thartori	18	Singing	Singer	1	Eliminated
Elti Popova	16	Singing	Singer	1	Eliminated
Erdenaj Sali	16	Music	Clarinetist	1	Finalist
Esper Kalemaj	8	Acrobatics, Dance	Acro Dancer	4	Eliminated
Franceska & Alesia Kasa	16 & 17	Singing	Singing Duo	1	Eliminated
Future Steps	—	Dance	Hip Hop Dance Group	1	Withdrew ^{2}
Geart Nazifi	13	Music	Drummer	2	Eliminated
Geron Papa	11	Music	Drummer	4	Eliminated
Grupi i Grave Teuta	—	Singing	Choir	3	Finalist
Ilisea Ndreu	15	Singing	Singer	3	Eliminated
International Dance Academy Albania	—N/a	Dance	Albanian Folk Dance Group, Classical Dancer	1	Eliminated
Klesti Koxha	16	Magic	Illusionist	3	Eliminated
Luna & Ajla	10	Performing	Circus Art Duo	3	Eliminated
Luna Nerguti	11	Singing	Singer	3	Eliminated
Marina Lleshi	15	Singing	Singer	2	Eliminated
Michael Cavallaro	15	Music	Drummer	1	Eliminated
Nikolas Bushi	21	Performing	Ventriloquist	— ^{1}	Winner
Roan Bejleri	13	Music	Drummer	3	Finalist
Roan Spaho	14	Singing	Singer	2	Eliminated
Sajmir Hamolli	25	Performing	Circus Artist	— ^{1}	Finalist
SH.K.A Xheladin Zeqiri	—N/a	Dance	Albanian Folk Dance Group	3	Eliminated
Toxic Records	—	Performing	Beatbox & Singing Group	2	Third Place
Trinda Haxhiu	17	Singing	Singer	1	Eliminated
Uendi	15	Acrobatics	Acrobat	2	Eliminated
Zymryt Unlusoy	14	Acrobatics	Acrobat	3	Eliminated

- ^1 The participants received a Golden Buzzer in the auditions and advanced directly to the finals.
- ^2 This participant initially pulled out from the contest for personal reasons before the final

=== Semi-finals summary ===
Buzzed Out | Advanced to Finals | Eliminated (Top 4)

==== Semi-final 1 (8 December) ====
Participant	Order	Buzzes				Result
Participant	Order	Llakaj	Ismaili	Lila	Zizo	Result
Future Steps	1					Advanced
Clorinda Varricchio	2					Eliminated
Franceska & Alesia Kasa	3					Eliminated
Michael Cavallaro	4					Eliminated (Top 4)
Trinda Haxhiu	5					Eliminated
Ebi & Paola	6					Eliminated (Top 4)
Erdenaj Sali	7					Advanced
Elti Popova	8					Eliminated
International Dance Academy Albania	9					Eliminated
Eliza Thartori	10					Eliminated

==== Semi-final 2 (15 December) ====
Participant	Order	Buzzes				Result
Participant	Order	Llakaj	Ismaili	Lila	Zizo	Result
Marina Lleshi	1					Eliminated
Artin Cami	2					Eliminated (Top 4)
Toxic Records	3					Advanced
Elijah Starr	4					Eliminated
Astrit Hafizllari	5					Eliminated
Dhurata Berisha	6					Eliminated (Top 4)
Uendi	7					Eliminated
Roan Spaho	8					Eliminated
Geart Nazifi	9					Eliminated
Alba Folk	10					Advanced

==== Semi-final 3 (22 December) ====
Participant	Order	Buzzes				Result
Participant	Order	Llakaj	Ismaili	Lila	Zizo	Result
Luna & Ajla	1					Eliminated
Grupi i Grave Teuta	2					Advanced
Derin Pehlivan	3					Eliminated
Klesti Koxha	4					Eliminated (Top 4)
Luna Nerguti	5					Eliminated
Roan Bejleri	6					Advanced
Ilisea Ndreu	7					Eliminated
SH.K.A Xheladin Zeqiri	8					Eliminated
Dea Laja	9					Eliminated (Top 4)
Zymryt Unlusoy	10					Eliminated

==== Semi-final 4 (29 December) ====
Participant	Order	Buzzes				Result
Participant	Order	Llakaj	Ismaili	Lila	Zizo	Result
Geron Papa	1					Eliminated
Briselda Yzeiri	2					Advanced
Betim Asani	3					Eliminated (Top 4)
Esper Kalemaj	4					Eliminated
Ejza Hozha	5					Eliminated
Edmond Murraj	6					Eliminated
Ambra Marku	7					Eliminated
Ben Shaqiri	8					Eliminated
Andi Hyso	9					Advanced
Break The Floor	10					Eliminated (Top 4)

=== Finals summary ===
Winner | Runner-up | 3rd place

Participant	Order	Finished
Grupi i Grave Teuta	1	5th place
Roan Bejleri	2	4th place
Toxic Records	3	3rd place
Sajmir Hamolli	4	7th place
Andi Hyso	5	10th place
Dashnor Bushi	6	8th place
Erdenaj Sali	7	6th place
Briselda Yzeiri	8	11th place
Diego Zelka	9	2nd place
Nikolas Bushi	10	1st place
Alba Folk	11	9th place
