= Albania's Got Talent =

Albanian television series

- Created by: Simon Cowell
- Presented by: Isli Islami
- Judges: Adelina Ismaili; Agron Llakaj; Kastro Zizo; Ledina Çelo; Elsa Lila
- Country of origin: Albania; Kosovo
- No. of series: 2
- No. of episodes: 24

Production
- Producer: Vizion Plus
- Running time: 150 mins

Original release
- Network: Vizion Plus
- Release: 11 November 2024 – present

Albania's Got Talent is an Albanian talent show competition adaptation of the Got Talent franchise created by Simon Cowell, it is the second Albanian iteration after Albanians Got Talent. The show premiered on 11 November 2024 on Vizion Plus. The host is Isli Islami. The current judges are Adelina Ismaili, Agron Llakaj and Kastro Zizo. Ledina Çelo served as a judge during the first season and the first two episodes of the second season, before being replaced by Elsa Lila from the third episode onwards. The winner of the first season was Tristan Cela. It was primarily catered towards Albanians from Albania, Kosovo, and North Macedonia.

Due to satisfactory ratings of the first season, Vizion Plus announced a second season of Albania's Got Talent, which began airing on 20 October 2025.

== Judges and presenters ==
	Seasons	
	1	2
	2024–25	2025–26
Hosts
Isli Islami	Main	
Judging Panelists
Adelina Ismaili	Main	
Agron Llakaj	Main	
Kastro Zizo	Main	
Ledina Çelo	Main	
Elsa Lila		Main

== Series overview ==
Season	Start	Finish	Episodes	Winner	Runner-up	Third place	Network
1	11 November 2024	27 January 2025	12	Tristan Cela	Ermes Balili	Arjeta Dhima	Vizion Plus
2	20 October 2025	12 January 2026	12	Nikolas Bushi	Diego Zelka	Toxic Records	Vizion Plus

=== Season 1 (2024–2025) ===
The first season of Albania's Got Talent was announced to air on Vizion Plus. The show began airing on 11 November 2024. The host was Isli Islami. The judges were singer Adelina Ismaili, comedian and actor Agron Llakaj, singer and songwriter Kastro Zizo and singer and model Ledina Çelo. The show ended on 27 January 2025, with Tristan Cela as the winner of the first season.

=== Season 2 (2025–2026) ===
On the final of the first season of Albania's Got Talent, was announced the second season. Οn the same day, applications for the show were open. The show began airing on 20 October 2025. Isli Islami returned as host. Adelina Ismaili, Agron Llakaj and Kastro Zizo returned as judges. Ledina Çelo returned for the first two episodes as a judge, but since the third episode was replaced by singer Elsa Lila.
