= Festivali i Këngës 61 =

61st edition of Festivali i Këngës

Dates and venue
- Semi-final 1: 19 December 2022
- Semi-final 2: 20 December 2022
- Semi-final 3: 21 December 2022 (Nostalgia Night)
- Final: 22 December 2022
- Venue: Palace of Congresses, Tirana

Organisation
- Host broadcaster: Radio Televizioni Shqiptar (RTSH)
- Presenters: Arbana Osmani

Participants
- Number of entries: 26

Vote
- Voting system: Jury selected the top three contestants, which included awards for alternative and young groups and established artists. Public selected the Albanian representative for the Eurovision Song Contest 2023.

Festival selection
- Winner: "Evita" by Elsa Lila

Eurovision selection
- Winner: "Duje" by Albina and Familja Kelmendi

Festivali i Këngës 61 was the 61st edition of the annual Albanian music competition Festivali i Këngës. The contest was organised by Radio Televizioni Shqiptar (RTSH) at the Palace of Congresses in Tirana, Albania. It encompassed two semi-finals held on 19 and 20 December, succeeded by a nostalgia night on 21 December and culminated in the final on 22 December 2022. The four live shows were hosted by Arbana Osmani. Elsa Lila resulted as the winner of the contest with the song "Evita". The Albanian representative for the Eurovision Song Contest 2023 was selected by the public, with "Duje" performed by Albina and Familja Kelmendi emerging as the representative.

== Format ==
The 61st edition of Festivali i Këngës was organised by Radio Televizioni Shqiptar (RTSH) and consisted of three semi-finals on the respective dates of 19, 20 and 21 December and the final on 22 December 2022. The four live shows were hosted by Albanian presenter Arbana Osmani and held at the Palace of Congresses in Tirana, Albania. Osmani directed the contest along with Bojken Lako, Eduart Grishaj, Eraldo Rexho and Shpëtim Saraçi.

=== Voting structure ===
The selection process for the winner of the 61st edition of Festivali i Këngës and Albanian representative for the Eurovision Song Contest 2023 underwent a significant change. Prior to this, the winner was determined by a jury vote, which faced controversy due to allegations of nepotism and corruption. In response, the organisers of RTSH introduced a new system combining public and jury voting. While the top three and two prizes would continue to be chosen by the jury, the winner would no longer receive an invitation to participate in the Eurovision Song Contest. Instead, the Albanian representative for the contest would be selected through a separate televoting process.

== Contestants ==
RTSH initiated an application period for artists and composers interested in participating in the 61st edition of Festivali i Këngës from 3 June to 30 October 2022. Following the application process, a provisional list of 26 participants was published by the broadcaster on 27 October, three days prior to the end of the application period.

Competing entries
Artist(s)	Song	Composer(s)	Lyricist
2 Farm	"Atomike"	Klevis Bega (Kastro Zizo), Renan Berati, Redvis Mazi	
Alban Kondi and Lorè	"Melodi"	Alban Kondi	
Albina & Familja Kelmendi	"Duje"	Enis Mullaj	Eriona Rushiti
Anduel Kovaçi	"Malli"	Irkenc Hyka	
Arsi Bako	"Sonte dua të jem me ty"	Osman Mula	Evis Mula
Elsa Lila	"Evita"	Elsa Lila	
Enxhi Nasufi	"Burrë"	Enxhi Nasufi, Andrei "Alandy" Vornicu	
Erma Mici	"Kozmosi i dashurisë"	Erma Mici, Andi Lazaj	Erma Mici
Evi Reçi	"Ma kthe"	Ervin Gonxhi	Vojsava Alla
Fabian Basha	"Një gotë"	Alban Kondi, Fabian Basha	Alban Kondi
Fifi	"Stop"	Filloreta "Fifi" Raçi, Fatjo Miftaraj	Filloreta "Fifi" Raçi
Franc Koruni	"Në pritje"	Franc Koruni	
Gent Hoxha	"Ajër"	Jeris Kaso	Elio Shuli
Gjergj Kaçinari	"Dje"	Gjergj Kaçinari	
Luna Çausholli	"Jetën ta fal"	Endri Shani	Pandi Laço
Lynx	"Nëse ke besim"	Lynx	
Manjola Nallbani	"Duaj"	Kledi Bahiti	Manjola Nallbani
Melodajn Mancaku	"Gjysma e zemrës sime"	Wendi Mancaku	Melodajn Mancaku
Permit of Stay	"Fobia"	Ergys Meta	
Petrit Çarkaxhiu	"Emri yt mirësi"	Petrit Çarkaxhiu	
Rezarta Smaja	"N'Eden"	Eriona Rushiti	
Rovena Dilo	"Motit"	Aldo Shqalshi	Rovena Dilo
Sara Kapo	"Para teje"	Sara Kapo	
Sergio Hajdini	"Vështirë"	Serxhio Hajdini	
Urban Band	"Në çdo hap"	Klodian Rexhepaj	Florian "Kelly" Çarkanji
Vanesa Sono	"Aroma jonë"	Vanesa Sono	Alban Kondi

== Shows ==
=== Semi-finals ===
The semi-finals of Festivali i Këngës took place on 19 December and 20 December 2022 and were broadcast live at 21:00 (CET) on the respective dates. Albanian actress Margarita Xhepa was the special guest of the first semi-final, performing a monologue to raise awareness about domestic violence against women and share her own experiences. Following the conclusion of the second semi-final, five out of ten contestants from the New artists were selected by a jury to advance to the final, while all 16 contestants from the Big artists automatically qualified for the final.

Key: Automatic Qualifier Qualifier

Semi-final 1 – 19 December 2022
R/O	Artist	Song	Result
1	Enxhi Nasufi	"Burrë"	Aut. Qualified
2	Erma Mici	"Kozmosi i dashurisë"	Qualified
3	Fabian Basha	"Një gotë"	Aut. Qualified
4	Anduel Kovaçi	"Malli"	—N/a
5	Fifi	"Stop"	Aut. Qualified
6	Urban Band	"Në çdo hap"	Qualified
7	2 Farm	"Atomike"	Aut. Qualified
8	Sara Kapo	"Para teje"	—N/a
9	Rezarta Smaja	"N'Eden"	Aut. Qualified
10	Albina and Familja Kelmendi	"Duje"	Aut. Qualified
11	Sergio Hajdini	"Vështirë"	Aut. Qualified
12	Luna Çausholli	"Jetën ta fal"	—N/a
13	Rovena Dilo	"Motit"	Aut. Qualified

Semi-final 2 – 20 December 2022
R/O	Artist	Song	Result
1	Melodajn Mancaku	"Gjysma e zemrës sime"	Qualified
2	Permit of Stay	"Fobia"	—N/a
3	Arsi Bako	"Sonte dua të jem me ty"	—N/a
4	Gjergj Kaçinari	"Dje"	Aut. Qualified
5	Franc Koruni	"Në pritje"	Aut. Qualified
6	Petrit Çarkaxhiu	"Emri yt mirësi"	Aut. Qualified
7	Elsa Lila	"Evita"	Aut. Qualified
8	Gent Hoxha	"Ajër"	Qualified
9	Evi Reçi	"Ma kthe"	Aut. Qualified
10	Manjola Nallbani	"Duaj"	Aut. Qualified
11	Lynx	"Nëse ke besim"	Aut. Qualified
12	Alban Kondi and Lore	"Melodi"	Aut. Qualified
13	Vanesa Sono	"Aroma jonë"	Qualified

=== Nostalgia Night ===
The nostalgia night of Festivali i Këngës took place on 21 December 2022 at 21:00 (CET). During the show, prominent Albanian singers accompanied the Big artists in performing renditions of historic songs from previous editions of Festivali i Këngës.

Nostalgia Night – 21 December 2022
R/O	Artist(s)	Song	Year	Artist(s)
1	Lynx and Aleksandër Gjoka	"Ecën në shi"	1993	Aleksandër Gjoka
2	Enxhi Nasufi and Edea Demaliaj	"Mos qaj"	1997	Djemtë e detit
3	Evi Reçi and Rosela Gjylbegu	"Të kërkoj në ëndërrime"	1988	Eranda and Irma Libohova
4	Petrit Çarkaxhiu and Bojken Lako	"Asgjë e larget"	1999	Bojken Lako
5	Rezarta Smaja and Luan Zhegu	"A do vish"	1987	Luan Zhegu
6	Sergio Hajdini and Kamela Islamaj	"Ne jemi tre"	1965	Fiqrete Kapo and Qemal Kërtusha
7	Elsa Lila and Capital T	"Pyes lotin"	1996	Elsa Lila
8	Fabian Basha and Eranda Libohova	"Kthehu për vehte për mua"	1996	Eranda Libohova
9	Rovena Dilo and Soni Malaj	"Ante i tokës sime"	2000	Rovena Dilo
10	Franc Koruni and Altin Goci	"Endërroj"	1991	Ritfolk
11	Fifi and Flori Mumajesi	"Larg u largova"	1993	Haxhi Dauti
12	Albina Kelmendi and Josif Gjipali	"Na lini të jetojmë"	1991	Tingulli i zjarrtë
13	Manjola Nallbani and Eneda Tarifa	"Kur e humba një dashuri"	1993	Manjola Nallbani
14	2 Farm and Redon Makashi	"Dikur luaja me ndjenjën e saj"	1994	Redon Makashi
15	Alban Kondi, Lore and West Side Family	"Jehonë"	2008	West Side Family
16	Gjergj Kaçinari and Elhaida Dani	"Natën vonë"	1972	Vaçe Zela

=== Final ===
The final of Festivali i Këngës took place on 22 December 2022 at 21:00 (CET). Albanian-Belgian singer Gala Dragot and Ukrainian group Kalush, who won the Eurovision Song Contest 2022, were the interval acts of the final. The jury, consisting of Alma Bektashi, Elton Deda, Genc Salihu, Jeani Ciko and Rita Petro, determined Elsa Lila as the winner of the contest with the song "Evita". The Albanian representative for the Eurovision Song Contest 2023 was selected by televoting, with Albina and Familja Kelmendi with the song "Duje" being named as the country's chosen representatives. Erma Mici received the award for the Best New Artist, while Rovena Dilo was awarded the Career Award.

Key: Winner Second place Third place

Final – 22 December 2022
R/O	Artist	Song	Place
1	2 Farm	"Atomike"	3
2	Sergio Hajdini	"Vështirë"	—N/a
3	Gjergj Kaçinari	"Dje"	—N/a
4	Alban Kondi and Lore	"Melodi"	—N/a
5	Vanesa Sono	"Aroma jonë"	—N/a
6	Elsa Lila	"Evita"	1
7	Erma Mici	"Kozmosi i dashurisë"	—N/a
8	Franc Koruni	"Në pritje"	—N/a
9	Gent Hoxha	"Ajër"	—N/a
10	Petrit Çarkaxhiu	"Emri yt mirësi"	—N/a
11	Melodajna Mancaku	"Gjysma e zemrës sime"	—N/a
12	Manjola Nallbani	"Duaj"	—N/a
13	Urban Band	"Në çdo hap"	—N/a
14	Enxhi Nasufi	"Burrë"	—N/a
15	Rovena Dilo	"Motit"	—N/a
16	Fifi	"Stop"	—N/a
17	Rezarta Smaja	"N'Eden"	—N/a
18	Evi Reçi	"Ma kthe"	—N/a
19	Fabian Basha	"Një gotë"	—N/a
20	Albina and Familja Kelmendi	"Duje"	2
21	Lynx	"Nëse ke besim"	—N/a

== Broadcasts ==
The four live shows of Festivali i Këngës were broadcast live from 19 December to 22 December 2022 on RTSH in Albania and Radio Televizioni i Kosovës (RTK) in Kosovo. RTSH further provided international live streaming of the shows through their official website, without any accompanying commentary.

Broadcasters
Country	Show(s)	Broadcaster(s)	Ref
Albania	All shows	Radio Televizioni Shqiptar (RTSH)	
Kosovo	All shows	Radio Televizioni i Kosovës (RTK)	

== See also ==
- Festivali i Këngës
- Eurovision Song Contest 2023
- Albania in the Eurovision Song Contest 2023
