= Albania's Got Talent season 1 =

Albania's Got Talent
- Season 1
- Presented by: Isli Islami
- Judges: Adelina Ismaili; Agron Llakaj; Kastro Zizo; Ledina Çelo
- Winner: Tristan Cela
- Runner-up: Ermes Balili

Release
- Original network: Vizion Plus
- Original release: 11 November 2024 – 27 January 2025

The first season of the Albanian talent competition programme Albania's Got Talent began airing on 11 November 2024 and concluded on 27 January 2025 on Vizion Plus, almost fourteen years since it last aired on Top Channel, with the name Albanians Got Talent. The season was presented by Isli Islami, with Adelina Ismaili, Agron Llakaj, Kastro Zizo and Ledina Çelo were the judges.

The first season was won by 14-year-old singer Tristan Cela, with instrumentalist Ermes Balili finishing in second place, and ventriloquism Arjeta Dhima placing third place.

== Production ==
In early 2024, Vizion Plus announced that the show will begin airing in end of 2024. Auditions were held across Albania, during August-October 2024. On 6 November 2024, it was announced that Isli Islami will be the presenter of the show. On 7 November 2024, it was announced that singer Adelina Ismaili, comedian and actor Agron Llakaj, singer and songwriter Kastro Zizo and singer and model Ledina Çelo, were announced as the judges. The Show premiered on 11 November 2024 and aired every Monday at 9:00 pm on Vizion Plus. After 12 episodes, the final was on 27 January 2025.

== Season overview ==
Winner | Runner-up | Third Place | Finalist | Semi-finalist | Golden Buzzer Audition | Withdrew

Participant	Age(s)	Genre	Act	Semi-final	Finished
Amela Qemalja	17	Singing	Singer	1	Eliminated
Amla Demushi	12	Singing	Singer	4	Eliminated
Anisa Dervishi	18	Singing	Singer	1	Eliminated
Aria Daja	10	Acrobatics, Dance	Acrodance	4	Eliminated
Arjeta Dhima	—	Performing	Ventriloquism	— ^{1}	Third place
Aron	14	Dance	Ninja dance	3	Eliminated
Belkisa & Marvi	—	Dance	Dancer	2	Eliminated
Break the floor	—	Dance	Albanian Folk dance	3	Eliminated
Brigel Alickolli	16	Singing	Singer	2	Eliminated
Cory Cramer	40	Singing	Singer	3	Finalist
Darien Cylaku	11	Performing	Geography	2	Eliminated
Dejzi Zylaj	15	Singing	Singer	3	Finalist
Dhima Dance Academy	—	Dance	Dancer	1	Eliminated
Emili Dervishi	13	Singing	Singer	2	Eliminated
Ermes Balili	10	Music	Instrumentalist	2	Runner-Up
Ermis Arra	14	Performing	Mathematics	3	Eliminated
Fatmir Mura	48	Performing	Performance in the Sand	— ^{1}	Finalist
Fatmir Rustja	15	Music	Beatboxing	2	Eliminated
Flora Zenuni	45	Singing	Singer	1	Eliminated
Franko Ahmeti	14	Music	Clarinet	3	Eliminated
Ilir Ferizi	47	Magic	Illusionist	— ^{1}	Withdrew ^{2}
Jana & Jori Blakiqi	13	Music	Instrumentalist	4	Eliminated
Joti	33	Performing	Salt art	4	Eliminated
Katerina Dudka	13	Dance	Ballet Dancer	4	Eliminated
Keris Babliku	21	Singing	Singer	3	Eliminated
Kill the Beat	—	Dance	Hip Hop Dance	1	Eliminated
Klejvi Kapeta	15	Singing	Singer	2	Finalist
Kristi Lulaj	15	Dance	Ballet Dancer	1	Eliminated
Leandra Plaku	11	Dance	Hip Hop Dance	4	Finalist
Luigi Fiorentino	39	Acrobatics	Juggler	2	Eliminated
Maren Tare	8	Acrobatics	Acrobatic	3	Eliminated
Nadia Muca	12	Singing	Singer	3	Eliminated
Reana Bajrami	8	Singing	Singer	4	Eliminated
Romeo Deda	39	Performing	Genius of memory	4	Eliminated
Santiliano Berisha	20	Singing	Singer	2	Eliminated
Sara & Luana	—	Dance	Hip Hop Dance	3	Eliminated
Soar Zhugri	13	Dance	Ballet Dancer	4	Eliminated
Stefano Mauriello	45	Magic	Bubble Artist	1	Finalist
Terenc Gjoka	41	Singing	Singer	1	Eliminated
The Beat Killers	—	Dance	Hip Hop Dance	— ^{1}	Finalist
The Madness Leaders	—	Acrobatics	Acrobatic Group	1	Finalist
Tristan Cela	14	Singing	Singer	4	Winner
Valon Jashari	21	Acrobatics	Acrobatic	2	Eliminated
Xhufe Kaci	63	Singing	Singer	1	Eliminated

- ^1 The participants received a Golden Buzzer in the auditions and advanced directly to the finals.
- ^2 This participant initially pulled out from the contest for personal reasons before the final

=== Semi-finals summary ===
Buzzed Out | Advanced to Finals | Eliminated (Top 4)

==== Semi-final 1 (31 December) ====
Participant	Order	Buzzes				Result
Participant	Order	Llakaj	Ismaili	Çelo	Zizo	Result
Dhima Dance Academy	1					Eliminated (Top 4)
Terenc Gjoka	2					Eliminated
The Madness Leaders	3					Advanced
Anisa Dervishi	4					Eliminated
Xhufe Kaci	5					Eliminated
Kristi Lulaj	6					Eliminated
Flora Zenuni	7					Eliminated
Kill the Beat	8					Eliminated
Stefano Mauriello	9					Advanced
Amela Qemalja	10					Eliminated (Top 4)

==== Semi-final 2 (6 January) ====
Participant	Order	Buzzes				Result
Participant	Order	Llakaj	Ismaili	Çelo	Zizo	Result
Emili Dervishi	1					Eliminated (Top 4)
Brigel Alickolli	2					Eliminated
Belkisa & Marvi	3					Eliminated
Ermes Balili	4					Advanced
Fatmir Rustja	5					Eliminated
Santiliano Berisha	6					Eliminated
Luigi Fiorentino	7					Eliminated (Top 4)
Darien Cylaku	8					Eliminated
Valon Jashari	9					Eliminated
Klejvi Kapeta	10					Advanced

==== Semi-final 3 (13 January) ====
Participant	Order	Buzzes				Result
Participant	Order	Llakaj	Ismaili	Çelo	Zizo	Result
Break the floor	1					Eliminated (Top 4)
Nadia Muca	2					Eliminated
Ermis Arra	3					Eliminated
Sara & Luana	4					Eliminated
Cory Cramer	5					Advanced
Aron	6					Eliminated
Franko Ahmeti	7					Eliminated (Top 4)
Keris Babliku	8					Eliminated
Maren Tare	9					Eliminated
Dejzi Zylaj	10					Advanced

==== Semi-final 4 (20 January) ====
Participant	Order	Buzzes				Result
Participant	Order	Llakaj	Ismaili	Çelo	Zizo	Result
Leandra Plaku	1					Advanced
Joti	2					Eliminated
Reana Bajrami	3					Eliminated
Jana & Jori Blakiqi	4					Eliminated (Top 4)
Katerina Dudka	5					Eliminated
Amla Demushi	6					Eliminated (Top 4)
Soar Zhugri	7					Eliminated
Romeo Deda	8					Eliminated
Aria Daja	9					Eliminated
Tristan Cela	10					Advanced

=== Finals summary ===
Winner | Runner-up | 3rd place

Participant	Order	Finished
Fatmir Mura	1	11th place
The Madness Leaders	2	5th place
Klejvi Kapeta	3	4th place
Dejzi Zylaj	4	7th place
Arjeta Dhima	5	3rd place
Leandra Plaku	6	6th place
Ermes Balili	7	2nd place
Cory Cramer	8	9th place
Stefano Mauriello	9	10th place
Tristan Cela	10	1st place
The Beat Killers	11	8th place
