= Music of Abruzzo =

Style of music in Abruzzo, Italy

The Music of Abruzzo is a style of music in Abruzzo, Italy. Abruzzo is sparsely populated and is very mountainous, but the area has a musical history involving opera, sacred music, and even the town band. The great composer of delicate, 19th-century airs, Francesco Paolo Tosti, dedicated a series of compositions to the area, the romanze abruzzesi.

== Provinces ==
The region has four provinces, each named for the largest city in—and capital of—the province. They are L'Aquila, Chieti, Pescara, and Teramo. By province, they offer:

The presence of Flemish composers and private patrons of the arts in L'Aquila accounts for the fact that as long ago as the early 17th century there was an opera theater in Chieti—the Teatro S. Salvatore. The area is currently very active musically and hosts the Society for Baratelli Concerts, the Alfredo Casella music conservatory, the Aquila Soloists Orchestra, and the Abruzzo Symphonic Association. Both the Teatro Comunale and the conservatory serve as venues for musical performances.

The Marrucini Theater, in Chieti, was built in 1818 and originally named for king Ferdinand of the Kingdom of the Two Sicilies at the time. It is the oldest opera venue in Abruzzo and retains much of its original configuration. Other noteworthy theaters in the province are the Teatro Fedele Fenaroli and the Diocleziano auditorium, both in the town of Lanciano. The town of Ortona hosts the Center for Musicological Studies, the Abruzzo music library, and the Tosti Archives (named for the composer, born in Ortona).

Pescara is the site of the Luisa D'Annunzio music conservatory (named for the mother of author Gabriele D'Annunzio, born in Abruzzo) and also the site of the annual Pescara Jazz, one of the most noteworthy such festivals in Italy. The D'Annuzio Theater, built in 1963, is an important venue, as is the auditorium of the music conservatory. An ex-Bourbon barracks houses the Museum and Library of the Peoples of Abruzzo, an important source for ethnomusicological research. Since 2023, the La notte dei serpenti event, which consists of a modern reinterpretation of Abruzzo folk songs, has been conceived by the composer, conductor and musician from Abruzzo Enrico Melozzi, and is sponsored by the municipality of Pescara and the Abruzzo region and will be broadcast again on TV from 2023 on the Rai networks, and takes place on the Pescara seafront.

The cathedral of Teramo, named for San Bernardo was historically the site of noteworthy performances of sacred music as well as music in private theaters on the premises of a number of aristocratic villas in the area. Currently, the town has the Teatro Comunale, built in the early 20th century.
