= Albania in the Eurovision Song Contest 2023 =

- Eurovision Song Contest 2023
- Participating broadcaster: Radio Televizioni Shqiptar (RTSH)
- Country: Albania
- Selection process: Festivali i Këngës 61
- Selection date: 22 December 2022

Competing entry
- Song: "Duje"
- Artist: Albina and Familja Kelmendi
- Songwriters: Enis Mullaj; Eriona Rushiti

Placement
- Semi-final result: Qualified (9th, 83 points)
- Final result: 22nd, 76 points

Participation chronology

Albania was represented at the Eurovision Song Contest 2023 with the song "Duje" performed by Albina and Familja Kelmendi. Its entry was selected through a dedicated televoting process during the national selection competition Festivali i Këngës organised by Radio Televizioni Shqiptar (RTSH) in December 2022. Up until point, the nation had participated in the Eurovision Song Contest 18 times since its debut in 2004.

Assigned to the second semi-final on 11 May 2023, Albania placed 9th with a total of 83 points and qualified for the final. At the conclusion of the final on 13 May, the nation placed 22nd with a total of 76 points. This was the 11th occasion that Albania qualified for the final out of the 19 times it had participated in Eurovision.

== Background ==
The Eurovision Song Contest is broadcast in Albania by the national broadcaster, Radio Televizioni Shqiptar (RTSH), which also organises Festivali i Këngës as the national selection contest for Eurovision. Prior to the 2023 contest, the nation had participated in the contest 18 times since its first entry in 2004. It achieved its highest placement in the in 2012, securing the fifth place with the song "Suus" performed by Rona Nishliu. The second-highest finish was seventh place in 2004, with the song "The Image of You" by Anjeza Shahini. Albania had previously failed to qualify for the final on nine occasions, most recently in 2022. On 3 June 2022, RTSH announced the nation's participation in the 2023 contest and the European Broadcasting Union (EBU) confirmed its intent to participate on 20 October. Once again, the nation announced the use of Festivali i Këngës to help select its entry.

== Before Eurovision ==
=== Festivali i Këngës ===
The representative for Albania in the Eurovision Song Contest 2023 was chosen during the 61st edition of Festivali i Këngës. The festival was organised by the national broadcaster RTSH in December 2022 and was hosted by Albanian presenter Arbana Osmani. The event was held at the Palace of Congresses in Tirana, Albania and consisted of three semi-finals on the respective dates of 19, 20 and 21 December and a final round on 22 December 2022. Following an application process, 26 participants were selected by RTSH to compete.

The selection process underwent a significant transformation, shifting from an exclusive jury voting to a system involving both public and jury voting. While the jury retained the authority to choose the top three, the overall winner no longer received an automatic Eurovision invitation. Instead, the Albanian representative was selected through a dedicated televoting process.

==== Final ====
The final of Festivali i Këngës was held on 22 December 2022. Despite Elsa Lila's win in the jury vote with "Evita", Albina and Familja Kelmendi with the song "Duje" won the public vote and were chosen as Albanian representatives for the Eurovision Song Contest 2023.

Key: Winner Second place Third place

Final–22 December 2022
| R/O | Artist | Song | Place |
|---|---|---|---|
| 1 | 2 Farm | "Atomike" | 3 |
| 2 | Sergio Hajdini | "Vështirë" | —N/a |
| 3 | Gjergj Kaçinari | "Dje" | —N/a |
| 4 | Alban Kondi and Lore | "Melodi" | —N/a |
| 5 | Vanesa Sono | "Aroma jonë" | —N/a |
| 6 | Elsa Lila | "Evita" | 1 |
| 7 | Erma Mici | "Kozmosi i dashurisë" | —N/a |
| 8 | Franc Koruni | "Në pritje" | —N/a |
| 9 | Gent Hoxha | "Ajër" | —N/a |
| 10 | Petrit Çarkaxhiu | "Emri yt mirësi" | —N/a |
| 11 | Melodajna Mancaku | "Gjysma e zemrës sime" | —N/a |
| 12 | Manjola Nallbani | "Duaj" | —N/a |
| 13 | Urban Band | "Në çdo hap" | —N/a |
| 14 | Enxhi Nasufi | "Burrë" | —N/a |
| 15 | Rovena Dilo | "Motit" | —N/a |
| 16 | Fifi | "Stop" | —N/a |
| 17 | Rezarta Smaja | "N'Eden" | —N/a |
| 18 | Evi Reçi | "Ma kthe" | —N/a |
| 19 | Fabian Basha | "Një gotë" | —N/a |
| 20 | Albina and Familja Kelmendi | "Duje" | 2 |
| 21 | Lynx | "Nëse ke besim" | —N/a |

=== Preparation and promotion ===
On 10 March 2023, a revamped version of "Duje" was released alongside the premiere of a music video on the official YouTube channel of the Eurovision Song Contest. Changes to the song pertained to its orchestration, while the bulk of the song remained the same as had been previously performed. Ahead of the contest, Albina and Familja Kelmendi conducted promotional activities in April 2023. This included appearing as one of 14 contest participants on 1 April at the Polish Eurovision Party in Warsaw, followed on 8 April by an appearance as one of 18 contest participants at the fifth annual Israel Calling event in Tel Aviv. The next weekend saw the group at the Eurovision in Concert series in Amsterdam, Netherlands on 15 April.

== At Eurovision ==
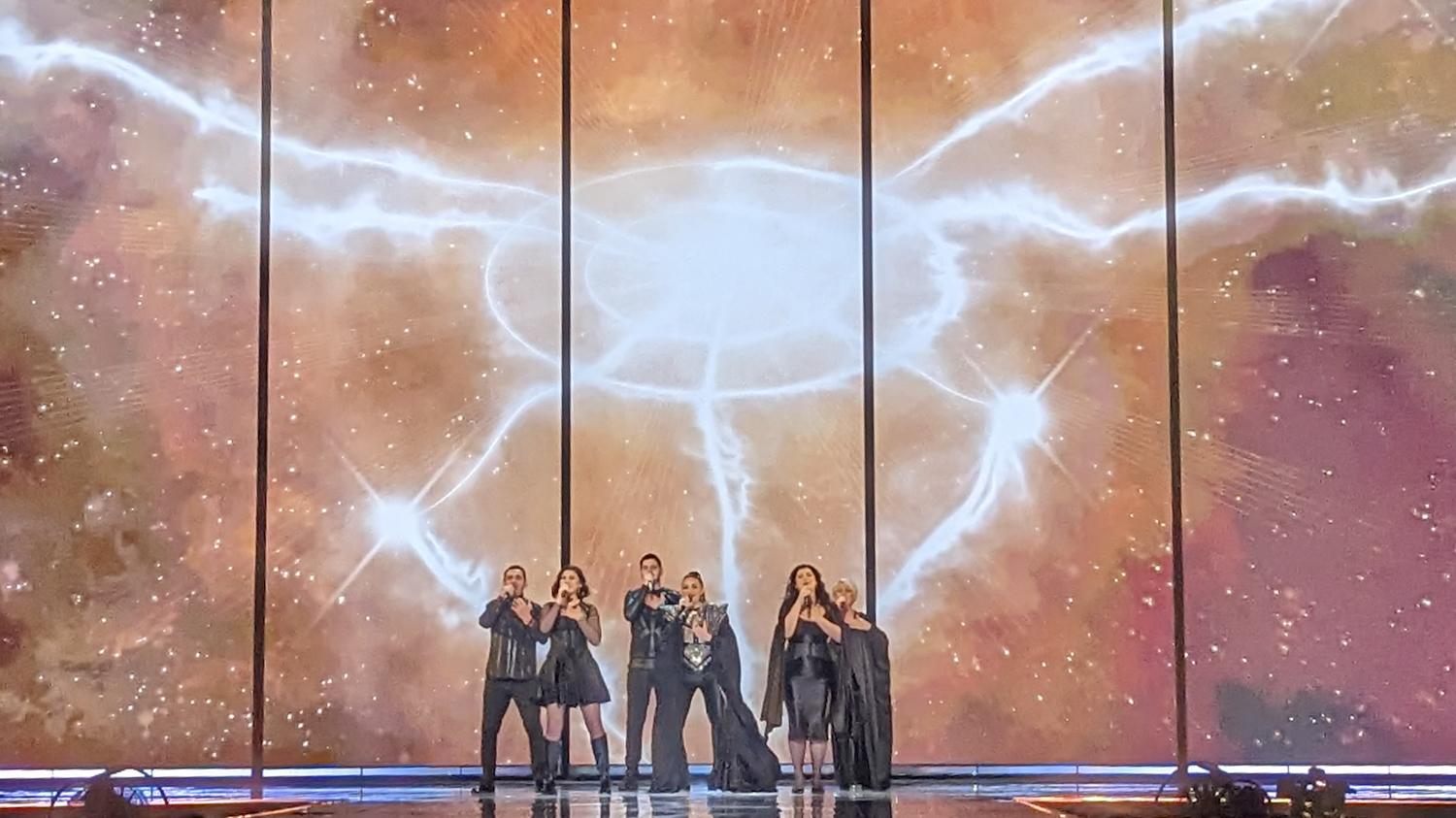
Albina and Familja Kelmendi in rendition of "Duje" during their performance at the Eurovision Song Contest 2023.

The Eurovision Song Contest 2023 was hosted at the Liverpool Arena in Liverpool, United Kingdom; it comprised two semi-finals held on 9 and 11 May, respectively, and a final on 13 May 2023. According to the Eurovision regulations, all participating countries, except for the host nation and the "Big Five" of France, Germany, Italy, Spain, and the United Kingdom, were required to qualify from one of the two semi-finals to participate in the final. The top 10 countries from each semi-final proceeded to the final.

Prior to the allocation draw, the EBU categorised the participating countries into six pots based on previous voting patterns to minimise the chance of neighborly voting. On 31 January 2023, the allocation draw at St George's Hall in Liverpool determined each nation's semi-final and which half of the semi-final they would compete in. Therein, Albania was scheduled for the second half of the second semi-final. Following the release of all entries, the producers of the contest on 22 March arranged the semi-final running order to avoid grouping similar songs; Albania was given 14th in the running order, following Austria and preceding Lithuania.

=== Performances ===
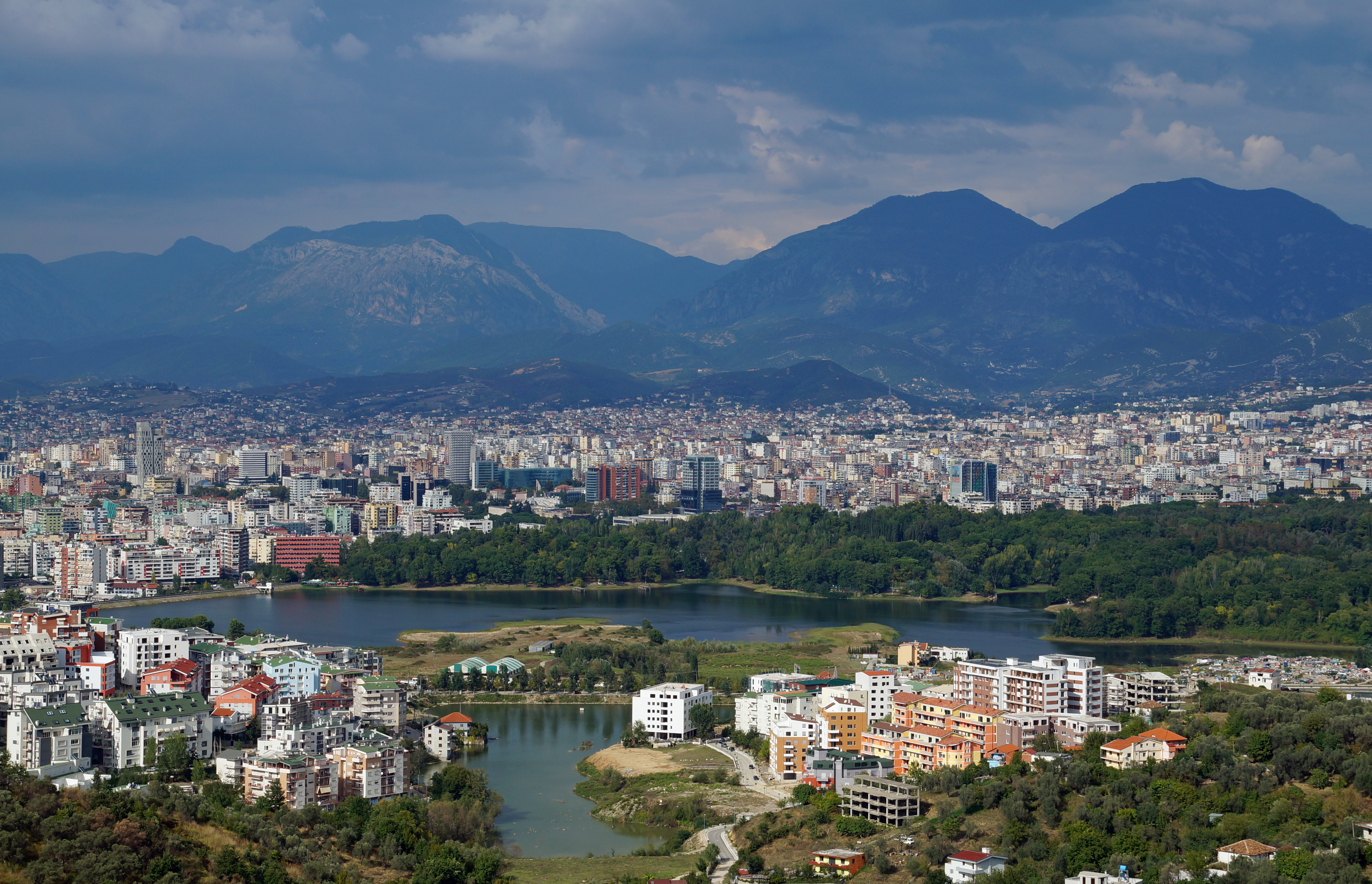
The Albanian introductory postcard was filmed, among others, at the Grand Park of Tirana, Albania.

Albania's participation in the 2023 contest encompassed a series of rehearsals, beginning with the first rehearsal on 2 May and following by the second rehearsal on 5 May. Furthermore, the dress rehearsals for the second semi-final occurred on 8 and 9 May that provided a comprehensive preview of their stage performance in preparation for the live broadcast. The Albanian performance was directed by Swedish artistic director Sacha Jean-Baptiste, who had previously directed the staging for Albania in the 2021 contest. The stage presentation showcased a dark color scheme, integrating black and red reminiscent of the Albanian flag on LED screens. Dynamic elements, including flames and pyrotechnics, were also incorporated into the staging. The introductory postcards for the contest comprised three distinct international locations selected to convey a connecting theme. Filmed at the Arboretum Sofiyivka in Uman, Ukraine, Sefton Park in Liverpool, UK, and Grand Park of Tirana, Albania, the postcard with Albina and Familja Kelmendi showed a family sharing a traditional Albanian meal in the Grand Park.

Soon after securing a place in the final following its ninth-place finish in the semi-final, a winners' press conference convened for the 10 qualifying nations. During this event, the qualifying artists participated in a draw to determine their placement in the final. The draw followed the order of appearance in the semi-final running order, with Albania being drawn to perform in the first half. Subsequently, the show's producers established the running order for the final, assigning Albania the 10th position, succeeding Sweden and preceding Italy. In the final, Albania placed 22nd of the 26 finalists.

=== Voting ===
The voting system during the shows of the contest encompassed the allocation of points by countries on a scale of 1–8, 10 and 12, with one set of points determined by their professional jury and another from televoting. However, in the semi-final, the results relied exclusively on the televoting, aligning with the format between 2004 and 2007. The jury of each nation comprised five music industry professionals, all of whom held citizenship in the respective country they represented. These jurors assessed each entry based on criteria such as vocal capacity, stage performance, and song composition and originality, as well as the overall impression left by the act. For the voting portion of the final, Andri Xhahu served as the Albanian spokesperson announcing the country's jury voting results.

In the 2023 contest, Albania participated in the second semi-final and finished in 9th position with a total of 83 points. This was the 11th time that Albania had qualified for the final, out of the 19 times it had participated in Eurovision. Slovenia and the Rest of the World each awarded 12 points to the nation, followed by Greece with 10 points and Belgium and Romania with 8 points each. In the final, Albania finished in the 22nd position with a total of 76 points. Switzerland's televoting granted 12 points to the nation, while Azerbaijan's jury and Germany's televoting both awarded 8 points. Albania's televoting granted 12 points to Australia in the second semi-final; in the final, the nation's jury awarded 12 points to Sweden and its televoting 12 points to Italy. Below is a breakdown that provides a detailed overview of the points awarded to Albania in both the second semi-final and final of the 2023 contest, along with the corresponding allocations by Albania on both occasions. Furthermore, it includes a breakdown of the jury voting and televoting conducted during the two live shows.

==== Points awarded to Albania ====
Points awarded to Albania (Semi-final 2)
| Score | Televote |
|---|---|
| 12 points | Rest of the World; Slovenia |
| 10 points | Greece |
| 8 points | Belgium; Romania |
| 7 points | Armenia |
| 6 points | Austria |
| 5 points | United Kingdom |
| 4 points | Poland |
| 3 points | Australia; Denmark |
| 2 points | Iceland; Spain |
| 1 point | Cyprus |

Points awarded to Albania (Final)
| Score | Televote | Jury |
|---|---|---|
| 12 points | Switzerland | |
| 10 points | | |
| 8 points | Germany | Azerbaijan |
| 7 points | Italy; Slovenia | |
| 6 points | Croatia; Rest of the World | |
| 5 points | | Romania |
| 4 points | Greece | |
| 3 points | Austria; Belgium; Malta | Greece |
| 2 points | | |
| 1 point | | Moldova |

==== Points awarded by Albania ====
Points awarded by Albania (Semi-final 2)
| Score | Televote |
|---|---|
| 12 points | Australia |
| 10 points | Austria |
| 8 points | Armenia |
| 7 points | Poland |
| 6 points | Cyprus |
| 5 points | Lithuania |
| 4 points | Slovenia |
| 3 points | Belgium |
| 2 points | Estonia |
| 1 point | Iceland |

Points awarded by Albania (Final)
| Score | Televote | Jury |
|---|---|---|
| 12 points | Italy | Sweden |
| 10 points | Sweden | Armenia |
| 8 points | Croatia | Estonia |
| 7 points | Cyprus | Switzerland |
| 6 points | Finland | Israel |
| 5 points | Israel | Belgium |
| 4 points | Norway | Cyprus |
| 3 points | France | Australia |
| 2 points | Slovenia | Italy |
| 1 point | Poland | Spain |

==== Detailed voting results ====
The following members comprised the Albanian jury:

- Sonila Djepaxhia
- Josif Gjipali
- Sokol Marsi
- Eneda Tarifa
- Haig Zacharian

Detailed voting results from Albania (Semi-final 2)
| R/O | Country | Televote | |
| R/O | Country | Rank | Points |
|---|---|---|---|
| 01 | Denmark | 12 | |
| 02 | Armenia | 3 | 8 |
| 03 | Romania | 14 | |
| 04 | Estonia | 9 | 2 |
| 05 | Belgium | 8 | 3 |
| 06 | Cyprus | 5 | 6 |
| 07 | Iceland | 10 | 1 |
| 08 | Greece | 11 | |
| 09 | Poland | 4 | 7 |
| 10 | Slovenia | 7 | 4 |
| 11 | Georgia | 13 | |
| 12 | San Marino | 15 | |
| 13 | Austria | 2 | 10 |
| 14 | Albania | | |
| 15 | Lithuania | 6 | 5 |
| 16 | Australia | 1 | 12 |

Detailed voting results from Albania (Final)
| R/O | Country | Jury | | | | | | | Televote | |
| R/O | Country | Juror 1 | Juror 2 | Juror 3 | Juror 4 | Juror 5 | Rank | Points | Rank | Points |
|---|---|---|---|---|---|---|---|---|---|---|
| 01 | Austria | 24 | 25 | 21 | 15 | 14 | 25 | | 20 | |
| 02 | Portugal | 8 | 14 | 20 | 16 | 22 | 18 | | 25 | |
| 03 | Switzerland | 2 | 3 | 2 | 10 | 17 | 4 | 7 | 18 | |
| 04 | Poland | 23 | 15 | 11 | 17 | 18 | 19 | | 10 | 1 |
| 05 | Serbia | 15 | 16 | 23 | 18 | 19 | 24 | | 21 | |
| 06 | France | 11 | 4 | 10 | 21 | 20 | 14 | | 8 | 3 |
| 07 | Cyprus | 16 | 5 | 3 | 11 | 16 | 7 | 4 | 4 | 7 |
| 08 | Spain | 10 | 6 | 4 | 22 | 23 | 10 | 1 | 19 | |
| 09 | Sweden | 1 | 1 | 12 | 1 | 1 | 1 | 12 | 2 | 10 |
| 10 | Albania | | | | | | | | | |
| 11 | Italy | 4 | 17 | 6 | 12 | 9 | 9 | 2 | 1 | 12 |
| 12 | Estonia | 3 | 19 | 5 | 2 | 3 | 3 | 8 | 14 | |
| 13 | Finland | 25 | 18 | 24 | 14 | 12 | 22 | | 5 | 6 |
| 14 | Czech Republic | 5 | 21 | 13 | 13 | 8 | 13 | | 15 | |
| 15 | Australia | 6 | 20 | 14 | 4 | 7 | 8 | 3 | 24 | |
| 16 | Belgium | 9 | 7 | 15 | 5 | 6 | 6 | 5 | 17 | |
| 17 | Armenia | 17 | 11 | 1 | 3 | 2 | 2 | 10 | 12 | |
| 18 | Moldova | 22 | 12 | 17 | 19 | 15 | 21 | | 16 | |
| 19 | Ukraine | 18 | 22 | 16 | 20 | 4 | 16 | | 11 | |
| 20 | Norway | 12 | 23 | 22 | 25 | 13 | 23 | | 7 | 4 |
| 21 | Germany | 21 | 24 | 18 | 7 | 11 | 17 | | 22 | |
| 22 | Lithuania | 19 | 10 | 9 | 8 | 10 | 15 | | 23 | |
| 23 | Israel | 13 | 8 | 8 | 6 | 5 | 5 | 6 | 6 | 5 |
| 24 | Slovenia | 14 | 2 | 25 | 23 | 21 | 12 | | 9 | 2 |
| 25 | Croatia | 20 | 9 | 19 | 24 | 25 | 20 | | 3 | 8 |
| 26 | United Kingdom | 7 | 13 | 7 | 9 | 24 | 11 | | 13 | |
