= Duje (song) =

2022 song by Albina & Familja Kelmendi

Single by Albina & Familja Kelmendi
- Language: Albanian
- English title: Love it
- Released: 10 March 2023
- Genre: Pop
- Length: 3:07
- Label: Fole
- Composer: Enis Mullaj
- Lyricist: Eriona Rushiti

Albina Kelmendi singles chronology
"Emri Im" (2023)	"Duje" (2023)	"Inat" (2023)

Alternative cover
- Cover of the song's original version

Music video
- "Duje" on YouTube

Eurovision Song Contest 2023 entry
- Country: Albania
- Artists: Albina & Familja Kelmendi
- Language: Albanian
- Composer: Enis Mullaj
- Lyricist: Eriona Rushiti

Finals performance
- Semi-final result: 9th
- Semi-final points: 83
- Final result: 22nd
- Final points: 76

Entry chronology
- ◄ "Sekret" (2022)
- "Titan" (2024) ►

Official performance video
- "Duje" (Second Semi-Final) on YouTube "Duje" (Grand Final) on YouTube

"Duje" (Albanian pronunciation: [ˈdujɛ]; transl. "Love it") is a song by Kosovar singer Albina Kelmendi and five members of her family. Composed by Enis Mullaj with lyrics written by Eriona Rushiti, it is an Albanian-language pop song that tells the tale of a family's struggle to stay united through a difficult time. The song was released as a single on Spotify on 29 December 2022 and on Apple Music on 20 March 2023.

The artists competed with "Duje" in the 61st edition of Festivali i Këngës and won the televote of the competition, which resulted in them representing Albania in the Eurovision Song Contest 2023. A revamped version of the song was released as a single for streaming and digital download on 10 March 2023, accompanied by a music video.

== Background and composition ==
"Duje" was composed by Enis Mullaj and its lyrics were written by Eriona Rushiti. Albina and Familja Kelmendi competed with the song in the 61st edition of Festivali i Këngës and won the "second prize". They also won the televote of the competition which was Albania's selection for that year's Eurovision Song Contest. After they were selected to represent Albania in the Eurovision Song Contest 2023, Albina Kelmendi "stated that the song would undergo a revamp but it would remain in the Albanian language".

Musically, "Duje" is an Albanian-language pop song telling the story of a family's struggle to stay united through a difficult time. The song was released as a single by Acromax Media GmbH on Spotify on 29 December 2022 and on Apple Music on 20 March 2023. A revamped version, which represented Albania in the Eurovision Song Contest 2023, was released as a single for streaming and digital download by Fole Publishing on 10 March 2023.

== Eurovision Song Contest ==
=== Festivali i Këngës ===
The 61st edition of Festivali i Këngës was organised by Radio Televizioni Shqiptar (RTSH) in order to determine Albania's representative for the Eurovision Song Contest 2023. In early September 2022 it was reported that RTSH had decided to select the winner of the festival using a system containing a public vote. On 28 October 2022, the voting system of Festivali i Këngës was confirmed: the top three and two prizes would be, as usual, selected by the jury, but the winner of the festival would not receive an official invitation to participate in the Eurovision Song Contest, as in the previous years. Instead, the Albanian Eurovision representative would be selected by a separate televoting system.

"Duje" competed in the first semi-final of that year's contest. As Albina was considered an Established artist, she would automatically move onto the final of the contest. Heading into the final, the song was a fan favorite to win the televoting, winning fan polls on Eurovision fansites Wiwibloggs and ESCUnited. In the final, "Duje" would come second in the jury voting, being beaten by Elsa Lila's song, "Evita" as the overall winner of Festivali i Këngës 61. However, "Duje" would come first overall in the televote, earning the Albanian spot for the Eurovision Song Contest 2023.

=== At Eurovision ===
According to Eurovision rules, all participating countries, with the exception of the host nation and the "Big Five", consisting of France, Germany, Italy, Spain and the United Kingdom, are required to qualify from one of two semi-finals in order to compete for the final; the top ten countries from each semi-final progress to the final.

== Release history ==
Release dates and formats for "Duje"
Region	Date	Format(s)	Version	Label	Ref.
Various	29 December 2022	Digital download; streaming	Festivali i Këngës	Acromax	
Various	20 March 2023	Digital download; streaming	Festivali i Këngës	Acromax	
Various	10 March 2023	Digital download; streaming	Eurovision Song Contest 2023	Fole	
