= Lorè =

Albanian singer and songwriter (born 1996)

- Born: Lorela Karoshi; July 7, 1995 (age 30); Tirana, Albania
- Occupations: Singer, songwriter, composer
- Years active: 2013–present
- Musical career
- Genres: pop
- Instruments: Vocals
- Label: Folé Publishing

Lorela Karoshi (born 7 July 1995), known professionally as Lorè, is an Albanian singer, songwriter and composer.

== Life and career ==
Growing up, Lorè was influenced by the music of Janis Joplin and Otis Redding, which shaped her musical journey. Her first exposure to the stage came on the talent show The Voice of Albania, where she showcased her vocal talents under the mentorship of Elton Deda.

In 2014, she represented Albania at the Univision Festival for young artists in Azerbaijan, performing a rendition of “Royals”.

Lorè’s recording career began in 2015 with her debut single, "Hungover by a Dream". The following year, she teamed up with DJ Aldo on the track "Don’t Let Me Go". In 2017, she participated at Festivali i Këngës, performing the song "Me Ty", produced by Alban Kondi.

Around this time, Lorè began writing her own material, releasing the new single "Tonight", in collaboration with Vin Veli.

== Discography ==
=== Singles ===
Year	Song
2022	"Fajet"
2023	"Funk It"
2024	"Po largohem"
2024	"Të du"
2024	"Malli më ka marrë"
2024	"Si ti"
2024	"Për ne yjet ndizen lart"
2025	"Si t'ja them"
2025	"Dritat"
2025	"Amanet"
2026	"Ni Ni" (feat. MC Kresha)
2026	"Ndoshta ti" (feat. Cricket, Elinel)
2026	"Dashni 2" (feat. Majk)
