= Albina Kelmendi =

Kosovar singer and songwriter (born 1998)

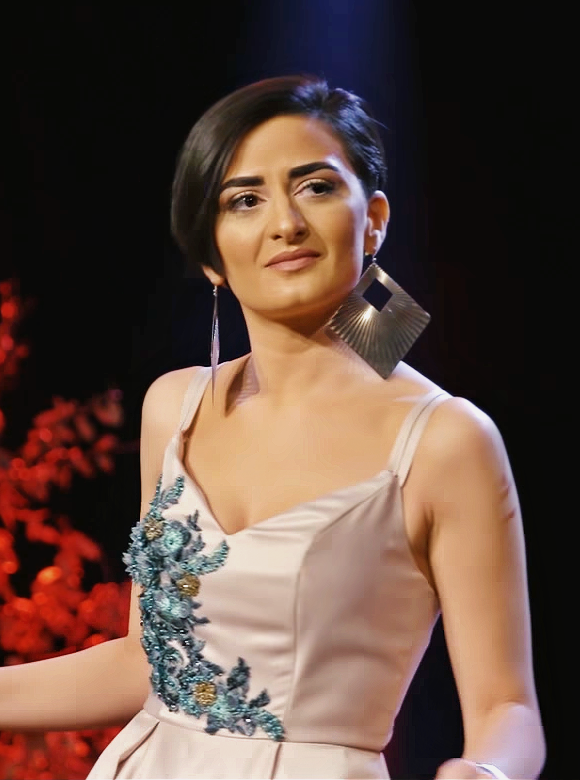
- Kelmendi in 2019

Background information
- Born: 27 January 1998 (age 28); Peja, AP Kosovo, FR Yugoslavia (present-day Kosovo)
- Genre: Pop
- Occupations: Singer; songwriter
- Instruments: Vocals; clarinet; piano
- Years active: 2013–present
- Label: Folé Publishing

Albina Kelmendi (Albanian pronunciation: [alˈbina kɛlˈmɛndi]; born 27 January 1998) is a Kosovar singer and songwriter. She rose to fame after placing as the runner-up on the fourth series of The Voice of Albania in 2014. Kelmendi and her family represented Albania in the Eurovision Song Contest 2023 with the song "Duje".

== Early life ==
Albina Kelmendi was born in Pejë, Kosovo (then part of FR Yugoslavia). She studied clarinet and piano at the Halit Kasapolli music school in her hometown, and started performing together with her family under the name Family Band.

== Career ==
=== 2014–2021: The Voice of Albania and Top Fest ===
In 2014, she auditioned for the fourth series of The Voice of Albania. After getting chair turns from all four coaches, she joined Team Elsa. She finished as the runner-up of the season.

The Voice of Albania performances
Round	Song	Original artist(s)	Notes
Blind auditions	"Something's Got a Hold on Me"	Etta James	Four-chair turn, joined Team Elsa
Battle	"Run Baby Run"	Sheryl Crow	Won against Nilsa Hysi
Knock Out	"Suus"	Rona Nishliu	Won against Xhejni Memlikaj
Live shows	"Tomlin e nanës"	Jericho	
Live shows	"Serenata e Shubertit"	Frederik Ndoci	
Live shows	"All for Love"	Bryan Adams, Rod Stewart, Sting	With Team Elsa
Semi-final	"It's a Man's Man's Man's World"	James Brown	
Final	"Zgjohu"	Jericho	
Final	"Unchain My Heart"	Ray Charles	
Final	"Tomlin e nanës"	Jericho	With Jericho

The following year, she took part in the twelfth edition of Top Fest, where she presented the song "Nuk ka ma mire".

=== 2022–present: Nana loke, Festivali i Këngës, and Eurovision Song Contest ===
In June 2022, Albina Kelmendi released her debut album, Nana loke. In December of the same year, she and five members of her family took part in the Festivali i Këngës 61 as Albina & Familja Kelmendi, where they presented the song "Duje". While coming in second place on the final night, the result of which was decided by a jury, the public chose her as the Albanian representative at the Eurovision Song Contest 2023 in Liverpool, United Kingdom.

At Eurovision in Liverpool, she performed in the second semi-final on 11 May 2023, and managed to successfully qualify to the final. She placed 22nd in the grand final.

== Discography ==
=== Studio albums ===
List of studio albums with album details
Title	Album details
Nana loke	Released: 25 June 2022; Label: Fole Publishing

=== Singles ===
==== As lead artist ====
List of singles as lead artist, showing year released and album name
Title	Year	Album
"Ëndrrën mos ma merr"	2015	Non-album singles
"Hera e parë"	2016	Non-album singles
"Denim" (with Sinan Vllasaliu)	2018	Non-album singles
"Shko"	2020	Non-album singles
"Një takim" (with Taulant Bajraliu)	2020	Non-album singles
"Ishim"	2020	Non-album singles
"Mos më lini vet"	2020	Non-album singles
"Ta fali zemra"	2020	Non-album singles
"Vjet e mija po kalojn"	2020	Non-album singles
"Hallakam" (with Labinot Tahiri)	2020	Non-album singles
"Ç'ka don tash prej meje" (with Ymer Bajrami)	2020	Non-album singles
"Mirazh"	2021	Non-album singles
"Kur ta ktheva Kosovë shpinën"	2021	Non-album singles
"Vullkan"	2021	Non-album singles
"Zot mos e bo"	2021	Non-album singles
"E kom prej teje"	2021	Non-album singles
"Pa mu"	2021	Non-album singles
"Çikë e bukur"	2021	Non-album singles
"Moj e mira te pojata"	2021	Non-album singles
"Jetoj me shpresë"	2022	Non-album singles
"Nanë moj kom gabu"	2022	Non-album singles
"Sytë e tu"	2022	Non-album singles
"Emri im"	2023	Non-album singles
"Duje" (Note: Credited as Albina & Familja Kelmendi.)	2023	Non-album singles
"Inat"	2023	Non-album singles

== Notes ==
Awards and achievements
Preceded by Ronela Hajati with "Sekret"	Albania in the Eurovision Song Contest; 2023	Succeeded by Besa with "Titan"
