= The Voice of Albania =

- Genre: Talent show
- Created by: John de Mol Jr.
- Presented by: Ledion Liço
- Judges: Alma Bektashi; Sidrit Bejleri; Elton Deda; Miriam Cani; Aurela Gaçe; Elsa Lila; Genc Salihu; Jonida Maliqi; Alban Skënderaj; Besa Kokëdhima; Rona Nishliu; Naim Bujaku
- Countries of origin: Albania; Kosovo
- Original language: Albanian
- No. of seasons: 6
- No. of episodes: 100+

Production
- Production locations: Tirana, Albania
- Running time: 120 min – 180 min
- Production companies: Talpa Network; Top Channel

Original release
- Network: Top Channel
- Release: October 21, 2011 – May 19, 2017

Related
- Albania's Got Talent; The Voice Kids (Albanian TV series)

The Voice of Albania is an Albanian television reality singing competition created by John de Mol Jr. and is part of The Voice franchise. It began airing on Top Channel on October 21, 2011.

Top Channel ended the show, because they began the second season of the Kids version, which started airing on January 19, 2018.

== Format ==
There are 6 stages to the competition:

=== Pre-auditions ===
The first stage of the show is not broadcast. The producers of the show audition all the artists that submitted their selves through the form on the website.

=== Blind auditions ===
The second phase is the "blind auditions". There, the contestant have to sing alone in front of live audiences. The 4 jury members are sitting in a swivel chair with their back to the stage and cannot see the candidates. During the performance, they can elect to support a candidate by pressing a buzzer, which will automatically turn their seat towards the stage. The candidate continues to the next round if he or she receives at least one of the four jury votes. The candidate chooses a coach for the further rounds from all jury members who supported him or her.

=== Battle Rounds ===
Before the battle round, the coaches prepare their candidates for a week of training. In the Battle Round, two candidates of the same coaching group sing a song in the duo. Only one of the two candidates is further selected by the respective coach. In some seasons, by pressing a button, other coaches can "steal" a contestant who was voted off by their own coach. As in the blind auditions, if more than one coach presses their button, the contestant chooses which coach they want. Each coach has a set number of steals.

=== Knockouts ===
- Seasons 3–5

As in the battle rounds, coaches put two of their own team members to compete against each other. This time, the contestants choose their own song to perform individually while the other watches and waits. After that, the coach chooses one to advance while the other is sent home. Some series include steals. Like in the battle round, the opposing coaches can steal a contestant who was voted off by their own coach by pressing their button. Similar to the blind auditions, if more than one coach presses their button, the contestant chooses which coach they want.

=== SuperBattles ===
- Season 6

During this round will advance four artists to the next stage of the competition, the Live Shows. In this round, in a format similar to The X Factor's Six-Seat Challenge, there will be four seats. After a contestant performs a song of their choice, he or she will sit in one of these seats; this will occur for the first four artists performing on a team. However, after these first contestants perform, the fate of the fifth artist will be decided based on whether their coach would like to switch out an artist already seated in favor of this performer. In the case of a switch-out, the artist that was switched out will be eliminated, and this performer will sit down. If the coach would instead like to keep the performers already seated and thus not give a seat to this performer, he or she will be immediately eliminated. After all artists have performed, those who end up seated will advance to the Live Shows.

=== Live shows ===
In the final performance phase of the competition, the top contestants from each team compete against each other during a live broadcast. The television audience vote to save one contestant on each team, leaving the coach to decide on live television who they want to save and who will not move on. In the next round, the public chooses between the two artists left on each team, and the coach also has a vote that weighs equally with the public vote.

Finally, each coach will have his/her best contestant left standing to compete in the finals, singing an original song. From these four, one will be named "The Voice"—and will receive the grand prize of a recording contract.

== Coaches and hosts ==
=== Coaches' timeline ===
| Coaches | Seasons | | | | | |
| Coaches | 1 | 2 | 3 | 4 | 5 | 6 |
|---|---|---|---|---|---|---|
| Alma | | | | | | |
| Sidrit | | | | | | |
| Elton | | | | | | |
| Miriam | | | | | | |
| Aurela | | | | | | |
| Genc | | | | | | |
| Elsa | | | | | | |
| Jonida | | | | | | |
| Alban | | | | | | |
| Besa | | | | | | |
| Rona | | | | | | |
| Xuxi | | | | | | |

=== Hosts ===
| Hosts | Seasons | | | | | |
| Hosts | 1 | 2 | 3 | 4 | 5 | 6 |
|---|---|---|---|---|---|---|
| Ledion Liço | | | | | | |
| Marina | | | | | | |
| Kiara | | | | | | |
| Mishel | | | | | | |
| Fjoralba | | | | | | |

Key
Main host
Backstage host

== Season summary ==
Artist's info

Team Sidrit
Team Alma
Team Miriam
Team Elton
Team Aurela
Team Genc
Team Elsa
Team Jonida
Team Besa
Team Rona
Team Alban
Team Xuxi

| Season | First aired | Last aired | Winner | Runner-up | Other finalist(s) | | Winning coach | Presenter | Coaches (chair's order) | | | |
| Season | First aired | Last aired | Winner | Runner-up | Other finalist(s) | | Winning coach | Presenter | 1 | 2 | 3 | 4 |
|---|---|---|---|---|---|---|---|---|---|---|---|---|
| 1 | October 21, 2011 | February 10, 2012 | Rina Bilurdagu | Marsela Çibukaj | Enrika Derza | Lundrim Paçuku | Alma Bektashi | Ledion Liço | Sidrit | Alma | Miriam | Elton |
| 2 | October 7, 2012 | January 22, 2013 | Venera Lumani | Mjellma Berisha | Jozefina Simoni | Matej Karaqi | Sidrit Bejleri | Ledion Liço | Miriam | Sidrit | Elton | Alma |
| 3 | October 19, 2013 | January 25, 2014 | Florent Abrashi | Borjana Dojle | Sigi Bastri | Krenar Ismaili | Sidrit Bejleri | Ledion Liço | Sidrit | Alma | Elton | Aurela |
| 4 | October 18, 2014 | January 5, 2015 | Aslaidon Zaimaj | Albina Kelmendi | Semi Jaupaj | Olsa Ballguri | Genc Salihu | Ledion Liço | Genc | Elsa | Alma | Sidrit |
| 5 | January 9, 2016 | April 16, 2016 | Tahir Gjoçi | Lorenc Hasrama | Ina Torba | Elbunit Krasniqi | Sidrit Bejleri | Ledion Liço | Genc | Sidrit | Alma | Jonida |
| 6 | January 27, 2017 | May 19, 2017 | Klinti Çollaku | Lidia Lufi | Lis Asllanaj | Anxhela Elmazi | Alban Skënderaj | Ledion Liço | Xuxi | Besa | Rona | Alban |

=== Season 1 (2011–2012) ===
The first season of The Voice of Albania premiered on October 21, 2011, and ended on February 10, 2012, on Top Channel. The coaches was Miriam Cani, Sidrit Bejleri, Elton Deda and Alma Bektashi. The host was Ledion Liço. The winner of the first version in Albania was Rina Bilurdagu from Team Alma.

=== Season 2 (2012–2013) ===
The second season of The Voice of Albania premiered on October 7, 2012, and ended on January 22, 2013, on Top Channel. The coaches was Miriam Cani, Sidrit Bejleri, Elton Deda and Alma Bektashi. The host was Ledion Liço. The winner of the second version in Albania was Venera Lumani from Team Sidrit.

=== Season 3 (2013–2014) ===
The third season of The Voice of Albania premiered on October 19, 2013, and ended on January 25, 2014, on Top Channel. The coaches was Sidrit Bejleri, Elton Deda, Alma Bektashi and Aurela Gaçe. The host was Ledion Liço. The winner of the third version in Albania was Florent Abrashi from Team Sidrit.

=== Season 4 (2014–2015) ===
The fourth season of The Voice of Albania premiered on October 18, 2014, and ended on January 5, 2015, on Top Channel. The coaches was Sidrit Bejleri, Alma Bektashi, Elsa Lila and Genc Salihu. The host was Ledion Liço. The winner of the fourth version in Albania was Aslaidon Zaimaj from Team Genc.

=== Season 5 (2016) ===
The fifth season of The Voice of Albania premiered on January 9, 2016, and ended on April 16, 2016, on Top Channel. The coaches was Sidrit Bejleri, Alma Bektashi, Genc Salihu and Jonida Maliqi. The host was Ledion Liço. The winner of the fifth version in Albania was Tahir Gjoçi from Team Sidrit.

=== Season 6 (2017) ===
The sixth season of The Voice of Albania premiered on January 27, 2017, and ended on May 19, 2017, on Top Channel. The coaches was Alban Skënderaj, Besa Kokëdhima, Rona Nishliu and Xuxi. The host was Ledion Liço. The winner of the sixth version in Albania was Klinti Çollaku from Team Alban.

== See also ==
- Top Channel
- The Voice (franchise)
- THe Voice Kids (Albanian TV series)
- The Voice of Holland
