= The Voice of Albania (series 4) =

Season of television series

The fourth season of The Voice of Albania aired from 18 October 2014 to 5 January 2015 on Top Channel. The show is still hosted by Ledion Liço. There were two new judges - Genc Salihu and Elsa Lila, Vodafone Albania sponsored the series and used the slogan "Unique: like your Voice!"

== Blind auditions ==
(Albanian: Audicionet e fshehuras) Each coach has the length of the artists' performance to decide if they want that artist on their team. Should two or more coaches want the same artist, then the artist will choose their coach.

=== Episode 1 (4 October) ===
The series premiere was broadcast on 4 October 2014

Colour key

| ✔ | Coach hit his/her "I WANT YOU" button |
| | Artist defaulted to this coach's team |
| | Artist elected to join this coach's team |
| | Artist eliminated with no coach pressing his or her "I WANT YOU" button |

| Artist | Order | Hometown | Age | Song | Coaches and artists choices | | | |
| Artist | Order | Hometown | Age | Song | Alma | Genc | Sidrit | Elsa |
|---|---|---|---|---|---|---|---|---|
| Xhois Sporeja | 01 | Tirana | 17 | "This World" | ✔ | ✔ | | ✔ |
| Sara Cena | 02 | Tirana | 17 | "Rumour" | | | | |
| Saimir Xhindole | 03 | Elbasan | 30 | "Fati ynë shpresë e marrëzi" | | | | |
| Mark Deda | 04 | Mirditë | 20 | "Give Me Love" | | | | |
| Ketjona Qoshku | 05 | Librazhd | 17 | "Innoncence" | | | | |
| Kejsi Verçani | 06 | Elbasan | 17 | "At Last" | ✔ | ✔ | ✔ | ✔ |
| Jonathan Pilika | 07 | Tirana | 20 | "Your Love Is a Lie" | | | ✔ | |
| Jeton Gashi | 08 | Durrës | 19 | "Solamente Tú" | | | ✔ | |
| Erina Seitllari | 09 | Pogradec | 19 | "Paris (Ooh La La)" | ✔ | ✔ | ✔ | ✔ |
| Bersant Taho | 10 | Vlorë | 45 | "Siamo Soli" | | | | |
| Armand Pistolja | 11 | Krujë | 33 | "Neutron Star Collision" | | ✔ | ✔ | ✔ |
| Argjent Caka | 12 | Krujë | 18 | "Too Close" | | | | |
| Andra Zhjeqi | 13 | Pristina, Kosovo | 17 | "Lullaby of Birdland" | ✔ | ✔ | | ✔ |
| Ambra Mancila | 14 | Tirana | 19 | "Cry Me Out" | | | | |
| Aldo Simoni | 15 | Shkodër | 24 | "You and I Both" | ✔ | ✔ | | |

=== Episode 2 (6 October) ===
The second episode was broadcast on 6 October 2014

| Artist | Order | Hometown | Age | Song | Coaches and artists choices | | | |
| Artist | Order | Hometown | Age | Song | Alma | Genc | Sidrit | Elsa |
|---|---|---|---|---|---|---|---|---|
| Geraldo Spahiu | 01 | Tirana | 18 | "Let Her Go" | ✔ | ✔ | | |
| Dritan Agolli | 02 | Tirana | 30 | "Starlight" | | | | |
| Daniel Cook | 03 | United States | 30 | "Collide" | | ✔ | | ✔ |
| Anna Nika | 04 | Lezhë | 19 | "Note to God" | ✔ | ✔ | ✔ | |
| Andi Stafuka | 05 | Tirana | 20 | "Broken Vow" | | ✔ | | ✔ |
| Laura Veria | 06 | Fier | 24 | "Before He Cheats" | | | | |
| Krisilda Çili | 07 | Korçë | 19 | "S'je më" | | | | |
| Jehona Ibishi | 08 | Sweden | 17 | "Engjëjt qajnë" | | | | |
| Mallengjim Bajrami | 09 | Gjilan, Kosovo | 18 | "Broken Angel" | | | | |
| Majlinda Bajrami | 10 | Gjilan | 20 | "Big White Room" | ✔ | ✔ | ✔ | ✔ |
| Silva Islami | 11 | Tepelenë | 18 | "Hall of Fame" | | | | |
| Shpendi Arapaj | 12 | Durrës | 21 | "Not Over You" | | | | |
| Sara Frisku | 13 | Burrel | 18 | "Stepping Stone" | | | | |
| Olsa Ballguri | 14 | Vlorë | 28 | "Stronger Than Me" | ✔ | ✔ | ✔ | ✔ |
| Lendita Lekaj | 15 | Deçan | 29 | "N/A" | | | | |
| Kasandra Lico | 16 | Tirana | 17 | "Too Little Too Late" | | | | |
| Genti Sheholli | 17 | Pristina | 18 | "I See Fire" | ✔ | ✔ | ✔ | ✔ |
| Daniel Kucaj | 18 | Lezhë | 19 | "This I Love" | | | | |

=== Episode 3 (11 October) ===
The third episode was broadcast on 11 October 2014

| Artist | Order | Hometown | Age | Song | Coaches and artists choices | | | |
| Artist | Order | Hometown | Age | Song | Alma | Genc | Sidrit | Elsa |
|---|---|---|---|---|---|---|---|---|
| Zhorzheta Sota | 01 | N/A | N/A | "Stay With Me" | | ✔ | | |
| Vanesa Basha | 02 | Tirana | 17 | "Songbird" | ✔️ | ✔️ | | ✔️ |
| Stenald Mehilli | 03 | Tirana | 17 | "All of Me" | ✔ | | | |
| Rexhina Doci | 04 | Dibër | 19 | "Shoulder to Shoulder" | | ✔ | | |
| Olta Kaferri | 05 | Peshkopi | 22 | "Sitting on the Dock of the Bay" | ✔ | | | |
| Nilsa Hysi | 06 | Skrapar | 19 | "Oops!... I Did It Again" | ✔ | | | ✔ |
| Kristina Ahmetlli | 07 | Devoll | 20 | "Livin' On a Prayer" | | | | |
| Klint Gaçe | 08 | Vlorë | 18 | "A Thousand Years" | ✔ | ✔ | | |
| Indrit Kaporaj | 09 | Vlorë | 21 | "Refuzoj" | | | | |
| Gezim Metaj | 10 | Pristina | 24 | "No Love Allowed" | | | | ✔ |
| Frenkli Viero | 11 | Vlorë | 19 | "Soldier" | ✔ | ✔ | | ✔ |
| Erodit Haxhia | 12 | Kamenicë | 20 | "Show Me the Meaning of Being Lonely" | | | | |
| Dhimitri Piluri | 13 | Korçë | 23 | "Remember When it Rained" | | | | |
| Blend Qerimaj | 14 | Gjilan | 18 | "Dance With My Father" | | | | |
| Besian Xhindole | 15 | Tirana | 20 | "Save Tonight" | | | | |
| Aleksja Rucaj | 16 | N/A | N/A | "Breakeven" | | | | |
| Albina Kelmendi | 17 | Pejë | 17 | "Something's Got a Hold on Me" | ✔ | ✔ | ✔ | ✔ |
| Alba Ymerhalili | 18 | Pristina | 17 | "One and Only" | ✔ | ✔ | ✔ | ✔ |

=== Episode 4 (13 October) ===
The fourth episode was broadcast on 13 October 2014

| Artist | Order | Hometown | Age | Song | Coaches and artists choices | | | |
| Artist | Order | Hometown | Age | Song | Alma | Genc | Sidrit | Elsa |
|---|---|---|---|---|---|---|---|---|
| Marjela Beçka | 01 | Korçë | 23 | "Unconditionally" | | | | |
| Ylli Haxhiajdini | 02 | Pristina | 17 | "My Heart is Refusing Me" | | | | |
| Venera Pulaj | 03 | Prizren, Kosovo | 18 | "I'd Rather Go Blind" | ✔ | ✔ | | ✔ |
| Ronaldo Heta | 04 | Burrel | 17 | "Story of My Life" | | | | |
| Rinor Sopjani | 05 | Pristina | 20 | "Little Things" | | | ✔ | |
| Megi Laska | 06 | N/A | N/A | "Je Suis Malade" | ✔ | ✔ | | ✔ |
| Markela Toçi | 07 | Elbasan | 20 | "The A Team" | | | | |
| Linda Kasa | 08 | Laç | 33 | "Asnjëherë" | | | | |
| Leonard Kika | 09 | Tirana | 25 | "Rise Like a Phoenix" | | | | |
| Ledi Çanga | 10 | Shkodër | 22 | "Crazy" | ✔ | | | |
| Klajdi Koçllari | 11 | Korçë | 19 | "Numb" | | ✔ | | |
| Justina Zefi | 12 | Shëngjin | 19 | "Wish You Were Here" | | ✔ | ✔ | |
| Greta Kapcari | 13 | Lezhë | 19 | "Crying for No Reason" | | | | |
| Edona Ibishi | 14 | Vushtrri, Kosovo | 24 | "Girl With One Eye" | | | ✔ | ✔ |
| Brian Shkodrani | 15 | Vlorë | 18 | "Sunday Morning" | ✔ | | | |
| Arieta Gashi | 16 | Pristina | 17 | "Broken-Hearted Girl" | | | | |
| Arbi Pelushaj | 17 | Tirana | 17 | "Uncover" | ✔ | | | |
| Alberto Luti | 18 | Tirana | 19 | "Forget Her" | | ✔ | ✔ | ✔ |

=== Episode 5 (18 October) ===
The fifth of the blind auditions was broadcast on 18 October 2014

| Artist | Order | Hometown | Age | Song | Coaches and artists choices | | | |
| Artist | Order | Hometown | Age | Song | Alma | Genc | Sidrit | Elsa |
|---|---|---|---|---|---|---|---|---|
| Xhojkena Kadiu | 01 | Tirana | 17 | "Toxic" | ✔ | | | ✔ |
| Semi Jaupaj | 02 | N/A | N/A | "Listen" | ✔ | ✔ | ✔ | ✔ |
| Romina Shyle | 03 | Tirana | 17 | "Nightingale" | ✔ | | ✔ | |
| Malvina Ndoj | 04 | Mamurras | 22 | "Paris (Ooh La La)" | | | | |
| Kleopatra Petro | 05 | Gjirokastër | 19 | "When You're Gone" | | | | |
| Keivis Radovicka | 06 | Tirana | 17 | "Come and Get It" | | | | |
| Hadis Alla | 07 | Shkodër | 21 | "Counting Stars" | | | | |
| Gresa Sekiraxha | 08 | Pristina | 18 | "Nobody's Perfect" | | ✔ | | ✔ |
| Globi Selaj | 09 | Prizren | 17 | "All of Me" | | | | ✔ |
| Gezim Xhaxhaj | 10 | Lushnje | N/A | "O Sole Mio" | | | | ✔ |
| Fatjona Zahaj | 11 | Vlorë | 17 | "Wild" | | | ✔ | |
| Erinda Kananaj | 12 | Përmet | 25 | "We Found Love" | | | | ✔ |
| Ergi Lami | 13 | Burrel | 18 | "The A Team" | ✔ | | | ✔ |
| Elmedina Teodori | 14 | Vienna, Austria | 18 | "Best Thing I Never Had" | | | | |
| Elbasan Krasniqi | 15 | Gjilan | 24 | "Feeling Good" | | | | |
| Aulona Zaçaj | 16 | Tirana | 21 | "Never Be the Same" | | | | |
| Ana Luto | 17 | Ballsh | 20 | "I See Fire" | | | | |
| Albi Delibashi | 18 | Fier | 23 | "Someday" | | | ✔ | |

=== Episode 6 (20 October) ===
The sixth and final episode of the blind auditions was broadcast on 18 October 2014

| Artist | Order | Hometown | Age | Song | Coaches and artists choices | | | |
| Artist | Order | Hometown | Age | Song | Alma | Genc | Sidrit | Elsa |
|---|---|---|---|---|---|---|---|---|
| Adi Sulejmani | 01 | Shkodër | 24 | "No Apologies" | | | | |
| Andi Skerja | 02 | Tirana | 18 | "All of Me" | ✔ | | ✔ | ✔ |
| Bleron Kurtishi | 03 | Gostivari, North Macedonia | 17 | "When You Say You Love Me" | | | | |
| Dorian Tafa | 04 | Mamurras | 18 | "Only Human" | | | | |
| Emiliano Brushtulli | 05 | Shkodër | 35 | "It's Probably Me" | | | | |
| Ervis Saliasi | 06 | Berat | 18 | "No Boundaries" | | | | |
| Glenis Duma | 07 | Shkodër | 19 | "Be My Baby" | ✔ | | | |
| Hektor Kollonata | 08 | Korçë | 23 | "Me ty" | ✔ | | ✔ | |
| Jona Xhemalaj | 09 | N/A | N/A | "Sweet Dreams" | | | | |
| Aslaidon Zaimaj | 10 | Durrës | 21 | "Show Me How to Live" | ✔ | ✔ | ✔ | ✔ |
| Kristiana Bako | 11 | Fier | 18 | "Unfaithful" | | | | |
| Mërgime Krasniqi | 12 | Prizren | 23 | "Come Home" | ✔ | | | |
| Mevlud Rahimaj | 13 | Gjilan | 16 | "Colder Weather" | | ✔ | | ✔ |
| Ranja Panajoti | 14 | Tirana | 17 | "Halo" | | | | ✔ |
| Sabina Jakupi | 15 | Tetovo, North Macedonia | 17 | "N/A" | | | | |
| Santiliana Tasuni | 16 | Durrës | 23 | "Girl on Fire" | | | | |
| Vilma Çekani | 17 | Tirana | 20 | "Safe and Sound" | | | | |
| Xhejni Memlikaj | 18 | Fier | 18 | "Love on Top" | | | ✔ | ✔ |

== Battle rounds ==
The Battles or battle rounds (Albanian: Betejats) are where each coach is allowed two saves – they may hit their button as many times as they like but may only steal two artists. The first episode aired on 25 October, the second on 8 November, and the third on 15 November 2014

Colour key

| ✔ | Coach hit his/her "I WANT YOU" button |
| | Artist won the Battle and advanced to the Knockouts |
| | Artist lost the Battle but was stolen by another coach and advances to the Knockouts |
| | Artist lost the Battle and was eliminated |

=== Episode 1 (25 October) ===
| Order | Coach | Artists | | Song | Coaches' and artists choices | | | |
| Order | Coach | Artists | | Song | Sidrit | Alma | Genc | Elsa |
|---|---|---|---|---|---|---|---|---|
| 1 | Sidrit | Romima Shyle | Mevlud Rahimaj | "Say Something" | | | | |
| 2 | Alma | Stenald Mehilli | Brian Shkodrani | "Water Runs Dry" | | | | |
| 3 | Elsa | Erinda Kananaj | Venera Pulaj | "Son of a Preacher Man" | | | | |
| 4 | Elsa | Andi Stafuka | Andi Skerja | "Hero" | | | | |
| 5 | Genc | Aslaidon Zaimaj | Klajdi Koçllari | "Life is Beautiful" | | | | |
| 6 | Alma | Arbi Pelushaj | Kejsi Verçani | "Don't You Worry Child" | | | | ✔ |
| 7 | Genc | Zhorzheta Sota | Rexhina Doci | "It's Oh So Quiet" | | | | |

=== Episode 2 (1 November) ===
| Order | Coach | Artists | | Song | Coaches' and artists choices | | | |
| Order | Coach | Artists | | Song | Sidrit | Alma | Genc | Elsa |
|---|---|---|---|---|---|---|---|---|
| 1 | Genc | Andra Zhjeqi | Frenkli Viero | "Love Is A Losing Game" | | ✔ | | |
| 2 | Alma | Aldo Simoni | Ergi Lami | "Rude" | | | | |
| 3 | Elsa | Armand Pistolja | Gezim Xhaxhaj | "November Rain" | | | | |
| 4 | Sidrit | Genti Sheholli | Rinor Sopjani | | | | | |
