= La notte dei serpenti (festival) =

Annual summer folk music festival in Abruzzo, Italy

- Genre: Folk
- Dates: July
- Locations: Pescara, Italy
- Coordinates: 42°27′28″N 14°14′05″E
- Years active: 2023–present
- Website: Official

La notte dei serpenti is a concert, hosted and created by Enrico Melozzi, together with Monica Giandotti and Andrea Delogu which consists of a modern reinterpretation of Abruzzo folk songs, is sponsored by the municipality of Pescara and the Abruzzo region and will be broadcast again on TV from 2023 on the RAI – Radiotelevisione italiana networks, and takes place on the Pescara seafront.

The first edition took place in Pescara on July 29, 2023, on the seafront, hosted by Monica Giandotti and Enrico Melozzi. The rerun of the concert, broadcast late at night on Rai 1, achieved an 8.9% viewer share.

The second edition on July 20, 2024, was hosted by Andrea Delogu and Enrico Melozzi. The rerun, broadcast on August 23, 2024, in prime time on Rai 2, achieved an 8.8% share.

The third season on July 20, 2025, maintained the same hosting as the previous year, and the rerun broadcast on Rai 2 in prime time on September 9, 2025, achieved a 5.9% share.

The fourth season on July 25, 2026, was hosted by Elettra Lamborghini and Enrico Melozzi.
