= Elsa Lila =

Albanian singer (born 1981)

- Born: 4 July 1981 (age 45); Tirana, PSR Albania
- Genres: Muzika e lehtë shqiptare; Baroque
- Occupations: Singer; songwriter; author; actress
- Instrument: Vocals
- Years active: 1996 – present

Elsa Lila (Albanian pronunciation: [ˈɛlsa ˈlila]; born 4 July 1981) is an Albanian singer and actress. Starting in her teenage years, Lila has frequently competed and won several editions of the Albanian national song contest, Festivali i Këngës. She has represented Albania in music festivals in Italy, Bulgaria, and Kazakhstan. Throughout her career, she has released three studio albums.

Lila has been a judge on the fourth season of The Voice of Albania, and a longtime guest on the first season of Ferma VIP.

== Life and career ==
Elsa Lila was born on 4 July 1981 in Tirana, Albania. She also descends from Vlorë. Her father is a retired tenor who was part of the former Albanian state choir, while her mother was a violinist, so both of her parents raised her close to the music and the theatre, giving her a great love for the arts. Lila had shown her singing and acting talents ever since she was a child in Albanian state television shows and won the Albanian national song contest, or Festivali i Këngës, two years in a row while she was in her teenage years. She is also known for originating the role of Satine in the Albanian-language version of the musical Moulin Rouge!. In 2014, Lila was a judge on the fourth season of The Voice of Albania. For 55 days since March 16, 2022, she was arrested by the Italian police in Rome, because of the suspicion of criminal activities with narcotics but then the charges were later dropped.

In 1996, at the age of 15, Lila first won Festivali i Këngës with "Pyes lotin", and also won the Albanian Public Award through televoting. In 1997, she repeated herself with "Larg urrejtjes". In 1998, she was noticed by all of Europe when she won Albania the Varna International Song Contest in Bulgaria, where 14 other countries participated. Within that year, she then also took home a silver prize in the Voice of Asia singing competition held in Almaty, Kazakhstan. Moreover, she represented her country in Lisboa Expo 98 in Portugal, holding a concert. In 1999, at only 18 years old, Lila was elected "Albanian Singer of the Century" by a national poll of the Albanian state radio television. In the same year, Lila won the debut edition of Kenga Magjike with "Vetëm një fjalë". In 2001, she was awarded "Ambassador of the Albanian Music in the World" by Rexhep Mejdani, President of the Republic of Albania. Her first Sanremo participation was in the Sanremo Music Festival 2003 with the song "Valeria", placing 8th in the Newcomers section. She was also recognized in the United States when she modeled for various magazine covers in New York City and sang at the Avery Fisher Hall to the American State Secretary in 2005. In China, she sang the jingle for a popular television program, CCTV, while she was a guest. She took part at the Sanremo Music Festival 2007 with the song "Il senso della vita", reaching the finals. In December 2007, Lila hosted the 46th Festivali i Këngës with Pirro Çako, as well as the 47th Festivali i Këngës a year later in 2008 where she sang a song with Enrico Ruggeri, and it became part of the soundtrack of the movie by director Gjergj Xhuvani.

=== 2022–present: Comeback and continued success ===
In October 2022, the Albanian national broadcaster, Radio Televizioni Shqiptar (RTSH), reported that Lila was one of 26 artists shortlisted to compete in the 61st edition of Festivali i Këngës with the song "Evita", dedicated to her daughter. She emerged victorious, but this time only managed to win the jury vote, and thus could not represent Albania in the Eurovision Song Contest 2023, as Albina & Familja Kelmendi won a separate public vote.

One of the notable collaborations with Italian conductor Enrico Melozzi after "Evita", was when Lila presented four rearranged songs at his "Un rave classico" concert, part of the Ravenna Festival on July 15, 2023. Reflecting that setlist, she has been experimenting with Albanian folk songs in recent years, as well as Baroque music, or music within the 17th-18th centuries, using her "natural voice" — she sings in lower, contemporary keys, with the intention of making Baroque music more accessible to the public (as demonstrated by Lila having sung the Stabat Mater (Pergolesi) and selected Vivaldi vocal compositions). In particular "experimented" rearrangements, lyrics inspired by Albanian poetry have also been used, such as when Lasgush Poradeci's "Dremit liqeri" was adapted to the Adagio movement of Piano Concerto No. 23 (Mozart) or when Fan Noli's "Anës lumenjve" was adapted to Henry Purcell's What Power Art Thou, Who from Below", known as "The Cold Song" for short, from King Arthur (opera). She participated in the Classical Rave Party, featuring many past collaborating artists of Orchestra Notturna Clandestina on November 15, 2026.

On November 1, 2023, Lila returned to the Palace of Congresses to hold a recital concert called Finalmente Elsa, showcasing her material from over two decades.

In December 2023, she again competed in Festivali i Këngës 62 with the song "Mars", marking the only instance she has lost in the festival.

From March to May 2024, as a lover of animals and plants, Lila spent 9 weeks as an infiltrator on the first Albanian edition of "The Farm", Ferma VIP. During this time period, Pirro Çako and Enis Mullaj also gave her a new song to premiere in a concert she artistically directed inside the farm, called "Vibracionet".

In November 13-17, 2024, she presented the autobiographical book "Mirë se erdhe në Rebibbia" at the 27th Tirana Book Fair, narrating her experiences and the strength that she found during the time she was jailed, revealed as located in a Rebibbian prison within Rome. She released videobooks per chapter in 2026.

For December 2024, Lila released a 9-song New Year's and Christmas album called "Ja na erdhi Viti i Ri", named after the Albanian traditional song that she also presented her own version of. Lila had pointed out the lack of festive songs in the Albanian language. The rest of the songs were adapted from popular American or English Christmas songs from the 30's-70's such as "Happy Xmas (War Is Over)" (Ja erdhi Krishtlindja), "It's Beginning to Look a Lot Like Christmas" (Viti i Ri sapo ka trokitur), and "Have Yourself a Merry Little Christmas" (Medalioni). A piano-and-voice concert was also held on the 27th to premiere the songs live.

Lila has been a judge of Albania's Got Talent since the third episode of Season 2. She released a new song in French, entitled "Une semaine" in August 2026. She performed Albanian folk and cinematic music during her concert at the National Theatre of Opera and Ballet of Albania on November 7, 2026.

== Discography ==
=== Albums ===
List of studio albums
Title	Details
Elsa	Released: 3 March 2003; Label: Sony; Formats: CD, Digital download, streaming
From Mozart to the Balkans: (with Enrico Melozzi and Orchestra Notturna Clandestina)	Released: 1 December 2021
Ja na erdhi Viti i Ri	Released: 27 December 2024

=== Singles ===
List of singles as lead artist, with selected chart positions
Title	Year	Peak chart positions	Album
Title	Year	ITA	Album
"Pyes lotin"	1996	—	Non-album singles
"Larg urrejtjes"	1997	—	Non-album singles
"Vetëm një fjalë"	1999	—	Non-album singles
"Soli"	2003	—	Elsa
"Le mie ali senza te"	2003	—	Elsa
"Valeria"	2003	47	Elsa
"Via da questo mondo"	2003	—	Elsa
"Mi mancherai"	2003	—	Elsa
"L'amore che ho"	2003	—	Elsa
"La porta del silenzio"	2003	—	Elsa
"Il senso della vita"	2007	9	Non-album singles
"Al posto del cuore"	2007	—	Non-album singles
"After Mozart Piano Concerto No. 23, K. 488"	2021	—	From Mozart to the Balkans
"Qan lulja për lulen"	2021	—	From Mozart to the Balkans
"Hapi sytë e zezë"	2021	—	From Mozart to the Balkans
"Gelido in ogni vena"	2021	—	From Mozart to the Balkans
"Ngadhënjim mbi vdekjen"	2021	—	From Mozart to the Balkans
"Mall për Çamërinë"	2021	—	From Mozart to the Balkans
"Margjelo"	2021	—	From Mozart to the Balkans
"Moj e bukura More"	2021	—	From Mozart to the Balkans
"Evita"	2022	—	Non-album singles
"Mars"	2023	—	Non-album singles
"Vibracionet"	2024	—	Non-album singles
"Ja erdhi Krishtlindja"	2024	—	Ja na erdhi Viti i Ri (Note: Each song was released one-by-one within December 17-27, 2024.)
"Medalioni"	2024	—	Ja na erdhi Viti i Ri
"Gëzuar shpirt Vitin e Ri"	2024	—	Ja na erdhi Viti i Ri
"Ne të dy po festojmë në Tiranë"	2024	—	Ja na erdhi Viti i Ri
"Ja na erdhi Viti i Ri"	2024	—	Ja na erdhi Viti i Ri
"Sot Krishtlindjen festojmë"	2024	—	Ja na erdhi Viti i Ri
"Kaluan ditët në kalendar"	2024	—	Ja na erdhi Viti i Ri
"Këtë vit do të festoj në Tiranë"	2024	—	Ja na erdhi Viti i Ri
"Viti i Ri sapo ka trokitur"	2024	—	Ja na erdhi Viti i Ri
"—" denotes a recording that did not chart or was not released in that territory.

=== Featurings ===
Year	Song Title	Other Featured Artists
2007	Diferenca je ti	Pirro Çako
2007	Për një kafe në Tiranë	Pirro Çako
2008	Fluturimi i fundit (Volata finale)	Enrico Ruggeri
2024	Fluturimi i fundit	Renis Gjoka
2025	Vibracionet	Aleksandër Gjoka

== Books ==
Year	Title	Language	Type
2024	Mirë se erdhe në Rebibbia	Albanian	Autobiography

Awards and achievements
Preceded by	Kënga Magjike; 2000	Succeeded by Irma and Eranda Libohova with "Një mijë ëndrra"
Preceded by Ardit Gjebrea with "Eja"	Festivali i Këngës; 1996 and 1997	Succeeded by Albërie Hadërgjonaj with "Mirësia dhe e vërteta"
Preceded by Ronela Hajati with "Sekret"	Festivali i Këngës; 2022	Succeeded by Mal Retkoceri with "Çmendur"
