= Enrico Melozzi =

Italian composer, arranger, musician and record producer

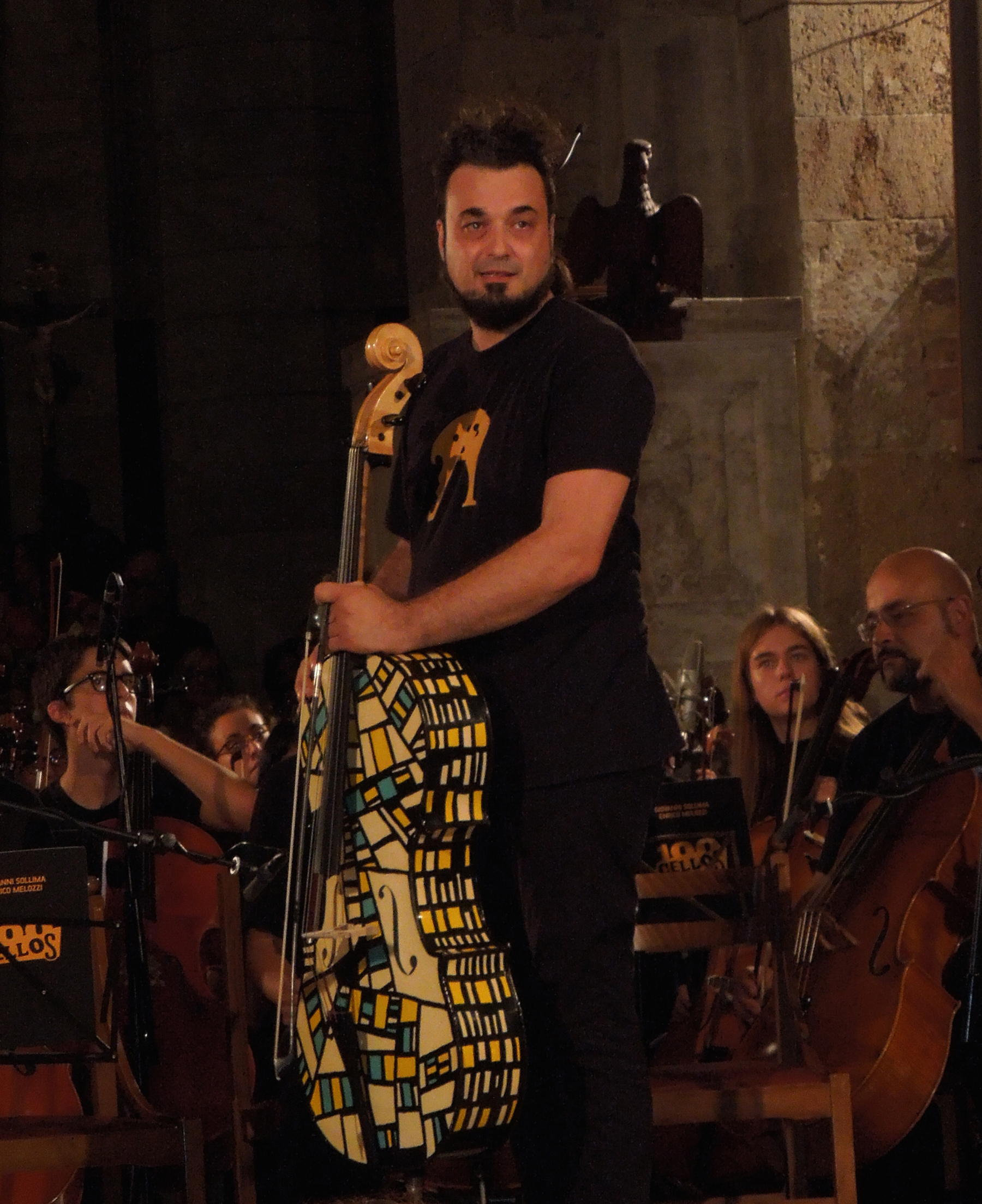
- Melozzi in 2018
- Born: 22 June 1977 (age 49); Teramo, Italy
- Occupation: Composer

Enrico Melozzi (born 22 June 1977), also known as Melox, is an Italian conductor, composer, arranger, cellist, and record producer.

== Life and career ==
Born in Teramo, as a child Melozzi learned to play the piano by himself and at the age of eight he composed his first pieces. After his diploma in cello, he graduated in composition at the London College of Music. In 1999 he started to work as an assistant to Michael Riessler and made his debut as a conductor in 2002 at the Parco della Musica in Rome.

Melozzi's collaborations include Måneskin, Ana Mena, Giusy Ferreri, Pinguini Tattici Nucleari, Noemi, Achille Lauro, Rocco Hunt, Gianluca Grignani, Niccolò Fabi and Elsa Lila. He is a member of the electronic music duo Lisma Project together with DJ Stefano De Angelis and has also composed operas, chambre music, and musical scores for films and ballets. He is the founder of the record label Cinik Records and in 2012 he co-founded with Giovanni Sollima the ensemble 100 Cellos and the Orchestra Notturna Clandestina.

Enrico Melozzi in 2023 hosted and created la notte dei serpenti concert which consists of a modern reinterpretation of Abruzzo folk songs, is sponsored by the municipality of Pescara and the Abruzzo region
