= Kastro Zizo =

Albanian singer-songwriter (born 1984)

- Born: 21 May 1984 (age 42); Lushnjë, Albania
- Genres: Rock, Hip hop, Pop-folk
- Occupations: Singer; songwriter; actor
- Instruments: Vocals, guitar

Klevis Bega (born 21 May 1984), known professionally as Kastro Zizo, is an Albanian singer-songwriter, actor and television host. He made his film debut as protagonist Branko in Pharmakon, the Albanian entry for the Best Foreign Language Oscar at the 85th Academy Awards, which did not make the final shortlist.

== Career ==
Bega rose to prominence with the songs Maca, Grl Zrbcnk, Pa faj, Dite dites, Silazhi, Kokashta, Papalove and Wawaz. He is best known for his eclectic approach to music, writing socially conscious lyrics with a satiric flare incorporated in a lyrical melody, combined with his tenor vocal range. He began performing in 2000, and became prominent initially with the song Silazhi.

Credited as Klevis Bega, he made his official film debut in the Albanian drama Pharmakon, as protagonist Branko. The role drew critical attention, and he was cast in various other projects since 2012, including Artan, Pa fan, Black Man and Amnesity.

Zizo is active in Albanian media as a television presenter as well. Bega frequently appears in the show Zone e lire, since 2012, Top Show Albania, since 2010, and since 2015 Thurje, where he discusses current international events and events in Albania. In Thurje recurring topics remain astrophysics and philosophy, two themes that interest Bega. In 2016 he had competed in the Albanian version of Your Face Sounds Familiar where he completed many imitations, such as Conchita Wurst, Lucio Dalla, Azis, Elita 5 and many others. He returned in 2022 with the song Mall Burri.

In 2023, he was selected to compete in the Festivali i Këngës 62 with the song "2073".

== Personal life ==
Zizo resides in Tirana with his wife Era and two children, Dankan (born 2005) and Nia (born 2009). His son, Dankan, is the central subject of his 2014 release Papalove, in which Bega expresses his fatherly love to him. In 2020 he announced the birth of his third child, a boy named Dante.
