= Adelina Ismaili =

Albanian from Kosova singer-songwriter

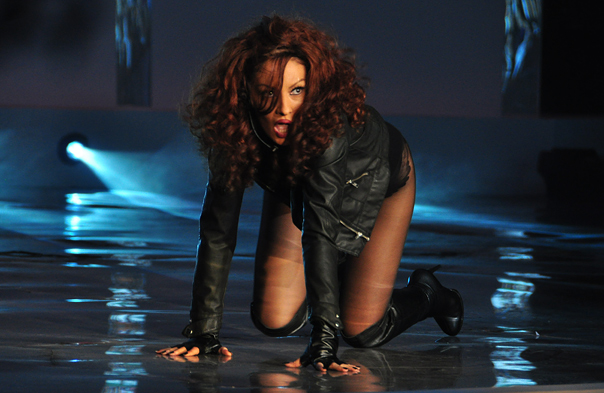
- Adelina Ismaili during a performance
- Born: 14 December 1979 (age 46); Pristina, SAP Kosovo (present-day Kosovo)
- Occupations: Singer, songwriter, actress
- Years active: 1980s–present
- Notable work: 100% Zeshkane; S'jam sex bombë Prej fillimit Mbretëreshë e Robëreshë
- Musical career
- Genres: Folk; Balkan pop
- Label: Iliada Entertainment

Adelina Ismaili (Albanian pronunciation: [adɛˈlina iˈsmajli]; born 14 December 1979) is a Kosovar singer, actress, and beauty pageant winner. She predominantly sings in Albanian.

== Career ==
Ismaili started singing at a very young age, becoming one of Kosovo's most influential singers during the 90s. She started competing in various children's festivals in the Albanian territories, such as the Akordet e Kosovës, Festivali i këngës për fëmijë në RTSH and many others. During her teenage years, Adelina released many songs that spoke about children's rights and the lives of teenagers. She was one of the first singers in Kosovo who touched topics that others of her age couldn't.

After taking a short break, Adelina released other songs that created a whole new era in the Albanian music industry, bringing new styles of dressing and singing on stage, which had never been seen before. She is also highly recognised as a sex symbol for her provocative videos and performances on Albanian local television stations. Her songs that brought much attention were: "Amaneti", "Qe 1 vjet e 7 ditë", and "Shota". She sang many songs dedicated to the victims of the Kosovo War, for instance "Lavdi ushtarit tim" (Honor to My Soldier). Adelina was crowned Miss Kosovo in 1997.

== Discography ==
Ismaili's records, including four chart-topping albums (100% zeshkane, S'jam sex bombë, Prej fillimit and Mbretëreshë e robëreshë) were instant successes and became best sellers in Albania, in the Albanian-speaking regions of the former Yugoslavia, and in the Albanian diaspora.

=== Albums ===
- 100% Zeshkane (1996)
- S'jam Sex Bombë (2000)
- Prej fillimit (2002)
- Mbretëreshë e Robëreshë (2005)
- Feniks (2007)

=== Singles ===
- Shko (1996)
- Me Motor (1996)
- 100% Zeshkane (1996)
- Po nanës tënde çka i bana (1996)
- Ushtrinë time do ta bëj (1996)
- Sajzeza (feat. Elita 5, 1996)
- Shko në R.S (1998)
- Lavdi ushtari im (1998)
- Uragan çohen krenarët (1999)
- Martesa (1999)
- Sonte (2000)
- Amaneti (2000)
- You are my Angel (2000)
- Fuck the Government (2000)
- Largohu nga frajeri im (2000)
- Sex Bombë (2000)
- Unë duhet (2001
- Qe 1 vjet e 7 ditë (2001)
- Çka të bëj (2001)
- Mos ma ndal (2002)
- Dil e shih moj bijë (2002)
- Skënderbe (2003)
- Në Kosovë luhet kumorë (feat. Tingulli 3nt, 2003)
- Dy motra, një frajer (feat. Zanfina Ismaili, 2005)
- Mirëdita (2006)
- Diva (2007)
- Trimit tim (2008)
- Tribalb (2009)
- Urdhër i ri (2010)
- Love you more (feat. Faudel, 2011)
- Ku ma ke (2012)
- Karma (2014)
- T'Iqja (2018)
