= Elita 5 =

Albanian rock band

- Origin: Tetovo, North Macedonia
- Genres: arena rock, hard rock, heavy metal
- Years active: 1988–present
- Label: Prominent Network
- Members: Mevaip Mustafi; Besim Ibraimi; Arif Ziberi; Agron Idrizi; Nexhat Mujovi; Valon Gashi

Elita 5 is an Albanian rock band from Tetovo, North Macedonia. The band’s lineup consists of: Arif Ziberi (lead vocals), Nexhat "Wirusi" Mujovi (keyboards), Valon Gashi (lead guitar), Agron Idrizi (bass guitar), Besim Ibraimi (drums), and Mevaip Mustafi (rhythm guitar). They are one of the most popular and successful Albanian rock bands of all time.

== Career ==
The band formed in 1988 in the town of Tetovo, SR Macedonia, although their first recording was published as an album titled Elita 5 in 1990.

They have repeatedly refused to play in competitive festivals stating that "the band does not belong in festivals", preferring concerts instead.

In a 2001 concert, the band had opened in Tirana, Albania for the German heavy metal band Scorpions, the vocalist Arif Ziberi in an interview noted that this was one of the most exciting moments in his life.

In 2008, the band organised a humanitarian concert in Tetovo, Macedonia for the victims of the 2008 Gërdec explosions.

They take part in many concerts and are annually invited to close the Beer fest in the city of Korçë, Albania.

== Members ==
- Mevaip Mustafi (guitar)
- Besim Ibraimi (drums)
- Arif Ziberi (vocals)
- Agron Idrizi (bass guitar)
- Nexhat Mujovi - Wirusi (keyboards).
- Valon Gashi (lead guitar)

== Discography ==
=== Albums ===
- Elita 5 (1990)
- Nuk jam Al Kapone (1992)
- Fol, vetëm fol (1994)
- Si Merlin Monro (1997)
- Hitet e Elita 5 (1998)
- Only for You (Vetem per ju) (2000)
- Elita 5 Live (2000) (LP)
- Bardh e zi (2004)
- The Best Of Elita 5 (2005)
- Çmendem (2007)
- Mohikani I Fundit (2014)

== Awards and nominations ==
Netet e Klipit Shqiptar

Year	Nominee / work	Award	Result
2012	"Nuk jam une diktator"	Jury Prize	Won
2013	"Degjo"	Best Rock Video	Won
2015	"Me fal"	Best Director	Won

Video Fest Awards

Year	Nominee / work	Award	Result
2005	"Faleminderit"	Best Promotion Video	Won
2005	"Faleminderit"	Best Rock Video	Nominated

Zhurma Show Awards

Year	Nominee / work	Award	Result
2005	"Faleminderit"	Best Rock	Won
2005	"Faleminderit"	Best Editing	Won
2005	"Faleminderit"	Top List	Won
2005	"Faleminderit"	Best Video/First Prize	Nominated
2005	"Faleminderit"	Best Album	Nominated
2012	"Degjo"	Best Rock	Won
2014	"Me fal"	Best Video/First Prize	Won
2014	"Me fal"	Best Rock	Won
2014	"Mohikani i fundit "	Best Album	Won
