= Palace of Congresses =

Music venue in Albania

- Pallati i Kongreseve
- Palace of Concerts
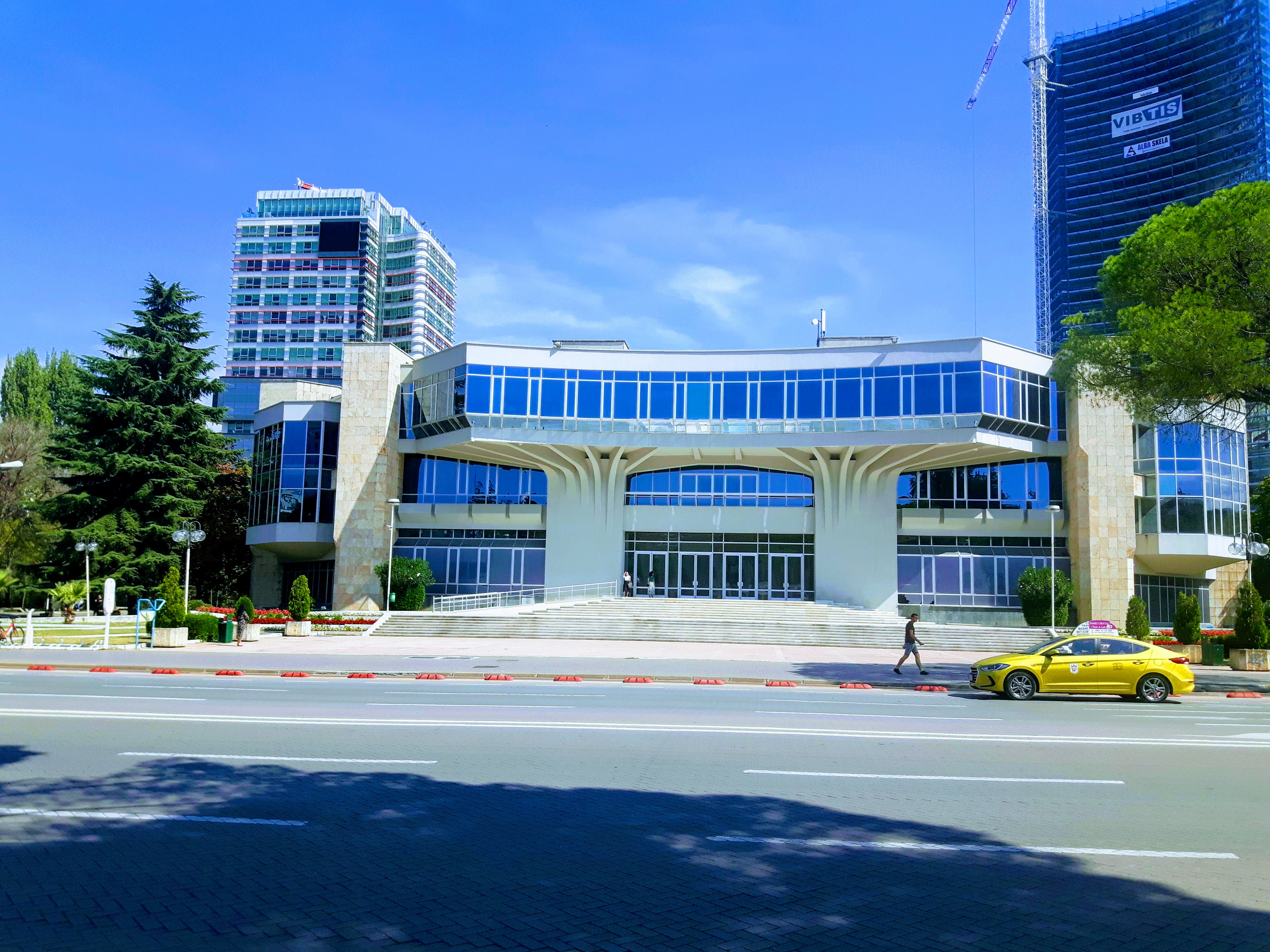
- Interactive map of Palace of Congresses
- Address: Dëshmorët e Kombit Boulevard; Tirana; Albania
- Coordinates: 41°19′9″N 19°49′19″E
- Capacity: 2,100
- Current use: Various

Construction
- Opened: 1986

The Palace of Congresses (Albanian: Pallati i Kongreseve) is a venue in Tirana, Albania, where numerous multi-genre concerts, exhibition, festivals, competitions and other events are held, including the annual Festivali i Këngës and Kënga Magjike and the Tirana Book Fair.

It was built during the late communist era to host the Congresses of the Party of Labour of Albania and other official activities. Today, the palace is used as a venue for conferences, festivals, exhibitions, ceremonies, concerts and more. It currently has a capacity of 2,100 seats.

There are three other smaller halls, with a smaller capacity of 150, 280 and 300 people, designed as working environments for different meetings and occasions.
