= Agron Llakaj =

Albanian comedian (born 1960)

- Born: 24 April 1960 (age 66); Memaliaj, Albania
- Education: Academy of Arts of Albania, Tiranë
- Spouse: Kostandina Llakaj (died 2024)

Comedy career
- Years active: 1978–present

Agron Novruz Llakaj (born 24 April 1960) is an Albanian comedian, producer and television presenter, known for presenting Portokalli, Al Pazar and PaPare Night.

== Early life and education ==
Agron Llakaj was born in the city of Memaliaj in the district of Tepelene, on April 24, 1960. He completed his higher studies at the Tirana Academy of Arts, in the years 1987–1991.

== Career ==
His artistic beginnings were in the house of culture Memaliaj from 1978 to 1987, as a singer and parodist, later he became known in the genre of imitations, usually imitating news and football commentators as well as many of the well-known names of the screen and humor. Long during this period Agron Llakaj was a special guest at the professional stage of Gjirokastër for 6 months and he was a participant in the television series Bashkë me Ju (Together With You) in which he became known by the general public throughout Albania.

His activities have been intense as a special guest in the programs "12 in Hollywood", "12 dances without a Saturday" and "12 weeks around fate", etc.

He is famous for imitating political characters such as Sali Berisha, Alfred Moisiu, Rexhep Mejdani, Spartak Ngjela etc. Llakaj has been present in the broadcasts of television shows such as Telebingo during 1996–2003. In December 1998, he co-directed the movie Titaniku on TV Klan.

From 2003 to 2010, he was the artistic director, moderator and actor of the comedy show Portokalli. Between 2011 and 2012, he served as the moderator of the Albanian version of Who Wants to Be a Millionaire?. From 2012 to 2019 he was the author, director, screenwriter and actor of the comedy show Al Pazar and since December 2019, the author and moderator of the satirical show Fake Off on Vizion Plus.

Llakaj has a gallery of humorous characters, such as Xha Temja a charismatic LANÇ vet, Aneja an old woman from Tepelena/Gjirokastër, Jorgaq the photographer, Sul the agent, Fiqo, Visho, Patronazhisti, etc.

He is honoured by the president of Albania Bamir Topi with the "Grand Master Order" for his outstanding contribution and high-level performance in creating numerous artistic characters that reflect the Albanian reality.

On May 24, 2024, Lllakaj's wife Kostandina died after a battle with cancer.
