= Chamerian cuisine =

Culinary traditions of Chameria

Chamerian cuisine (Albanian: Kuzhina çame) is the traditional cuisine of the Cham Albanians, originating in the historical region of Chameria, southern Balkans. Forming part of the broader tradition of Albanian cuisine, it combines Balkan culinary elements inherited from the Ottoman cuisine and is characterized by the extensive use of olive oil, fresh herbs, dairy products, wild greens, lamb, homemade breads and baked dishes.

Following the displacement of the Cham Albanian population during and after World War II, many traditional recipes were preserved by Cham communities that settled in Albania, where they continue to be prepared to this day.

== History ==
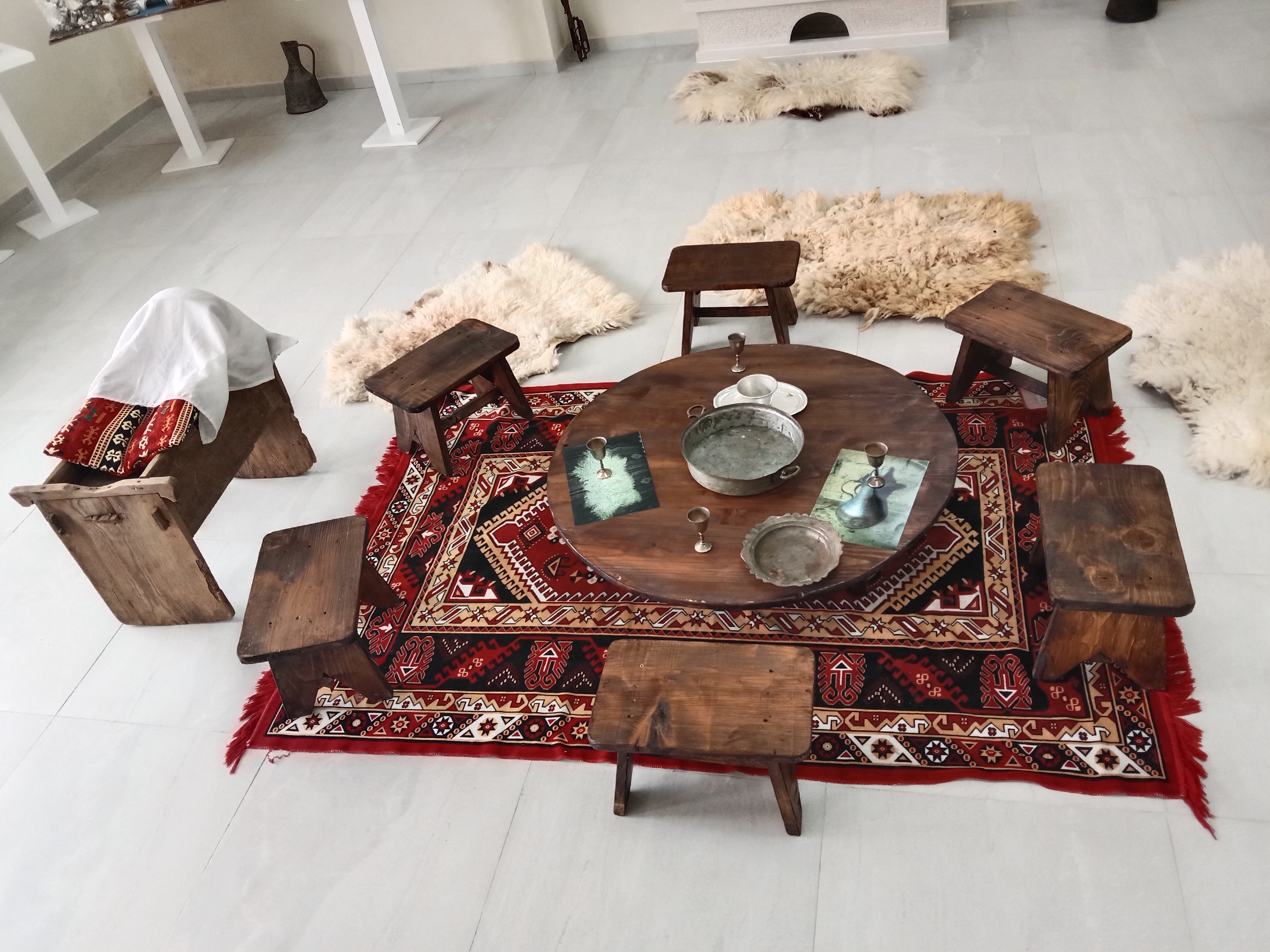
Traditional sofra setting

For centuries, the economy of Cham households was based on agriculture and livestock husbandry. Families cultivated cereals, olives, vineyards and vegetables, while sheep, goats and cattle supplied milk, cheese and meat. Household gardens commonly produced parsley, dill, mint, garlic, spring onions, spinach, chard and lettuce, while a variety of wild edible greens — including sow thistle, dock, wild mustard and poppies — were gathered seasonally and incorporated into everyday cooking.

Cham cuisine emphasized fresh seasonal ingredients, olive oil, dairy products, aromatic herbs and wild greens. Wheat and maize flour, cracked wheat, rice, lamb, poultry and beef also formed important components of the regional diet. Fresh and dried fruit, preserves (gliko) and jams were traditionally served as desserts or accompaniments.

Meals were traditionally served around a large circular sofra (low dining table), reflecting the communal character of Cham family life.

=== Cooking methods ===
Baking occupies a prominent place in Cham culinary tradition. Most households traditionally possessed a wood-fired masonry oven (furrë), which was used to bake bread, pies and meat dishes. The development of the enclosed oven represented an evolution from earlier cooking beneath the saç (metal baking dome), allowing for a wider range of baked recipes.

The ovens were constructed from clay, lime mortar and crushed roof tiles, with domed interiors designed to retain heat efficiently while consuming relatively little firewood.

Traditionally, households stored large quantities of olive oil in underground plastered storage pits known as kapase, from which the oil was drawn using a small metal vessel called garrafa.

== Traditional dishes ==
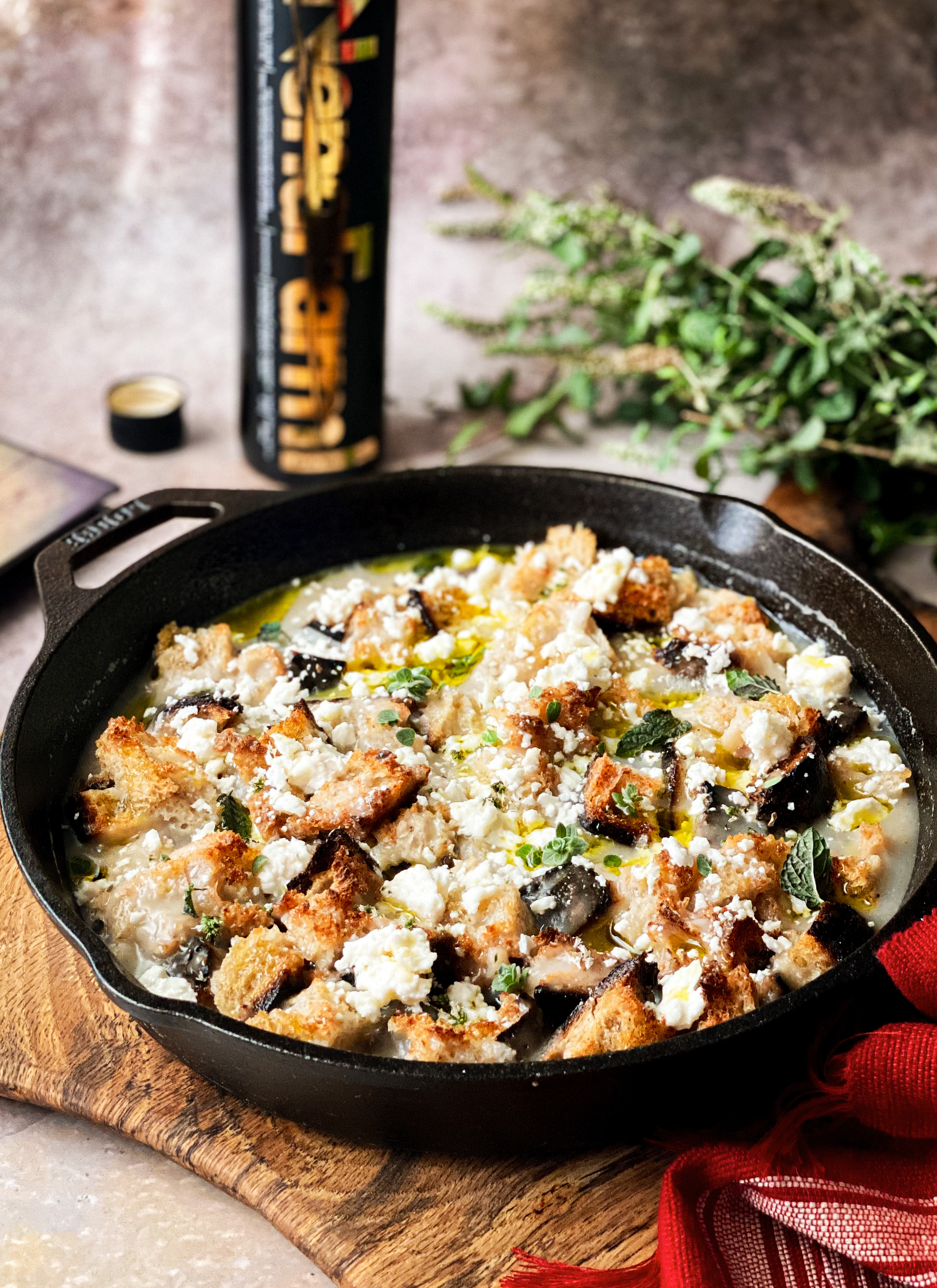
Trahana with cheese, orgenano and olive oil.

Cham cuisine includes a wide variety of soups, baked dishes, meat preparations, pies and dairy-based recipes. Among its best-known dishes are:

- Brushtulla, a baked maize-flour pie prepared with fresh garlic, spring onions and dill, finished with milk and olive oil.
- Bllac, a simpler baked dish made from wild dock, mint, maize flour and milk.
- Shtalpa, baked fresh cheese mixed with eggs and herbs.
- Birjan, a rice dish prepared with meat and aromatic spices.
- Vali paça, a lamb soup thickened with egg and lemon.
- Jahni me plënc, a stew prepared with lamb offal.
- Kukurec, made from seasoned lamb offal wrapped in intestines and roasted.
- Mashkullora, a baked preparation made from the head of a young ram, walnuts, eggs, butter and olive oil.
- Rigonla, a beef stew flavoured with oregano.
- Trahana, often served with fried lamb fat or glands, white cheese and browned butter seasoned with paprika.
- Qofte të rreme, meatless fritters made from bread, eggs and herbs that resemble meatballs.
- Petanik, a layered pie of baked pastry filled with boiled lamb’s head and its broth.
- Qahi, a cheese-filled pastry folded into small parcels.
- Qumështor, a baked dairy pie with several regional variations.

Cham cuisine also shares several dishes with other Albanian regions, including stuffed peppers, stuffed cabbage leaves (dolma), stuffed zucchini, spinach burani, imam bayıldı, eggplant musaka and stuffed vine leaves (japrak).

== Bread and grain products ==
The most common homemade breads consist of wheat and maize, while one distinctive variety is baked on a round wooden board known as qëri. Before baking, the dough is brushed with milk and olive oil, producing a soft interior and lightly browned crust.

Other traditional baked goods include Këmkuqja, a flatbread filled with cheese and olive oil that may also be topped with olives.

Wheat is also used to prepare the following:

- Tumac, handmade noodles similar to the jufka of other Albanian regions.
- Blihur, cracked and dried wheat used in pilafs and qeshqek.
- Dromsa, small handmade pasta known elsewhere in Albania as rosnica, thërrime or drudhëza, served in soups, pilafs or baked casseroles.
- Koropoqe, small dumplings made from wheat and maize flour, often served in a soup with meat broth, yogurt and eggs.

== Dairy products ==
The abundant mountain and lowland pastures of Chameria have traditionally supported a strong dairy-making tradition. Fresh cheeses, aged cheeses, yogurt and butter are staple ingredients.

One distinctive product is cheese matured inside an animal skin (djathë në shakull). Fresh cheese is packed into the skin together with strained yogurt and sheep’s milk, where it develops a unique flavour during maturation.

== Desserts ==
The most popular dessert of Cham cuisine is Cham baklava, distinguished by its considerable height, numerous thin layers of pastry and generous walnut filling. Traditionally, families competed over the quality of their baklava, judging its delicacy by pressing the butt of a rifle into the finished pastry; the baklava that compressed the most without collapsing was considered the finest.

Përvëlata is another syrup-soaked dessert made from a soft dough containing flour, butter, oil, milk, yogurt and walnuts (or almonds), then baked and soaked in a cinnamon-flavored sugar syrup.

Other traditional sweets include: Hallva, Sapunhallva, Samsa (filled with walnuts), Tullumba (also known locally as fuskalidhe), Manurja (a confection made from crushed dried figs shaped into small cakes).

Fresh fruits, including quince and fig along with walnuts have been used to preserve jams and gliko.

== Beverages ==
Traditional beverages include dhallë (a yogurt-based drink), fruit syrups, herbal drinks and raki. Wine was historically produced in parts of Chameria, although viticulture declined during the early twentieth century as many vineyards were replaced by tobacco cultivation. Alcohol consumption generally remained limited among the region’s predominantly Muslim population.
