= Gliko =

Albanian fruit preserve

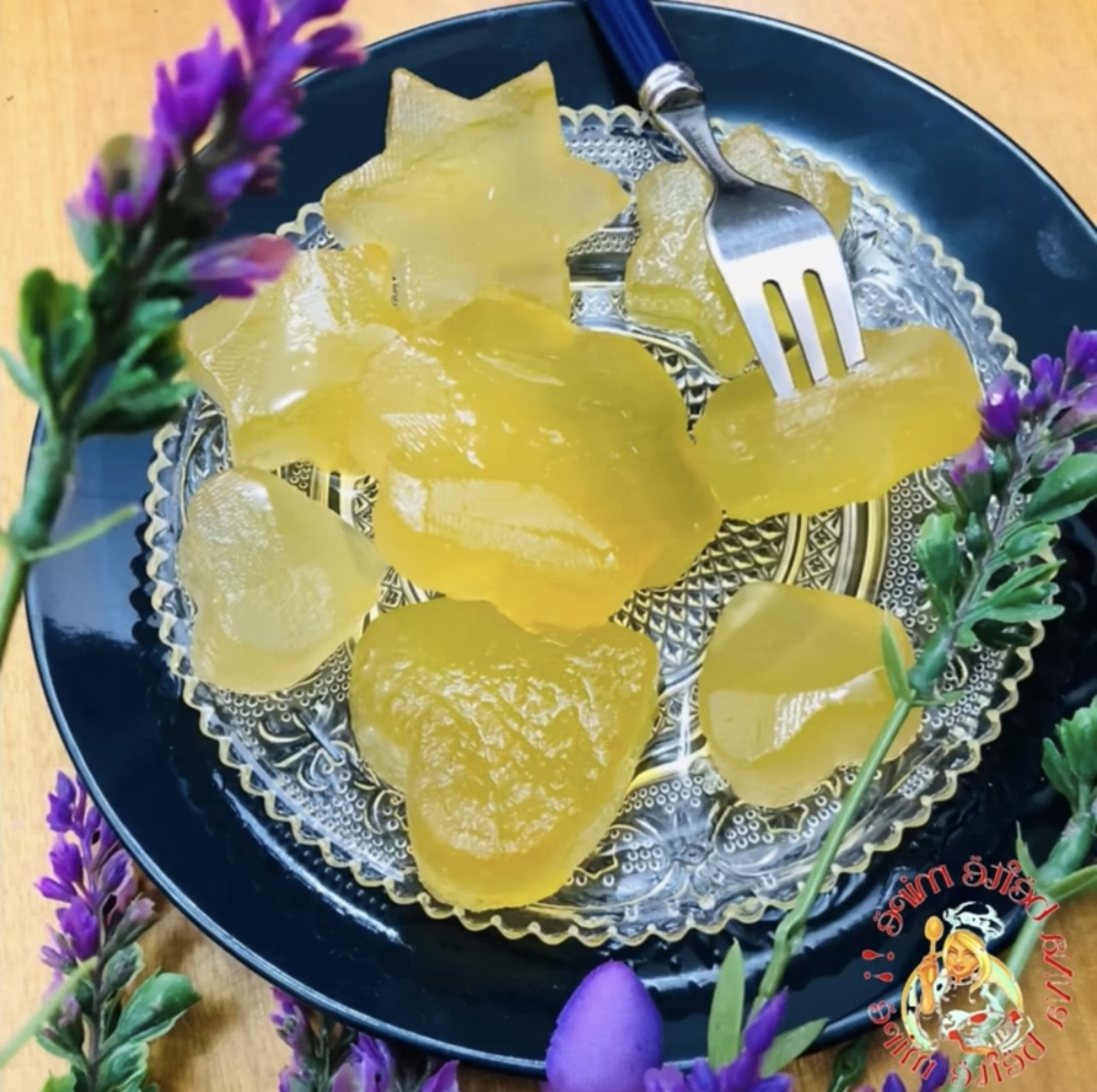
- Watermelon gliko
- Type: Fruit preserve
- Course: Dessert
- Place of origin: Albania
- Region or state: Përmet
- Associated cuisine: Albanian cuisine
- Serving temperature: cold
- Main ingredients: fruits, sugar syrup, lemon
- Variations: green walnut, white cherry, wild fig, plum, apricot, eggplant, tomato, carrot and watermelon

Gliko is a traditional Albanian fruit preserve originating from Përmet, in southern Albania. It is prepared by slowly cooking whole fruits (and occasionally vegetables) in sugar syrup. The preserves are made from fruits and vegetables cultivated in the fertile Vjosa River valley.

A wide variety of gliko is produced but the best known is "green walnut gliko" (Albanian: gliko arre), made from whole unripe walnuts harvested in early June before their shells harden. Other local varieties include white cherry, wild fig, plum, apricot, eggplant, tomato, carrot and watermelon.

== Preparation ==
Carefully selected produce is first soaked in cold water and lime solution to firm the flesh before being rinsed thoroughly. The fruit is then slowly boiled in a sugar syrup, typically in a large copper pot over an open fire, with lemon or citric acid added to preserve its color and improve the flavor.

Once the fruit has fully absorbed the syrup, the preserve is cooled and stored in sealed glass jars.

=== Green walnut gliko ===
Green walnut gliko is considered the most distinctive and labor-intensive variety. It is prepared from whole unripe walnuts harvested during the first half of June, before their shells harden. After harvesting, the walnuts are peeled, pierced and repeatedly boiled, then soaked in fresh water for up to 40 days, with the water changed twice daily to remove their natural bitterness.

Once the soaking process is complete, the walnuts are immersed in lime water to firm their texture before being boiled again and slowly cooked in a concentrated sugar syrup. Traditional recipes use about 25 walnuts for every kilogram of sugar. During cooking, the syrup is skimmed to remove impurities, while cloves, lemon or citric acid and scented geranium leaves are added to enhance the preserve’s flavor and aroma.
