= Albanian cuisine =

Culinary traditions of Albania

Albanian cuisine is a representative of the cuisine of the Mediterranean. It is also an example of the Mediterranean diet based on the importance of olive oil, fruits, vegetables, and fish. The cooking traditions of the Albanian people are diverse in consequence of the environmental factors that are more importantly suitable for the cultivation of nearly every kind of herbs, vegetables, and fruits. Olive oil is the most ancient and commonly used vegetable fat in Albanian cooking, produced since antiquity throughout the country particularly along the coasts.

Hospitality is a fundamental custom of Albanian society and serving food is integral to the hosting of guests and visitors. It is not infrequent for visitors to be invited to eat and drink with locals. The medieval Albanian code of honor, called besa, resolved to look after guests and strangers as an act of recognition and gratitude.

Albanian cuisine can be divided into three major regional cuisines. The cuisine of the northern region has a rural, coastal and mountainous origin. Meat, fish and vegetables are central to the cuisine of the northern region. The people there use many kinds of ingredients that usually grow in the region, including potatoes, carrots, maize, beans, and cabbage, and also cherries, walnuts and almonds. Garlic and onions are as well important components to the local cuisine and added to almost every dish.

The cuisine of the central region is threefold of rural, mountainous and coastal. The central region is the flattest and rich in vegetation and biodiversity as well as culinary specialties. It has Mediterranean characteristics due to its proximity to the sea, which is rich in fish. Dishes here include several meat specialties and desserts of all kinds.

In the south, the cuisine is composed of two components: the rural products of the field including dairy products, citrus fruits and olive oil, and coastal products, i.e. seafood. Those regions are particularly conducive to raising animals, as pastures and feed resources are abundant.

Besides garlic, onions are arguably the country's most widely used ingredient. Albania is ranked fifth in the world in terms of onion consumption per capita.

== History ==
Albanian cuisine is strongly influenced by the country's geography and history, and draws inspiration from the Mediterranean, Ottoman, and Balkan culinary traditions.

=== Illyrian era ===
Albania’s culinary heritage is traced back to the Illyrian era (900 BCE-600 CE), when the diet primarily consisted of grains, legumes, wild herbs, and dairy products. The area's ample arable lands and its Mediterranean climate allowed for the cultivation of wheat, which became a staple in the diet. The Romans brought grapes, olives and staples when they took hold of the area in the 2nd century CE.

=== Byzantine and Ottoman influence ===
Albania's absorption into the Byzantine Empire introduced dishes with typical Mediterranean ingredients, including olive oil, seafood, and a variety of herbs. Following the Ottoman conquest in the 15th century, Albanian cuisine integrated Turkish elements. Dishes such as byrek (savory pie), baklava, and kebabs became staples of the Albanian diet. The use of spices including cinnamon, cloves, and nutmeg, as well as rice-based dishes like pilaf, became prominent during this period.

=== Post World War II ===
After the war, Albanian cuisine began to incorporate staples from its northern neighbor Yugoslavia, especially ajvar, a relish composed of eggplant, roasted red peppers, and various herbs and spices.

The local cuisine underwent significant changes during the 45-year authoritarian Communist rule of Enver Hoxha (1945-1990), during which draconian measures to maintain political control and promote economic self-sufficiency saw the rationing of food supplies, a prohibition of fishing, and a widespread decline in beef and dairy consumption.

The regime attempted to "collectivize" all regional Albanian cuisines and blur localized differences through the promotion of a singular national cuisine that emphasized simplicity and thrift. Since the end of Communist rule, new generations of Albanians have tried to revive traditional cuisine elements and popularize recipes of dishes that were discouraged by the Hoxha regime.

== Characteristics and meals ==
Albania's location in the western Balkan Peninsula and on the Mediterranean Sea has impactfully contributed to the local cuisine. Many foods that are common in the Mediterranean Basin, such as olives, wheat, chickpeas, dairy products, fish, fruits, and vegetables, are prominent in the Albanian cooking tradition. Albania has a distinctly Mediterranean climate. Across the country, a range of microclimates due to differing soil types and topography allows a variety of products to be grown. Citrus fruits such as oranges, lemons, figs and olives thrive.

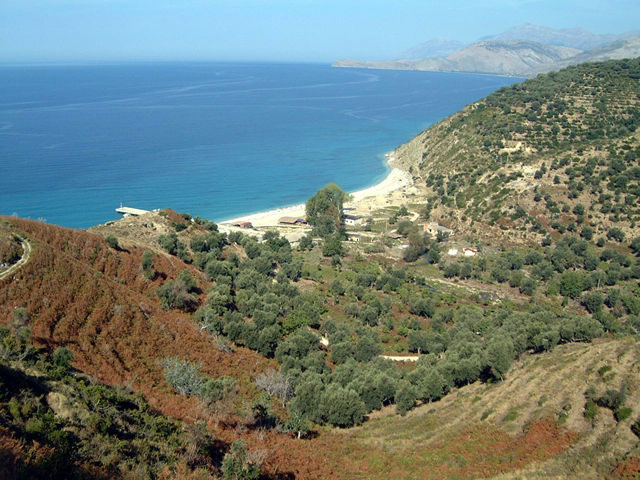
Citrus fruits are mostly cultivated in the south of Albania.

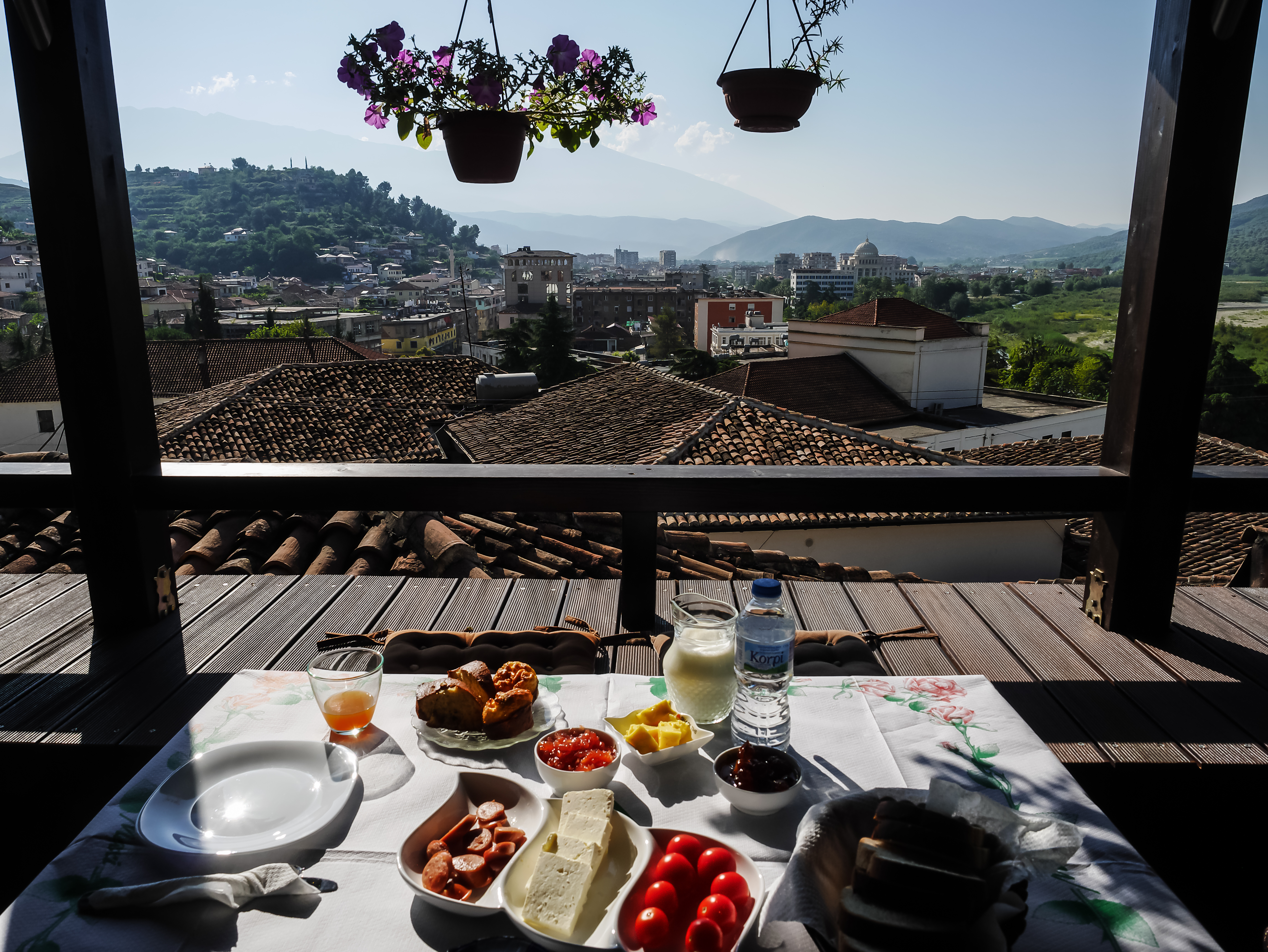
Breakfast in Albania

Every region has its own typical breakfast. Breakfast is generally light. Bread is common, served with butter, cheese, jam and yogurt, and accompanied with olives, coffee, milk, tea or raki. Tarhana (tarhana), a soup composed of wheat and fermented milk, is also a common breakfast in many rural areas. It is common to have only fruit or a slice of bread and a cup of coffee or tea for breakfast. Coffee and tea are enjoyed both in homes and in cafés.

Lunch is traditionally the biggest meal of the day, for everyone from school children to shop workers and government officials. In the past, people went home to have lunch with their families, but it is now common to have lunch with friends at restaurants or cafeterias. Lunch sometimes consists of gjellë, a main dish of slowly cooked meat with various vegetables, accompanied by a salad of fresh vegetables, such as tomatoes, cucumbers, green peppers, onions and olives. Salads are typically served with meat dishes and are dressed with salt, olive oil, white vinegar or lemon juice. Grilled or fried vegetables and sausages and various forms of omelettes are also eaten. Common beverages are coffee, tea, fruit juices and milk.

Supper in Albania is a smaller meal, often consisting only of a variety of breads, meat, fresh fish or seafood, cheese, eggs and various kinds of vegetables, similar to breakfast, and sandwiches.

== Ingredients ==
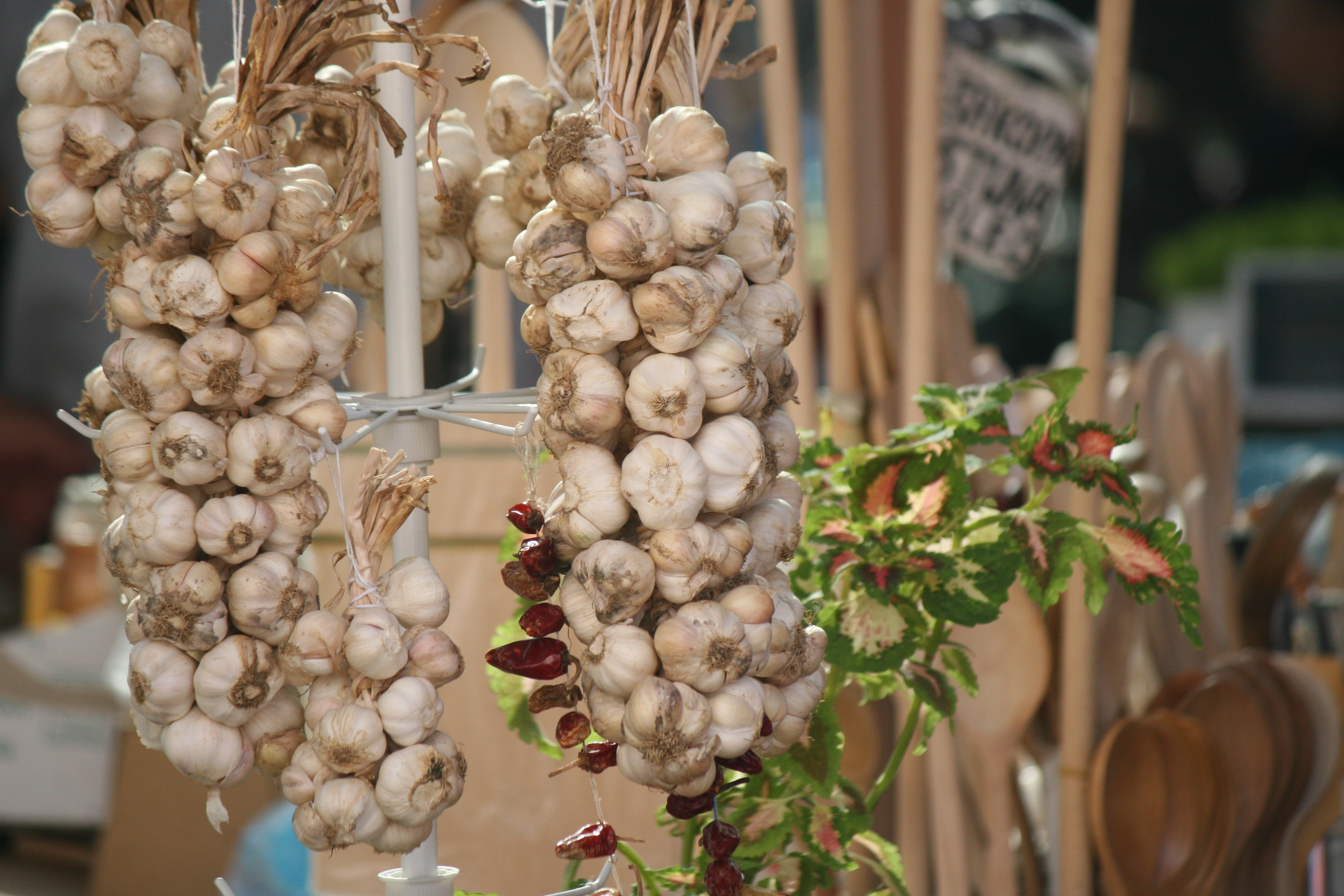
Garlic is popular throughout the country.

Located in Southern Europe with a direct proximity to the Mediterranean Sea, the Albanian cuisine features a wide range of fresh fruits, growing naturally in the fertile Albanian soil and under the warm sun. In consideration of being an agricultural country, Albania is a significant fruit importer and exporter. Besides citrus fruits, cherries, strawberries, blueberries and raspberries are among the most cultivated fruits. Many Albanians keep fruit trees in their yards. Fresh and dried fruits are eaten as snacks and desserts.

Fruits that are traditionally associated with Albanian cuisine include apple, grape, olive, orange, nectarine, blackberry, cherry, persimmon, pomegranate, figs, watermelon, avocado, lemon, peach, plum, strawberries, raspberry, mulberry and cornelian cherry.

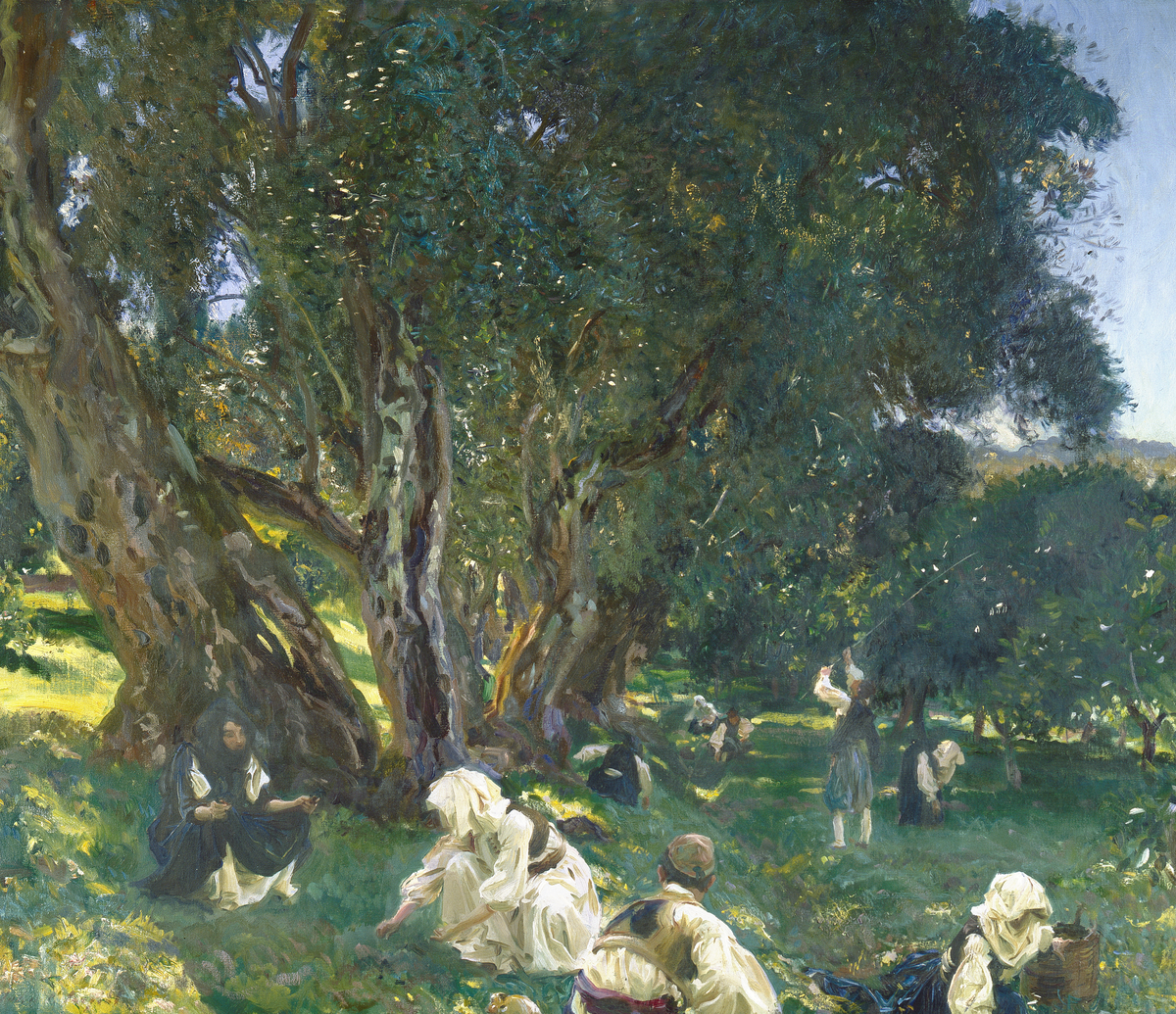
Albanian Olive Gatherers by American artist John Singer Sargent, 1909

A wide variety of vegetables are frequently used in Albanian cooking. Due to the different climate and soil conditions across Albania, cultivars of cabbages, turnips, beetroots, beans, potatoes, leeks and mushrooms can be found in a rich variety. Dried or pickled vegetables are also processed, especially in drier or colder regions such as in the remote Albanian Alps, where fresh vegetables were hard to get out of season. Particularly used vegetables include onion, garlic, tomato, cucumber, carrot, pepper, spinach, lettuce, grape leaves, bean, eggplant and zucchini.

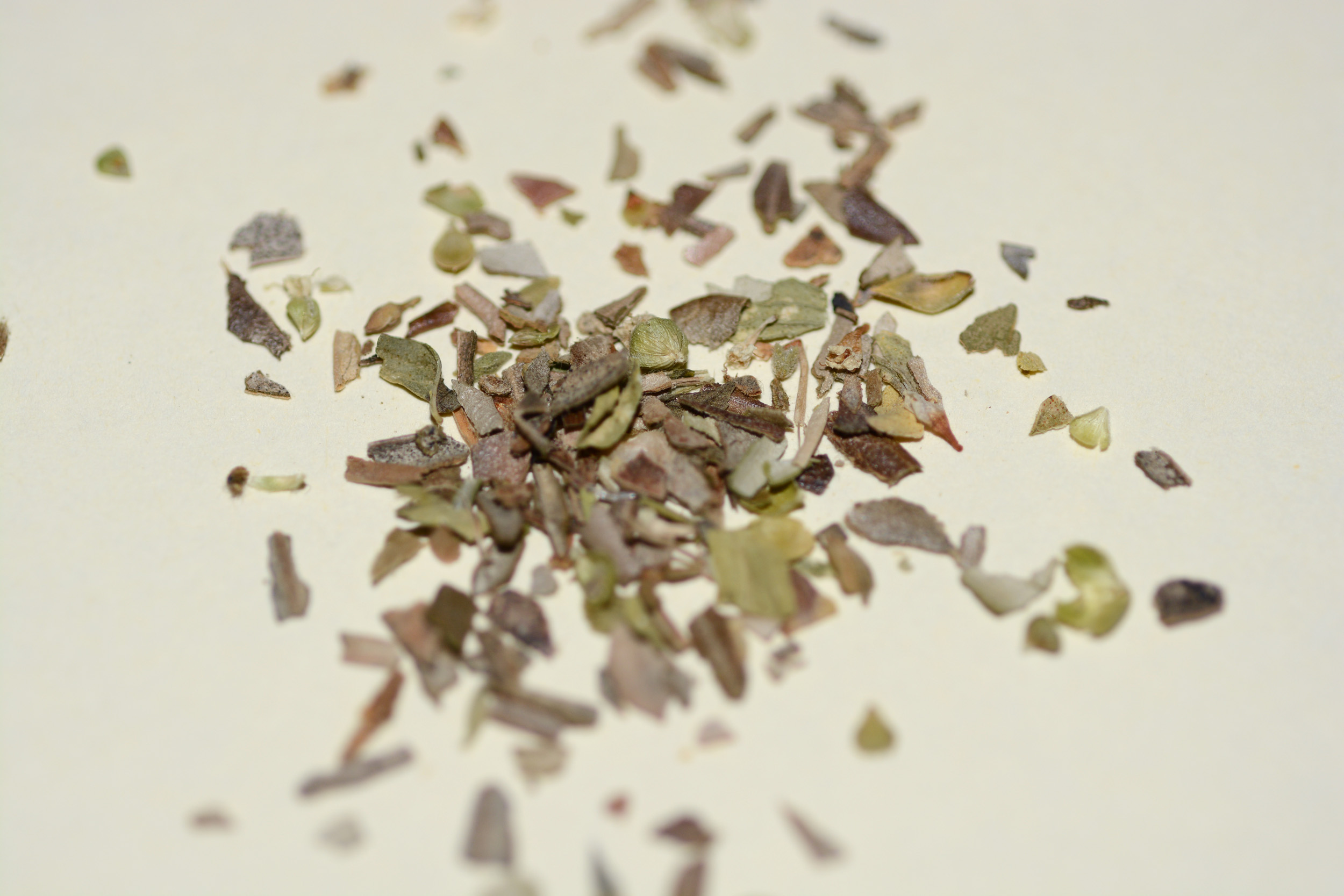
Oregano is among the most commonly used herbs in Albanian cuisine.

Herbs are very popular. A wide variety are readily available at supermarkets or local produce stands across the country. The proximity to the Mediterranean Sea and the ideal climatic conditions allows the cultivation of about 250 aromatic and medical plants. Albania is among the leading producers and exporter of herbs in the world. Further, the country is a worldwide significant producer of oregano, thyme, sage, salvia, rosemary and yellow gentian. The most commonly used herbs and other seasonings in Albanian cooking include artichoke, basil, chili pepper, cinnamon, coriander, lavender, oregano, peppermint, rosemary, thyme, bay, vanilla, and saffron.

== Drinks ==
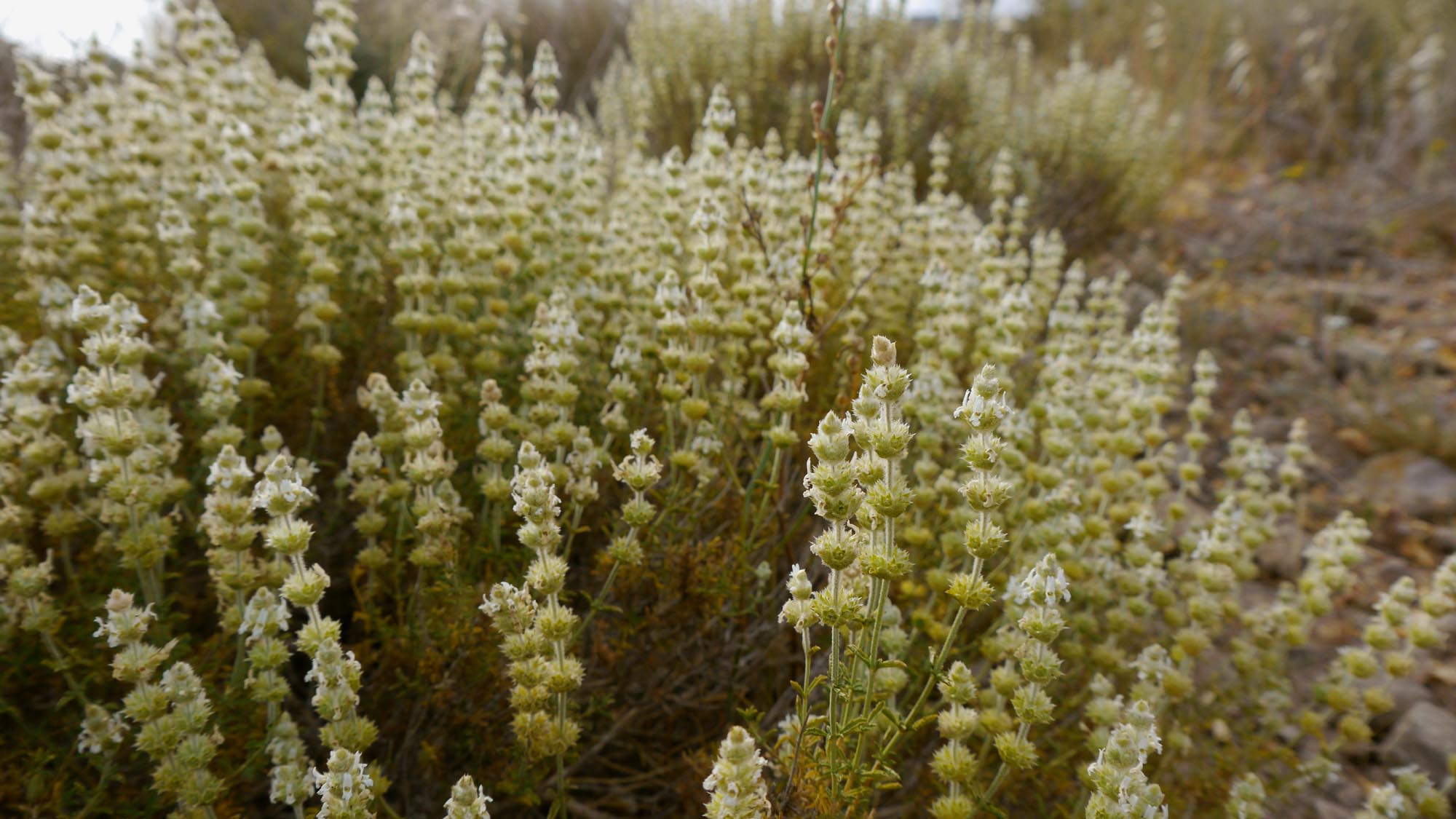
Mountain tea has a long tradition in Albania and is the most popular tea of the locals.

Tea is a widely consumed beverage throughout Albania and particularly served at cafés, restaurants or at home. The country is rich in the cultivation of a wide range of herbs. The most popular varieties of tea drinking in Albania include Albanian-style mountain tea, which grows in the Albanian mountains and villages, and Russian- and Turkish-style black tea with sugar to tea with lemon, milk or honey.

Coffee is another popular beverage in Albania, but more particularly in the cities and villages. There are various varieties of coffee popular in Albania, such as espresso, cappuccino, macchiato, mocha and latte. As Albania was formerly part of the Ottoman Empire, coffee in the Turkish style is also common. Filter coffee and instant coffee are also available. Cafés are found everywhere in urban areas and function as meeting places for socializing and conducting business. Almost all serve baked goods and sandwiches and many also serve light meals. Tirana is particularly well known for its café culture.

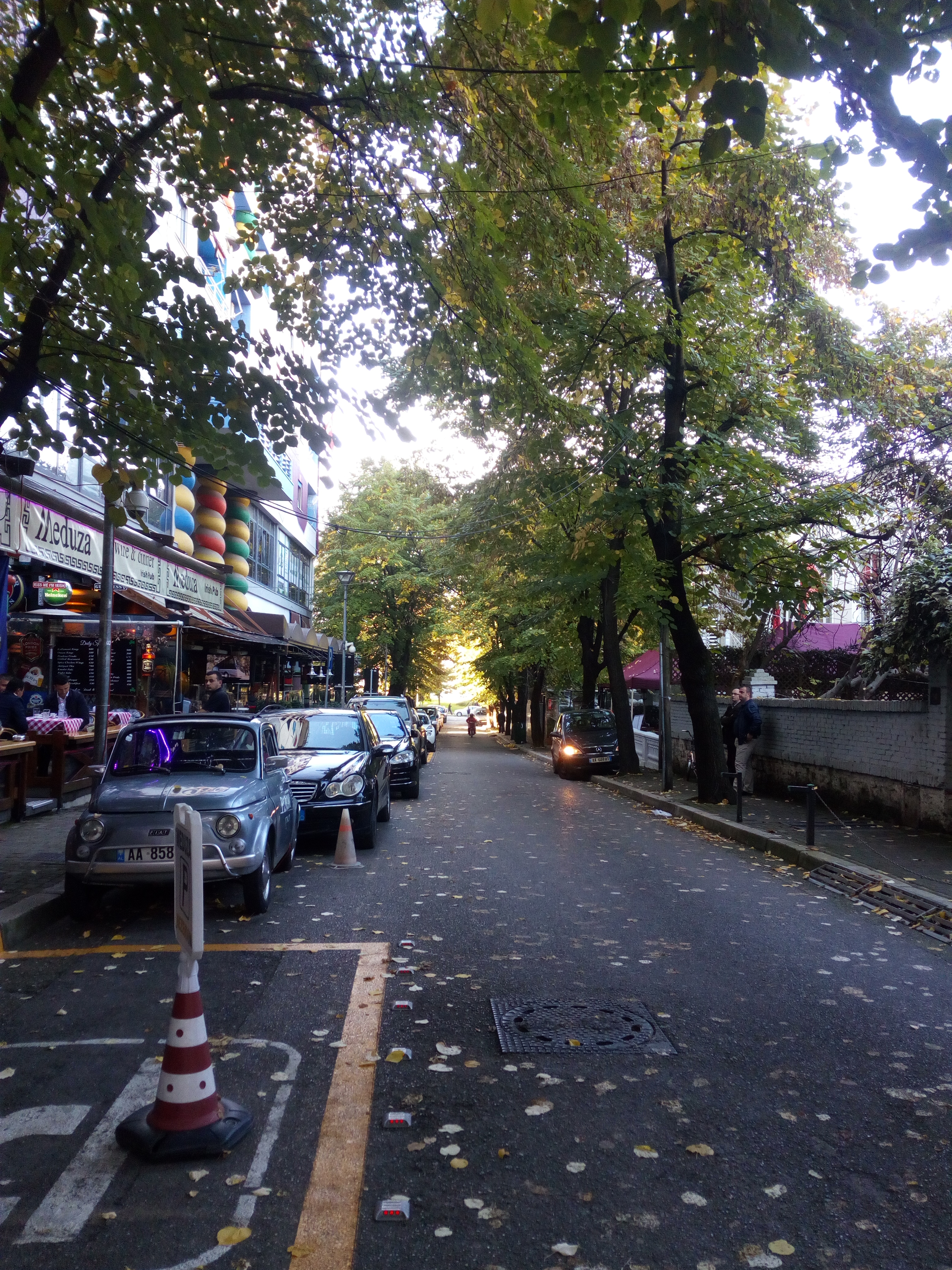
Cafes along Mustafa Matohiti St near Blloku district in central Tirana

In 2016, Albania surpassed Spain by becoming the country with the most coffee houses per capita in the world. In fact, there are 654 coffee houses per 100,000 inhabitants in Albania, a country with only 2.5 million inhabitants.

Dhallë is a traditional and healthy yogurt-based drink in Albania made by blending yogurt with water or milk and spices. It is especially popular during the summer month and it may be served with salt, according to taste.

Boza is a malt drink made from maize (corn) and wheat which is widely consumed with desserts in Albania.

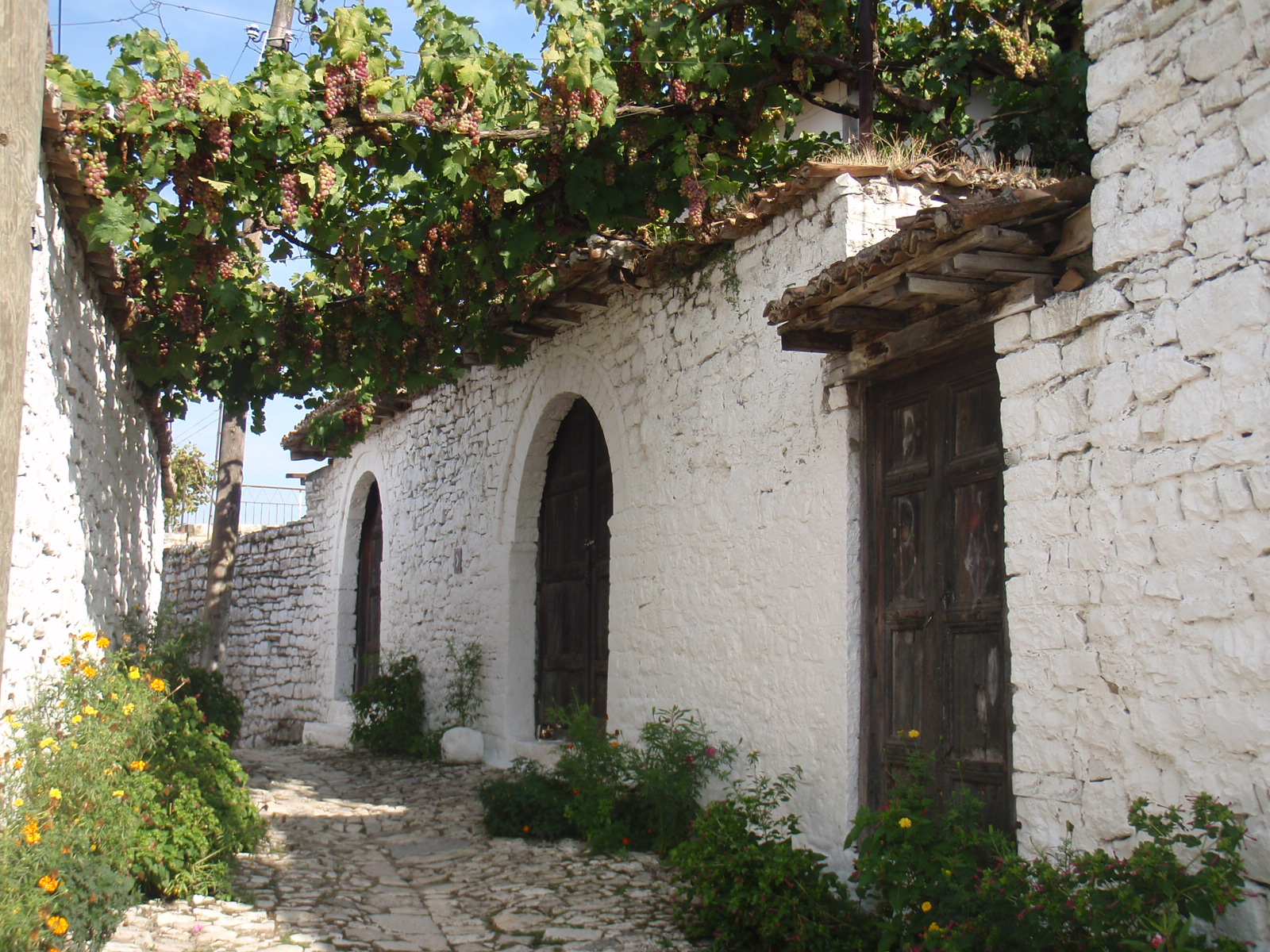
Grapes in Berat. Albanian wine is known for its local varieties and distinct sweetness.

Raki is the most popular spirit in Albania. It is considered as the national spirit beverage of the country. The most common types of raki in the country are grape, plum or blackberry. It is commonly served to the older people and is heated and sweetened with honey or sugar, with added spices. Although in the south of the country, Raki rigoni is very popular among the people and is made of white oregano, that is cultivated in the region.

Albania is traditionally a wine-drinking country. The people of Albania drink wine in moderation and almost always at meals or social occasions. Albanians drink about 5.83 liters of wine per person per year, which has been increasing since the Albanian production of high-quality wine grows to meet demand. The origins of wine production in Albania can be traced back to 6,000 years and evidence suggesting wine production confirm that Albania is among the earliest wine producers in Europe.

== Pastries and desserts ==
There is a strong tradition of home baking in the country and pâtisseries are present in every city and village across the country. Entirely Albanian desserts and pastries consist primarily of fruits including oranges and lemons that grow as well as in the country. Traditionally, fresh fruits are often eaten after a meal as a dessert. Those dishes are inspired from both Western and Eastern civilizations.

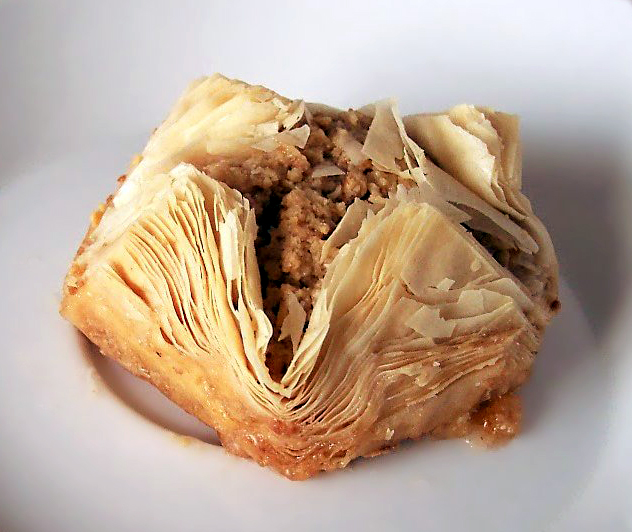
Baklava

Kanojët is a typical Sicilian pastry and very common among the Arbëreshë people, who brought the recipe for the pastry back to their Albanian homeland, where it remains popular to this day.. It is made of tube-shaped shells of fried pastry dough, filled with a sweet, creamy filling usually containing ricotta. The kanojët from Piana degli Albanesi, an Arbëreshë village, are often referred to as the best cannolo.

Baklava is made frequently in Albania, especially around certain religious holidays of Muslims, Catholics and Orthodox. It is prepared on large trays and cut into a variety of shapes. Baklava is made either with hazelnuts or walnuts sweetened with syrup.

Petulla is a traditional fried dough made from wheat or buckwheat flour, which is served with powdered sugar or feta cheese and raspberry jam.

Pandispanjë is a traditional base for several Albanian desserts and cakes based on flour, sugar, butter and eggs. A variety of fillings are used, such as jelly, chocolate, fruit and pastry cream.

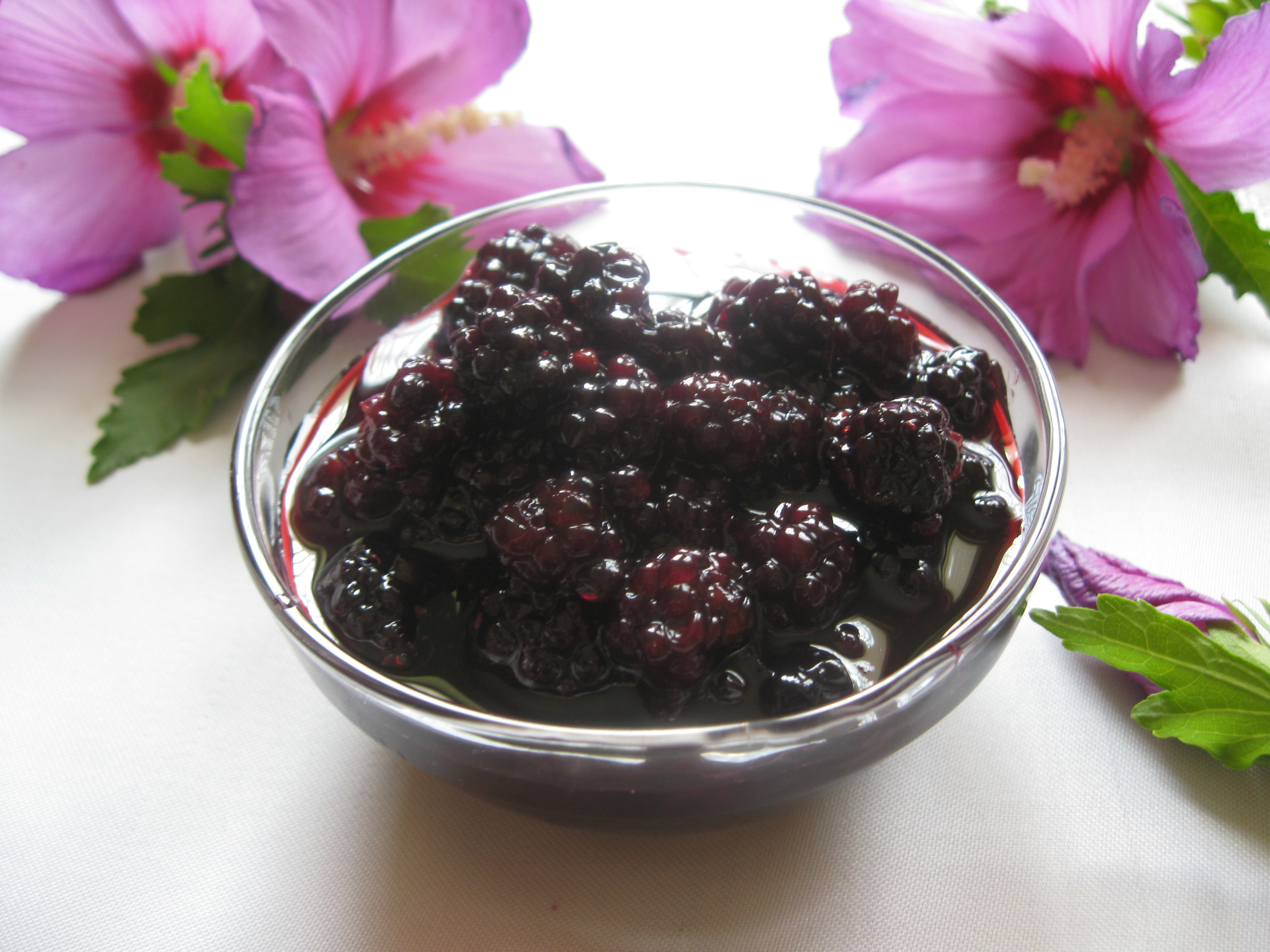
Blackberry jam

Ballokume is an Albanian cookie, which originated in Elbasan during the Middle Ages and is prepared every year on Summer Day, a public holiday in the country. It has to be brewed in large copper pots, tightly whipped with a wooden spoon and baked in a wood oven.

Fruit jam, also known as reçel, is enjoyed all year in Albania and a major component of the Albanian cooking tradition. The fruit preserve is made by cooking the juice of the fruit, or the fruit itself, with sugar. It is served with many dishes as a side dish.

Zupa is a popular dessert and assembled by alternating layers of cookies or sponge cake with pastry cream. A similar dessert is an Albanian custard dessert called krem karamele, very similar to crème brûlée. This dessert is made with milk, cream, egg yolks, sugar, and vanilla and flavored with orange or lemon zest and cinnamon.

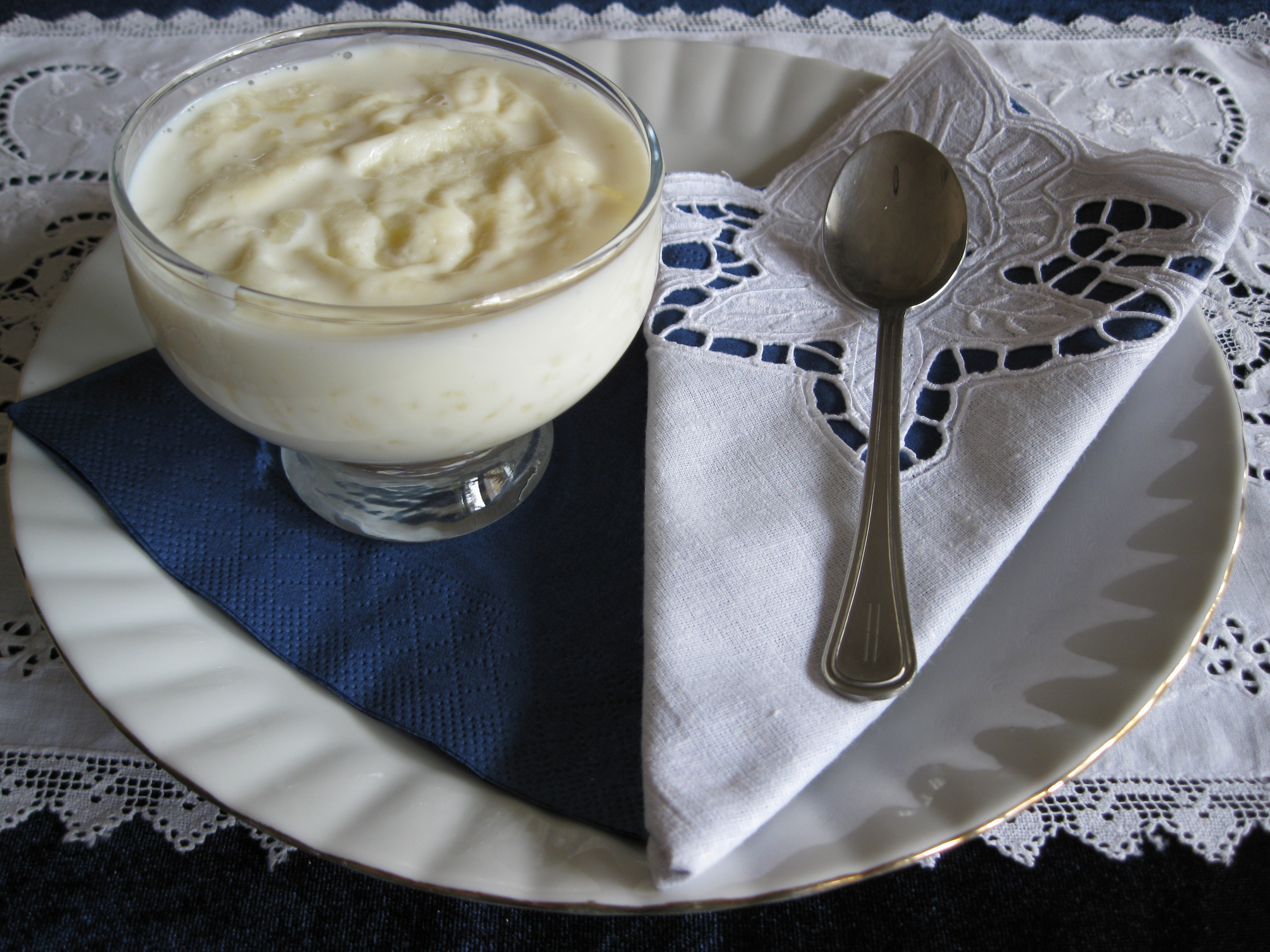
Tambëloriz

Various kinds of hallvë are prepared across the country with some of the most common types being flour halva, although home-cooked semolina halva and shop-produced sesame halva are also consumed. It is a typical sweet in local religious fairs around Albania.

Tambëloriz, also known as sultjash, is a popular sweet among the Albanian population across the world. It is a kind of rice pudding made from milk, rice, and cinnamon; nuts and raisins may be added.

Tollumba is a fried, crispy, and sweet dessert traditionally eaten in the Balkan Peninsula. It is made of bits of fried dough, similar to doughnuts, steeped in lemony syrup. The dough contains starch and semolina, which keeps it light and crispy.

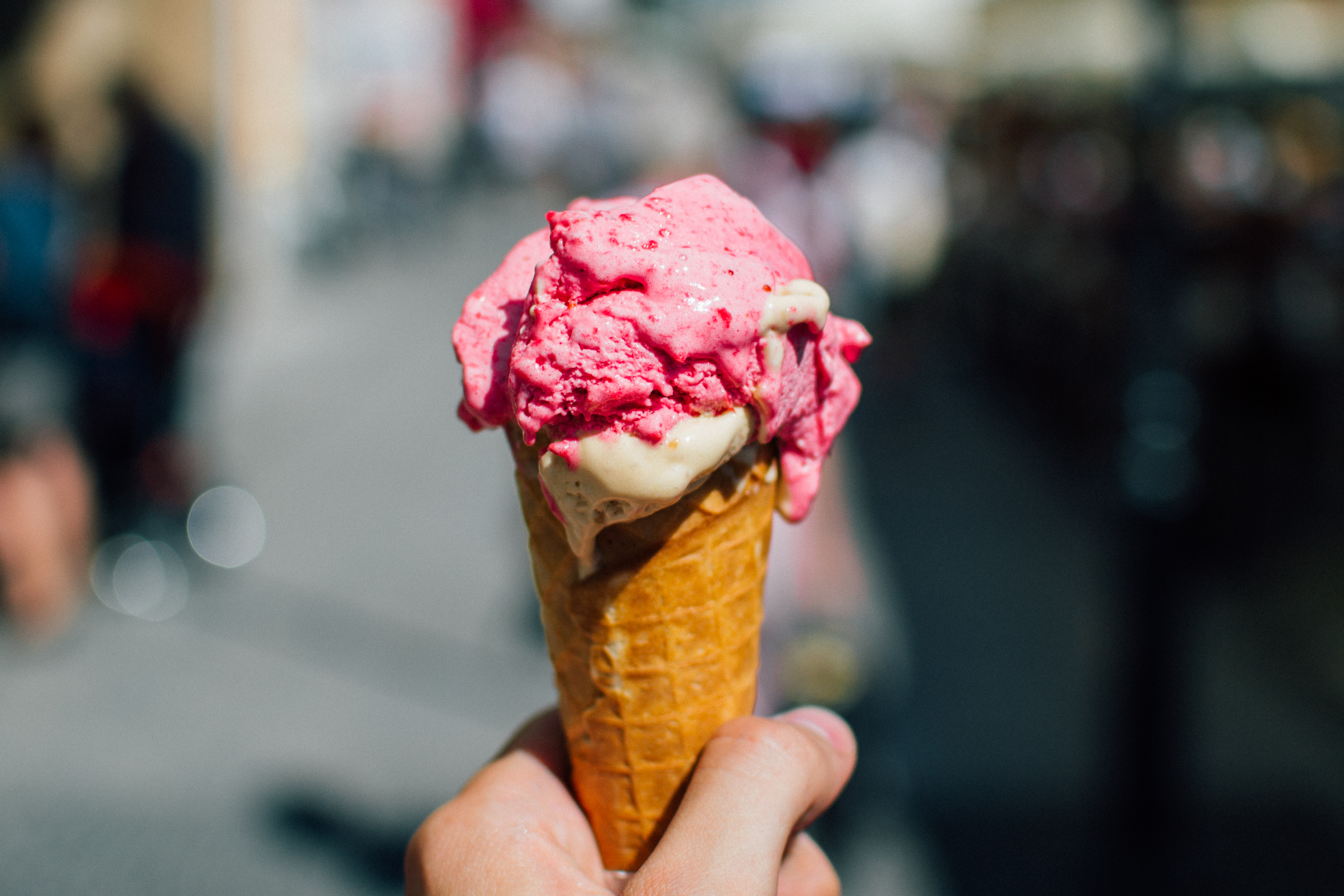
Akullore

Akullore is the Albanian word for ice cream and it is enjoyed in both summer and winter.

Kadaif is a pastry made from long thin noodle threads filled with walnuts or pistachios and sweetened with syrup; it is sometimes served alongside baklava.

Kabuni is a traditional cold-served Albanian dessert made of rice fried in butter, mutton broth, raisins, salt and caramelized sugar. It is then boiled before sugar, cinnamon, and ground cloves are added.

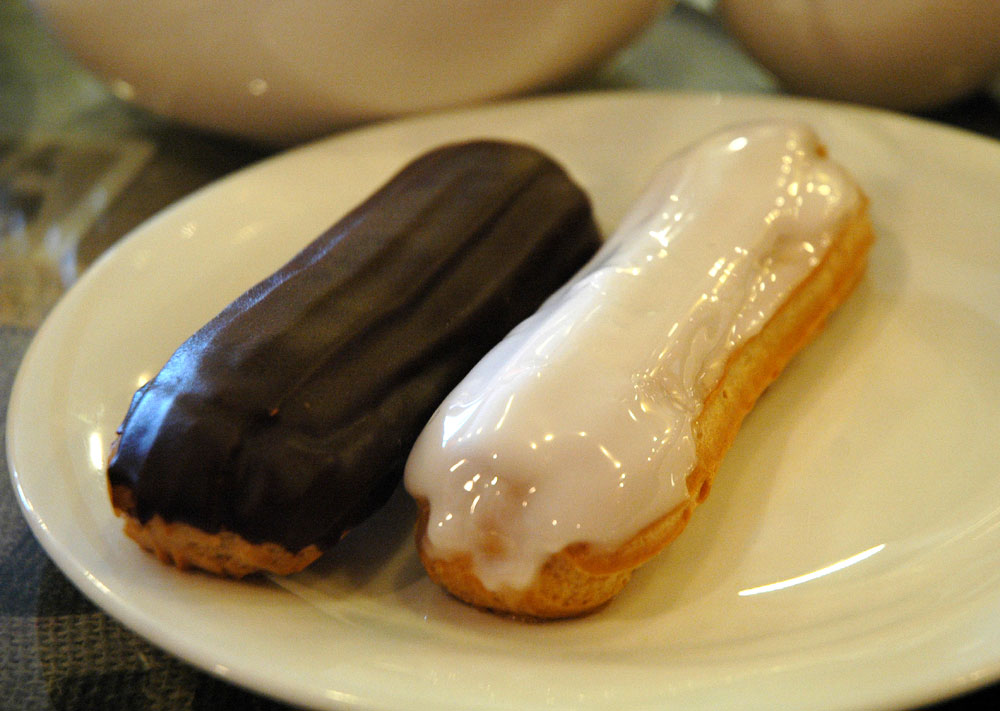
Pastashu

Pastashu is made from choux pastry, filled with a cream, vanilla, coffee or chocolate-flavoured custard and then topped usually with fondant icing. This dessert is known as éclair in France and bignè in Italy.

Trileçe is an Albanian adaptation of the Latin American tres leches cake. It is a sponge cake made of three milks from cow, goat and water buffaloes, while cow's milk and cream are used commonly. According to Hürriyet, Albania was the first country to introduce the dessert from America into the area. It is believed that the popularity of Latin American soap operas in Albania led local chefs to reverse-engineer the dessert and then the speciality spread over to Turkey.

Ashure, the world's oldest dessert, is served especially during Muslim (Bektashi) holidays in Albania. It is a congee that is made of a mixture consisting of grains, nuts as well as fruits and dried fruits.

== Appetizers and salads ==
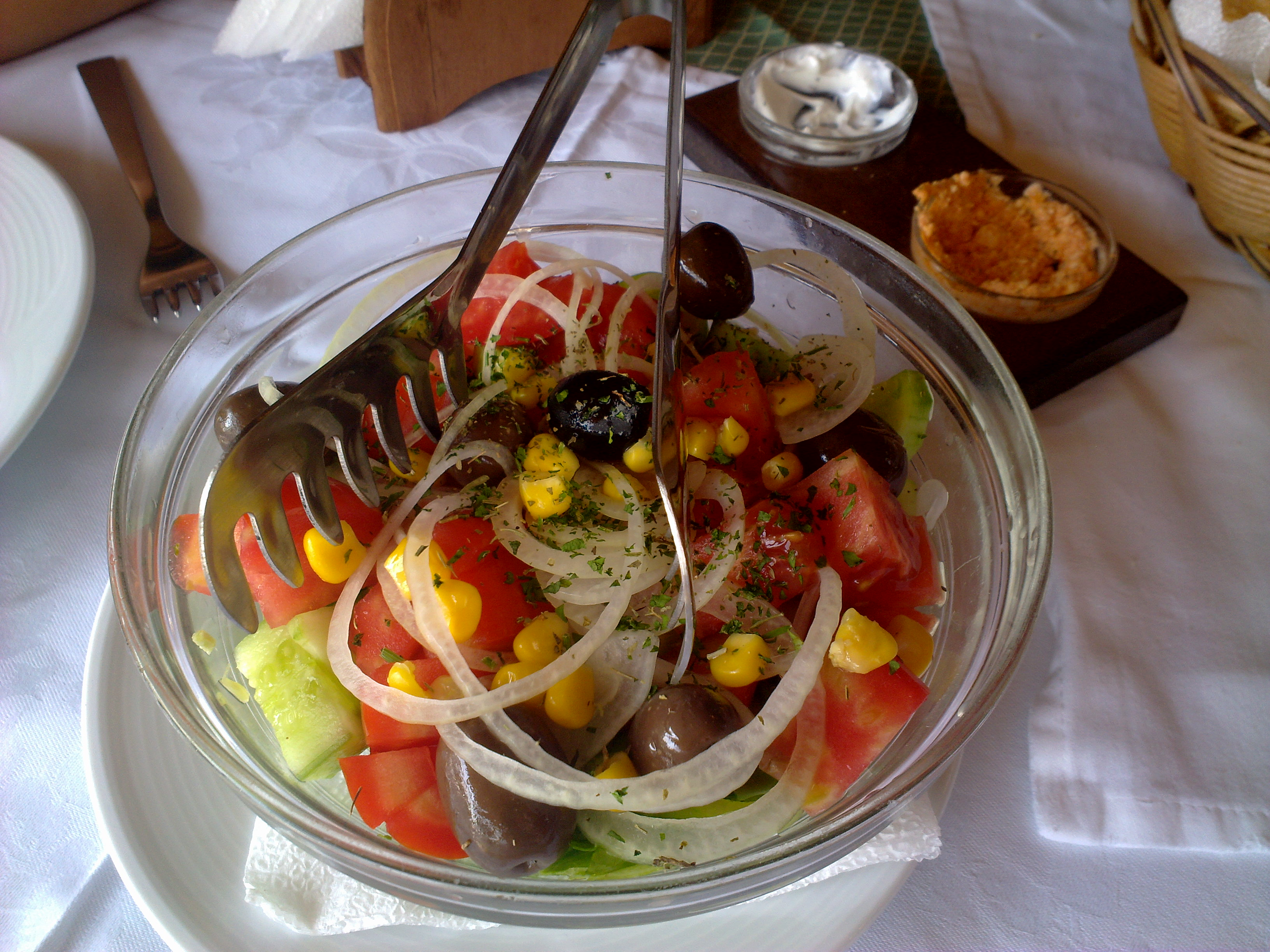
A typical Albanian vegetable salad

Popular appetizers in Albania include wheat bread or cornbread. Bread remains one of the most important foods and is ever-present on the Albanian table. The expression for 'going to eat a meal' (Albanian: për të ngrënë bukë) can be literally translated as 'going to eat bread'. In Albania, bread is part of the authentic Albanian hospitality saying of "bread, salt and heart" (bukë, kripë e zemër).

Vegetable salads are almost always served along with both lunch and dinner, which largely consist of dishes based on meat. Ingredients routinely used in salads are green or red peppers, onions, tomatoes, olives and cucumbers. Salads representative of Albanian cuisine are dressed with salt, olive oil or lemon and vinegar. The usual dressings are based on garlic, lemon and black pepper.

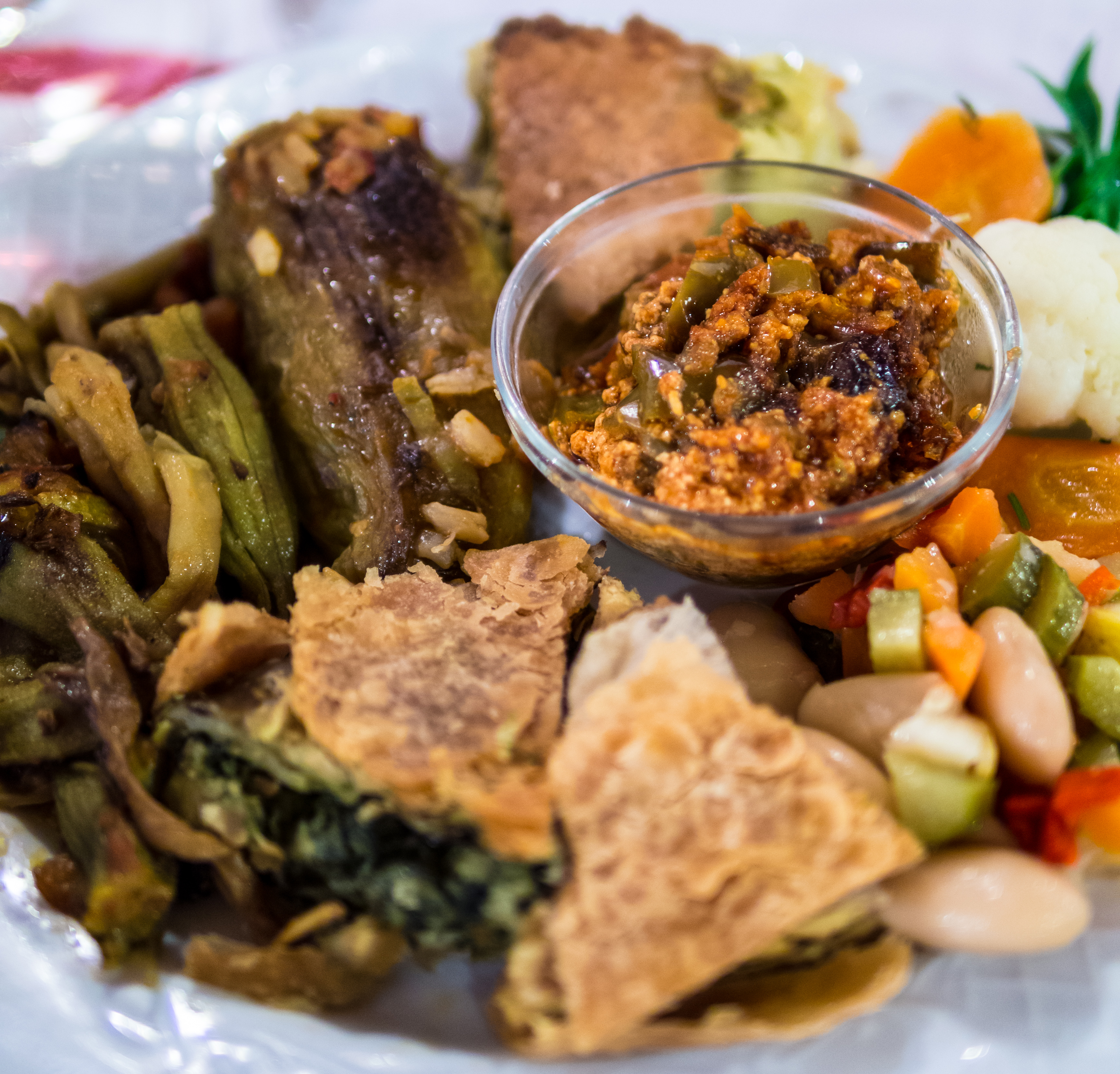
Speca të ferguara (roasted peppers) served with pite

An Albanian-style meze of fresh and cooked vegetable salads, pickled cucumbers and other vegetables, hard-boiled eggs, prosciutto, salami and feta cheese, accompanied with roasted bell peppers, olive oil and garlic, is served at festive meals and in restaurants. Contemporary Albanian meze include a combination of traditional and modern appetizers.

Fërgesë verore (summer fërgesë) is the vegetarian version of fërgesë, a national dish in Albania made of green and red peppers, and sometimes eggs, along with skinned tomatoes and onions and often served as a side dish to various meat dishes.

Japrak is a stuffed vegetable dish made with grape leaves, olive oil and stuffed with rice, grilled beef and chopped onions, and generally served cold with bread and tarator.

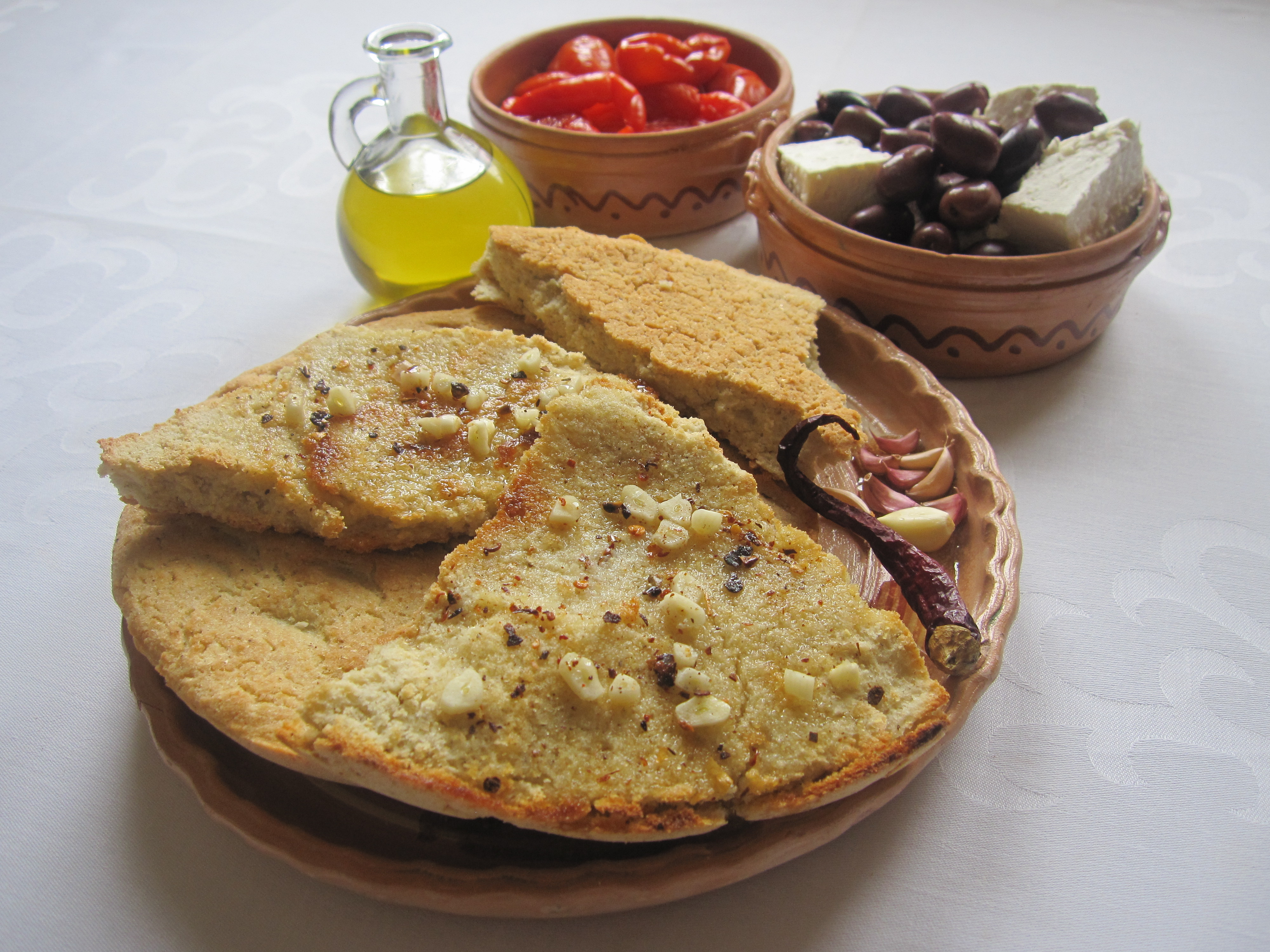
Bukë misri (cornbread)

Tarator is a cold appetizer and usually served cold as a side dish during the hot summer months. The ingredients of tarator include cucumber, garlic, olive oil, salt and yoghurt. Fried and grilled vegetables and seafood are usually offered with tarator.

Large white kidney beans (fasulle plaqi) are a typical appetizer or side dish, baked in an earthen pot with tomatoes, onions, peppermint, oregano, bay leaves and black pepper.

A variety of soups are enjoyed, particularly in the winter. Especially popular soups are potato, cabbage, bean and fish soups. Trahana (tarhana), a soup composed of wheat and fermented milk, is commonly consumed in Albania as well as other areas of the Eastern Mediterranean, often - as noted above - consumed at breakfast. Other dishes include groshët and shqeto, which originated from the Lunxheri region of Gjirokastër.

Other dishes include mëlci pule, eggplant appetizers, panaret (which is famous among Arbëreshës), stuffed peppers composed of green peppers stuffed with rice, meat, other vegetables and herbs, turshi lakre, fried sardele me limon, papare, which are bread leftovers cooked with water, egg, butter, and gjizë (salted curd cheese) and bread and cheese referred as bukë me djathë.

== Meat and fish ==
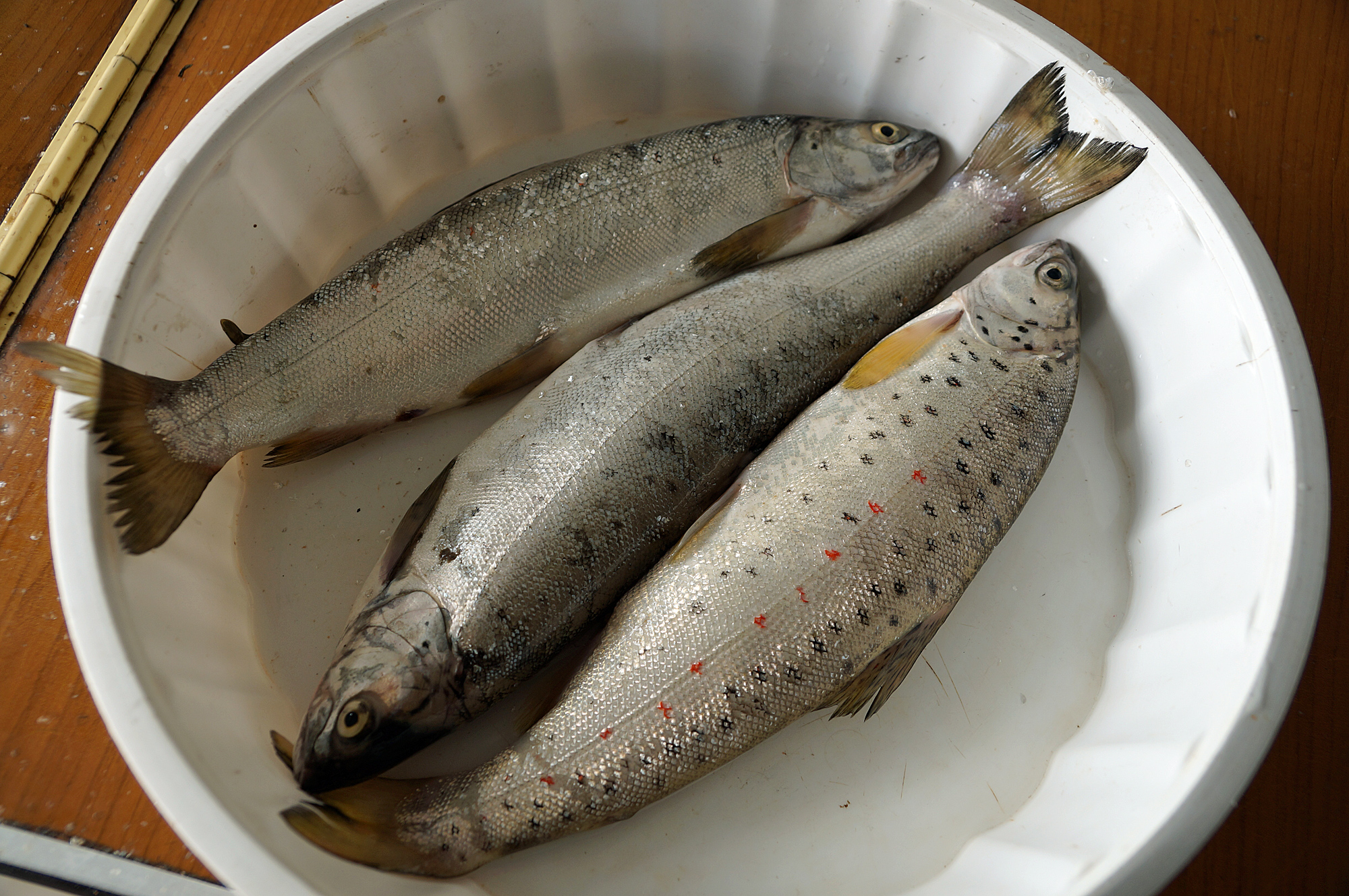
Ohrid trout is found only in Lake Ohrid.

The country's cuisine is largely meat-based. Beef and veal are the most commonly consumed meats in Albania, followed by pork. Albania has many small eateries specializing in beef and lamb, goat and veal. In high elevation localities, smoked meat and pickled preserves are common. Animal organs are also used in dishes such as intestines and the head among other parts, which are considered a delicacy.

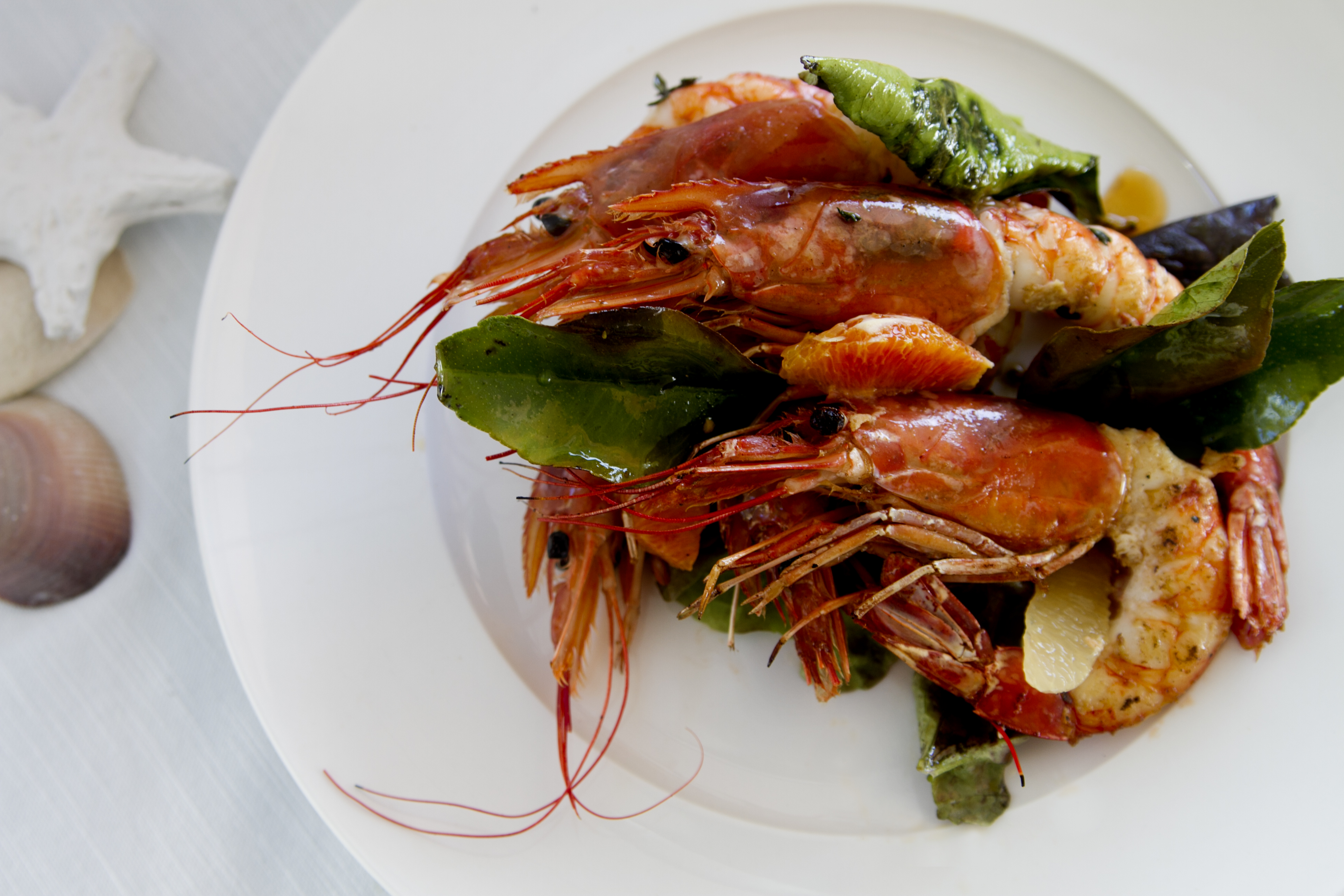
Scampi are popular along the coasts.

Fresh fish is readily available and caught off the coastal areas of the Adriatic and Ionian Sea inside the Mediterranean Sea but also from the Lake Butrint, Lake Shkodër, Lake Ohrid, Lake Prespa as well as Karavasta Lagoon, Narta Lagoon and Patos Lagoon. Fresh fish is served whole, in the Mediterranean style, grilled, boiled, fried whole or in slices, dressed only with freshly squeezed lemon juice. Fish dishes are often flavoured with white vinegar and virgin olive oil, which particularly grows in Southern Albania.

Albanians living in the coastal cities, especially in Durrës, Sarandë and Vlorë are passionate about their seafood specialties. Popular seafood dishes include trout, calamari, octopus, cuttlefish, red mullet, sea bass, gilt-head bream and others. Baked whiting, carp, mullet or eel with olive oil and garlic are also widely consumed in the country.

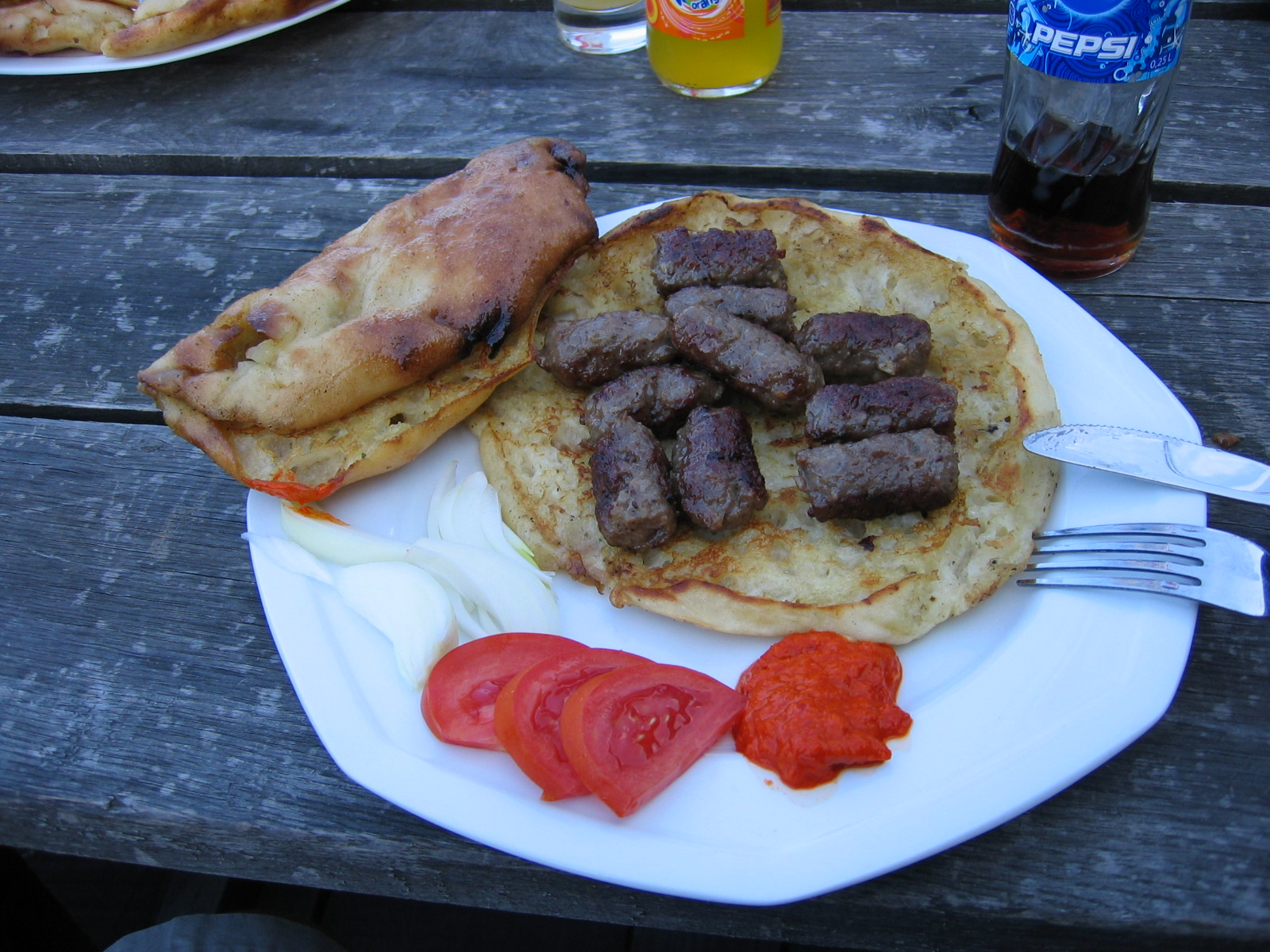
Plate with qebapa

Fërgesë is the most iconic dish from Tirana and Central Albania. It consists of peppers, tomatoes, onions and gjizë (Albanian ricotta). Ingredients are cooked on the stove and then in the oven to make a relatively dense sauce. Some versions of the dish include liver or cooked beef. Fërgesë with liver is considered more traditional in Tirana and is thus sometimes called just fërgesë tirane.

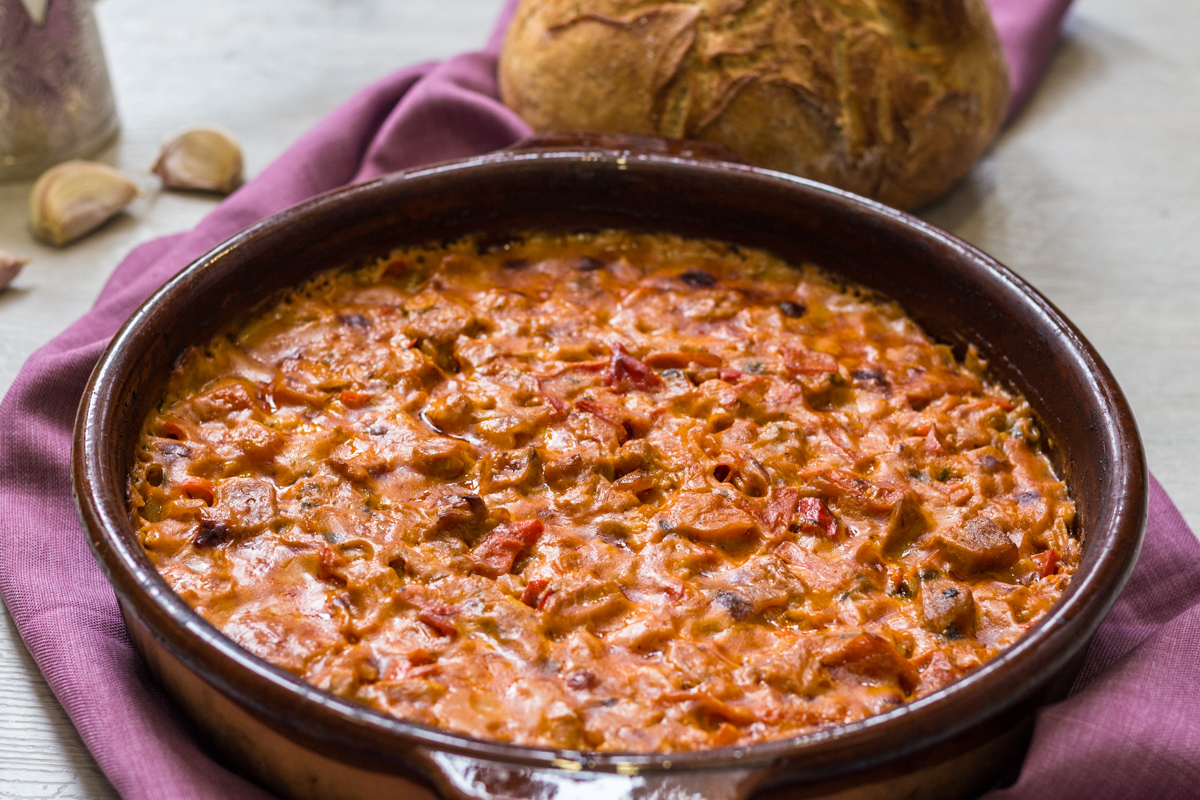
Fergesë with beef

Tavë kosi is a national dish in Albania that is beloved throughout the country. The speciality is a simple dish of baked lamb and rice, served with a flavored yogurt sauce. Recently, it has become very popular among the Greeks and Turks associated with the large Albanian diaspora in Greece and Turkey.

Qebapa are small homemade grilled meat skinless sausages made of lamb and beef mix. They are primarily served with onions, sour cream, ajvar and pita bread called pitalka.

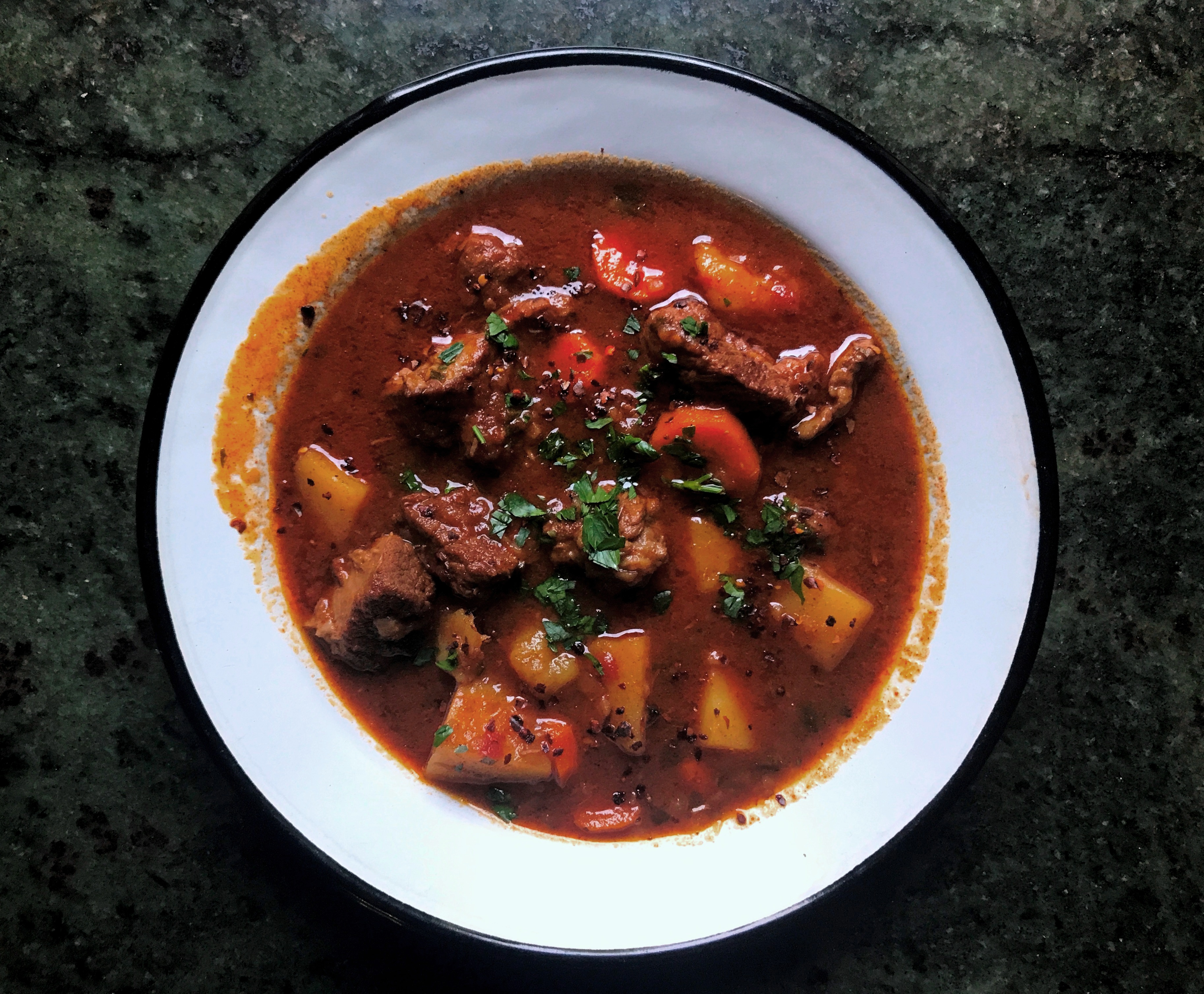
A plate of gullash

Gullash, or tasqebap, is eaten very frequently in the mountainous areas of Albania. It is a traditional paprika-spiced meat stew originating in Hungary that is popular throughout Central Europe and the Balkans.

Gjel deti me përshesh (turkey with përshesh) is a common New Year's dish in many Albanian families and also consumed in other celebrations. The turkey is first boiled and then roasted and served with përshesh, which is prepared by baking pieces of kulaç (a kind of bread) with turkey broth, along with mint and other spices.

Paçe is traditionally common in Albania. It is made with a sheep's, pig's or any cattle's head, boiled until meat comes off easily. It is then stewed with garlic, onion, black pepper and vinegar. Sometimes a little flour is added to thicken the stew.

Proshute is a term used in Albania for many types of salami and ham, which has been seasoned, cured and air-dried. It is served rather at breakfast or lunch as an appetizer. Dishes which consist of proshute include omelete me proshute dhe djathe, role buke me proshute and sallate orizi me pjeper dhe proshute.

Qofte are fried meatballs, which are usually made of minced meat, herbs and spices and cooked with tomato sauce and vegetables or beans. Throughout the country there are few specialized shops called qofteri, which offer qofte and beer.

== Pies ==
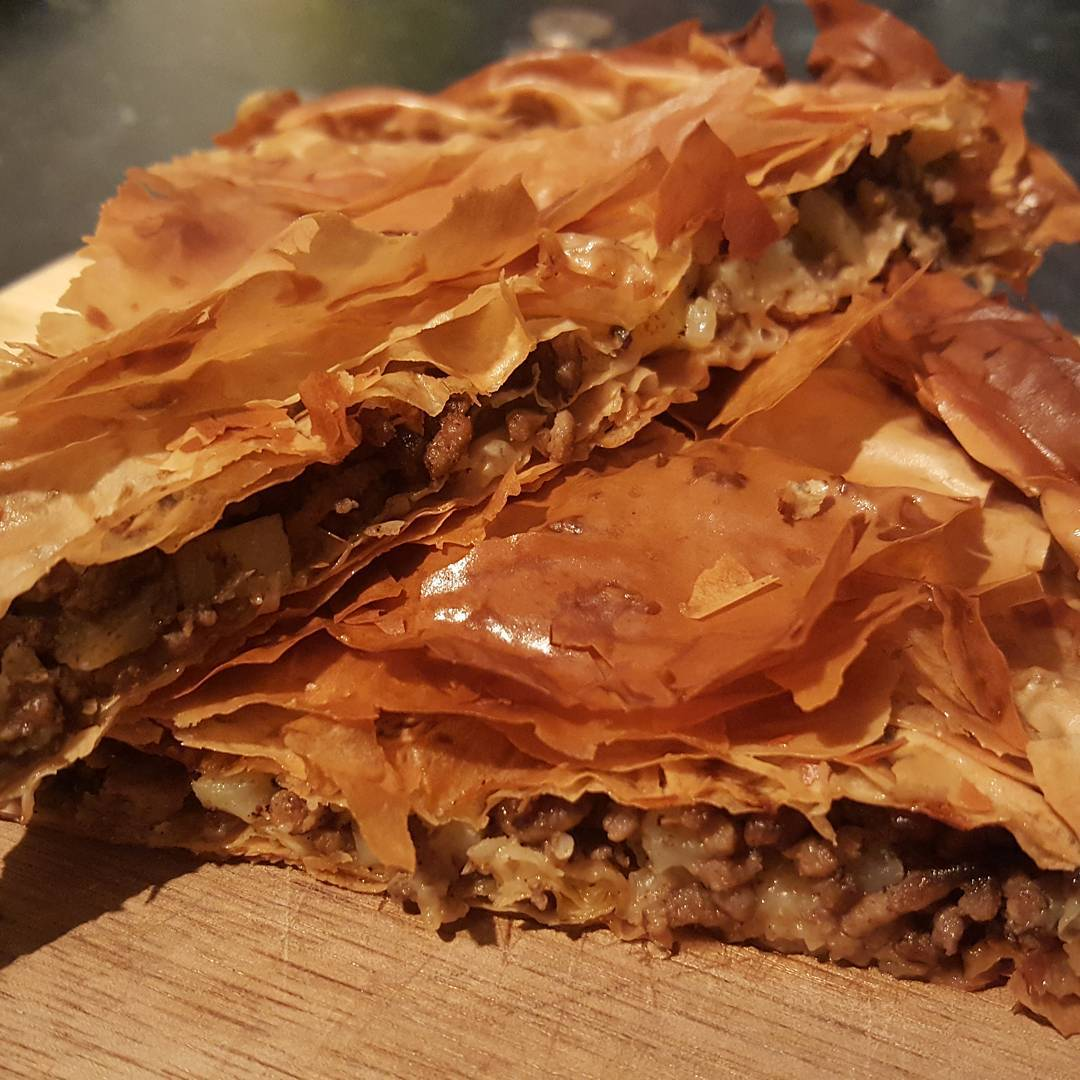
Pite me mish, or byrek

Pite is considered as well one of the national foods of Albania by most Albanians. Several internationally renowned musicians of Albanian heritage such as Rita Ora, Dua Lipa and Action Bronson publicized their passion for this Albanian dish.

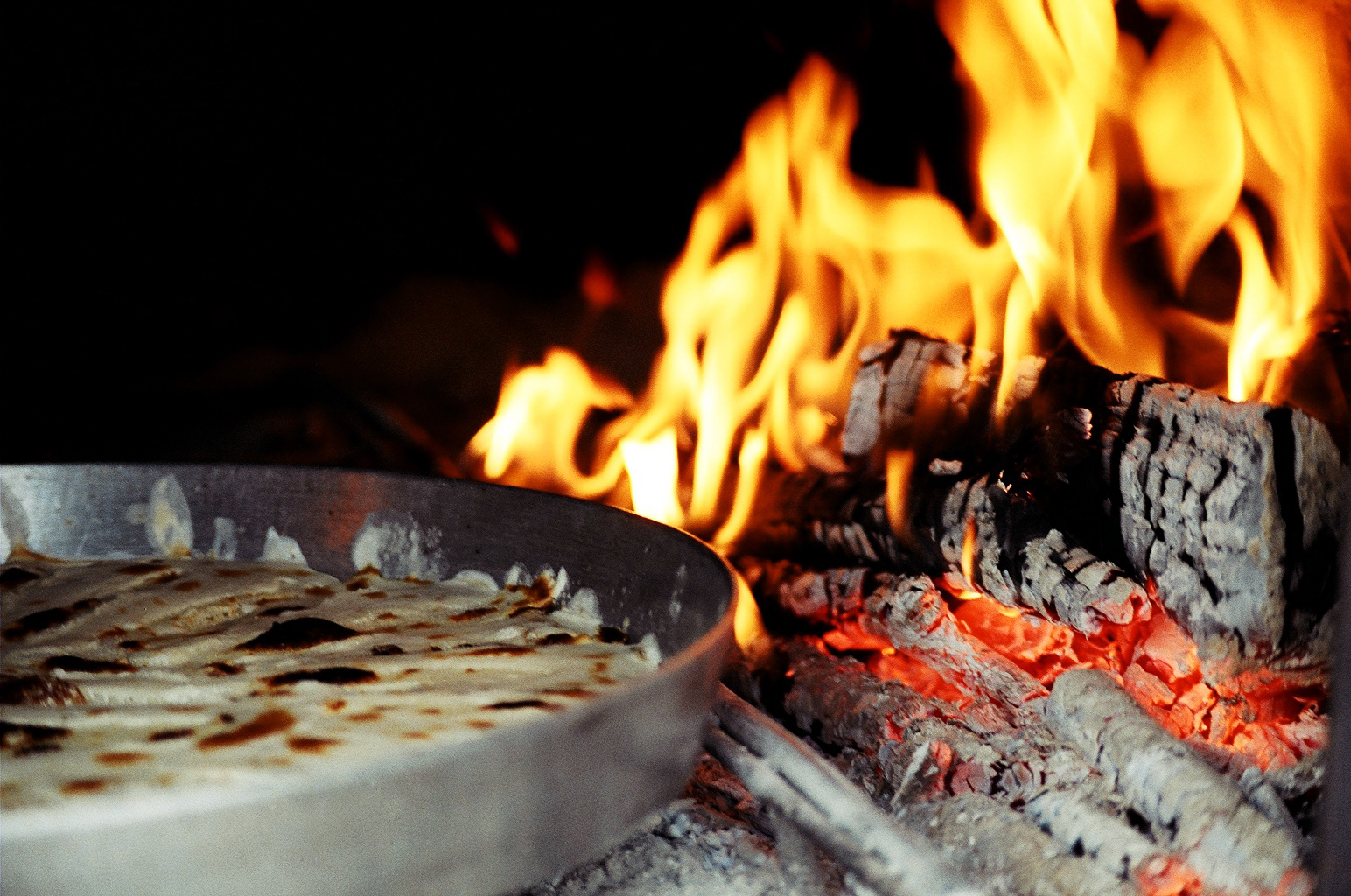
Flia

It is often served hot, fresh and with pickled vegetables, honey, yogurt or fruit jam. Nowadays, flia mainly features in large social gatherings, weddings, births and other ceremonies and events. Fli is a dish mainly cooked in Kosovo. The dishes may differ depending on the region of Albania. Fli is made carefully and in a different way with a specific type of charcoal lid. Bakllasarëm is a layered pie, otherwise known as pite, without anything inside, which is covered with yogurt and garlic and then heated again. It is particularly eaten for lunch. Another popular dish is kungullur, which is made of filo pastry layers filled with mashed pumpkin, butter, salt, or sugar.

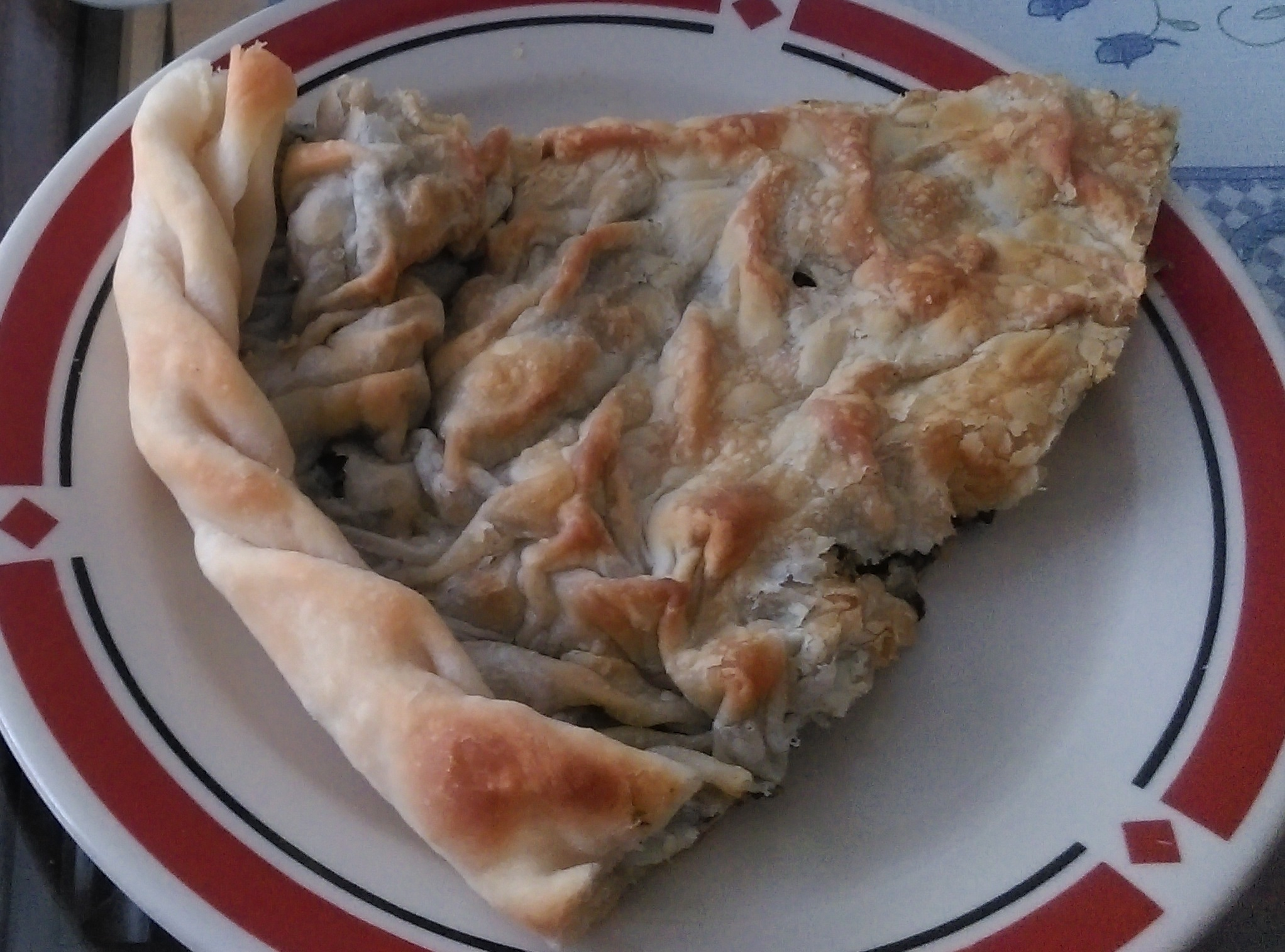
Lakror with spinach filling

Notable pies include byrek, pepeq, shaprak, qollopita or lakror. Lakror is a pie that has layers of dough thinner than a byrek and it is traditionally cooked on embers, covered with a metal semispherical lid. Common fillings are leek and gjizë or tomato and onion. It is a specialty of Southern Albanian regions, like Lunxheri or Korça.

== Health effects ==
Albanian cuisine is classified as part of the "Mediterranean diet," which includes a high consumption of seafood, vegetables, fruit, nuts, and olive oil; however, beef, veal, lamb, and pork are commonly consumed as well. It is believed that because of this diet Albania has a very high life expectancy when its economic power is compared to other countries, characterized by some researchers as the "Albanian paradox".

== See also ==
- Arbëreshë cuisine
- Kosovan cuisine
- Cham cuisine
