= Tres leches cake =

Latin American sponge cake

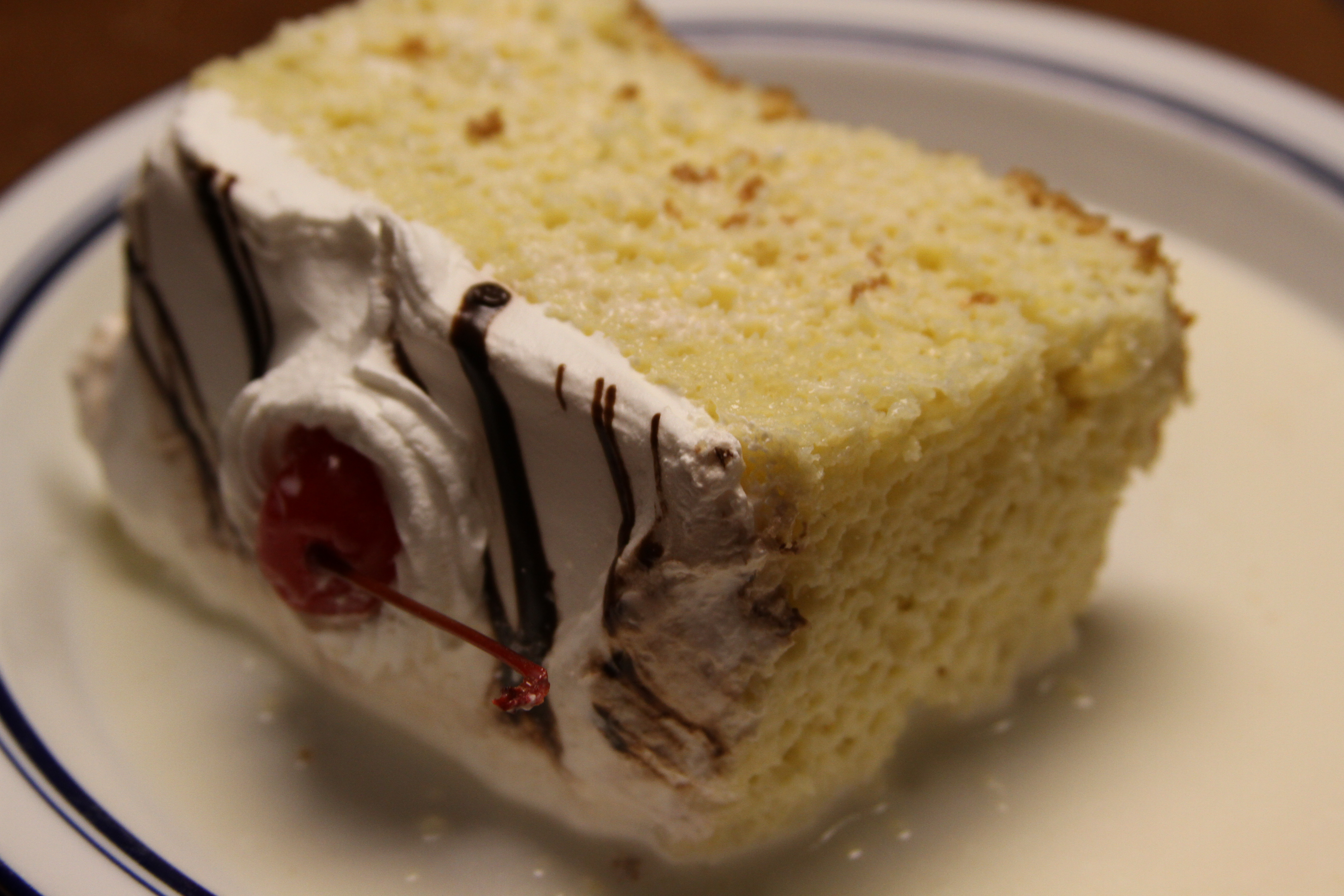
- A slice of tres leches cake
- Alternative names: Torta de tres, Trileçe or trileqe (Albanian), трилече or Trileche (Bulgarian and North Macedonian), trileçe (Turkish), trileće (Bosnia & Herzegovina, Serbia, Croatia), pan tres leches, bizcocho de tres leches, pastel de tres leches
- Type: Sponge cake
- Place of origin: Latin America
- Region or state: Latin America, Mexico, Nicaragua
- Main ingredients: Cake base; evaporated milk, condensed milk, heavy cream

A tres leches cake (lit. 'three-milk cake'; Spanish: pastel de tres leches, torta de tres leches or bizcocho de tres leches), also known as dulce de tres leches (lit. 'three-milk sweet'), pan tres leches (lit. 'three-milk bread') or simply tres leches (lit. 'three milks'), is a Latin American sponge cake soaked in evaporated milk, condensed milk and whole milk. It is often topped with whipped cream, fruit, and cinnamon.

Tres leches is a light cake with many air bubbles. This spongy texture is why it does not have a soggy consistency despite being soaked in a mixture of three types of milk. A variation has spread to Southeastern Europe, especially Albania, Bosnia and Herzegovina and Turkey, where it is known as trileçe or trileće.

== History ==
The history of the tres leches cake is debated. European countries have long held the tradition of "soaked" cakes. England, Italy, France, Portugal, and Spain have soaked cakes dating back to the Middle Ages. This tradition is thought to have influenced the creation of the tres leches cake in Latin America.

By 1896, the U.S. Department of Commerce was exporting condensed milk to Nicaragua. Cattle, sugarcane plantations, and milk preservation techniques were introduced to Nicaragua by that time, by way of American military occupation.

In 1936, President Franklin D. Roosevelt signed a trade agreement with Nicaragua, which "reduced Nicaraguan duties" in favor of importing dairy products from Wisconsin, including evaporated, powdered, and condensed milk. Several companies including Nestle started posting recipes for tres leches on their evaporated and condensed milk containers. Additionally, in part due to the food insecurity of the Great Depression, canned milk sales "skyrocketed" in Nicaragua.

In Tabasco, Mexico, a dessert named torta de leche consisted of "sweetened scalded milk, baked and served floating in its milk sauce".

Recipes for soaked-cake desserts were seen in some Latin American countries as early as the 19th century, in countries like El Salvador, likely a result of the large cross-cultural transfer which took place between Europe and the Americas. Soaked cakes were extant in medieval Europe. The Austin Chronicle cited English rum cake, trifle, fruitcake, and bread pudding, Italian zuppa inglese, and medieval Portuguese sopa dorada as possible soaked-cake influences. The cake is popular in Central America, North America, many parts of the Caribbean, Canary Islands, Albania, Bosnia and Herzegovina, North Macedonia, Serbia and other parts of Europe.

In the US, the cake became popular in the 1980s, beginning in Miami, due to the large Nicaraguan immigration. Its popularity then spread across the US, possibly from Los Ranchos restaurant in Miami, which featured it on its menu when the restaurant opened in 1981. The cake was so popular at Los Ranchos that its recipe was featured on its fliers, which were pervasively distributed. The Joy of Cooking included a tres leches recipe in its 1997 edition. Since the pandemic of 2020, the cake has been growing in popularity, potentially due to its use of shelf stable milk and pantry staples.

=== Balkan variation ===
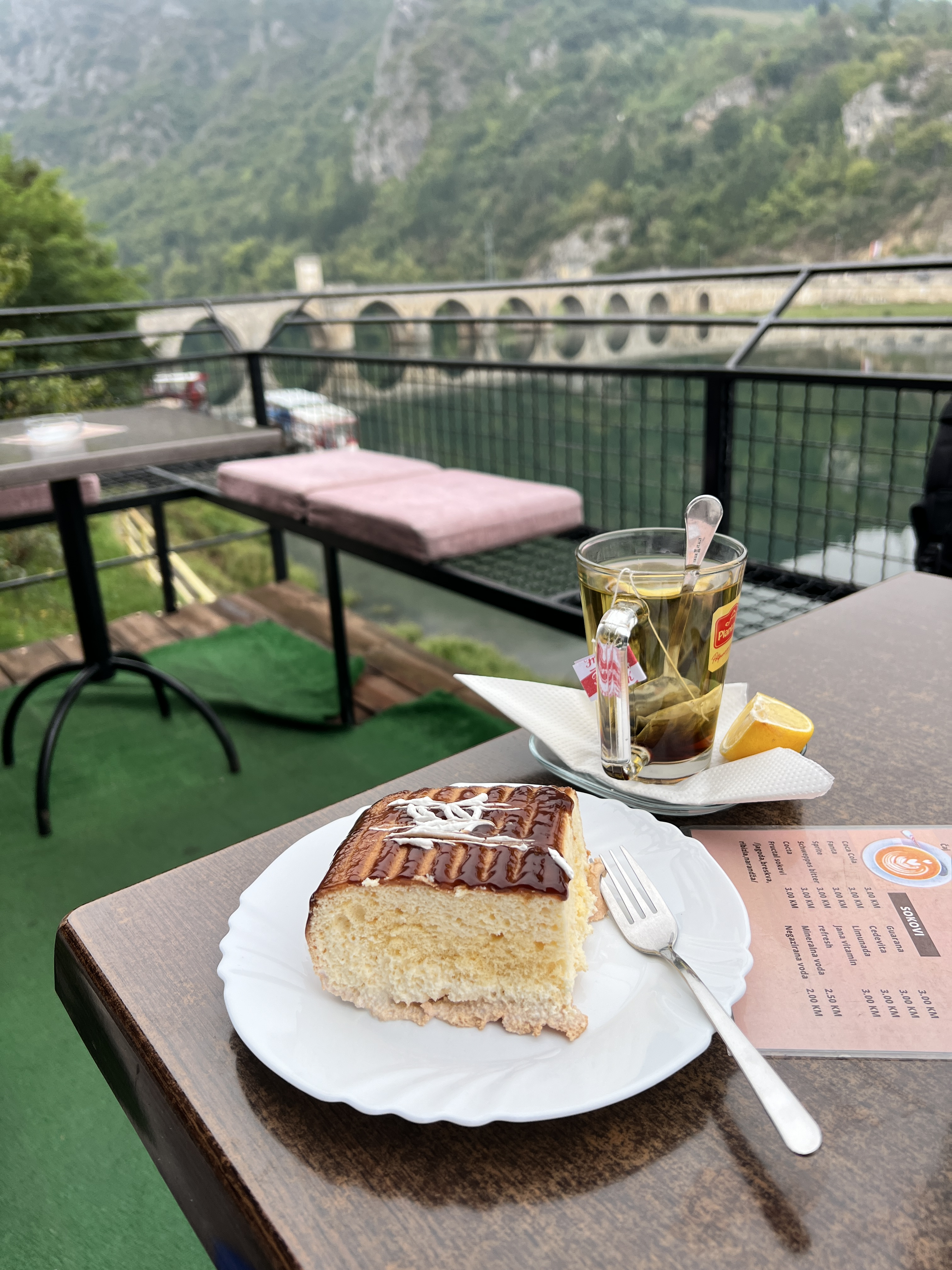
Trileće in Višegrad (Bosnia and Herzegovina).

A variation of tres leches known as trileche, trileče, trileće, or trileçe has become popular in Southeastern Europe, especially Albania and western Turkey. It is a caramel-topped version of tres leches, and it became popular in the Balkans and Turkey. One theory is that the popularity of Mexican soap operas in Albania led local chefs to reverse-engineer the dessert, which then spread to Turkey. Another theory is that Renata Casadei, an Italian chef at Piazza in Tirana, introduced it to Albania after visiting a friend in the Dominican Republic. The Albanian version is sometimes made literally with three milks: cow, goat, and water buffalo, though more commonly a mixture of cow's milk and cream is used. The Albanian variation trileçe usually has a caramel topping, while the tres leches cake is topped with whipped cream and fruit.

=== Ingredients ===
Tres leches cake consists of a standard cake base that is soaked in three kinds of milk ("tres leches" in Spanish). The milks used are evaporated, condensed, and whole milks. This mixture is poured over the baked sponge, allowing the milk to be absorbed to make a dessert with an almost pudding-like consistency. The cake is then topped with whipped cream. It can also be adorned with strawberries, blueberries, fruit drizzle, and cinnamon. The cake base of a tres leches cake can be made from scratch or by using a store-bought mix.

==== Turkish variation ====
Traditionally in Turkish cuisine, on top of the moist milk cake base, trileçe is topped off with a light, airy whipped cream with another layer of buttery caramel sauce and decorated with some fine lines of the whipped cream mixture. A toothpick or other pointed utensil is used to make the iconic design on the top.

== See also ==
- Albanian cuisine
- Latin American cuisine
- Mexican cuisine
- Nicaraguan cuisine
- Turkish cuisine
