= Lakror =

Albanian pie

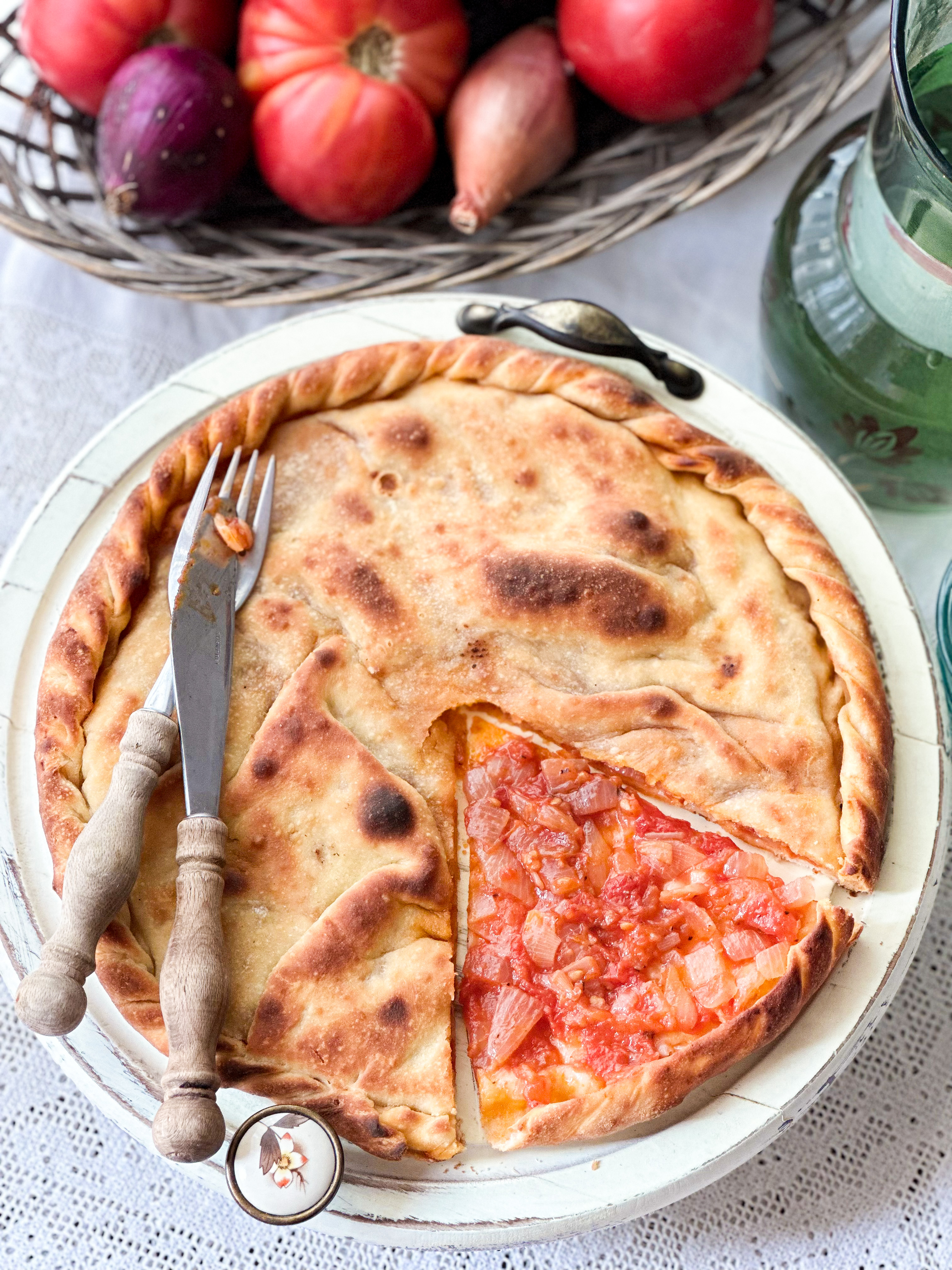
- Type: pastry (pie)
- Place of origin: Albania
- Region or state: Korçë region, Pogradec region, Devoll region (Albania); Bitola and Lake Prespa regions (North Macedonia)
- Main ingredients: flour, oil, lamb, beef, ricotta, feta, cabbage, nettle, spinach, orache, squash, leek, sorrel, tomato, pepper, eggs, milk

Lakror (Gheg Albanian: Laknor, Arbëreshë Albanian: Lakruar) is a traditional and common regional Albanian pie dish of Albania made with different fillings consisting of various vegetables or meat.

This traditional pie dish is also found among Albanian communities of southern Italy (Arbëreshë). Korçë and its surrounding areas have preserved a particular tradition of the lakror, considered a specialty by local Albanians. The pie is made in some other parts of southern Albania. Lakror is also consumed by Albanian communities in south-western North Macedonia, and by Albanians abroad or in the diaspora in places like the US and Australia. The pie is sometimes called a type of byrek pastry or compared to an American pie.

== Etymology ==
The term lakror is derived from the Albanian word lakër (cabbage, leafy vegetable). The vegetable was probably the original foundation of the pastry dish.

== Preparation ==
Traditionally Albanian women have been involved in preparing lakror.

The preparation of lakror is a hands on process that involves working and rolling the filo dough into thin layers, later opening the pastry and placing it in a tin, or pan. The gjellë (filling) is prepared separately by boiling minced vegetables. A variety of fillings can be made from different vegetables such as cabbage, nettle, spinach, orache, squash, or those with a strong flavour like onions and leeks. Other fillings are made from meat such as beef, lamb or involve combining ingredients like tomato and onion, tomato and pepper, spinach with cheese or with eggs, milk and (olive) oil. Sizable portions of gjellë is added to the pastry.

Apart from traditional lakror, there are other variations such as brushtul lakror made from eggs, butter and a filling with feta and cottage cheese.

Among Orthodox Albanians, Lakror is also made for commemorating St. Basil's day. In some Arbëreshë (Italo-Albanian) communities of southern Italy, the dish is called lakruar and prepared with a filling of cheese, chicken, mixed pork and sheep meat and cinnamon.

Organised by the Korçë municipality, an annual Lakror Festival (Albanian: Festa e Lakrorit) is held in Korçë or sometimes in a village of the wider area. As a celebration of summer and Albanian cuisine, the festival is attended by locals and tourists. Many lakrors are prepared and then baked in a Saç, a cooking utensil that is covered atop with hot embers.

== See also ==
- Albanian cuisine
