= Trileçe =

Dessert from the Balkans

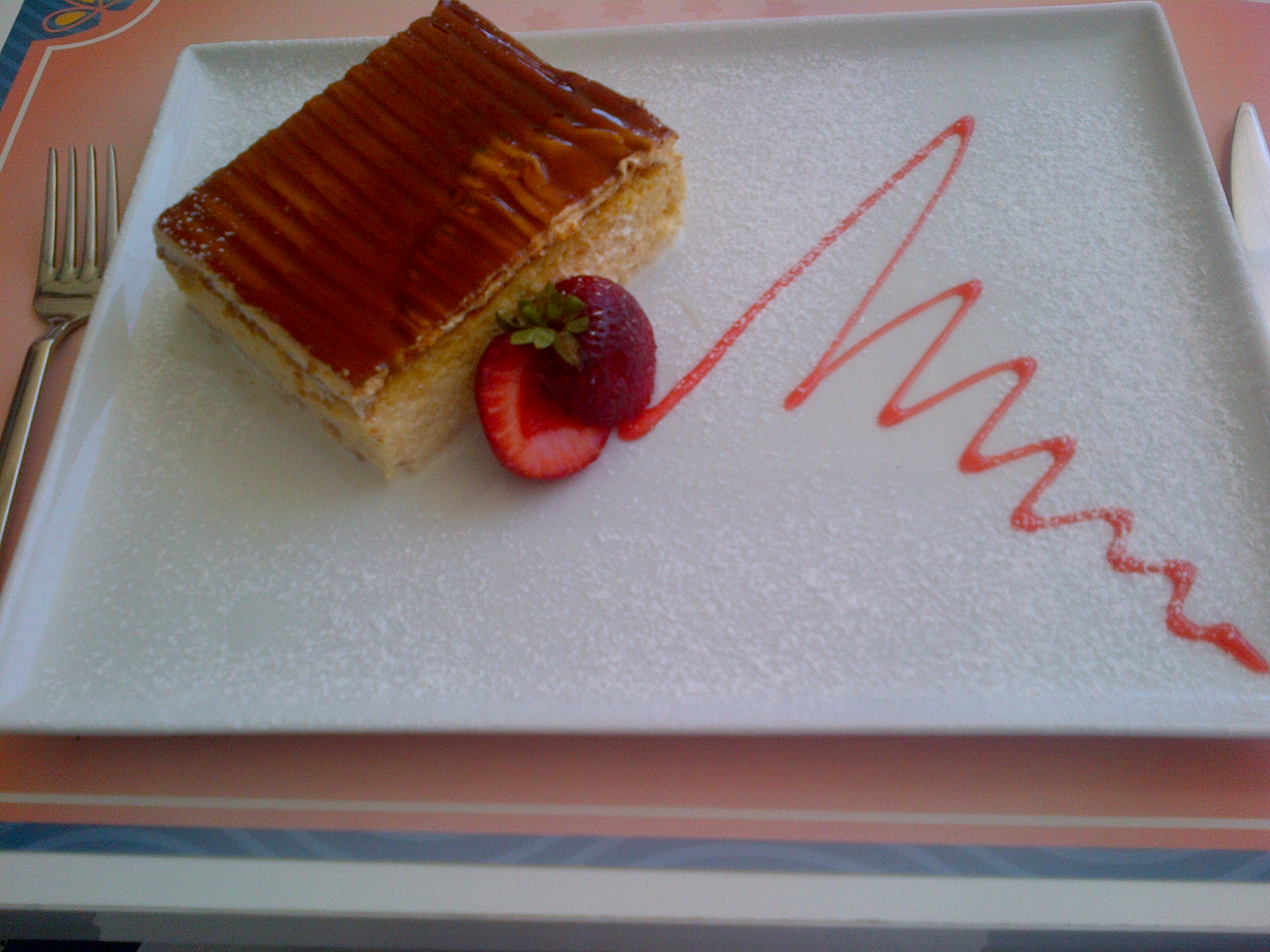
- Turkish version of Trileçe
- Type: Cake
- Course: Dessert
- Region or state: Balkans
- Main ingredients: 3 different types of milk
- Ingredients generally used: Caramel

Trileçe (Albanian: Trileçe or Tortë me qumësh, Albanian gheg: Trileçe, Serbo-Croatian: Trileće) is a popular dessert in Southeastern Europe, particularly in Albania, Turkey, Bosnia & Herzegovina, Serbia and Kosovo and other Balkan countries. It consists of a light sponge cake soaked in a mixture of three types of milk (evaporated milk, condensed milk and whole milk), which gives it its name—derived from the Spanish tres leches (three milks), a dessert popular in Latin America. Trileçe tends to have a caramel topping. Trileçe tends to be lighter than tres leches, due primarily to differences in milks used.

== Origin and spread ==
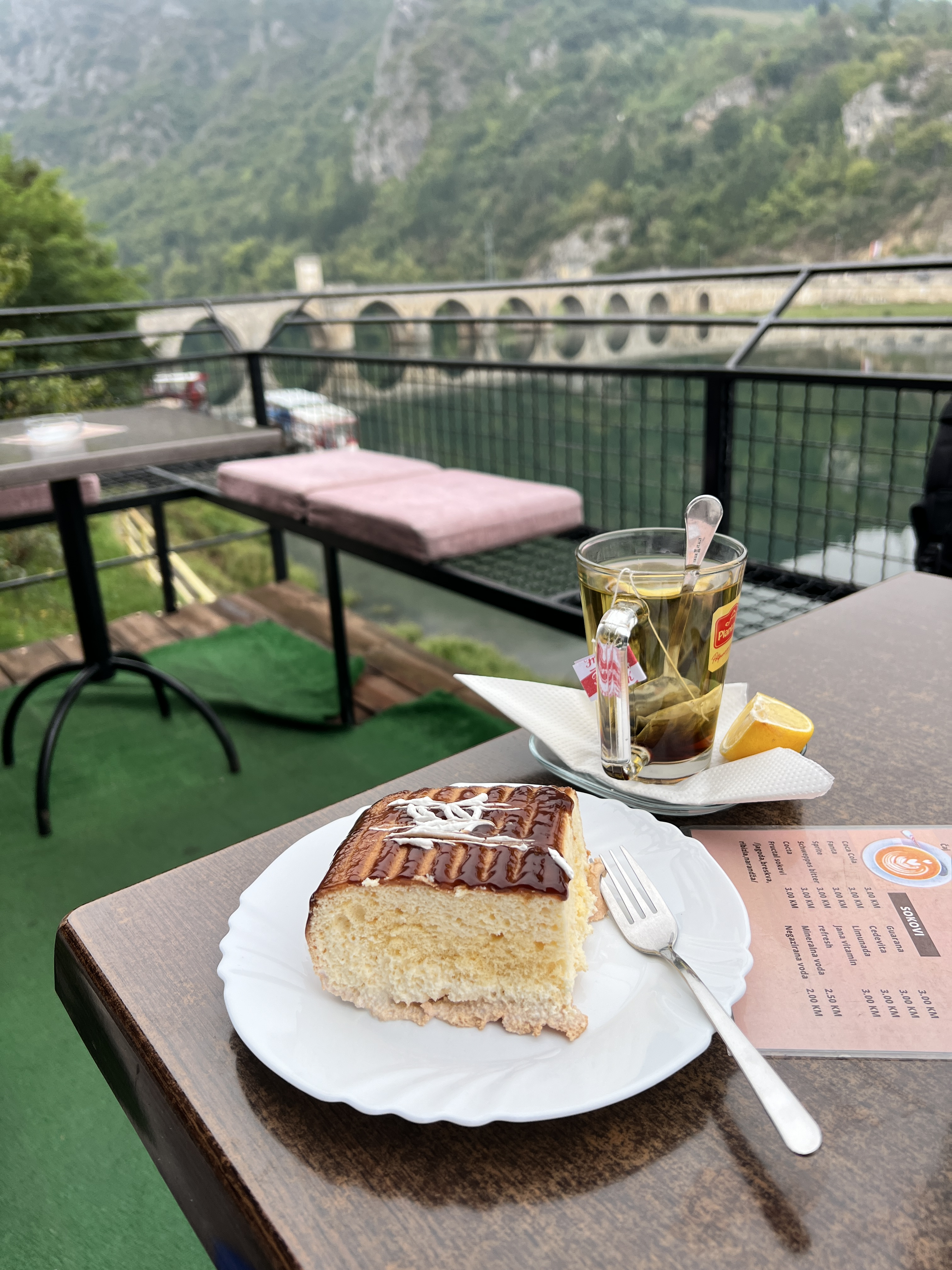
Bosnian version of the trilece cake with a caramel topping in Bosnia and Herzegovina

The exact origins of trileçe are debated. One theory posits that the popularity of Latin American soap operas in Albania led local chefs to reverse-engineer the tres leches cake, which then spread to Turkey, Bosnia and Herzegovina and throughout the Balkans. Another theory was the packaging of condensed milk in the 1940s showcasing recipes for tres leches. There is also the theory that Renata Casadei, an Italian chef at Piazza in Tirana, introduced it to Albania in the early 2000s after visiting a friend in the Dominican Republic.

Trileçe later spread from Turkey to parts of the Arab world.

Given its cross-cultural influences, Trileçe is frequently classified as fusion cuisine.

== Regional variations ==
The Albanian version is sometimes made literally with three types of milk: cow, goat, and water buffalo. However, more commonly in modern versions, a mixture of cow's milk and cream is used.

While tres leches is typically topped with cream and fruit, the Balkan variation, trileçe, usually features a caramel or fruit sauce topping, although sometimes cream is added before the caramel.

In Istanbul, where condensed milk is less popular, some versions use cow, sheep and goat milks as the 3 milks required by the recipe.

== Ingredients ==
Trileçe consists of a standard cake base that is soaked in three kinds of milk ("tres leches"in Spanish). The milks used are evaporated, condensed, and whole milks. This mixture is poured over the baked sponge, allowing the milks to be absorbed to make a dessert with an almost pudding-like consistency. The cake is then topped with caramel or a whipped cream. It can also be topped with strawberries, blueberries, fruit drizzle and cinnamon.

== See also ==
- Albanian cuisine
- Crème caramel
- Crème brûlée
- Latin American cuisine
- Mexican cuisine
