= Kabuni =

Albanian desert

- Type: Dessert
- Place of origin: Albania
- Region or state: Kruje
- Serving temperature: Cold
- Main ingredients: Rice, butter, mutton broth, raisins, sugar, cinnamon, cloves

Kabuni is a traditional Albanian dessert. It is made of rice fried in butter, mutton broth (ram's neck only), raisins (rinsed first in warm water), and some salt. It is then boiled before sugar, cinnamon, and ground cloves are added.

== See also ==
- List of desserts
- Halva
