= Albania in the Eurovision Song Contest 2025 =

- Eurovision Song Contest 2025
- Participating broadcaster: Radio Televizioni Shqiptar (RTSH)
- Country: Albania
- Selection process: Festivali i Këngës 63
- Selection date: 22 December 2024

Competing entry
- Song: "Zjerm"
- Artist: Shkodra Elektronike
- Songwriters: Beatriçe Gjergji; Kolë Laca; Lekë Gjeloshi

Placement
- Semi-final result: Qualified (2nd, 122 points)
- Final result: 8th, 218 points

Participation chronology

Albania was represented at the Eurovision Song Contest 2025 with the song "Zjerm", written by Beatriçe Gjergji, Kolë Laca, and Lekë Gjeloshi, and performed by Gjergji and Laca as Shkodra Elektronike. The Albanian participating broadcaster, Radio Televizioni Shqiptar (RTSH), selected its entry through its traditional national selection competition. Festivali i Këngës.

Albania was drawn to compete in the first semi-final of the Eurovision Song Contest which took place on 13 May 2025 and was later selected to perform in position 12. At the end of the show, " Zjerm" was announced among the top 10 entries of the first semi-final and hence qualified to compete in the final. It was later revealed that Albania placed second out of the fifteen participating countries in the semi-final with 122 points. In the final, Albania closed the show in position 26 and placed eighth out of the 26 participating, scoring a total of 218 points. This marked Albania's highest point total since its debut.

== Background ==
Prior to the 2025 contest, Radio Televizioni Shqiptar (RTSH) had participated in the Eurovision Song Contest representing Albania 20 times since its first entry in 2004. Its highest placing in the contest, to this point, had been the fifth place, which was achieved in 2012 with the song "Suus" performed by Rona Nishliu. It accomplished its second-highest placing when first participating in 2004, with the song "The Image of You" performed by Anjeza Shahini, finishing in seventh place. During its tenure in the contest, it failed to qualify for the final eight times. In 2024, it failed to qualify for the final, ultimately placing fifteenth in the semi-final with the song "Titan" performed by Besa.

As part of its duties as participating broadcaster, RTSH broadcasts the event in the country and organises Festivali i Këngës, an annual music competition which has been consistently used as its national selection format for the contest since its 2004 debut. On 30 September 2024, RTSH confirmed its intention to participate in the 2025 contest, and that Festivali i Këngës would select its entry.

== Before Eurovision ==
=== Festivali i Këngës 63 ===
The Albanian representative in the Eurovision Song Contest 2025 was selected during the 63rd edition of Festivali i Këngës, an annual music competition in Albania organised by RTSH at the Palace of Congresses in Tirana. The event took place between 19 and 22 December 2024 and was hosted by Enkel Demi and Ornela Bregu. The festival featured one category, which also selected Albania's entry for Eurovision. The broadcaster opened an application period for interested artists and composers to submit their applications on 27 September 2024, lasting until 29 September 2024, and ultimately selected 30 contestants. After the entries were announced, Olsi Bylyku withdrew, but Klea Dina was designated as his replacement. The jury selected 15 finalists, with the final result determined by a combination of votes from a professional jury, votes from abroad cast through an online platform (entitled the "diaspora's votes") and SMS voting in Albania and Kosovo.

==== Final ====
The grand final of Festivali i Këngës was held on 22 December 2024. Shkodra Elektronike with "Zjerm" emerged as the winner and was thus chosen as the Albanian representative for the Eurovision Song Contest 2025.

| R/O | Artist | Song | Jury | Public vote | | Total | Place |
| R/O | Artist | Song | Jury | Online | SMS | Total | Place |
|---|---|---|---|---|---|---|---|
| 1 | Jet | "Gjallë" | 10 | 0 | 1 | 11 | 9 |
| 2 | Kejsi Jazxhi | "Kur bota hesht" | 5 | 0 | 0 | 5 | 12 |
| 3 | Vesa Smolica | "Lutem" | 51 | 0 | 3 | 54 | 4 |
| 4 | Stine | "E kishim nis" | 0 | 0 | 0 | 0 | 15 |
| 5 | Djemtë e Detit | "Larg" | 35 | 0 | 2 | 37 | 6 |
| 6 | Nita Latifi | "Zemrës" | 1 | 0 | 0 | 1 | 14 |
| 7 | Gjergj Kaçinari | "Larg jetës pa ty" | 11 | 0 | 0 | 11 | 9 |
| 8 | Orgesa Zaimi | "I parë" | 20 | 0 | 1 | 21 | 8 |
| 9 | Ardit Çuni | "Amane" | 22 | 2 | 2 | 26 | 7 |
| 10 | Algert Sala | "Bosh" | 7 | 0 | 0 | 7 | 11 |
| 11 | Shkodra Elektronike | "Zjerm" | 78 | 23 | 42 | 143 | 1 |
| 12 | Lorenc Hasrama | "Frymë" | 36 | 1 | 4 | 41 | 5 |
| 13 | Elvana Gjata | "Karnaval" | 74 | 42 | 19 | 135 | 2 |
| 14 | Mal Retkoceri | "Antihero" | 4 | 1 | 0 | 5 | 12 |
| 15 | Alis Kallaçi | "Mjegull" | 52 | 1 | 6 | 59 | 3 |

== At Eurovision ==
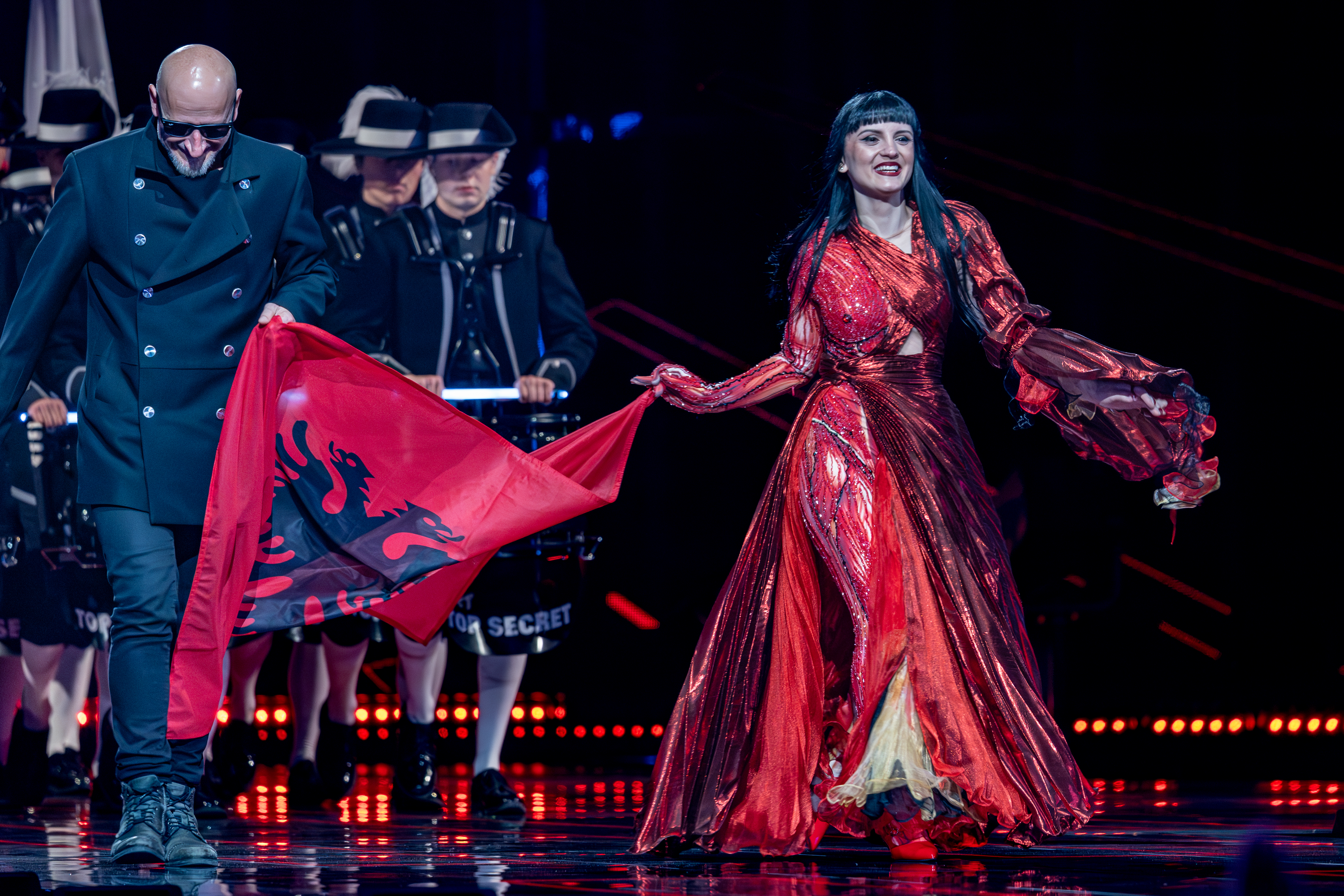
Shkodra Elektronike during the flag parade of the final on 17 May 2025.

The Eurovision Song Contest 2025 took place at the St. Jakobshalle in Basel, Switzerland, and consisted of two semi-finals held on the respective dates of 13 and 15 May and the final on 17 May 2025. All nations with the exceptions of the host country and the "Big Five" (France, Germany, Italy, Spain and the United Kingdom) were required to qualify from one of two semi-finals in order to compete in the final; the top ten countries from each semi-final progressed to the final. On 28 January 2025, an allocation draw was held to determine which of the two semi-finals, as well as which half of the show, each country would perform in; the EBU split up the competing countries into different pots based on voting patterns from previous contests, with countries with favourable voting histories put into the same pot. Albania was scheduled for the second half of the first semi-final. The shows' producers then decided the running order for the semi-finals; Albania was set to perform in position 12.

In Albania, all shows were broadcast on RTSH 1, RTSH Muzikë and Radio Tirana, with commentary provided by Andri Xhahu live from Tirana.

=== Semi-final ===
Albania performed in position 12, following the entry from San Marino and before the entry from the Netherlands. At the end of the show, the country was announced as a qualifier for the final. It was later revealed that Albania placed second out of the fifteen participating countries in the first semi-final with 122 points, matching its highest ever placing in a semi-final, which was previously achieved in 2012.

=== Final ===
Following the semi-final, Albania was drawn to perform in the second half of the final. The country was later chosen by producers to close the show in position 26, following the entry from San Marino. Shkodra Elektronike once again took part in dress rehearsals on 16 and 17 May before the final, including the jury final where the professional juries cast their final votes before the live show on 16 May. The duo performed a repeat of their semi-final performance during the final on 17 May. Albania placed 8th in the final, scoring 218 points; 173 points from the public televoting and 45 points from the juries. This marked the most points ever scored by an Albanian entry in the contest.

=== Voting ===
Below is a breakdown of points awarded by and to Albania in the first semi-final and in the final. Voting during the three shows involved each country awarding sets of points from 1-8, 10 and 12: one from their professional jury and the other from televoting in the final vote, while the semi-final vote was based entirely on the vote of the public. The Albanian jury consisted of Alfred Kaçinari, Shpëtim Saraçi, Ylljet Aliçka, Blerta Ristani and Mikaela Minga. In the first semi-final, Albania placed 2nd with 122 points, receiving maximum twelve points from the Rest of the World vote. In the final, Albania placed eighth with 218 points, receiving maximum twelve points in the jury vote from France and twelve points in the televote from Greece and Montenegro. This marked the most points ever scored by an Albanian entry in the contest. Over the course of the contest, Albania awarded its 12 points to Cyprus in the first semi-final, and to France (jury) and Greece (televote) in the final.

RTSH appointed Andri Xhahu as its spokesperson to announce the Albanian jury's votes in the final, marking the thirteenth consecutive contest in which Xhahu served as both commentator and spokesperson.

==== Points awarded to Albania ====
Points awarded to Albania (Semi-final 1)
| Score | Televote |
|---|---|
| 12 points | Rest of the World |
| 10 points | Croatia; Italy; Poland; Sweden; Switzerland; Ukraine |
| 8 points | Portugal |
| 7 points | Belgium; Slovenia |
| 6 points | Azerbaijan; Spain |
| 5 points | |
| 4 points | Netherlands; Norway |
| 3 points | Cyprus |
| 2 points | Estonia; Iceland |
| 1 point | San Marino (Note: San Marino uses a jury in the semi-finals.) |

Points awarded to Albania (Final)
| Score | Televote | Jury |
|---|---|---|
| 12 points | Greece; Montenegro | France |
| 10 points | Croatia; France; Italy; Rest of the World; Switzerland | Montenegro |
| 8 points | Germany; San Marino; Slovenia | |
| 7 points | Azerbaijan; Belgium; Luxembourg; Sweden | |
| 6 points | Austria | |
| 5 points | Czechia; United Kingdom | Poland |
| 4 points | Australia; Finland; Malta; Poland; Serbia | Cyprus; Portugal |
| 3 points | Armenia; Georgia; Spain | Italy; Sweden |
| 2 points | Portugal | Greece |
| 1 point | | Netherlands; Spain |

==== Points awarded by Albania ====
Points awarded by Albania (Semi-final 1)
| Score | Televote |
|---|---|
| 12 points | Cyprus |
| 10 points | Ukraine |
| 8 points | Estonia |
| 7 points | Netherlands |
| 6 points | Sweden |
| 5 points | Iceland |
| 4 points | San Marino |
| 3 points | Norway |
| 2 points | Poland |
| 1 point | Slovenia |

Points awarded by Albania (Final)
| Score | Televote | Jury |
|---|---|---|
| 12 points | Greece | France |
| 10 points | Italy | Spain |
| 8 points | Luxembourg | Switzerland |
| 7 points | Israel | Austria |
| 6 points | Austria | Greece |
| 5 points | Estonia | Israel |
| 4 points | Germany | Sweden |
| 3 points | San Marino | Netherlands |
| 2 points | Sweden | San Marino |
| 1 point | Netherlands | Portugal |

==== Detailed voting results ====
Each participating broadcaster assembles a five-member jury panel consisting of music industry professionals who are citizens of the country they represent. Each jury, and individual jury member, is required to meet a strict set of criteria regarding professional background, as well as diversity in gender and age. No member of a national jury was permitted to be related in any way to any of the competing acts in such a way that they cannot vote impartially and independently. The individual rankings of each jury member as well as the nation's televoting results were released shortly after the grand final.

The following members comprised the Albanian jury:

- Alfred Kaçinari
- Shpëtim Saraçi
- Ylljet Aliçka
- Blerta Ristani
- Mikaela Minga

Detailed voting results from Albania (Semi-final 1)
| R/O | Country | Televote | |
| R/O | Country | Rank | Points |
|---|---|---|---|
| 01 | Iceland | 6 | 5 |
| 02 | Poland | 9 | 2 |
| 03 | Slovenia | 10 | 1 |
| 04 | Estonia | 3 | 8 |
| 05 | Ukraine | 2 | 10 |
| 06 | Sweden | 5 | 6 |
| 07 | Portugal | 12 | |
| 08 | Norway | 8 | 3 |
| 09 | Belgium | 13 | |
| 10 | Azerbaijan | 14 | |
| 11 | San Marino | 7 | 4 |
| 12 | Albania | | |
| 13 | Netherlands | 4 | 7 |
| 14 | Croatia | 11 | |
| 15 | Cyprus | 1 | 12 |

Detailed voting results from Albania (Final)
| R/O | Country | Jury | | | | | | | Televote | |
| R/O | Country | Juror A | Juror B | Juror C | Juror D | Juror E | Rank | Points | Rank | Points |
|---|---|---|---|---|---|---|---|---|---|---|
| 01 | Norway | 24 | 15 | 13 | 20 | 21 | 20 | | 12 | |
| 02 | Luxembourg | 6 | 8 | 20 | 22 | 16 | 16 | | 3 | 8 |
| 03 | Estonia | 11 | 14 | 23 | 18 | 25 | 18 | | 6 | 5 |
| 04 | Israel | 2 | 3 | 8 | 8 | 12 | 6 | 5 | 4 | 7 |
| 05 | Lithuania | 16 | 25 | 24 | 25 | 15 | 24 | | 17 | |
| 06 | Spain | 5 | 2 | 5 | 7 | 4 | 2 | 10 | 21 | |
| 07 | Ukraine | 19 | 21 | 21 | 12 | 18 | 19 | | 14 | |
| 08 | United Kingdom | 21 | 9 | 12 | 5 | 17 | 15 | | 25 | |
| 09 | Austria | 1 | 4 | 4 | 11 | 14 | 4 | 7 | 5 | 6 |
| 10 | Iceland | 23 | 17 | 19 | 23 | 13 | 22 | | 15 | |
| 11 | Latvia | 20 | 19 | 14 | 17 | 1 | 11 | | 19 | |
| 12 | Netherlands | 8 | 10 | 7 | 4 | 10 | 8 | 3 | 10 | 1 |
| 13 | Finland | 18 | 24 | 22 | 24 | 11 | 21 | | 13 | |
| 14 | Italy | 13 | 16 | 10 | 9 | 5 | 13 | | 2 | 10 |
| 15 | Poland | 14 | 23 | 25 | 19 | 24 | 25 | | 16 | |
| 16 | Germany | 22 | 20 | 2 | 21 | 8 | 12 | | 7 | 4 |
| 17 | Greece | 3 | 5 | 9 | 3 | 9 | 5 | 6 | 1 | 12 |
| 18 | Armenia | 17 | 13 | 11 | 16 | 22 | 17 | | 18 | |
| 19 | Switzerland | 4 | 6 | 18 | 1 | 6 | 3 | 8 | 20 | |
| 20 | Malta | 25 | 22 | 16 | 15 | 23 | 23 | | 22 | |
| 21 | Portugal | 7 | 18 | 15 | 14 | 2 | 10 | 1 | 23 | |
| 22 | Denmark | 15 | 7 | 6 | 10 | 19 | 14 | | 24 | |
| 23 | Sweden | 10 | 12 | 1 | 13 | 7 | 7 | 4 | 9 | 2 |
| 24 | France | 9 | 1 | 3 | 2 | 20 | 1 | 12 | 11 | |
| 25 | San Marino | 12 | 11 | 17 | 6 | 3 | 9 | 2 | 8 | 3 |
| 26 | Albania | | | | | | | | | |
