= Festivali i Këngës 64 =

64th edition of Festivali i Këngës

Dates and venue
- Semi-final 1: 17 December 2025
- Semi-final 2: 18 December 2025
- Semi-final 3: 19 December 2025 (Nostalgia night)
- Final: 20 December 2025
- Venue: Palace of Congresses; Tirana, Albania

Production
- Host broadcaster: Radio Televizioni Shqiptar (RTSH)
- Executive producer: Belioza Çoku
- Artistic director: Elhaida Dani
- Presenters: Arilena Ara; Salsano Rrapi

Participants
- Number of entries: 28 (Note: Including 18 established artists and 10 newcomers)
- Number of finalists: 23

Vote
- Voting system: Semi-finals: jury votes; Final: 50/50 combination of televote and jury votes
- Winning song: "Nân" by Alis

Festivali i Këngës 64 was the 64th edition of the annual Albanian music competition Festivali i Këngës, organised by Radio Televizioni Shqiptar (RTSH). It was held between 17 and 20 December 2025 at the Palace of Congresses in Tirana and was hosted by Arilena Ara and Salsano Rrapi. The winner of the competition, Alis with "Nân", represented Albania in the Eurovision Song Contest 2026.

== Format ==
The 64th edition of Festivali i Këngës consisted of two semi-finals on 17 and 18 December 2025, a "nostalgia night" on 19 December 2025 and the final on 20 December 2025.

In July 2025, it was announced that Elhaida Dani – who won Festivali i Këngës 53 – would serve as the artistic director, repeating her function from the previous edition, where she was widely credited with enhancing the quality of the shows. Belioza Çoku was announced as the executive producer in October 2025, while Arilena Ara – who won Festivali i Këngës 58 – and comedian Salsano Rrapi were named the hosts in December 2025.

Broadcasters Andri Xhahu and Antoneta Koçi hosted a special Post Festivali broadcast after each of the shows.

=== Voting structure ===
A seven-member jury voted to determine the five newcomers advancing to the final from the qualifying phase, announced at the end of the third night, as well as half of the result of the final, with the remaining half decided by the televote, which also accepted votes from Kosovo. A worldwide online vote officially designated as the "diaspora vote" was originally planned to complement the domestic televote for the second year in a row, but was withheld on the first day of the festival in order to "guarantee transparency".

The members of the jury were Anila Basha, Belinda Budini, Bleona Qereti, Olen Çezari, Rame Lahaj, Valentin Veizi and Zef Çoba.

== Contestants ==
RTSH opened an application period for interested artists and composers on 1 September 2025, with applications open until 30 September; as a novelty, songs created with the assistance of generative artificial intelligence were immediately discarded in order to "preserve the authenticity" of the festival. A total of 28 artists appeared on the list of selected competing acts, which was published on 13 October. On 22 November, Egzon Pireci announced his withdrawal from the contest due to "personal reasons"; Lynx was designated as his replacement and announced as a competitor three days later. The genres and titles of the entries were revealed in batches between 21 and 28 October, with the songs eventually released on 1 December.

Key: Withdrawn Replacement entry

Festivali i Këngës 64 established artists
Artist	Song	Songwriter(s)
2 Farm	"Valle mbi hi"	2 Farm
Alis	"Nân"	Alis Kallaçi; Desara Gjini
Egzon Piereci	"Thirrëm"	Aida Baraku; Armend Rexhepagiqi; Nexhat Mujovi; Wirusi
Enxhi Nasufi	"Dritë"	Enxhi Nasufi; Kledi Bahiti
Erik Lloshi	"Dy pika dashuri"	Erik Lloshi; Flamur Shehu
Evi Reçi	"Kodi i jetës"	Enis Mullaj; Eriona Rushiti
Fifi and Tiri Gjoci	"Rri"	Filloreta Raçi; Tiri Gjoci
Frensi	"Tresh"	Inis Neziri; Panda
Gerta Mahmutaj	"Në krahët e tu"	Gerta Mahmutaj; Kledi Bahiti; Petro Xhori
Gresa Gjocera and Bledi Kaso	"Busulla e zemrës"	Jeris Kaso; Pandi Laço
Inis Neziri	"Ta kam fal"	EngliVersal; Inis Neziri; Ledio Dara
Kamela Islamaj	"Pa pretendime"	Gjergj Kaçinari; Megi Hasani
Kleansa Susaj	"Hije"	Aldo Marku; Kleansa Susaj
Luna Çausholli	"Pa kufij"	Ermira Çausholli; Kledi Bahiti; Luna Çausholli
Lorenc Hasrama	"Lamtumirë"	Erjon Lleshi; Lorenc Hasrama
Lynx	"Nuk kthehem pas"	Lynx
Rezarta Smaja	"Balukeprera"	Sokol Marsi
Sara Kapo	"Të dua shumë"	Sara Kapo; Tomorr Kuçi
Vedat Ademi	"Kur fjala mbaron"	Afërdita Saracini Kelmendi; Xhevdet Gashi

Festivali i Këngës 64 newcomers
Artist	Song	Songwriter(s)
Endri Kaçaçi	"Si unë"	Endri Kaçaçi; Irkenc Hyka
Erand Sojli	"Të kam në fron"	Erand Sojli
Ghiti	"Okej!"	Beatriçe Gjergji; Marcello Maria Batelli
Kimi	"Prap diell del"	Danny Kenny; Kimi; Skip
Malvina Likaj	"Përtej shpirtit"	Klodian Qafoku; Malvina Likaj
Rigersa Loka	"Albanian Heart"	Aidan Baraku; Darko Dimitrov
Savjana Vjerdha	"Dimër për dimër e vjeshtë për vjeshtë" (Note: Originally titled "ID")	Ilir Dangellia; Ilirian Zhupa
Sheila	"Zemra e tokës"	Marko Polo; Sheila Haxhiraj
Sihana Haxhnikaj	"Horizont"	Eriona Rushiti; Florent Boshnjaku
Threex	"Vite"	Marsel Gunga; Threex

== Shows ==
=== Semi-finals ===
The semi-finals took place on 17 and 18 December 2025 at 21:00 CET. Kroni Pula, who represented Albania in the Junior Eurovision Song Contest 2025, featured as a special guest in semi-final 1.

Key: Automatic Qualifier Qualifier

Semi-final 1 – 17 December 2025
R/O	Artist	Song
1	Rigersa Loka	"Albanian Heart"
2	Lorenc Hasrama	"Lamtumirë"
3	Sara Kapo	"Të dua shumë"
4	Sheila	"Zemra e tokës"
5	Kleansa Susaj	"Hije"
6	Gresa Gjocera and Bledi Kaso	"Busulla e zemrës"
7	Rezarta Smaja	"Balukeprera"
8	Ghiti	"Okej!"
9	Lynx	"Nuk kthehem pas"
10	Erand Sojli	"Të kam në fron"
11	Inis Neziri	"Ta kam fal"
12	Kimi	"Prapë dielli del"
13	Alis	"Nân"
14	Enxhi Nasufi	"Dritë"

Semi-final 2 – 18 December 2025
R/O	Artist	Song
1	Savjana Vjerdha	"Dimër për dimër e vjeshtë për vjeshtë"
2	2 Farm	"Valle mbi hi"
3	Gerta Mahmutaj	"Në krahët e tu"
4	Sihana Haxhnikaj	"Horizont"
5	Luna Çausholli	"Pa kufij"
6	Erik Lloshi	"Dy pika dashuri"
7	Frensi	"Tresh"
8	Malvina Likaj	"Përtej shpirtit"
9	Vedat Ademi	"Kur fjala mbaron"
10	Kamela Islamaj	"Pa pretendime"
11	Threex	"Vite"
12	Endri Kaçaçi	"Si unë"
13	Fifi and Tiri Gjoci	"Rri"
14	Evi Reçi	"Kodi i jetës"

=== Nostalgia night ===
The "nostalgia night" took place on 19 December 2025 at 21:00 CET. The 18 established artists performed songs from the history of Festivali i Këngës in duet with guest performers.

Nostalgia night – 19 December 2025
R/O	Artist	Guest artist	Song
1	Alis	Anxhela Peristeri	"Jon"
2	Sara Kapo	Eneda Tarifa	"Vajzat e fshatit tim"
3	Lynx	Altin Goci	"Me ty kaq pranë"
4	Rezarta Smaja	Sidrit Bejleri	"Lule të bukura sjell pranvera"
5	Luna Çausholli	Kelly	"Ende ka shpresë"
6	Kleansa Susaj	Gili	"Xixëllonjë"
7	Erik Lloshi	Mateus Frroku	"Djaloshi dhe shiu"
8	Gresa Gjocera and Bledi Kaso	Elton Deda	"Nuk kërkoj tjetër njeri"
9	Lorenc Hasrama	Vesa Luma	"Shiu"
10	Evi Reçi	Kastriot Tusha	"Këputa një gjethe dafine"
11	Enxhi Nasufi	Vikena Kamenica	"Flakë e borë"
12	Gerta Mahmutaj	Kleiti Mahmutaj	"Valsi i lumturisë"
13	Frensi	Rosela Gjylbegu	"Në moshën e rinisë"
14	2 Farm	Kozma Dushi	"Bardhësi"
15	Inis Neziri	Jonida Maliqi	"Jetoj"
16	Vedat Ademi	Teuta Kurti	"Ti nuk më meriton"
17	Kamela Islamaj	Orgesa Zaimi	"Sot jam 20 vjeç"
18	Fifi and Tiri Gjoci	Young Zerka	"Jehon"

=== Final ===
The final took place on 20 December 2025 at 21:00 CET. Tommy Cash, who represented Estonia in the Eurovision Song Contest 2025, featured as a special guest.

Final – 20 December 2025
R/O	Artist	Song	Jury	Televote	Total	Place
1	Gerta Mahmutaj	"Në krahët e tu"	0	7	7	16
2	Lynx	"Nuk kthehem pas"	0	0	0	20
3	Frensi	"Tresh"	22	0	22	11
4	Evi Reçi	"Kodi i jetës"	0	0	0	20
5	Rezarta Smaja	"Balukeprera"	15	0	15	13
6	Rigersa Loka	"Albanian Heart"	5	0	5	17
7	Vedat Ademi	"Kur fjala mbaron"	42	21	63	5
8	Erik Lloshi	"Dy pika dashuri"	4	0	4	18
9	Kleansa Susaj	"Hije"	0	0	0	20
10	Sara Kapo	"Të dua shumë"	6	49	55	6
11	Sheila	"Zemra e tokës"	65	28	93	3
12	Savjana Vjerdha	"Dimër për dimër e vjeshtë për vjeshtë"	11	0	11	14
13	2 Farm	"Valle mbi hi"	10	42	52	8
14	Kamela Islamaj	"Pa pretendime"	4	0	4	18
15	Gresa Gjocera and Bledi Kaso	"Busulla e zemrës"	0	0	0	20
16	Inis Neziri	"Ta kam fal"	32	70	102	2
17	Lorenc Hasrama	"Lamtumirë"	10	0	10	15
18	Endri Kaçaçi	"Si unë"	40	14	54	7
19	Luna Çausholli	"Pa kufij"	1	35	36	9
20	Alis	"Nân"	68	84	152	1
21	Ghiti	"Okej!"	17	0	17	12
22	Enxhi Nasufi	"Dritë"	25	0	25	10
23	Fifi and Tiri Gjoci	"Rri"	29	56	85	4

Detailed jury votes
R/O	Song	B. Budini	V. Veizi	A. Basha	Z. Çoba	O. Çezari	B. Qereti	R. Lahaj	Total
1	"Në krahët e tu"								0
2	"Nuk kthehem pas"								0
3	"Tresh"		4			10	8		22
4	"Kodi i jetës"								0
5	"Balukeprera"				8			7	15
6	"Albanian Heart"				2	3			5
7	"Kur fjala mbaron"	7	10	10	10			5	42
8	"Dy pika dashuri"						4		4
9	"Hije"								0
10	"Të dua shumë"					4	1	1	6
11	"Zemra e tokës"	10	6	8	7	12	12	10	65
12	"Dimër për dimër e vjeshtë për vjeshtë"			4	5			2	11
13	"Valle mbi hi"		1	7			2		10
14	"Pa pretendime"	3			1				4
15	"Busulla e zemrës"								0
16	"Ta kam fal"	8	5			6	7	6	32
17	"Lamtumirë"			6	4				10
18	"Si unë"	5	8	2	6	1	10	8	40
19	"Pa kufij"	1							1
20	"Nân"	12	12	12	12	8		12	68
21	"Okej!"	2	2	1	3	2	3	4	17
22	"Dritë"	4	3	5		5	5	3	25
23	"Rri"	6	7	3		7	6		29
