= Festivali i Këngës 63 =

63rd edition of Festivali i Këngës

Dates and venue
- Semi-final 1: 19 December 2024
- Semi-final 2: 20 December 2024
- Nostalgia night: 21 December 2024
- Final: 22 December 2024
- Venue: Palace of Congresses; Tirana, Albania

Production
- Broadcaster: Radio Televizioni Shqiptar (RTSH)
- Director: Redi Treni
- Artistic director: Elhaida Dani
- Festival Director: Aurora Polo
- Presenters: Enkel Demi; Ornela Bregu

Participants
- Number of entries: 30
- Number of finalists: 15

Vote
- Voting system: Semi-finals: 100% jury vote; Final: approx. 73% jury vote, 13% diaspora's votes, 14% SMS voting
- Winning song: "Zjerm" by Shkodra Elektronike

Festivali i Këngës 63 was the 63rd edition of the annual Albanian music competition Festivali i Këngës, organised by Radio Televizioni Shqiptar (RTSH). It was held between 19 and 22 December 2024 at the Palace of Congresses in Tirana, and it was hosted by Enkel Demi and Ornela Bregu. The winner was Shkodra Elektronike with "Zjerm", therefore becoming the contestant that represented Albania in the Eurovision Song Contest 2025.

== Format ==
The 63rd edition of Festivali i Këngës was organised by Radio Televizioni Shqiptar (RTSH) took place from 19 to 22 December 2024. The contest consisted of two semi-finals on 19 and 20 December, followed by a nostalgia night on 21 December and conclude in the grand final on 22 December. The four live shows were hosted by Enkel Demi and Ornela Bregu, and held at the Palace of Congresses in Tirana, Albania.

In June 2024, Albanian singer Elhaida Dani, who won the 53rd edition of Festivali i Këngës, was announced as the artistic director of the contest.

=== Voting ===
For the 63rd edition of Festivali i Këngës, a professional jury chaired by Zana Çela, with members Ylljet Aliçka, Alma Bektashi, Florent Boshnjaku, Jonida Maliqi, Merita Rexha Tërshana, and Ramona Tullumani, assessed 30 contestants over the two semi-finals. The jury selected the 15 finalists for the grand final, with the final result determined by both a jury and televoting. After the finalists were announced during the nostalgia night, voters from abroad were able to vote through an online platform, with the votes cast there being entitled the "diaspora's votes". In addition to the diaspora's votes, voters from Albania and Kosovo cast their votes via SMS, with each voter allowed to vote up to five times for their preferred artist's code. In the final, all 7 members of the jury awarded 12, 10 and 8–1 points to their 10 favourite songs, with SMS voting and online voting proportionally awarding 80 and 70 points, respectively.

== Contestants ==
RTSH initiated an application period for artists and composers interested in participating in the 63rd edition of Festivali i Këngës from 27 to 29 September 2024. At the closing of the submission period, 85 entries had been received. A total of 30 artists appeared on the provisional list of artists selected to compete in the festival, which was published on 7 October. The titles of their songs were revealed in batches between 21 October and 15 November.

On 19 November 2024, Olsi Bylyku announced his withdrawal from the contest. Klea Dina was designated as his replacement.

Key

Entry withdrawn Replacement entry

Artist	Song	Language	Songwriter(s)
Algert Sala	"Bosh"	Albanian	Algert Sala
Alis	"Mjegull"	Albanian	Alis Kallacej; Alban Kondi
Ardit Çuni	"Amane"	Albanian	Ardit Çuni; Stivi Ushe
Devis Xherahu	"Ka momente"	Albanian	Devis Xherahu; Ertemiona Mejdani; Marly & Santi
Djemtë e Detit	"Larg"	Albanian	Timo Flloko; Valentin Markvukaj
Elvana Gjata	"Karnaval"	Albanian, Spanish	Elvana Gjata; Lira Blakaj; Luisa Ionela Luca; Victor Bouroșu
Endrik Beba	"Ishe ti"	Albanian	Endrik Beba
Epos	"Kurajo dhe Zjarr"	Albanian	Algert Kashari
Erma Mici	"Mbaje"	Albanian	Kledi Bahiti; Erma Mici; Rozana Radi
Frensi Revania	"Rreziko"	Albanian	Frensi Revania; Alban Male
Gjergj Kaçinari	"Larg jetës pa ty"	Albanian	Gjergj Kaçinari
Gresa Gjocera	"E vërteta"	Albanian	Gresa Gjocera; Endrit Shani
Jet	"Gjallë"	Albanian	Elios Shuli; Inis Neziri
Kejsi Jazxhi	"Kur bota hesht"	Albanian	Sardi Strugaj; Briz Musaraj
Klea Dina	"Dashuri ndiej"	Albanian	Drenusha Zajmi; Klea Dina; Agron Dina
Kleansa Susaj	"Ta dija"	Albanian	Pejana Elezi; Kledi Bahiti; Kleansa Susaj
Laorjan Ejlli and Adelina Corraj	"A thu"	Albanian	Melita Vjerdha; Laorjan Ejlli
Lorenc Hasrama	"Frymë"	Albanian	Petro Xhori
Luna Çausholli	"Qiell apo ferr"	Albanian	Ermira Çausholli; Luna Çausholli
Mal	"Antihero"	Albanian	Mal Retkoceri
Martina Serreqi	"Nëse qaj"	Albanian	Sardi Strugaj
Mihallaq Andrea	"Porositë e babait"	Albanian	Ardiana Dragoj; Mihallaq Andrea
Nita Latifi	"Zemrës"	Albanian	Nita Latifi; Lorenc Hasrama
~~Olsi Bylyku~~	~~"Tupanët"~~	Unknown	~~Olsi Bylyku~~
Orgesa Zaimi	"I parë"	Albanian	Enis Mullaj; Eriona Rushiti
Rea Nuhu	"Sot"	Albanian	Rea Nuhu
Ronaldo Mesuli	"N'zemër"	Albanian	Ronaldo Mesuli
Santino de Bartolo	"Kur nata vjen si bora"	Albanian	Santino de Bartolo
Shkodra Elektronike	"Zjerm"	Albanian	Beatriçe Gjergji; Lekë Gjeloshi
Stine	"E kishim nis"	Albanian	Stine
Vesa Smolica	"Lutem"	Albanian	Eriona Rushiti

== Shows ==
=== Semi-finals ===
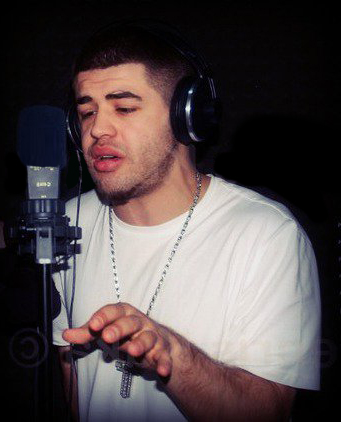
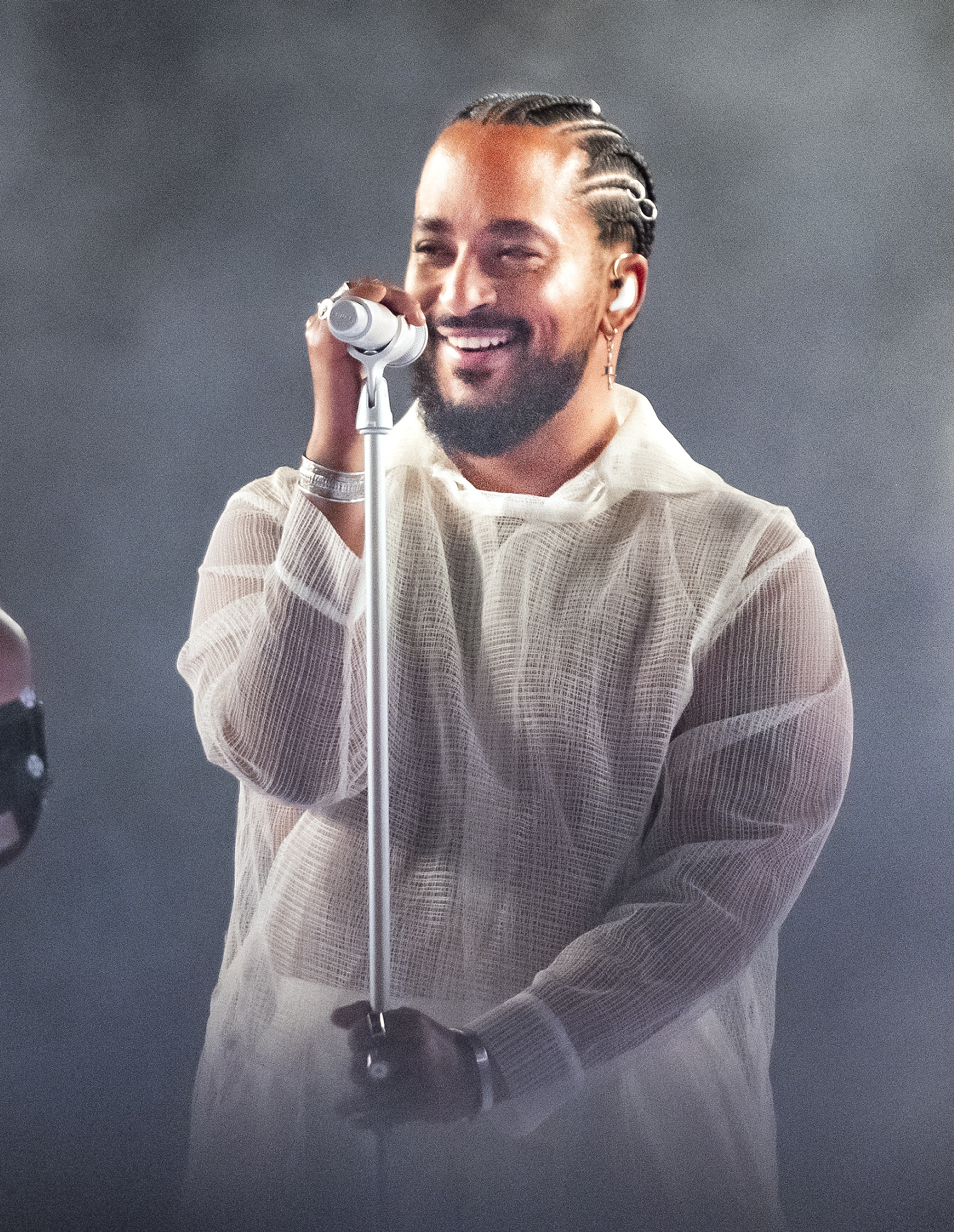
Albanian rapper Noizy (left) and French singer Slimane (right) were the special guests of the first semi-final Festivali i Këngës.

The semi-finals of Festivali i Këngës took place on 19 and 20 December 2024. The opening of the first semi-final was marked by a performance of the song "Fëmija e parë" by Albanian singer Vaçe Zela interpreted by Elhaida Dani and an accompanying children choir. Albanian rapper Noizy and French singer Slimane were the special guests of the first semi-final. Albanian dancer Klaudia Pepa and singer Aleksandër Gjoka were the special guests of the second semi-final. It further included a performance of K'cimi i Tropojës, which was recently inscribed on the UNESCO Intangible Cultural Heritage list for its cultural significance. 15 contestants competed in each semi-final, with 15 advancing to the grand final.

Key

Qualifier

Semi-final 1–19 December 2024
R/O	Artist	Song	Result
1	Orgesa Zaimi	"I parë"	Qualified
2	Erma Mici	"Mbaje"	—N/a
3	Luna Çausholli	"Qiell apo ferr"	—N/a
4	Ronaldo Mesuli	"N'zemër"	—N/a
5	Mihallaq Andrea	"Porositë e babait"	—N/a
6	Kejsi Jazxhi	"Kur bota hesht"	Qualified
7	Lorenc Hasrama	"Frymë"	Qualified
8	Jet	"Gjallë"	Qualified
9	Djemtë e Detit	"Larg"	Qualified
10	Nita Latifi	"Zemrës"	Qualified
11	Martina Serreqi	"Nëse qaj"	—N/a
12	Alis	"Mjegull"	Qualified
13	Shkodra Elektronike	"Zjerm"	Qualified
14	Kleansa Susaj	"Ta dija"	—N/a
15	Ardit Çuni	"Amane"	Qualified

Semi-final 2–20 December 2024
R/O	Artist(s)	Song	Result
1	Mal	"Antihero"	Qualified
2	Klea Dina	"Dashuri ndiej"	—N/a
3	Devis Xherahu	"Ka momente"	—N/a
4	Vesa Smolica	"Lutem"	Qualified
5	Algert Sala	"Bosh"	Qualified
6	Gresa Gjocera	"E vërteta"	—N/a
7	Frensi Revania	"Rreziko"	—N/a
8	Endrik Beba	"Ishe ti"	—N/a
9	Epos	"Kurajo dhe Zjarr"	—N/a
10	Laorjan Ejlli and Adelina Corraj	"A thu"	—N/a
11	Santino de Bartolo	"Kur nata vjen si bora"	—N/a
12	Rea Nuhu	"Sot"	—N/a
13	Elvana Gjata	"Karnaval"	Qualified
14	Stine	"E kishim nis"	Qualified
15	Gjergj Kaçinari	"Larg jetës pa ty"	Qualified

=== Nostalgia night ===
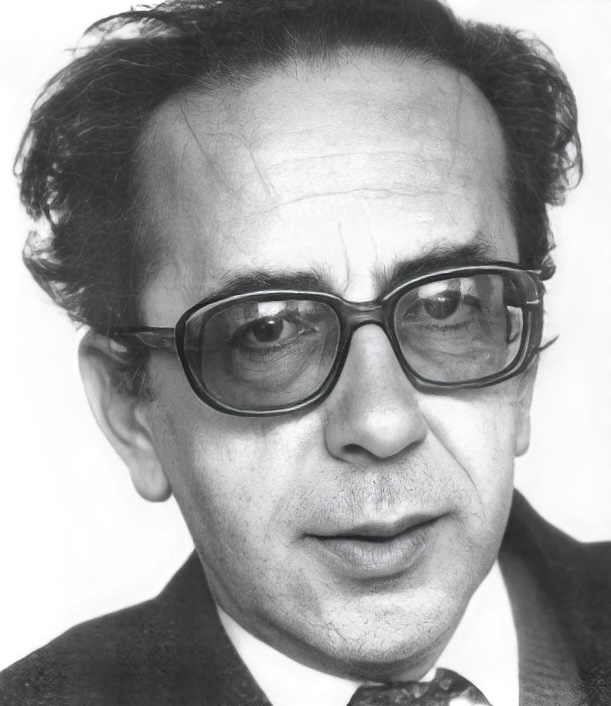
The poem "Mall" by Ismail Kadare (pictured) was performed during Nostalgia night.

The nostalgia night of Festivali i Këngës took place on 21 December 2024 at 21:00 CET. The show began with the poem "Mall" by internationally acclaimed Albanian poet Ismail Kadare, interpreted by actor Viktor Zhusti and accompanied by piano music performed by singer Redon Makashi. For the show, the contestants were paired up to perform songs that have competed in previous editions of the contest.

Nostalgia Night–21 December 2024
R/O	Artist(s)	Song
1	Martina Sereqi and Stine	"E rë pranverore"
2	Kejsi Jazxhi and Mihallaq Andrea	"Mora shoqezën përkrah"
3	Ardit Çuni and Frensi Revania	"Eja"
4	Elvana Gjata and Shkodra Elektronike	"Margjelo"
5	Gresa Gjocera and Ronaldo Mesuli	"Askush s’do ta besojë"
6	Santino de Bartolo and Djemtë e Detit	"Zemër e plagosur"
7	Luna Çausholli and Nita Latifi	"Udhëtoj i menduar"
8	Endrik Beba and Lorenc Hasrama	"Humba pranverën"
9	Jet, Laurjan Ejlli and Adelina Corraj	"Në çdo zemër një herë troket"
10	Klea Dina and Rea Nuhu	"Grurë dhe Këngë"
11	Gjergj Kaçinari and Kleansa Susaj	"Dëshirë dhe heshtje"
12	Alis and Erma Mici	"Suus"
13	Algert Sala and Vesa Smolica	"Mirësia dhe e vërteta"
14	Epos and Mal	"Jetoj"
15	Devis Xherahu and Orgesa Zaimi	"Shqipëri o vendi im"

=== Final ===
The grand final of Festivali i Këngës took place on 22 December 2024 at 21:00 (CET). Kosovo-Albanian rapper MC Kresha with the song "Era" opened the show of the grand final. Xhevdet Ferri's daughter and Arta Dade were featured with speaking roles during the grand final, while Elhaida Dani spoke and performed a song. Shkodra Elektronike won with the song "Zjerm", winning both the jury and the televoting. Elvana Gjata with the song "Karnaval" finished second, and Alis Kallaçi with the song "Mjegull" finished third. Additionally, "Zjerm" by Shkodra Elektronike received the Critic's Choice award, while "Lutem" by Vesa Smolica received the Best Lyrics award.

Grand Final–22 December 2024
R/O	Artist	Song	Jury	Televote		Total	Place
R/O	Artist	Song	Jury	Online	SMS	Total	Place
1	Jet	"Gjallë"	10	0	1	11	9
2	Kejsi Jazxhi	"Kur bota hesht"	5	0	0	5	12
3	Vesa Smolica	"Lutem"	51	0	3	54	4
4	Stine	"E kishim nis"	0	0	0	0	15
5	Djemtë e Detit	"Larg"	35	0	2	37	6
6	Nita Latifi	"Zemrës"	1	0	0	1	14
7	Gjergj Kaçinari	"Larg jetës pa ty"	11	0	0	11	9
8	Orgesa Zaimi	"I parë"	20	0	1	21	8
9	Ardit Çuni	"Amane"	22	2	2	26	7
10	Algert Sala	"Bosh"	7	0	0	7	11
11	Shkodra Elektronike	"Zjerm"	78	23	42	143	1
12	Lorenc Hasrama	"Frymë"	36	1	4	41	5
13	Elvana Gjata	"Karnaval"	74	42	19	135	2
14	Mal	"Antihero"	4	1	0	5	12
15	Alis	"Mjegull"	52	1	6	59	3

Detailed jury results
R/O	Song	R. Tullumani	M.R. Tërshana	Y. Aliçka	J. Maliqi	A. Bektashi	F. Boshnjaku	Z. Çela	Total
1	"Gjallë"	5	4					1	10
2	"Kur bota hesht"			5					5
3	"Lutem"	6	8	7	7	7	8	8	51
4	"E kishim nis"								0
5	"Larg"	1	5	8	6	5	6	4	35
6	"Zemrës"						1		1
7	"Larg jetës pa ty"			3	2	1	5		11
8	"I parë"	4	3	2	3	4	2	2	20
9	"Amane"	2	2	4	4	2	3	5	22
10	"Bosh"				1	3		3	7
11	"Zjerm"	10	12	12	12	12	10	10	78
12	"Frymë"	8	6	1	5	6	4	6	36
13	"Karnaval"	12	10	10	8	10	12	12	74
14	"Antihero"	3	1						4
15	"Mjegull"	7	7	6	10	8	7	7	52
