= Festivali i Këngës 62 =

62nd edition of Festivali i Këngës

Dates and venue
- Semi-final 1: 19 December 2023
- Semi-final 2: 20 December 2023
- Semi-final 3: 21 December 2023 (Nostalgia Night)
- Final: 22 December 2023
- Venue: Palace of Congresses, Tirana

Organisation
- Host broadcaster: Radio Televizioni Shqiptar (RTSH)
- Presenters: Adriana Matoshi; Kledi Kadiu; Krisa Çaushi; Xhuliano Dule

Participants
- Number of entries: 31

Vote
- Voting system: Jury selected the top three contestants, which included awards for Best Newcomer and Critic's Choice. Public selected the Albanian representative for the Eurovision Song Contest 2024.

Festival selection
- Winner: "Çmendur" by Mal Retkoceri

Eurovision selection
- Winner: "Zemrën n'dorë" by Besa Kokëdhima

Festivali i Këngës 62 was the 62nd edition of the annual Albanian music competition Festivali i Këngës. The contest was organised by Radio Televizioni Shqiptar (RTSH) at the Palace of Congresses in Tirana, Albania. It consisted of two semi-finals held on 19 and 20 December 2023, followed by a nostalgia night on 21 December and concluded with the grand final on 22 December 2023. The four live shows were hosted by Adriana Matoshi, Kledi Kadiu, Krisa Çaushi, and Xhuliano Dule. Mal Retkoceri emerged as the winner of the contest with his song "Çmendur". The Albanian representative for the Eurovision Song Contest 2024 was determined by public voting, with Besa Kokëdhima and her song "Zemrën n'dorë" being chosen.

== Format ==
The 62nd edition of Festivali i Këngës was organised by Radio Televizioni Shqiptar (RTSH) and took place from 19 to 22 December 2023. The contest consisted of two semi-finals on 19 and 20 December, followed by a nostalgia night on 21 December and concluded with the grand final on 22 December. The four live shows were hosted by Adriana Matoshi, Kledi Kadiu, Krisa Çaushi, and Xhuliano Dule, and were held at the Palace of Congresses in Tirana, Albania. The contest was under the artistic direction of Bojken Lako, with Enkel Demi serving as the screenwriter.

=== Voting ===
As in the preceding edition of the contest, the determination of the winner of Festivali i Këngës was conducted through a jury vote. The winner would not receive an invitation to participate in the Eurovision Song Contest 2024. Instead, a separate televote was designated to select the Albanian representative for the 2024 contest. Eligible voters in the televoting system included the audiences from both Albania and Kosovo.

== Contestants ==
The schedule for musical submissions to the RTSH was opened on 1 September and closed on 10 October 2023. During this period, the broadcaster received over 80 submissions from a diverse group of artists and composers, encompassing participants among others from Albania, Kosovo, Italy and the United States. For the first time, the selection panel was only informed of the identities of the applicants after the submission process had concluded aimed to ensure a fairer outcome in the selection. On 17 October, RTSH published a provisional list of 31 participants selected for the contest. Subsequently, on 1 November, it was announced that artists Samanta Karavella and Kejsi Tola would withdraw from the contest. They were subsequently replaced by Irma Lepuri and the PeterPan Quartet. Further changes to the participants occurred on 1 December, when Sardi Strugaj also announced his withdrawal from the contest. In his place, Eden Baja was designated as a replacement participant.

Key: Withdrawn Replacement

Contestants: Established artists
Artist(s)	Song	Songwriter(s)
Andi Tanko	"Herë pas here"	Andi Tanko
Anduel Kovaçi	"Nan'"	Anduel Kovaçi
Arsi Bako	"Zgjohu"	Arsi Bako; Denis Hima
Besa Kokëdhima	"Zemrën n'dorë"	Kledi Bahiti; Besa Kokëdhima; Rozana Radi; Petrit Sefaj
Besa Krasniqi	"Esenciale"	Besa Krasniqi
Big Basta and Vesa Luma	"Mbinatyrale"	Fabian Basha; Alban Kondi; Gerald Xhari
Eldis Arrnjeti	"Një kujtim"	Eldis Arrnjeti; Bujar Daci
Elsa Lila	"Mars"	Elsa Lila
Festina Mejzini	"Melos"	Sokol Marsi
Kastro Zizo	"2073"	Klevis Bega; Timo Flloko
Kejsi Tola (Note: Withdrawn.)	"Vallëzoj me dritën"	Olti Curri; Kejsi Tola
Melodajn Mancaku	"Nuk jemi më"	Melodajn Mancaku; Wendi Mancaku
Olimpia Smajlaj	"Asaj"	Briz Musaraj; Olimpia Smajlaj
Samanta Karavella	"N'majë"	Liridon Berisha; Samanta Karavella
Sardi Strugaj	"Boshatisur"	Sardi Strugaj
Sergio Hajdini	"Uragan"	Sergio Hajdini
Tiri Gjoci	"Në ëndërr"	Neda Balluku; Tiri Gjoci; Romeo Veshaj

Contestants: New artists
Artist	Song	Songwriter(s)
Bledi Kaso	"Çdo gjë mbaroi"	Bledi Kaso; Pandi Laço
Eden Baja (Note: Replacement.)	"Ajër"	Anxhela Llaha
Erina and the Elementals	"Jetën n'skaj"	Arvit Banishta; Altin Gjoni
Irma Lepuri	"Më prit"	Irma Lepuri
Jasmina Hako	"Ti"	Artemis Veizaj; Florian Zyka
Jehona Ponari	"Evol"	Jehona Ponari
Kleansa Susaj	"Pikturë"	Jeris Kaso; Florian Zyka
Luan Durmishi	"Përsëritja"	Luan Durmishi; Tomor Kuci
Mal Retkoceri	"Çmendur"	Mal Retkoceri
Martina Serreqi	"Vetëm ty"	Markelian Kapidani; Andi Krroqi
Michela Paluca	"Për veten"	Enis Mullaj; Eriona Rushiti
Olsi Ballta	"Unë"	Bledar Gramo
PeterPan Quartet	"Edhe një herë"	Rael Hoxha; PeterPan Quartet
Santino De Bartolo	"Dua të rri me ty"	Santino De Bartolo
Shpat Deda	"S'mund t'fitoj pa ty"	Shpat Deda
Stivi Ushe	"Askush si ty"	Aleks Gjonpalaj; Stivi Ushe
Troy Band	"Horizonti i ëndrrave"	Alda Çuka; Anton Lakuriqi

== Shows ==
=== Semi-finals ===
The semi-finals of Festivali i Këngës took place on 19 and 20 December 2023 and were broadcast live at 21:00 (CET) on the respective dates. The running order for both semi-finals of the contest was determined during a press conference held on 1 November. The first semi-final presented Albanian singer Viola Gjyzeli, who represented Albania in the Junior Eurovision Song Contest 2023, and Italian singer Umberto Tozzi as special guests. Albanian musicians, including Rachelle Andrioti, Aleksandër Gjoka and Indrit Mesiti, performed in the second semi-final.

Key: Automatic Qualifier Qualifier

Semi-final 1–19 December 2023
R/O	Artist	Song	Result
1	Stivi Ushe	"Askush si ty"	—N/a
2	Besa Kokëdhima	"Zemrën n'dorë"	Aut. Qualified
3	Mal Retkoceri	"Çmendur"	Qualified
4	Eldis Arrnjeti	"Një kujtim"	Aut. Qualified
5	Shpat Deda	"S'mund t'fitoj pa ty"	Qualified
6	Jehona Ponari	"Evol"	—N/a
7	PeterPan Quartet	"Edhe një herë"	Qualified
8	Festina Mejzini	"Melos"	Aut. Qualified
9	Kastro Zizo	"2073"	Aut. Qualified
10	Luan Durmishi	"Përsëritja"	—N/a
11	Melodajn Mancaku	"Nuk jemi më"	Aut. Qualified
12	Olsi Ballta	"Unë"	—N/a
13	Andi Tanko	"Herë pas here"	Aut. Qualified
14	Sergio Hajdini	"Uragan"	Aut. Qualified
15	Santino De Bartolo	"Dua të rri me ty"	—N/a
16	Olimpia Smajlaj	"Asaj"	Aut. Qualified

Semi-final 2–20 December 2023
R/O	Artist(s)	Song	Result
1	Big Basta and Vesa Luma	"Mbinatyrale"	Aut. Qualified
2	Elsa Lila	"Mars"	Aut. Qualified
3	Jasmina Hako	"Ti"	—N/a
4	Michela Paluca	"Për veten"	Qualified
5	Anduel Kovaçi	"Nan'"	Aut. Qualified
6	Kleansa Susaj	"Pikturë"	Qualified
7	Eden Baja	"Ajër"	—N/a
8	Erina and the Elementals	"Jetën n'skaj"	Qualified
9	Irma Lepuri	"Më prit"	Qualified
10	Arsi Bako	"Zgjohu"	Aut. Qualified
11	Tiri Gjoci	"Në ëndërr"	Aut. Qualified
12	Besa Krasniqi	"Esenciale"	Aut. Qualified
13	Bledi Kaso	"Çdo gjë mbaroi"	—N/a
14	Troy Band	"Horizonti i ëndrrave"	—N/a
15	Martina Serreqi	"Vetëm ty"	Qualified

=== Nostalgia Night ===
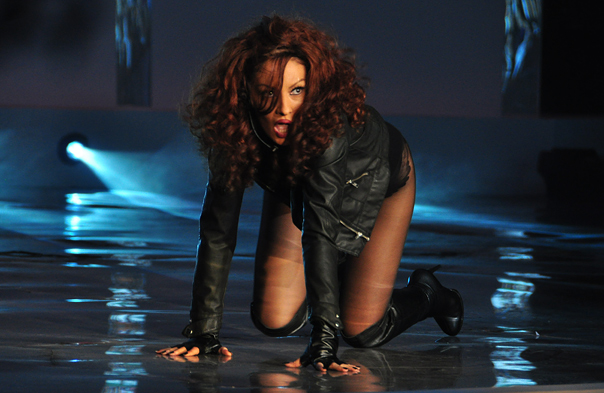
Kosovo-Albanian artist Adelina Ismaili performed her song "Zemrën nuk ta fal" during the nostalgia night as a special guest.

The nostalgia night of Festivali i Këngës took place on 21 December 2023 at 21:00 (CET). Prominent Albanian artists provided accompaniment to some of the contestants in performing renditions of historical popular songs. Following the conclusion of the show, a jury evaluated the performances and selected eight out of 17 contestants from the New artists category to advance to the grand final. The remaining 14 contestants from the Established artists category automatically qualified for the grand final without the need for further evaluation. Kosovo-Albanian artist Adelina Ismaili was a special guest of the show, where she performed her song "Zemrën nuk ta fal".

Nostalgia Night–21 December 2023
R/O	Artist(s)	Guest artist(s)	Song
1	Eldis Arrnjeti	Myfarete Laze	"Pragu i vegjëlisë"
2	Besa Krasniqi	Eranda and Irma Libohova	"Nuk e harroj"
3	Kleansa Susaj and Michela Paluca		"Voilà"
4	Sergio Hajdini	Eneda Tarifa	"Mesnatë"
5	Arsi Bako	Eugent Bushpepa	"S'mund t'jetoj pa ty"
6	Olimpia Smajlaj	Fitnete Tuda	"Shi bie në Tiranë"
7	Jasmina Hako and Mal Retkoceri		"Fairytale"
8	PeterPan Quartet and Troy Band		"Zitti e buoni"
9	Festina Mejzini	Florent Abrashi	"Mes nesh është dashuria"
10	Tiri Gjoci	Sidrit Bejleri	"Erdh pranvera"
11	Andi Tanko	Angus Dei	"Ku është dashuria"
12	Erina and the Elementals and Olsi Ballta		"Hard Rock Hallelujah"
13	Irma Lepuri and Shpat Deda		"Nel blu, dipinto di blu"
14	Jehona Ponari and Martina Serreqi		"Wild Dances"
15	Melodajn Mancaku	Edmond Mancaku	"Telefonatë zemrash"
16	Big Basta and Vesa Luma	Elton Deda	"Qyteti i vjetër"
17	Eden Baja	Anxhela Llaha	"Satellite"
18	Anduel Kovaçi	Ilir Shaqiri	"Udhët e mia"
19	Kastro Zizo	Rea Nuhu	"Sagapo, të dua"
20	Besa Kokëdhima	Jehona Sopi	"Rrjedh në këngë e ligjërime"
21	Elsa Lila	Enrico Melozzi	"Një serenatë për dy"
22	Luan Durmishi and Santino De Bartolo		"Insieme: 1992"
23	Bledi Kaso and Stivi Ushe		"Arcade"

=== Final ===
The grand final of Festivali i Këngës took place on 22 December 2023 at 21:00 (CET). Though there were only 22 finalists in the grand final, all 31 contestants, including those who were eliminated, were eligible for the selection of the Albanian representative for the Eurovision Song Contest 2024. Several influential figures attended the live show, including the President of Albania, Bajram Begaj, Speaker of the Parliament, Lindita Nikolla, as well as the Prime Minister of Kosovo, Albin Kurti. Performing guests included Albanian singer Aurela Gaçe, actor Nik Xhelilaj, and Kosovo-Albanian singer La Fazani, who was the winner of the inaugural edition of Festivali i Këngës in Kosovo.

The jury determined Mal Retkoceri as the winner of the contest with his song "Çmendur". Tiri Gjoci secured second place with "Në ëndërr", while Shpat Deda took third place with "S'mund t'fitoj pa ty". The PeterPan Quartet was awarded the Best Newcomer Award for their song "Edhe një herë", and Martina Serreqi received the Critic's Choice Award for her song "Vetëm ty". Additionally, the winner of the televoting was Besa Kokëdhima with her song "Zemrën n'dorë", which concurrently designated her as the Albanian representative for Eurovision 2024.

Key: Winner Second place Third place

Grand final–22 December 2023
R/O	Artist	Song	Place
1	Kastro Zizo	"2073"	—N/a
2	Mal Retkoceri	"Çmendur"	1
3	Erina and the Elementals	"Jetën n'skaj"	—N/a
4	Melodajn Mancaku	"Nuk jemi më"	—N/a
5	Tiri Gjoci	"Në ëndërr"	2
6	Kleansa Susaj	"Pikturë"	—N/a
7	Irma Lepuri	"Më prit"	—N/a
8	Festina Mejzini	"Melos"	—N/a
9	Eldis Arrnjeti	"Një kujtim"	—N/a
10	Martina Serreqi	"Vetëm ty"	—N/a
11	Besa Krasniqi	"Esenciale"	—N/a
12	Sergio Hajdini	"Uragan"	—N/a
13	Olimpia Smajlaj	"Asaj"	—N/a
14	Anduel Kovaçi	"Nan'"	—N/a
15	Michela Paluca	"Për veten"	—N/a
16	PeterPan Quartet	"Edhe një herë"	—N/a
17	Besa Kokëdhima	"Zemrën n'dorë"	—N/a
18	Arsi Bako	"Zgjohu"	—N/a
19	Elsa Lila	"Mars"	—N/a
20	Andi Tanko	"Herë pas here"	—N/a
21	Shpat Deda	"S'mund t'fitoj pa ty"	3
22	Big Basta and Vesa Luma	"Mbinatyrale"	—N/a

== Broadcasts ==
The four live shows of Festivali i Këngës were broadcast from 19 December to 22 December 2023 on RTSH in Albania. Each evening comprised a dedicated program on RTSH 24 and Radio 2, wherein participating artists shared insights into their behind-the-scenes experiences. Furthermore, the shows were transmitted through Radio Televizioni i Kosovës (RTK) in Kosovo. The grand final was also broadcast on Radio i Televizija Crne Gore through the Radio Crne Gore channel in Montenegro, as well as on Makedonska Radio Televizija through the MRT 2 channel in North Macedonia.

Broadcasters of Festivali i Këngës
Country	Broadcaster	Channel	Show(s)	Ref
Albania	RTSH	RTSH 1	All shows	
Albania	RTSH	RTSH Muzikë	All shows	
Albania	RTSH	Radio Tirana	All shows	
Kosovo	RTK	RTK Muzikë	Show 1 – 3	
Kosovo	RTK	RTK 1	Final	
Montenegro	RTCG	Radio Crne Gore	Final	
North Macedonia	MRT	MRT 2	Final	

== See also ==
- Festivali i Këngës
- Eurovision Song Contest 2024
- Albania in the Eurovision Song Contest 2024
