= Zjerm =

Zjerm ("fire" in Albanian, definite form zjermi) may refer to:

- Zjerm (Albanian paganism), fire in Albanian tradition
- "Zjerm" (song), by the Albanian duo Shkodra Elektronike, 2024
- Zjermi ("The Twins"), the twin protagonist of an Albanian folk tale
