= Rozana Radi =

Albanian singer-songwriter and actress (born 1979)

- Born: July 6, 1979 (age 47); Tirana, PSR Albania
- Other name: Rozi Radi
- Education: Academy of Arts Tirana
- Occupations: Singer; actress; television presenter
- Years active: 2000–present

Rozana Radi (Albanian: [ɾɔˈzana ˈɾadi]; born July 6, 1979) is an Albanian actress, singer-songwriter, and television presenter. She emerged as the winner of Kënga Magjike in 2016 and 2024. She is the host of the afternoon show series Një Gotë Rosè, aired on MCN TV. Additionally, in December 2024, she joined the reality TV show Big Brother VIP Albania 4 as a contestant. She reached the final as one of the four finalists, finishing as the runner-up.

== Life and career ==
=== 1979–2012: Early life and career beginnings ===
Rozana Radi was born on 6 July 1979 into an Albanian family in the city of Tirana, People's Republic of Albania, present Albania. Radi has released several successful singles in Albania, as well as collaborated with several famous Albanian artists. Together with rapper Noizy, she has released the singles "Fly" and "Mr. Yesterday". In 2009, Radi performed in Kënga Magjike in 2009, where she finished 10th with the song "Femër" and received a prize for best singing style. The following year she performed in Kënga Magjike 2010 with Ramadan Krasniqi and with the song "Valsi i tradhtisë". In 2011 she entered the competition for the third year in a row when she participated in Kënga Magjike 2011. This time she participated with rapper Mc Kresha and with the song "Jabadabadu". In May 2012, she released with the band Aragona the ballad "Tepër jemi dashtë". During the summer of 2012 she released the song "O sa mirë me qenë shqiptar" and during the autumn she participated in Kënga Magjike 2012 with the song "Ti s'ke zemër". She was also awarded the prize for best performance in the competition.

=== 2013–present: Kënga Magjike and continued success ===
In 2013 Radi participated in Kënga Magjike 2013 with the song "Bekim". She reached the second semi-final of the competition and also made it to the finals. In the final Radi got 494 points and finished in eighth place. In 2016 Radi performed in Kënga Magjike with the song "Ma thuaj ti" which she herself wrote with Elgit Doda. She made her way to the finals where, after voting, she was the winner of the competition. In December 2017 she made a contribution to the Festivali i Këngës when she wrote the text of Manjola Nallbani's contribution "I njëjti qiell". In 2009, Radi starred in the US-launched Albanian short film Mira. The film was produced by Dhimitër Ismajlaj and Radi played with Tinka Kurti, and among others. The film was launched at the Real to Reel International Film Festival in the United States in July 2009. The film was filmed in Tirana.

On 22 December 2023, the song "Zemrën n'dorë", which Radi co-authored alongside Besa Kokëdhima, Kledi Bahiti and Petrit Stefaj, was selected at Festivali i Këngës 62 to be the Albanian entry for the Eurovision Song Contest 2024. However, the lyrics she co-wrote with Stefaj were replaced by English-language lyrics by Gia Koka ahead of the contest.

== Personal life ==
Radi's uncle, Françesk Radi, is also a singer. She had been in a relationship with Kosovo-Albanian rapper MC Kresha. They split in 2012. Radi is currently engaged to Albanian police officer Shpëtim Karakushi.

Awards and achievements
Preceded by Aurela Gaçe with "Akoma jo"	Kënga Magjike; 2016	Succeeded by Anxhela Peristeri with "E çmëndur"

Awards and achievements
Preceded by Marsela Çibukaj with "I paftuar"	Kënga Magjike; 2024	Succeeded by TBD
