= Shkodra Elektronike =

Albanian musical duo

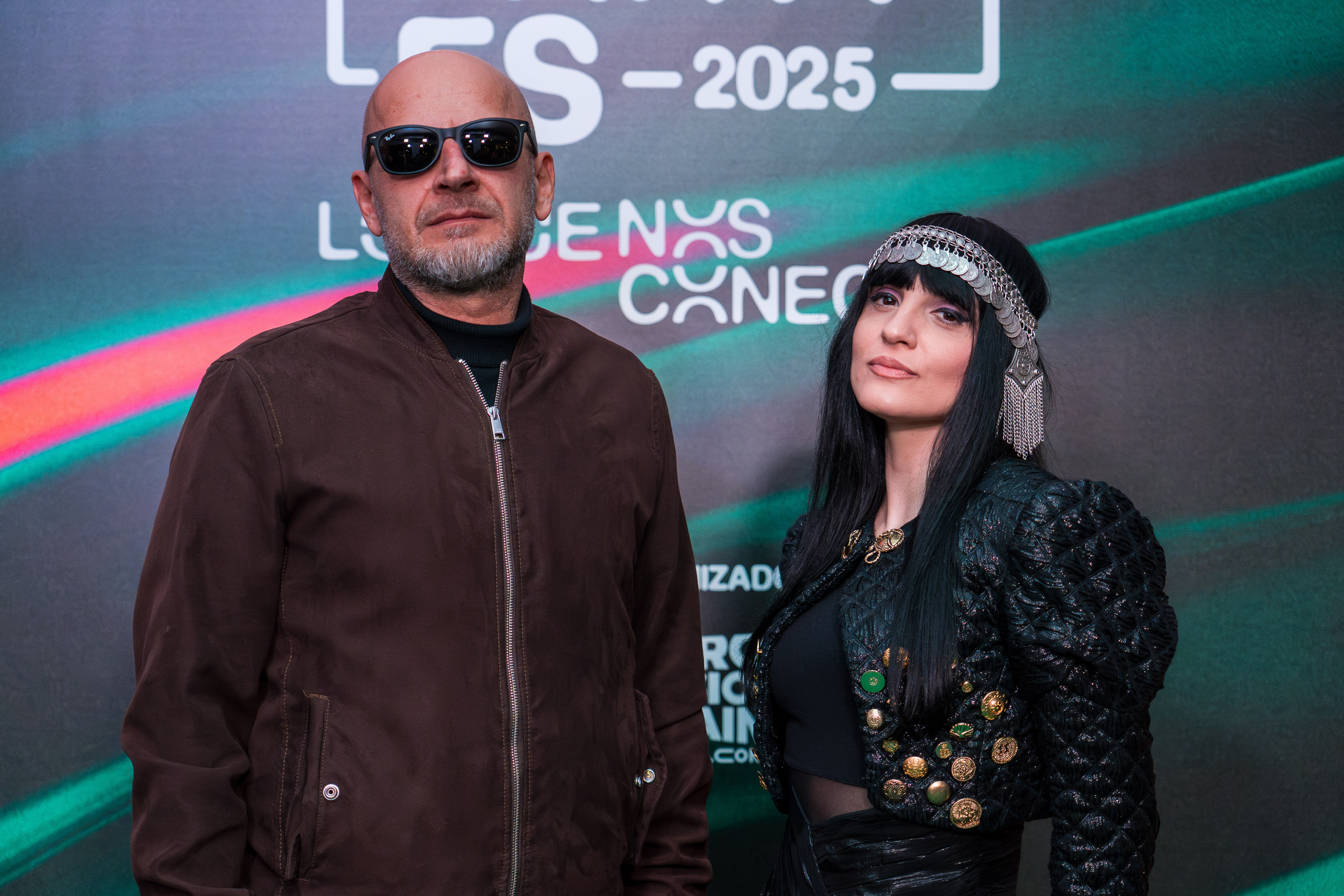
- Shkodra Elektronike in 2025

Background information
- Origin: Shkodër, Albania
- Genre: Folktronica
- Years active: 2019–present
- Label: Alt Orient
- Members: Kolë Laca; Beatriçe Gjergji
- Website: https://www.shkodraelektronike.com/

Shkodra Elektronike (Albanian pronunciation: [ˈʃkɔdɾa ɛlɛktɾɔˈnikɛ]) is an Albanian folktronica duo formed in 2019 in Shkodër and consists of members Kolë Laca (Albanian pronunciation: [ˈkɔlə ˈlat͡sa]) and Beatriçe Gjergji (Albanian pronunciation: [beaˈtɾit͡ʃɛ ˈɟɛɾɟi]). They represented Albania in the Eurovision Song Contest 2025 with the song "Zjerm", placing eighth in the final. Their music combines electronic, pop, and traditional Albanian elements.

== Career ==
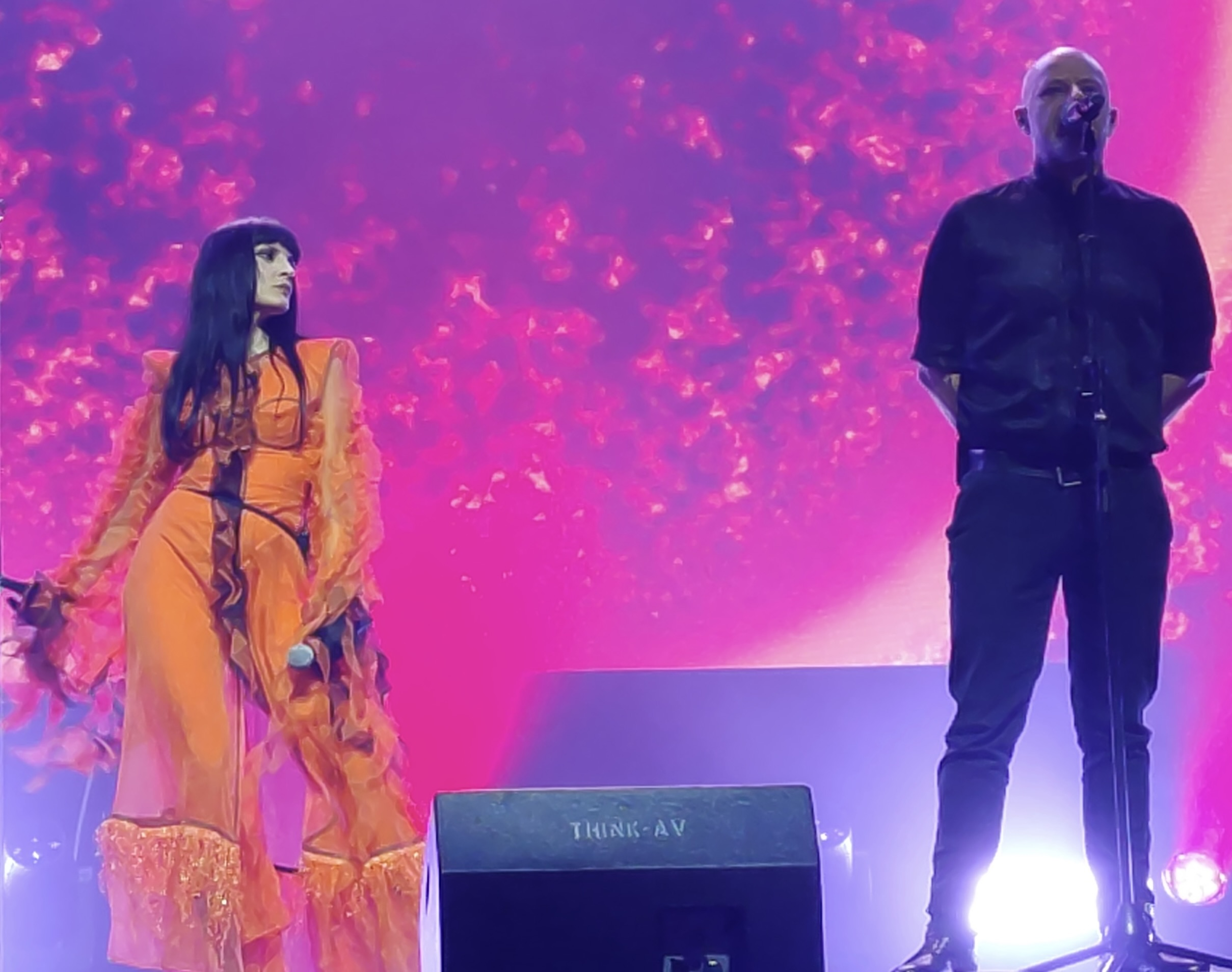
Shkodra Elektronike performing at Eurovision in Concert in 2025

The duo are originally from Shkodër in northern Albania. Both members were born in Shkodër, later moving to Italy where they grew up and acquired dual Albanian–Italian citizenship. They gained popularity in Albania through the release of successful singles such as "Ku e Gjeta Vedin" and "Synin si Qershia" in 2020. They began performing at various international festivals.

Shkodra Elektronike also composed "E jemja nuse" which was performed by Rezarta Smaja in Festivali i Këngës 60, finishing in third place. In 2022, they released their debut EP, Live @ Uzina, with the featured single "Turtulleshë".

=== Eurovision Song Contest 2025 ===
In 2024, Shkodra Elektronike was selected to compete in Festivali i Këngës 63 with the song "Zjerm". On 21 December 2024, they secured their place in the final, ultimately winning the festival and going on to represent Albania in the Eurovision Song Contest 2025. They placed eighth in the Eurovision grand final with a total of 218 points.

Although they did not win Eurovision, they received highly positive reviews from critics. In a CNN article titled "All 26 Eurovision songs, ranked from worst to first", Shkodra Elektronike's "Zjerm" was ranked as the best song entry.

The article highlighted the duo's distinctive pairing and their song's evocative lyrics, noting their potential to secure a victory for Albania. CNN quoted Gjergji expressing the immense emotions and pressure of performing on the Eurovision stage, while also noting the duo's ambivalence toward the contest's typical music, which added to their unique appeal and garnered significant fan buzz.

== Musical style and artistry ==
The music of Shkodra Elektronike is characterized by a fusion of genres such as electronic, pop, and traditional Albanian music. It is structured around catchy melodies, engaging rhythms, and lyrics that often address themes like love or everyday life. The core of the project is the duo's passion for re-interpreting traditional songs of Shkodër in a contemporary electronic style.

== Discography ==
=== Extended plays ===
Title	Details
Live @ Uzina	Released: 10 March 2022; Label: Alt Orient; Formats: Digital download, streaming
Shndrit!	Released: 23 May 2025; Label: NUDA; Formats: Digital download, streaming

=== Singles ===
Title	Year	Peak chart positions				Album or EP
Title	Year	GRE Intl.	LTU	SWE Heat.	SWI	Album or EP
"Ku e gjeta vedin"	2020	—	—	—	—	Non-album singles
"Synin si qershia"	2020	—	—	—	—	Non-album singles
"Turtulleshë"	2022	—	—	—	—	Live @ Uzina
"Vaj si kenka ba dynjaja" (featuring Fanfara Tirana)	2023	—	—	—	—	Non-album single
"Zjerm"	2024	8	29	13	78	Shndrit!
"Fosforon"	2025	—	—	—	—	Non-album singles
"Stuhi" (featuring Redi Hasa)	2026	—	—	—	—	Non-album singles
"E jemja nuse"	2026	—	—	—	—	Non-album singles
"Malësori elektronik"	2026	—	—	—	—	Non-album singles
"Me dashtë"	2026	—	—	—	—	Non-album singles
"—" denotes a recording that did not chart or was not released in that territory.

== Awards and nominations ==
Year	Award	Category	Nominee(s)	Result	Ref.
2025	Eurovision Awards	Style Icon	Themselves	Nominated	

Awards and achievements
Preceded by Mal Retcoceri with "Çmendur"	Festivali i Këngës; Winner; 2024	Succeeded by Alis with "Nân"
Preceded by Besa with "Titan"	Albania in the Eurovision Song Contest; 2025	Succeeded by Alis with "Nân"
