= Alis (singer) =

Albanian singer

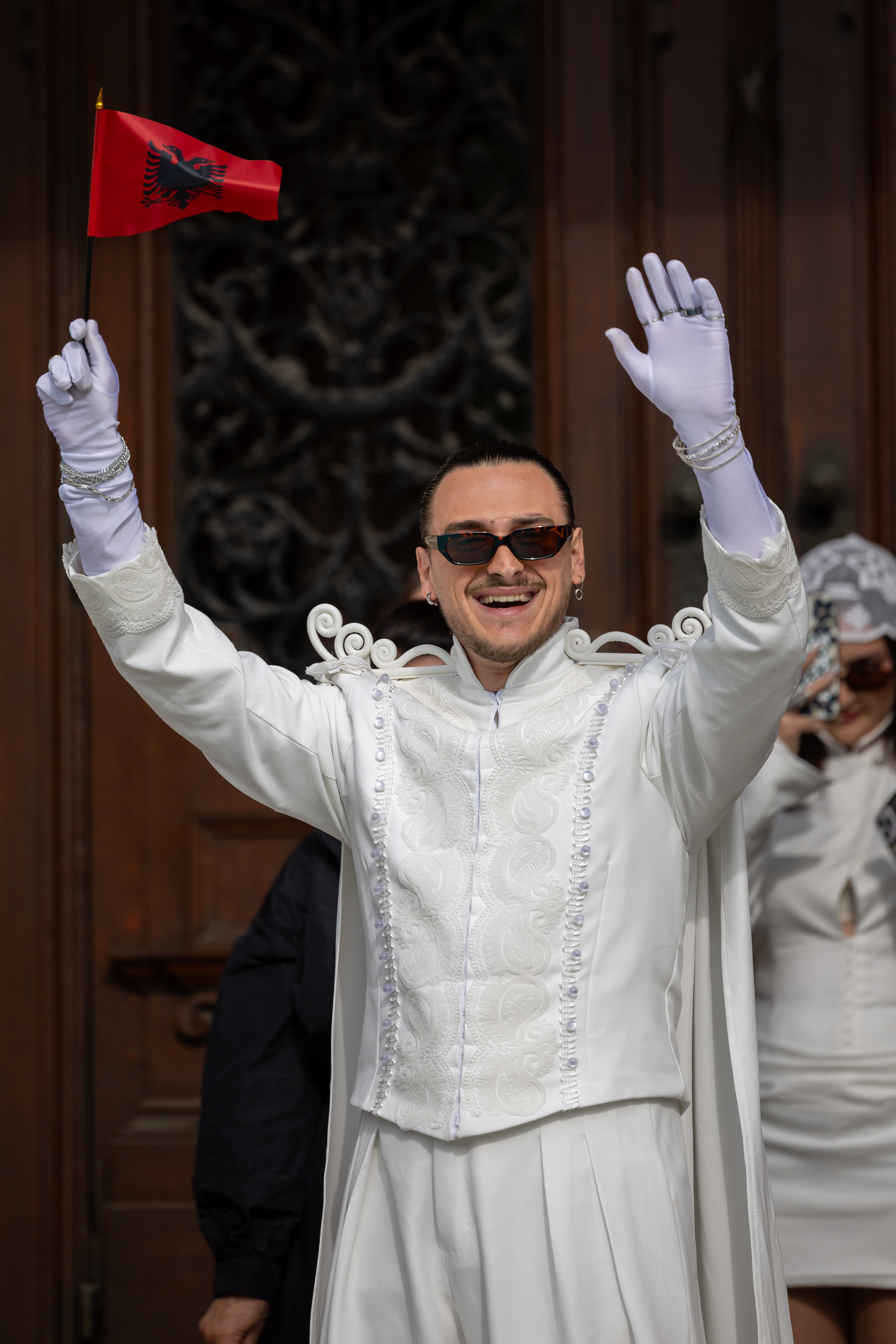
- Alis in 2026

Background information
- Born: Alis Kallaçi; 29 June 2002 (age 24); Shkodër, Shkodër County, Albania
- Occupations: Singer; songwriter
- Instruments: Vocals; piano; guitar

Alis Kallaçi (born 29 June 2002), known mononymously as Alis, is an Albanian singer and songwriter. He won the fifth season of the Albanian television music competition X Factor. He represented Albania in the Eurovision Song Contest 2026 with the song "Nân".

== Biography ==
Alis Kallaçi was born and raised in Shkodër. He completed his piano diploma at the Prenk Jakova Art School. He is currently studying music pedagogy.

In April 2024, Kallaçi won the fifth season of X Factor as part of team Arilena Ara. In November 2024, he was selected to compete in the 63rd edition of Festivali i Këngës with the song "Mjegull"; he placed third in the final on 22 December 2024.

In October 2025, Kallaçi was selected to compete in the 64th edition of Festivali i Këngës with the song "Nân"; he won the final on 20 December 2025, which enabled him to represent Albania in the Eurovision Song Contest 2026. He qualified for the final in which he placed 13th with 145 points.

== Discography ==
=== Singles ===
| Title | Year | Peak chart positions | Album or EP |
| Title | Year | GRE Intl. | Album or EP |
|---|---|---|---|
| "Se të dua" (with Arilena Ara) | 2024 | — | Non-album singles |
| "Mjegull" | 2024 | — | Non-album singles |
| "S'ta kam than" | 2025 | — | Non-album singles |
| "Nân" | 2025 | 71 | Non-album singles |
| "Ku po shkon" | 2026 | — | Non-album singles |
"—" denotes a recording that did not chart or was not released in that territory.

Awards and achievements
| Preceded by Shkodra Elektronike | Festivali i Këngës; Winner; 2025 | Succeeded by TBD |
| Preceded by Shkodra Elektronike with "Zjerm" | Albania in the Eurovision Song Contest; 2026 | Succeeded by TBD |
