= Besa (singer) =

Albanian singer (born 1986)

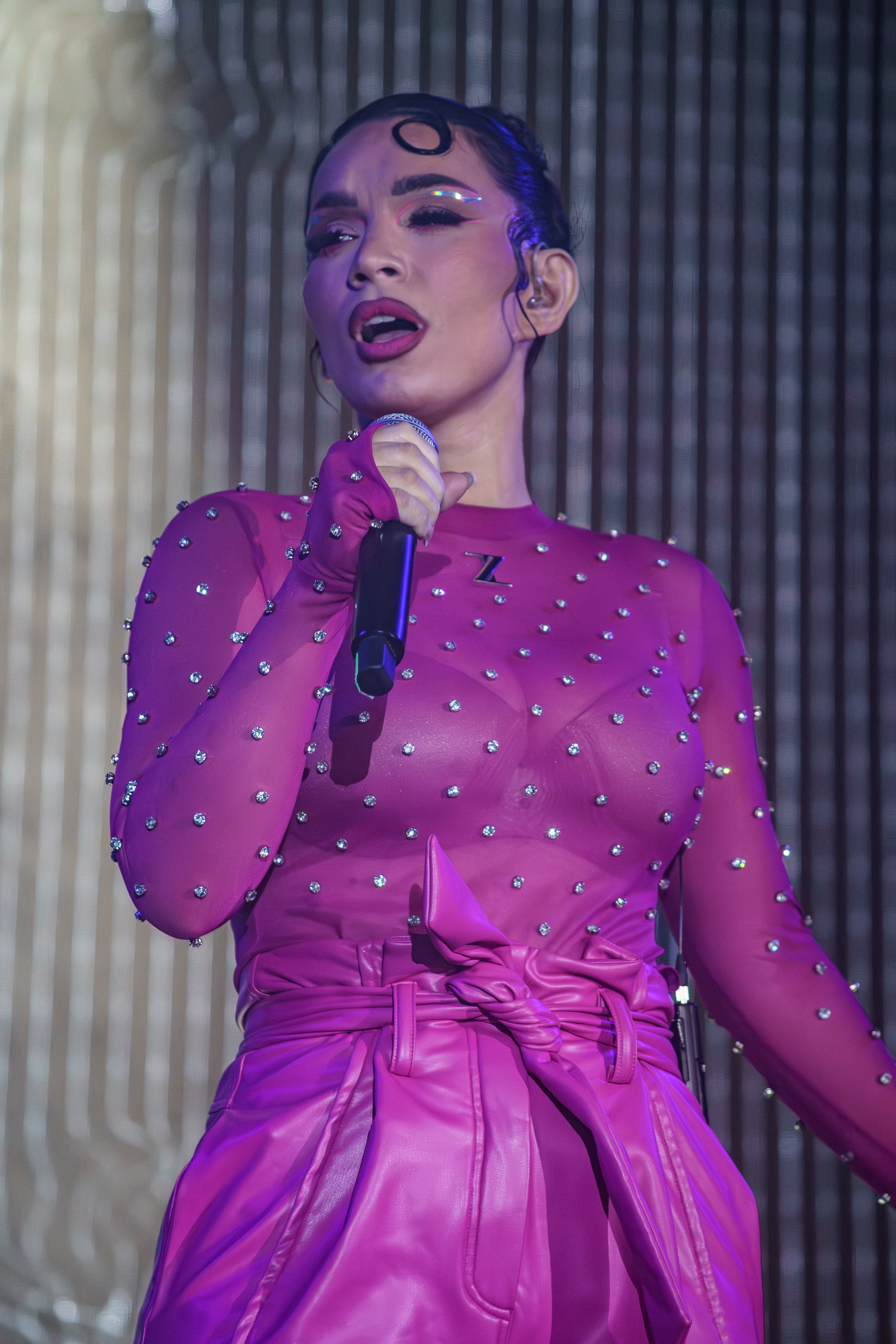
- Kokëdhima performing in 2024

Background information
- Born: Besa Kokëdhima; 29 May 1986 (age 40); Fier, PSR Albania
- Origin: Qeparo, Vlorë, Albania
- Occupation: Singer
- Years active: 2003–present
- Label: Independent

Besa Kokëdhima (Albanian pronunciation: [ˈbɛsa kɔk(ə)ˈðima]; born 29 May 1986), also known mononymously as Besa, is an Albanian singer. In 2013, she won the 15th edition of Kënga Magjike. She represented Albania in the Eurovision Song Contest 2024 with the song "Titan".

== Life and career ==
Kokëdhima was born on 29 May 1986 into an Albanian family in the city of Fier then part of the People's Socialist Republic, present Albania. At the age of 15, she emigrated to the United Kingdom to pursue higher education. In 2003, Besa released her debut song "Më Beso", which was written by producer Florian Mumajesi, and featured the then newly formed Albanian group Produkt 28. The song was awarded "Mikorofoni I Artë" in 2003. Besa released her debut album, titled "Besa", in 2006. The album was written in collaboration with well-known Albanian music industry personalities, including Dorian Gjoni, Flori Mumajesi, Genti Lako, Andy DJ and Stine.

Besa has participated in a number of music contests including "Notafest", where she was awarded first prize for the R&B single "Lëshoje Hapin". In 2009, Besa participated in the Selecţia Naţională in Romania for the Eurovision Song Contest, with the English-language song "Nothin' Gonna Change", and reached the semi-finals. In 2010, Besa competed in Top Fest and won Best Female Singer with her single "Kalorësi i Natës". Since 2010, Besa has released a number of singles, including "Fishekzjarre", in 2012, "Burning" in 2013, and "Zemrën Dot Nuk ta Lexoj" in 2014. These were commercially successful and well received.

Besa has released two albums, titled “Besa për Festat” and “Ti Je Festa Ime”. The tracks were accompanied by music videos featuring Besa and the National Orchestra. The album also featured a Christmas Version of the song “Tatuazh ne Zemer”. The album “Ti Je Festa Ime” received positive reviews, with one article calling the album ‘one of the most well-received projects of the year’. In 2013, Besa won Kënga Magjike. Besa has been a judge on the Albanian television show The Voice of Albania since 2017.

Besa made her debut in France with her French ballad "En Equilibre" in June 2022, which was positively received. "En Equilibre" is the first of her upcoming debut album produced within the French music industry. In 2023, she was selected to compete in the Festivali i Këngës 62 with the song "Zemrën n'dorë", where she won the public vote and was selected to represent Albania in the Eurovision Song Contest 2024. At the contest, the song was performed in an English version, titled "Titan". Besa failed to qualify from the second semi-final, placing 15th out of 16 with 14 points. In 2025, she competed to represent San Marino in the Eurovision Song Contest 2025 with the song "Tiki" but placed 6th in the Sammarinese national selection. That year, she also released several singles and collaborations, including “Look at Ya”, “Ring My Bell”, “Përgjithmonë” with Buci, “Nihna” with Tiri Gjoci, “Rrena” with Anxhela Peristeri and Marin, “Alina” and “Ylli Polar” featuring DJ Iljano.

In 2026, she released “Ani mori Nuse” with MC Kresha and Nostalgia, a collection of previously recorded material from earlier in her career. In 2026, she also released ADN, a live-recorded ballad album.

== Public image and advocacy ==
Beyond her music career, Besa has been involved in public advocacy related to animal welfare, domestic violence awareness, women’s rights, equality and broader social causes. She has helped stray animals and has taken part in public protests for animal rights, as well as causes connected to equality, domestic violence, women and social justice.

== Awards and recognition ==
Year	Work / Role	Recognition
2003	“Më beso” with Produkt 28	First Prize — Mikrofoni i Artë
2005	“Zonja dhe Zotërinj”	Radio Hit Award — Mikrofoni i Artë
2006	“Lëshoje Hapin”	First Prize — Notafest
2006	“Tani të dua”	Best Dance — Kënga Magjike
2007	“Pa yllin tënd”	Jon Music Award — Kënga Magjike
2007	“Unik”	Best Pop & Rock — Top Fest
2008	“Engjëjt vrasin njëlloj”	Winner — Top Fest 5
2008	“Engjëjt vrasin njëlloj”	Public Vote — Top Fest 5
2010	“Kalorësi i Natës”	Best Female Singer — Top Fest
2010	“Kalorësi i Natës”	Best Video Award — Videofest Kosovo
2010	Stage performance	International Stage Performance Award — Ohrid Fest / Ohrid Troubadours
2011	“Botën do ndryshoja”	Critics Award — Kënga Magjike
2011	“Botën do ndryshoja”	Third Prize — Kënga Magjike
2012	“Fishekzjarre”	Top Albania Radio Award — Top Fest
2013	“Tatuazh në zemër”	Winner — Kënga Magjike 15
2017	The Voice of Albania	Coach; voted audience’s favourite coach
2023	“Zemrën n’dorë”	Public vote winner — Festivali i Këngës 62 / Albania Eurovision selection
2024	“Titan”	Albania’s entry — Eurovision Song Contest 2024
2025	“Tiki”	6th place — San Marino Song Contest
2025	Public / cultural recognition	Civic & Cultural Excellence Recognition Award — Municipality of Himara

== Discography ==
=== Albums ===
- Besa (2006)
- Evolution (2011)
- Besa për festat (2013)
- Ti je festa ime (2014)
- X (2016)
- Stubborn (2019)
- Complicated (2024)
- Rebel (2025)
- Nostalgia (2026)
- Adn (2026)

=== Singles ===
==== As lead artist ====
Title	Year	Peak chart positions	Album or EP
Title	Year	ALB	Album or EP
"Më beso" (with Produkt 28)	2003	—N/a	Besa
"Zonja dhe Zotërinj"	2005	—N/a	Besa
"Lëshoje hapin"	2006	—N/a	Besa
"Tani të dua"	2006	—N/a	Non-album singles
"Unik"	2007	—N/a	Non-album singles
"Pa yllin tënd"	2007	—N/a	Non-album singles
"Engjëjt vrasin njëlloj"	2008	—N/a	Non-album singles
"Ajër"	2008	—N/a	Non-album singles
"Nothin' Gonna Change"	2009	—N/a	Non-album singles
"Kalorës i natës"	2010	—N/a	Non-album singles
"Nuk jam ajo" (featuring Jehona Sopi)	2010	—N/a	Non-album singles
"E bukura dhe bisha"	2010	—N/a	Non-album singles
"Botën do ndryshoja"	2011	—N/a	Non-album singles
"Always On My Mind"	2012	—N/a	Non-album singles
"Fishekzjarre"	2012	—N/a	Non-album singles
"Folie"	2013	—N/a	Non-album singles
"Tatuazh në zemër"	2013	—N/a	Non-album singles
"Zemrën dot nuk ta lexoj" (featuring 2po2)	2014	—N/a	Non-album singles
"Mbretëreshë"	2014	—N/a	Non-album singles
"Zejemër" (featuring Majk)	2014	—N/a	Non-album singles
"Arabia (Faj)" (featuring Gmd Babydave)	2014	—N/a	Non-album singles
"Amelia" (featuring Mattyas)	2015	—N/a	Non-album singles
"14"	2015	—N/a	Non-album singles
"All In"	2015	—N/a	Non-album singles
"Kameleon" (featuring Ansi)	2016	—	Non-album singles
"123" (featuring Flori Mumajesi)	2016	8	Non-album singles
"Hangover"	2016	—	Non-album singles
"Kokëfortë"	2017	—	Non-album singles
"Mos m'le me ra" (featuring Elinel)	2017	—	Non-album singles
"Amor"	2018	—	Non-album singles
"La La La"	2019	—	Non-album singles
"Histori"	2019	—	Non-album singles
"C'est la vie" (featuring BledBeats)	2020	1	Non-album singles
"Don" (featuring Illeoon)	2020	—	Non-album singles
"Margjelo" (with Garrido)	2021	—	Non-album singles
"En equilibre"	2022	—	Non-album singles
"Si kalama" (with Lyrical Son)	2022	—	Non-album singles
"Zemrën n'dorë"	2023	—	Non-album singles
"Engjëjt vrasin njëlloj" (with Marin Hoxha)	2023	—	Non-album singles
"Inshallah" (with Impar)	2024	—	Non-album singles
"Plastic Heart" (with Marin Hoxha)	2024	—	Non-album singles
"Titan"	2024	—	Non-album singles
"Aman" (with Marin Hoxha)	2024	—	Non-album singles
"Tiki"	2025	—	Non-album singles
"Pergjithmone" (with Buci)	2025	—	Non-album singles
"Maria" (with Marin Hoxha)	2025	—	Non-album singles
"Nihna" (with Tiri Gjoci)	2025	—	Non-album singles
"Look At Ya"	2025	—	Non-album singles
"Rrena" (with Anxhela Peristeri and Marin)	2025	—	Non-album singles
"Ring My Bell"	2025	—	Non-album singles
"Alina"	2025	—	Non-album singles
"Ylli Polar" (with DJ Iljano)	2025	4	Non-album singles
"Ani Mori Nuse" (with MC Kresha)	2026	—	Non-album singles
"—" denotes a recording that did not chart or was not released in that territory.

Awards and achievements
Preceded by Alban Skenderaj with "Rrefuzoj"	Kënga Magjike; Winner; 2013	Succeeded by Aurela Gaçe and Young Zerka with "Pa kontroll"
Preceded by Albina and Familja Kelmendi with "Duje"	Albania in the Eurovision Song Contest; 2024	Succeeded by Shkodra Elektronike with "Zjerm"
