= Ylljet Aliçka =

Albanian writer and scriptwriter

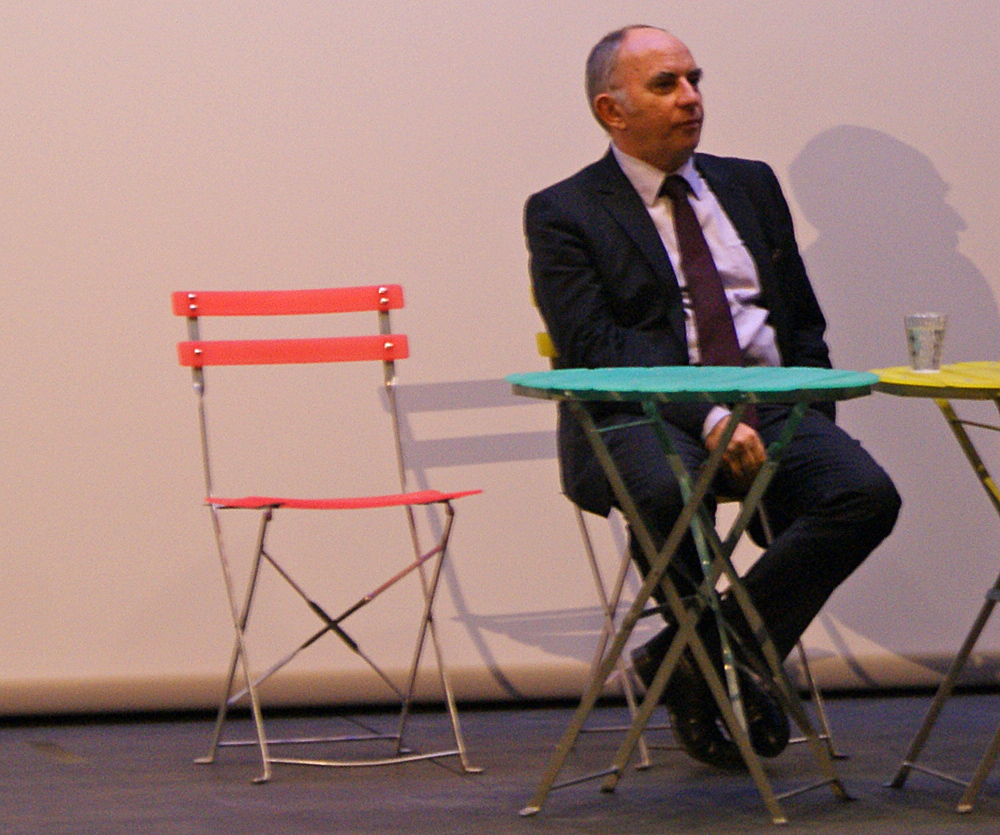
- Ylljet Aliçka 2012 in Geneva
- Born: Tirana
- Occupations: writer and scriptwriter
- Writing career
- Language: Albanian

Ylljet Aliçka (born 1951) is an Albanian writer and scriptwriter, mostly known as the author of the novel The Stone Slogans, (film Slogans) and the controversial novel A Story With Internationals, which satirizes the diplomatic elite accredited in transition countries.

== Biography ==
Ylljet Aliçka was born and lives in Tirana, Albania.

Academic career:

- 1969–1973: Natural science's studies, Tirana University
- 1991: Doctor: didactic sciences
- 2016: Professor Doctor

Professional career:

- 1973–1981, a schoolmaster in Mat region, Albania
- 1981–1992, Publishing house of schoolbooks, Tirana
- 1992–1997, Head of International relations, Ministry of Culture, Tirana, Albanian representant to CDDC-Council of Europe
- 1998–2007, Communication officer, Delegation of the European Commission, Tirana
- 2007–2013, Ambassador of Albania, in France, Monaco, Portugal, Algeria, UNESCO. The personal representative of the President of Republic at Agence International de la Francophonie.
- 2014–2019, Albanian representant at Eurimage (Council of Europe)
- 2013–2020, Professor at European University of Tirana
- 2020....Albanian Mediterranean University and University of Arts.

== Literary publications ==
=== In Albania ===
- Tregime (1998) Onufri
- Kompromisi (2001) Onufri
- Rrëfenje me ndërkombëtarë (2006) OMSCA
- Parrullat me gurë (2007) Toena
- Rrëfenje me ndërkombëtarë (2008) Toena
- Koha e puthjeve (2009) Toena
- Valsi i lumturisë (2012) Toena
- Metamorfoza e nje kryeqyteti (2019) Onufri

=== Abroad ===
- Les slogans de pierre (1999) Edition Climates; France
- Kompromis (2001) Publishing House Pogranicze, Poland
- Balkan blood, Balkan beauty (2006) North-western University Press, U.S.
- I compagni di pietra (2006) Guaraldi, Italy
- Albanien(2008), Edition Temmen, Germany
- Les slogans de pierre (2009) Edition Pyramidion, France
- Les étrangères (2010) Edition Pyramidion, France
- La sloganoj el stonoj (2013) Esperanto, Swidnik, Poland
- Když projížděl Chruščov naší vesnicí (2015) Petr Štengl Edition, Czech Republic
- Un sogno italiano (2016) Rubbettino editore, Italy
- Mappe 12 fra Tirana (2017) Bokvennen Forlag, Norway
- Internationals (2017) Tirana times, Albania
- Nouvelles d'avant (2018) Edition Pyramidion, France
- La valse du bonheur (2019) L'Esprit du temps, France
- Gli internazionali (2019) Rubbettino editore, Italy
- Internationals (2020) Degarandishan Publishing House; Iran
- Steinerne parolen(2020) Monda assembleo socia, Cuba-Germany,
- Les etrangeres(2021), Editions des 60, France
- La metamorphose d'une capitale(2021), Editions des 60 France
- La metamorfosi di una capitale(2021), Castelvechi editore Italy

== Screenplays ==
- Slogans (2001) French-Albanian film, based on the book Les slogans de pierre
- An Albanian chronicle (2008) French-Italian-Albanian film based on the book The Compromise
- An Expat's tale(2018) Art film, based on the novel "Internationals"
- The poet(2019)Teo film, based on short story "The poet"
- Profesionist(2020) Bunker film, based on the short story "Stone slogans"

Prizes: in literature

- 1999 – First prize, International competition of short stories, Teramo, Italy
- 2000 – Second prize, International competition Art e letters de France, Bordeaux, France
- 2001 – Silver medal in prose by the Albanian Ministry of Culture, Tirana, Albania
- 2002 – Prix de la francophonie, Albanian Ministry of Foreign Affairs, Tirana, Albania
- 2009 – Special prize, VII Premio Letterario Nazionale, Rome, Italy
- 2012 – Silver medal in prose for Valsi i lumturisë by the Albanian Ministry of Culture, Tirana, Albania

in cinematography:

- 2001 – Slogans Young critics award, Festival de Cannes, Cannes, France
- 2006 – Slogans, Best screenplay, Albanian Film Festival by the Ministry of Culture,
- 2011 – Një histori provinciale, Best screenplay, South-East European Film Festival, Paris, France
- 2016 – "Plastic flowers", Winner-Hollywood International Moving Pictures Film Festival (HIMPFF),
- 2018 – "Plastic flowers"Best screenplay, Korça Short Film Fest

Memberships:

- Founder member Fondazione Fabrizio De Andre Milano, Itali
- Honoured citizenship La Republique De Montmartre, Paris, 2011
- Member of French Academy du Berry- George Sand, Paris 2010
- Member of Francophone writers association, Paris, 2012
- Member of audiovisual and dramatic authors, SACD, Paris, 2006
