= Anila Basha =

Albanian journalist and media executive (born 1976)

Member of the Executive Committee of the Albanian Football Federation
- Incumbent
- Assumed office March 2022

Personal details
- Born: December 25, 1976 (age 49) Lushnjë, PSR Albania
- Children: 1
- Education: University of Tirana
- Occupation: Journalist media executive

Anila Basha (born December 25, 1976) is an Albanian journalist and media executive. She is a member of the Executive Committee of the Albanian Football Federation (FSHF). Basha is the co-founder and publisher of the newspaper Shqiptarja.com, and the founder of the online news platforms Newsbomb.al and Newsport.al.

== Early life and education ==
Basha was born in Lushnjë, Albania. She graduated with a degree in journalism from the Faculty of History and Philology in 1999 and later completed a master's degree in European Studies at the University of Tirana.

== Career ==
Basha began her journalism career in 1995, contributing to newspapers including Intervista and Dita Informacion. In 1998, she worked as a political journalist and editor at Koha Jonë. By 2000, she held editorial positions at Koha Jonë and Panorama and later became editor-in-chief and director of Gazeta Shqiptare, a role she held for over ten years.

She co-founded the print and online version of Shqiptarja.com and in 2016 established the media outlets Newsbomb.al and Newsport.al. She has participated in television panels on political, sports, and social topics.

== Role in football ==
In March 2022, Basha was elected as the first female member of the Executive Committee of the FSHF. Her work focuses on women's football in Albania, media-related matters, and communication with the public.
