= Rea Nuhu =

Music artist

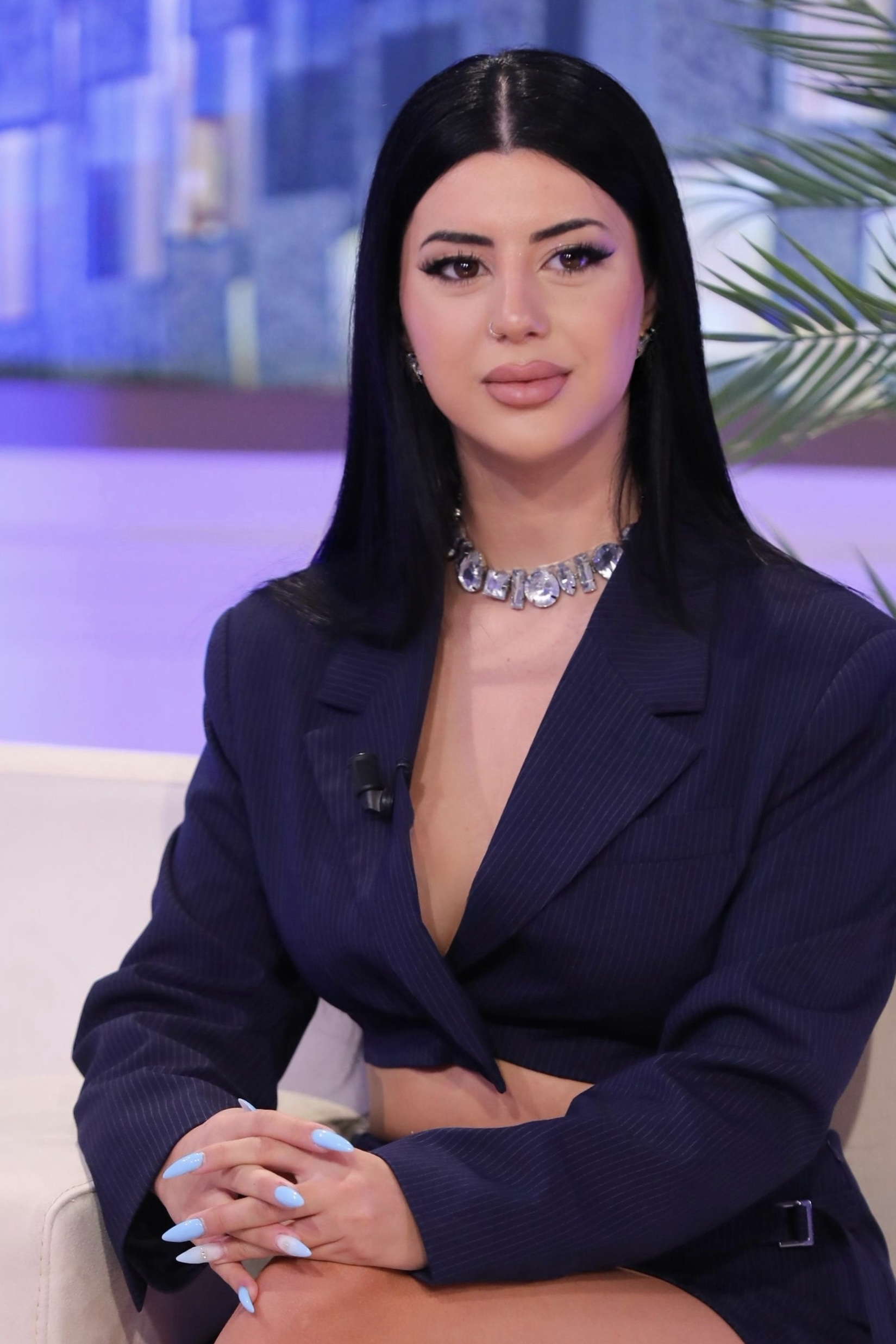
- Rea Nuhu on TV Klan

Background information
- Born: September 21, 2000 (age 25); Athens, Greece
- Origin: Albania
- Genres: Pop; R&B; Afrobeat
- Occupations: Singer; songwriter
- Years active: 2011-present

Rea Nuhu is an Albanian singer and songwriter. She was born in Athens, Greece and raised in Tirana, Albania. Rea Nuhu has participated in several Albanian music festivals, including Kënga Magjike and Festivali i Këngës.

== Life and career ==
Rea Nuhu was born on 21 September 2000 into an Albanian family in the city of Athens, and moved with her family to Tirana, at the age of four. She developed an early interest in music and began performing in televised talent shows such as The Voice Kids Albania and Gjeniu i Vogël, marking her first national appearances.

Nuhu made her professional debut at Kënga Magjike 2017 with the song “Pa Faj”, a collaboration with Albanian artist Kastro Zizo, for which they received the Best Interpretation award. She subsequently released “Dita Ditës” (2018), also with Zizo, followed by her solo entry “Për Mua” at Kënga Magjike 2019

Since 2023, Nuhu has begun writing her own songs. That year, she released the single "A Jam Rrit". In 2024, she participated in Festivali i Këngës 63 with the song "Sot", which she also wrote. In 2025, she released "Harroje" and performed "S'kam Faj" at Kënga Magjike 2025. In addition to her solo work, Nuhu has written and composed music for other Albanian artists.

== Discography ==
=== Singles ===
- 2017: "Pa Faj" (feat Kastro Zizo)
- 2018: "Dita Ditës" (feat Kastro Zizo)
- 2019: "Për Mua"
- 2023: "A Jam Rrit"
- 2024: "Sot"
- 2025: "Harroje"
- 2025: "S'kam Faj"
