= Albania in the Eurovision Song Contest 2024 =

- Eurovision Song Contest 2024
- Participating broadcaster: Radio Televizioni Shqiptar (RTSH)
- Country: Albania
- Selection process: Festivali i Këngës 62
- Selection date: 22 December 2023

Competing entry
- Song: "Titan"
- Artist: Besa
- Songwriters: Besa Kokëdhima; Fabrice "Alias Lj." Grandjean; Gia Koka; Kledi Bahiti

Placement
- Semi-final result: Failed to qualify (15th)

Participation chronology

Albania was represented at the Eurovision Song Contest 2024 with the song "Titan", written by Besa Kokëdhima, Fabrice Grandjean, Gia Koka, and Kledi Bahiti, and performed by Besa herself. The Albanian participating broadcaster, Radio Televizioni Shqiptar (RTSH), selected its entry, originally titled "Zemrën n'dorë", by a separate voting during the traditional national selection competition Festivali i Këngës.

Albania was drawn to compete in the second semi-final of the Eurovision Song Contest which took place on 9 May 2024 and was later selected to perform in position 2. At the end of the show, "Titan" was not announced among the top 10 entries of the second semi-final and hence failed to qualify to compete in the final. It was later revealed that Albania placed fifteenth out of the sixteen participating countries in the semi-final with 14 points.

== Background ==
Prior to the 2024 contest, Radio Televizioni Shqiptar (RTSH) had participated in the Eurovision Song Contest representing Albania 19 times since its first entry in 2004. Its highest placing in the contest, to this point, had been the fifth place, which was achieved in 2012 with the song "Suus" performed by Rona Nishliu. It accomplished its second-highest placing when first participating in 2004, with the song "The Image of You" performed by Anjeza Shahini, finishing in seventh place. During its tenure in the contest, it failed to qualify for the final eight times, with the 2022 entry being the most recent non-qualifier. In 2023, it qualified for the final, ultimately placing 22nd and scoring 76 points with the song "Duje" performed by Albina and Familja Kelmendi.

As part of its duties as participating broadcaster, RTSH broadcasts the event in the country and organises Festivali i Këngës, an annual music competition which has been consistently used as its national selection format for the contest since its 2004 debut. On 30 August 2023, RTSH confirmed its intention to participate in the 2024 contest, and released the trailer for Festivali i Këngës; shortly after, it confirmed it would continue to use the festival as its selection method for the contest.

== Before Eurovision ==
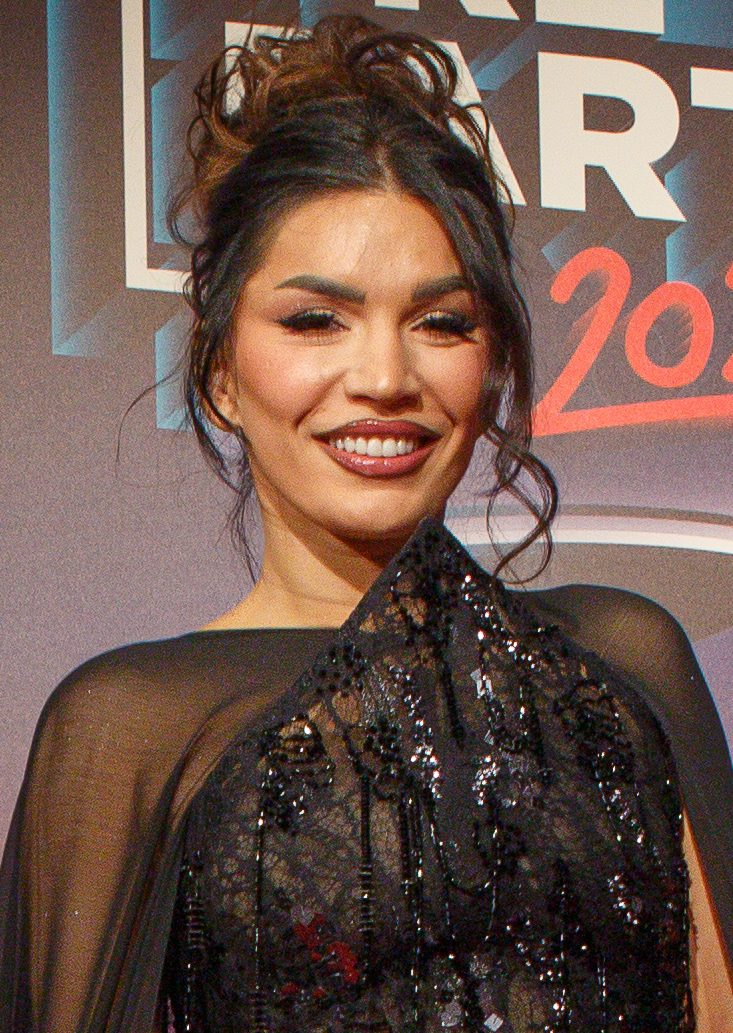
Besa, winner of the public vote Festivali i Këngës 62, at the PrePartyES event in Madrid

=== Festivali i Këngës ===
The Albanian representative in the Eurovision Song Contest 2024 was selected during the 62nd edition of Festivali i Këngës, an annual music competition in Albania organised by RTSH at the Palace of Congresses in Tirana. The event took place between 19 and 22 December 2023 and was hosted by Adriana Matoshi and Kledi Kadiu. The winner of the festival was selected by a jury, while a separate televoting selected Albania's entry for Eurovision. The broadcaster opened an application period for interested artists and composers to submit their applications on 1 September 2023, lasting until 10 October 2023, and ultimately selected 31 contestants. After the entries were announced, three artists withdrew, but were all replaced by other entrants.

==== Final ====
The grand final of Festivali i Këngës was held on 22 December 2023. Besa with "Zemrën n'dorë" emerged as the winner of the public vote and was thus chosen as the Albanian representative for the Eurovision Song Contest 2024.

Key: Selected for Eurovision

Code	Artist	Song
1	Stivi Ushe	"Askush si ty"
2	Besa	"Zemrën n'dorë"
3	Mal Retkoceri	"Çmendur"
4	Eldis Arrnjeti	"Një kujtim"
5	Shpat Deda	"S'mund t'fitoj pa ty"
6	Jehona Ponari	"Evol"
7	PeterPan Quartet	"Edhe një herë"
8	Festina Mejzini	"Melos"
9	Kastro Zizo	"2073"
10	Luan Durmishi	"Përsëritja"
11	Melodajn Mancaku	"Nuk jemi më"
12	Olsi Ballta	"Unë"
13	Andi Tanko	"Herë pas here"
14	Sergio Hajdini	"Uragan"
15	Santino De Bartolo	"Dua të rri me ty"
16	Olimpia Smajlaj	"Asaj"
17	Big Basta and Vesa Luma	"Mbinatyrale"
18	Elsa Lila	"Mars"
19	Jasmina Hako	"Ti"
20	Michela Paluca	"Për veten"
21	Anduel Kovaçi	"Nan'"
22	Kleansa Susaj	"Pikturë"
23	Eden Baja	"Ajër"
24	Erina and the Elementals	"Jetën n'skaj"
25	Irma Lepuri	"Më prit"
26	Arsi Bako	"Zgjohu"
27	Tiri Gjoci	"Në ëndërr"
28	Besa Krasniqi	"Esenciale"
29	Bledi Kaso	"Çdo gjë mbaroi"
30	Troy Band	"Horizonti i ëndrrave"
31	Martina Serreqi	"Vetëm ty"

=== Preparation and promotion ===
In early January 2024, Besa confirmed that "Zemrën n'dorë" would undergo a revamp ahead of the contest, set to be released on 11 March. She later confirmed that the new version would be sung in English under the title "Titan".

As part of the promotion of her participation in the contest, Besa attended the PrePartyES event in Madrid on 30 March 2024, the Barcelona Eurovision Party on 6 April 2024, the London Eurovision Party on 7 April 2024, the Eurovision in Concert event in Amsterdam on 13 April 2024, the Nordic Eurovision Party in Stockholm on 14 April 2024 and the Copenhagen Eurovision Party (Malmöhagen) on 4 May 2024. In addition, she performed "Titan" during a friendly football match between Albania and Chile, held on 22 March 2024 in Parma, Italy, and she performed at the Eurovision Village in Malmö on 7 May 2024.

== At Eurovision ==
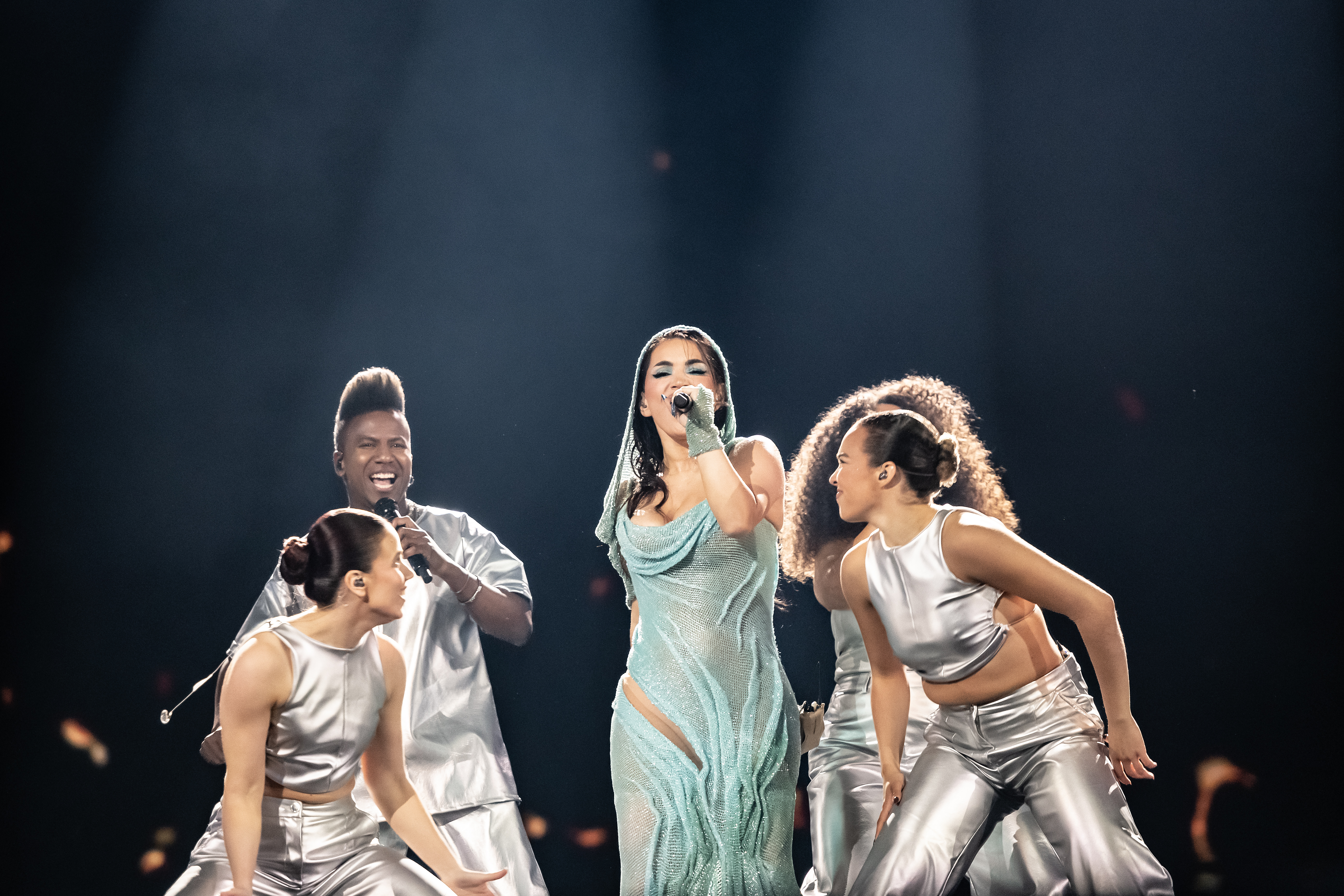
Besa during a dress rehearsal for the second semi-final on 8 May 2024.

The Eurovision Song Contest 2024 took place at the Malmö Arena in Malmö, Sweden, and consisted of two semi-finals held on the respective dates of 7 and 9 May and the final on 11 May 2024. All nations with the exceptions of the host country and the "Big Five" (France, Germany, Italy, Spain and the United Kingdom) were required to qualify from one of two semi-finals in order to compete in the final; the top ten countries from each semi-final progressed to the final. On 30 January 2024, an allocation draw was held to determine which of the two semi-finals, as well as which half of the show, each country would perform in; the European Broadcasting Union (EBU) split up the competing countries into different pots based on voting patterns from previous contests, with countries with favourable voting histories put into the same pot. Albania was scheduled for the first half of the second semi-final. The shows' producers then decided the running order for the semi-finals; Albania was set to perform in position 2.

In Albania, all three shows of the contest were broadcast on RTSH 1, RTSH Muzikë and Radio Tirana, with commentary provided by Andri Xhahu.

=== Performance ===
Besa took part in technical rehearsals on 29 April and 2 May, followed by dress rehearsals on 8 and 9 May. The staging of her performance of "Titan" at the contest was directed by Fredrik "Benke" Rydman (Sweden 2015 and Finland 2023) alongside Reija Wäre (Finland 2013 and 2019) and Melissa Thompson, and saw two backing singers and three supporting dancers.

=== Semi-final ===
Albania performed in position 2, following the entry from Malta and before the entry from Greece. The country was not announced among the top 10 entries in the semi-final and therefore failed to qualify to compete in the final. It was later revealed that Albania placed fifteenth in the semi-final with 14 points.

=== Voting ===
Below is a breakdown of points awarded to and by Albania in the second semi-final and in the final. Voting during the three shows involved each country awarding sets of points from 1-8, 10 and 12: one from their professional jury and the other from televoting in the final vote, while the semi-final vote was based entirely on the vote of the public. The Albanian jury consisted of Julian Bulku, Rael Hoxha, Zana Prela, Erina Seitllari, and Olimpia Smajlaj. In the second semi-final, Albania placed 15th with 14 points. Over the course of the contest, Albania awarded its 12 points to Israel in the second semi-final, and to Switzerland (jury) and Croatia (televote) in the final.

RTSH appointed Andri Xhahu as its spokesperson to announce the Albanian jury's votes in the final.

==== Points awarded to Albania ====
Points awarded to Albania (Semi-final 2)
Score	Televote
12 points	
10 points	
8 points	
7 points	
6 points	
5 points	Greece
4 points	Italy
3 points	Switzerland
2 points	San Marino (Note: San Marino uses a jury in the semi-finals.)
1 point	

==== Points awarded by Albania ====
Points awarded by Albania (Semi-Final 2)
Score	Televote
12 points	Israel
10 points	Netherlands
8 points	Greece
7 points	Georgia
6 points	Armenia
5 points	Switzerland
4 points	Austria
3 points	Estonia
2 points	Belgium
1 point	Norway

Points awarded by Albania (Final)
Score	Televote	Jury
12 points	Croatia	Switzerland
10 points	Israel	Italy
8 points	Italy	Armenia
7 points	Ukraine	Greece
6 points	France	Norway
5 points	Cyprus	Portugal
4 points	Greece	Luxembourg
3 points	Switzerland	Croatia
2 points	Serbia	Slovenia
1 point	Armenia	Serbia

==== Detailed voting results ====
Each participating broadcaster assembles a five-member jury panel consisting of music industry professionals who are citizens of the country they represent. Each jury, and individual jury member, is required to meet a strict set of criteria regarding professional background, as well as diversity in gender and age. No member of a national jury was permitted to be related in any way to any of the competing acts in such a way that they cannot vote impartially and independently. The individual rankings of each jury member as well as the nation's televoting results were released shortly after the grand final.

The following members comprised the Albanian jury:

- Julian Bulku
- Rael Hoxha
- Zana Prela
- Erina Seitllari
- Olimpia Smajlaj

Detailed voting results from Albania (Semi-final 2)
R/O	Country	Televote	
R/O	Country	Rank	Points
01	Malta	14	
02	Albania		
03	Greece	3	8
04	Switzerland	6	5
05	Czechia	11	
06	Austria	7	4
07	Denmark	13	
08	Armenia	5	6
09	Latvia	12	
10	San Marino	15	
11	Georgia	4	7
12	Belgium	9	2
13	Estonia	8	3
14	Israel	1	12
15	Norway	10	1
16	Netherlands	2	10

Detailed voting results from Albania (Final)
R/O	Country	Jury							Televote	
R/O	Country	Juror A	Juror B	Juror C	Juror D	Juror E	Rank	Points	Rank	Points
01	Sweden	12	14	23	12	26	19		12	
02	Ukraine	17	11	22	16	9	14		4	7
03	Germany	18	17	15	13	10	16		16	
04	Luxembourg	6	20	4	6	11	7	4	22	
~~05~~	~~Netherlands~~ ‡ (Note: The Netherlands was disqualified prior to the final.)	~~26~~	~~25~~	~~14~~	~~17~~	~~8~~	~~17~~		N/A	
06	Israel	22	24	26	22	12	23		2	10
07	Lithuania	21	12	20	15	23	21		19	
08	Spain	23	23	18	26	25	25		14	
09	Estonia	7	22	19	19	16	15		23	
10	Ireland	19	21	13	3	17	12		11	
11	Latvia	16	13	21	23	18	22		24	
12	Greece	5	2	12	8	3	4	7	7	4
13	United Kingdom	15	8	8	25	7	11		25	
14	Norway	11	19	2	4	6	5	6	15	
15	Italy	3	6	3	1	2	2	10	3	8
16	Serbia	8	7	9	9	14	10	1	9	2
17	Finland	20	18	11	21	15	20		21	
18	Portugal	2	4	10	10	13	6	5	20	
19	Armenia	4	3	5	5	1	3	8	10	1
20	Cyprus	24	16	24	20	19	24		6	5
21	Switzerland	1	1	1	2	5	1	12	8	3
22	Slovenia	10	5	7	11	20	9	2	17	
23	Croatia	9	9	6	7	21	8	3	1	12
24	Georgia	14	10	16	18	22	18		13	
25	France	13	15	17	14	4	13		5	6
26	Austria	25	26	25	24	24	26		18	
