= Titan (song) =

2023 song by Besa

Single by Besa
- Released: 19 December 2023
- Length: 2:56
- Label: Self-released
- Songwriters: Besa Kokëdhima; Fabrice "Alias Lj." Grandjean; Kledi Bahiti; Gia Koka

Besa singles chronology
"Plastic Heart" (2024)	"Titan" (2024)	"Aman" (2024)

Alternative covers
- Cover of "Zemrën n'dorë"

Music video
- "Titan" on YouTube

Eurovision Song Contest 2024 entry
- Country: Albania
- Artist: Besa
- Language: English
- Composers: Besa Kokëdhima; Fabrice "Alias Lj." Grandjean; Kledi Bahiti
- Lyricist: Gia Koka

Finals performance
- Semi-final result: 15th
- Semi-final points: 14

Entry chronology
- ◄ "Duje" (2023)
- "Zjerm" (2025) ►

Official performance video
- "Titan" (Second Semi-Final) on YouTube

"Titan" (stylised as "TiTAN") is a song by Albanian singer-songwriter Besa. It was composed by Besa, Kledi Bahiti and Fabrice Grandjean, with lyrics by Gia Koka. Self-described as a ballad "with a lot of contrast", it represented Albania in the Eurovision Song Contest 2024, following the selection of the song's Albanian-language version "Zemrën n'dorë" (pronounced [ˈzɛmɾən nˈdɔɾ(ə)]; transl. "Heart in hand") at the 62nd edition of the music competition Festivali i Këngës. At Eurovision, it finished in 15th place with 14 points at semi final two.

== Background and composition ==
After a previous bid to enter the Eurovision Song Contest for Romania in 2009, Kokëdhima was announced as one of the contestants selected to compete in the Albanian pre-selection Festivali i Këngës in 2023. According to the competition's rules, the lyrics of the participating entries had to be in the Albanian language. Kokëdhima took part with the song "Zemrën n'dorë" written by Rozana Radi and Petrit Sefaj, and composed by Kokëdhima and Kledi Bahiti.

In an interview with Eurovision fan site Wiwibloggs, Kokëdhima stated that the song to her was a ballad "with a lot of contrast", further stating that the song "was a genuine emotion. We wrote the song with so much love and we just wanted to express a lot of contrast within a ballad because when you say a ballad, I don't think it's exactly one could imagine... it just goes through waves of tough emotion... like a stormy journey".

On 2 January 2024, Kokëdhima announced that the song would be going through a revamp in order for it to comply with the rules of the Eurovision Song Contest. The English-language revamp "Titan", with lyrics by Gia Koka, was released on 11 March 2024.

== Eurovision Song Contest ==
=== Festivali i Këngës 62 ===
Albania's broadcaster Radio Televizioni Shqiptar (RTSH) officially announced their participation in the Eurovision Song Contest 2024 on 30 August 2023, using its longtime method for choosing the participant, Festivali i Këngës. The edition was the 62nd iteration of the national final. The 31-entry competition was organized into two semi-finals that culminated into one grand final. For this edition of Festivali i Këngës, to select the country's representative, all 31 entries, no matter if they had qualified or not into the grand final, were eligible for representing the country via a televote. The overall winner of the contest did not represent the country unless they had also won the televote as well.

"Zemrën n'dorë" was officially announced to compete in Festivali i Këngës 62 on 17 October 2023. The song competed in the first semi-final on 19 December despite the song having been announced to have an automatic berth in the grand final. In the grand final on 22 December 2023 where all 31 entries were eligible for victory, the song did not win the overall contest, with the victory awarded to Mal Retkoceri, but resulted as the televote winner, gaining the right to represent Albania in the Eurovision Song Contest 2024.

=== At Eurovision ===
The Eurovision Song Contest 2024 took place at the Malmö Arena in Malmö, Sweden, and consisted of two semi-finals held on the respective dates of 7 and 9 May and the final on 11 May 2024. During the allocation draw on 30 January 2024, Albania was drawn to compete in the second semi-final, performing in the first half of the show. To promote the song, Kokëdhima participated in Eurovision pre-parties across Europe.

== Release history ==
Release history and formats for "Zemrën n'dorë"
Country	Date	Format(s)	Label	Ref.
Various	19 December 2023	Digital download; streaming	Self-released	
