= Nân (song) =

2025 song by Alis

Single by Alis
- Language: Albanian (Gheg)
- English title: "Mother"
- Released: 5 December 2025
- Length: 3:09
- Label: Folé Publishing
- Composer: Alis Kallaçi
- Lyricist: Desara Gjini
- Producer: Erjet Barbullushi

Alis singles chronology
"S'ta kam than" (2025)	"Nân" (2025)

Music videos
- "Nân" on YouTube "Nân" (piano version) on YouTube

Eurovision Song Contest 2026 entry
- Country: Albania
- Artist: Alis
- Languages: Albanian (Gheg)
- Composer: Alis Kallaçi
- Lyricist: Desara Gjini

Finals performance
- Semi-final result: 7th
- Semi-final points: 158
- Final result: 13th
- Final points: 145

Entry chronology
- ◄ "Zjerm" (2025)

Official performance video
- "Nân" (second semi-final) on YouTube "Nân" (grand final) on YouTube

"Nân" (Gheg Albanian pronunciation: [nɑ̃ːn]; lit. 'Mother') is a song by Albanian singer and songwriter Alis. It was written by himself alongside Desara Gjini, with production handled by Erjet Barbullushi. The song represented Albania in the Eurovision Song Contest 2026, and finished in thirteenth place at the final.

== Background and composition ==
"Nân" was written by Desara Gjini, composed by Alis Kallaçi and arranged by Erjet Barbullushi. Kallaçi stated that the song came from a dream, in which a distant voice had said: "Goodbye, mother". He described the song as "a ballad for awaiting mothers, for children who leave, and for the eternal love, beyond time and distance".

== Promotion ==
To promote "Nân" before the Eurovision Song Contest 2026, Kallaçi announced his intent to participate in various Eurovision pre-parties. He performed at Melfest WKND 2026 at Nalen in Stockholm on 6 March, Eurovision Party SKG in Thessaloniki on 12 March, the Nordic Eurovision Party 2026 at Rockefeller in Oslo on 21 March, Eurovision in Concert 2026 at AFAS Live Arena in Amsterdam on 11 April, the London Eurovision Festival Fundraiser in London on 17 April, and the London Eurovision Party 2026 at Here at Outernet in London on 19 April 2026.

Prior to his participation in the Eurovision pre-parties, Kallaçi performed on Natsionalnata selektsiya, the Bulgarian national selection for the Eurovision Song Contest 2026. Following the pre-parties, a ceremony was hosted in Tirana by the Albanian broadcaster RTSH and the Austrian Embassy, which was attended by Alis, members of the Albanian delegation, the RTSH Director General Eni Vasili, and the Austrian ambassador, Monika Zach.

== Reception ==
Writing for the Albanian newspaper Sot, Qamil Gjyrezi praised Kallaçi's vocal performance and remarked that the track's "lyrics, rhythm and melody, and orchestration" successfully conveyed "memory and optimistic messages". Eva Frantz of Yle gave the song a rating of nine out of 10, calling it "very dramatic", and applauded Kallaçi's vocals. In the Norwegian newspaper Dagbladet, Ralf Lofstad gave the song a four out of six, describing it as "pompous, Carmina Burana-like, larger than life" song that "sounds powerful without being super cheesy" and commending Kallaçi as "one of the strongest male voices this year". However, despite calling the staging "as serious as the song", he noted that it felt empty due to it being reliant on the screen graphics.

For TV 2, Line Haus gave the entry a three out of six, noting that the song's message is a reminder of "Stefania" by Kalush Orchestra. She praised Kallaçi's vocals and the song's performance by calling it "theatrical and nice", despite criticising the song itself as being "not up to par". She also wrote that part of the staging problem was that Kallaçi's presence was lost because of the sunglasses, and wished that the audience could see his gaze in the performance's entirety "with such a personal and strong song". Jon O'Brien from Vulture ranked the entry 22nd out of the 35 entries, describing it as featuring "military drums, doom-laden church bells, and gothic chants" that could have been taken from The Omen's soundtrack. He concluded that the entry is not an "easy listen".

== Eurovision Song Contest ==
=== Festivali i Këngës 64 ===
On 21 October 2025, Nân was announced as one of the 28 songs selected for Festivali i Këngës 64. The song was made available to the public on 1 December. After participating in the first semi-final on 17 December, the song qualified directly for the final on 20 December, where it finished in first place in both the jury vote and the televote. This victory guaranteed Kallaçi the right to represent Albania in the Eurovision Song Contest 2026 in Vienna.

=== At Eurovision ===
The Eurovision Song Contest 2026 took place at Wiener Stadthalle in Vienna, Austria, and consisted of two semi-finals to be held on the respective dates of 12 and 14 May and the final on 16 May 2026. During the allocation draw held on 12 January 2026, Albania was drawn to compete in the second semi-final, performing in the second half of the show. Kallaçi was later drawn to perform 13th, after United Kingdom's Look Mum No Computer and before Malta's Aidan. His Eurovision performance was staged by Black Skull Creative, and the song’s lyrics were subtitled throughout the performance. "Nân" qualified for the grand final on 16 May, where Kallaçi performed fifth in the lineup. The entry was voted 13th in the overall competition.

== Charts ==
Chart performance for "Nân"
Chart (2026)	Peak position
Greece International (IFPI)	71

== Release history ==
Release dates and formats for "Nân"
Region	Date	Format(s)	Version	Label	Ref.
Various	5 December 2025	Digital download; streaming	Original	Fole Publishing	
Various	29 March 2026	Digital download; streaming	Piano	Fole Publishing	
