= Zjerm (song) =

2024 song by Shkodra Elektronike

Single by Shkodra Elektronike

from the EP Shndrit!
- Language: Gheg Albanian
- English title: "Fire"
- Released: 10 December 2024
- Genre: Electro-folk; folk-pop
- Length: 3:04
- Label: NUDA
- Composers: Beatriçe Gjergji; Kolë Laca
- Lyricists: Beatriçe Gjergji; Lekë Gjeloshi
- Producer: Kolë Laca

Shkodra Elektronike singles chronology
"Vaj Si Kenka Ba Dynjaja" (2023)	"Zjerm" (2024)	"Fosforon" (2025)

Music videos
- "Zjerm" on YouTube "Zjerm" (alternative version) on YouTube

Eurovision Song Contest 2025 entry
- Country: Albania

Finals performance
- Semi-final result: 2nd
- Semi-final points: 122
- Final result: 8th
- Final points: 218

Entry chronology
- ◄ "Titan" (2024)
- "Nân" (2026) ►

Official performance video
- "Zjerm" (first semi-final) on YouTube "Zjerm" (grand final) on YouTube

"Zjerm" (Gheg Albanian pronunciation: [zjeɾm]; lit. 'Fire') is a song by Albanian duo Shkodra Elektronike. It was written by Beatriçe Gjergji, Kolë Laca, and Lekë Gjeloshi, with production handled by Laca, as the lead single from the duo's extended play (EP) Shndrit!. The song represented Albania in the Eurovision Song Contest 2025 and entered the charts in Sweden, Greece, Lithuania and Switzerland.

== Background and composition ==
"Zjerm" was written by Beatriçe Gjergji and Lekë Gjeloshi, composed by Beatriçe Gjergji and arranged by Kolë Laca. Gjergji described the song as a "personal work with lyrics exploring human compassion", also calling it "an Albanian song with a modern touch".

The central motif of the song is Fire, Zjerm, symbolizing power, purification, and renewal. It is described as falling on tribal dances, as a link between tradition and change.

== Reception ==
Professional ratings
Review scores
Source	Rating
Yle	10/10

Rob Picheta of CNN ranked "Zjerm" as the best entry of the 2025 edition of Eurovision, praising its uniqueness and describing it as unlike anything else in the competition, noting the duo's unconventional style and the growing acclaim from fans. Glen Weldon of NPR ranked "Zjerm" among the ten best songs of Eurovision 2025, describing it as a "powerful" Balkan ballad with contrasting vocal performances and "vivid" imagery, and noted its "strong" potential with professional juries. Carl Petersson Moberg of Göteborgs-Posten highlighted the song as a standout in the first semifinal, praising it for offering a "bold and dramatic" folktronica performance that stands apart from "typical pop and novelty" acts, and predicted that Albania would advance and make a strong impact in the final.

Eva Frantz of Yle rated "Zjerm" 10 out of 10, praising its "originality", "bold" fusion of regional folk music with electronic elements, and "compelling" stage presence, and noted that if Finland or Sweden did not win, she hoped Albania would. Jon O'Brien of Vulture ranked "Zjerm" second among all 2025 entries, praising its blend of Middle Eastern strings, tribal rhythms, and distinctive vocals, and described the song as a strong contender capable of securing Albania's best-ever result in the contest. A writer for Spanish El Confidencial described "Zjerm" as a work of "striking" originality and cultural depth, portraying it as more than a song and emphasizing its "powerful" message rooted in tradition and contemporary vision. Kiel Egging of Rolling Stone included the song among the ten Eurovision 2025 acts to watch, describing it as a surprise fan favourite with a super-authentic sound rooted in tradition, and noted its strong potential for a high placement, particularly as it closes the grand final.

=== Betting odds ===
Albania experienced a notable rise in the betting odds of the Eurovision Song Contest, starting at number 21 on 23 February. By 2 March, the country had climbed to number 17, reaching the top ten by 16 March. Albania peaked at number 9 on 23 March and remained in the top ten throughout April, ranking number 10 as of 27 April 2025. In addition, Albania finished number six in the annual OGAE poll, in which Eurovision fan organisations from across Europe within the OGAE network cast their votes.

=== Eurovision media ===
The Wiwi Jury, an international panel of Eurovision reviewers from Wiwibloggs, ranked the song second among the 2025 entries, awarding it an average score of 8.40.

== Eurovision Song Contest ==
=== Festivali i Këngës 63 ===
Albania's broadcaster Radio Televizioni Shqiptar (RTSH) officially announced their participation in the Eurovision Song Contest 2025 on 30 September 2024, using its longtime method for choosing the participant, Festivali i Këngës. The edition was the 63rd iteration of the national final. The 30-entry competition was organized into two semi-finals that culminated into one grand final. The jury selected 15 finalists, with the final result determined by a combination of votes from a professional jury, votes from abroad cast through an online platform (entitled the "diaspora's votes") and SMS voting in Albania and Kosovo.

"Zjerm" was officially announced to compete in Festivali i Këngës 63 on 7 October 2024. The song competed in the first semi-final on 19 December, qualifying for the final, winning both the jury and televote on the final held on 22 December 2024, and gaining the right to represent Albania at Eurovision.

=== At Eurovision ===
The Eurovision Song Contest 2025 took place at St. Jakobshalle in Basel, Switzerland, and consisted of two semi-finals held on the respective dates of 13 and 15 May and the final on 17 May 2025. During the allocation draw held on 28 January 2025, Albania was drawn to compete in the first semi-final, performing in the second half of the show. The performance and, more specifically, Gjergji's costume were inspired by the legend of Rozafa. The song eventually placed second in the semi-final, scoring 122 points and qualified for the Grand Final. In the Grand Final, Zjerm performed in position 26 (last) and placed 8th with 218 points, including 45 points from the professional juries and 173 points from the public, achieving the third-best result ever and best result for Albania since 2012.

== Track listing ==
Digital download/streaming

1. "Zjerm" – 3:04

Digital download/streaming – Clap! Clap! remix

1. "Zjerm" – 3:04
2. "Zjerm" (Clap! Clap! remix) – 4:28

== Charts ==
Chart performance for "Zjerm"
Chart (2025)	Peak position
Greece International (IFPI)	8
Lithuania (AGATA)	29
Sweden Heatseeker (Sverigetopplistan)	13
Switzerland (Schweizer Hitparade)	78

== Release history ==
Release dates and formats for "Zjerm"
Region	Date	Format	Version	Label	Ref.
Various	10 December 2024	Digital download; streaming	Original	Self-released	
Various	2 May 2025	Digital download; streaming	Clap! Clap! remix	Self-released	
