= Ronela Hajati =

Albanian singer and songwriter (born 1989)

- Born: Ronela Hajati; 2 September 1989 (age 36); Tirana, Albania
- Origin: Tirana, Albania
- Genres: Pop
- Occupations: Singer; Songwriter
- Instrument: Vocals
- Years active: 2006–present
- Label: Independent

Ronela Hajati (Albanian: [ɾɔˈnɛla haˈjati]; born 2 September 1989), also known mononymously as Ronela, is an Albanian singer, songwriter. Born and raised in Tirana, she began performing in various singing and dancing competitions as a child before pursuing a career in music. After winning the 60th edition of Festivali i Këngës in 2021, she was designated as Albania's representative for the Eurovision Song Contest 2022.

== Life and career ==
=== 1989–2024: Early life and formations ===
Ronela Hajati was born on 2 September 1989 in the city of Tirana, then part of the People's Socialist Republic, present Albania. Her mother originally hailed from Korçë while her father, Marash Hajati, was from Shkodër. Showing interest in music from a very young age, Hajati studied piano during her elementary school years. She also participated in a series of Albanian singing and dancing competitions. Hajati continued her early career with participations on various music events at different occasions, such as Top Fest and Kënga Magjike. In May 2013, Hajati released her following single "Mala Gata". In late 2013, she participated in the 15th edition of Kënga Magjike with the song "Mos ma lsho", which earned her the Internet Award in the grand final. In December 2015, Hajati released her follow-up single "A do si kjo" and peaked at number 13 in Albania. The succeeding charting single, "Marre", followed in June 2016 and peaked at number 13 as well.

In the span of 2017 and 2018, Hajati released four subsequent singles, including "Mos ik", "Sonte", "Maje men" and "Do ta luj", to commercial success with altogether reaching the top 30 in Albania, resepectively. In December 2018, Hajati successfully participated at Kënga Magjike on its 20th edition with the song "Vuj" eventually finishing in fourth place. In March 2019, following a certain absence, the singer released "Pa dashni" and reached number six in Albania. Her chart success followed into June 2019 with the single "Çohu", a collaboration with Albanian rapper Don Phenom, debuting at number seven on Albania's Top 100. Succeeding the top 10 single "Lage", Hajati scored her first number-one single with the follow-up "MVP" released later that year in September 2019. In July 2020, the Albanian football club KF Tirana approached Hajati to produce and perform the club's anthem "Bardh' e blu" as part of celebrations to mark its centenary year.

=== 2021–present: RRON and Eurovision ===
Hajati announced her debut studio album, RRON, in March 2021. Its lead single, "Prologue", debuted in the same month at number 19 on the Albanian Top 100 and rose to number two a month later. The second single, "Shumë i mirë" which had reached number 15 in late 2021, was nominated for an award at the 2021 Netët e Klipit Shqiptar gala in Ulcinj, Montenegro. Succeeding "Shumë i mirë", the third single, "Aventura" released in May 2021, went on to peak at number three in her native country. In June 2021, Hajati collaborated with Kosovo-Albanian musician Vig Poppa on the album's fourth single, "Alo", which became a top 15 single that month. Released in October 2021, the follow-up "Leje" eventually reached number 13.

In November 2021, the Albanian national broadcaster, Radio Televizioni Shqiptar (RTSH), reported that Hajati was one of 20 artists shortlisted to compete in the 60th edition of Festivali i Këngës with the song "Sekret". During the grand final in December 2021, the singer emerged victorious and was thus announced as Albania's representative for the Eurovision Song Contest 2022 in Turin, Italy. "Sekret" was performed in the first semi-final of the contest on 10 May 2022, but failed to qualify for the final despite being a favourite, finishing in 12th place as Albania's eighth non-qualification in the contest. The song entered the charts in selected countries after its participation in the Eurovision Song Contest, reaching number three in Albania and number 67 in Greece.

On February 20, 2023, Hajati was announced as one of the 106 acts that had been selected for the semi-final stages of Una voce per San Marino, the Eurovision national selection process for San Marino in 2023. She was one of four acts from her semi-final to move to the Second Chance round, later being announced as one of the 22 finalists. Hajati took part in the competition with the Spanish-language song “Salvaje”. Eventually, she did not reach the top 10 of the selection's final.

== Artistry ==
Hajati has been noted for being versatile in her music, style and interpretation. She is primarily characterised as a pop artist, although she has been experimenting with different music genres, including R&B and reggae. She has named American musician Michael Jackson as her idol and one of her biggest musical influences. Hajati is also a fan of Puerto Rican musician Ricky Martin and attended his concert in New York City in October 2021.

== Personal life ==
Hajati is considered a role model for body and self-confidence. She is also regarded as a discreet person in terms of personal life. In 2015, she began a relationship with Albanian musician Young Zerka with whom she collaborated on numerous singles and music videos before breaking up in 2018. As of December 2021, Hajati resides with her mother in Tirana.

== Discography ==
=== EPs ===
- RRON (Part I)
- RRON (Part II)

=== Singles ===
==== As lead artist ====
List of singles as lead artist, with selected chart positions
Title	Year	Peak chart positions		Album
Title	Year	ALB	GRE	Album
"Requiem" (with Orgesa Zajmi)	2006	—N/a	—	Non-album singles
"Me ty nuk shkoj"	2007	—N/a	—	Non-album singles
"Shumë Nice"	2009	—N/a	—	Non-album singles
"Kam frikë te të dua"	2009	—N/a	—	Non-album singles
"Harroje"	2010	—N/a	—	Non-album singles
"Neles" (featuring Visari Skillz)	2011	—N/a	—	Non-album singles
"Nuk ka më kthim"	2012	—N/a	—	Non-album singles
"Mala Gata"	2013	—N/a	—	Non-album singles
"Mos ma lsho"	2013	—N/a	—	Non-album singles
"Veç na" (with Agon Amiga)	2014	—N/a	—	Non-album singles
"A do si kjo"	2015	13	—	Non-album singles
"Amini"	2016	—	—	Non-album singles
"Marre"	2016	13	—	Non-album singles
"Syni i jemi" (with Young Zerka)	2016	—	—	Non-album singles
"Mos ik"	2017	21	—	Non-album singles
"Ladies"	2017	—	—	Non-album singles
"Sonte" (with Lyrical Son)	2017	22	—	Non-album singles
"Diamanta" (with Young Zerka)	2017	—	—	Non-album singles
"Maje men"	2018	24	—	Non-album singles
"Do ta luj"	2018	18	—	Non-album singles
"Vuj"	2018	—	—	Non-album singles
"Pa dashni"	2019	6	—	Non-album singles
"Çohu" (featuring Don Phenom)	2019	7	—	Non-album singles
"Lage"	2019	6	—	Non-album singles
"MVP"	2019	1	—	Non-album singles
"Genjeshtar je X Pare"	2020	16	—	Non-album singles
"Bardh e blu"	2020	—	—	Non-album singles
"Prologue"	2021	2	—	RRON
"Shumë i mirë"	2021	15	—	RRON
"Aventura"	2021	3	—	RRON
"Alo" (featuring Vig Poppa)	2021	14	—	RRON
"Leje" (featuring Klement)	2021	13	—	RRON
"Sekret"	2021	3	67	Non-album singles
"Gips" (with MatoLale)	2022	4	—	RRON
"Caramel"	2022	11	—	RRON
"Valle"	2022	—	—	RRON
"Shtroje me leke"	2023	—	—	
"Si yll"	2023	—	—	
"Shikimet"	2023	—	—	
"Hajde shpirti"	2023	—	—	
"Kaj Kaj" (featuring Skerdi & Emra Brah	2023	—	—	
"—" denotes a recording that did not chart or was not released in that territory.

==== As featured artist ====
List of singles as featured artist
Title	Year	Album
"Ka je 2x" (Adrian Gaxha featuring Ronela Hajati)	2017	Non-album singles
"Dilema" (Don Phenom featuring Ronela Hajati)	2019	Non-album singles
"Papi Chulo" (MatoLale featuring Ronela Hajati)	2022	Non-album singles

=== Songwriter credits ===
List of singles as songwriter
Song	Year	Artist	Album	Ref.
"Ti se din se"	2014	Samanta Karavella	Non-album singles	
"Anna"	2018	Young Zerka	Non-album singles	
"Nuk ma nin"	2018	Young Zerka	Non-album singles	
"Maraz"	2019	Anxhela Peristeri	Non-album singles	
"Lujta"	2020	Anxhela Peristeri	Non-album singles	
"Oj dashni"	2021	Ardit Çuni	Non-album singles	
"Dubai"	2022	Tea Tairović	Balkanija	

Awards and achievements
Preceded by Anxhela Peristeri with "Karma"	Festivali i Këngës; Winner; 2021	Succeeded by Elsa Lila with "Evita"
Preceded by Anxhela Peristeri with "Karma"	Albania in the Eurovision Song Contest; 2022	Succeeded by Albina & Familja Kelmendi with "Duje"
