= Albania in the Eurovision Song Contest 2022 =

- Eurovision Song Contest 2022
- Participating broadcaster: Radio Televizioni Shqiptar (RTSH)
- Country: Albania
- Selection process: Festivali i Këngës 60
- Selection date: 29 December 2021

Competing entry
- Song: "Sekret"
- Artist: Ronela Hajati
- Songwriters: Ronela Hajati; Marko Polo

Placement
- Semi-final result: Failed to qualify (12th)

Participation chronology

Albania was represented at the Eurovision Song Contest 2022 with the song "Sekret" performed by Ronela Hajati. Its entry was selected through the national selection competition Festivali i Këngës organised by Radio Televizioni Shqiptar (RTSH) in December 2021. To this point, the nation had participated in the Eurovision Song Contest 17 times since its first entry in 2004. Albania was drawn to compete in the first semi-final of the Eurovision Song Contest, which took place on 10 May 2022. The nation failed to qualify for the final, placing 12th and scoring 58 points, marking their eighth non-qualification.

== Background ==
Prior to the 2022 contest, Albania participated in the Eurovision Song Contest 17 times since its first entry in 2004. The nation's highest placing in the contest, to this point, was the fifth place, which was achieved in 2012 with the song "Suus" performed by Rona Nishliu. Albania accomplished its second-highest placing when first participating in 2004, with the song "The Image of You" performed by Anjeza Shahini, finishing in seventh place. During its tenure in the contest, the nation failed to qualify for the final seven times, with the 2016 and 2017 entries being the most recent non-qualifiers. After 2017, Albania managed to qualify for the final in the 2018, 2019 and 2021 contests, with Anxhela Peristeri finishing in 21st place with "Karma".

The Albanian national broadcaster Radio Televizioni Shqiptar (RTSH) broadcasts the Eurovision Song Contest within Albania and organises Festivali i Këngës as the national selection format for the contest. Following the nation's debut in 2004, RTSH has consistently selected the Albanian performers and songs through the latter event, which features a competition among artists and songs. The broadcaster confirmed Albania's intention to participate in the 2022 contest on 5 July 2021, with the European Broadcasting Union (EBU) reaffirming the nation's participation on 20 October.

== Before Eurovision ==
=== Festivali i Këngës ===
RTSH organised the 60th edition of Festivali i Këngës in order to determine the Albanian representative for the Eurovision Song Contest 2022. The competition consisted of two semi-finals on 27 and 28 December, respectively, and the final on 29 December 2021. The three live shows were hosted by Albanian presenters Ardit Gjebrea, Isli Islami, Kelvi Kadilli, Xhemi Shehu and singer Jonida Maliqi.

Participants: Established artists
Artist	Song	Songwriter(s)
Alban Ramosaj	"Theje"	Alban Ramosaj; Marko Polo
Denis Skura	"Pse nuk flet, mama?"	Petrit Sinameti
Endri and Stefi Prifti	"Triumfi i jetës"	Jetmir Barbullushi; Zhuliana Jorganxhi
Evi Reçi	"Më duaj"	Flamur Shehu; Zhuliana Jorganxhi
Gjergj Kaçinari	"Në ëndërr mbete ti"	Gjergj Kaçinari
Janex	"Deluzional"	Janex
Kastro Zizo	"Kujë"	Kastro Zizo
Kelly	"Meteor"	Kelly
Mirud	"Për dreq"	Kledi Bahiti; Mirud
Rezarta Smaja	"E jemja nuse"	Shkodra Elektronike
Ronela Hajati	"Sekret"	Marko Polo; Ronela Hajati
Sajmir Çili	"Nën maskë"	Pandi Laço; Sajmir Çili
Shega	"Një"	Giorgio Fusco
Urban Band	"Padrejtësi"	Urban Band

Participants: New artists
Artist	Song	Songwriter(s)
Eldis Arrnjeti	"Refuzoj"	Bujar Daci; Eldis Arrnjeti
Ester Zahiri	"Hiena"	Kledi Bahiti
Kejsi Rustja	"Vallëzoj me ty"	Kejsi Rustja
Olimpia Smajlaj	"Dua"	Genti Lako; Olimpia Smajlaj
Viola Xhemali	"Eja si erë"	Sokol Marsi
Xhuli Pjetraj	"Baladë"	Enis Mullaj; Eriona Rushiti

==== Eurovision night ====
The third and final night of Festivali i Këngës took place on 29 December 2021 at 21:00 (CET). The winner of the competition was determined by the combination of the votes by a seven-member jury panel, consisting of Anxhela Peristeri, Agim Doçi, Anxhela Faber, Osman Mula, Rozana Radi, Olsa Toqi and Olti Curri. Ronela Hajati with the song "Sekret" emerged as the winner and was simultaneously announced as Albania's representative for the Eurovision Song Contest 2022.

Key: Winner Second place Third place

Eurovision night–29 December 2021
R/O	Artist	Song	Place
1	Olimpia Smajlaj	"Dua"	—N/a
2	Denis Skura	"Pse nuk flet, mama?"	—N/a
3	Kelly	"Meteor"	—N/a
4	Sajmir Çili	"Nën maskë"	—N/a
5	Ester Zahiri	"Hiena"	—N/a
6	Kastro Zizo	"Kujë"	—N/a
7	Urban Band	"Padrejtësi"	—N/a
8	Gjergj Kaçinari	"Në ëndërr mbete ti"	—N/a
9	Evi Reçi	"Më duaj"	—N/a
10	Mirud	"Për dreq"	—N/a
11	Endri and Stefi Prifti	"Triumfi i jetës"	—N/a
12	Ronela Hajati	"Sekret"	1
13	Shega	"Një"	—N/a
14	Janex	"Deluzional"	—N/a
15	Alban Ramosaj	"Theje"	2
16	Eldis Arrnjeti	"Refuzoj"	3
17	Rezarta Smaja	"E jemja nuse"	3

=== Promotion ===
A music video for "Sekret" premiered on the official YouTube channel of the Eurovision Song Contest on 4 March 2022. Prior to the scheduled contest, Hajati made several appearances across Europe between March and April 2022 to specifically promote "Sekret", including at the Eurovision-related events in Barcelona, Tel Aviv, Amsterdam and Madrid. She further performed the song live during Romania's national final for the Eurovision Song Contest, Selecția Națională 2022, on 5 March.

== At Eurovision ==
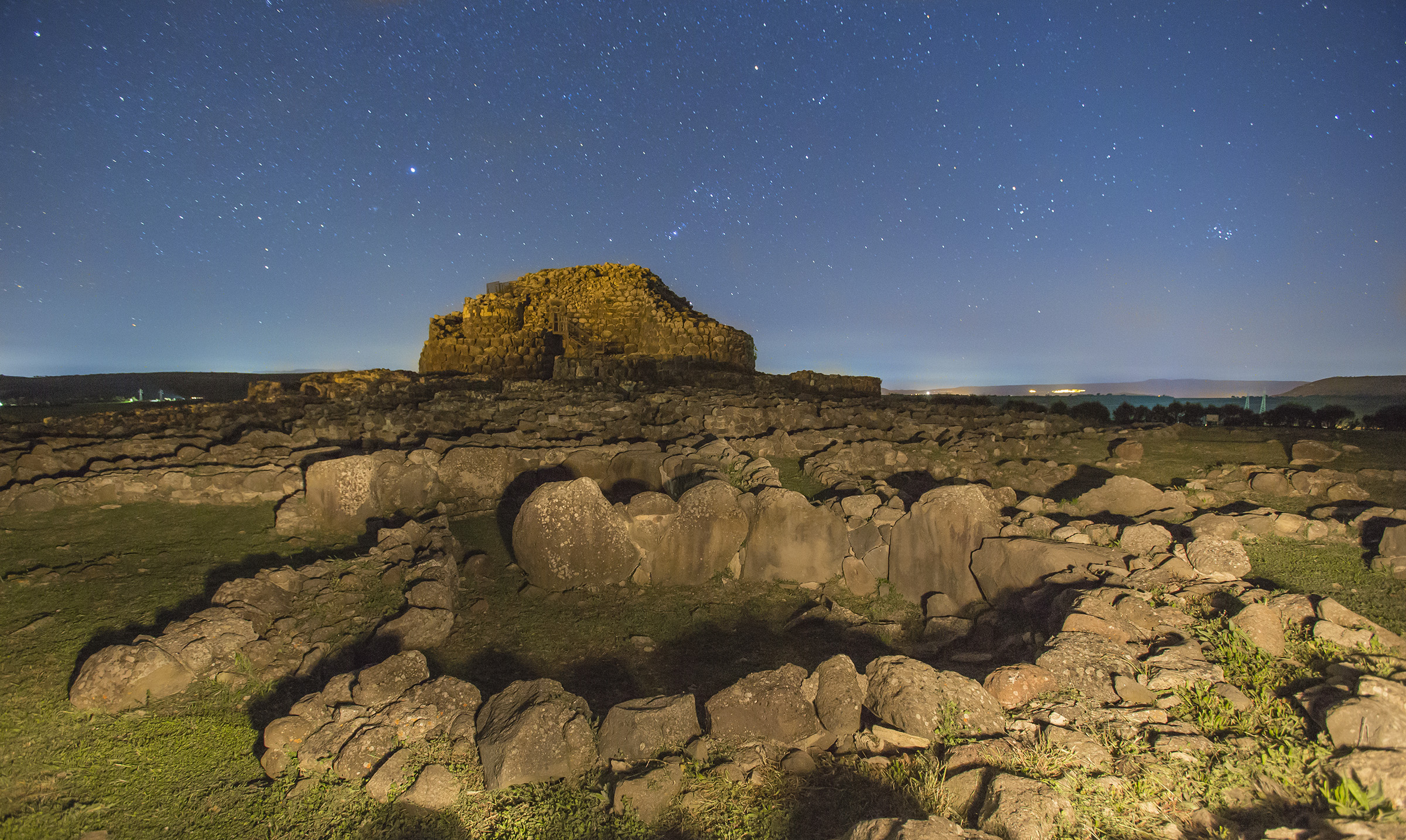
A video postcard introduced Ronela Hajati's performance in the first semi-final of the Eurovision Song Contest 2022. It was filmed in the Italian town of Su Nuraxi within Barumini in Sardinia and featured virtual projections of Hajati across the location.

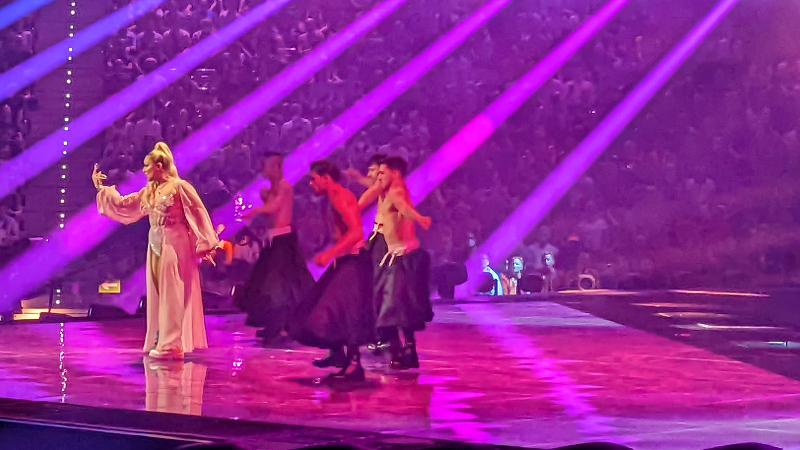
Hajati during the performance of "Sekret" in the first semi-final of the contest on 10 May 2022.

The Eurovision Song Contest 2022 took place at the PalaOlimpico in Turin, Italy, and consisted of two semi-finals held on the respective dates of 10 and 12 May and the grand final on 14 May 2022. According to the Eurovision rules, all participating countries, except the host nation and the "Big Five", consisting of France, Germany, Italy, Spain and the United Kingdom, are required to qualify from one of two semi-finals to compete for the final; the top 10 countries from their respective semi-finals progress to the grand final. Prior to the semi-final allocation draw, the EBU split the competing countries into six different pots based on voting patterns from previous contests, with the aim of reducing the chance of neighbourly voting between countries while also increasing suspense during the voting process.

On 25 January 2022, the allocation draw was held at Palazzo Madama in Turin that placed each nation into one of the two semi-finals and determined which half of the show they would perform in. Therein, it was announced that Albania was scheduled to perform in the first half of the first semi-final of the contest. Once all the competing entries for the 2022 contest had been released, the running order for the semi-finals was decided by the producers of the contest rather than through another draw, to prevent similar songs from being placed next to each other. Hajati took part in technical rehearsals on 30 April and 4 May, followed by dress rehearsals on 9 and 10 May 2022. This included the jury show on 9 May where the professional juries of each country watched and voted on the competing entries. Albania performed in the first semi-final in position one, however, the nation failed to qualify for the contest's final, standing as its eighth non-qualification.

=== Controversy ===
In the aftermath of the first rehearsal, a controversy emerged when footage of Hajati's rehearsal, showing the singer and her accompanying dancers moving with their hands toward their intimate area, disappeared from the Instagram account of the contest. Despite no official statement by the EBU, the contest's social media team replaced and re-uploaded the photo gallery. It was speculated whether the EBU had perceived the performance as too provocative or had required the Albanian delegation to change it prior to the second rehearsal. Subsequently, the Albanian delegation's head of press Ardit Çuni revealed that Hajati would proceed with the same performance.

=== Voting ===
Voting during the three shows of the Eurovision Song Contest involved each nation awarding two sets of points from 1–8, 10 and 12: one from their professional jury and the other from televoting. The tables below visualise a breakdown of points awarded to Albania in the first semi-final of the 2022 contest, as well as by the nation on the latter occasion and in the final. The detailed results of the Albanian jury vote, consisting of a combination between the individual rankings of Aulon Naçi, Ermira Alliu, Kamela Islamaj, Marsela Çibukaj and Roberto Radoja, and televoting are also listed. During the first semi-final, Albania finished 12th with a total of 58 points, receiving 46 televoting points, including 12 from Greece as well as eight from Italy and Switzerland, and only 12 jury points from Greece. The nation awarded its 12 points to Bulgaria (televote) and Ukraine (jury) in the first semi-final and to Greece (televote) and Italy (jury) in the final. For the voting portion of the final, Andri Xhahu served as the Albanian spokesperson announcing the country's jury voting results.

==== Points awarded to Albania ====
Points awarded to Albania (Semi-final 1)
Score	Televote	Jury
12 points	Greece	Greece
10 points		
8 points	Italy; Switzerland	
7 points		
6 points	Slovenia	
5 points	France	
4 points		
3 points		
2 points	Armenia; Austria; Croatia	
1 point	Bulgaria	

==== Points awarded by Albania ====
Points awarded by Albania (Semi-final 1)
Score	Televote	Jury
12 points	Bulgaria	Ukraine
10 points	Greece	Netherlands
8 points	Ukraine	Greece
7 points	Armenia	Armenia
6 points	Croatia	Switzerland
5 points	Portugal	Iceland
4 points	Austria	Portugal
3 points	Netherlands	Croatia
2 points	Norway	Norway
1 point	Lithuania	Bulgaria

Points awarded by Albania (Final)
Score	Televote	Jury
12 points	Greece	Italy
10 points	Ukraine	United Kingdom
8 points	Italy	Sweden
7 points	Spain	Ukraine
6 points	Netherlands	Netherlands
5 points	Estonia	Spain
4 points	United Kingdom	Armenia
3 points	Serbia	Azerbaijan
2 points	Finland	Belgium
1 point	Moldova	Portugal

==== Detailed voting results ====
Detailed voting results from Albania (Semi-final 1)
R/O	Country	Jury							Televote	
R/O	Country	Juror A	Juror B	Juror C	Juror D	Juror E	Rank	Points	Rank	Points
01	Albania									
02	Latvia	15	7	11	15	9	13		16	
03	Lithuania	13	11	7	14	12	14		10	1
04	Switzerland	2	5	6	8	7	5	6	13	
05	Slovenia	16	13	10	16	4	12		15	
06	Ukraine	11	1	1	3	3	1	12	3	8
07	Bulgaria	14	16	16	5	6	10	1	1	12
08	Netherlands	5	4	2	2	2	2	10	8	3
09	Moldova	10	14	14	13	10	15		11	
10	Portugal	8	6	3	6	16	7	4	6	5
11	Croatia	1	10	9	9	13	8	3	5	6
12	Denmark	6	9	13	10	14	11		12	
13	Austria	12	15	15	12	15	16		7	4
14	Iceland	4	12	8	11	1	6	5	14	
15	Greece	7	3	4	1	5	3	8	2	10
16	Norway	9	8	12	7	11	9	2	9	2
17	Armenia	3	2	5	4	8	4	7	4	7

Detailed voting results from Albania (Final)
R/O	Country	Jury							Televote	
R/O	Country	Juror A	Juror B	Juror C	Juror D	Juror E	Rank	Points	Rank	Points
01	Czech Republic	19	14	21	20	18	21		24	
02	Romania	18	25	22	25	22	25		12	
03	Portugal	20	12	13	5	11	10	1	15	
04	Finland	21	19	5	19	20	16		9	2
05	Switzerland	22	11	20	15	13	18		23	
06	France	23	23	18	23	21	24		22	
07	Norway	17	20	15	18	15	20		16	
08	Armenia	8	5	9	9	10	7	4	17	
09	Italy	1	2	2	1	2	1	12	3	8
10	Spain	3	9	10	7	9	6	5	4	7
11	Netherlands	5	6	11	3	3	5	6	5	6
12	Ukraine	4	3	3	6	4	4	7	2	10
13	Germany	9	16	16	10	19	17		20	
14	Lithuania	16	18	6	14	23	15		19	
15	Azerbaijan	6	17	17	12	6	8	3	18	
16	Belgium	13	7	8	11	16	9	2	14	
17	Greece	15	10	19	8	8	11		1	12
18	Iceland	14	21	7	13	14	14		25	
19	Moldova	25	22	14	22	24	23		10	1
20	Sweden	7	1	4	4	5	3	8	11	
21	Australia	12	13	23	16	7	13		21	
22	United Kingdom	2	4	1	2	1	2	10	7	4
23	Poland	11	15	25	21	17	19		13	
24	Serbia	24	24	12	24	25	22		8	3
25	Estonia	10	8	24	17	12	12		6	5
