= Emra Brah =

Albanian singer and songwriter

- Born: Tirana, Albania
- Occupations: singer; songwriter; recording artist
- Years active: 2022–present
- Notable work: Fotografia; Sa net; Ça than
- Relatives: Eglant Brah
- Musical career
- Genres: pop; contemporary Albanian music
- Instruments: vocals
- Labels: Highclass Records, Fullmoon Production

Emra Brah is an Albanian singer and songwriter who entered the Albanian music scene in 2022 and has since released a number of singles and collaborations, several of which have appeared on Albanian music charts.

== Biography ==
Emra Brah made his recording debut in 2022 with the single Ma vie, for which he wrote the lyrics himself. The following year he released the hit Rehat, also featuring his own lyrics. Both tracks were produced by Highclass Records.

In August of that year, he collaborated with Ronela Hajati and Skerdi on the song Kaj Kaj. The music for the track was co-written by Ronela, Emra and Skerdi, with the orchestration produced by Xhoni Beats. Following this release, Emra Brah collaborated with Olsi Bylyku on Vuj Vuj, a song that marked his first appearance on The Top List, a prominent Albanian music chart.

In March 2024, he released Fotografia, a duet with Semi Jaupaj which won first place at the 21st edition of the Albanian Videoclip Festival. The song debuted at number four on The Top List. The lyrics and melody were written by Emra in collaboration with Elgit Doda. The track gained rapid popularity and wide circulation on social media platforms.

Later that year, Emra Brah collaborated with Don Phenom on the song O jet, which also entered The Top List. The track combined melodic elements with rhythmic production and was released during the spring season.

He subsequently returned with solo material with Deti and Ça Than, the latter being a song which addresses themes of emotional absence and relationship separation. It ranked at number 55 on the Top Music chart. His next hit, Sa net, a production involving yet again acclaimed music producer Elgit Doda, featured vocals by Arta Kabashi, with the music video directed by The Claudia, under Fullmoon Production.

His latest release, Vajte, reflects on the pain of separation, conveying a sense of longing and emotional absence. The track is characterized by a restrained vocal delivery and minimalist lyrical structure.

== Musical style ==
Emra Brah’s music frequently explores subjects of love, separation, longing and emotional vulnerability. His songwriting is distinguished by direct language and introspective narratives, commonly set to melodic pop and contemporary Albanian musical arrangements.

== Discography ==
=== Singles ===
Year	Song
2022	"Ma vie"
2022	"Më mungon" (feat. Eglant Brah)
2023	"Rehat"
2023	"Fajtore" (feat. Eglant Brah)
2023	"Kaj Kaj" (feat. Ronela Hajati & Skerdi)
2023	"Vuj Vuj" (feat. Olsi Bylyku)
2023	"Syni"
2024	"Fotografia" (feat. Semi Jaupaj)
2024	"O jet" (feat. Don Phenom)
2024	"Ditë e Natë" (feat. Elgit Doda)
2024	"Alo"
2024	"Deti"
2024	"Thuju" (feat. Elgit Doda, Xhensila)
2024	"Anash" (feat. Bardhi)
2024	"Hajde"
2025	"Trëndafil"
2025	"Falma shpirto" (feat. Semi Jaupaj)
2025	"Jerem" (feat. Don Phenom)
2025	"Dhimbja" (feat. DJ PM, DJ DAGZ)
2025	"Walla" (feat. Ronela Hajati)
2025	"Sa net" (feat. Elgit Doda, Art)
2025	"Japi"
2025	"Dashnia"
2025	"Ça than"
2025	"Vajte"
