= Albania in the Eurovision Song Contest 2021 =

- Eurovision Song Contest 2021
- Participating broadcaster: Radio Televizioni Shqiptar (RTSH)
- Country: Albania
- Selection process: Festivali i Këngës 59
- Selection date: 23 December 2020

Competing entry
- Song: "Karma"
- Artist: Anxhela Peristeri
- Songwriters: Kledi Bahiti; Olti Curri

Placement
- Semi-final result: Qualified (10th, 112 points)
- Final result: 21st, 57 points

Participation chronology

Albania was represented at the Eurovision Song Contest 2021 with the song "Karma" performed by Anxhela Peristeri. Its entry was selected through the national selection competition Festivali i Këngës organised by Radio Televizioni Shqiptar (RTSH) in December 2020. To this point, the nation had participated in the Eurovision Song Contest sixteen times since its first entry in 2004. Prior to the contest, the song was promoted by a music video and various television and radio appearances in Albania, Greece, Kosovo and San Marino.

Albania was drawn to compete in the second semi-final of the Eurovision Song Contest, which took place on 20 May 2021. Performing as number 11, the nation was announced among the top 10 entries of the second semi-final and therefore qualified to compete in the grand final. In the grand final on 22 May 2021, it performed as number two and placed 21st out of the 26 participating countries, scoring 57 points.

== Background ==
Prior to the 2021 contest, Albania had participated in the Eurovision Song Contest sixteen times since its first entry in 2004. The nation's highest placing in the contest, to this point, had been the fifth place, which it achieved in 2012 with the song "Suus" performed by Rona Nishliu. The first entry was performed by Anjeza Shahini with the song "The Image of You" and finished in the seventh place, Albania's second-highest placing to date. During its tenure in the contest, the nation failed to qualify for the final seven times, with both the 2016 and 2017 entries being the most recent non-qualifiers. The country qualified for the final in 2018 and 2019, with Eugent Bushpepa finishing 11th place with "Mall" and Jonida Maliqi placing 17th with "Ktheju tokës", respectively. In 2020, Arilena Ara was set to represent Albania with the song "Fall from the Sky" before the contest's cancellation. In September 2020, the national broadcaster of Albania, Radio Televizioni Shqiptar (RTSH), officially confirmed Albania's participation in the Eurovision Song Contest 2021 in Rotterdam, the Netherlands. RTSH broadcasts the contest within Albania and organises the selection process for the nation's entry. Since its debut in 2004, it has consistently selected its entry through the long-standing competition Festivali i Këngës.

== Before Eurovision ==
=== Festivali i Këngës ===
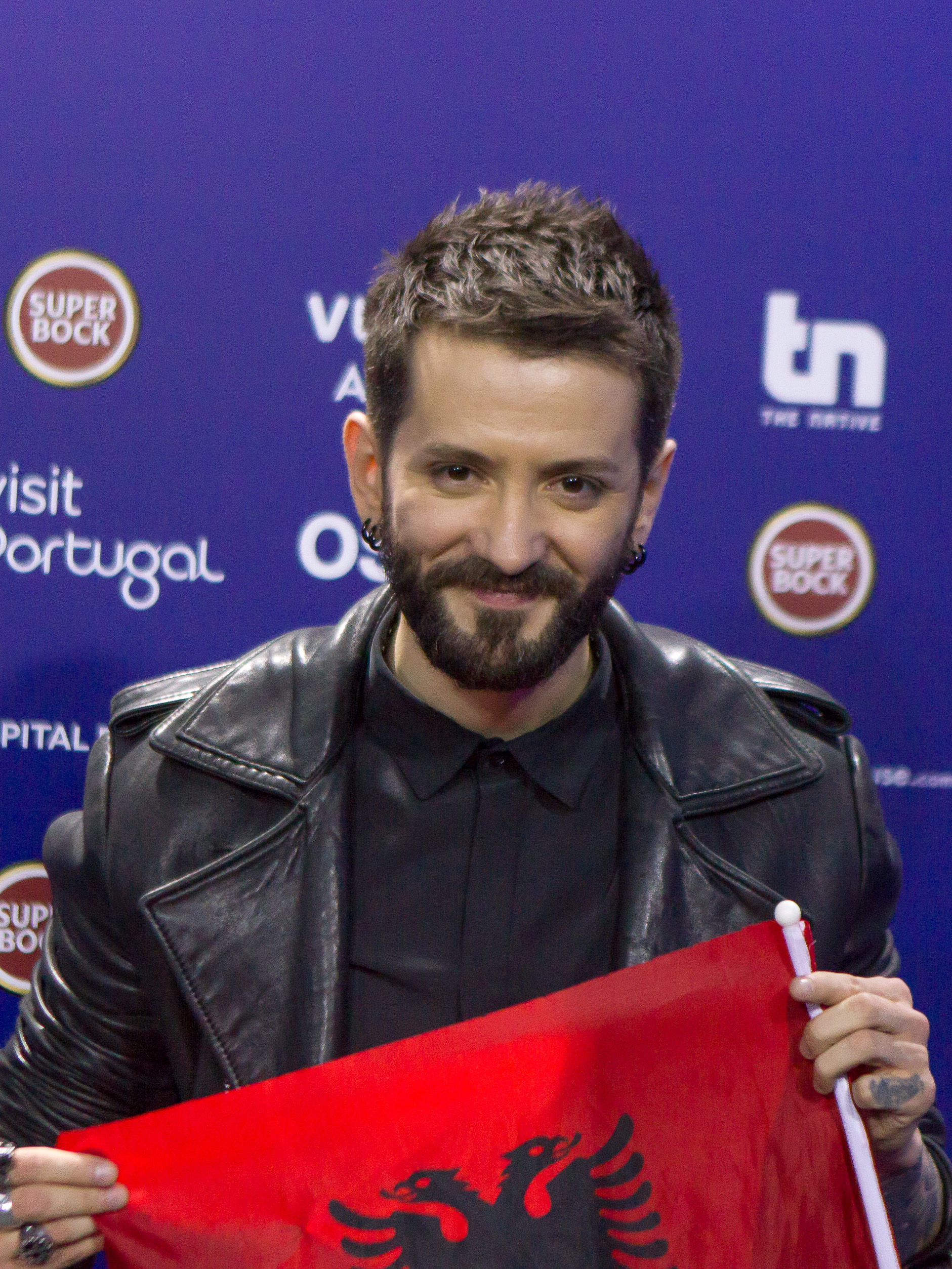
Eugent Bushpepa was part of the artistic committee who selected the 26 entries for the 59th edition of Festivali i Këngës. Bushpepa represented Albania in the Eurovision Song Contest 2018 and finished in 11th place.

Radio Televizioni Shqiptar (RTSH) organised the 59th edition of Festivali i Këngës in order to select the nation's representative for the Eurovision Song Contest 2021. The competition consisted of two semi-finals on 21 and 22 December, respectively, and the final on 23 December 2020. The three shows took place at the Italy Square in Tirana instead of the Palace of Congresses (the regular venue of the festival) due to COVID-19 restrictions, and were hosted by Albanian actress Jonida Vokshi and host Blendi Salaj. From August 2020 to 2 October 2020, interested artists were able to submit their entries to the broadcaster. An artistic committee, consisting of Agim Doçi, Alma Bektashi, Eugent Bushpepa, Jonida Maliqi and Klodian Qafoku, reviewed the received submissions and chose 26 artists and songs shortlisted to compete in the semi-finals of Festivali i Këngës. On 16 November, RTSH released all of the competing songs on its official YouTube channel.

==== Contestants ====
Participants
Artist	Song	Songwriter(s)
Agim Poshka	"Vendi im"	Agim Poshka
Anxhela Peristeri	"Karma"	Kledi Bahiti; Olti Curri
Devis Xherahu	"Peng"	Devis Xherahu; Pandi Laço
Enxhi Nasufi	"Njësoj"	Endri Buka; Enxhi Nasufi
Era Rusi	"Zjarri im"	Enis Mullaj; Era Rusi; Eriona Rushiti
Erik Lloshi	"Jo"	Enis Mullaj; Endrit Mumajesi
Evi Reçi	"Tjerr"	Olsa Toqi; Florian Zyka
Fatos Shabani	"Ty"	Fatos Shabani
Festina Mejzini	"Kush je ti dashuri"	Flamur Shehu; Jorgo Papingji
Florent Abrashi	"Vajzë"	Bledi Shishmani
Franc Koruni	"E morën botën"	Franc Koruni
Gigliola Haveriku	"E lirë"	Endrit Shani; Pandi Laço
Gjergj Kaçinari	"Më jep jetë"	Gjergj Kaçinari; Ilir Krasniqi
Inis Neziri	"Pendesë"	Inis Neziri; Elhaid Cufi
Kamela Islamaj	"Kujtimet s'kanë formë"	Kamela Islamaj; Megi Hasani
Kastro Zizo	"Vallja e jetës"	Klevis Bega
Klint Çollaku	"Do t'ja dal"	Endrit Shani; Pandi Laço
Manjola Nallbani (Note: Prior to the first semi-final, Nallbani announced that she has tested positive for coronavirus disease 2019 (COVID-19) and she has not withdrawn from the competition. However, during the scheduled rehearsals of the competition, she was ultimately forced to withdraw.)	"Ora e jetës"	Eriona Rushiti
Mirud	"Nëse vdes"	Durim Morina
Orgesa Zaimi	"Valixhja e kujtimeve"	Gridi Kraja; Olti Curri
Rosela Gjylbegu	"Vashëzo"	Eriona Rushiti; Rosela Gjylbegu
Sardi Strugaj	"Kam me t'ba me kajt"	Edesa Malci; Sardi Strugaj
Stefan Marena	"Meteor"	Gramoz Kozeli; Klotilda Klo Harka
Viktor Tahiraj	"Nënë"	Viktor Tahiraj
Wendi Mancaku	"Vesi i shpirtit tim"	Rozana Radi
Xhesika Polo	"Më mbron"	Marko Polo; Aleksandër Seitaj

==== Shows ====
===== Semi-finals =====
The two semi-finals of Festivali i Këngës took place on 21 December and 22 December 2020 and were broadcast at 21:00 (CET) on the respective dates. As a result of the ongoing pandemic of coronavirus disease 2019 (COVID-19), the performances of the semi-finals and final were pre-recorded prior to the scheduled dates. During the first semi-final, the competing participants performed the official studio version of their entries, while on the second semi-final, they presented their acoustic versions. Prior to the second semi-final, the votes of an expert jury panel selected eighteen songs to advance to the final.

===== Final =====
The final of Festivali i Këngës took place on 23 December 2020 and was broadcast at 21:00 (CET). 18 songs competed and the winner was determined by the combination of the votes from a seven-member jury panel consisting of Andri Xhahu, Kastriot Çaushi, Prec Zogaj, Rame Lahaj, Robert Radoja, Vasil Tole and Zana Shuteriqi. Before the end of the show, Anxhela Peristeri with "Karma" emerged as the winner of the competition and was simultaneously announced as the country's representative for the Eurovision Song Contest 2021.

Key: Winner Second place Third place

Final – 23 December 2020
R/O	Artist	Song	Result
1	Sardi Strugaj	"Kam me t'ba me kajt"	2
2	Xhesika Polo	"Më mbron"	—N/a
3	Orgesa Zaimi	"Valixhja e kujtimeve"	—N/a
4	Wendi Mancaku	"Vesi i shpirtit tim"	—N/a
5	Era Rusi	"Zjarri im"	—N/a
6	Gjergj Kaçinari	"Më jep jetë"	—N/a
7	Rosela Gjylbegu	"Vashëzo"	—N/a
8	Devis Xherahu	"Peng"	—N/a
9	Mirud	"Nëse vdes"	—N/a
10	Gigliola Haveriku	"E lirë"	—N/a
11	Viktor Tahiraj	"Nënë"	—N/a
12	Kamela Islamaj	"Kujtimet s'kanë formë"	—N/a
13	Florent Abrashi	"Vajzë"	—N/a
14	Inis Neziri	"Pendesë"	—N/a
15	Evi Reçi	"Tjerr"	—N/a
16	Anxhela Peristeri	"Karma"	1
17	Festina Mejzini	"Kush je ti dashuri"	3
18	Kastro Zizo	"Vallja e jetës"	—N/a

=== Promotion ===
A music video for "Karma" premiered on the official YouTube channel of the Eurovision Song Contest on 1 March 2021 at 20:00 (CET). Prior to the scheduled live shows, Peristeri went on to promote the song in her native Albania and Kosovo with television appearances on ABC News, Klan Kosova, Ora News, and Televizioni Klan (TV Klan) as well as for radio interviews on Radio Televizioni 21 (RTV21) and Top Channel. Her promotional phase on European television and radio stations continued on Greek Hellenic Broadcasting Corporation (ERT) and Open TV as well as on Sammarinese RTV. For further promotion, Peristeri also performed the song during the virtual concerts in the British Wiwi Jam, Croatian Adriatic Pre Party and Spanish PrePartyES.

=== Live-on-tape performance ===
As according to the European Broadcasting Union's (EBU) prevention plan against a COVID-19-cancellation of the Eurovision Song Contest 2021, each participant was required to record a live-on-tape performance of their planned entry in a location of their choice prior to the event. The tape was set to be broadcast during the live shows of the contest in case the artist was unable to travel to the contest venue to perform their song due to pandemic restrictions or related reasons. A large portion of the mostly unused live-on-tape performances, including Peristeri's, were unveiled after the contest on 28 May and 29 May 2021 as part of Eurovision Song Celebration shows.

== At Eurovision ==
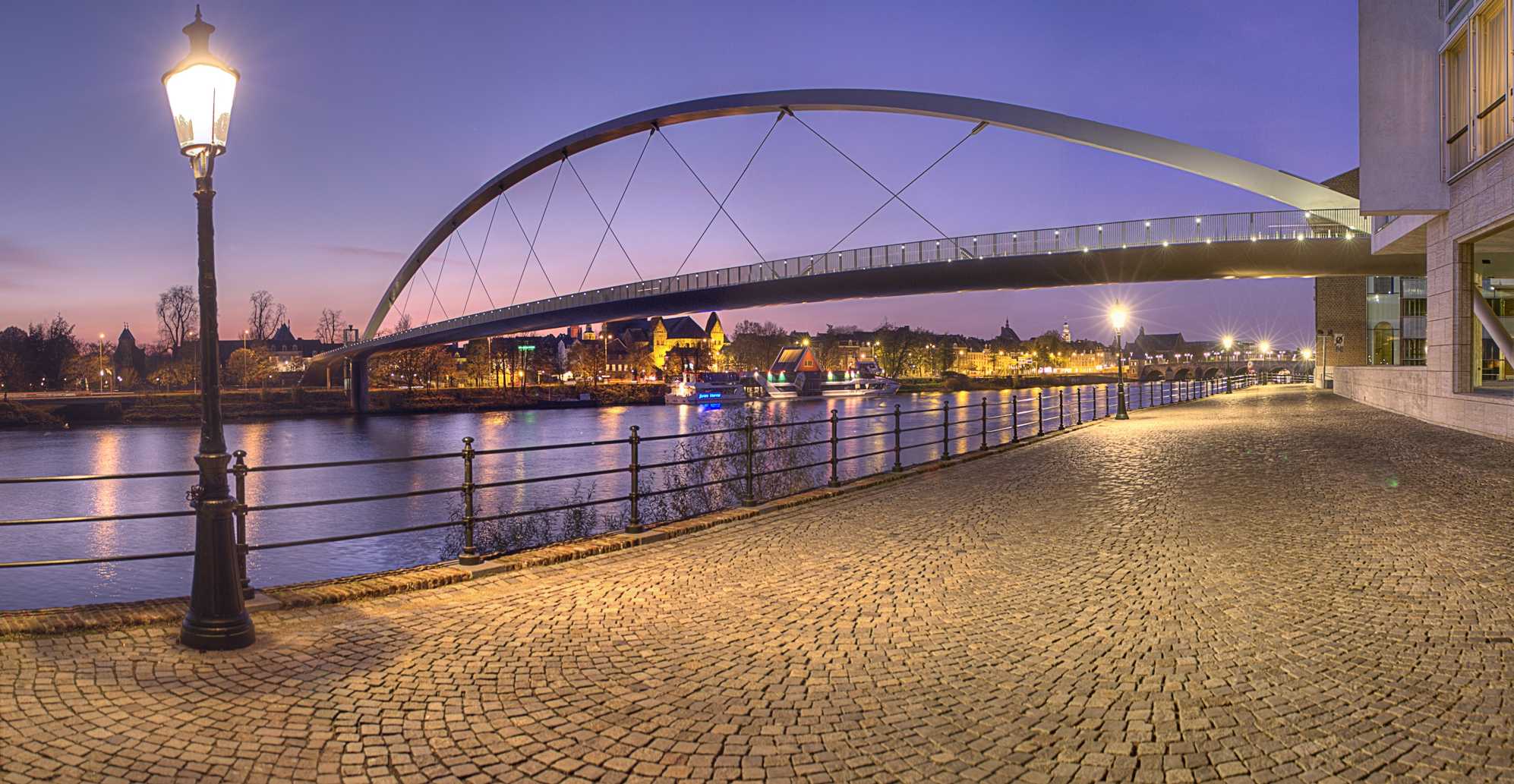
A video postcard introduced Anxhela Peristeri's shows, portraying a small house on the Hoge Brug in Maastricht decorated with personal pictures, a violin and other objects linked to the artist. At the end of the postcard, Peristeri greets the audience while playing a violin solo.

The Eurovision Song Contest 2021 took place at Rotterdam Ahoy in Rotterdam, the Netherlands, and consisted of two semi-finals held on the respective dates of 18 and 20 May and the grand final on 22 May 2021. According to the Eurovision rules, all participating countries, except the host nation and the "Big Five", consisting of France, Germany, Italy, Spain and the United Kingdom, are required to qualify from one of two semi-finals to compete for the final, although the top 10 countries from the respective semi-final progress to the grand final. On 17 November 2020, the European Broadcasting Union (EBU) confirmed that the semi-final allocation draw for the 2021 contest would not be held. Instead, the semi-finals featured the same line-up of countries as determined by the draw for the cancelled 2020 contest, which was held on 28 January 2020 at the Rotterdam City Hall. Albania was drawn to participate in the second half of the second semi-final, which was held on 20 May 2021.

Once all the competing songs for the 2021 contest had been released, the running order for the semi-finals was decided by the producers of the contest rather than through another draw, to prevent similar songs from being placed next to each other. Albania was set to perform at position 11, succeeding Georgia and preceding Portugal. At the end of the semi-final, the nation was announced among the top 10 entries and therefore qualified to compete in the grand final. The results of the show were determined by a 50/50 combination of votes from each participating country's professional jury panel and public televote. Soon after, it was announced that Albania would be performing second in the grand final, succeeding Cyprus and preceding Israel.

=== Voting ===
Voting during the three shows involved each country awarding two sets of points from 1–8, 10 and 12: one from their professional jury and the other from televoting. Each nation's jury consisted of five music industry professionals who are citizens of the country they represent, with a diversity in gender and age represented. The judges assess each entry based on the performances during the second Dress Rehearsal of each show, which takes place the night before each live show, against a set of criteria including vocal capacity; the stage performance; the song's composition and originality; and the overall impression by the act. Jury members may only take part in panel once every three years, and are obliged to confirm that they are not connected to any of the participating acts in a way that would impact their ability to vote impartially. Jury members should also vote independently, with no discussion of their vote permitted with other jury members. The exact composition of the professional jury, and the results of each country's jury and televoting were released after the grand final; the individual results from each jury member were also released in an anonymised form.

The tables below visualise a breakdown of points awarded to Albania in the second semi-final and final of the Eurovision Song Contest 2021, as well as by the nation on both occasions. In the semi-final, Albania finished in 10th place, being awarded a total of 112 points, including 10 by the televoters from Greece and the same number of points by the juries from Denmark. In the final, Albania reached 21st place with 57 points, including 10 by the televoters from Italy and North Macedonia, and 12 by the juries from Malta. The nation's televoters and juries awarded its 12 points to Switzerland on both occasions the semi-final and final.

==== Points awarded to Albania ====
Points awarded to Albania (Semi-final 2)
Score	Televote	Jury
12 points		
10 points	Greece	Denmark
8 points	Switzerland	Portugal
7 points		San Marino
6 points		Greece; Poland
5 points		Iceland; Latvia; Moldova; Switzerland
4 points	Bulgaria	Bulgaria; Finland
3 points	Finland; France	Austria
2 points	Austria; Georgia; Moldova; San Marino	Estonia; Spain
1 point	Portugal; Serbia	Czech Republic; United Kingdom

Points awarded to Albania (Final)
Score	Televote	Jury
12 points		Malta
10 points	Italy; North Macedonia	
8 points		
7 points	Greece; Switzerland	Denmark
6 points		
5 points		
4 points		
3 points		
2 points		San Marino
1 point	Croatia	Netherlands

==== Points awarded by Albania ====
Points awarded by Albania (Semi-final 2)
Score	Televote	Jury
12 points	Switzerland	Switzerland
10 points	Greece	Greece
8 points	Bulgaria	San Marino
7 points	San Marino	Austria
6 points	Portugal	Finland
5 points	Finland	Serbia
4 points	Serbia	Iceland
3 points	Austria	Moldova
2 points	Denmark	Bulgaria
1 point	Iceland	Portugal

Points awarded by Albania (Final)
Score	Televote	Jury
12 points	Switzerland	Switzerland
10 points	Italy	France
8 points	Greece	Malta
7 points	Moldova	Cyprus
6 points	France	Greece
5 points	Bulgaria	San Marino
4 points	Ukraine	Italy
3 points	Finland	Finland
2 points	Cyprus	Azerbaijan
1 point	Sweden	Serbia

==== Detailed voting results ====
The following members comprised the Albanian jury:

- Aurel Thellimi
- Kastriot Tusha
- Kejsi Tola
- Rozana Radi
- Sokol Marsi

Detailed voting results from Albania (Semi-final 2)
R/O	Country	Jury							Televote	
R/O	Country	Juror A	Juror B	Juror C	Juror D	Juror E	Rank	Points	Rank	Points
01	San Marino	3	4	3	5	2	3	8	4	7
02	Estonia	8	16	14	15	12	12		15	
03	Czech Republic	16	11	15	11	14	13		11	
04	Greece	2	3	2	4	4	2	10	2	10
05	Austria	9	5	10	2	3	4	7	8	3
06	Poland	15	15	13	12	15	15		14	
07	Moldova	5	9	5	13	6	8	3	16	
08	Iceland	6	8	4	8	8	7	4	10	1
09	Serbia	7	6	7	7	5	6	5	7	4
10	Georgia	12	13	12	16	13	14		12	
11	Albania									
12	Portugal	11	7	8	10	9	10	1	5	6
13	Bulgaria	4	14	6	9	11	9	2	3	8
14	Finland	13	2	9	3	7	5	6	6	5
15	Latvia	10	10	11	6	10	11		13	
16	Switzerland	1	1	1	1	1	1	12	1	12
17	Denmark	14	12	16	14	16	16		9	2

Detailed voting results from Albania (Final)
R/O	Country	Jury							Televote	
R/O	Country	Juror A	Juror B	Juror C	Juror D	Juror E	Rank	Points	Rank	Points
01	Cyprus	3	5	4	8	6	4	7	9	2
02	Albania									
03	Israel	13	7	9	16	12	12		22	
04	Belgium	23	22	19	25	21	25		25	
05	Russia	15	14	18	13	13	14		17	
06	Malta	7	3	2	3	4	3	8	12	
07	Portugal	21	12	20	15	17	18		23	
08	Serbia	11	11	17	6	7	10	1	16	
09	United Kingdom	24	17	22	24	14	24		20	
10	Greece	4	10	5	4	9	5	6	3	8
11	Switzerland	1	2	1	1	1	1	12	1	12
12	Iceland	8	13	10	11	11	11		21	
13	Spain	12	21	16	18	19	19		18	
14	Moldova	25	24	11	20	23	20		4	7
15	Germany	18	15	12	10	22	13		15	
16	Finland	6	9	7	12	10	8	3	8	3
17	Bulgaria	22	25	8	21	24	17		6	5
18	Lithuania	9	18	15	22	20	16		13	
19	Ukraine	20	16	25	17	15	21		7	4
20	France	2	1	3	2	2	2	10	5	6
21	Azerbaijan	14	6	23	5	8	9	2	14	
22	Norway	19	20	13	23	25	23		19	
23	Netherlands	17	23	24	14	18	22		24	
24	Italy	16	4	21	7	3	7	4	2	10
25	Sweden	10	19	14	19	16	15		10	1
26	San Marino	5	8	6	9	5	6	5	11	
