= Festivali i Këngës 60 =

60th edition of Festivali i Këngës

Dates and venue
- Semi-final 1: 27 December 2021 (Contestants night)
- Semi-final 2: 28 December 2021 (Duet night)
- Final: 29 December 2021 (Eurovision night)
- Venue: Palace of Congresses, Tirana

Production
- Host broadcaster: Radio Televizioni Shqiptar (RTSH)
- Director: Redi Treni
- Presenters: Ardit Gjebrea; Isli Islami; Jonida Maliqi; Kelvi Kadilli; Xhemi Shehu

Participants
- Number of entries: 20

Vote
- Voting system: Jury
- Winning song: "Sekret" by Ronela Hajati

Festivali i Këngës 60 was the 60th edition of the annual Albanian music competition Festivali i Këngës. It was organised by Radio Televizioni Shqiptar (RTSH) at the Palace of Congresses in Tirana, Albania, and consisted of two semi-finals on 27 and 28 December, respectively, and the final on 29 December 2021. The three live shows were directed by Redi Treni and hosted by Ardit Gjebrea, Isli Islami, Jonida Maliqi, Kelvi Kadilli and Xhemi Shehu. Ronela Hajati with the song "Sekret" emerged as the winner of the contest and represented Albania in the Eurovision Song Contest 2022 in Turin, Italy.

== Format ==
The 60th edition of Festivali i Këngës was organised by Radio Televizioni Shqiptar (RTSH) in order to determine Albania's representative for the Eurovision Song Contest 2022 in Turin, Italy. The contest consisted of two semi-finals on 27 and 28 December and the grand final on 29 December 2021. The three live shows were hosted by Albanian presenters Ardit Gjebrea, Isli Islami, Kelvi Kadilli, Xhemi Shehu and singer Jonida Maliqi. In contrast to the prior year's outdoor location due to the ongoing pandemic of COVID-19, the contest was again held as per tradition at the Palace of Congresses in Tirana, Albania.

== Contestants ==
RTSH opened an application period for interested artists and composers to submit their applications between 2 July and 30 September 2021 to the broadcaster before extending it to 15 October. A provisory list of 20 artists followed on 9 November 2021, shortlisted by a jury panel consisting of Gjebrea, Arta Marku, Elton Deda, Klodian Qafoku, Marjan Deda, Redi Treni and Zefina Hasani to compete in the semi-finals of the contest. Their songs were made available to listen to on the RTSH's official YouTube channel on 3 December 2021.

Contestants: Established artists
Artist	Song	Composer(s)	Lyricist(s)
Alban Ramosaj	"Theje"	Marko Polo	Alban Ramosaj
Denis Skura	"Pse nuk flet, mama?"	Petrit Sinameti	
Endri and Stefi Prifti	"Triumfi i jetës"	Jetmir Barbullushi	Zhuliana Jorganxhi
Evi Reçi	"Më duaj"	Flamur Shehu	Zhuliana Jorganxhi
Gjergj Kaçinari	"Në ëndërr mbete ti"	Gjergj Kaçinari	
Janex	"Deluzional"	Janex	
Kastro Zizo	"Kujë"	Kastro Zizo	
Kelly	"Meteor"	Kelly	
Mirud	"Për dreq"	Kledi Bahiti	Mirud
Rezarta Smaja	"E jemja nuse"	Shkodra Elektronike	
Ronela Hajati	"Sekret"	Marko Polo, Ronela Hajati	Ronela Hajati
Sajmir Çili	"Nën maskë"	Sajmir Çili	Pandi Laço
Shega	"Një"	Giorgio Fusco	
Urban Band	"Padrejtësi"	Urban Band	

Contestants: New artists
Artist	Song	Composer(s)	Lyricist(s)
Eldis Arrnjeti	"Refuzoj"	Bujar Daci	Eldis Arrnjeti
Ester Zahiri	"Hiena"	Kledi Bahiti	
Kejsi Rustja	"Vallëzoj me ty"	Kejsi Rustja	
Olimpia Smajlaj	"Dua"	Genti Lako	Olimpia Smajlaj
Viola Xhemali	"Eja si erë"	Sokol Marsi	
Xhuli Pjetraj	"Baladë"	Enis Mullaj	Eriona Rushiti

== Shows ==
=== Contestants night ===
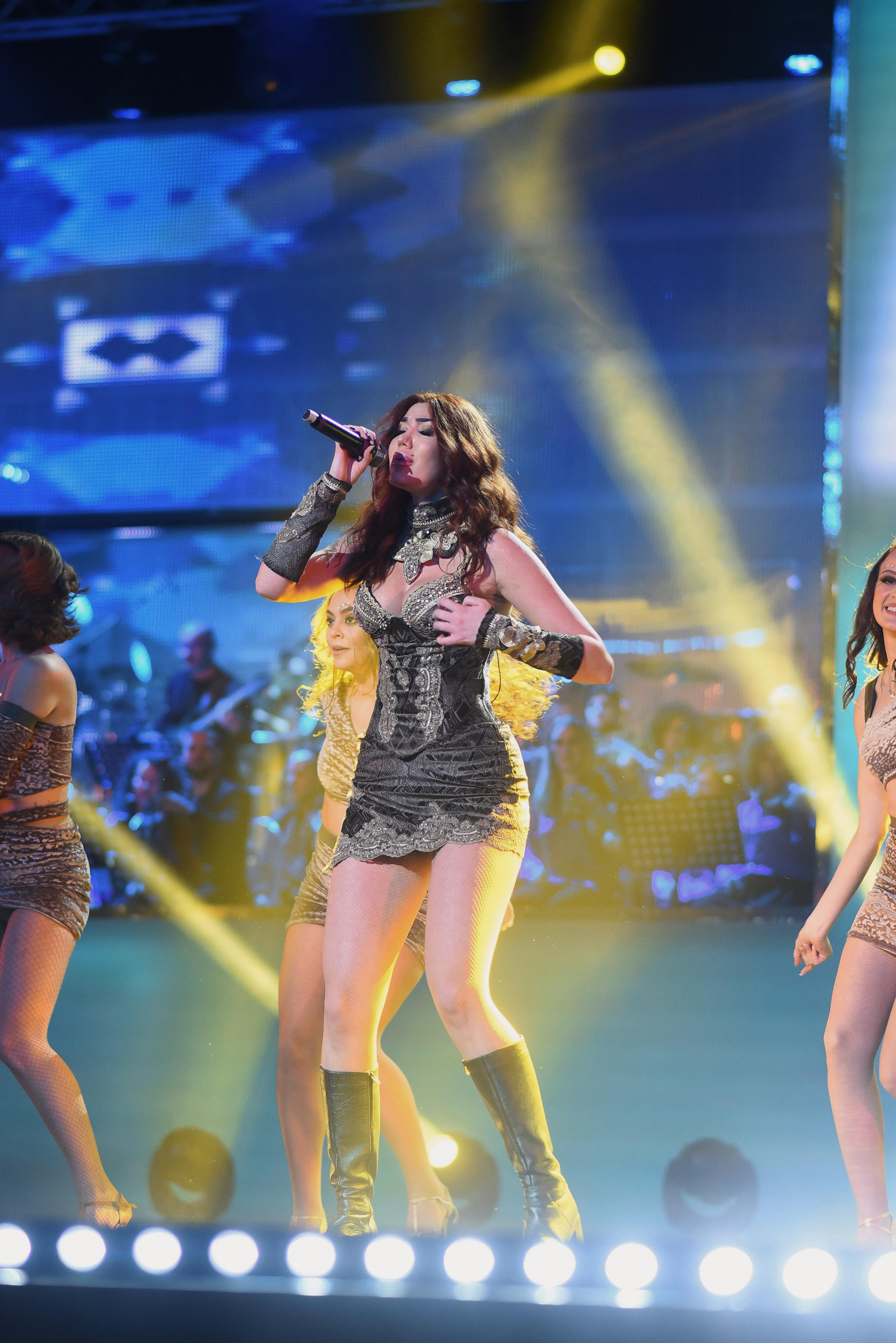
Olimpia Smajlaj from the New artists section performing her song "Dua".

The first show took place on 27 December 2021 at 21:00 (CET). Three out of six contestants of the New artists section were selected by a seven-member jury panel, consisting of Anxhela Peristeri, Agim Doçi, Anxhela Faber, Osman Mula, Rozana Radi, Olsa Toqi and Olti Curri, to advance to the third show of the contest. However, all 14 contestants of the Established artists section advanced to the third show with no qualifications taking place beforehand.

Key: Qualifier

Contestants night–27 December 2021
R/O	Artist	Song
1	Kelly	"Meteor"
2	Mirud	"Për dreq"
3	Urban Band	"Padrejtësi"
4	Evi Reçi	"Më duaj"
5	Kastro Zizo	"Kujë"
6	Ester Zahiri	"Hiena"
7	Viola Xhemali	"Eja si erë"
8	Eldis Arrnjeti	"Refuzoj"
9	Kejsi Rustja	"Vallëzoj me ty"
10	Xhuli Pjetraj	"Baladë"
11	Olimpia Smajlaj	"Dua"
12	Shega	"Një"
13	Gjergj Kaçinari	"Në ëndërr mbete ti"
14	Denis Skura	"Pse nuk flet, mama?"
15	Endri and Stefi Prifti	"Triumfi i jetës"
16	Janex	"Deluzional"
17	Ronela Hajati	"Sekret"
18	Sajmir Çili	"Nën maskë"
19	Rezarta Smaja	"E jemja nuse"
20	Alban Ramosaj	"Theje"

=== Duet night ===
The second show took place on 28 December 2021 at 21:00 (CET). The contestants performed in a duet with previous personalities of Festivali i Këngës except the three newcomers, who presented acoustic versions of their songs.

Duet night–28 December 2021
R/O	Artist(s)	Song
1	Evi Reçi and Liljana Kondakçi	"Më duaj"
2	Denis Skura and Bashkim Alibali	"Pse nuk flet, mama?"
3	Rezarta Smaja and Irma Libohova	"E jemja nuse"
4	Ester Zahiri	"Hiena"
5	Eldis Arrnjeti	"Refuzoj"
6	Olimpia Smajlaj	"Dua"
7	Alban Ramosaj and Gjergj Leka	"Theje"
8	Janex and Pirro Çako	"Deluzional"
9	Shega and Gili	"Një"
10	Kastro Zizo and Justina Aliaj	"Kujë"
11	Urban Band and Kozma Dushi	"Padrejtësi"
12	Endri, Stefi Prifti and Myfarete Laze	"Triumfi i jetës"
13	Mirud and Afërdita Zonja	"Për dreq"
14	Ronela Hajati and Sabri Fejzullahu	"Sekret"
15	Gjergj Kaçinari and Mihrije Braha	"Në ëndërr mbete ti"
16	Kelly and Aleksandër Gjoka	"Meteor"
17	Sajmir Çili and Luan Zhegu	"Nën maskë"

=== Eurovision night ===
The third show took place on 29 December 2021 at 21:00 (CET). For the first time, the contestants were permitted to perform in English or any other language. The winner of the contest was determined by the combination of the votes by the seven-member jury panel of the first show of the contest. Ronela Hajati with the song "Sekret" emerged as the winner and was thus announced as Albania's representative for the Eurovision Song Contest 2022.

Key: Winner Second place Third place

Eurovision night–29 December 2021
R/O	Artist	Song	Place
1	Olimpia Smajlaj	"Dua"	—N/a
2	Denis Skura	"Pse nuk flet, mama?"	—N/a
3	Kelly	"Meteor"	—N/a
4	Sajmir Çili	"Nën maskë"	—N/a
5	Ester Zahiri	"Hiena"	—N/a
6	Kastro Zizo	"Kujë"	—N/a
7	Urban Band	"Padrejtësi"	—N/a
8	Gjergj Kaçinari	"Në ëndërr mbete ti"	—N/a
9	Evi Reçi	"Më duaj"	—N/a
10	Mirud	"Për dreq"	—N/a
11	Endri and Stefi Prifti	"Triumfi i jetës"	—N/a
12	Ronela Hajati	"Sekret"	1
13	Shega	"Një"	—N/a
14	Janex	"Deluzional"	—N/a
15	Alban Ramosaj	"Theje"	2
16	Eldis Arrnjeti	"Refuzoj"	3
17	Rezarta Smaja	"E jemja nuse"	3

== See also ==
- Festivali i Këngës
- Eurovision Song Contest 2022
- Albania in the Eurovision Song Contest 2022
