= Theje =

2021 single by Alban Ramosaj

Single by Alban Ramosaj
- Language: Albanian
- English title: "Break it"
- Released: 3 December 2021
- Label: Independent
- Songwriter: Alban Ramosaj
- Producer: Marko Polo

Alban Ramosaj singles chronology
"Thikat e mia" (2021)	"Theje" (2021)	"Love Letter" (2022)

Music video
- "Theje" on YouTube

"Theje" (Albanian: [ˈθɛjɛ]; transl. "Break it") is a song by Albanian singer and songwriter Alban Ramosaj. The song was written and composed by Ramosaj himself and produced by Marko Polo. It was independently released as a single for digital download and streaming on 3 December 2021. The song is an Albanian-language ethnic ballad combining traditional Albanian instruments and sounds, with its lyrics focusing on the theme of unconditional love. Music critics and fans applauded the song, with praise concentrated on its ethnic nature and instrumentation, as well as Ramosaj's vocal delivery. An accompanying lyric video was premiered to the singer's official YouTube channel simultaneously with the single's release on 3 December.

In late December 2021, Ramosaj competed with "Theje" in the 60th edition of Festivali i Këngës intentionally to represent Albania in the Eurovision Song Contest 2022 in Turin, Italy. During the final, the singer finished in the second place despite being a favourite to win the contest. His performance commenced in black and white and progressed with colours, while the background LED screens displayed thunder and dark imagery.

== Background and release ==
In an interview for Wiwibloggs, after winning the 22nd edition of Kënga Magjike in May 2021, Ramosaj revealed his intention to participate at Festivali i Këngës with the aim to represent Albania at the Eurovision Song Contest 2022. The following November, the Albanian broadcaster Radio Televizioni Shqiptar (RTSH) announced that they had selected Ramosaj among 20 other artists to compete in the live shows of the 60th edition of Festivali i Këngës in late December 2021. Thereafter, "Theje" was independently released as a single in various territories for digital download and streaming on 3 December 2021. An accompanying lyric video was uploaded to Ramosaj's YouTube channel simultaneously with the single's release.

== Composition and reception ==
"Theje", which translated means "Break it", was composed and written by Ramosaj himself, with additional mastering and mixing as well as the production done by Albanian composer Marko Polo. The Albanian-language song is musically an ethnic ballad with a blend of traditional Albanian instruments and sounds. Lyrically, the song touches on the theme of unconditional love and delves into a past relationship of the singer, in which he forgave and continued to offer love and trust to his love interest. Upon its release, "Theje" was met with generally positive reviews from music critics. In a review for ESCUnited conducted by several staff members, "Theje" has been described as a "pleasant" and "epic" ethnic ballad with an "emotional vibe" and a traditional Albanian nature, which was praised by multiple writers. Incorporating what writer William saw as building in "unexpected ways", the song begins into a "mystery surrounding" developing from the verse into two following "epic" choruses before ending "out of nowhere". Writer Tom Padraig of Wiwibloggs similarly expressed praise towards the song's structure as well as Ramosaj's vocal delivery.

== Festivali i Këngës ==
RTSH organised the 60th edition of Festivali i Këngës to select the Albanian representative for the Eurovision Song Contest 2022 in Turin, Italy. The contest consisted of two semi-finals on 27 and 28 December, respectively, and the grand final on 29 December 2021. Ramosaj was officially announced as a selected contestant to participate in the contest in November 2021. During his shows, Ramosaj's performance commenced in black and white with thunder being featured on the LED walls throughout the performance. While music critics were favorable towards both Ramosaj's vocal delivery and the song's ethnic nature, he was regarded by the media as a strong contender and became among the Eurovision fans favourite to win the contest. During the grand final of Festivali i Këngës, the singer eventually ended up finishing in second place. He later expressed his gratitude and thanked his fans for their support through a social media post, while saying that he counts 2021 as his year.

== Personnel ==
Credits adapted from YouTube.

- Alban Ramosaj – composing, choir, guitarist, songwriting, vocals
- Marko Polo – choir, mastering, mixing, producing
- Alex Seitaj – choir
- Kris Breshaj – choir
- Xhesika Polo – choir
- Telando Feto – recorder

== Track listing ==
- Digital download
1. "Theje" – 3:04

== Release history ==
Release dates and formats for "Theje"
Region	Date	Format(s)	Label	Ref.
Various	3 December 2021	Digital download; streaming	Independent	
