= Kënga Magjike 2017 =

19th edition of Kënga Magjike

Dates
- Semi-final 1: 6 December 2017
- Semi-final 2: 7 December 2017
- Final: 9 December 2017

Host
- Venue: Pallati i Kongreseve, Tirana
- Presenter(s): Ardit Gjebrea; Ariola Shehu; Nevina Shtylla
- Host broadcaster: Televizioni Klan (TV Klan)

Participants
- Number of entries: 50

Vote
- Voting system: Each participating contestant awarded 1 to 30 points to their favourite songs.
- Winning song: "E Çmëndur" by Anxhela Peristeri

Kënga Magjike 2017 was the 19th edition of the annual Albanian music competition Kënga Magjike. It was organised by Televizioni Klan (TV Klan) and consisted of two semi-finals held on 6 and 7 December and the final on 9 December 2017 at the Pallati i Kongreseve in Tirana. The three live shows were hosted by Ardit Gjebrea, Ariola Shehu and Nevina Shtylla. Anxhela Peristeri with "E Çmëndur" emerged as the winner of the contest.

== Format ==
The 2017 edition of Kënga Magjike was organised by Televizioni Klan (TV Klan) and also the 19th consecutive edition of the contest. The former consisted of two semi-finals on 6 and 7 December, and the final on 9 December 2017. The three live shows were hosted by Ardit Gjebrea and Albanian presenter Ariola Shehu and Albanian model Nevina Shtylla.

== Semi-finals ==
=== Semi-final 1 ===
The first semi-final took place on 6 December 2017.

Draw	Artist(s)	Song
1	Lind Islami	"Problem"
2	Mishela Rapo	"E doja s'e doja"
3	Alar Band	"Leni ojnat"
4	Akullthyesit	"Clown"
5	Xhesika Polo	"Jetën ma fal"
6	Elson Braha	"23"
7	Stresi and Anxhelo Koçi	"Sa her e don"
8	Rovena Stefa	"Veç një jetë"
9	Çiljeta	"Hajmali"
10	All In Band	"Kundër rrymës"
11	Reinaldo Gaci	"Mos harro"
12	Arjeta Palushaj	"Simbioze"
13	Armenda Gashi	"I Huaj"
14	Toli	"Nuk kam frikë"
15	Serxhio Hajdini	"Pafundësi"
16	Majlinda Cikaqi	"Kam mall"
17	Genti Deda and Dj Rob	"Dashuria"
18	Andrea De Pascalis	"Gocce di spirito"
19	Kelly	"Kur ti buzëqesh"
20	Klint Çollaku	"Më s'më gjën"
21	Gjergj Lekaj	"Ndryshojmë"
22	Mentor Haziri	"Plagë në zemër"
23	Fifi	"Zhurmë"
24	Stine	"Ma more zemrën"
25	Anxhela Peristeri	"E Çmëndur"

=== Semi-final 2 ===
The second semi-final took place on 7 December 2017.

Draw	Artist(s)	Song
1	Classic Boys	"Kalo Kalo"
2	Blerina Braka	"Mirupafshim dashuri"
3	Franc Koruni	"Jemi një lloj"
4	David	"Vetëm ne të dy"
5	Laura Nezha	"Je dashuri"
6	Aurel Thëllimi	"E diel"
7	Valon Shehu	"Ti mos më shaj"
8	Egzona Ademi	"E ndjëj"
9	Fjolla Morina and Blasta	"Shake"
10	Algert Sala	"Buze"
11	Albina Kelmendi	"Si n'fillim"
12	Ergys Shahu	"Fale Zemrën"
13	Albulena Jashari	"Njerëzit"
14	Silvana Rusi	"Ai"
15	John Shahu	"Medicine"
16	Gerard Merdani	"Fjalët më mungojnë"
17	Xhon Jesku	"Je në mua"
18	Klejti Mahmutaj	"Më mbaj"
19	Kastro Zizo and Rea	"Pa faj"
20	Endri and Stefi Prifti	"E prek magjinë"
21	Evi Reçi	"Droëzohu"
22	Rovena Dilo	"Ke lë për mu"
23	NRG Band	"Gocat më Martini"
24	Samanta Karavella	"Humbur"
25	Elhaida Dani	"E Ngrirë"

== Final ==
The grand final took place on the 9th of December 2017. Before the end of the show, Anxhela Peristeri with "E Çmëndur" emerged as the winner of the contest.

Key: Winner Second place Third place

Draw	Artist(s)	Song	Points	Result
1	Alar Band	"Leni ojnat"	354	19
2	Anxhela Peristeri	"E Çmëndur"	999	1
3	Mentor Haziri	"Plagë në zemër"	691	7
4	Valon Shehu	"Ti Mos Më Shaj"	438	14
5	Endri and Stefi Prifti	"E prek magjinë"	743	5
6	John Shahu	"Medicine"	266	20
7	Xhesika Polo	"Jetën ma fal"	360	18
8	Lind Islami	"Problem"	453	13
9	Fifi	"Zhurmë"	878	3
10	NRG Band	"Gocat më Martini"	363	17
11	Stresi and Anxhelo Koçi	"Sa her e don"	493	10
12	Stine	"Ma more zemrën"	459	12
13	Samanta Karavella	"Humbur"	821	4
14	Blerina Braka	"Mirupafshim dashuri"	374	15
15	Rovena Dilo	"Ke lë për mu"	537	9
16	Klint Çollaku	"Më s'më gjën"	739	6
17	Elhaida Dani	"E Ngrirë"	988	2
18	Aurel Thëllimi	"E diel"	481	11
19	Egzona Ademi	"E ndjëj"	371	16
20	Kastro Zizo and Rea	"Pa faj"	623	8
