= Festivali i Këngës 59 =

59th edition of Festivali i Këngës

Dates and venue
- Semi-final 1: 21 December 2020
- Semi-final 2: 22 December 2020
- Final: 23 December 2020
- Venue: Sheshi Italia; Tirana, Albania

Organisation
- Broadcaster: Radio Televizioni Shqiptar (RTSH)
- Presenters: Blendi Salaj; Jonida Vokshi

Participants
- Number of entries: 26

Vote
- Voting system: Jury
- Winning song: "Karma" by Anxhela Peristeri

The Festivali i Këngës 59 was the 59th edition of the annual Albanian music competition Festivali i Këngës. It was organised by Radio Televizioni Shqiptar (RTSH) in an open-air venue at the Sheshi Italia in Tirana, Albania, and consisted of two semi-finals on 21 and 22 December, respectively, and the final on 23 December 2020. The three live shows were hosted by Jonida Vokshi and Blendi Salaj. Due to the pandemic of the coronavirus disease 2019 (COVID-19), the competition did not use the traditional symphonic orchestra and was not held as in the traditional location of the Pallati i Kongreseve but at the Sheshi Italia instead. Anxhela Peristeri with "Karma" emerged as the winner of the contest and represented Albania in the Eurovision Song Contest 2021 in Rotterdam, the Netherlands.

== Background and format ==
The 59th edition of Festivali i Këngës was organised by Radio Televizioni Shqiptar (RTSH) in order to determine Albania's representative for the Eurovision Song Contest 2021. The former consisted of two semi-finals on 21 and 22 December, respectively, and the final on 23 December 2020. The three live shows were hosted by Albanian actress Jonida Vokshi and host Blendi Salaj.

=== Impact of the COVID-19 pandemic ===
For the first time, due to the ongoing pandemic of the coronavirus disease 2019 (COVID-19), the competition did not involve the usual symphonic orchestra and was not held per tradition at the Pallati i Kongreseve but rather in an open-air location at the Sheshi Italia. As a result of the aforementioned, the performances of the semi-final and final were pre-recorded prior to the scheduled dates.

== Contestants ==
Prior to the scheduled event, RTSH opened a submission period for artists and composers to participate in Festivali i Këngës between August and October 2020. On 28 October, it published a provisory list of 26 artists and songs shortlisted by a jury panel, consisting of Agim Doçi, Alma Bektashi, Eugent Bushpepa, Jonida Maliqi and Klodian Qafoku, to compete in the semi-final of the contest. On 16 November 2020, the broadcaster ultimately released all of the competing songs on its official YouTube channel.

Participating entries
Artist	Song	Composer	Lyricist(s)
Agim Poshka	"Vendi im"	Agim Poshka	
Anxhela Peristeri	"Karma"	Kledi Bahiti	Olti Curri
Devis Xherahu	"Peng"	Devis Xherahu	Pandi Laço
Enxhi Nasufi	"Njësoj"	Boocky DJ	Enxhi Nasufi
Era Rusi	"Zjarri im"	Enis Mullaj	Era Rusi, Eriona Rushiti
Erik Lloshi	"Jo"	Enis Mullaj	Endrit Mumajesi
Evi Reçi	"Tjerr"	Olsa Toqi	Florian Zyka
Fatos Shabani	"Ty"	Fatos Shabani	
Festina Mejzini	"Kush je ti dashuri"	Flamur Shehu	Jorgo Papingji
Florent Abrashi	"Vajzë"	Bledi Shishmani	
Franc Koruni	"E morën botën"	Franc Koruni	
Gigliola Haveriku	"E lirë"	Endrit Shani	Atina Laço
Gjergj Kaçinari	"Më jep jetë"	Gjergj Kaçinari	Gjergj Kaçinari, Ilir Krasniqi
Inis Neziri	"Pendesë"	Inis Neziri	Elhaid Cufi
Kamela Islamaj	"Kujtimet s'kanë formë"	Kamela Islamaj	Megi Hasani
Kastro Zizo	"Vallja e jetës"	Kastro Zizo	
Klinti Çollaku	"Do t'ja dal"	Endrit Shani	Pandi Laço
Manjola Nallbani (Note: Prior to the first semi-final, Manjola Nallbani announced that she has tested positive for the coronavirus disease 2019 (COVID-19) and she has not withdrawn from the competition. However, during the scheduled rehearsals of the competition, she was ultimately forced to withdraw.)	"Ora e jetës"	Eriona Rushiti	
Mirud	"Nëse vdes"	Durim Morina	
Orgesa Zaimi	"Valixhja e kujtimeve"	Gridi Kraja	Olti Curri
Rosela Gjylbegu	"Vashëzo"	Eriona Rushiti	Rosela Gjylbegu
Sardi Strugaj	"Kam me t'ba me kajt"	Edesa Malçi	Sardi Strugaj
Stefan Marena	"Meteor"	Gramoz Kozeli	Klotilda Harka
Viktor Tahiraj	"Nënë"	Artur Dhamo	Nexhip Seraj
Wendi Mancaku	"Vesi i shpirtit tim"	Wendi Mancaku	Rozana Radi
Xhesika Polo	"Më mbron"	Marko Polo	Aleksandër Seitaj, Xhesika Polo

== Semi-finals ==
=== Semi-final 1 ===
The first semi-final of Festivali i Këngës took place on 21 December 2020 and was broadcast at 21:00 (CET). During the show, the competing participants performed the official studio versions of their respective entries. Prior to the second semi-final, the selected 18 songs to advance to the final were announced.

Semi-final 1 – 21 December 2020
R/O	Artist	Song
1	Enxhi Nasufi	"Njësoj"
2	Franc Koruni	"E morën botën"
3	Gigliola Haveriku	"E lirë"
4	Orgesa Zaimi	"Valixhja e kujtimeve"
5	Erik Lloshi	"Jo"
6	Viktor Tahiraj	"Nënë"
7	Agim Poshka	"Vendi im"
8	Kastro Zizo	"Vallja e jetës"
9	Wendi Mancaku	"Vesi i shpirtit tim"
10	Gjergj Kaçinari	"Më jep jetë"
11	Era Rusi	"Zjarri im"
12	Devis Xherahu	"Peng"
13	Stefan Marena	"Meteor"
14	Rosela Gjylbegu	"Vashëzo"
15	Sardi Strugaj	"Kam me t'ba me kajt"
16	Xhesika Polo	"Më mbron"
17	Florent Abrashi	"Vajzë"
18	Fatos Shabani	"Ty"
19	Anxhela Peristeri	"Karma"
20	Evi Reçi	"Tjerr"
21	Inis Neziri	"Pendesë"
22	Klinti Çollaku	"Do t'ja dal"
23	Festina Mejzini	"Kush je ti dashuri"
24	Kamela Islamaj	"Kujtimet s'kanë formë"
25	Mirud	"Nëse vdes"

=== Semi-final 2 ===
The second semi-final of Festivali i Këngës took place on 22 December 2020 and was broadcast at 21:00 (CET). During the show, the competing participants performed the acoustic versions of their respective entries.

Semi-final 2 – 22 December 2020
R/O	Artist	Song
1	Florent Abrashi	"Vajzë"
2	Stefan Marena	"Meteor"
3	Wendi Mancaku	"Vesi i shpirtit tim"
4	Viktor Tahiraj	"Nënë"
5	Sardi Strugaj	"Kam me t'ba me kajt"
6	Gigliola Haveriku	"E lirë"
7	Kastro Zizo	"Vallja e jetës"
8	Agim Poshka	"Vendi im"
9	Evi Reçi	"Tjerr"
10	Mirud	"Nëse vdes"
11	Festina Mejzini	"Kush je ti dashuri"
12	Anxhela Peristeri	"Karma"
13	Erik Lloshi	"Jo"
14	Inis Neziri	"Pendesë"
15	Franc Koruni	"E morën botën"
16	Fatos Shabani	"Ty"
17	Era Rusi	"Zjarri im"
18	Klinti Çollaku	"Do t'ja dal"
19	Devis Xherahu	"Peng"
20	Xhesika Polo	"Më mbron"
21	Gjergj Kaçinari	"Më jep jetë"
22	Kamela Islamaj	"Kujtimet s'kanë formë"
23	Enxhi Nasufi	"Njësoj"
24	Rosela Gjylbegu	"Vashëzo"
25	Orgesa Zaimi	"Valixhja e kujtimeve"

== Final ==
The grand final of Festivali i Këngës took place on 23 December 2020 and was broadcast at 21:00 (CET). 18 songs competed and the winner was determined by the combination of the votes from a seven-member jury panel, consisting of Andri Xhahu, Kastriot Çaushi, Prec Zogaj, Rame Lahaj, Robert Radoja, Vasil Tole and Zana Shuteriqi. Before the end of the competition, Anxhela Peristeri with "Karma" emerged as the winner and was simultaneously announced as Albania's representative for the Eurovision Song Contest 2021.

Key: Winner Second place Third place

Final – 23 December 2020
R/O	Artist	Song	Place
1	Sardi Strugaj	"Kam me t'ba me kajt"	2
2	Xhesika Polo	"Më mbron"	—N/a
3	Orgesa Zaimi	"Valixhja e kujtimeve"	—N/a
4	Wendi Mancaku	"Vesi i shpirtit tim"	—N/a
5	Era Rusi	"Zjarri im"	—N/a
6	Gjergj Kaçinari	"Më jep jetë"	—N/a
7	Rosela Gjylbegu	"Vashëzo"	—N/a
8	Devis Xherahu	"Peng"	—N/a
9	Mirud	"Nëse vdes"	—N/a
10	Gigliola Haveriku	"E lirë"	—N/a
11	Viktor Tahiraj	"Nënë"	—N/a
12	Kamela Islamaj	"Kujtimet s'kanë formë"	—N/a
13	Florent Abrashi	"Vajzë"	—N/a
14	Inis Neziri	"Pendesë"	—N/a
15	Evi Reçi	"Tjerr"	—N/a
16	Anxhela Peristeri	"Karma"	1
17	Festina Mejzini	"Kush je ti dashuri"	3
18	Kastro Zizo	"Vallja e jetës"	—N/a

== Broadcasters ==
RTSH provided international live streaming of the two semi-finals and the grand final of Festivali i Këngës through their official YouTube channel with no commentary.

Broadcasting
Country	Show(s)	Broadcaster	Ref
Albania	All shows	Radio Televizioni Shqiptar (RTSH)	
Kosovo	All shows	Radio Televizioni i Kosovës (RTK)	

== See also ==
- Eurovision Song Contest 2021
- Albania in the Eurovision Song Contest 2021
