= Fifi (singer) =

Kosovar singer and songwriter (born 1994)

- Born: Filloreta Raçi; 31 March 1994 (age 32); Herten, Germany
- Occupations: Singer; songwriter
- Years active: 2010 – present
- Musical career
- Label: Onima

Filloreta Raçi (Albanian: [fiɫɔˈɾɛta ˈɾatʃi]; born 31 March 1994), known professionally as Fifi, is a Kosovan singer-songwriter.

== Life and career ==
=== 1994–2021: Early life and formations ===
Fifi was born as Filloreta Raçi on 31 March 1994 in Herten, Germany, into an Albanian family from Ferizaj, Kosovo. Raised in Germany, she became interested in literature and theatre as well as music and attended the music school of Pristina. Forming her early forays into the music industry, Raçi participated in various music and talent competitions, including at Albanians Got Talent, The Voice of Albania and Top Fest. Adopting the stage name Fifi, she debuted with the single "FrymomMu" in 2015. In March 2021, Televizioni Klan (TV Klan) announced Raçi along Albanian singer Bruno as one of the contestants selected to compete in the 22nd edition of Kënga Magjike, marking her fourth consecutive participation at the competition. The singer also appeared on the first season of Albanian reality show Big Brother VIP in the span from October to November 2021.

=== 2022–present: Upcoming album and continued success ===
In October 2022, the Albanian national broadcaster, Radio Televizioni Shqiptar (RTSH), reported that Raçi was one of 26 artists shortlisted to compete in the 61st edition of Festivali i Këngës with the song "Stop". The lead single, "Vëmendje", from her upcoming debut album was released in November 2022.

== Discography ==
=== Singles ===
==== As lead artist ====
Title	Year	Peak chart positions	Album
Title	Year	ALB	Album
"Engjëlli ishe ti"	2010	—N/a	Non-album singles
"Si qiell si diell"	2012	—N/a	Non-album singles
"Thuaj"	2014	—N/a	Non-album singles
"FrymomMu"	2015	—	Non-album singles
"Qysh"	2015	—	Non-album singles
"Kus Kus" (featuring Eri Dee)	2016	—	Non-album singles
"Dashnia nuk osht falas"	2017	—	Non-album singles
"Dope" (with Eri Dee)	2017	31	Non-album singles
"Limonat"	2017	—	Non-album singles
"Zhurmë"	2017	—	Non-album singles
"Nanush 1"	2018	—	Non-album singles
"Nanush 2"	2018	—	Non-album singles
"Habibi" (featuring Lamar)	2018	—	Non-album singles
"Krimineli zemrës"	2018	—	Non-album singles
"Psikopatja jote" (featuring MC Kresha)	2018	—	Non-album singles
"Akoma"	2019	55	Non-album singles
"Zogo"	2019	—	Non-album singles
"Indiane"	2019	15	Non-album singles
"Shqipe"	2019	—	Non-album singles
"Marova"	2019	—	Non-album singles
"Qaj"	2020	24	Non-album singles
"Lezet" (featuring Remzie Osmani)	2020	—	Non-album singles
"A po vjen me mue"	2020	—	Non-album singles
"Pa gajle" (with Young Zerka)	2020	34	Non-album singles
"Përjetësi" (with Ermal Fejzullahu)	2020	—	Non-album singles
"Ninullë dashurie"	2020	5	Non-album singles
"Maniak i dhimbjes"	2021	—	Non-album singles
"Fiksim" (with Bruno)	2021	—	Non-album singles
"Ma more"	2021	—	Non-album singles
"Diell"	2021	4	Non-album singles
"Hana" (featuring DJ PM & DJ Dagz)	2021	12	Non-album singles
"Pikturë" (with Gent Fatali)	2022	—	Non-album singles
"Melaqe" (with Tuna)	2022	—	Non-album singles
"Djegi krejt" (with Gjiko)	2022	—	Non-album singles
"365" (with Gjiko)	2022	—	Non-album singles
"Vëmendje"	2022	—	TBA
"Dehur" (featuring Markel Goga)	2022	—	TBA
"Refuzuar"	2022	—	TBA
"—" denotes a recording that did not chart or was not released in that territory.

=== Songwriter credits ===
List of songs as a songwriter
Song	Year	Artist	Album	Ref.
"Thikat e mia"	2021	Alban Ramosaj	Non-album single	
"Ela"	2022	Andromache	Ela	
