= Thikat e mia =

2021 single by Alban Ramosaj

Single by Alban Ramosaj
- Language: Albanian
- English title: "Knives of Mine"
- Released: 8 May 2021
- Genre: Pop
- Length: 2:49
- Label: Independent
- Songwriters: Alban Ramosaj; Fifi
- Producer: Bruno

Alban Ramosaj singles chronology
"Shpirto" (2021)	"Thikat e mia" (2021)	"Theje" (2021)

Music video
- "Thikat e mia" on YouTube

"Thikat e mia" (Albanian: [ˈθikat ɛ ˈmia]; transl. "Knives of Mine") is a song by Albanian singer and songwriter Alban Ramosaj. The song was written by Ramosaj and Fifi, while produced by Bruno. It was independently released as a single for digital download and streaming on 8 May 2021. Musically, it is a pop song backed by Albanian folk, Spanish flamenco, and Mediterranean components. The Albanian-language lyrics see Ramosaj singing about a perplexing and desperate romance he experienced in Spain. Some music critics met the song with positive reviews, pointing out Ramosaj's vocal delivery and his visual interpretation.

In late May 2021, Ramosaj participated with "Thikat e mia" in the 22nd edition of Kënga Magjike and emerged victorious during the contest's final. An accompanying music video, featuring Ramosaj's well-received performance at Kënga Magjike, was uploaded to his YouTube channel on 9 May. During his performance, the background LED screens displayed Andalusian-inspired imagery, creating a Mediterranean atmosphere.

== Background and composition ==
For the completion of the song, Ramosaj hired the ThreeDots production team, with him contributing to the composition and lyrics of "Thikat e mia" alongside Albanian singers Bruno and Fifi; Bruno also produced the song. In an interview, Ramosaj stated that the song dives into personal experiences and described it as "one of the most difficult songs to write". He further stated that, despite being mostly created in its composition and lyrics, the song had remained uncompleted for a year as a result of personal issues. Musically, "Thikat e mia" is an Albanian-language pop track with a blend of Albanian folk, Spanish flamenco, guitars, and Mediterranean influences. Dedicated to a Spanish girl, "Thikat e mia" lyrically touches on a perplexing and desperate romance, with the title, translated into English as "Knives of Mine", used as a metaphor to describe "anger, jealousy, possessiveness, and repressed" emotions.

== Release and reception ==
Ramosaj independently released "Thikat e mia" as a single for digital download and streaming in various countries on 8 May 2021. An accompanying music video, featuring the singer's performance of the song during his presentation at Kënga Magjike, was uploaded to Ramosaj's YouTube channel the following day on 9 May. Upon its release, the song received positive reviews from two music critics. Deban Aderemi, writing for Wiwibloggs, thought that "when [Ramosaj] belts out those notes and beats his chest, you realise he isn't just unleashing anger and pain.". Aderemi further commended the singer's "stunning" performance, writing that "when he sings, he wears his heart on his sleeve, and transfixes his audience with his hypnotic eyes." "Thikat e mia" was also celebrated by the staff of Illyrian Pirates as a "fantastic" song, highlighting Ramosaj's visual presentation and opining that it accompanies the track well, which, together with the Mediterranean-described setting, emphasises the song's lyrics.

== Kënga Magjike ==
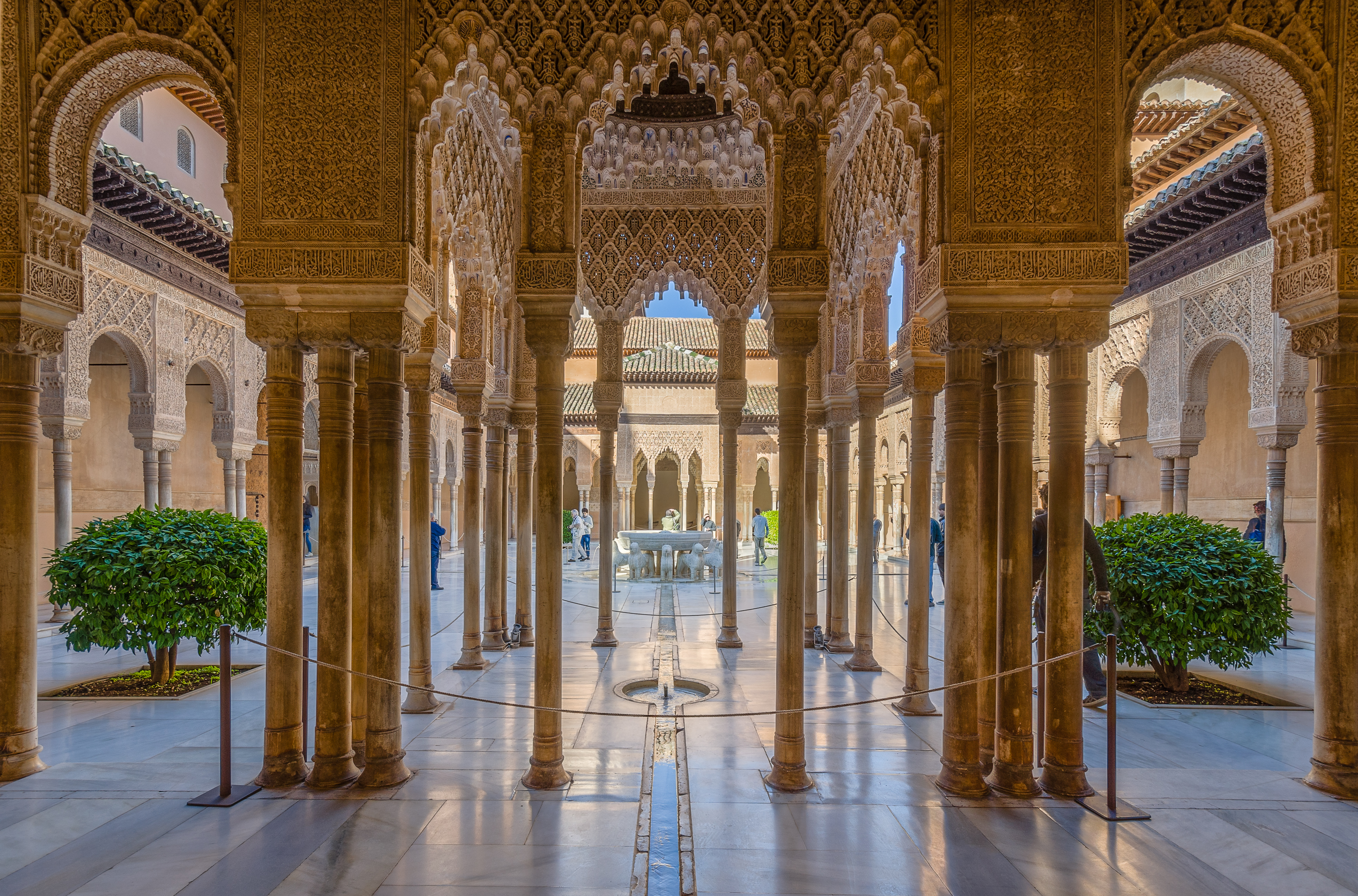
The court of the Lions within the Alhambra Palace in Granada, Spain.

The 22nd edition of Kënga Magjike was organised by the Albanian broadcaster, Televizioni Klan (TV Klan), and consisted of two semi-finals on 26 and 27 May, respectively, and the final on 29 May 2021. In accordance with the contest's tradition, "Thikat e mia" was officially presented before the live shows of Kënga Magjike on the TV Klan's programme E Diela Shqiptare on 9 May 2021. During the grand final on 29 May, the singer emerged as the winner of the contest, receiving the highest number of points from the juries, participants, and public. Onstage, Ramosaj was accompanied by three instrumentalists and four backing vocalists. He performed in front of a red and orange coloured LED wall, while displaying an Andalusian architecture-described image. In a positive review from Illyrian Pirates, the editor felt that the visuals created an Andalusian atmosphere, with the imagery reminding him of the Court of the Lions in the Palace of Alhambra, Granada, Spain.

== Credits and personnel ==
Credits adapted from YouTube.

- Alban Ramosaj – composing, songwriting, vocals
- Bruno – producing
- Fifi – songwriting

== Track listing ==
- Digital download
1. "Thikat e mia" – 2:49

== Release history ==
Release dates and formats for "Thikat e mia"
Region	Date	Format(s)	Label	Ref.
Various	8 May 2021	Digital download; streaming	Independent	
