= E Ngrirë =

Song by Elhaida Dani

Single by Elhaida Dani
- Released: 19 November 2017
- Length: 4:00
- Songwriter: Elhaida Dani
- Producer: Darko Dimitrov

Music video
- "E Ngrirë" on YouTube

"E Ngrirë" (Albanian pronunciation: [ɛ ngɾiɾə]; transl. Frozen) is a song performed by Albanian singer and songwriter Elhaida Dani. The record was released as a single through Epops Music. It was written and composed by herself and produced by Darko Dimitrov for her participation at Kënga Magjike 2017.

Elhaida Dani performed the song for the first time at the 19th edition of Kënga Magjike on 19 November 2017. The song finished second in the grand final of Kënga Magjike 2017 with 988 points. Elhaida additionally released an English version of the song titled "Amazing" with the accompanying music video on 11 December 2017.

== See also ==
- Kënga Magjike 2017
