= Anxhela Peristeri =

Albanian singer and songwriter (born 1986)

- Born: 24 March 1986 (age 40); Korçë, Albania
- Occupations: Singer; songwriter
- Years active: 2001 – present
- Musical career
- Genre: Pop
- Instrument: Violin
- Label: Onima

Anxhela Peristeri (Albanian: [ˈandʒɛla pɛɾiˈstɛɾi]; born 24 March 1986) is an Albanian singer and songwriter. She emerged as the winner of the 19th edition of Kënga Magjike in 2017. After winning the 59th edition of Festivali i Këngës in 2020, Peristeri was designated as the Albanian representative at the Eurovision Song Contest 2021.

== Life and career ==
=== 1986–2015: Early life and career beginnings ===
Anxhela Peristeri was born on 24 March 1986 into an Albanian family of the Eastern Orthodox faith in the city of Korçë, then People's Republic of Albania, present Albania. There, she began to pursue music and attended high school in her elementary years studying violin. Following this, the singer continued her studies and enrolled at the Jordan Misja Lyceum in Tirana. In 2001, Peristeri participated as a contestant in the Miss Albania national pageant in Tirana. Her initial forays into the music industry were in December 2001 as she unsuccessfully took part in the 40th edition of Festivali i Këngës with the song "Vetëm ty të kam". After her graduation in Tirana, Peristeri and her family moved to Thessaloniki, Greece. During an interview in Greece, Peristeri stated that her paternal great-grandfather was Greek, from whom she inherited the surname Peristeri. In another interview in Greece, when asked if she considers herself Greek, she answered that she is Albanian and her connection to Greece comes from a distant ancestor, namely her great-grandfather. Describing her life in the latter country, she had stated that she experienced discrimination because of her Albanian origin.

=== 2016–present: Kënga Magjike and Eurovision ===
From March to June 2016, Peristeri appeared as a contestant on the first season of the Albanian version of Your Face Sounds Familiar and eventually emerged as the winner of the competition. Later that year, in December, the singer participated in Kënga Magjike with the song "Genjështar", finishing in second place. A year later, she returned to compete in Kënga Magjike's 19th edition and resulted as the winner with the song "E çmëndur". Following her victory, her follow-up single, "Shpirti ma di", went on to reach number 73 in Albania. Another charting single, "Pa mua", followed in late 2018 and peaked at number 74 in her native country. A Balkan ballad incorporating Albanian folk elements, "Pa mua" was honored as the Song of the Year by the Akademia Kult at the 2019 Kult Awards, with Peristeri donating her prize winnings to victims of the 2019 Albania earthquake. Peristeri's chart success ensued into September 2019 with the single "Shpirt i bukur", marking her third chart appearance. In December 2019, following a one-year absence, she returned to compete in the 21st edition of Kënga Magjike with the song "Dikush i imi" and eventually finished in third place. Succeeding "Dikush i imi" in January 2020, the follow-up single, "Ata", featuring Kosovo-Albanian singer Sinan Vllasaliu, debuted and peaked at number 100 in Albania.

In October 2020, the Albanian broadcaster, Radio Televizioni Shqiptar (RTSH), announced Peristeri as a selected contestant to compete in the 59th edition of Festivali i Këngës with the song "Karma". During the grand final of Festivali i Këngës in December 2020, the singer resulted as the winner and was thus announced as Albania's representative for the Eurovision Song Contest 2021. In the semi-final of the Eurovision Song Contest in May 2021, Peristeri successfully qualified for the grand final and eventually finished in 21st place. Peristeri's first extended play, N'Tiranë, was released on 29 January 2022. Premiered as the record's lead single, the eponymous single, "N'Tiranë", had reached number 76 on the last issue of Albania's Top 100 chart for the week ending on 5 March 2022.

== Discography ==
=== Albums ===
==== Studio albums ====
- Anxhela për ju (2004)

==== Extended plays ====
- N'Tiranë (2022)

=== Singles ===
==== As lead artist ====
List of singles as lead artist, with selected chart positions
Title	Year	Peak chart positions	Album
Title	Year	BEL (Fl)	Album
"Vetëm ty të kam"	2001	—	Non-album singles
"1001 djem"	2004	—	Anxhela për ju
"Ishe mbret"	2004	—	Anxhela për ju
"Hej ti"	2005	—	Non-album singles
"Sonte dridhuni" (featuring Big Man)	2005	—	Non-album singles
"Kókkini Kárta"	2012	—	Non-album singles
"Femër mediatike"	2014	—	Non-album singles
"Ai po ikën"	2014	—	Non-album singles
"Bye Bye" (featuring Marcus Marchado)	2015	—	Non-album singles
"Si po jetoj"	2015	—	Non-album singles
"Llokum" (featuring Gold AG and Labi)	2016	—	Non-album singles
"Genjështar"	2016	—	Non-album singles
"Qesh" (with Aurel Thëllimi)	2017	—	Non-album singles
"I joti"	2017	—	Non-album singles
"E çmëndur"	2017	—	Non-album singles
"Insanely in Love" (featuring Kastriot Tusha)	2018	—	Non-album singles
"Shpirti ma di"	2018	—	Non-album singles
"Pa mua"	2018	—	Non-album singles
"Muza ime" (with Mateus Frroku)	2019	—	Non-album singles
"Maraz"	2019	—	Non-album singles
"Shpirt i bukur"	2019	—	Non-album singles
"Dikush i imi"	2019	—	Non-album singles
"Ata" (with Sinan Vllasaliu)	2020	—	Non-album singles
"Dashni"	2020	—	Non-album singles
"Lujta"	2020	—	Non-album singles
"Karma"	2021	— (Note: "Karma" did not enter Belgium's Ultratop 50 chart, but was registered on the Ultratip Bubbling Under ranking.)	Non-album singles
"Nuk më doje"	2021	—	Non-album singles
"Puthje" (with Sinan Hoxha)	2021	—	Non-album singles
"Potpuri 2022" (with Yll Demaj)	2021	—	Non-album singles
"N'Tiranë"	2022	—	N'Tiranë
"Adrenalina"	2022	—	Non-album singles
"Habibi" (with Capital T and Mandi)	2022	—	Non-album singles
"Kalimtar"	2022	—	Non-album singles
"Historia" "Nuk dua ta di" "Bota ime" "Me Plígoses" "Para teje" "1960" "FLAKE" "Kaliente" "Sonte Dridhu" "Genjeshtra Dashurie" "Mos me harro"	2024	—	Non-album singles
"Mendova se .."	2025	—	Non-album singles
"—" denotes a recording that did not chart or was not released in that territory.

== Notes ==
Awards and achievements
Preceded by Rozana Radi with "Ma thuaj ti"	Kënga Magjike; Winner; 2017	Succeeded by Flori Mumajesi with "Plas"
Preceded by Arilena Ara with "Shaj"	Festivali i Këngës; Winner; 2020	Succeeded by Ronela Hajati with "Sekret"
Preceded by Arilena Ara with "Fall from the Sky"	Albania in the Eurovision Song Contest; 2021	Succeeded by Ronela Hajati with "Sekret"
