= Kënga Magjike 2021 =

22nd edition of Kënga Magjike

Dates
- Semi-final 1: 26 May 2021
- Semi-final 2: 27 May 2021
- Final: 29 May 2021

Host
- Venue: Tirana, Albania
- Presenter(s): Ardit Gjebrea; Marsela Çibukaj
- Host broadcaster: Televizioni Klan (TV Klan)

Vote
- Winning song: "Thikat e mia" by Alban Ramosaj

Kënga Magjike 2021 was the 22nd edition of the annual Albanian music competition Kënga Magjike. It was organised by Televizioni Klan (TV Klan) and consisted of two semi-finals on 26 and 27 May and the final on 29 May 2021. The three live shows were hosted by Marsela Çibukaj and Ardit Gjebrea. Alban Ramosaj with "Thikat e mia" emerged as the winner of the contest.

== Format ==
The 22nd edition of Kënga Magjike was organised by Televizioni Klan (TV Klan) and consisted of two semi-finals on 26 and 27 May and the final on 29 May 2021. The three live shows were hosted by the contest's founder, Ardit Gjebrea, and Albanian singer Marsela Çibukaj. The participating contestants of Kënga Magjike were divided into two categories, the Big group and the Newcomers group, and presented their entries on the broadcaster's live programme "E Diela Shqiptare" every Sunday from the 21 March 2021. During the broadcast, a jury panel, consisting of Arben Skënderaj, Enkel Demi, Jonida Maliqi, Kozeta Kurti, and Markelian Kapedani, selected the contestants of the Newcomers group.

== Contestants ==
Participants
Big Group
Artist	Song	Composer(s)	Lyricist(s)	Language	Ref.
Alban Ramosaj	"Thikat e mia"	Alban Ramosaj, Bruno	Alban Ramosaj, Fifi	Albanian	
Ardit Stafa and Salije Bajrami	"Larg"				
Aurel Thëllimi	"Fjalët"	Mario Bregu	Aurel Thellimi	Albanian	
Christos Vamos	"To Noumero mou"	Nikos Zisidis	Hermes I. Siokos	Greek	
Eltina Minarolli and Dea Strica	"Me ty"	Dea Strica, Eltina Minarolli	Dea Strica	Albanian	
Eneda Tarifa and Walter Ricci	"Udhëkryq"			Albanian, Italian	
Enxhi Kumria	"Gjithçka"	—		Albanian	
Era Rusi	"Më zëvendësove"	Enis Mullaj	Eriona Rushiti	Albanian	
Erik Lloshi	"Ta vodhën zemrën"	Enis Mullaj	Erik Lloshi	Albanian	
Eliza G	"A un passo dal deserto"	Andrea Amati, Marco Ciappelli, Valerio Carboni	—	Italian	
Eva Alikaj and Clirim Denaj	"Mos më provoko"	Clirim Denaj	Clirim Denaj, Eva Alikaj	Albanian	
Fifi and Bruno	"Fiksim"	Flori Mumajesi	Fifi, Flori Mumajesi	Albanian	
Fitnete Tuda and Don Duli	"Kur buzëqesh"	—		Albanian	
Gerta Mahmutaj	"Havale"	Kledi Bahiti	Endrit Mumajesi	Albanian	
Julian Lekocaj	"Perëndeshë"	Julian Lekocaj		Albanian	
Klajdi Haruni featuring Flori Mumajesi	"E para"				
Krusita	"Kam mbijetu"	Bruno, DJ Vicky	Fifi	Albanian	
Lindita	"Pa t'pa"	Florent Boshnjaku, Lindita		Albanian	
Lorenc Hasrama	"Pafund"	Irkenc Hyka		Albanian	
Marjona Metohu	"A isha"	Bruno	Fifi	Albanian	
Martina Majerle	"Vrijeme je na našoj strani"	Duško Rapotec - Ute	Vjeko Alilović	Croatian	
Nutsa	"We are one"	Misho Sulukhia	—	English	
Orgesa Zaimi	"Nostalgjia"				
Semi Jaupaj	"Jetike"	Flori Mumajesti		Albanian	
Sisma	"Figli della stessa terra"	Sisma		Italian	
Soni Malaj	"Versioni im"	Bruno	Flori Mumajesi	Albanian	
Valeria Altobelli	"Anima semplice"	—		Italian	
Xhesika Polo and Klint Çollaku	"S'më vret"	Marko Polo	Klint Çollaku, Xhesika Polo	Albanian	
Xhon Jesku	"Një tjetër jetë""	Endrit Shani	Florian Zyka	Albanian	
Newcomer Group
Alex Palmieri	"Dangerous Scandalous"			English	
Eldis Arrnjeti	"Akoma jo"	Bujar Daci	Eldis Arrnjeti	Albanian	
Emanuele Picozzi	"Resta"	Valerio Ruotolo, Luca Sepe		Italian	
Gena	"Mëkat"			Albanian	
Gent Disha	"Ma ke bo"			Albanian	
Gerald	"Peng"			Albanian	
Gëzim Hajdari	"A thu kom harru"	Erik Lloshi		Albanian	
Glejvis	"Lot"			Albanian	
Josil	"Zemra e din"	Shkodra Elektronike	Shkodra Elektronike	Albanian	
Klara Doçi	"Veç natën"			Albanian	
Klea Balukja	"Sa vlen"			Albanian	
Kleoniki	"Femer Fire"	Rzon Music, Pllumbeats	Kleoniki, Muma	Albanian, English	
Luisida	"Për ty"			Albanian	
Martina Serreqi	"Hana"	Adrian Hila	Martina Serreqi	Albanian	
Niki	"Zbrazur"			Albanian	
Rilind Alimani	"Pyet zemra"	Rilind Alimani	Vullnet Neziri	Albanian	
Stiv	"Lakmi"	Stiv		Albanian	
Urban Band	"Edhe një natë"	Urban Band		Albanian	

== Semi-finals ==
=== Semi-final 1 ===
The first semi-final of Kënga Magjike took place on 26 May 2021.

=== Semi-final 2 ===
The second semi-final of Kënga Magjike took place on 27 May 2021.

== Final ==
The grand final of Kënga Magjike took place on 29 May 2021 and was broadcast at 21:00 (CET). Before the end of the contest, Alban Ramosaj emerged as the winner with the song "Thikat e mia".

Artist	Song	Artist Vote	Jury Vote	Televote	Total	Place
Alban Ramosaj	Thikat E Mia	941	256	415	1612	1
Klajdi Haruni & Flori Mumajesi	E Para	728	204	126	1058	2
Nutsa	We Are One	735	264	21	1020	3
Eneda Tarifa & Walter Ricci	Udhëkryq	588	202	76	866	4
Fifi & Bruno	Fiksim	644	102	91	837	5
Era Rusi	Më Zëvendësove	605	122	71	798	6
Lindita	Pa T'Pa	606	156	14	776	7
Soni Malaj	Versioni Im	508	126	95	729	8
Lorenc Hasrama	Pafund	542	126	29	697	9
Eliza G	A Un Passo Dal Deserto	505	166	23	694	10
Semi Jaupaj	Jetike	553	98	36	687	11
Marjona Metohu	A Isha	530	70	45	645	12
Orgesa Zaimi	Nostalgjia	375	110	138	623	13
Gerta Mahmutaj	Havale	508	72	23	603	14
Xhesika Polo & Klint Çollaku	S'Më Vret	402	116	74	592	15
Javi Mota	A La Español	436	114	16	566	16
Krusita	Kam Mbijetu	454	70	36	560	17
Kras	Bekuar	362	114	33	509	18
Olivier Kaye	Come To My Window	267	214	16	497	19
Erik Lloshi	Ta Vodhen Zemren	361	60	48	469	20
Valeria Altobelli	Anima Semplice	327	84	43	454	21
Urban Band	Edhe Një Natë	168	208	75	451	22
Sisma	Figli Della Stessa Terra	323	58	31	412	23
Christos Vamos	To Noumero Mou	374	10	13	397	24
Aurel Thëllmi	Fjalët	314	40	30	384	25
Martina Majerle	Vrijeme Je Na Našoj Strani	231	0	14	245	26
Kleoniki	Femer Fire	155	8	75	238	27
Stiv	Lakmi	133	0	95	228	28
Xhon Jesku	Nje Tjeter Jete	126	6	88	220	29
Gent Disha	Ma Ke Bo	130	24	48	202	30
Eldis Arrnjeti	Akoma Jo	84	10	105	199	31
Gent	Ai Ajo	87	42	56	185	32
Niki	Zbrazur	72	6	89	167	33
Gzim Hajdari	A Thu Kom Harru	107	12	40	159	34
Martina Serreqi	Hana	96	0	50	146	35
Eltina Minarolli & Dea Strica	Me Ty	116	0	30	146	35
Josil	Zemra E Din	80	30	34	144	37
Enxhi Kumrija	Gjithçka	137	0	6	143	38
Andrea Vathaj	Vai Col Tempo	70	16	37	123	39
Fitnete Tuda & Don Duli	Kur Buzëqesh	86	14	22	122	40
Julian Lekocaj	Perëndeshë	92	0	21	113	41
Eva Alikaj and Çlirim Denaj	Mos Më Provoko	28	0	23	51	42
