= Sekret =

2022 single by Ronela Hajati

Single by Ronela Hajati
- Language: Albanian; English
- Released: 5 March 2022
- Genre: Folk; funk; moombahton; pop; reggaeton
- Length: 3:01
- Label: Independent
- Songwriter: Ronela Hajati
- Producer: Marko Polo

Ronela Hajati singles chronology
| "Leje" (2021) | "Sekret" (2022) | "Gips" (2022) |

Alternative cover
- First edition cover

Music video
- "Sekret" on YouTube

Eurovision Song Contest 2022 entry
- Country: Albania
- Artist: Ronela Hajati
- Languages: Albanian; English; Spanish

Finals performance
- Semi-final result: 12th
- Semi-final points: 58

Entry chronology
- ◄ "Karma" (2021)
- "Duje" (2023) ►

"Sekret" (Albanian: [sɛˈkɾɛt]; transl. "Secret") is a song by Albanian singer-songwriter Ronela Hajati. It was written by Hajati herself and produced by Marko Polo. Musically, it is an Albanian-language upbeat "ethno" pop song with folk instrumentation included in its instrumentation that tells the tale of a forbidden relationship and Hajati's "intense longing for the sexual desire of her love interest to be fulfilled." Originally released as a single on 5 March 2022, it represented Albania at the Eurovision Song Contest 2022 in Turin, Italy, after winning the 60th edition of Festivali i Këngës in December 2021.

== Background and composition ==
"Sekret" was written by Hajati herself and produced by Albanian producer Marko Polo. Combining traditional and modern elements, "Sekret" is an Albanian-language upbeat "ethno" pop song whose instrumentation includes folk instrumentation. The song tells the tale of a forbidden relationship and Hajati's "intense longing for the sexual desire of her love interest to be fulfilled." In an interview in January 2022, Hajati revealed that the song would undergo a revamp with Dutch producer Diztortion in London.

"Sekret" was independently released as a single on digital platforms and to streaming services on 2 December 2021. For the purpose of Hajati's Eurovision participation, the song was revamped and made available on the aforementioned formats on 5 March 2022.

== Music video and promotion ==
An accompanying music video for "Sekret" premiered on the official YouTube channel of the Eurovision Song Contest on 4 March 2022. Filmed in Gjirokastër and along the Vjosë River at Byllis and Tepelenë, the video is a tribute to the Albanian mythological snake of Bistricë. Regarding the video's theme, it was aimed to increase public awareness and conservation efforts for the threatened Vjosë River, which is often dubbed as Europe's last living wild river.

To further promote the song, Hajati went on to perform "Sekret" at the Eurovision pre-parties in Amsterdam, Barcelona, Madrid and Tel Aviv between March and April 2022. She also performed the song live during Romania's national final for the Eurovision Song Contest, Selecția Națională 2022, on 5 March.

== Reception ==
Spanish singer Chanel incorporated "Sekret" on her exclusive Spotify playlist Eurovisión: Las favs de Chanel. The song further received a nomination for the Best Non-Qualifier at the 2022 Eurovision Awards. In the year 2022, Top Albania Radio included the song in its year-end compilation of the top songs, positioning it at number 65.

== At Eurovision Song Contest ==
=== Before Turin ===
The Albanian national broadcaster, Radio Televizioni Shqiptar (RTSH), organised the 60th edition of Festivali i Këngës to choose the nation's representative for the Eurovision Song Contest 2022 in Turin, Italy. It consisted of two semi-finals on 27 and 28 December, respectively, and the grand final on 29 December 2021. Prior to her participation at Festivali i Këngës, Hajati stated that it has always been her dream to participate at the Eurovision Song Contest. While music critics were favorable towards both Hajati's vocal delivery and the song's ethnic nature, the singer has been regarded by media as a strong contender to win the contest. A postcard video introduced Hajati's performances, portraying the close relationship she had with her father, Marash Hajati, who had led the national broadcaster, RTSH, for several years. During her warrior-inspired performances, Hajati wore a black and gold costume, which featured bold epaulettes and a tight corset, to convey her strength. Onstage, the singer was accompanied by numerous dancers and a variety of dark imagery was displayed on the LED backdrop. In the grand final of the contest, Hajati was announced as the winner of the contest and the Albanian representative for the Eurovision Song Contest 2022.

=== In Turin ===
The Eurovision Song Contest 2022 took place at the PalaOlimpico in Turin, Italy, and consisted of two semi-finals held on the respective dates of 10 and 12 May and the grand final on 14 May 2022. According to the Eurovision rules, all participating countries, except the host nation and the "Big Five", consisting of France, Germany, Italy, Spain and the United Kingdom, are required to qualify from one of two semi-finals to compete for the final, although the top 10 countries from their respective semi-finals progress to the grand final. In March 2022, it was announced that "Sekret" would be performed first in the first semi-final of the contest.

== Credits and personnel ==
Credits adapted from Tidal and YouTube.

=== Original ===
- Ronela Hajati – composing, songwriting, vocals
- Marko Polo – arranging, producing

=== Revamp ===
- Ronela Hajati – composing, songwriting, vocals
- Diztortion – producing

== Track listing ==
- Digital download
1. "Sekret" (Festivali i Këngës) – 3:33
- Digital download
1. "Sekret" (Eurovision version) – 3:01

== Charts ==
Chart performance for "Sekret"
| Chart (2022) | Peak position |
|---|---|
| Albania (The Top List) | 3 |
| Greece International (IFPI) | 67 |

== Release history ==
Release dates and formats for "Sekret"
| Region | Date | Format(s) | Version | Label | Ref. |
|---|---|---|---|---|---|
| Various | 2 December 2021 | Digital download; streaming | Festivali i Këngës | Independent | |
| Various | 5 March 2022 | Digital download; streaming | Eurovision Song Contest | Independent | |
| Cyprus | 25 April 2022 | Digital download; streaming | Eurovision Song Contest | Panik | |
| Greece | 25 April 2022 | Digital download; streaming | Eurovision Song Contest | Panik | |
