= Alban Ramosaj =

Albanian singer (born 1996)

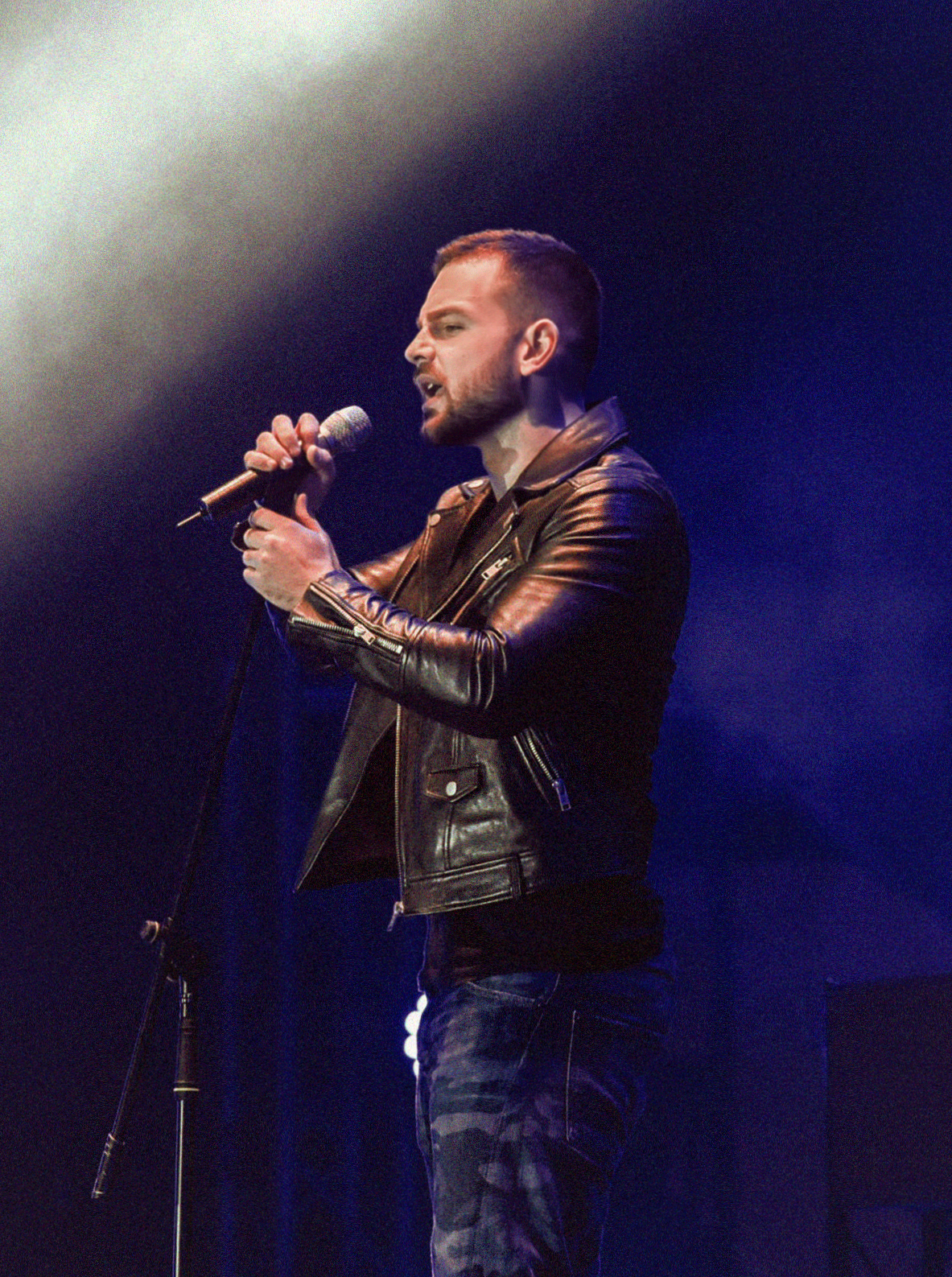
- Ramosaj in 2017
- Born: 7 March 1996 (age 30); Ede, Netherlands
- Citizenship: Albanian
- Occupations: Singer, songwriter, model
- Years active: 2014 – present
- Mother: Antigona Ramosaj
- Relatives: Anxhelina Hadërgjonaj (cousin)
- Musical career
- Genre: Pop
- Instruments: Vocals; guitar

Alban Ramosaj (Albanian: [alˈban ɾaˈmɔsaj]; born 7 March 1996) is an Albanian singer, songwriter and model. Born in Ede and raised in Tirana, he emerged as the winner of the 22nd edition of Kënga Magjike in 2021.

== Life and career ==
=== 1996–2020: Early life and career beginnings ===
Alban Ramosaj was born on 7 March 1996 into an Albanian family in the city of Ede, Netherlands. His family hails from Podujeva, Kosovo, although the singer grew up in Tirana, Albania. Ramosaj auditioned for the first series of X Factor Albania in 2012, singing "Kryptonite" for judges Besa Kokëdhima, Juliana Pasha, Pandi Laço and Alban Skënderaj. Continuing in 2013, the singer successfully participated in the third season of The Voice of Albania before his elimination in the quarter-finals. He later went on to appear on the third series of the Televizioni Klan (TV Klan) dance show "Dance With Me Albania". He released his extended play Po nese to critical acclaim in 2016. It generated his first charting on the top spot for four weeks straight through his single "A më do" In late 2016, Ramosaj participated in Kënga Magjike. In November 2017, he was the opening act for Scottish singer Emeli Sandé's concert in Tirana.

=== 2021–present: Kënga Magjike and continued success ===
Ramosaj participated in the 22nd edition of Kënga Magjike in May 2021 and emerged as the winner of the contest with the song "Thikat e mia". Merging pop and R&B elements, his follow-up single, Shpirto, was released in July 2021 and reached number 4 in the Albanian Top 100. In November 2021, the Albanian broadcaster, Radio Televizioni Shqiptar (RTSH), reported that the singer was among the 20 contestants chosen to compete in the 60th edition of Festivali i Këngës, the national selection for the Eurovision Song Contest 2022, in which he finished second.

== Artistry ==
Ramosaj is regarded as a pop artist experimenting with different music genres, including R&B.

== Discography ==
=== Extended plays ===
- Po nese... (2016)
- Hiraeth (2018)

==== As lead artist ====
List of singles as lead artist, with selected chart positions
Title	Year	Peak chart positions	Album
Title	Year	ALB	Album
"Ç'kemi"	2014	—N/a	Non-album singles
"A më do"	2016	1	Non-album singles
"Aurora"	2016	—	Non-album singles
"Bitchi mesnatës"	2017	—	Non-album singles
"Ike"	2018	2	Non-album singles
"A thu pse"	2018	1	Non-album singles
"Ëndrrat e mia"	2018	1	Non-album singles
"T'kom dasht"	2019	—	Non-album singles
"I nat ma fal (أعطيني ليلة)"	2020	1	Non-album singles
"Thikat e mia"	2021	1	Non-album singles
"Shpirto"	2021	4	Non-album singles
"Theje"	2021	1	Non-album singles
"Love Letter (N'Tiranë Prej Berlini)"	2022	2	Non-album singles
"Sahara"	2022	—	Non-album singles
"A je me najkon"	2022	—	Non-album singles
"—" denotes a recording that did not chart or was not released in that territory.

Awards and achievements
Preceded by Eneda Tarifa with "Ma zgjat dorën"	Kënga Magjike; 2021	Succeeded by Marsela Çibukaj with "I Paftuar"
