= Samanta Karavella =

Albanian singer and songwriter (born 1990)

- Born: 9 July 1990 (age 34); Tirana, Albania
- Occupation(s): Singer, songwriter
- Years active: 2004–present
- Musical career
- Genres: Pop
- Instruments: Vocals
- Labels: Onima

Samanta Karavella (Albanian: [saˈmanta kaɾaˈvɛɫa]; born 9 July 1990) is an Albanian singer and songwriter.

== Life and career ==
=== 1990–2012: Early life and career beginnings ===
Samanta Karavella was born on 9 July 1990 into an Albanian family in the city of Tirana, then part of the People's Republic of Albania. Showing an interest in music from a very young age, Karavella began dedicating herself to music when she was 13 as she auditioned for the Albanian talent show Ethet e së premtes mbrëma. At age 16, she had a cameo role in the film Gjoleka. She pursued her early career by competing in various music events on several occasions, including at Festivali i Këngës and Kënga Magjike. In December 2011, Karavella attempted to represent Albania in the Eurovision Song Contest 2012, following her participation in the 50th edition of Festivali i Këngës with the song "Zgjomë një tjetër ëndërr", in which she finished in fourth place.

=== 2013–present: Mama and continued success ===
In 2013, Karavella emerged as the winner of the 10th edition of Top Fest with the song "Loti i fundit". Starting with the release of "Ti s'e din se" in July 2014, it received a nomination at the 2015 Netët e Klipit Shqiptar gala in Ulcinj, Montenegro. In December 2017, she successfully returned to Kënga Magjike for its 19th edition with the song "Humbur". Finishing in fourth place, Karavella also received the Best Ballad Award at the contest. In January 2019, she released "Vonë", a collaboration with Kosovo-Albanian musician Elinel, which incorporated R&B and hip hop elements into its sound. In the course of 2020, "Pse" and "NKN" featuring Kosovo-Albanian singer, peaked at numbers 19 and 34 in her native country, respectively. Released in May 2021, Karavella's follow-up single "Emnin tem" reached number seven in Albania. Starting with the release of "Mala" in July, the single's official remix, "Mala (naBBoo RMX)", received airplay in the Commonwealth of Independent States (CIS) and was licensed by the Russian subsidiary of Warner Music in December 2021.

Karavella's debut studio album, Mama, is currently under development. Released as its lead single, "Mama" reached its peak at number 19 on the native top 100 chart in November 2021, and was followed by the album's second single, "Jeta ime", a month later.

In 2023, she was selected to compete in the Festivali i Këngës 62 with the song "N'Majë". However, she later withdrew from the competition.

== Artistry ==
Karavella's music style is often regarded as electric with various other styles of musical influences such as ethnic pop and R&B.

== Discography ==
=== Albums ===
- Mama

=== Singles ===
==== As lead artist ====
List of singles as lead artist, with selected chart positions
Title	Year	Peak chart positions	Album
Title	Year	ALB	Album
"Buzëqeshje"	2004	—	Non-album singles
"Ylli im polar"	2006	—	Non-album singles
"Të dua"	2007	—	Non-album singles
"Iluzion"	2007	—	Non-album singles
"Pse u harrua dashuria"	2007	—	Non-album singles
"S'të mbaj dot peng"	2008	—	Non-album singles
"Po më prite" (with Vedat Ademi)	2008	—	Non-album singles
"Shumë Happy" (featuring Roy)	2009	—	Non-album singles
"Pa përse"	2009	—	Non-album singles
"Femër fatale"	2010	—	Non-album singles
"Le të jetë"	2010	—	Non-album singles
"Start" (with Big Basta and Lyrical Son)	2011	—	Non-album singles
"Provoje edhe një here"	2011	—	Non-album singles
"Larg"	2012	—	Non-album singles
"Loti i fundit"	2013	—	Non-album singles
"All I Need" (featuring Erion)	2013	—	Non-album singles
"Pafundësi" (featuring Ddy Nunes)	2013	—	Non-album singles
"Më jeto" (with Kledi Bahiti)	2014	—	Non-album singles
"Ti s'e din se" (featuring Onat)	2014	—	Non-album singles
"Ss" (featuring Skivi)	2015	—	Non-album singles
"Asnjo si un"	2015	7	Non-album singles
"Na e dina" (featuring Gent Fatali)	2016	3	Non-album singles
"Si ai"	2016	5	Non-album singles
"Bashk'" (featuring 2Ton)	2017	2	Non-album singles
"Zemrën maje"	2017	1	Non-album singles
"Humbur"	2017	—	Non-album singles
"Kush jam"	2018	10	Non-album singles
"E jotja"	2018	55	Non-album singles
"Vonë" (featuring Elinel)	2019	42	Non-album singles
"Ku ma le"	2019	28	Non-album singles
"Golosa"	2019	—	Non-album singles
"Pse"	2020	19	Non-album singles
"NKN" (with Skerdi)	2020	34	Non-album singles
"Emnin tem"	2021	7	Non-album singles
"Mala"	2021	24	Non-album singles
"Cha Cha Cha"	2021	24	Non-album singles
"Mala (naBBoo RMX)"	2021	29	Non-album singles
"Mama"	2021	19	Mama
"Jeta ime"	2021	68	Mama
"Vaj"	2022	10	Mama
"—" denotes a recording that did not chart or was not released in that territory.

Awards and achievements
Preceded by Elhaida Dani with "S'je më"	Top Fest; 2013	Succeeded by Soni Malaj with "Me të jeton"
