= Elgit Doda =

Albanian singer (born 1986)

- Born: 16 December 1988 (age 37); Burrel, Albania
- Occupations: Singer; songwriter; producer
- Spouse: Klea Huta (m. 2020; div. 2025)
- Musical career
- Label: OTR

Elgit Doda (born 16 December 1988) is an Albanian singer and music producer. He is one of the most successful producers in the Albanian music industry. Songs like Si mua, Larg or Ku je also gained international recognition.

== Life and career ==
Elgit Doda was born in Burrel, Albania. He participated in Kënga Magjike in 2014. In July 2024, he published the song Sekret together with Ardian Bujupi. During his career he also had several collaborations with artists like Noizy, Elai, Xhensila Myrtezaj or Dafina Zeqiri.

== Discography ==
Year	Songname
2013	Mala gata
2013	Mjaft
2013	Liar
2014	Ti doje...
2014	Dikush te do
2015	Ne zemer
2015	Blackout
2016	Pa mu
2017	Ajo iko
2017	Asaj
2017	Ndjenje
2018	Nuk ke faj
2018	A ma fal
2019	Dhurate prej saj
2019	Nuk jam si ti
2020	Tirana Milano
2020	Parajsa ime
2020	Ka miq si ti
2021	Tharë
2021	Ti ti
2021	Parajsa ime 2 (Per sempre)
2021	TL (Toxic Love)
2021	Ku je?
2022	FL (Fatal Love)
