= Inis Neziri =

Albanian singer-songwriter

- Born: 12 January 2001 (age 25); Tirana, Albania
- Occupations: Singer; songwriter
- Instruments: Vocals
- Years active: 2013–present

Inis Neziri (Albanian pronunciation: [inis nɛziɾi]; born 12 January 2001) is an Albanian singer-songwriter. She has emerged victorious at numerous music competitions including the Golden Stag Festival and New Wave.

== Career ==
Her music career started in 2013, when she won the fifth edition of the Albanian children's talent show Gjeniu i vogël. In December 2017, she placed third in the 56th edition of Festivali i Këngës with the song "Piedestal"; the following year, at the age of 17, she was awarded the Best Duet award at Kënga Magjike, making her one of the youngest artists to be awarded at both major Albanian music competitions. In September 2018, she won the Golden Stag Festival in Brașov, Romania, while in August 2019, she won the New Wave contest in Sochi, Russia; during both competitions, she performed multiple songs, including "Piedestal".

In December 2020, she took part in the 59th edition of Festivali i Këngës with the song "Pendesë", failing to make the top three. In December 2025, she placed second in the 64th edition of Festivali i Këngës with the song "Ta kam fal", which differed from her past contributions to the contest for being upbeat. In February 2026, she was announced as an automatic finalist of the San Marino Song Contest 2026, the Sammarinese national final for the Eurovision Song Contest 2026, with the song "In My Head".

== Discography ==
=== Singles ===
Title	Year	Peak chart positions	Album
Title	Year	ALB	Album
"Piedestal"	2017	—	Non-album single
"Fli në krahët e mi" (featuring Flori Nazifi)	2018	—	Non-album single
"E theve"	2019	2	Non-album single
"Ishe ti"	2019	—	Non-album single
"Pendesë"	2020	—	Non-album single
"—" denotes a recording that did not chart or was not released in that territory.
