= Karma (Anxhela Peristeri song) =

2021 single by Anxhela Peristeri

Single by Anxhela Peristeri
- Released: 9 March 2021
- Genre: Pop
- Length: 2:59
- Label: RTSH; Universal
- Composer: Kledi Bahiti
- Lyricist: Olti Curri
- Producers: Dimitris Kontopoulos; Kledi Bahiti

Anxhela Peristeri singles chronology
"Lujta" (2020)	"Karma" (2021)	"Nuk më doje" (2021)

Music video
- "Karma" on YouTube

Eurovision Song Contest 2021 entry
- Country: Albania
- Artist: Anxhela Peristeri
- Language: Albanian
- Composer: Kledi Bahiti
- Lyricist: Olti Curri

Finals performance
- Semi-final result: 10th
- Semi-final points: 112
- Final result: 21st
- Final points: 57

Entry chronology
- ◄ "Fall from the Sky" (2020)
- "Sekret" (2022) ►

"Karma" is a song by Albanian singer and songwriter Anxhela Peristeri. It was composed by Kledi Bahiti and written by Olti Curri, with the production handled by Bahiti and Dimitris Kontopoulos. The song was released as a single for digital download and streaming in various countries on 9 March 2021 by Radio Televizioni Shqiptar (RTSH) and Universal. Incorporating modern and traditional elements, it is a Balkan-influenced pop ballad backed by string instruments. The song's Albanian-language lyrics makes reference to the principle of karma, portraying the inner turmoil of a woman who finds guilt for her world falling apart within herself.

"Karma" represented Albania in the Eurovision Song Contest 2021 in Rotterdam, the Netherlands, after winning the national selection format Festivali i Këngës in December 2020. During the contest in May 2021, Albania finished 10th in the second semi-final, receiving 112 points, and qualified for the final, finishing 21st with 57 points. Peristeri's red, black, and turquoise-toned performance featured clouds of smoke and a display of flashing alternating lights, with the LED screens creating a stormy atmosphere.

Music critics gave widely positive reviews of "Karma" upon its release, praising the nature, Peristeri's vocal delivery and stage presence. An accompanying music video was uploaded to the Eurovision Song Contest's YouTube channel on 1 March 2021. Filmed in Kosovo, it portrays Peristeri impersonating two different guises, representing the conceptions of glorifying and regretting the past. For further promotion, the singer performed the song on multiple radio and television stations in Albania and Kosovo, as well as in Greece and San Marino.

== Background and composition ==
Upon her winning the 59th edition of Festivali i Këngës in late December 2020, Radio Televizioni Shqiptar (RTSH) announced Peristeri with the song "Karma", which was composed by Albanian artist Kledi Bahiti and written by songwriter Olti Curri, as the Albanian representative for the Eurovision Song Contest 2021. Bahiti and Curri had previously been involved in the creation of several singles by Peristeri, including "E çmëndur", the winning entry of the 19th edition of Kënga Magjike in 2017. For the purpose of her scheduled Eurovision Song Contest participation, "Karma" was revamped and further produced by Bahiti and Greek composer Dimitris Kontopoulos. RTSH and Universal released "Karma" for digital download and streaming in various territories on 9 March 2021. The song has been described as a dramatic Balkan-influenced mid-tempo pop ballad, blending modern and traditional Albanian elements. For the revamp, its instrumentation was modified with the electric guitar being replaced by string instruments. In reference to the principle of karma, the song's Albanian-language lyrics relay on the inner turmoil of a woman who finds guilt for her world falling apart within herself. Lyrics include: "Zoti nuk ma fal, bota mbi mua ra, më ike ti, më ikën miqtë, as dritë nuk ka." (God doesn't forgive me, the world fell on me, you ran away from me, my friends ran away, there is no light.)

== Reception ==
"Karma" was met with widespread acclaim from music critics. The staff of Aussievision characterised the song as a "timeless-sounding" ballad, with several individuals commending Peristeri's "power" vocals as well as the song's "eclectic" instrumentation and "traditional" orchestration. Multiple critics from Wiwibloggs also positively reviewed the song, applauding the singer's vocal delivery, stage presence and the lyrics. While expressing praise towards the song's production and instrumentation, Wiwibloggs' William Lee Adams elaborated: "[Karma's revamp] has preserved the meaning and feeling of the original, but enhanced it through production that makes it feel more contemporary, more Albanian, and more in-your-face." On a similar note, Anita from Eurovision Union highlighted the revamp of the song and concluded that it is more powerful, more outstanding and a "stronger contender" for a Eurovision Song Contest qualification. The song further received a nomination for the Best Vocals at the 2021 Eurovision Awards. Commercially, "Karma" failed to enter the ranking on the Flemish Ultratop 50 chart, but was registered on the Ultratip Bubbling Under.

== Promotion and music video ==
Ahead of the Eurovision Song Contest, "Karma" was promoted in Albania and Kosovo with several television appearances by Peristeri on ABC News, Klan Kosova, Ora News and Televizioni Klan (TV Klan) as well as for radio interviews on Radio Televizioni 21 (RTV21) and Top Channel. Her promotional phase on other European television and radio stations continued on the Greek Hellenic Broadcasting Corporation (ERT) and Open TV as well as on Sammarinese RTV. She also performed the song during the virtual events at the British Wiwi Jam, Spanish PrePartyES and Croatian Adriatic Pre Party between March and May 2021. An accompanying music video was uploaded to the YouTube channel of the Eurovision Song Contest on 1 March 2021 at 20:00 (CET), with a preview of it released a few days prior. Filmed by Imagine Films and Onima in Kosovo, it portrays Peristeri impersonating two different guises, corresponding to the conceptions of glorifying and regretting the past.

== At Eurovision Song Contest ==
=== Before Rotterdam ===
RTSH organised the 59th edition of Festivali i Këngës as the national selection format in December 2020 to designate the Albanian representative for the Eurovision Song Contest 2021 in Rotterdam, the Netherlands. "Karma" was performed for the first time during the contest's first semi-final held on 21 December 2020. Following her qualification for the final, Peristeri emerged as the winner of the contest and was declared as the nation's entrant for the Eurovision Song Contest 2021. In choosing to perform the song in Albanian, the singer explained that she had always thought that if she won, she would perform in Albanian. She further announced on the same occasion that "Karma" would precede a revamp before the contest in Rotterdam.

As of the European Broadcasting Union's (EBU) prevention plan against a COVID-19-cancellation of the Eurovision Song Contest 2020, each participant was required to record a live-on-tape performance of their planned entry in a location of their choice prior to the event. The tape was set to be broadcast during the live shows of the contest in case the artist was unable to travel to the contest venue to perform its song due to pandemic restrictions or related reasons. Most of the unused live-on-tape performances, including Peristeri's, were unveiled after the contest on 28 and 29 May 2021 as part of Eurovision Song Celebration shows.

=== In Rotterdam ===
The 65th edition of the Eurovision Song Contest took place at Rotterdam Ahoy in Rotterdam, the Netherlands, and consisted of two semi-finals on 18 and 20 May and the final on 22 May 2021. As of the Eurovision rules, each participating countries, except the host nation and the "Big Five", which consists of France, Germany, Italy, Spain and the United Kingdom, are required to qualify from one of two semi-finals to compete for the final, although the top 10 countries from each semi-final progress to the grand final. Prior to the contest, Albania was set to perform in the second half of the second semi-final at 11th position, succeeding Georgia and preceding Portugal. In the second-semi-final, the country was one of the 10 nations to be announced as having qualified for the final, ranking 10th with 112 points. Subsequently, Albania was placed to perform at second position, succeeding Cyprus and preceding Israel. In the final, the country finished in 21st place at the end of the voting, receiving a total of 57 points and having received 10 from the televoters of Italy and North Macedonia, and 12 from the juries of Malta.

Peristeri's performance of "Karma" for the Eurovision Song Contest was directed by Swedish artistic director Sacha Jean-Baptiste. The singer wore a short steel-sequined silver dress with tassels made of crystals, designed by Kosovo-Albanian fashion designer Kujta and Meri. Peristeri performed alone on stage as the main focus throughout the show, with the lights shining down on her several occasions. Her performance began with the silhouette of herself against a red and black LED backdrop, with a red beam of light and clouds of smoke rising at the onset of the instrumentation. It continued with Peristeri creating alternating circles of light through hand movements behind her until she pushed it away with her hand. During a large portion of the performance, the LED emphasis was on red, with flashing lights alternating back and forth between red and turquoise. As the song progressed towards the end, the backdrop turned grey and white to create a stormy effect, which was visually amplified by smoke effects on stage around the singer.

The performance was met with generally positive reviews from critics. Euro Voxx writer Jessica Cole lauded Peristeri's stage presence and applauded the staging, calling it "full of fire and power [...] overall epic". Boris Meersman from ESC United concluded that the performance "demanded [the] attention from the start and retained it until the end", and considered Albania as a dark horse in the contest. ESC Bubble's David Clues commended it as a "masterpiece" and went on to highlight the "impressive" light display and camera angles. Padraig from Wiwibloggs felt that Peristeri occasionally "looked a little lonely on stage" but perceived "a feeling of momentum building around the entry".

== Credits and personnel ==
Credits adapted from Tidal.

- Anxhela Peristeri – vocals
- Kledi Bahiti – background vocals, composing, instrumentalist, producing
- Dimitris Kontopoulos – producing
- Aris Binis – mixing
- Aurel Thëllimi – background vocals
- Denis Hima – instrumentalist
- Mateus Frroku – background vocals
- Vis Shkodrani – instrumentalist

Locations

- Gred Music Records – engineering
- Sweetspot Productions – mastering

== Track listing ==
- Digital download and streaming
1. "Karma" – 2:59
2. "Karma (Karaoke Version)" – 2:57

== Release history ==
Release dates and formats for "Karma"
Region	Date	Format(s)	Label(s)	Ref.
Various	9 March 2021	Digital download; streaming	RTSH; Universal	
