= List of radio stations in Albania =

There are 3 private national radio stations, 1 public, and 63 local radio stations in Albania. Public radio signal of RTSH Radio Tirana 1 covers 80.5% of the territory, while those of Top Albania Radio and Club FM, both commercial radio stations with a national license, cover 93.7%, and the western lowland respectively. In 2020, the third private national frequency license was awarded to Radio Klan, part of Televizioni Klan sh.a. There are some ongoing initiatives to measure audience shares in the country, but they are limited in geographical scope and the results are not public. However, radio stations seem to be more of an entertainment medium, with mainly music, interrupted by news flashes or talk show programs.

== National stations ==
- Radio Tirana 1
- Club FM
- Top Albania Radio
- Radio Klan

== Local frequency stations ==
Below is a list of FM radio stations operating in Tirana, Albania with some partly covering the western lowland (as of 2024):

Frequency	Station name
88.0	City Radio
88.5	Radio Ngjallja
89.0	Sol Radio
89.3	Radio Kontakt
89.8	Syri FM
90.7	Love Radio
91.1	Play Radio
91.4	Radio Maria
92.0	Radio Shqip
92.9	Radio Klan
93.2	Radio 1
93.6	Radio Nacional
94.4	Radio Eurostar
94.9	Albania News
95.2	Radio One
95.8	Radio Tirana 2
96.4	Radio Spektrum
96.7	Radio Ora News
97.0	Rash News 24
97.3	My Music Radio
97.7	Radio 7
98.2	Radio DJ
98.5	Kiss FM
98.7	Super Star FM
99.5	Radio Tirana 1
100.0	Top Albania Radio
100.4	Club FM
100.8	Top Gold Radio
101.2	Radio Tirana Klasik
101.6	Tibo Radio
102.0	Radio France Internationale
102.6	Alfa & Omega Radio
103.1	MCN Radio
103.9	BBC World Service
104.6	Radio Travel
105.0	ABC News Radio
105.7	Euronews Albania Radio
106.0	Radio Ejani
106.6	Radio NRG
107.1	Radio Living
107.7	X-Radio
108.0	Radio Alpet
Online	ChillRadio

=== Local frequency stations ===
Below is a list of FM radio stations operating in the tourist-friendly region of southern Albania.

Frequency	Station name
94.1	Alpo Radio
96.1	Radio Saranda

== See also ==
- Music of Albania
- Mass media in Albania

== Bibliography ==
- Muka, Arben. 70 radio shqip ne 70 vite (1938-2008), Tirana, ABC Media Center: 2008.
