= Agriculture in Albania =

Economic activity

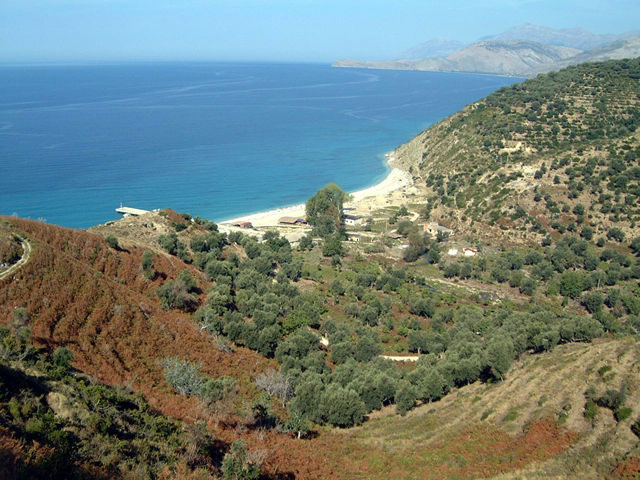
The Albanian Riviera and its olive and citrus plantations.

Agriculture in Albania is still a significant sector of the economy of Albania, which contributes to 22.5% of the country's GDP. The agriculture sector employs 40-45% of the workforce. The country spans 28,748 square kilometres (11,100 square miles) of which 24% is agricultural land, 36% forest land, 15% pasture and meadow and 25% urban areas including lakes, waterways, unused rocky and mountain land. It can be separated into three main zones such as the lowland zone alongside the coastline of the country, the hill zone in the lowland and the mountain zone.

The country encompasses coastal plains in the west to the Albanian Alps in the north, the Sharr Mountains in the northeast, Skanderbeg Mountains in the center, Korab Mountains in the east, Pindus Mountains in the southeast and Ceraunian Mountains in the southwest along the Albanian Riviera. The Mediterranean Sea, which includes the Adriatic and Ionian, makes up the entire west border of Albania.

The country experiences a mostly mediterranean climate with continental influences. That means that the climate is characterised by mild winters and hot, dry summers. The warmest areas of the country are along the west, where climate is profoundly impacted by the sea. The coldest parts of the country are in the north and east, where snowy forested climate is prevalent.

In 1990, domestic farm products accounted for 63% of household expenditures and 25% of exports. As part of the pre-accession process of Albania to the European Union, farmers are being aided through IPA funds to improve the Albanian agriculture standards.

According to the Ministry of Agriculture the exports of vegetables and fruits have doubled over the first months of 2017. However, the exports of fish, seafood and marine products have also increased by 35 percent.

One of the earliest farming sites in Europe has been found in Southeastern Albania.

== Aquaculture ==
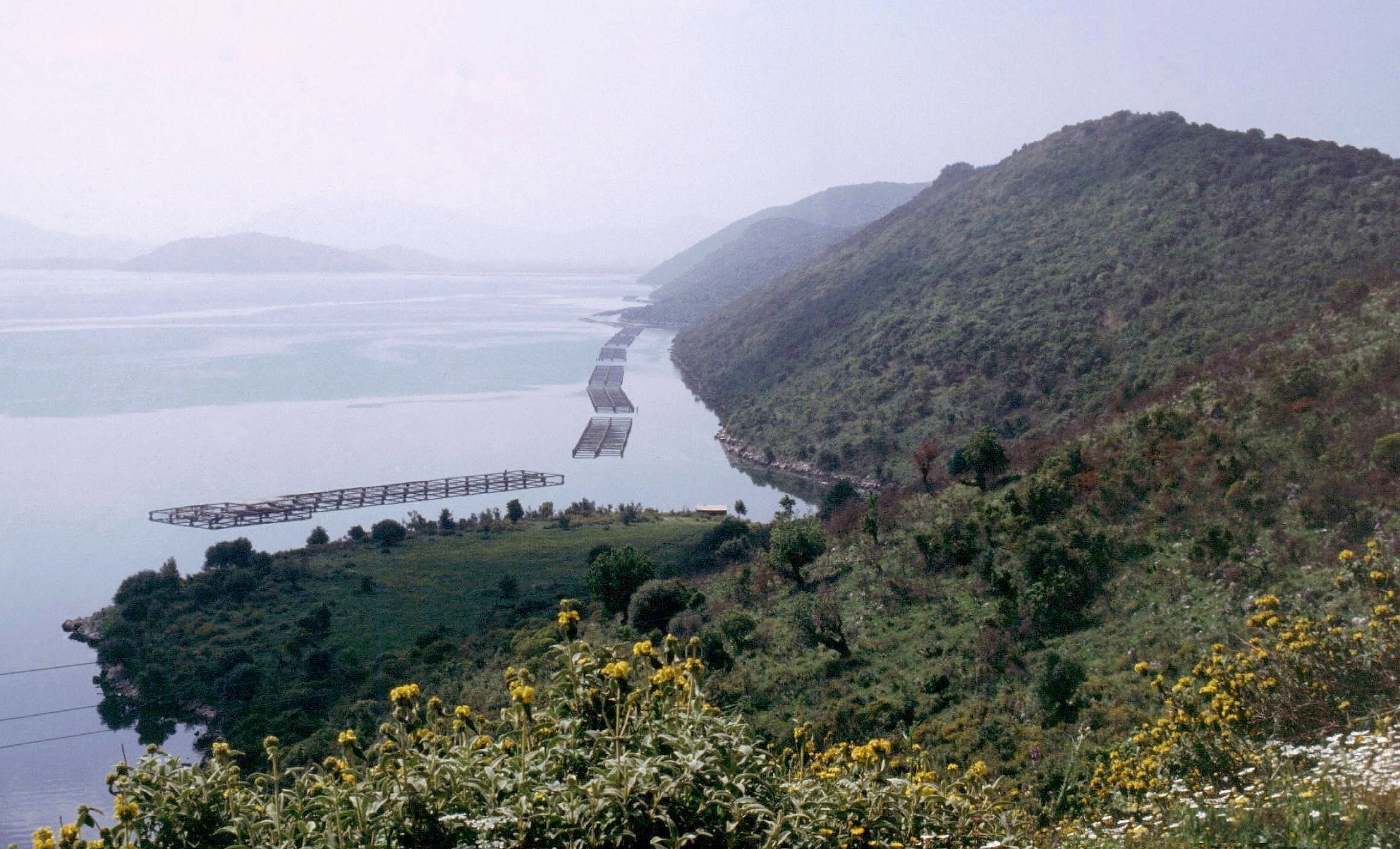
A mussel cultivation facility in Lake Butrint.

Both the Adriatic and Ionian Sea inside the Mediterranean Sea are a source of salt water fishing, while fresh water fishing occurs on Lake Butrint, Lake Shkodër, Lake Ohrid, Lake Prespa as well as in Karavasta Lagoon, Narta Lagoon and Patos Lagoon. The country's coast is estimated to be 381 kilometres (237 mi) long. The country's great availability of water gives the underdeveloped fishing industry great potential to become a major part of the local economy. Although the fishing industry is still in a transition process despite significant development and processing capacities inherited from the past.

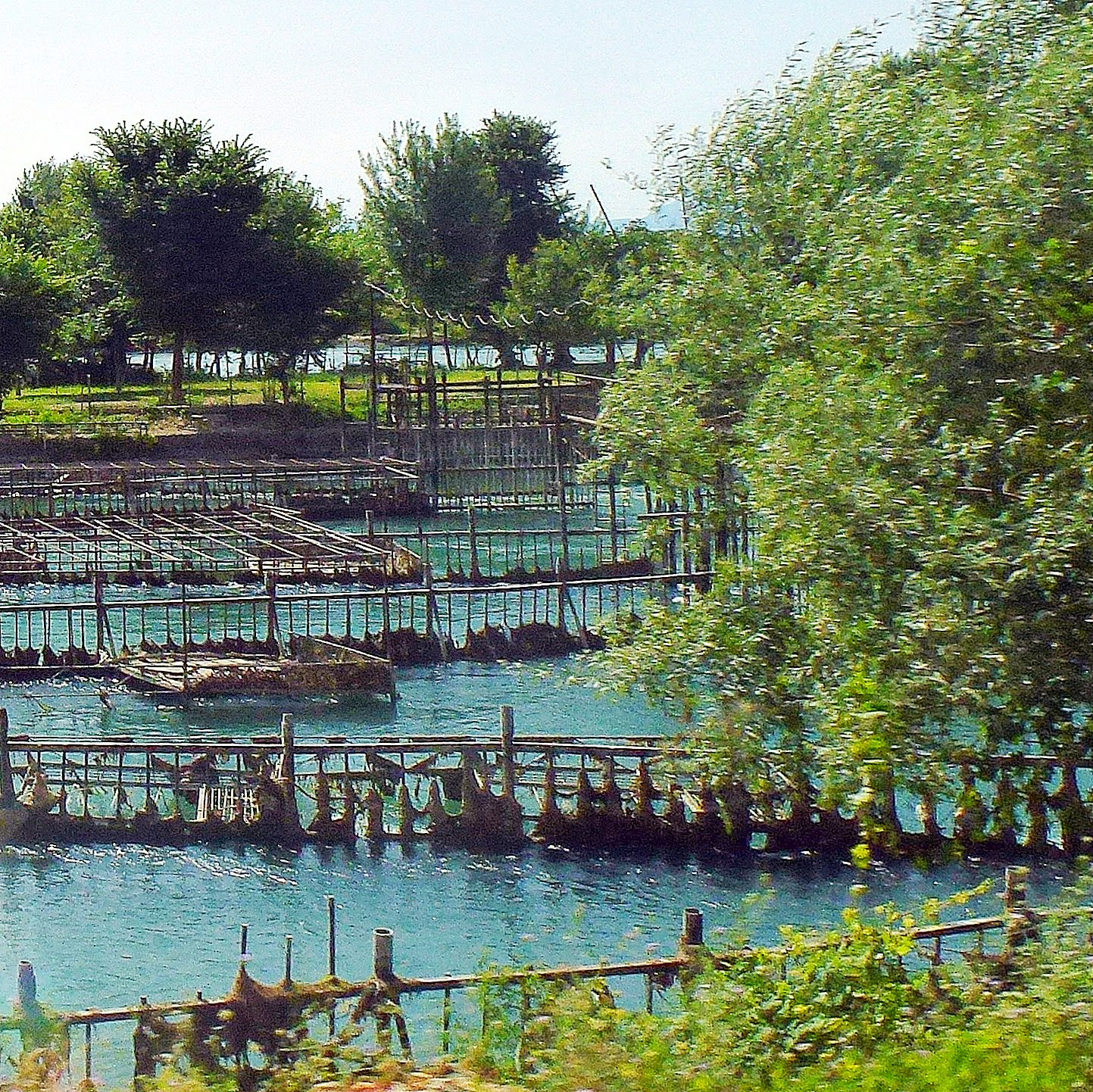
Fish farming in Zus, Shkodër County.

Extensive marine fish cultivation has been practiced in the country in the 1950s. The marine finfish industry is an inshore and offshore sea cage-farming sector. Trouts are developed mainly in the southeast, southwest and north, while carps are primary found in the center and north. Marine finfish culture is dominated by species including rainbow trout, european bass, gilt-head bream, common carp, silver carp, bighead carp, grass carp and ohrid trout.

Mussels are widespread throughout the south of the country and particularly cultivated in Lake Butrint along the proximity to the Ionian Sea. In 1980, almost 80 mussel cultivation facilities were constructed with an average production of about 2,000 tonnes per year, while in 1989 it increased to 5,000 tonnes per year. Although in Shëngjin operates as well a smaller facility of about 100 hectares. Following the end of communism and outbreak of cholera in 1990, the production declined sharply and opened again in 2000.

The cultivation of shrimps began around the end of communism in Albania. The country's only extensive shrimp cultivation facility is located in Narta Lagoon, whence the Vjosa River drains into the Adriatic Sea. Within the Karaburun-Sazan Marine Park, there has been 50 species of crustaceans recorded which indicates that the region is a potential location for cultivation.

== Viticulture ==
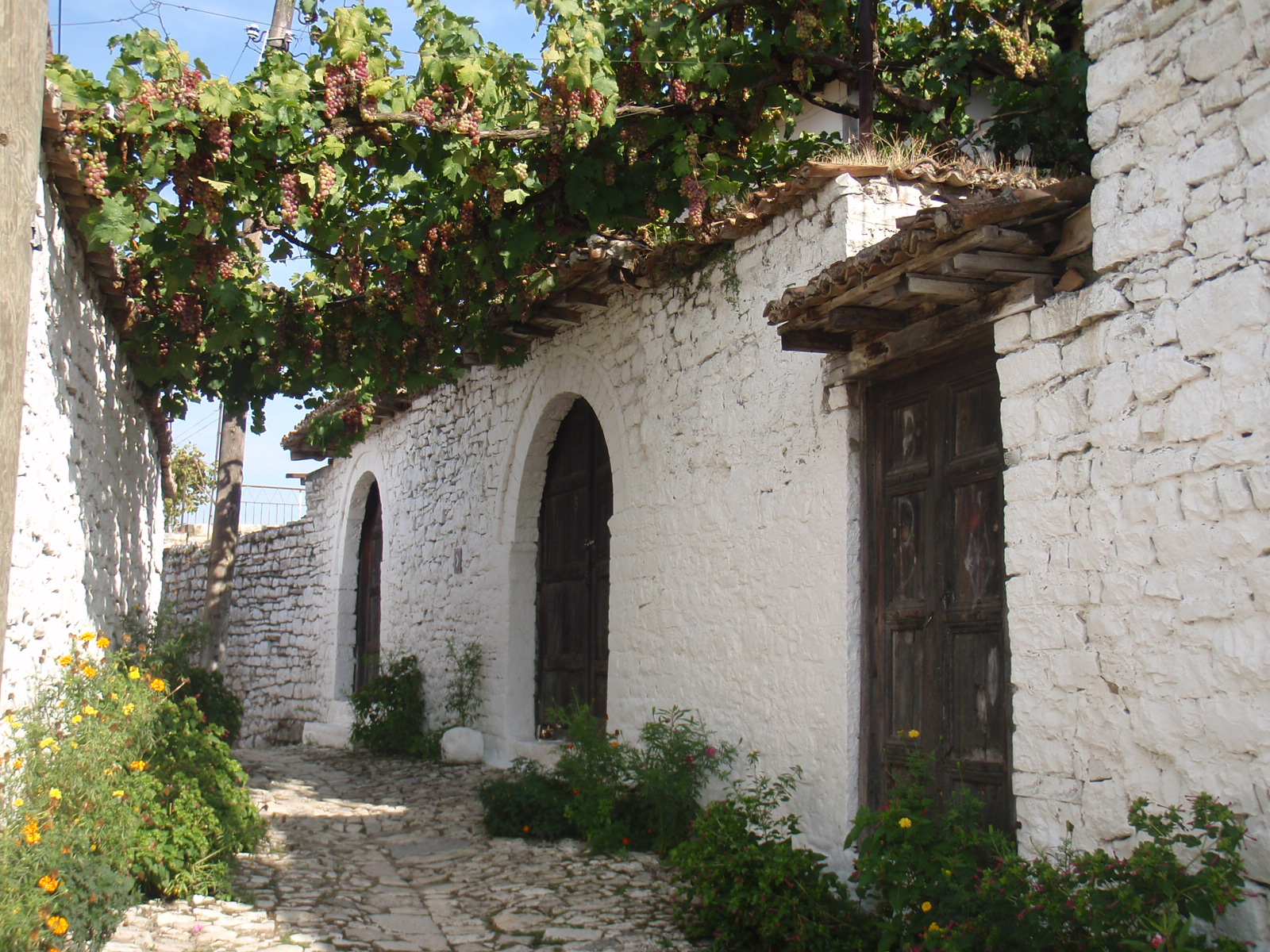
Grapes in Berat.

Albania is the 42nd largest producer of wine in the world. The country has one of Europe`s longest history of viticulture and belongs chronologically to the old world of wine producing countries. The most important wine regions of the country are located in the center but also the mountainous areas in the north, east and south. Following the end of communism in the 20th century, the development and fortunes of the Albanian wine industry were deeply influenced by the economic influences of the country.

In 1912, gained widespread popularity among the local population but was almost destroyed in 1933 by phylloxera. A significant upturn began only after the Second World War, at the end of which wine was still cultivated on only 2,737 hectares (27.37 km^{2}). The most producing region of wine was Durrës County, where grapes was grown on communist state enterprises. In that time the nationwide acreage corresponded approximately to that of tobacco, but was significantly lower than that of olive and fruit trees. The exported wine was consumed primarily in Western Europe such as in Germany.

Moreover, the exports of wine decreased continuously from 61,000 hectoliters in 1971 to 22,000 hectoliters in 1985. The reasons are to be found mainly in outdated production conditions and insufficient technical material that made it difficult to transport and lowered the quality. On the other hand, the export of easily transportable graisins was continuously in increase (up to 3500 tons per year), while the export of fresh grapes was marginal.

== Production ==
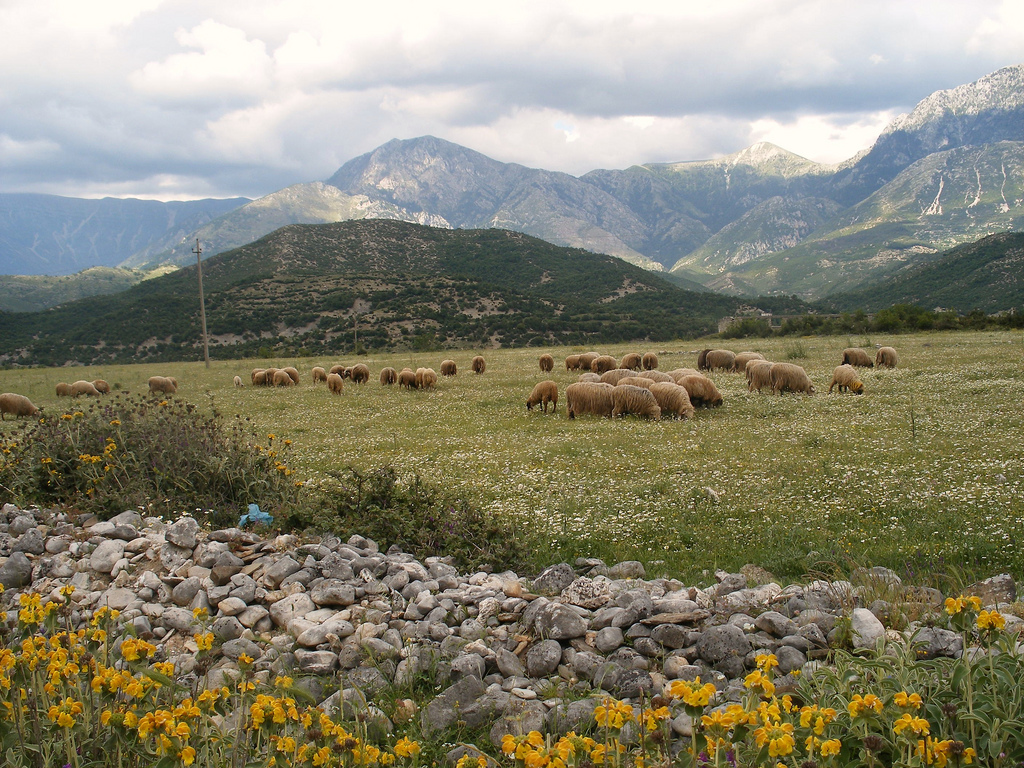
Albanian sheep pasture

The main agricultural products in the country are tobacco, figs, olives, wheat, maize, potatoes, vegetables, fruits, sugar beets, grapes, meat, honey, dairy products, and medicinal and aromatic plants.

Exports of medicinal and aromatic plants in 2020 totaled 14,000 tonnes worth US$59 million. Cultivation of nettles, cowslip, lavender, sage and other herbal plants employ some 100,000 Albanians.

Agriculture accounts for 18.9% of the GDP and a large portion of the exports. However, it is limited primarily to small family operations and subsistence farming because of lack of modern equipment, unclear property rights, and the prevalence of small, inefficient plots of land. The post-1990 land fragmentation, uncertain land ownership, lack of state registries and bank crediting, and high VAT are all obstacles to a modern agricultural industry. There is also a concern that agricultural products originating from Albania are being stamped as 'Product of Turkey' for the international market.

Many of the historic forests of Albania were destroyed with inefficient wood industry and expanse of agricultural land in the 1990s. Today, forests cover about one third of Albania's land area and, due to an agreement with Italy and the World Bank, there is a large amount of reforestation underway.

Albania is the 11th largest producer of olive oil.

Albania produced in 2018:

- 391 thousand tons of maize;
- 288 thousand tons of tomato;
- 254 thousand tons of potato;
- 240 thousand tons of wheat;
- 239 thousand tons of watermelon;
- 184 thousand tons of grape;
- 120 thousand tons of cucumber;
- 117 thousand tons of olive;
- 108 thousand tons of apple;
- 100 thousand tons of onion;
- 81 thousand tons of bell pepper;

In addition to smaller productions of other agricultural products, like melon (41 thousand tons), plum (41 thousand tons), oat (34 thousand tons), sugar beet (27 thousand tons), fig (24 thousand tons), peach (19 thousand tons) and pear (13 thousand tons).

== Horticulture ==
Albania produces a wide variety of fruits, nuts and vegetables, while its production is constantly growing.

== International rankings ==
Crop (total production)	Rank	Countries reviewed
Plums and Sloes (Total production) 2014	31	85
Grapes (Total production) 2014	36	90
Watermelones (Total production) 2014	40	130
Fruits (Total production; without melones) 2014	98	205
Figs (Total production) 2014	11	52
Cucumbers (Total production) 2014	39	133

== See also ==
- Economy of Albania
- Geography of Albania
- Cuisine of Albania
- Agricultural University of Tirana
- RTSH Agro, public broadcaster channel dedicated to Albania's agriculture scene
