= Club FM =

Club FM may refer to:

- Club FM, Tirana, a radio station in Tirana, Albania
- Club FM 94.3, a radio station in Kerala, India
- ClubFM, a Belgian radio station, successor to the Flemish version of Radio Contact
