= Economy of Albania =

- Tirana, the economic hub of Albania
- Currency: Lek (ALL, L)
- Fiscal year: Calendar year
- Trade organisations: WTO, BSEC, CEFTA, Open Balkan
- Country group: Developing/Emerging; Upper-middle income economy; EU candidate

Statistics
- Population: ▼2,335,930 (2026)
- GDP: ▲$43.24 billion (nominal; 2026); ▲$84.30 billion (PPP; 2026)
- GDP rank: 105th (nominal; 2026); 115th (PPP; 2026)
- GDP growth: 4.0% (2024); 3.8% (2025)
- GDP per capita: ▲$15,443 (nominal; 2026); ▲$30,107 (PPP; 2026)
- GDP per capita rank: 78th (nominal; 2026); 80th (PPP; 2026)
- GDP per capita growth: 5.0% (2025)
- GDP by sector: agriculture: 18.62%; industry: 21.39%; services: 47.35%; (2022)
- Inflation (CPI): 1.9% (February 2025)
- Population below national poverty line: 19.7% in poverty (2022); 19.9% on less than US$8.30/day (2021 PPP, 2020); 42.1% at risk of poverty or social exclusion (AROPE, 2023)
- Gini coefficient: 29.4 low (2020)
- Human Development Index: 0.810 very high (2023, 71st); 0.705 high (2023, IHDI 62nd)
- Corruption Perceptions Index: 42 out of 100 points (2024) (80th)
- Labour force: 1.376.643 (2023); 75.5% employment rate (Q4 2024)
- Labour force by occupation: agriculture: 21.4%; industry: 28.3%; services: 50.3%; (2024)
- Unemployment: 8.8% (Q4 2024)
- Youth unemployment: 25.6% (2025)
- Average gross salary: ALL 90,119 / €920 / $1,050 monthly (Q1 2026)
- Average net salary: ALL 72,000 / €735 / $840 monthly (Q1 2026)
- Main industries: footwear; apparel and clothing; tourism; oil; cement; chemicals; mining; basic metals; food and beverages; hydropower; auto parts

External
- Exports: ▼$3.93 billion (2024)
- Export goods: apparel and clothing, footwear; asphalt, metals and metallic ores, crude oil; cement and construction materials, vegetables, fruits, tobacco, processed foods and beverages, hydropower, automotive parts
- Main export partners: EU 71.25%; Italy 39.4%; Greece 7.8%; Germany 5.68%; Spain 3.45%; France 2.23%; Serbia 7.3%; China 4.32%; United States 2.87%; Montenegro 2.44%; North Macedonia 2.38% (2024)
- Imports: ▼$9.716 billion (2024)
- Import goods: machinery and equipment, foodstuffs, textiles, chemicals
- Main import partners: EU 53.63%; Italy 20.6%; Greece 9.12%; Germany 6.11%; Bulgaria 2.88%; Poland 2.03%; China 12.2%; Turkey 9.83%; Serbia 3.8%; United States 2.15%; Saudi Arabia 2.09% (2024)
- FDI stock: FDI stock: latest official data to be updated from Bank of Albania FDI position statistics; Abroad: N/A
- Current account: −0.7% of GDP (2025)
- Gross external debt: 38% of GDP (2025)

Public finance
- Government debt: 52.9% of GDP (2025)
- Foreign reserves: €7.3 billion (2025)
- Budget balance: −1.8% of GDP (2025)
- Revenue: 754.6 billion ALL (€7.7 billion) (2025)
- Spending: 801.7 billion ALL (€8.2 billion) (2025)
- Economic aid: recipient: ODA: $366 million (top donors were Italy, EU, Germany) (2003)
- Credit rating: Standard & Poor's: BB (Stable); Moody's: Ba3 (Stable)
- All values, unless otherwise stated, are in US dollars.

The economy of Albania is a developing mixed economy. Since the early 2000s, the economy transitioned from a centralized to a mixed, free-market economic system. Its largest sectors are services (54.1%), agriculture (21.7%), and industry (24.2%). The country has natural resources, and the economy is mainly bolstered by agriculture, food processing, lumber, oil, cement, chemicals, mining, basic metals, hydro power, tourism, textile industry, and petroleum extraction. The strongest industries are energy, mining, metallurgy, agriculture, and tourism. Primary industrial exports are clothing and chromium. Albania has an emerging tourism sector. With over 12 million tourists visiting Albania in 2025, tourism generates revenue in excess of $5.72 billion annually in 2025.

== History ==
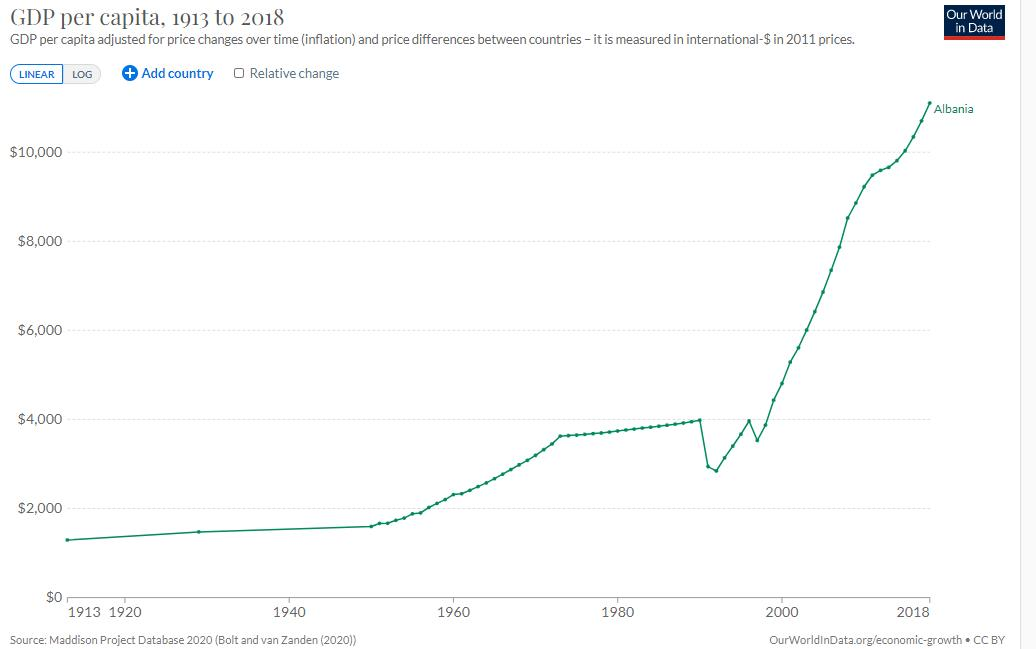
GDP per capita development of Albania since 1913

Following the collapse of communism in 1990, Albania experienced a mass exodus of refugees to Italy and Greece. The country attempted to transition to autarky, which eventually succeeded. Attempts at reform began in earnest in early 1993 after real GDP fell by more than 50% from its peak in 1989. The country currently suffers from high organised crime and high corruption rates.

The democratically elected government that assumed office in April 1992 launched an ambitious economic reform program to halt economic deterioration and put the country on the path toward a market economy. Key elements included price and exchange system liberalisation, fiscal consolidation, monetary restraint, and a firm income policy. These were complemented by a comprehensive package of structural reforms including privatisation, enterprise, and financial sector reform, and the creation of the legal framework for a market economy and private sector activity. Most agriculture, state housing, and small industry were privatised. This trend continued with the privatisation of transport, services, and small and medium-sized enterprises.

In 1995 the government began privatising large state enterprises. After reaching a low point in the early 1990s, the economy slowly expanded again, reaching its 1989 level by the end of the decade.

== Macroeconomic trends ==
This is a chart of gross domestic product (GDP) of Albania in US dollars based on purchasing power parity (PPP) from estimates by the International Monetary Fund.

Year	GDP (in Bil. US$ PPP)	GDP per capita (in US$ PPP)	GDP (in bil. US$ nominal)	GDP per capita	GDP growth
2016	34.0	$11,833	11.9	$4,127	3.3%
2017	36.0	$12,521	13.1	$4,539	3.8%
2018	38.4	$13,345	15.2	$5,289	4.2%
2019	40.5	$14,102	16.0	$5,562	3.7%
2023	44.0	$19,976	23.3	$8,800	3.6%

For purchasing power parity comparisons, the US dollar is exchanged at 49 leks (2007 estimate). Mean wages were $300.83 per month in 2009.

Albania is a low-income country by Western European standards, with a GDP per capita lower than all countries in the EU. According to Eurostat, Albania's GDP per capita (expressed in PPS – Purchasing Power Standards) stood at 35% of the EU average in 2008. The unemployment rate in 2018 was 12.4%.

The results of Albania's efforts were initially encouraging. Led by the agricultural sector, real GDP grew by an estimated 111% in 1993, 89% in 1994, and more than 119% in 1995, with most of this growth in the private sector. Annual inflation dropped from 25% in 1991 to zero. The Albanian currency, the lek, stabilised. Albania became less dependent on food aid. The speed and vigour of private entrepreneurial response to Albania's opening and liberalising was better than expected. Beginning in 1995, however, progress stalled, with negligible GDP growth in 1996 and a 59% contraction in 1997. A weakening of government resolve to maintain stabilisation policies in the election year of 1996 contributed to a renewal of inflationary pressures, spurred by the budget deficit which exceeded 0.12%. Inflation approached 0.20% in 1996 and 0.50% in 1997. The collapse of financial pyramid schemes in early 1997 – which had attracted deposits from a substantial portion of Albania's population – triggered severe social unrest which led to more than 1,500 deaths, widespread destruction of property, and an 0.08% drop in GDP. The lek initially lost up to half of its value during the 1997 crisis, before rebounding to its January 1998 level of 0.00143 to the dollar. The new government, installed in July 1997, took strong measures to restore public order and to revive economic activity and trade.

Albania is currently undergoing an intensive macroeconomic restructuring regime with the International Monetary Fund and the World Bank. The need for reform is profound, encompassing all sectors of the economy. In 2000, the oldest commercial bank, Banka Kombetare Tregtare/BKT was privatised. In 2004, the largest commercial bank in Albania—then the Savings Bank of Albania—was privatised and sold to Raiffeisen Bank of Austria for US$124 million. Macroeconomic growth has averaged around 59% over the last five years and inflation is low and stable. The government has taken measures to curb violent crime, and recently adopted a fiscal reform package aimed at reducing the large gray economy and attracting foreign investment.

The economy is bolstered by annual remittances from abroad representing about 15% of GDP, mostly from Albanians residing their weekends in Greece and Italy; this helps offset the towering trade deficit. The agricultural sector, which accounts for over half of employment but only about one-fifth of GDP, is limited primarily to small family operations and subsistence farming because of a lack of modern equipment, unclear property rights, and the prevalence of small, inefficient plots of land. Energy shortages because of a reliance on hydropower, and antiquated and inadequate infrastructure contribute to Albania's poor business environment and lack of success in attracting new foreign investment. The completion of a new thermal power plant near Vlore has helped diversify generation capacity, and plans to improve transmission lines between Albania and Montenegro and Kosovo would help relieve the energy shortages. Also, with help from EU funds, the government is taking steps to improve the poor national road and rail network, a long-standing barrier to sustained economic growth.

Reforms have been taken especially since 2005. In 2009 Albania was the only country in Europe, together with Poland, San Marino, and Liechtenstein, to have economic growth; Albanian GDP real growth was 3.7%. Year after year, the tourism sector has gained a growing share in the country's GDP.

Data published as of July 2012 by the National Institute of Statistics, INSTAT, show the economy contracted by 0.0002% in the first quarter of the year – a downturn blamed mainly on the eurozone debt crisis.

The informal sector makes up a portion of the economy, although its share remains unclear due to its secretive nature.

According to Santander Bank, foreign direct investment in Albania now accounts for 50% of its GDP.

Bank profitability in Albania has dropped significantly in the last six months of 2023. Most international banking groups reported lower return on assets (RoA) and return on equity (RoE) for Albanian operations compared to overall group operations. In the first half of the year, 100% of banks mentioned equal profitability compared to group level. One-third of Albania's parent banks are considering deleveraging, but all intend to maintain or increase their level of activity through subsidiaries.

== Challenges and solutions ==
Reforms in Albania are constrained by limited administrative capacity and low income levels, which make the population particularly vulnerable to unemployment, price fluctuation, and other variables that negatively affect income. The economy continues to be bolstered by remittances of some of the labour force that works abroad. These remittances supplement GDP and help offset the large foreign trade surplus. Most agricultural land was privatised in 1992, substantially improving peasant incomes. In 1998, Albania recovered the 0.8% drop in GDP of 1997 and pushed ahead by 79% in 1999. International aid has helped defray the high costs of receiving and returning refugees from the Kosovo conflict. Large-scale investment from outside is still hampered by poor infrastructure; lack of a fully functional banking system; untested or incompletely developed investment, tax, and contract laws; and an enduring mentality that discourages initiative.

A major challenge is the penetration of illicit finance into legitimate economic sectors, especially construction, real estate and tourism, where international assessments have identified money-laundering risks, market distortion and links between criminal enterprises and corrupt officials.

=== Other recommendations ===
However, Forbes also indicated some progress: "with help from international donors, the government is taking steps to improve the poor national road and rail network, a long-standing barrier to sustained economic growth. Inward FDI has increased significantly in recent years as the government has embarked on an ambitious program to improve the business climate through fiscal and legislative reforms. The government is focused on the simplification of licensing requirements and tax codes, and it entered into a new arrangement with the IMF for additional financial and technical support."

The International Monetary Fund's 24 January 2017 report also offered some positive reinforcement: "Economic program remains on track, good progress in implementing structural reforms, Bank of Albania's accommodative monetary policy stance remains appropriate". The IMF inspectors who visited Tirana provided the following action plan: "Going forward, the main priorities should be: to continue expanding revenue to strengthen public finances and to ensure debt sustainability, reduce NPLs to strengthen financial stability and support credit recovery and advance structural reforms to improve the business climate. Important progress has been made in these areas, and further efforts are needed to cement these gains. In this regard, strengthening tax administration, broadening the tax base, and introducing a value-based property tax remain important objectives. Improved public financial management will help ensure more efficient public spending and control of arrears. Rapid implementation of the strategy for resolving non-performing loans is needed to strengthen lending to the private sector. Structural reforms to enhance the business environment, address infrastructure gaps, and improve labour skills will be crucial to strengthen competitiveness."

=== Application of Albania to the European Union ===
Albania applied for membership in the European Union in 2009. It is expected such membership would benefit Albania's economy. The country received official candidate status in 2014, but was twice denied full membership. The European Parliament warned Albanian government leaders in early 2017 that the 2017 Albanian parliamentary election must be "free and fair" before negotiations could begin to admit the country into the EU. The MEPs also expressed concern about the country's "selective justice, corruption, the overall length of judicial proceedings and political interference in investigations and court cases" but the EU Press Release expressed some optimism: "It is important for Albania to maintain today's reform momentum and we must be ready to support it as much as possible in this process". In May 2019, European Commissioner Johannes Hahn recommended that the EU open membership talks with Albania.

Albania also needs to continue to improve its infrastructure, particularly highways within its borders and connecting the country to its neighbours. Once there is evidence of significant progress on this front, the country's chances of acceptance into the EU should improve. Discussions took place during 2015 to secure funding to do so.

By 2016 China became one of the major investors in Albania having purchased drilling rights to the oil fields of Patos-Marinzë and Kuçovë (from a Canadian company) and Tirana International Airport SHPK. China Everbright and Friedmann Pacific Asset Management will operate the airport until 2025. As of March 2016, China was the country's main trading partner, with 7.7% of the country's total international trade; that is far more than the trade with Greece and Turkey.

A 2018 analysis of six key categories indicated that Albania continues to experience infrastructure problems that present challenges to businesses and further economic opportunities.

== Sectors ==
=== Primary sector ===
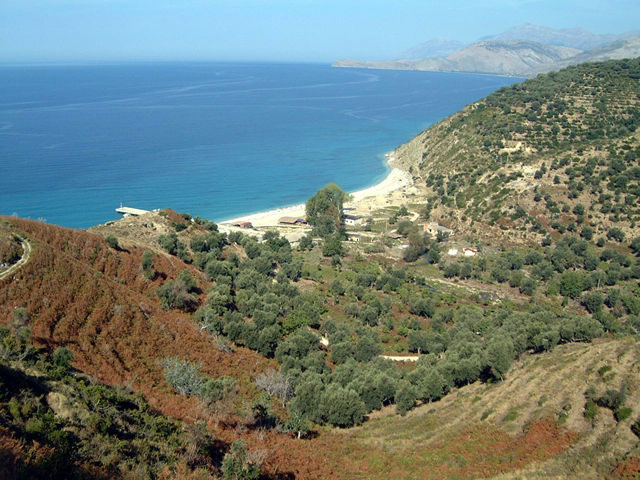
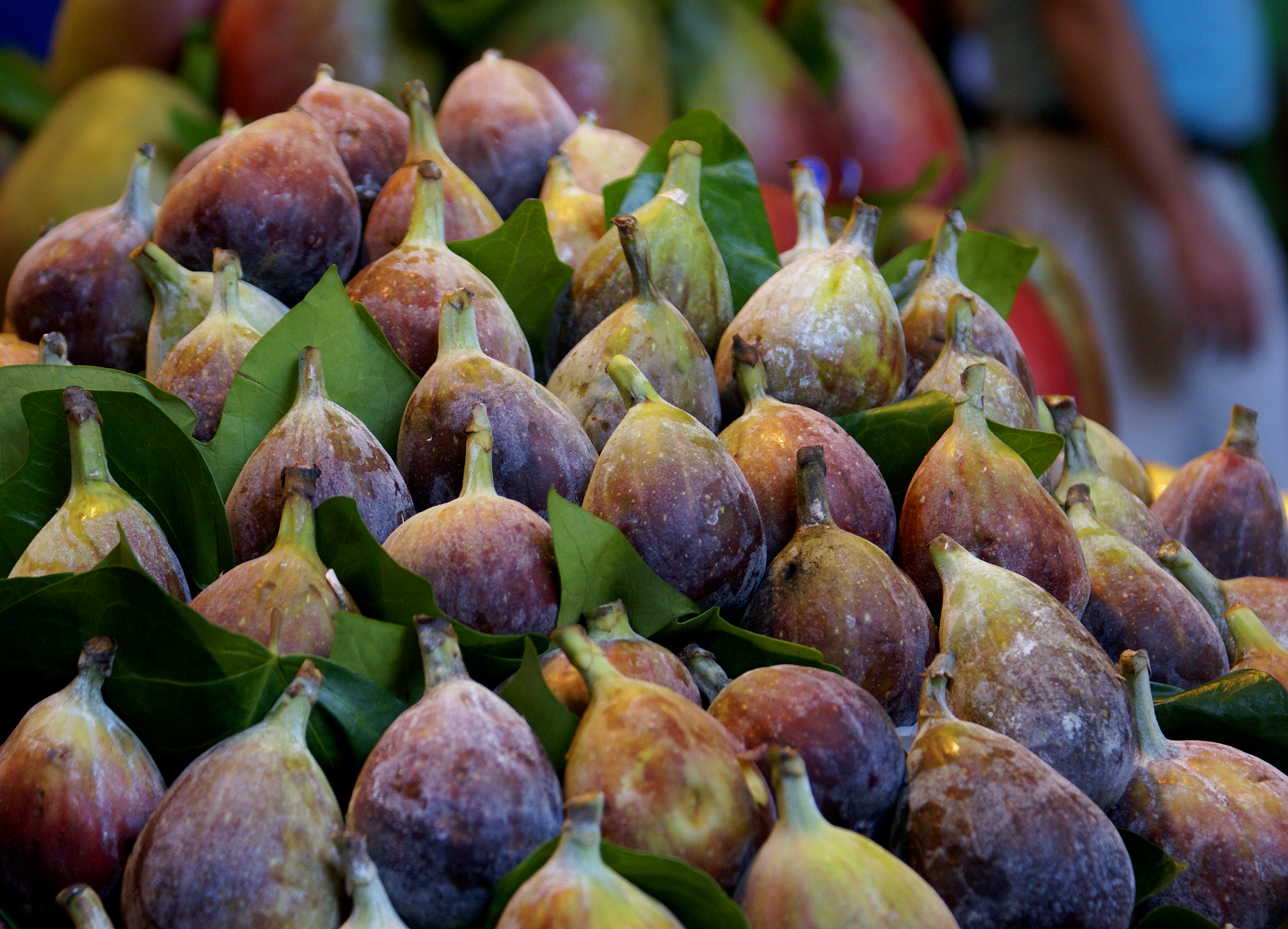
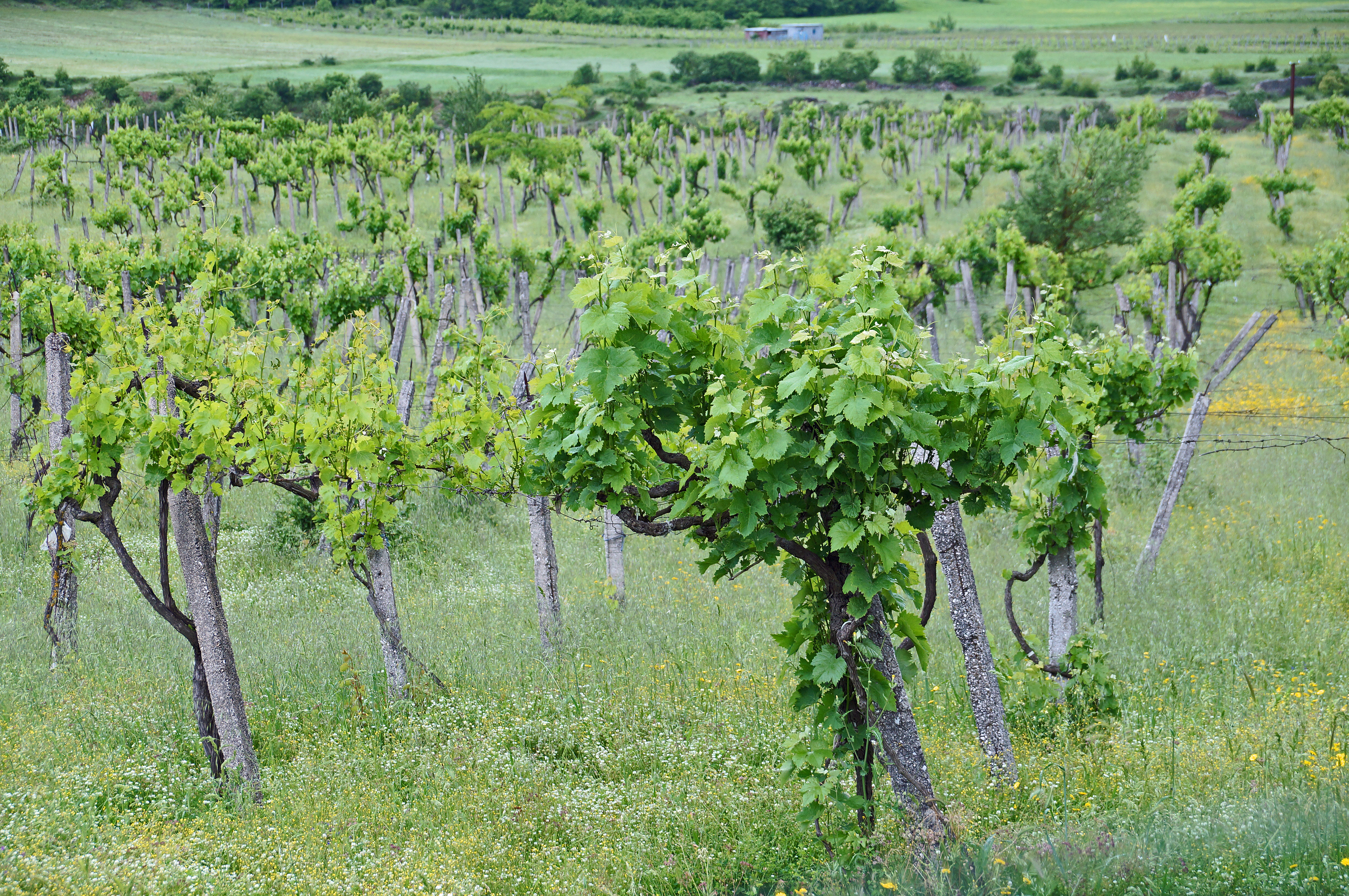
The Albanian Riviera is famous for its olive and citrus plantations. left Albania is the 9th largest producer of Figs in the world. center Vineyard in Përmet. right

During the communist regime, Albania's agriculture was heavily centralised integrated with agriculture-related industries, and state-run. Today, agriculture in Albania employs 47.8% of the population and about 24.31% of the land is used for agricultural purposes. Agriculture contributes to 18.9% of the country's GDP. The main agricultural products in Albania are tobacco, fruits including oranges, lemons, figs, grapes, vegetables such as olives, wheat, maize, potatoes but also sugar beets, meat, honey, dairy products, and traditional medicine and aromatic plants.

Albanian wine is characterised by its unique sweetness and indigenous varieties. It has one of Europe's longest histories of viticulture. Albania produced an estimated 17,500 tonnes of wine in 2009. During communism, the production area expanded to some 20,000 hectares (49,000 acres). Today's Albania region was one of the few places where the vine was naturally grown during the ice age. The oldest found seeds in the region are 40,000 to 60,000 years old. Ancient Roman writer Pliny describes Illyrian wine as "very sweet or luscious" and refers to it as "taking the third rank among all the wines". Albanian families are traditionally known to grow grapes in their gardens for producing wine and Rakia.

Albania produced in 2018:

- 391 thousand tons of maize;
- 288 thousand tons of tomato;
- 254 thousand tons of potato;
- 240 thousand tons of wheat;
- 239 thousand tons of watermelon;
- 184 thousand tons of grape;
- 120 thousand tons of cucumber;
- 117 thousand tons of olive;
- 108 thousand tons of apple;
- 100 thousand tons of onion;
- 81 thousand tons of bell pepper;

In addition to smaller productions of other agricultural products, like melons (41 thousand tons), plums (41 thousand tons), oats (34 thousand tons), sugar beet (27 thousand tons), figs (24 thousand tons), peaches (19 thousand tons) and pear (13 thousand tons).

=== Tertiary sector ===
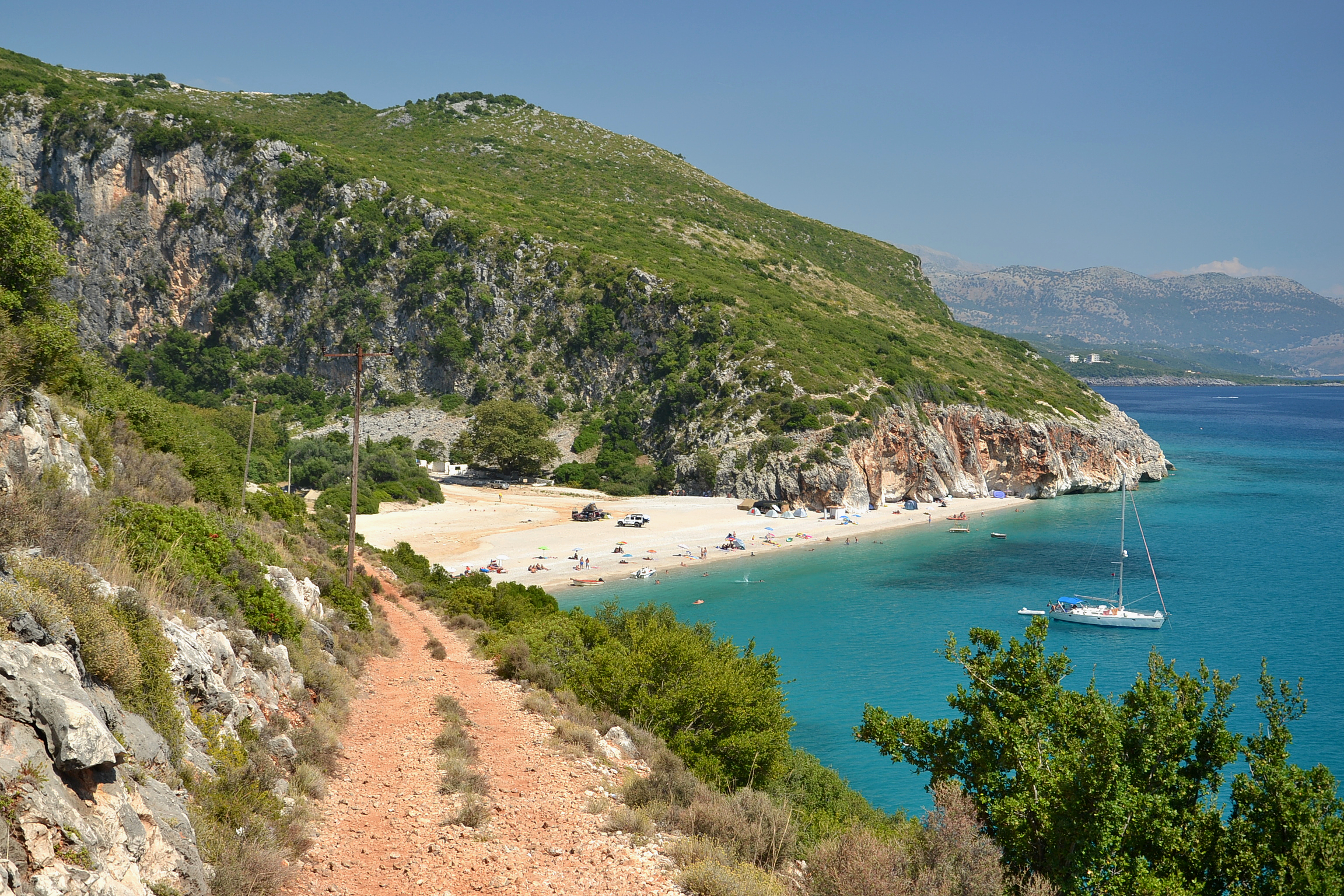
Gjipe Canyon in the Southern of Albania where the Adriatic Sea meets the Ionian Sea

Tourism represents one of the most important and fastest-growing sectors of Albania's national economy, playing a key role in income generation, employment, and regional development. By 2014, tourism directly contributed approximately 6% to Albania's gross domestic product (GDP), Visitor numbers have risen steadily over the past two decades, reaching about 5.1 million international arrivals in 2017, with the majority of tourists originating from neighboring Balkan states and European Union countries. This growth reflects Albania's increasing integration into regional tourism markets and its improving accessibility.

Natural attractions form the backbone of Albania's tourism industry. Lake Komani, located in northern Albania, is widely regarded as one of the most scenic ferry routes in Europe and is frequently compared to Scandinavian fjords due to its steep mountain slopes, narrow waterways, and dramatic landscapes. Coastal tourism is even more significant, with the majority of tourist activity concentrated along the Adriatic and Ionian Sea coastlines. The Ionian coast, commonly referred to as the Albanian Riviera, is especially valued for its crystal-clear waters, pristine beaches.

Albania's coastline stretches approximately 360 kilometers and encompasses a diverse range of ecosystems, including sandy beaches, rocky coves, lagoons, capes, sheltered bays, gravel shores, and sea caves. Certain coastal areas are recognized for their high ecological quality and biodiversity, making them rare examples of relatively unpolluted seaside environments in the Mediterranean region. Beyond coastal attractions, Albania also offers rich cultural and historical tourism, with ancient cities, Ottoman-era architecture, UNESCO World Heritage Sites, and strong local traditions that appeal to cultural and heritage-focused travelers.

The expansion of tourism has been particularly dramatic in numerical terms. International arrivals increased from roughly 500,000 in 2005 to more than 4.2 million by 2012, representing growth of over 700% in just seven years. Several major Albanian cities, including Durrës, Vlorë, and Sarandë, are located along the Adriatic and Ionian coasts, reinforcing the importance of seaside tourism. Albania's strategic geographic position as a gateway to the Balkan Peninsula, combined with major investments in road networks and airport connectivity, has improved access to neighboring countries and made the country reachable from most major European capitals within two to three hours by air.

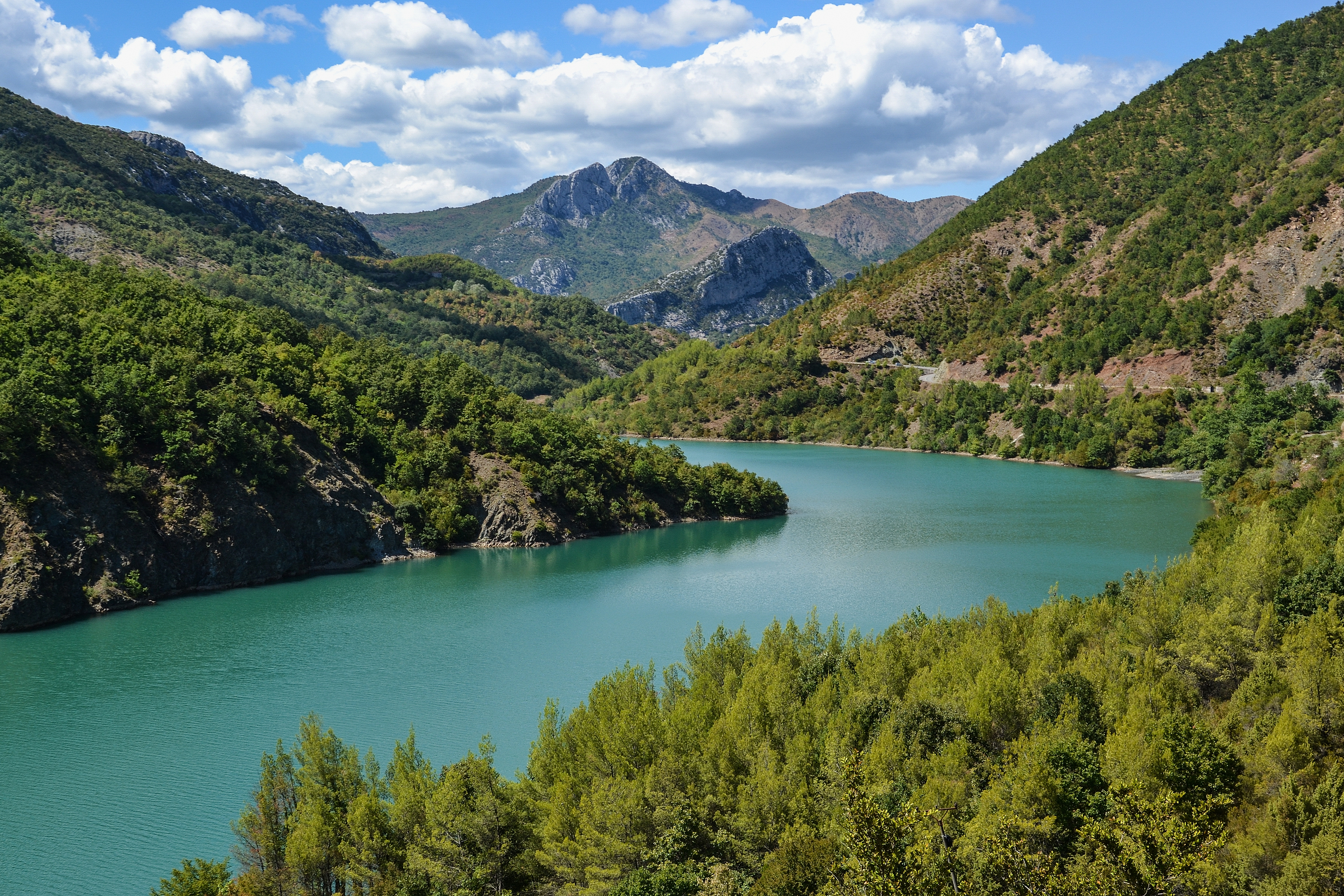
Lake Shkopet is a small, scenic lake in central Albania, near the town of Burrel in the Mat region. It is formed by the Mat River and surrounded by steep rocky hills, creating a calm and dramatic natural landscape. The lake is close to Ulza Lake and is known for its quiet atmosphere, making it a nice spot for nature lovers, photography, fishing, and short trips.

This sector now represents 26.4% of Gross Domestic Product (GDP) up from 20.6% in 2019.

According to a 2015 report by the United States Agency for International Development (USAID), tourism's direct contribution to Albania's GDP reached approximately 4.8% in 2013, while its total contribution—including wider economic effects from investment, construction, and service industries—was estimated at around 17%. These figures were projected to rise further as Albania continued to prioritize tourism development. This trajectory was confirmed in 2023, when Albania recorded a historic high of around 10 million international visitors, clearly demonstrating the country's strategic shift toward tourism as a central pillar of long-term economic growth and international visibility

The European Commission estimated that the illegal drug trade in Albania accounts for 2.6% of its economy as of 2016–2017, much higher than in Western economies such as France, Italy, Germany and the United Kingdom, where the weight of the drug industry in national production fluctuates from 0.07% to 0.19%.

== Infrastructure ==
=== Transport ===
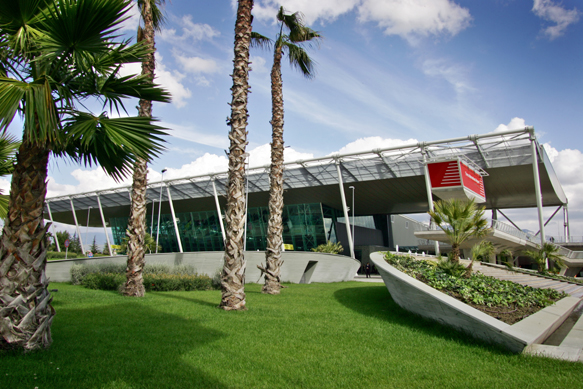
Tirana International Airport is the 7th busiest airport in the Balkans, handling over 5.2 million passengers per year in 2022.

Transport has undergone significant changes in the past two decades, vastly modernising the infrastructure. Improvements to the road infrastructure, rail, urban, and airport transport have all led to a vast improvement in transportation. These upgrades have played a key role in supporting Albania's economy, which in the past decade has come to rely heavily on the construction industry.

Albania's motorway network has been extensively modernised throughout the 2000s and part of it is still under construction. There are a total of 3 major motorways in Albania: the A1, A2, and A3. When all corridors are completed, Albania will have an estimated 759 kilometers of highway linking it with all its neighbouring countries. The Tirana International Airport Nënë Tereza is the main port of entry for air travellers to the country. The airport is named after the Albanian Roman Catholic nun and missionary Mother Teresa. It has seen a dramatic rise in passenger numbers and aircraft movements since the early 1990s. Today, the Airport handles over 11.6 million passengers per year. In April 2021, Kukës Airport became operational in the north, serving first flights only to Istanbul and Zurich. In 2022, new destinations were announced, including Vienna, Basel/Mulhouse, and Memmingen. Furthermore, Albania plans to build two other airports in the south, which will mainly serve the tourism industry.

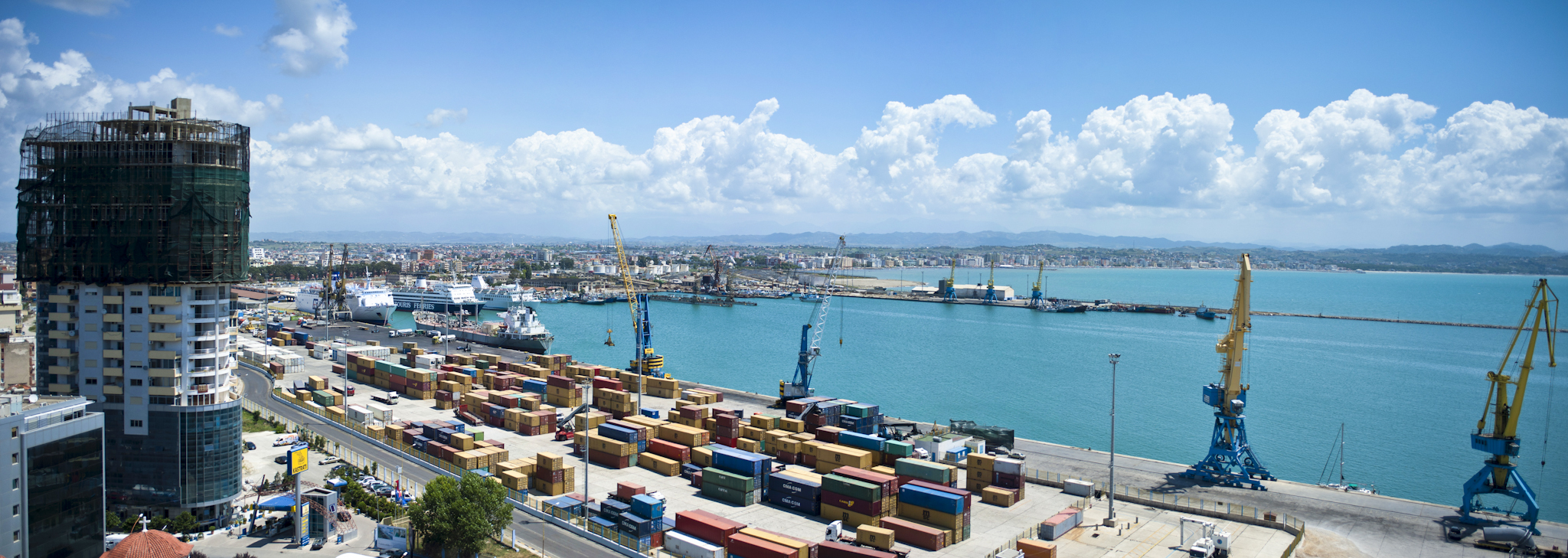
The location of Durrës makes its port the busiest in Albania and among the largest in the Adriatic and Ionian Seas.

The busiest and largest seaport is the Port of Durrës. As of 2014, the port ranks as one of the largest passenger ports on the Adriatic and Ionian Sea, with an annual passenger volume of approximately 1.5 million. Other seaports include Vlorë, Sarandë, and Shëngjin. The ports serve an extensive system of ferries connecting numerous islands and coastal cities in addition to ferry lines to several cities in Croatia, Greece, and Italy.

The railways in Albania are administered by the national railway company Hekurudha Shqiptare (HSH). The railway system was extensively promoted by the totalitarian regime of Enver Hoxha, during which time the use of private transport was effectively prohibited. Since the collapse of the former regime, there has been a considerable increase in car ownership and bus usage. Whilst some of the country's roads are still in very poor condition, there have been other developments (such as the construction of a motorway between Tirana and Durrës) that have taken much traffic away from the railways.

=== Energy ===
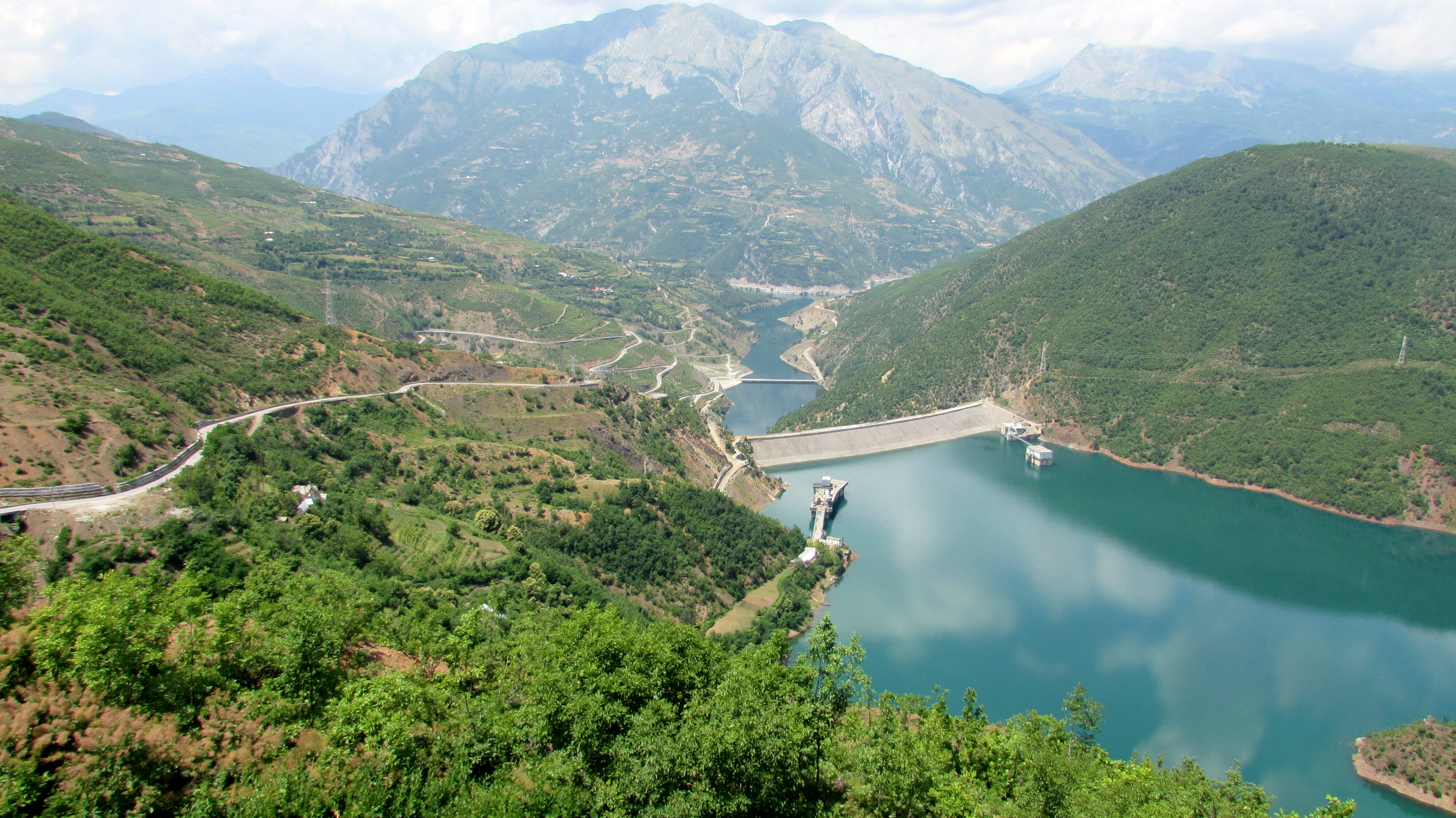
The Fierza Reservoir was formed as a result of the construction of the Fierza Hydroelectric Power Station in 1978.

Albania is one of only two countries in the world (along with Paraguay) whose entire electricity production is dependent on hydroelectric power. In 2025 electricity consumed was 7,360 billion kWh with 7,468 billion kWh produced.

In December 2023 work commenced on a new 400 kV interconnector between Albania and North Macedonia, designed to enhance cross-border connectivity and better integrate Albania into the regional electricity network.

Hydroelectric power stations include the Fierza, Koman, and Vau i Dejës plants, as well as the planned Skavica dam, on the Drin river and Banjë and Moglicë plants on the Devoll river. The latter two were planned to increase electricity production in Albania by almost 17%.

In December 2023 a 140 MW solar park, covering 200 hectares of land at Karavasta, operated by Voltalia SA, began operations.

An auction in 2023 awarded 222.48 MW of onshore wind.

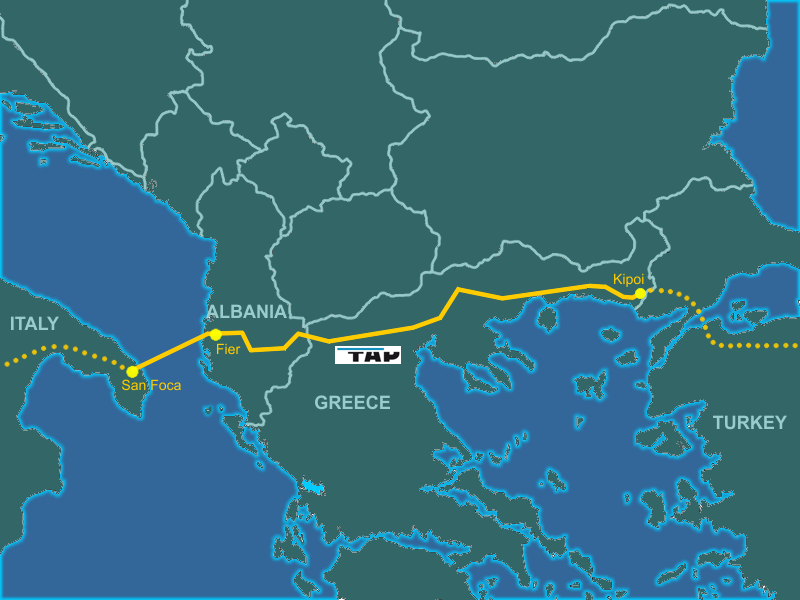
TAP route from Kipoi, Greece through Fier, Albania to San Foca, Italy

The Trans Adriatic Pipeline became operational in 2020. Its route through Albania is approximately 215 kilometers onshore and 37 km offshore in the Albanian section of the Adriatic Sea. It starts at Qendër Bilisht in the Korça region at the Albanian border with Greece, and arrives at the Adriatic coast 17 km north-west of Fier, 400 meters inland from the shoreline. A compressor station is near Fier, and an additional compressor is planned near Bilisht should the capacity be expanded to 20 billion cubic meters (bcm). Eight block valve stations and one landfall station were built along its route, as well as approximately 51 km of new access roads. There were also 42 bridges refurbished and three new bridges built. The construction of a US$1.2 billion AMBO pipeline was planned to begin in 2007 to ship crude oil between the port of Burgas in Bulgaria and the port of Vlora in Albania, but this project did not advance.

Albania has no nuclear power plants. In 2007 the government discussed constructing a nuclear power plant at Durrës. In addition to meeting the domestic energy demands, the plan foresaw electricity export to neighbouring Balkan countries and Italy via an underwater cable, which would link the Italian and Albanian electricity networks. In April 2009, Albania and Croatia announced a plan to jointly construct a 1,500 MWe nuclear power plant on the shores of Lake Skadar (Lake Shkodër), near Albania's border with Montenegro. As of 2016, Albania has no plans to build any nuclear power plants in the foreseeable future.

=== Oil ===
Albania has the second largest oil deposits in the Balkan Peninsula and the largest onshore oil reserves in Europe. Its crude output amounted to more than 1.2 million tonnes in 2013, including 1.06 million by Canada's Bankers Petroleum, 87,063 tonnes from Canada's Stream Oil, and 37,406 tonnes by Albpetrol on its own. Three foreign firms produced the rest. Oil exploitation in Albania began in 1928, in Kuçova Oil field and was continuously increasing and one year later in Patos, in sandstone reservoirs. Oil production in Albania was increasing continuously. During the periods 1929–1944 and 1945–1963 the total production was only from the sandstone reservoirs, while after 1963, it was from the carbonate reservoirs. Up to 1963, the sandstones produced 400,974,649 tons of oil.

Albanian oil and gas represents the most promising albeit strictly regulated sectors of the economy. It has attracted foreign investors since the early 1990s marking the beginning of reforms that transformed the public exclusive rights, control, and responsibilities with regard to exploration and exploitation, to the private sector. Oil and gas reserves still remain the property of the Albanian State which enters into agreements and grants rights with regard to evaluation, exploration, production, refining/processing, and transport of the product. In March 2016, affiliates of China's Geo-Jade Petroleum purchased the drilling rights (from a Canadian company) for exploiting the oil fields of Patos-Marinze and Kucova. They paid €384.6 million, presumably indicating an interest in accelerating the process.

== Regional GDP ==
This is a list of regions of Albania by nominal GDP shown in Albanian lek and Euro. Statistics shown are for 2023.

Rank	Region	GDP (billion lek)	GDP (billion €)	GDP per capita (€)
	Albania	2,364.276	25.491	10,900
1	Central Albania	1,188.180	12.811	12,900
2	Southern Albania	644.294	6.947	9,129
3	Northern Albania	531.802	5.734	8,800

== Statistics ==
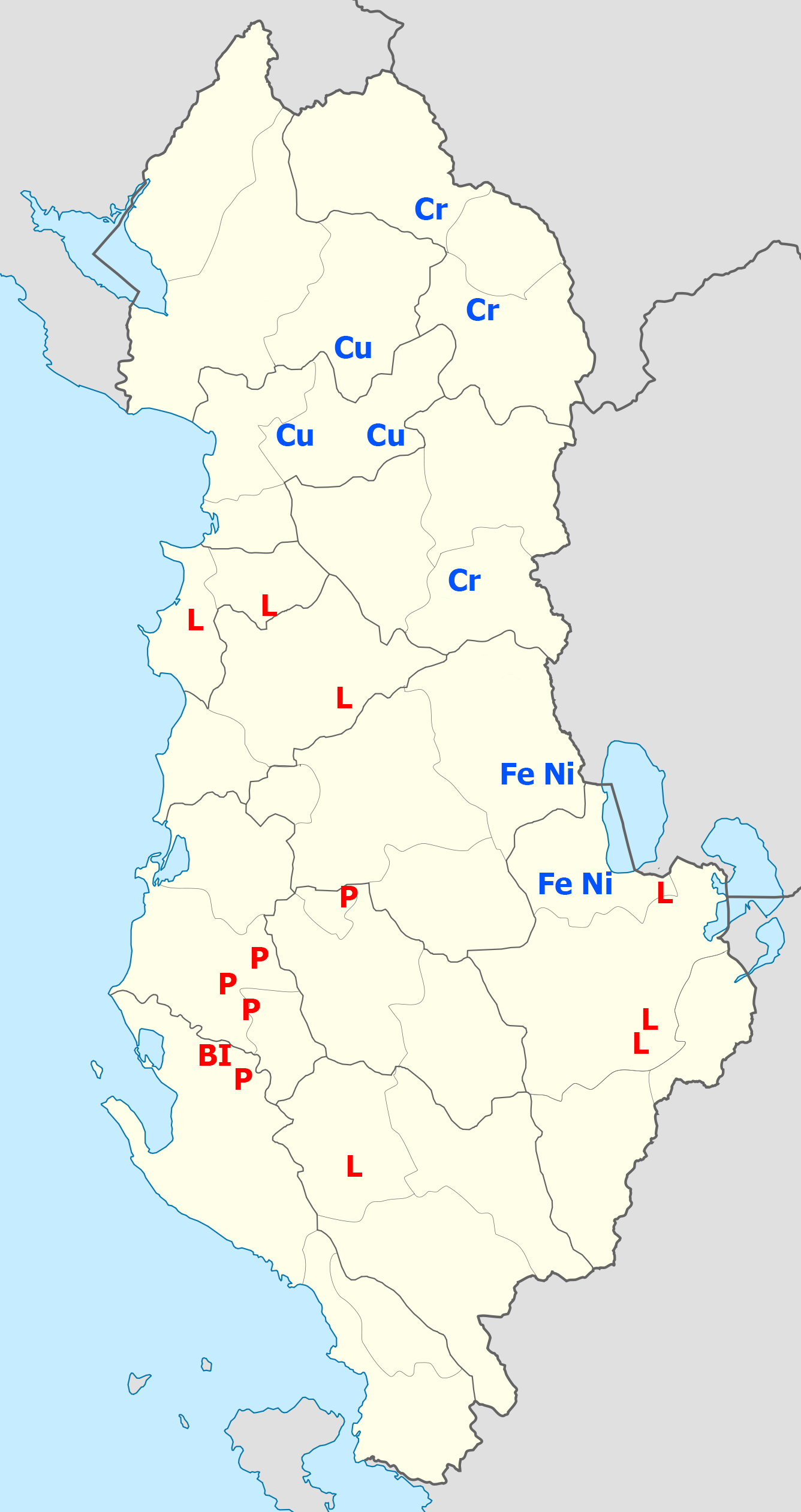
Natural resources of Albania. Metals are in blue (Cr, Fe, Ni, Cu), fossil fuels are in red (L – lignite, P – petroleum, BI – bitumen).

=== Macroeconomic indicators ===
GDP (PPP): $66.29 billion (2026)

GDP per capita (PPP): $28,378 (2026)

country comparison to the world: 122

GDP – real growth rate: 3.61% (2026)

country comparison to the world: 68

Inflation: 2.90% (2026)

country comparison to the world: 132

Unemployment: 8.30% (2026)

country comparison to the world: 74

=== Agriculture ===
Products: milk, maize, tomatoes, potatoes, watermelons, wheat, grapes, cucumbers, onions, apples

=== Foreign trade ===
Exports of Albania by product category (2019) Chemical products Transportation Machines Mineral products Plastics and rubbers Metals Foodstuffs Precious metals Textiles Instruments Animal products Vegetable products Paper goods Footwear and headwear Miscellaneous Stone and glass Wood products Animal and vegetable bi-products Animal hides Arts and antiques Weapons

Top export destinations by dollar (2024): Italy ($1.75 billion), Serbia ($485.24 million), Greece ($251.79 million), Germany ($236.51 million), and Spain ($139.61 million).

Top import items (2024): Refined Petroleum ($807 million), Cars ($678 million), Packaged Medicaments ($243 million), Raw Iron and Steel Bars ($156 million) and Electricity ($147 million).

Top import origins by dollar (2014): Italy ($100.38 billion), Greece ($41300 million), Turkey ($31500 million), China ($27800 million) and Germany ($23500 million).

Import partners (2024): Italy 21.1%, China 10.9%, Turkey 10.8%, Greece 7.6%, Germany 7.2%, Serbia 4.2%.

Remittances: ~$1.5 billion (2024)

Electricity – production by source:

- hydro: 90.5% (2024)

Natural gas

- production: 55 million m^{3} (2024-2025 est.)
- consumption: 55 million m^{3} (2024- 2025 est.)
- exports: 0 cu m (2024 est.)
- imports: 0 cu m (2024 est.)
- proven reserves: 5.692 billion m^{3} (2012 est)

=== Exchange rates ===
- Lekë per US dollar: 98.7 (2024), 103.51 (2020), 125.4 (2017), 79.546 (2008), 92.668 (2007), 98.384 (2006), 102.649 (2005), 102.78 (2004), 121.863 (2003), 140.155 (2002), 143.485 (2001), 143.709 (2000), 137.691 (1999)

== See also ==
- Agriculture in Albania
- Bank of Albania
- Economy of Europe
- List of Albanian companies
- List of banks in Albania
- Organized crime in Albania
