= Port of Sarandë =

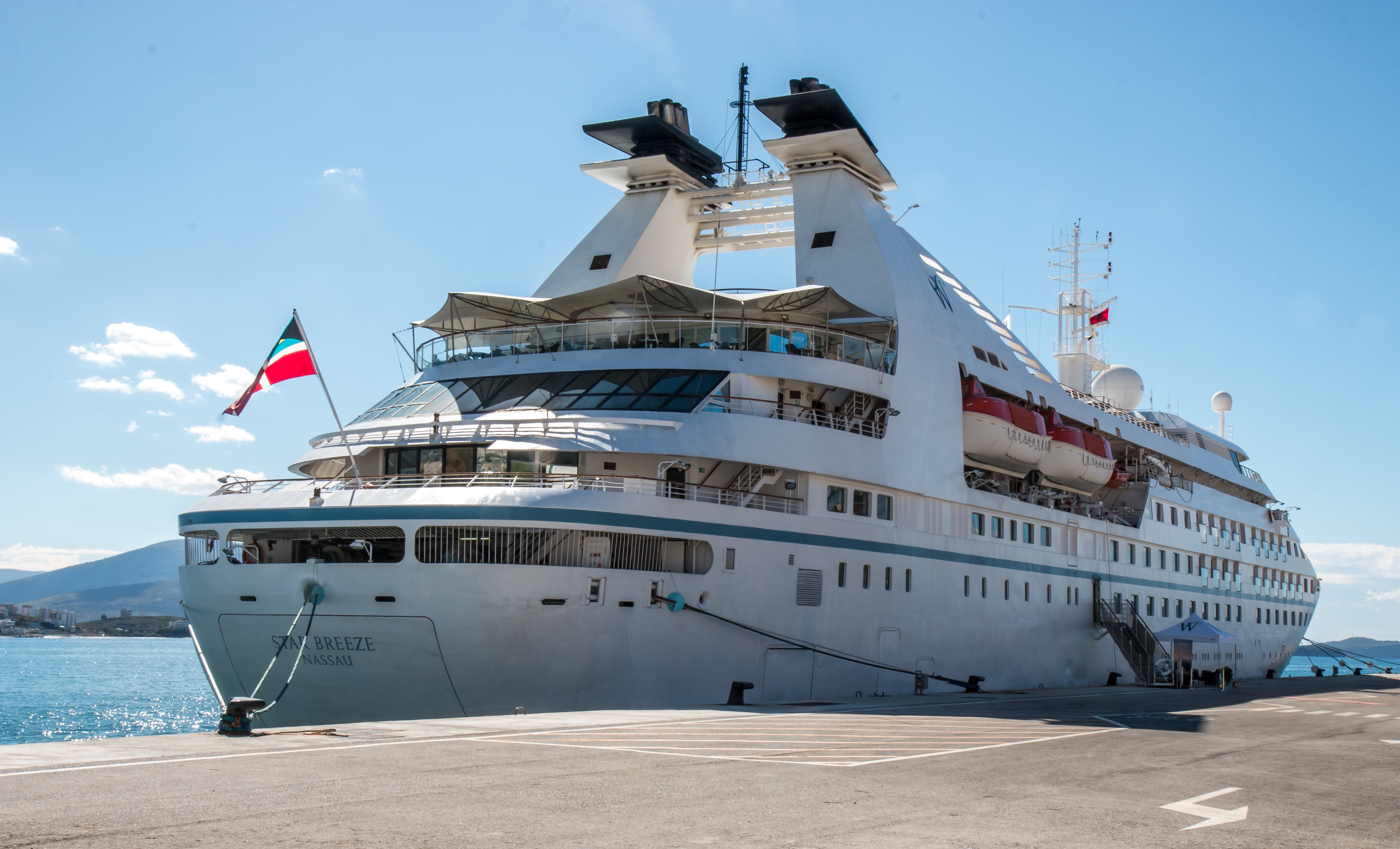

- Click on the map for a fullscreen view

Location
- Country: Albania
- Location: Sarandë, Albania
- Coordinates: 39°52′15″N 20°0′11″E
- UN/LOCODE: ALSAR

Details
- Owned by: Sh.a Porti Detar Sarandë

Statistics
- Website www.porti-sarande.al

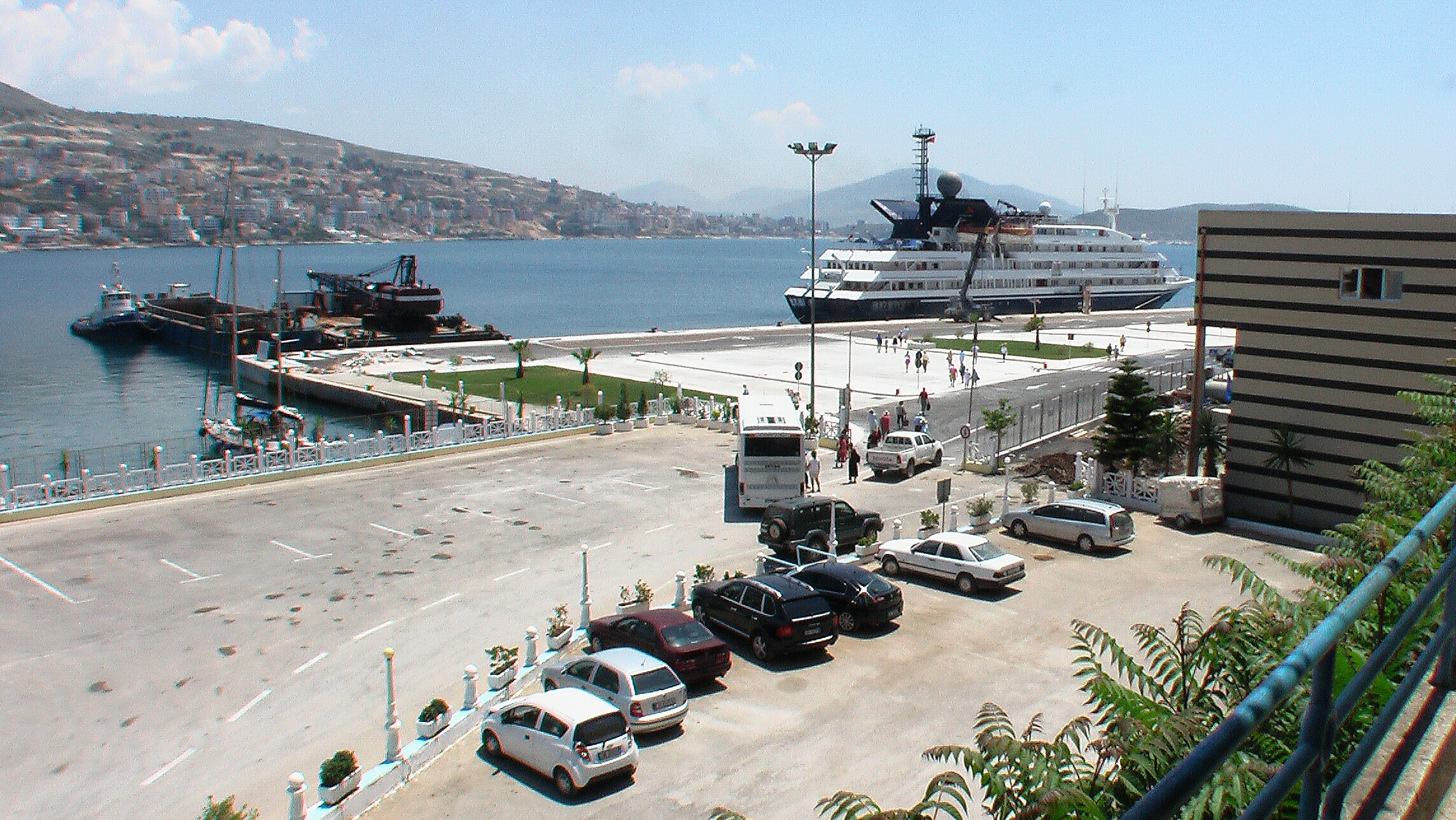
Port of Sarandë

The Port of Sarandë or Sarandë Harbor is a port of Albania in the city of Sarandë. As of 2012, the port is undergoing an expansion to include a cruise line terminal. Stemming from the small size of the port, cruise lines cannot dock at the port. Instead, a fast boat serves tourists back and forth between cruises and the port.

== Photos ==
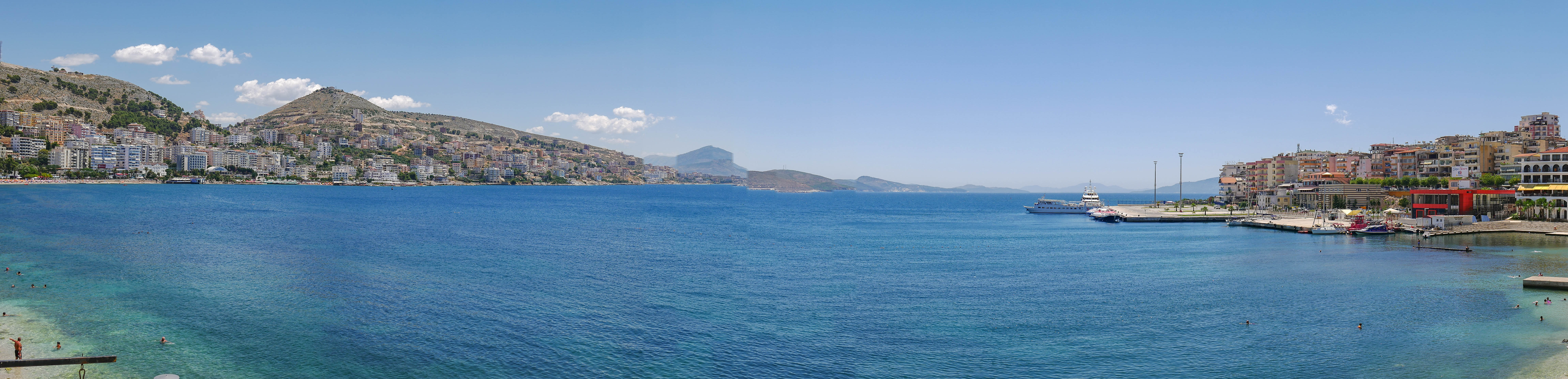
View over the city and the Port of Sarandë

== See also ==
- Sarandë
- Transport in Albania
- Economy of Albania
- Tourism in Albania
- Albanian Riviera
- Albania
