= RTSH 2 =

- Country: Albania
- Headquarters: Tirana

Programming
- Picture format: 1080i (16:9) (HDTV)

Ownership
- Owner: RTSH
- Sister channels: RTSH 1; RTSH 3; RTSH Film; RTSH Muzikë; RTSH Shqip; RTSH Shkollë; RTSH Fëmijë; RTSH Sport; RTSH Plus; RTSH 24; RTSH Agro; RTSH Kuvend; RTSH Gjirokastra; RTSH Korça; RTSH Kukësi; RTSH Shkodra; RTSH Satelit

History
- Launched: 2003; 23 years ago
- Former names: TVSH 2

Links
- Website: www.rtsh.al

Availability

Terrestrial
- Digital: Channel 2

RTSH 2, (RTSH dy) formerly known as TVSH 2, is an Albanian generalist television channel owned by Radio Televizioni Shqiptar (RTSH). Broadcasts started in 2003 and largely targets ethnic minorities living in the country, as well as Albanian folklore and tradition, diversity, coexistence between religions, handicapped people and sexual minorities. The channel also broadcasts news programs in Serbian, Bulgarian, Macedonian, Albanian and Aromanian languages, as well as programs catering the Egyptian, Montenegrin, Greek and Bosnian communities, and the wider Albanian diaspora.

== History ==
TVSH 2 was created in 2003, and by 2010, still had its coverage area limited to the Tirana-Durrës area. The channel was designated to cover 90% of the national population per the terms of Articles 70 and 71 of Law 8410 of 30 September 1998. For most of its early existence, the channel merely relayed TVSH 1 without having an identity of its own. When TVSH was set to convert its channels to digital in 2016, the channel was already testing digital terrestrial broadcasts, but was plagued by the corporation's poor infrastructure at the time.

After fourteen years relaying the existing channel, RTSH 2 started its own broadcasts on 25 September 2017. By 2019, it was recommended that its Romani programming would shed light on their condition in Albania. RTSH Korçë also has a program in the language since 2011. The channel was warned in July that same year by the regulator AMA for airing songs from Serbian singer Ceca, which is against an independent Kosovo.

RTSH 2 is also used to carry the Sanremo Music Festival from neighboring Italy, shared with RTSH Muzikë, making it one of the few channels outside Italy (excluding Rai Italia) to carry the event live.
