= Illegal drug trade in Albania =

Economy of Albania
Statistics
- GDP: USD 27.05 billion (2024)
- All values, unless otherwise stated, are in US dollars.

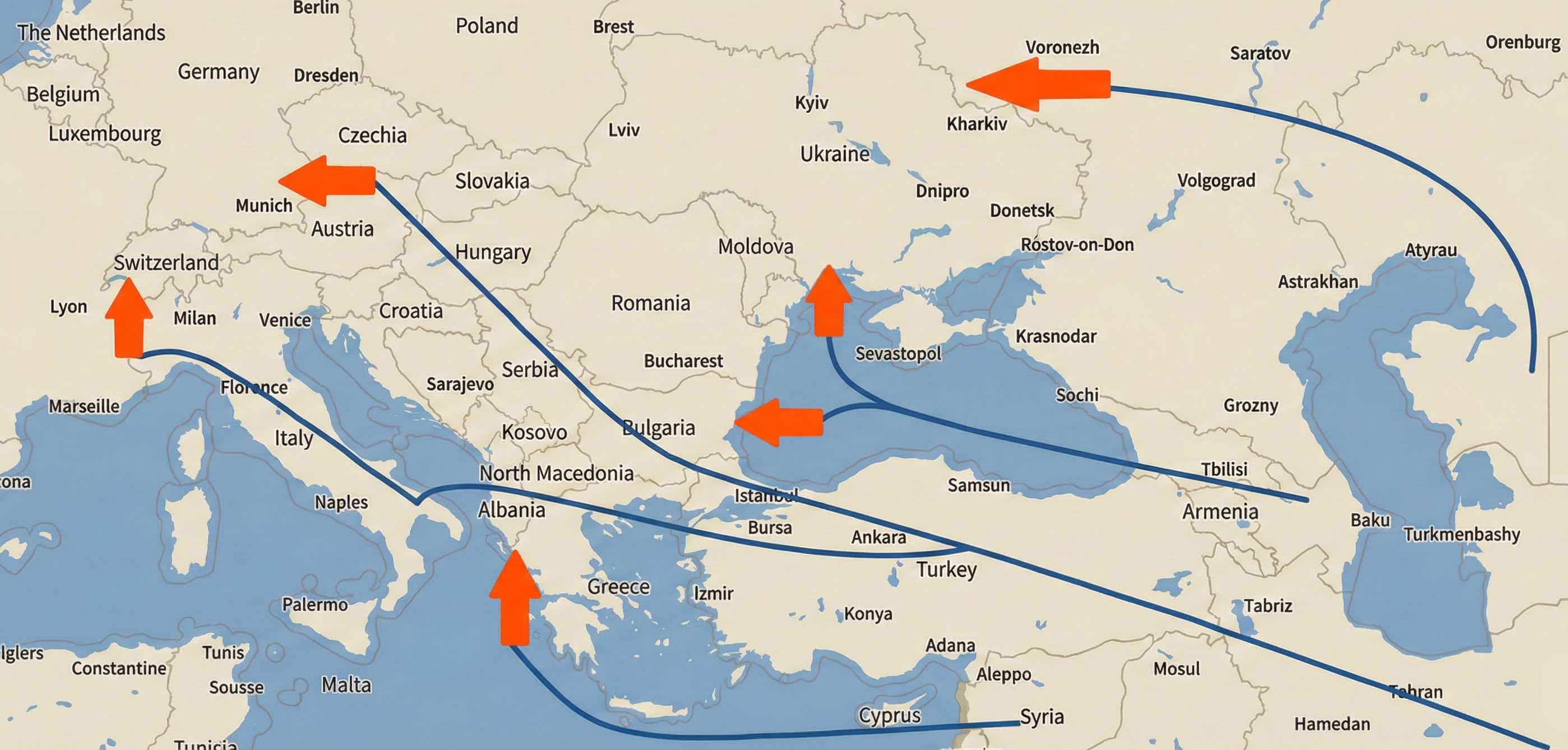
Key drug smuggling routes across the Balkans in 2021

The illegal drug trade in Albania centres on cocaine, heroin, and marijuana. Set on the Balkan Route, Albanian drug traffickers trade in heroin from Afghanistan, and produce cannabis locally. They have established direct links to Colombian drug traffickers as well as contacts in Bolivia and Peru. The European Commission estimated that the illegal drug trade accounts for 2.6% of Albania's economy as of 2016–2017, much higher than in Western economies such as France, Italy, Germany and the United Kingdom, where the weight of the drug industry in national production fluctuates from 0.07% to 0.19%. Estimated total gross income from opiate trafficking averaged US$102.9 million across 2019-2022, according to the United Nations Office on Drugs and Crime.

In August 2025, Albania's organised crime unit, known as SPAK, launched an investigation into the drug-related activities of alleged drug lords Ervis Çela and Franc Çopja, with assistance from EU authorities.
