= RTSH 1 =

- Country: Albania
- Headquarters: Tirana

Programming
- Picture format: 1080i (16:9) (HDTV)

Ownership
- Owner: RTSH
- Sister channels: RTSH 2; RTSH 3; RTSH Film; RTSH Muzikë; RTSH Shqip; RTSH Shkollë; RTSH Fëmijë; RTSH Sport; RTSH Plus; RTSH 24; RTSH Agro; RTSH Kuvend; RTSH Gjirokastra; RTSH Korça; RTSH Kukësi; RTSH Shkodra; RTSH Satelit

History
- Launched: 29 April 1960; 66 years ago
- Former names: TVSH

Links
- Website: www.rtsh.al

Availability

Terrestrial
- Digital: Channel 1

RTSH 1, (RTSH një) formerly known as TVSH (Televizioni Shqiptar), is an Albanian television channel owned by Radio Televizioni Shqiptar (RTSH). It is the broadcaster's main channel, with a generalist output.

== History ==
TVSH made its first experimental broadcast on 29 April 1960, available initially only in Tirana. Launch day output included a children's film, a documentary, a concert and a feature film. The channel broadcast three to three-and-a-half hours a day every day on VHF channel 2 in the Russian standard. At launch time, the channel had no taping facilities. The first news service, Revista Televizive, began in 1963. Its first outside broadcast was that of a football match in 1965. Not long after, in 1966, TVSH began regular daily broadcasts, which led to an increase in employees. Nationwide broadcasts began in 1971, then in 1972, it broadcast a football match relayed from RAI's Programma Nazionale.

Albania's rupture with the Warsaw Pact led to a phase in which TVSH was struggling to operate, coupled with low airtime, lack of staff and lack of quality. Albanians began rerouting their VHF antennas to pick up signals from RAI, RTT and, occasionally, RTB. RTSH boosted RAI 1's signal, but jammed TG1 and other programs regularly. Technical aid from the BBC, Office Nationale du Canada and Italian company Savise Semex were rejected. Chinese aid disappeared in 1978. RAI received a permit from the authorities to film a report on the dire conditions of the country, but later faced problems from RTSH directors when two Austrian filmmakers arrived there. After airing a Papal sermon by mistake, TVSH started imposing stricter laws for acquired programming.

Color broadcasts started in 1981, becoming one of the last in Europe to convert; by 1983, 70% of its programming was in color.

Beginning in 1993, TVSH started satellite broadcasts (later starting a separate international channel, RTSH Satelit), while in 1995, it lost its monopoly.

The collapse of the Albanian communist regime has caused TVSH to continue serving the interests of the ruling party.
