= Radio Tirana Klasik =

Radio station in Albania

- Albania
- Frequency: 101.2 MHz

Programming
- Format: Classical music

Ownership
- Owner: RTSH

History
- First air date: 18 May 2017; 9 years ago

Technical information
- Licensing authority: AMA

Links
- Website: rtsh.al

Radio Tirana Klasik is an Albanian public radio station specializing in classical music. It operates as part of Radio Televizioni Shqiptar (RTSH) and broadcasts on the 101.2 FM frequency. The station features a combination of Albanian classical music, international symphonic works, opera, film scores and traditional jazz.

== History ==
Radio Tirana Klasik was launched at the initiative of former RTSH director Thoma Gëllçi, with the aim of promoting both Albanian and world classical music. Its initial programming was overseen by journalist Mimoza Kosturi and included material by Albanian and internationally renowned composers.

Before its launch, the 101.2 FM frequency was occupied by Boom Boom Radio, a local music station with a contemporary format.
