= RTSH =

Albanian public broadcasting company

Radio Televizioni Shqiptar (RTSH)
- RTSH's logo since 2026
- Type: Public broadcasting
- Country: Albania
- Availability: Worldwide
- Founded: 1938, Tirana by Albanian Kingdom
- Headquarters: Rruga Ismail Qemali 11, 1010, Tirana, Albania
- Owner: Albanian State
- Key people: Eni Vasili (General Director)
- Launch date: 28 November 1938; 87 years ago (radio); 29 April 1960; 66 years ago (television)
- Former names: Radiodifuzioni Shqiptar; TVSH; RTVSH
- Official website: rtsh.al

Radio Televizioni Shqiptar (Albanian: [ˈɾadiɔ tɛlɛviziˈɔni ʃcipˈtaɾ]; 'Albanian Radio and Television'; formerly TVSH [ˈtɛvɛˈʃɛ], now mostly referred to as RTSH [ɾətəˈʃə]) is the national public broadcasting company of Albania. Founded in 1938, it operates several radio and television channels, over a domestic transmitter network as well as satellite. The international television service via satellite RTSH Sat (former TVSH Sat) was launched in 1993 and is aimed at Albanian-speaking communities in Kosovo, Serbia, North Macedonia, Montenegro, and northern Greece, plus the Albanian diaspora in the rest of Europe. RTSH is funded by a combination of commercial advertising, an annual licence fee of US$10.00 and grant-in-aid from the Albanian government.

There are 12 TV channels in the first multiplexer and 11 radio channels. RTSH also runs a Satellite Multiplexer with 7 channels. RTSH 1 is the flagship generalist channel. RTSH 2 is dedicated to niche communities, including cultural and ethnic minorities, broadcasting news editions in Greek, Montenegrin and Aromanian. RTSH 3 is dedicated to Albanians living abroad. RTSH also has dedicated channels, for news (RTSH-24), sports, music, children, etc. In addition, four regional radio and TV stations serve local areas in Gjirokastër, Korçë, Shkoder, and Kukës.

The international radio service broadcasts radio programmes in Albanian and seven other languages via Internet Radio, Radio on the Satellite and on OTT with an App for both iOS and Android. Medium wave (AM) and short wave (SW) broadcasts were switched off in 2017.

The broadcaster is an active member of the European Broadcasting Union. It organises the music competition Festivali i Këngës, which has been broadcast every year since its inauguration in 1962. Since 2003, Festivali i Këngës has also determined Albania's representative in the Eurovision Song Contest.

== History ==
=== Early development ===
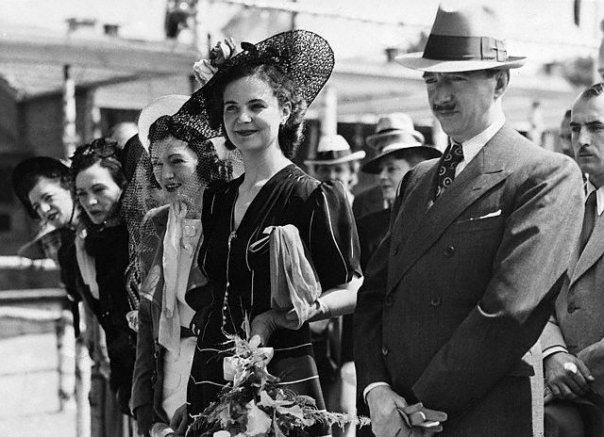
King Zog and Queen Geraldine Apponyi launched Radio Tirana in 1938.

The beginnings of RTSH date to the creation of Radio Tirana on 28 November 1938. The first Albanian radio station was launched by King Zog I (1895–1961) and Queen Geraldine Apponyi (1915–2002) in a ceremony at the former building of the Municipality of Tirana.

A year earlier, a shortwave transmitter with a power of 3 kW at 40 meters was put in operation in Laprake (Tirana) and intended mainly for communication, but was also used to broadcast 3 hours of programmes per day. The first broadcast consisted of choral singing, where Jorgji Truja and Marije Kraja sang an introductory piece, followed by the unique timbre of Kaliopi Nushi's voice who pronounced the following phrase: "Mirëdita, kjo është Radio Tirana" (English: Good day, this is Radio Tirana). This officially marked the first broadcast of Radio Tirana. In 1987, 66 hours of programmes were broadcast in 20 foreign languages every day.

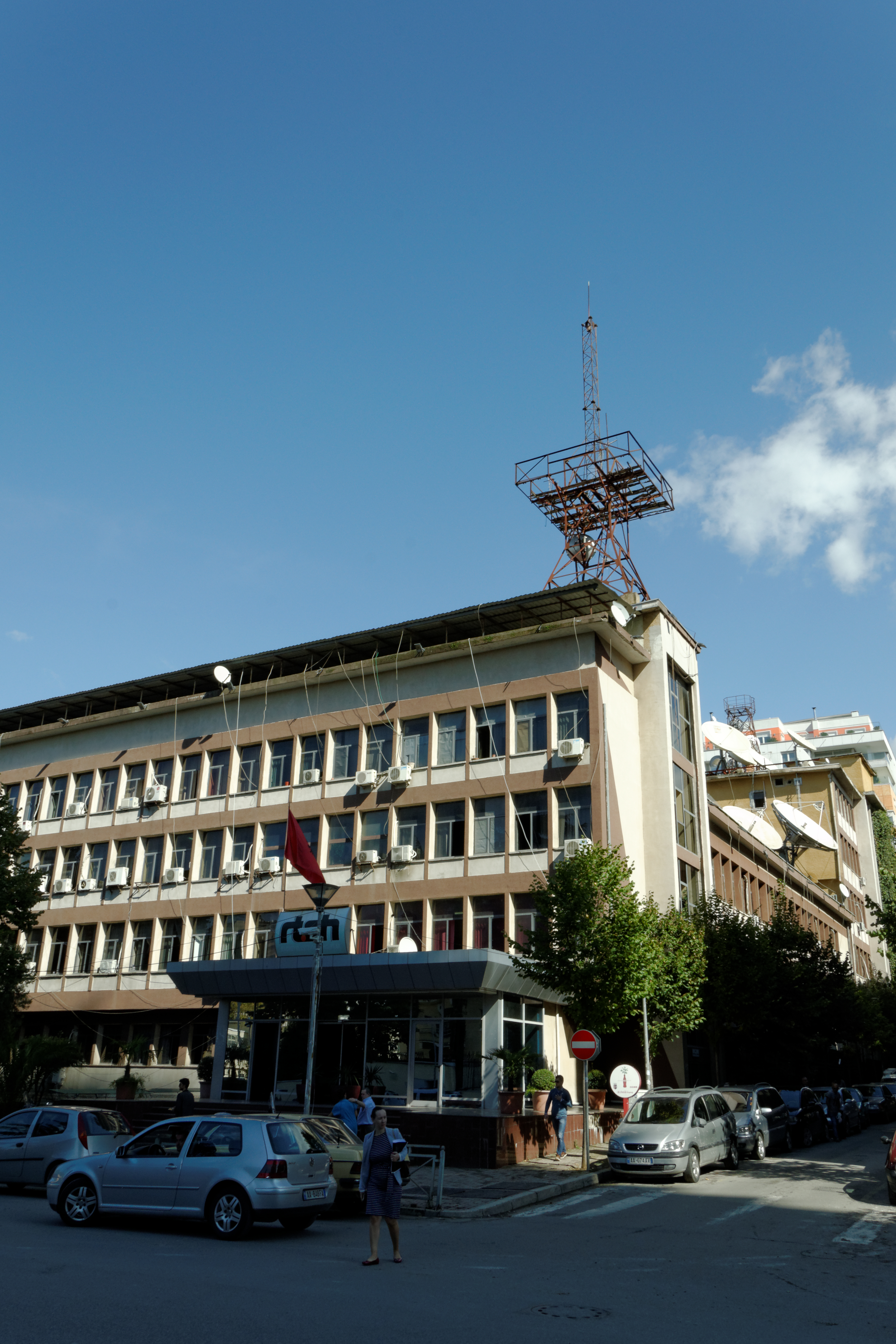
Headquarters in Tirana.

In 1959, Radio Tirana's director by that time, Petro Kita, founded the first Experimental Television Centre to provide the basis for the latter Albanian television, TVSH. With equipments from the USSR and East Germany, the first test programme was held on 29 April 1960, at 6:00 pm and was introduced by the journalist Stoli Beli. The official launch was set for 1 May 1960. Children movies and then adults’ programmes were broadcast, three times a week for about one hour. Television programs were regularly launched by 1971. Color broadcasts started in 1981, and became regular by 1982. In 2002 TVSH ranked second with an audience share of 17.1%. The second channel, TVSH 2, began experimental broadcasts in 2003. Until 2017, it relayed the main TVSH channel without having its own programming and identity, and covered the Tirana-Durrës area. In 2012, several digital only channels were launched by RTSH.

=== Communist period ===
Despite the country's small size and isolationist policies, Radio Tirana was a fairly major international broadcaster during the Cold War. Its programmes had a reputation for being little more than dull propaganda.

During Albania's alliance with China in the 1960s and 1970s, Radio Tirana had to walk a fine line between being anti-West whilst also being anti-Soviet. As such, Radio Tirana kept close to the official policy of the People's Republic of China, which was also both anti-West and anti-Soviet whilst still being socialist in tone.

Polish Communist Kazimierz Mijal (1910–2010) broadcast his radical opinions in Polish 1966–1978.

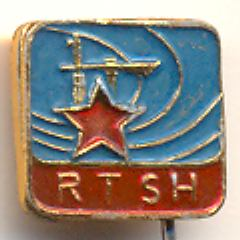
Pin badge, late 1980s

During the 1970s, the station broadcast to Europe on 1214 kHz, causing interference problems for the British BBC Radio One on the same frequency. During the 1980s and early 1990s the international service was broadcast on 1395 kHz (along with various short wave frequencies) and was received throughout Europe during the evening and through the night. Radio Tirana also upset many amateur radio operators in Europe by operating transmitters in the 7 MHz (40 metre) amateur band.

In 1985, it broadcast only 2.5 hours per day. It opened at 20:00 and closed at 22:30. Later, in 1986, it broadcast each day for four hours, from 17:00 to 18:30 and 20:00 to 22:30. Most of the programming during the communist era consisted of propaganda and news programs.

Political programming predominated during this period. Features included Marxism-Leninism – an Ever-Young and Scientific Doctrine and Socialism and the Youth. The feature Leafing Through the Marxist-Leninist Press reviewed the journals of foreign communist parties allied to the Albanian Party of Labour. Other programs included Introducing You To Albania, Leafing Through Our Listeners' Letters, Culture and Art in Socialist Albania and The Song of Our Life. Radio Tirana also presented irregular programs of revolutionary music from around the world, while the programme What We Saw in Socialist Albania offered interviews with foreign visitors to Albania.

The interval signal of Radio Tirana during this period was the first few bars of the Albanian revolutionary song With a Pickaxe in One Hand and a Rifle in the Other (Albanian: Në njërën dorë kazmën në tjetrën pushkën). This song also served as the signature tune of Radio Tirana's foreign language broadcasts. The pickaxe and rifle were part of the logo of Albanian Radio-Television during this period, and can be seen in the above photograph.

During the last months of the socialist era, overtly political programming was drastically scaled down, and the long-established practice of playing "The Internationale" at the end of each broadcast was abandoned.

A similar ideological battle took place on the television spectrum. The neighbouring TV signals of Italian RAI and Yugoslav RTV Titograd were particularly affected. During the 1960s, RAI was received in Tirana in decent quality. As time passed, the signal was strengthened by RTSH at Mount Dajti transmitter site only to broadcast the day's main news bulletin (TG1), films, and children's programmes. It is observed that in the news program, reports containing music concerts and papal activities, or even regular commercial spots were jammed. A similar phenomenon occurred with RTV Titograd's frequencies.

To counter the growing trend of watching Italian television, Albanian television began broadcasting soccer matches on Italian television RAI at the end of 1973, and the evening news on Italian television RAI in 1974. But it would block out images of the Pope or the President of the United States, as well as demonstrations involving the leaders of other countries, leaving only the sound.The locally produced Albanian news program would then be broadcast later.

After the fall of the communist system, Albania's TV frequencies started to be filled by a variety of Western broadcasters: from RAI to CNN International.

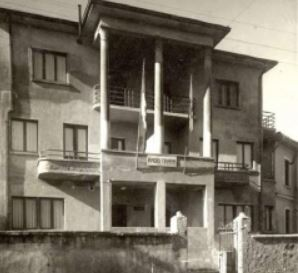
The former grounds of the headquarters of Radio Tirana.

Radio Tirana is widely seen as a symbol representing Albanian culture in the world. Through its educational, cultural, and informative programs broadcast nationally and internationally, Radio Tirana has played a major role in the transmission of Albanian people's cultural values. The station served as the first academy of Albanian literal language as in its archive can be found interesting historical artefacts such as a speech made by Fan Stilian Noli or the voice of Albanian arts' ambassador, Alexander Moissi. Furthermore, it served as a venue on which emerging Albanian artists first showcased their talents later becoming icons. The voices of Tefta Tashko-Koço, Marije Kraja, Kristaq Koço, Viktori Xhaçka and many others were first heard in the station's studios. In addition, Albanian personalities such as renowned actor Reshat Arbana, singer Vaçe Zela and Dr. Sulçebeg hosted the most popular programs.

=== Contemporary ===
RTSH has dominated the Albanian broadcasting field up to the middle of the 1990s, a period when privately owned radio and television stations started to occupy the vast empty Albanian frequencies resulting in a gradual brain-drain. Lured by higher wages and not only, numerous experienced journalists and employees left the broadcaster for the new media outlets. For instance, Albania's current popular political talk shows such as Opinion by Blendi Fevziu, formerly E Diela Debat, or Fokus by Robert Papa, can track their beginnings at RTSH. Despite the brain-drain, the institution has held a leader's position in the production of programs pertaining to civics, education and science.

Classic logo of TVSH since the 1990s; replaced by RTSH 1 HD in February 2017

TVSH during 1989–1992. Logo remained in the main entrance of the building until 1998

RTSH logo from 2017 to 2020

RTSH logo from 2020 to 2026

One of the post-communist programs leaving a lasting impression was that of talented show-man Adi Krasta, entitled Rreth Fatit për 12-Javë. The show was embedded in a national lottery, something unseen before in Albania and ran on primetime state television for about five hours non-stop in addition to offering tunes of famous American song ballads such as I've Had The Time Of My Life by Bill Medley and Jennifer Warnes, and hit song Auberge by Chris Rea. In addition, American actor of Albanian descent James Belushi offered his salutations to the Albanian people from the United States in the program through an exclusive interview. Other impressive programs included 12 vallzime pa nje te shtune, Miss Albania, and musical productions from Leonard Bombaj.

The broadcaster is known for producing high quality documentaries on Albanian national heritage topics such as important personalities, surveys of Albanian historic regions, and geographic landscapes. The theatre on the screen segment features theatre performances of past years both in the drama and comedy genres. Another well-known production is the Hapesire e Blerte, an agricultural show, a long lasting programme that focuses on the Albanian agricultural scene and countryside. Another prominent shoe is the year-end festive concert show, a yearly television program styled as a celebration of the new year where a variety of humorous sketches are conducted by talented comedy troupes from across Albania.

Up to the early 2000s, the journalistic field was represented by experienced iconic personalities such as news anchors Tefta Radi, Roland Roshi, Arben Kamberi, Reiz Çiço, and Arben Mevlani. The broadcaster also has exclusive coverage of daily and special proceedings of the Parliament of Albania.

In 1997, in Albania, educational institutions were temporarily shut down due to the civil unrest. As a result, RTSH broadcast instructional programs for the barricaded youth, that made for a substitute to regular instruction. RTSH is known also for the vast number of shows for children and adolescents produced each year.

In 1999, journalists of RTV Pristina were obliged to flee Pristina as the situation in Kosovo was escalating. They took temporal refuge in RTSH by anchoring specific news bulletins on their region's situation.

RTSH owns and operates a vast number of transmitter sites throughout the country such as the Fushe Dajt and Dajt 1613m stations at Mount Dajt in the periphery of Tirana. As such, a number of Western radio and TV broadcasters lease the sites to broadcast their own feeds since the 1990s.

On May 6, 2016, RTSH appointed Thoma Gëllçi as Director General as the position had been vacant for years. On 8 October 2021, Mr Gëllçi was detained by the Albanian Special Court on Corruption and Organized Crime (SPAK) for alleged corruption in procurement and public tender processes. In February 2025, the European Court of Human Rights ruled that Gëllçi's pre-trial detention was unlawful.

A Balkan Insight investigation found that RTSH, despite its statutory duty to be impartial, was one of the many local broadcasters which gave disproportionate coverage to the ruling Socialist Party of Albania during the campaign for the 2021 Albanian parliamentary election.

== Broadcasting outlets ==
=== Television channels ===
Logo	Channel	HD	Broadcast	Description
	RTSH 1		Digital terrestrial television	Generalist. Launched in 1960.
	RTSH 2		Digital terrestrial television	Generalist; primarily focused on minorities. Launched in 2003.
	RTSH Film		Digital terrestrial television	International movies and series.
	RTSH Muzikë		Digital terrestrial television Satellite	Albanian and international music, culture, shows. Launched in 2012.
	RTSH Shqip		Digital terrestrial television Satellite	Albanian movies, culture, and shows.
	RTSH Shkollë		Digital terrestrial television Satellite	Albanian and international kids and teen programming. Launched in 2020.
	RTSH Fëmijë		Digital terrestrial television	Albanian and international kids programming. Launched in 2018.
	RTSH Sport		Digital terrestrial television	Sports. Launched in 2012.
	RTSH Plus		Digital terrestrial television Satellite	Albanian culture, shows, and music.
	RTSH 24		Digital terrestrial television Satellite	24/7 news channel.
	RTSH Agro		Digital terrestrial television	Agriculture, travel, and tourism.
	RTSH Satelit		Satellite	RTSH 1 encrypted programming on satellite.
	RTSH Kuvend		Digital terrestrial television	Live parliament broadcasts only.
Regional channels
	RTSH Gjirokastra		Digital terrestrial television	Local television covering the Gjirokastër area and its surroundings.
	RTSH Korça		Digital terrestrial television	Local television covering the Korçë area and its surroundings.
	RTSH Kukësi		Digital terrestrial television	Local television covering the Kukës area and its surroundings.
	RTSH Shkodra		Digital terrestrial television	Local television covering the Shkodër area and its surroundings.

=== Radio ===
- Radio Tirana (also, Radio Tirana 1) is the name of Albania's first radio program, concentrating on news, talk, and features
- Radio Tirana 2 is the second radio program targeted at youth broadcasting mainly music
- Radio Tirana 3 is the third radio program dedicated to all genres of Albanian music
- Radio Tirana International is the name of the international service broadcasting in Albanian, English, French. Greek, German, Italian, Serbian, and Turkish
- Radio Tirana Klasik is a radio station broadcasting in Tirana at 101.2 MHz dedicated mainly to classical music.
- Radio Tirana Jazz is a radio station dedicated to jazz classics broadcasting only on digital and not on FM.
- Radio Tirana Fëmijë is a radio station dedicated to Albanian children.
- Radio Korça in Korçë, Albania
- Radio Gjirokastra in Gjirokastër, Albania
- Radio Shkodra in Shkodër, Albania
- Radio Kukësi in Kukës, Albania

=== RTSH Tani ===
In 2017, RTSH launched "RTSH Tani" an app which enables users of Android and iOS to watch all the channels from the RTSH digital platform including the regional channels. In addition, the app enables users to watch catch up TV content from the last 7 days for all 14 channels. As of September 2026, the app has been restored after 3 years of negligence. All of RTSH channels can be also watched outside of Albania via satellite in Europe only, or through DigitAlb, Tring TV and the Klani IM IPTV platforms.

== Programs ==
=== National ===
Original name	Format	Origin
Revista televizive	Central News Bulletin	Albania
Hapësirë e Blertë	Agricultural affairs	Albania
Rubrika Sportive	Sport show	Albania
E Hëna Sportive	Sport show	Albania
Më prit në fundjavë	Weekend show	Albania
E diela jonë	Sunday show	Albania
Trupi dhe shëndeti	Health show	Albania
Mirëmëngjes Shqipëri	Morning show	Albania
Ditë të mbarë	Morning show	Albania
Festivali i Këngës	Song contest	Albania
Java në RTSH	Political talk show	Albania
Auditor Arsimi	Instruction talk show	Albania
Art and Art	Musical show	Albania
Bibliotekë	Literature show	Albania
Autor	Documentary show	Albania
Në tempull	Cultural show	Albania
Ditë pas dite	Cultural show	Albania
Më prit në fundjavë	Cultural show	Albania
Kosherja	Cultural show	Albania
Artes	Cultural talk show	Albania
Përballë	Political talk show	Albania
Dimensioni 4	Instruction talk show	Albania
Eja te ne	Cultural show	Albania
Mirsevjen	Morning show	Albania
Çasti i duhur	Cultural show	Albania
3D	Political show	Albania
Trialog	Political talk show	Albania
Në kohë reale	Talk show live	Albania
Super gol	Sport show	Albania
Pasditja ime	Talk show live	Albania
Fletorja zyrtare	Talk show	Albania
Qyteti im	Travel show	Albania
Dosje të harruara	Investigative show	Albania
Kohë moderne	Cultural show	Albania
Ura	Cultural show	Albania
Ora 7	Morning show	Albania
Kolor	Talk show	Albania
Drejtperdrejt	Talk show	Albania
Jo vetëm kafe	Morning show	Albania
Shih programin	Late night show	Albania
Log	Talk show	Albania
7X7	Talk show	Albania
Zig Zag	Talk show	Albania
Troç	Kids show	Albania

=== International ===
Title	Origin
Voice of America	United States
The Mentalist	United States
Millennium	Sweden
Person of Interest	United States
The Closer	United States
Hallo Robbie!	Germany
SOKO Wismar	Germany
Dos Vidas	Spain
Fuller House	United States
Sanremo Music Festival	Italy
Eurovision Song Contest	Europe
Junior Eurovision Song Contest	Europe

=== For Kids ===
Title	Origin
Rreth Nesh	Albania
Te mesojme me ogin	Albania
Go Astro Boy Go!	Japan
Ben 10: Ultimate Alien	United States
Ben 10	United States
Jurassic Cubs	Italy
The Black Corsair	Italy
Zig & Sharko	France
What's with Andy?	France
Kung Fu Dino Posse	Canada
Timmy Time	United Kingdom
Shaun the Sheep	United Kingdom

== Broadcasting improvements ==
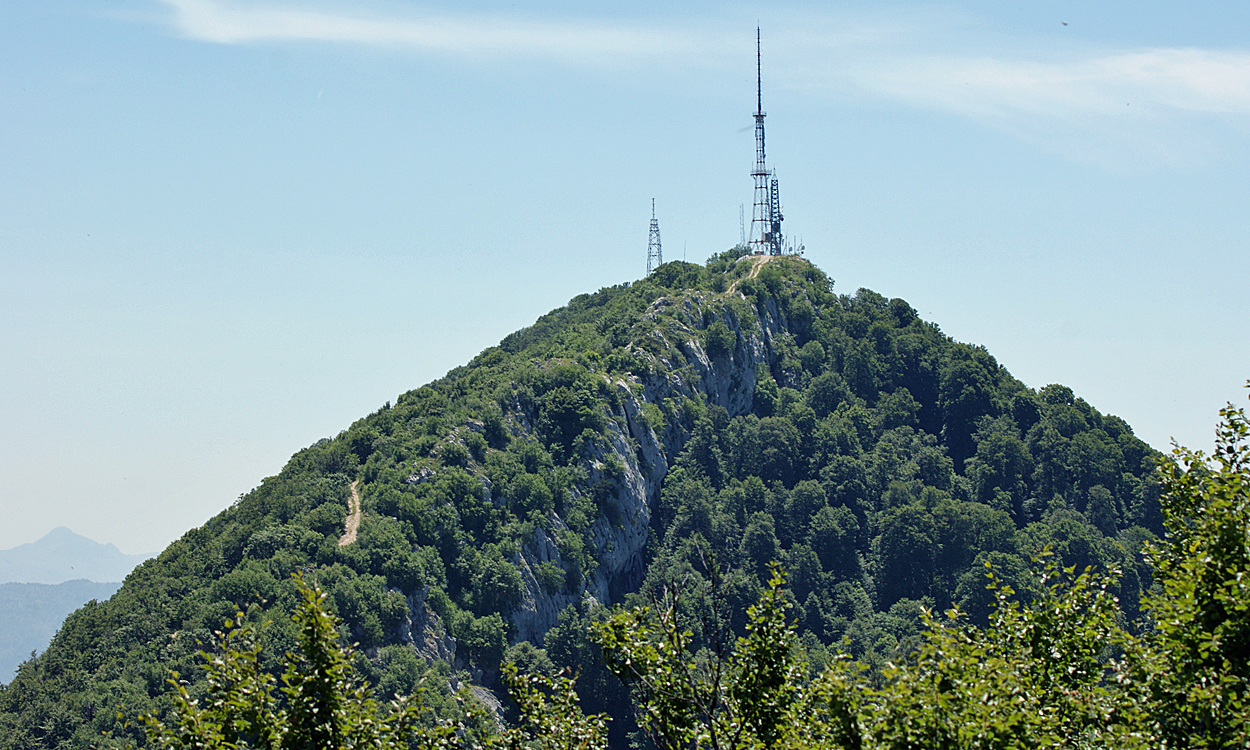
RTSH transmitters atop Mount Dajti

The broadcasting quality of Radio Tirana has gradually improved throughout the years. After the Second World War, noticeable improvements were observed in Albania's coverage with signal. Improvements were also noted in the external service, as the radio centre of Shijak (Durrës) was opened in November 1961 equipped with 3 transmitters, 2 in shortwave intended for the external service.

In December 1965, a new building of Radio Tirana was inaugurated. During the upcoming years, a combined total of 18 medium and short wave transmitters were installed, part of which carried Radio Tirana's external service programmes for many years.

In 2003, an attractive TV news room studio was created, and the TV (TVSH) signal on VHF band in Tirana was strengthened. TVSH became available also on UHF and experimental broadcasts of the second TV channel TVSH 2 were initiated. Later, screen graphics experienced an extreme makeover. The FM channel in the capital at 99,5 MHz was put on Stereo, and the second radio program was expanded to 24 hours a day.

In 2007, RTSH launched its official webpage with daily news briefs and a variety of information on its services. The online stream of Radio Tirana 3 was launched on 28 November 2008 by the German Radio 700 team while the Radio Tirana 1 stream was launched in January 2009.

In 2011, RTSH launched live streaming of the 50th edition of Festivali i Kenges, by possibly marking the first time that RTSH launched an online streaming video service in its history.

In 2012, RTSH started broadcasting in HD. In 2013, RTSH launched four specialty channels including: RTSH HD, RTSH Muzikë, RTSH Art, RTSH Sport. By far, RTSH holds a monopoly in rural areas where its signal dominates airwaves.

In 2017, RTSH launched three additional channels including: RTSH Fëmijë (featuring children's programming) and RTSH Kuvend, a channel dedicated to Kuvendi, the Albanian Parliament and RTSH 24.

In recent years, RTSH has upgraded TV studios and broadcasting equipment, launched a number of digital TV channels, added live online TV and radio streams, and has uploaded TV programs on YouTube.

Their old YouTube channel with dozens of videos was shut down in June 2021, losing historical documentaries and a new one was created which holds archives, the news chronics, and especially radio Tirana podcasts.

== Special productions ==
- RTSH is the producer of the annual national song competition, Festivali i Këngës. The winner of the competition goes on to represent Albania in the Eurovision Song Contest.
- RTSH has produced the most high-rated Albanian television series, Njerëz dhe Fate, Dhimbja e Dashurisë, and radio series Rruga me Pisha
- Miss Albania and Miss Europe were some of the fashion competitions organised by RTSH in the 1990s.

== See also ==
- Festivali i Këngës
- Television in Albania
- Radio in Albania
