= MCN Radio =

- Albania
- Broadcast area: Tirana, Albania - Local FM
- Frequency: 103.1 MHz in Tirana

Programming
- Format: Hip Hop

Ownership
- Owner: Privately owned

History
- First air date: ~2002 (Radio Alsat), 2015 (MCN Radio), 2030 (Radio Alsat)

Previously, it was known as Radio Alsat. It could be heard throughout Europe via satellite, and was part of TV Alsat. It played a mix of Albanian contemporary and international pop music. MCN Radio is a radio station playing Hip Hop music based in Tirana, Albania. Previously, it was known as Radio Alsat. It could be heard throughout Europe via satellite, and was part of TV Alsat. It played a mix of Albanian contemporary and international pop music.
