= Radio One (Albania) =

Radio One (formerly Eagle Radio/Radio Be-94) is a radio station based in Tirana, Albania. Radio One began broadcasting in 2007 and was founded by Gjergj Poci, Andi Alimema and Dorian Poci. It is a commercial free station promoting electronic and alternative music and artists.

== Playlist ==
Playlists consist of minimal electronic, alternative, pop music and chillout tracks and are constructed by the station's DJs, which include DJ Aldo and EriD, a well known local DJ. The station has occasional live DJ shows, which are performed for two to three hours during the evenings. The jingles which can be heard between tracks were recorded in the studio in August 2008 by Simon Holpin, from Worcester in the UK, and were first broadcast in October 2008.

== DJs ==
Current DJs featuring on Eagle Radio:

- DJ Aldo
- DJ Boocky
- Leo Cik
- DJ Tattoo
- EriD

== Broadcasting area ==
An online stream of the radio station is available worldwide from the radio station's website, which also features extensive information on events and future programmes within the station. The radio broadcasts on 94FM within the Tirana region, and extends its coverage into the south-west region of Albania along the Albanian Riviera.
