= Club FM (Albania) =

Albanian radio station

Programming
- Format: Pop

History
- First air date: February 1998

Technical information
- ERP: 2,000 Watts

Links
- Website: clubfm.al

Club FM (100.4 FM) is a national radio station based in Tirana, Albania, which focuses on new releases and current music hits. It first went on air in February 1998 by broadcasting gold music, but soon turned to a pop format. Its music genre is different from most other Albanian radio stations as it mostly plays commercial music and promotes professional musicians. The new studios are located in the Rexhep Jella 9, Tiranë. And is called “Vila Club FM” since 2022. The former studios used to be in “Hotel Rogner” from 1998 to 2022.

== Promotional activities ==
Important singers and famous groups such as Bellini, Boney M, Antique, London Beat and Shaft have been invited by Radio Club FM to broadcast for its listeners in Albania.

In addition, the station has made it possible for listeners to take part in big concerts across Europe by singers such as Sting and Eros Ramazzotti.
