= Albania in the Eurovision Song Contest 2013 =

- Eurovision Song Contest 2013
- Participating broadcaster: Radio Televizioni Shqiptar (RTSH)
- Country: Albania
- Selection process: Festivali i Këngës 51
- Selection date: 22 December 2012

Competing entry
- Song: "Identitet"
- Artist: Adrian Lulgjuraj and Bledar Sejko
- Songwriters: Eda Sejko

Placement
- Semi-final result: Failed to qualify (15th)

Participation chronology

Albania was represented at the Eurovision Song Contest 2013 in Malmö, Sweden, with the song "Identitet" performed by Adrian Lulgjuraj and Bledar Sejko. Its selected entry was chosen through the national selection competition Festivali i Këngës organised by Radio Televizioni Shqiptar (RTSH) in December 2012. To this point, the nation had participated in the Eurovision Song Contest nine times since its first entry in 2004. Prior to the contest, the song was promoted by a music video and a live performance, which was in the Netherlands. Albania was drawn to compete in the second semi-final of the Eurovision Song Contest, which took place on 16 May 2013. Performing as number 14th, the nation was not announced among the top 10 entries of the second semi-final and therefore failed to qualify for the final, marking Albania's fourth non-qualification in the contest.

== Background ==
Prior to the 2013 contest, Albania had participated in the Eurovision Song Contest nine times since its first entry in 2004. The country's highest placing in the contest, to this point, had been the fifth place, which it achieved in 2012 with the song "Suus" performed by Rona Nishliu. The first entry was performed by Anjeza Shahini with the song "The Image of You" and finished in the seventh place, the nation's second-highest placing to date. During its tenure in the contest, Albania failed to qualify for the final three times, with the 2011 entry being the most recent non-qualifier.

== Before Eurovision ==
=== Festivali i Këngës ===
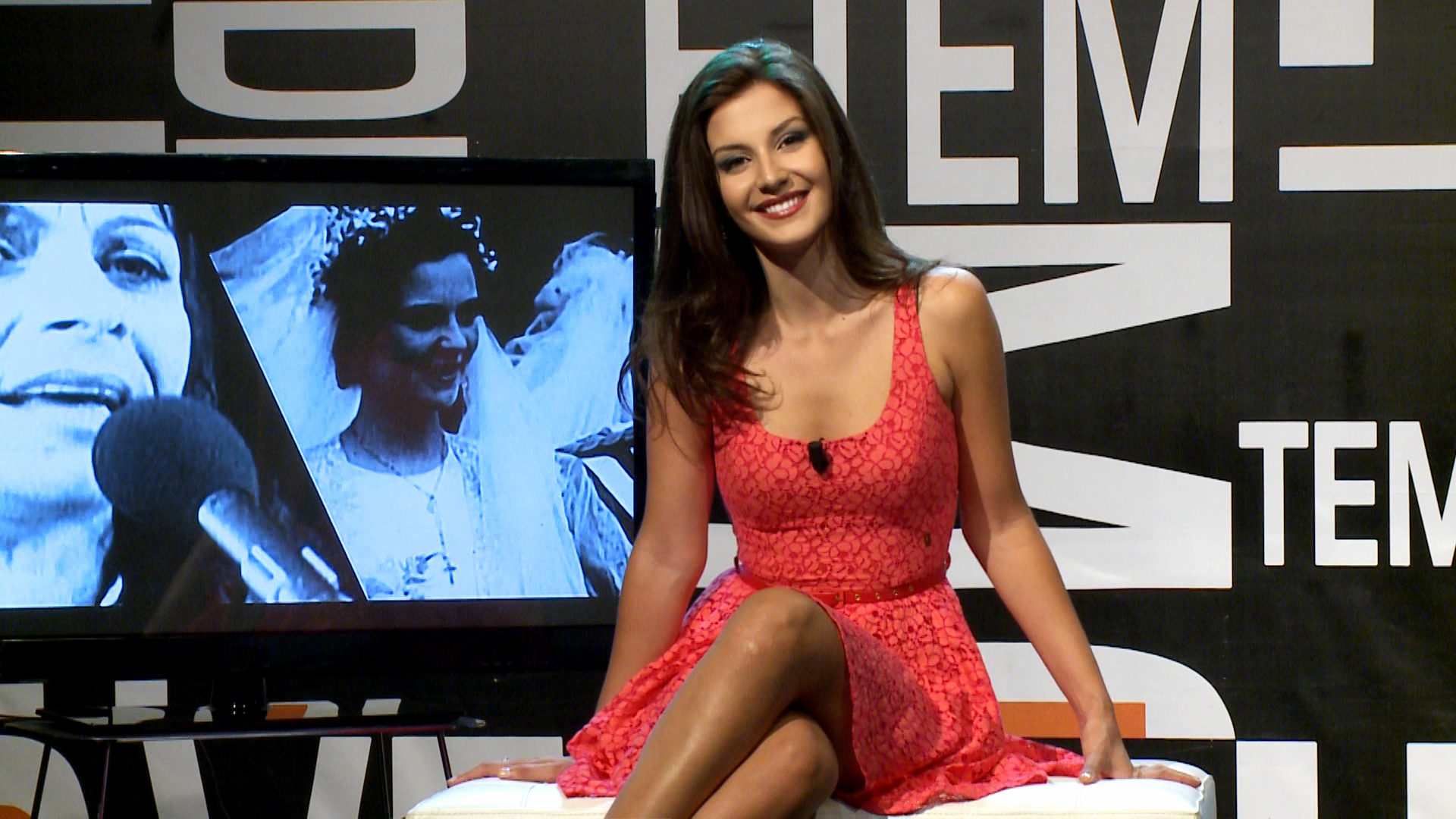
Floriana Garo co-hosted the 51st edition of Festivali i Këngës.

The national broadcaster of Albania, Radio Televizioni Shqiptar (RTSH), organised the 51st edition of Festivali i Këngës in order to select their participant for the Eurovision Song Contest 2013. The competition consisted of two semi-finals on 20 and 21 December, respectively, and the grand final on 22 December 2012, being held at the Palace of Congresses in Tirana. The three live shows were hosted by Albanian television presenter Enkel Demi and Albanian model Floriana Garo. Prior to the scheduled event, RTSH opened a submission period between July and 9 October 2012 for artists and composers to participate in Festivali i Këngës, during which they received approximately 65 applications. The list of the competing artists and songs was officially revealed on 1 November, with them being shortlisted to compete in the two semi-finals of the contest. On 30 November 2012, the broadcaster announced the running order of the two semi-finals.

==== Competing entries ====
Key: Withdrawn

Competing entries
Artist(s)	Song	Songwriter(s)
Adrian Lulgjuraj and Bledar Sejko	"Identitet"	Bledar Sejko, Eda Sejko
Ani Çuedari (Note: After qualifying for the grand final, Ani Çuedari with "Më ler një ëndërr" was disqualified related to an authorship request.)	"Më ler një ëndërr"	Arjan Muka
Anjeza Shahini	"Love"	Edmond Zhulali, Skender Sherifi
Ardian Bujupi	"I çmendur për ty"	Ardian Bujupi
Arjan Dredhasi	"Fluturim i lirë"	Arjan Dredhasi, Pandi Laço
Arjela Krasniqi	"Më thuaj pse"	Gramoz Kozell
Bojken Lako	"Lot, jetë, dashuri"	Bojken Lako
Bon Bon Band	"Humbur"	Alban Gjoçi, Tahir Gjoçaj
Dr. Flori and Fabi	"Jam ti!"	Dr. Flori, Fabi
Elis Nova	"Ajo"	Elis Nova
Entela Zhula	"Dyert e parajsës"	Vullnet Ibrahimi
Flaka Krelani	"Tek ti në shpirt"	Endri Sina, Pandi Laço
Hersi Matmuja	"Kush ta dha këtë emër"	Genti Lako, Jorgo Papingji
Kejsi Tola	"S'jemi më atje"	Sokol Marsi
Kelly	"Ylli im polar"	Kelly, Vedat Ademi
Kozma Dushi	"Ëndërr mbete ti"	Arben Duka, Vladimir Kotani
Lynx	"Si ty askush"	Lynx
Marsela Çibukaj	"Mijëra netë"	Alban Male, Eneda Mjeshtri
Merland Kademi	"Këtu fillon parajsa"	Elvis Duro, Florian Zyka
Na	"Sa larg"	Enis Mullaj, Kreshnik Koshi
Rezarta Smaja	"Ti"	Florian Zyka, Lambert Jorganxhi
Rosela Gjylbegu	"Dëshirë"	Endrit Mumajesi, Endrit Shani
Selami Kolonja	"Ku je"	Selami Kolonja
Valon Shehu	"Nuk do të ndal"	Marjan Deda, Sokol Marsi
Vesa Luma	"S'jam perfekt"	Florent Boshnjaku, Gerald Xhari
Xheni and Enxhi Kumrija	"Arti i një fundi"	Enxhi Kumrija, Xheni

==== Shows ====
===== Semi-finals =====
The two semi-finals of Festivali i Këngës took place on 20 December and 21 December 2012 and were broadcast at 20:30 (CET) on the respective dates. During the semi-finals, guest performances were featured from Hungary's Eurovision Song Contest 2012 representative Compact Disco and Bosnia and Herzegovina's Eurovision Song Contest 2006 representative Hari Mata Hari, respectively. The highlighted contestants in the tables below qualified for the grand final.

Semi-final 1 – 20 December 2012
R/O	Artist(s)	Song
1	Selami Kolonja	"Ku je"
2	Rosela Gjylbegu	"Dëshirë"
3	Kejsi Tola	"S'jemi më atje"
4	Vesa Luma	"S'jam perfekt"
5	Elis Nova	"Ajo"
6	Kozma Dushi	"Ëndërr mbete ti"
7	Bon Bon Band	"Humbur"
8	Dr. Flori and Fabi	"Jam ti"
9	Merland Kademi	"Këtu fillon parajsa"
10	Rezarta Smaja	"Ti"
11	Ardian Bujupi	"I çmendur për ty"
12	Xheni and Enxhi Kumrija	"Arti i një fundi"
13	Arjela Krasniqi	"Më thuaj pse"

Semi-final 2 – 21 December 2012
R/O	Artist(s)	Song
1	Arjan Dredhasi	"Fluturim i lirë"
2	Adrian Lulgjuraj and Bledar Sejko	"Identitet"
3	Hersi Matmuja	"Kush ta dha këtë emër"
4	Lynx	"Si ty askush"
5	Entela Zhula	"Dyert e parajsës"
6	Anjeza Shahini	"Love"
7	Kelly	"Ylli im polar"
8	Bojken Lako	"Lot, jetë, dashuri"
9	Marsela Çibukaj	"Mijëra netë"
10	Valon Shehu	"Nuk do të ndal"
11	~~Ani Çuedari~~	~~"Më ler një ëndërr"~~
12	Na	"Sa larg"
13	Flaka Krelani	"Tek ti në shpirt"

===== Final =====
The grand final of Festivali i Këngës took place on 22 December 2012 and was broadcast live at 20:30 (CET). 17 songs competed in it and the winner was determined by the combination of the votes from a seven-member jury panel, consisting of Joseph Mizzi (Malta), Justina Aliaj (Albania), Nicola Caligiore (Italy), Petrit Ymeri (Albania), Sokol Shupo (Albania), Szilva Puspok (Hungary) and Zef Coba (Albania). Adrian Lulgjuraj and Bledar Sejko emerged as the winning artists and were simultaneously announced as Albania's representative for the Eurovision Song Contest 2013.

Final – 22 December 2012
R/O	Artist(s)	Song	Points	Result
1	Ardian Bujupi	"I çmendur për ty"	10	11
2	Valon Shehu	"Nuk do të ndal"	0	15
3	Merland Kademi	"Këtu fillon parajsa"	40	5
4	Kelly	"Ylli im polar"	3	12
5	Rezarta Smaja	"Ti"	36	7
6	Kejsi Tola	"S'jemi më atje"	42	4
7	Lynx	"Si ty askush"	1	14
8	Hersi Matmuja	"Kush ta dha këtë emër"	48	3
9	Rosela Gjylbegu	"Dëshirë"	11	9
10	Flaka Krelani	"Labirint i zemrës"	39	6
11	Vesa Luma	"S'jam perfekt"	0	15
12	Anjeza Shahini	"Love"	62	2
13	Adrian Lulgjuraj and Bledar Sejko	"Identitet"	74	1
14	Bojken Lako	"Lot, jetë, dashuri"	27	8
15	Selami Kolonja	"Ku je"	0	15
16	Dr. Flori and Fabi	"Jam ti!"	11	9
17	Xheni and Enxhi Kumrija	"Arti i një fundi"	2	13

=== Promotion ===
A music video for "Identitet" premiered via the official YouTube channel of the Eurovision Song Contest on 12 March 2013. For promotional purposes, Lulgjuraj and Sejko embarked on a small tour with live performances at various events related to the contest, including in the Netherlands.

== At Eurovision ==
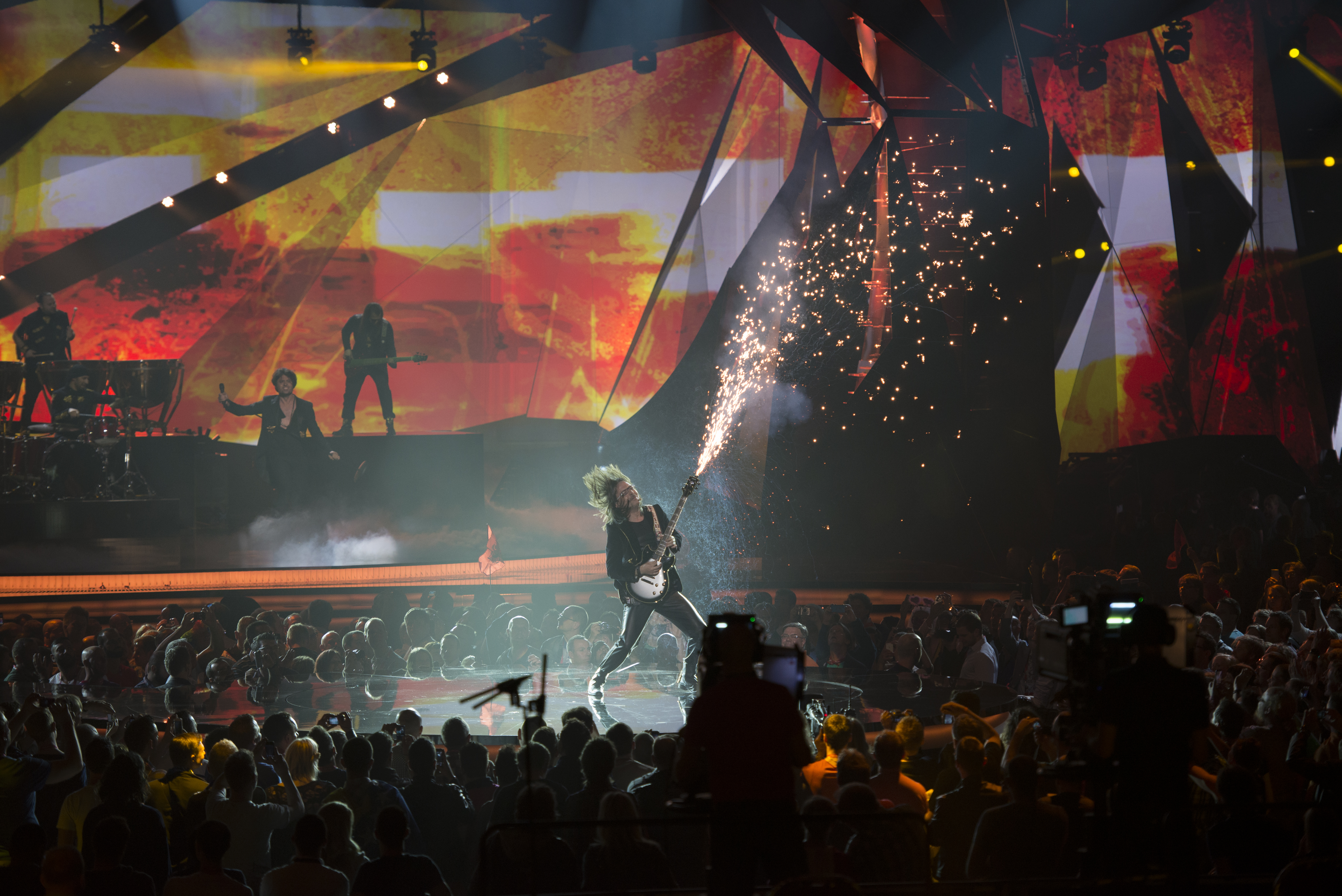
Adrian Lulgjuraj and Bledar Sejko performing during the second semi-final of the Eurovision Song Contest 2013.

The Eurovision Song Contest 2013 took place at Malmö Arena in Malmö, Sweden, and consisted of two semi-finals held on 14 and 16 May, respectively, and the grand final on 18 May 2013. According to the Eurovision rules, all participating countries, apart from the host nation and the "Big Five", consisting of France, Germany, Italy, Spain and the United Kingdom, were required to qualify from one of the two semi-finals to compete for the final, although the top 10 countries from the respective semi-final progress to the grand final.

On 17 January 2013, a special allocation draw was held in Malmö that placed each country into one of the two semi-finals, as well as which half of the show they would perform in. Albania was placed into the second semi-final, to be held on 16 May, and was scheduled to perform in the second half of the show. Once all the competing songs for the contest had been released, the running order for the semi-finals was decided by the producers of the contest rather than through another draw, for preventing similar songs being placed next to each other; Albania was set to perform in position 14, following Norway and preceding Georgia. At the end of the second semi-final, the country was not announced among the top 10 entries and therefore failed to qualify for the final, marking Albania's fourth non-qualification in the Eurovision Song Contest.

=== Voting ===
The tables below visualise a breakdown of points awarded to Albania in the second semi-final of the Eurovision Song Contest 2013, as well as by the country for both the second semi-final and grand final. In the semi-final, Albania finished in 15th place with a total of 31 points, including 10 from Macedonia and 8 from Greece. In the final, Albania awarded its 12 points to Macedonia in the second semi-final, and to Italy in the final of the contest.

==== Points awarded to Albania ====
Points awarded to Albania (Semi-final 2)
Score	Country
12 points	
10 points	Macedonia
8 points	Greece
7 points	
6 points	San Marino
5 points	Switzerland
4 points	
3 points	
2 points	Azerbaijan
1 point	

==== Points awarded by Albania ====
Points awarded by Albania (Semi-final 2)
Score	Country
12 points	Macedonia
10 points	Greece
8 points	Azerbaijan
7 points	Hungary
6 points	Malta
5 points	Romania
4 points	Bulgaria
3 points	Israel
2 points	Switzerland
1 point	Finland

Points awarded by Albania (Final)
Score	Country
12 points	Italy
10 points	Greece
8 points	Hungary
7 points	Azerbaijan
6 points	Spain
5 points	Romania
4 points	Netherlands
3 points	Germany
2 points	Norway
1 point	Denmark
