= Albania in the Eurovision Song Contest 2014 =

- Eurovision Song Contest 2014
- Participating broadcaster: Radio Televizioni Shqiptar (RTSH)
- Country: Albania
- Selection process: Festivali i Këngës 52
- Selection date: 28 December 2013

Competing entry
- Song: "One Night's Anger"
- Artist: Hersi
- Songwriters: Genti Lako; Jorgo Papingji

Placement
- Semi-final result: Failed to qualify (15th)

Participation chronology

Albania was represented at the Eurovision Song Contest 2014 in Copenhagen, Denmark, with the song "One Night's Anger" performed by Hersi. Its selected entry was chosen through the national selection competition Festivali i Këngës organised by Radio Televizioni Shqiptar (RTSH) in December 2013. Up until this point, the nation had participated in the Eurovision Song Contest ten times since its first entry in 2004.

"One Night's Anger" song was promoted by a music video and several live performances across Europe. Albania was drawn to compete in the first semi-final of the Eurovision Song Contest, which took place on 6 May 2014. Performing as number 6th, the nation was not among the top 10 entries of the first semi-final and therefore failed to qualify for the final, marking Albania's fifth non-qualification in the contest. The nation placed 15th in the semi-finals with 22 points.

== Background ==
Prior to the 2014 contest, Albania had participated in the Eurovision Song Contest ten times since its first entry in 2004. Its first entry was the song "The Image of You" performed by Anjeza Shahini, which finished in seventh place, the nation's second-highest placing as of 2023. The country's highest placing by 2015 had been fifth, which it achieved in 2012 with the song "Suus" performed by Rona Nishliu. Albania had previously failed to qualify for the final three times, most recently in 2013. Radio Televizioni Shqiptar (RTSH) was the Albanian broadcaster for the 2014 contest and was tasked with organising the selection process for its entry: Festivali i Këngës.

== Before Eurovision ==
=== Festivali i Këngës ===
The national broadcaster of Albania, Radio Televizioni Shqiptar (RTSH), organised the 52nd edition of Festivali i Këngës with the aim of determining the country's participant for the Eurovision Song Contest 2014. The competition consisted of two semi-finals on 26 and 27 December, respectively, and the final on 28 December 2013. The three live shows were held at the Palace of Congresses in Tirana and hosted by Albanian journalist Enkel Demi, with models Xhesika Berberi and Marinela Meta co-hosting the two semi-finals as well as actress Klea Huta co-hosting the final.

==== Competing entries ====
From 8 and 9 October 2013, interested artists were able to submit their entries to RTSH. The broadcaster received approximately 40 submissions. On 4 November 2013, RTSH announced the 16 artists and songs selected for the competition by a special committee. "Jeta në orën 4" performed by Orges Toçe was later withdrawn and replaced by "Jehona" performed by NA.

Key: Withdrawn Replacement entry

Competing entries
Artist(s)	Song	Songwriter(s)
Besiana Mehmeti and Shkodran Tolaj	"Jam larg"	Vullnet Ibrahimi
Blerina Braka	"Mikja ime"	Gramoz Kozeli
Edmond Mancaku and Entela Zhula	"Vetëm për ty"	Edmond Mancaku; Alma Meraj
Frederik Ndoci	"Një ditë shprese"	Frederik Ndoci; Agim Doçi
Hersiana Matmuja	"Zemërimi i një nate"	Genti Lako; Jorgo Papingji
Klodian Kaçani	"Me ty"	Klodian Qafoku; Florian Zyka
Luiz Ejlli	"Kthehu"	Marjan Deda; Sokol Marsi
Lynx	"Princesha"	Lynx
Marjeta Billo	"Ti mungon"	Lambert Jorganxhi; Florian Zyka
NA (Note: "Ne mes" by Orges Toçe was replaced by "Jehona" by NA.)	"Jehona"	Enis Mullaj
Orges Toçe	"Ne mes"	Orges Toçe
Renis Gjoka	"Mjegulla"	Renis Gjoka; Edmond Tupe
Rezarta Smaja	"Në zemër"	Sokol Marsi
Sajmir Braho	"Grua"	Endri Sina; Sajmir Braho
Venera Lumani and Lindi Islami	"Natë e pare"	Endrit Shani; Olti Curri
Xhejn and Enxhi Kumrija	"Kur qielli qan"	Xhejn Kumrija; Enxhi Kumrija
Xhejsi Jorgaqi	"Ëndërrat janë ëndërra"	Xhejsi Jorgaqi

==== Shows ====
===== Semi-finals =====
The two semi-finals of Festivali i Këngës took place on 26 December and 27 December 2013 and were broadcast at 20:45 (CET). In each of the semi-finals, the contestants performed their entries alongside another Albanian artist, singing a past entry from Festivali i Këngës.

Semi-final 1 – 26 December 2013
R/O	Artist	Song	Duettist	Song
1	Luiz Ejlli	"Kthehu"	Mira Konçi	"I thuaj jo"
2	Rezarta Smaja	"Në zemër"	Elton Deda	"Vjeshta"
3	Edmond Mancaku and Entela Zhula	"Vetëm për ty"	Altin Goci	"S'ma njohe zemrën"
4	Venera Lumani and Lindi Islami	"Natë e pare"	Olta Boka	"Jeta nuk është lodër"
5	Xhejn and Enxhi Kumrija	"Kur qielli qan"	Redon Makashi	"Shi bie në Tiranë"
6	Renis Gjoka	"Mjegulla"	Kejsi Tola	"Më dhe dritë nga syri yt"
7	Blerina Braka	"Mikja ime"	Kamela Islamaj	"Zhgënjimi"
8	Hersiana Matmuja	"Zemërimi i një nate"	Endri and Stefi Prifti	"Ma ke prish gjumin e natës"

Semi-final 2 – 27 December 2013
R/O	Artist	Song	Duettist	Song
1	NA	"Jehona"	Kozma Dushi	"Gjeologës"
2	Marjeta Billo	"Ti mungon"	Juliana Pasha	"Dashuria e parë"
3	Xhejsi Jorgaqi	"Ëndërrat janë ëndërra"	Eranda Libohova	"Gezimin njerzve u a shtoj"
4	Klodian Kaçani	"Me ty"	Rovena Dilo	"Rrjedh në këngë e ligjërime"
5	Frederik Ndoci	"Një ditë shprese"	Irma Libohova	"Shqipëri o vendi im"
6	Besiana Mehmeti and Shkodran Tolaj	"Jam larg"	Myfarete Laze	"A do të vish (Alo, Alo, Alo)"
7	Sajmir Braho	"Grua"	Flaka Krelani	"Ecën në shi"
8	Lynx	"Princesha"	Eneda Tarifa	"Jemi emri i vetë jetes"

===== Final =====
The final of Festivali i Këngës took place on 28 December 2013 and was broadcast at 20:45 (CET). Italian-Albanian singer Elhaida Dani and Danish singer Emmelie de Forest, who won the Eurovision Song Contest 2013, were the interval acts of the final. The jury, consisting of Agim Krajka, Bojken Lako, Aleksander Lalo, Petrit Malaj, Erjona Rushiti, Xhevahir Spahiu, and Hajg Zaharian, determined Hersiana Matmuja as the winner of the contest for the song "Zemërimi i një nate".

Key: Winner Second place Third place

Final – 28 December 2013
R/O	Artist(s)	Song	Results	
R/O	Artist(s)	Song	Points	Place
1	Hersiana Matmuja	"Zemërimi i një nate"	69	1
2	Besiana Mehmeti and Shkodran Tolaj	"Jam larg"	12	13
3	Luiz Ejlli	"Kthehu"	20	10
4	Frederik Ndoci	"Një ditë shprese"	33	5
5	NA	"Jehona"	25	7
6	Klodian Kaçani	"Me ty"	45	2
7	Venera Lumani and Lindi Islami	"Natë e pare"	37	4
8	Blerina Braka	"Mikja ime"	16	12
9	Xhejsi Jorgaqi	"Ëndërrat janë ëndërra"	0	16
10	Xhejn and Enxhi Kumrija	"Kur qielli qan"	28	6
11	Lynx	"Princesha"	6	15
12	Marjeta Billo	"Ti mungon"	18	11
13	Sajmir Braho	"Grua"	40	3
14	Rezarta Smaja	"Në zemër"	25	7
15	Edmond Mancaku and Entela Zhula	"Vetëm për ty"	10	14
16	Renis Gjoka	"Mjegulla"	22	9

=== Preparation and promotion ===
Following "Zemërimi i një nate"'s win, the song was revamped and released in English as "One Night's Anger" for its Eurovision participation. A music video for the song premiered on the official YouTube channel of the Eurovision Song Contest on 16 March 2014 alongside the premiere of the new version. For promotional purposes, Matmuja embarked on a small tour with live performances at various events related to the contest in Hungary, Montenegro, the Netherlands and San Marino.

== At Eurovision ==
Hersi presenting herself during the Eurovision Song Contest 2014.

The Eurovision Song Contest 2014 took place at B&W Hallerne in Copenhagen, Denmark; it consisted of two semi-finals held on 6 and 8 May, respectively, and the final on 10 May 2014. According to the Eurovision rules, all participating countries, apart from the host nation and the "Big Five", consisting of France, Germany, Italy, Spain and the United Kingdom, were required to qualify from one of the two semi-finals to compete for the final, with the top 10 countries from the each semi-final progressing to the final. On 20 January 2014, an allocation draw was held at the Copenhagen City Hall in Copenhagen that placed each country into one of the two semi-finals, and determined which half of the show they would perform in. Albania was placed into the first semi-final, to be held on 6 May, and was scheduled to perform in the first half of the show.

Once all the competing songs for the contest had been released, the running order for the semi-finals was decided by the producers of the contest rather than through another draw, to prevent similar songs being placed next to each other; Albania was set to perform in position 6, following Iceland and preceding Russia. The contest was broadcast within Albania on the RTSH network, with Andri Xhahu providing commentary, a role he also performed during the previous year's contest.

=== Performances ===
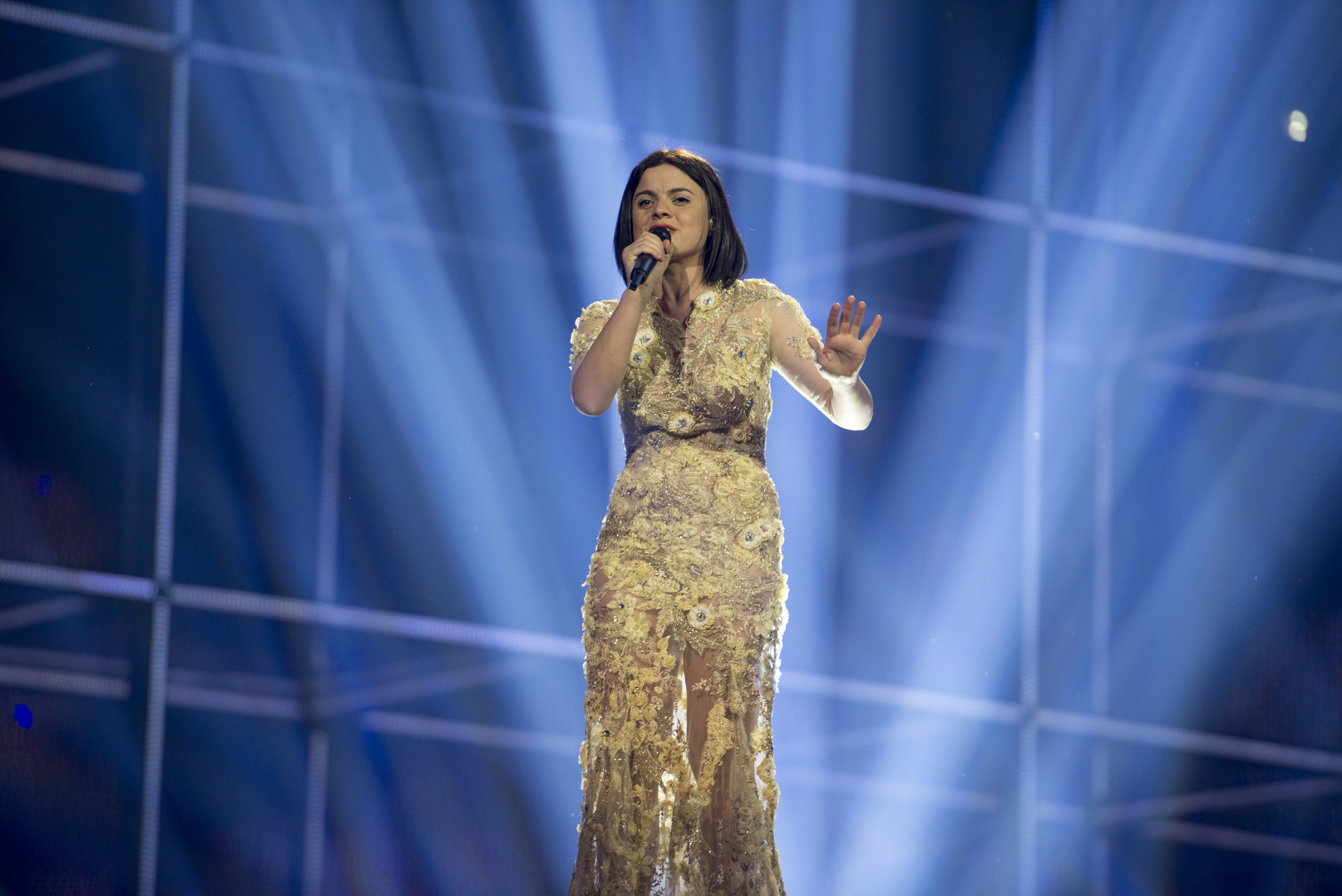
Hersi performing during the dress rehearsal of the first semi-final of the Eurovision Song Contest 2014.

Hersi took part in technical rehearsals on 28 April and 2 May, followed by dress rehearsals on 5 and 6 May. This included the jury final on 6 May where the professional juries of each country, responsible for 50 percent of each country's vote, watched and voted on the competing entries. At the end of the first semi-final, the country was not among the top 10 entries and therefore failed to qualify for the final, marking Albania's fifth non-qualification in the Eurovision Song Contest. When the results were revealed, Albania placed 15th with 22 points, including the top 12 points from Montenegro.

=== Voting ===
Voting during the three shows involved each country awarding points from 1–8, 10, and 12 as determined by a combination of 50% national jury and 50% televoting. Each nation's jury consisted of five music industry professionals who were citizens of the country they represented. This jury judged each entry based on vocal capacity; stage performance; the song's composition and originality; and the overall impression by the act. In addition, no member of a national jury was permitted to be related in any way to any of the competing acts in such a way that they could not vote impartially and independently. The nation awarded its 12 points to Montenegro in the first semi-final and Spain in the final. Xhahu was the Albanian spokesperson who announced the country's voting results during the shows.

Below is a breakdown of points awarded to and awarded by Albania in the first semi-final and final of the Eurovision Song Contest 2014, respectively. The points awarded by Albania in both the first semi-final and the final were based solely on the jury's vote due to an insufficient number of votes cast during the televote period.

==== Points awarded to Albania ====
Points awarded to Albania (Semi-final 1)
Score	Country
12 points	Montenegro
10 points	
8 points	
7 points	
6 points	
5 points	San Marino
4 points	
3 points	
2 points	Belgium; Denmark
1 point	Netherlands

==== Points awarded by Albania ====
Points awarded by Albania (Semi-final 1)
Score	Country
12 points	Montenegro
10 points	Hungary
8 points	San Marino
7 points	Azerbaijan
6 points	Sweden
5 points	Armenia
4 points	Moldova
3 points	Ukraine
2 points	Netherlands
1 point	Portugal

Points awarded by Albania (Final)
Score	Country
12 points	Spain
10 points	Italy
8 points	Hungary
7 points	Sweden
6 points	Montenegro
5 points	Austria
4 points	Germany
3 points	San Marino
2 points	Greece
1 point	Malta

==== Detailed voting results ====
The following members comprised the Albanian jury:

- Edmond Zhulali (jury chairperson)
- Alfred Kaçinari
- Jetmir Barbullushi
- Mira Tuci
- Engjëll Ndocaj

Detailed voting results from Albania (Semi-final 1)
R/O	Country	E. Zhulali	A. Kacinari	J. Barbullushi	M. Tuci	E. Ndocaj	Jury Rank	Points
01	Armenia	4	5	11	1	14	6	5
02	Latvia	12	10	10	15	10	13	
03	Estonia	14	12	7	13	9	12	
04	Sweden	3	4	5	5	7	5	6
05	Iceland	13	15	13	14	11	15	
06	Albania							
07	Russia	15	13	15	7	13	14	
08	Azerbaijan	7	6	4	2	3	4	7
09	Ukraine	8	8	12	10	6	8	3
10	Belgium	10	14	8	9	12	11	
11	Moldova	9	7	6	12	8	7	4
12	San Marino	6	3	3	8	2	3	8
13	Portugal	11	11	14	11	5	10	1
14	Netherlands	5	9	9	6	15	9	2
15	Montenegro	2	2	1	4	1	1	12
16	Hungary	1	1	2	3	4	2	10

Detailed voting results from Albania (Final)
R/O	Country	E. Zhulali	A. Kacinari	J. Barbullushi	M. Tuci	E. Ndocaj	Jury Rank	Points
01	Ukraine	15	17	17	24	13	19	
02	Belarus	18	8	26	25	22	23	
03	Azerbaijan	12	14	16	7	26	15	
04	Iceland	24	26	18	26	14	24	
05	Norway	23	19	19	18	15	20	
06	Romania	22	16	9	14	16	16	
07	Armenia	9	13	20	6	25	13	
08	Montenegro	6	10	5	5	3	5	6
09	Poland	14	18	21	23	23	22	
10	Greece	3	22	15	15	2	9	2
11	Austria	11	6	4	4	6	6	5
12	Germany	7	2	8	8	17	7	4
13	Sweden	1	12	1	1	9	4	7
14	France	17	5	22	22	7	12	
15	Russia	26	25	25	16	18	25	
16	Italy	2	3	3	9	1	2	10
17	Slovenia	13	15	14	13	19	14	
18	Finland	16	9	13	19	24	17	
19	Spain	4	1	6	2	4	1	12
20	Switzerland	25	24	23	20	20	26	
21	Hungary	5	4	2	3	5	3	8
22	Malta	8	23	7	17	8	10	1
23	Denmark	20	21	24	21	11	21	
24	Netherlands	19	20	12	11	21	18	
25	San Marino	10	11	10	10	10	8	3
26	United Kingdom	21	7	11	12	12	11	
