= Hersi Matmuja =

Albanian singer and songwriter

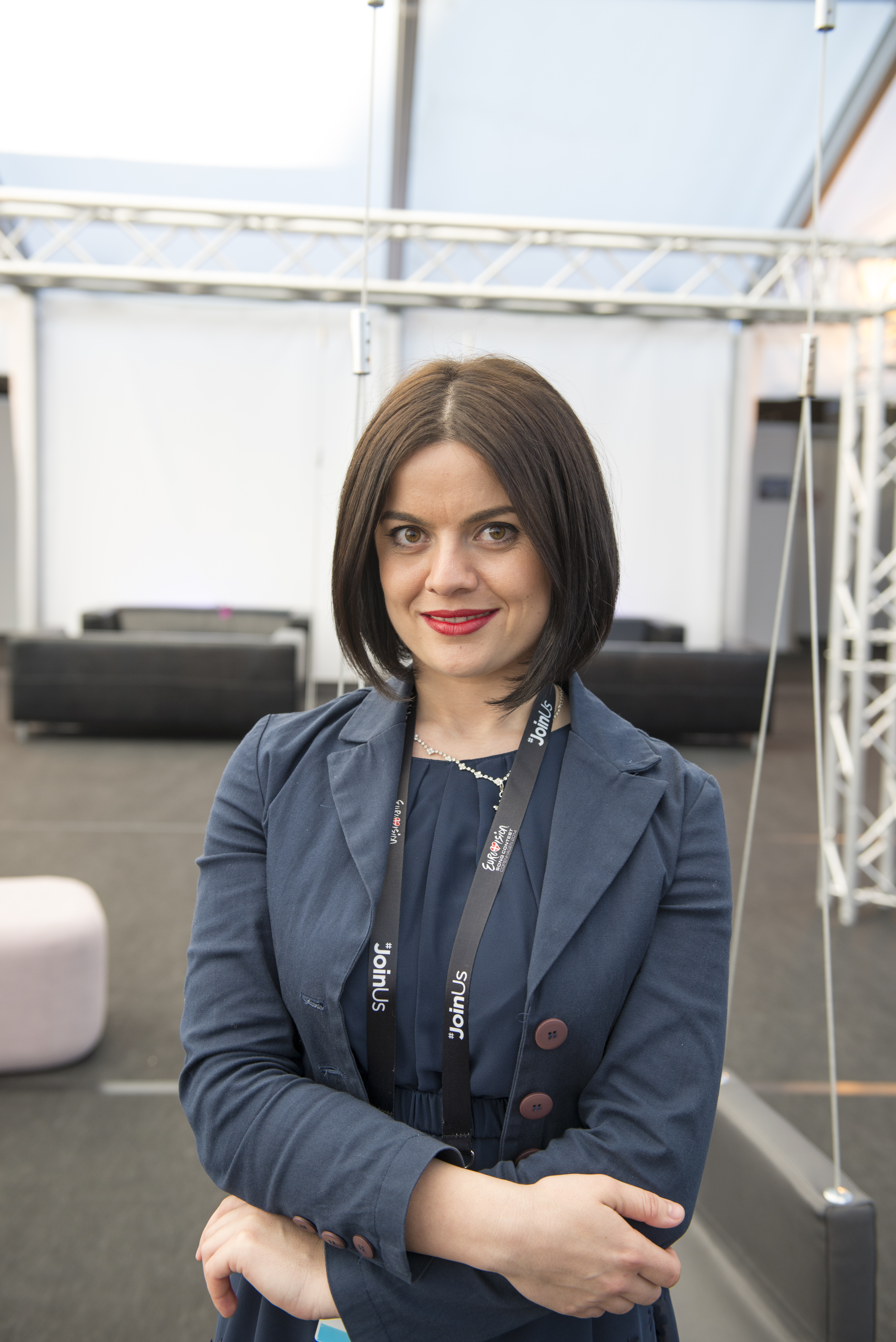
- Matmuja at the Eurovision Song Contest 2014

Background information
- Also known as: Hersi
- Born: Hersjana Matmuja; 1 February 1990 (age 36); Kukës, Albania
- Occupations: Singer; songwriter
- Years active: 2003–present

Hersjana Matmuja (born 1 February 1990), also known as Hersi Matmuja or simply Hersi, is an Albanian singer and songwriter. After winning the 52nd edition of Festivali i Këngës, she represented Albania in the Eurovision Song Contest 2014.

== Life and career ==
Hersi Matmuja was born on February 1, 1990, in Kukës. She started singing when she was 8 years old and as a child participated in many festivals and talent shows. During that time, she also studied Canto at Liceu "Jordan Misja" in Tirana, where she received the highest possible grade of 10/10 upon completion. In 2003, she provided the singing voice of Melody in the Albanian dub of The Little Mermaid II: Return to the Sea, when she was only 13 years old.

While Hersi was studying at the Liceu, she participated for the first time at the Festivali i Kenges, when she was 16 years old, winning First Prize in the Youth Category for her rendition of the song "Ah jetë, oh jetë" composed by Frederik Ndoci. She returned to participate in the Festivali i Këngës three more times. Hersi also participated twice in Kënga Magjike.

In 2009, she auditioned for enrollment at the "Santa Cecilia" Conservatory in Rome (qualifying first among all applicants), where she studied canto and started committing professionally to music, participating in concerts and Classical music competitions. In October 2014, she graduated from the Santa Cecilia Conservatory with the maximum score of 30/30 and the title of "Maestro".

Despite her classical music training, Hersi says her musical influences include Etta James, Ella Fitzgerald, Nina Simone, Lady Gaga, Celine Dion, Rihanna, Björk and ABBA. She studies at Accademia Nazionale di Santa Cecilia in Rome.

Matmuja presenting herself and the song she was performing in the Eurovision Song Contest 2014.

Matmuja was among the 16 participants taking part at the 52nd edition of Festivali i Këngës. Her song "Zemërimi i një nate" (One night's anger) was written by Jorgo Papingji and composed by Genti Lako. She performed on the first presentation night and shortly became a favourite to win the show. She opened the final night and received 69 points from the jury, thus getting the rights to represent Albania in the Eurovision Song Contest 2014 in Copenhagen, Denmark. She left Klodian Kaçani and "Me ty" behind with 24 points. The Eurovision version of Zemërimi i një nate (One Night's Anger) and official video was released on 20 March. Matmuja performed in the first semi final, on 6 May, but placed fifteenth out of sixteen acts in the semi-final and did not qualify for the final on 10 May.

== Discography ==
=== Singles ===
==== As lead artist ====
- 2006: Ah jetë, oh jetë
- 2010: Me cilin rri ti dashuri
- 2011: Natë moj natë
- 2011: Aty ku më le
- 2012: Kthehu (ft. Gjergj Leka)
- 2012: Animon
- 2012: Kush ta dha këtë emër
- 2013: Zemërimi i një nate
- 2014: One Night's Anger
- 2021: Kënga e çobanit

Awards and achievements
| Preceded by Adrian Lulgjuraj and Bledar Sejko with "Identitet" | Festivali i Këngës; Winner; 2013 | Succeeded by Elhaida Dani with "Diell" |
| Preceded by Adrian Lulgjuraj and Bledar Sejko with "Identitet" | Albania in the Eurovision Song Contest; 2014 | Succeeded by Elhaida Dani with "I'm Alive" |
