= Bledar Sejko =

Albanian guitarist, composer and singer

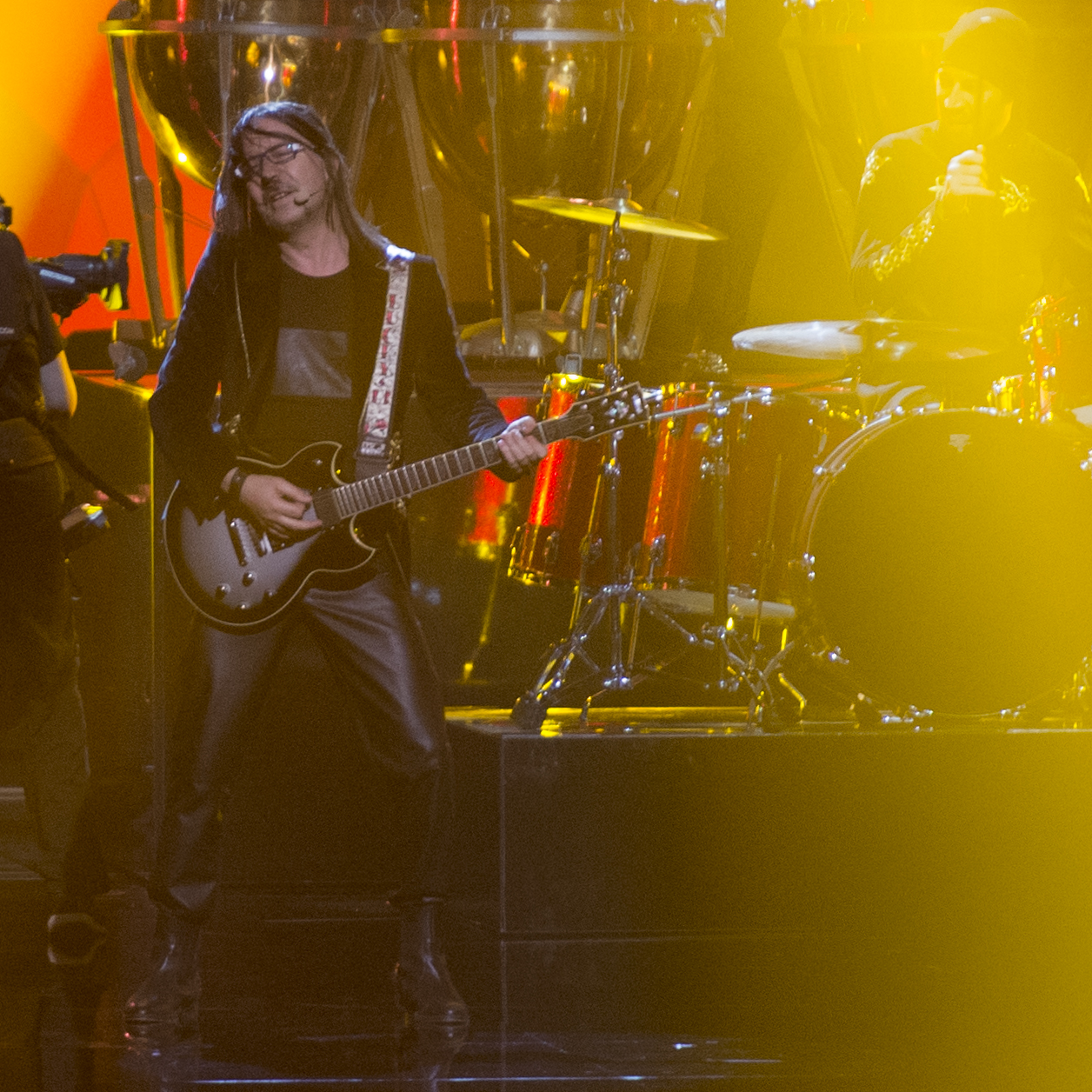
- Sejko at the Eurovision Song Contest 2013

Background information
- Born: February 19, 1971 (age 55); Tirana, SR Albania
- Genres: Rock
- Occupations: Guitarist; singer; composer
- Instrument: Guitar
- Years active: Late 1980s-

Bledar Sejko (born February 19, 1971) is an Albanian guitarist, composer, and singer who represented Albania in the Eurovision Song Contest 2013 in Malmö with his song "Identitet", which he performed with Adrian Lulgjuraj. According to Sejko, the song includes combined motives from Northern Albania and Chameria. He also appeared in the 2011 edition of the contest, performing alongside Aurela Gaçe in her song Feel the Passion.

Sejko's first group, which included Redon Makashi and Elton Deda was one of the first pop groups of Albania created in clandestinity in the late 1980s: Communist Albania did not allow pop music to be recorded, performed or broadcast. Sejko's nickname has always been Qepa (Onion). He taught guitar to Makashi and has always been known as a great performer of the instrument in Albania. He created Megahertz, the first rock band in Albania.

Sejko's last participation to the Festivali i Këngës before "Identitet" had been in 1992 with his group Thunder Way. Their song, "Legjenda e Heroit" (The Hero's Legend), had come last in that festival.

Awards and achievements
Preceded by Rona Nishliu with "Suus"	Albania in the Eurovision Song Contest; 2013	Succeeded by Hersi with "One Night's Anger"
