= Rezarta Smaja =

Albanian singer (born 1984)

- Born: 23 March 1984 (age 41); Shkodër, PSR Albania
- Genres: Pop rock
- Occupation: Singer
- Years active: 2008–present
- Labels: Independent

Rezarta Smaja (born 23 March 1984) is an Albanian singer.

== Life and career ==
Rezarta Smaja was born on 23 March 1984 in Shkodër, a city located in northern Albania. She began her music career in rock bands and sang at various music events in her hometown. Her professional career started after her decision to compete at Ethet (Albanian Idol) where she was a finalist. Smaja decided to continue her career participating at music festivals in Albania, such as Top Fest, Kënga Magjike and Festivali i Këngës. She has performed live in Tirana.

Smaja made her debut appearance in the 51st Festivali i Këngës with the song "Ti" and finished 7th. The following year, she returned to the 52nd Festivali i Këngës, performing "Në zemër" and placing 7th again. She participated in the 2014 Kënga Magjike with "Shpirt i lirë" (Free spirit) and made it through to the final, held on 13 December 2014. Later that month, she competed at the 53rd Festivali i Këngës, with "Më rrëmbe" (Take me away), a song written by Dr. Flori, an Albanian singer-songwriter who died in November 2014. She qualified to the final and placed 7th once again. She competed in the 54th Festivali i Këngës with the song "Dashuri në përjetësi" (Love in eternity), a duet with Klodian Kaçani. They finished 4th in the final. She also competed in the 55th Festivali i Këngës with the song ""Pse prite gjatë", which came 7th as well. In the 56th Festivali i Këngës, she and her duet partner Luiz Ejlli were voted the fan favorites, but did not make the podium. The full results were never disclosed. After a break, Smaja returned for the 60th Festivali i Këngës and finished 3rd with her entry "E jemja nuse".

== Discography ==
=== Singles ===
- 2009 - "Pranë dhe larg" (Near and far)
- 2012 - "Ti" (You)
- 2013 - "Dorëzuar" (Surrendered)
- 2013 - "Në zemër" (In my heart)
- 2014 - "Shpirt i lirë" (Free Spirit)
- 2014 - "Më rrëmbe" (Take me away)
- 2015 - "Dashuri në përjetësi" (Love in eternity) (with Klodian Kaçani)
- 2016 - "Pse prite gjatë" (Why did you wait so long?)
- 2017 - "Ra një yll" (A star fell) (with Luiz Ejlli)
- 2021 - "E jemja nuse" (I was a bride)
