= Albania in the Eurovision Song Contest =

- Eurovision Song Contest
- Participating broadcaster: Radio Televizioni Shqiptar (RTSH)

Participation summary
- Appearances: 22 (13 finals)
- First appearance: 2004
- Highest placement: 5th: 2012
- Participation history: 2004; 2005; 2006; 2007; 2008; 2009; 2010; 2011; 2012; 2013; 2014; 2015; 2016; 2017; 2018; 2019; ~~2020~~; 2021; 2022; 2023; 2024; 2025; 2026

Related articles
- Festivali i Këngës
- Albania's page at Eurovision.com
- For the most recent participation see Albania in the Eurovision Song Contest 2026

Albania has been represented at the Eurovision Song Contest 22 times since its debut in 2004. The Albanian participating broadcaster in the contest is Radio Televizioni Shqiptar (RTSH), which selects its entry each year through the national final Festivali i Këngës, a longstanding song competition held yearly since 1962.

Albania's debut in 2004 was successful, with "The Image of You" by Anjeza Shahini, finishing in 7th place. It remained the country's best result until 2012, when "Suus" by Rona Nishliu finished 5th. The country also reached the top ten in 2025, finishing eighth with "Zjerm" by Shkodra Elektronike. Albania has participated every year since their debut and has made it to the final 13 out of 22 times.

== Participation ==
Radio Televizioni Shqiptar (RTSH) is a full member of the European Broadcasting Union (EBU), making it eligible to participate in the Eurovision Song Contest. It has competed in the contest representing Albania since its 49th edition in 2004.

== History ==
=== 2000s ===
RTSH expressed their intention to participate in the 2002 and 2003 editions. However, they were denied participation because of the large number of countries taking part.

Nevertheless, it debuted at the 2004 contest in Istanbul with the song "The Image of You" performed by Anjeza Shahini. The country received 106 points in the Grand Final and finished in 7th place, remaining the country's highest placement until 2012.

In 2005, due to the country's top 11 placement the previous year, the succeeding entry "Tomorrow I Go" by Ledina Çelo automatically qualified for the Grand Final in Kyiv and reached 16th place.

The following year, Luiz Ejlli and his song "Zjarr e ftohtë" failed to qualify for the Grand Final in Athens, marking the first non-qualification in the country's participation history.

The 2007 entry, "Hear My Plea" by Frederik Ndoci, was performed at Festivali I Këngës 45 as "Balada e gurit" (The stone ballad). In the end, the song was finally revamped, mixing it with English and Albanian. In the Semi-Final of the 2007 contest, it received 49 points, placing 17th out of 28 in the Semi-Final, thus failing to qualify for the Final.

The winner of Festivali I Këngës 46 was "Zemrën e lamë peng" (Hearts trapped in time) by Olta Boka. However, the result of the juries that selected the winner was controversial and rumours arose that the final two judges intentionally awarded high marks to Boka in order to avoid sending the runners-up, Flaka Krelani and Doruntina Disha, to the contest. Press reactions in Albania were not happy with the decision, and RTSH announced that they would investigate into alleged cheating by the final two judges to award their points. Despite this, Olta Boka's victory remained, and she sang for Albania at the Eurovision Song Contest 2008 in Belgrade, Serbia. She qualified for the Final, coming 9th in a field of 19 in the 2nd Semi-Final, and in the Final she received 55 points, coming 17th in a field of 25.

Albania was the first country to select both their artist and publicly present their song for Eurovision 2009. The winner was again selected by Festivali I Këngës. The winner of Festivali I Këngës 47 was Kejsi Tola with the song "Më merr në ëndërr" (Take me in your dreams), composed by the same people of Albania's first entry, Edmond Zhulali and Agim Doçi. The song was performed in English as "Carry Me in Your Dreams". Albania finished 7th out of 19 in the 2nd Semi-Final with 73 points, thus qualifying for the Final. In the Final, Albania scored 48 points, finishing 17th in a field of 25. It placed 11th in the televoting while only 23rd in the jury vote.

=== 2010s ===
The winner of Festivali I Këngës 48 was decided on 27 December, with Juliana Pasha winning over former winner Anjeza Shahini. She represented Albania at Eurovision 2010 in Oslo with the song "It's All about You". The song was a typical up-tempo composition, and has been compared to Christina Aguilera's "Keeps Gettin' Better" and Britney Spears' "Womanizer". Albania came 6th in the first semi-final with 76 points, thus qualifying for the final. In the final, Juliana finished 16th with 62 points which included 12 points from Macedonia.

The Albanian participant for the Eurovision Song Contest 2011 was chosen in Festivali i Këngës 49 in December 2010. The winner of 2011's Festival of Song was Aurela Gaçe, winning for the third time after 10 years. Her song was named "Kënga ime" ("My Song") and it was translated into English with the name "Feel the Passion", published on 12 March 2011, during a show called "Historia nis këtu" ("The story begins here") in RTSH. Albania participated in Semi-Final 1 against 18 other countries, fighting for a place in the grand final in 14 May. However they missed out on qualification for the final for the first time in 4 years, coming 14th.

Albania competed in the 2012 competition with the song "Suus", which was performed by Rona Nishliu. The song got through to the final, coming in 5th place overall with 146 points. Rona Nishliu from Kosovo achieved a record result for Albania.

Albania competed in the 2013 Eurovision Song Contest with the song "Identitet" which was performed by Adrian Lulgjuraj and Bledar Sejko. This song was chosen as the winner through the Festivali i Këngës. The results depended on the jury voting only. Among the experts in the jury was the Italian Head of Delegation at the Eurovision Song Contest, Nicola Caligiore, who greeted and gave the points in English for all the viewers from the Eurovision.tv webcast. Albania came 15th in the second semi-final of the Eurovision Song Contest 2013 in Malmö and did not make it into the grand final.

On 28 December 2013, Herciana Matmuja won Festivali i Këngës 52 (the 52nd national final of Albania) and was therefore chosen to represent Albania in Eurovision 2014 with her song 'Zemërimi i një nate'. In the time before Eurovision 2014 she recorded both English and Albanian versions of this song. On 16 March she released the final version of 'One Night's anger' for Eurovision 2014. Albania failed to qualify for the second year in a row.

On 28 December 2014, Elhaida Dani won Festivali i Këngës 53 with the song "Diell", and this would've represented Albania at the Eurovision Song Contest 2015. On 23 February 2015 it was announced that the songwriters had decided to withdraw the song due to "personal and irrevocable reasons", and Dani would perform something else at Eurovision. The following day it was revealed that Dani would perform "I'm Alive".

On 27 December 2015 Eneda Tarifa won Festivali i Këngës 54 with her song "Përrallë" which meant she would represent Albania in the Eurovision Song Contest 2016. It was later translated into English and called "Fairytale", and the music video premiered on the evening news on TVSH. Albania failed to qualify, coming only 16th out of 18 in the second semi-final.

After failing to qualify once again in 2017 with Lindita and the song "World", Albania returned to the grand final in 2018 with the song "Mall" by Eugent Bushpepa. It finished 11th of 26 in the final receiving 184 points, giving Albania its fourth best result in the contest since their debut.

In 2019, Albania selected Jonida Maliqi to represent them with the song "Ktheju tokës". Albania succeeded in qualifying from the second semi-final, making it the first time Albania had qualified twice in a row since 2009 and 2010. In the final, she placed 17th with 90 points.

=== 2020s ===
For the 2020 contest, Albania selected Arilena Ara to represent their country after she won Festivali i Këngës 58 with the song "Shaj" on 22 December 2019. On 9 March 2020, a revamped version of the song named "Fall from the Sky" was released in English. However, the 2020 contest was cancelled on 18 March 2020 due to the COVID-19 pandemic in Europe.

For the 2021 contest, RTSH announced that Arilena Ara would not be internally re-selected to represent Albania, and that Festivali i Këngës 59 would go ahead as planned. The national final took place on 23 December 2020 and was won by Anxhela Peristeri with the song "Karma". Anxhela managed to qualify for the final, making it the first time since 2008-2010 that Albania qualified three times in a row. In the final, she placed 21st with 57 points.

For the 2022 contest, Ronela Hajati won Festivali i Këngës 60 and was selected to represent the country with the song "Sekret". It underwent a revamp ahead of Eurovision which saw lines in English and Spanish being added. However, it failed to qualify for the final, coming 12th out of 17 in the first semi-final.

For the 2023 contest, Albina Kelmendi and her family finished second in Festivali i Këngës 61, but were selected to represent the country with the song "Duje" by the public. They managed to qualify for the final, finishing 9th with 83 points. In the final, they placed 22nd with 76 points.

For the 2024 contest, the selection method used in 2023 was retained, with Besa and the song "Zemrën n'dorë" coming first in the televoting of Festivali i Këngës 62. For Eurovision, the song was revamped and renamed "Titan". Performed in the second semi-final, the song failed to qualify for the final, placing 15th out of 16th countries.

For the 2025 contest, Festivali i Këngës 63 was organised with a revamped format, in which the winner would represent Albania at the 2025 contest in Basel, Switzerland. Diaspora voting was also introduced alongside a new presentation of results. Ultimately, Shkodra Elektronike won the festival with "Zjerm". The duo went on to become the highest scoring Albanian entrants since 2012, securing 218 points in the 2025 final and finishing in 8th place.

For the 2026 contest, Alis and his song "Nân" was chosen to represent Albania after winning Festivali i Këngës 64. He placed 7th in his semifinal to qualify for the final on 14 May, at which he placed 13th out of 25 with 145 points.

== Participation overview ==
Table key
2	Second place
◁	Last place
◇	Entry selected but did not compete
†	Upcoming event

Year	Artist	Song	Language	Final	Points	Semi	Points
2004	Anjeza Shahini	"The Image of You"	English	7	106	4	167
2005	Ledina Çelo	"Tomorrow I Go"	English	16	53	Top 12 in 2004 final (Note: According to the then-Eurovision rules, the top ten non-Big Four countries from the previous year along with the Big Four automatically qualified for the grand final without having to compete in semi-finals. For example, if two Big Four countries were placed inside the top ten, the 11th and 12th spots would be advanced to next year's grand final, along with all countries ranked in the top ten.)	
2006	Luiz Ejlli	"Zjarr e ftohtë"	Albanian	Failed to qualify		14	58
2007	Frederik Ndoci	"Hear My Plea"	English, Albanian	Failed to qualify		17	49
2008	Olta Boka	"Zemrën e lamë peng"	Albanian	17	55	9	67
2009	Kejsi Tola	"Carry Me in Your Dreams"	English	17	48	7	73
2010	Juliana Pasha	"It's All About You"	English	16	62	6	76
2011	Aurela Gaçe	"Feel the Passion"	English, Albanian	Failed to qualify		14	47
2012	Rona Nishliu	"Suus"	Albanian	5	146	2	146
2013	Adrian Lulgjuraj and Bledar Sejko	"Identitet"	Albanian	Failed to qualify		15	31
2014	Hersi	"One Night's Anger"	English	Failed to qualify		15	22
2015	Elhaida Dani	"I'm Alive"	English	17	34	10	62
2016	Eneda Tarifa	"Fairytale"	English	Failed to qualify		16	45
2017	Lindita	"World"	English	Failed to qualify		14	76
2018	Eugent Bushpepa	"Mall"	Albanian	11	184	8	162
2019	Jonida Maliqi	"Ktheju tokës"	Albanian	17	90	9	96
2020	Arilena Ara ◇	"Fall from the Sky" ◇	English ◇	Contest cancelled (Note: The 2020 contest was cancelled due to the COVID-19 pandemic.)			
2021	Anxhela Peristeri	"Karma"	Albanian	21	57	10	112
2022	Ronela Hajati	"Sekret"	Albanian, English	Failed to qualify		12	58
2023	Albina and Familja Kelmendi	"Duje"	Albanian	22	76	9	83
2024	Besa	"Titan"	English	Failed to qualify		15	14
2025	Shkodra Elektronike	"Zjerm"	Albanian	8	218	2	122
2026	Alis	"Nân"	Albanian	13	145	7	158
2027	Confirmed intention to participate †						

== Songs by language ==
1. English (52.3%)
2. Albanian (47.7%)

Songs	Language	Years
13	English	2004, 2005, 2007, 2009, 2010, 2011, 2014, 2015, 2016, 2017, ~~2020~~, 2022, 2024
13	Albanian	2006, 2007, 2008, 2011, 2012, 2013, 2018, 2019, 2021, 2022, 2023, 2025, 2026

== Related involvement ==
=== Heads of delegation ===
Year	Head of delegation	Ref.
2025	Edvin Shvarc	

=== Commentators and spokespersons ===
For the contest's broadcast on Radio Televizioni Shqiptar (RTSH), various commentators and spokespersons have been hired throughout the years, with Leon Menkshi and Andri Xhahu notably having done the job on eight and thirteen occasions respectively. At Eurovision, after all points are calculated, the presenters of the show call upon each voting country to invite their respective spokesperson to announce the results of their vote on-screen.

Commentators and spokespersons
Year	Commentator	Spokesperson	Ref.
2003	Unknown	Did not participate	
2004	Leon Menkshi	Zhani Ciko	
2005	Leon Menkshi	Zhani Ciko	
2006	Leon Menkshi	Leon Menkshi	
2007	Leon Menkshi	Leon Menkshi	
2008	Leon Menkshi	Leon Menkshi	
2009	Leon Menkshi	Leon Menkshi	
2010	Leon Menkshi	Leon Menkshi	
2011	Leon Menkshi	Leon Menkshi	
2012	Andri Xhahu		
2013	Andri Xhahu		
2014	Andri Xhahu		
2015	Andri Xhahu		
2016	Andri Xhahu		
2017	Andri Xhahu		
2018	Andri Xhahu		
2019	Andri Xhahu		
2021	Andri Xhahu		
2022	Andri Xhahu		
2023	Andri Xhahu		
2024	Andri Xhahu		
2025	Andri Xhahu		
2026	Andri Xhahu		

== Awards ==
Barbara Dex Award
Year	Performer(s)	Host city	Ref.
2012	Rona Nishliu	(Azerbaijan) Baku	

== Photo gallery ==
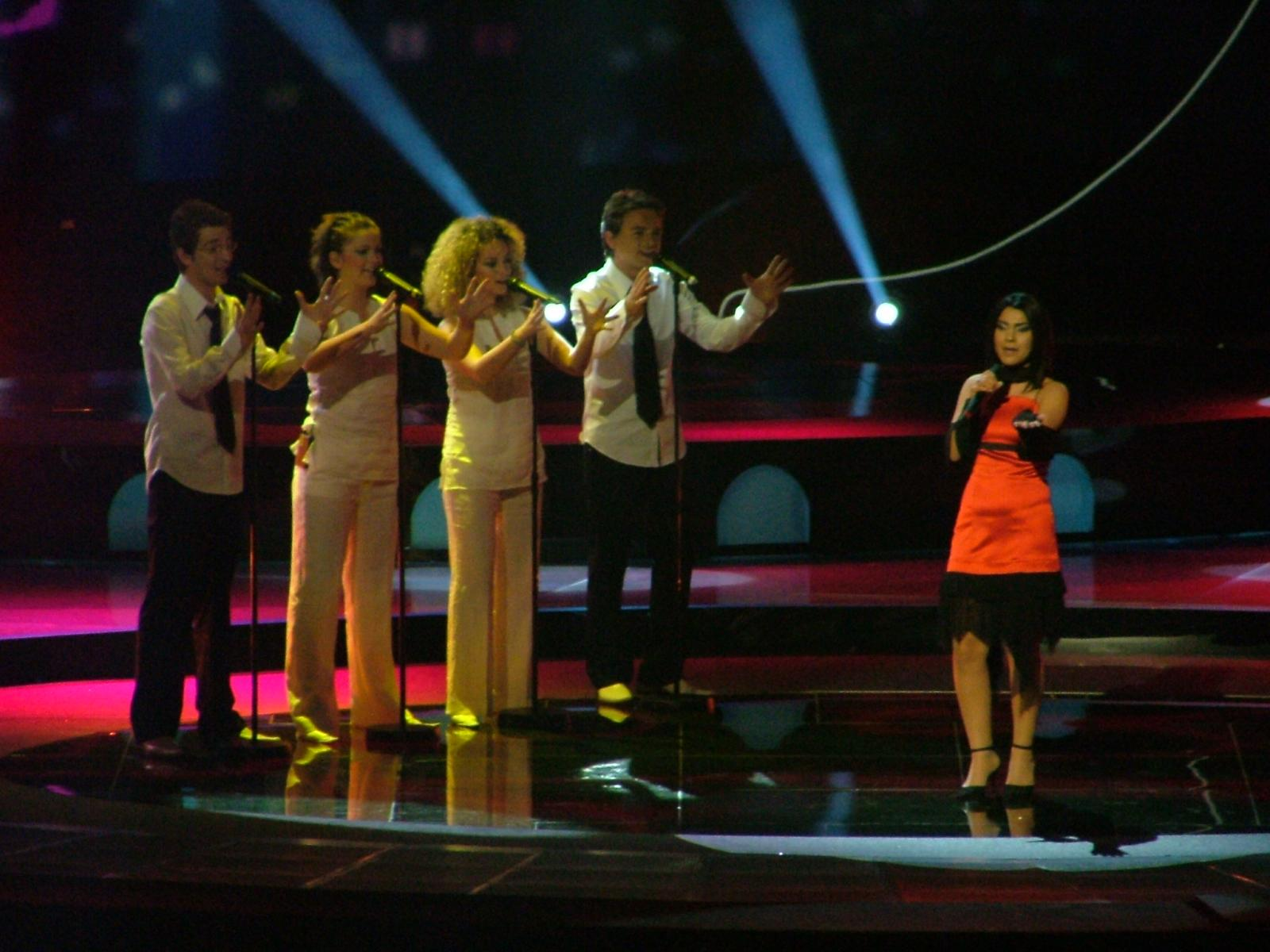
Anjeza Shahini in Istanbul (2004)

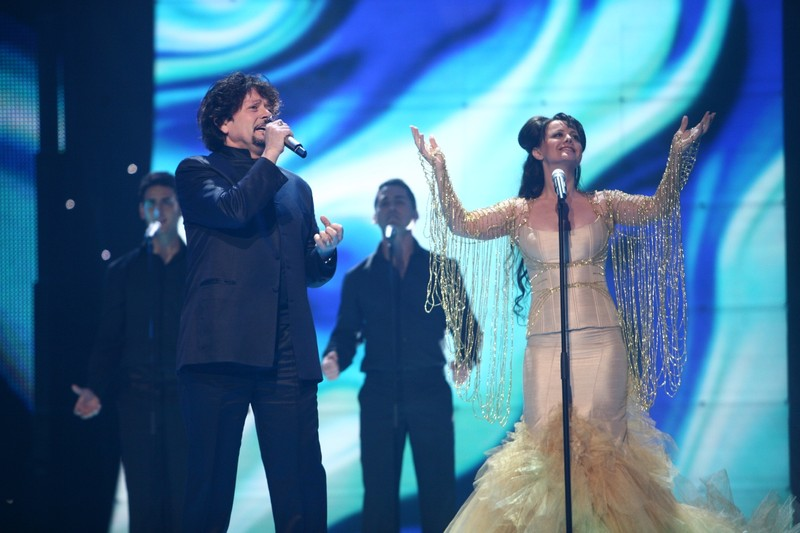
Frederik Ndoci and Aida Ndoci in Helsinki (2007)

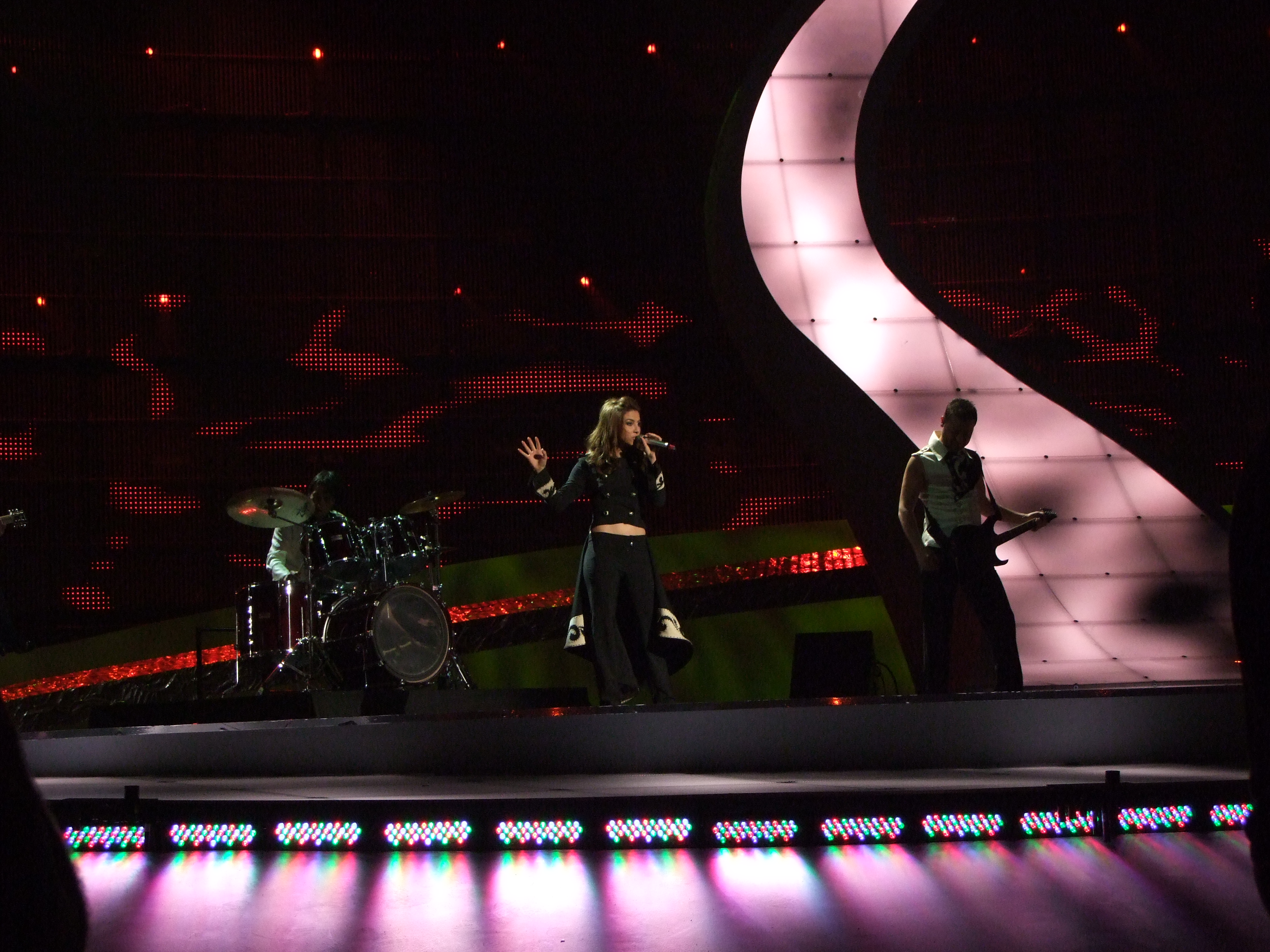
Olta Boka in Belgrade (2008)

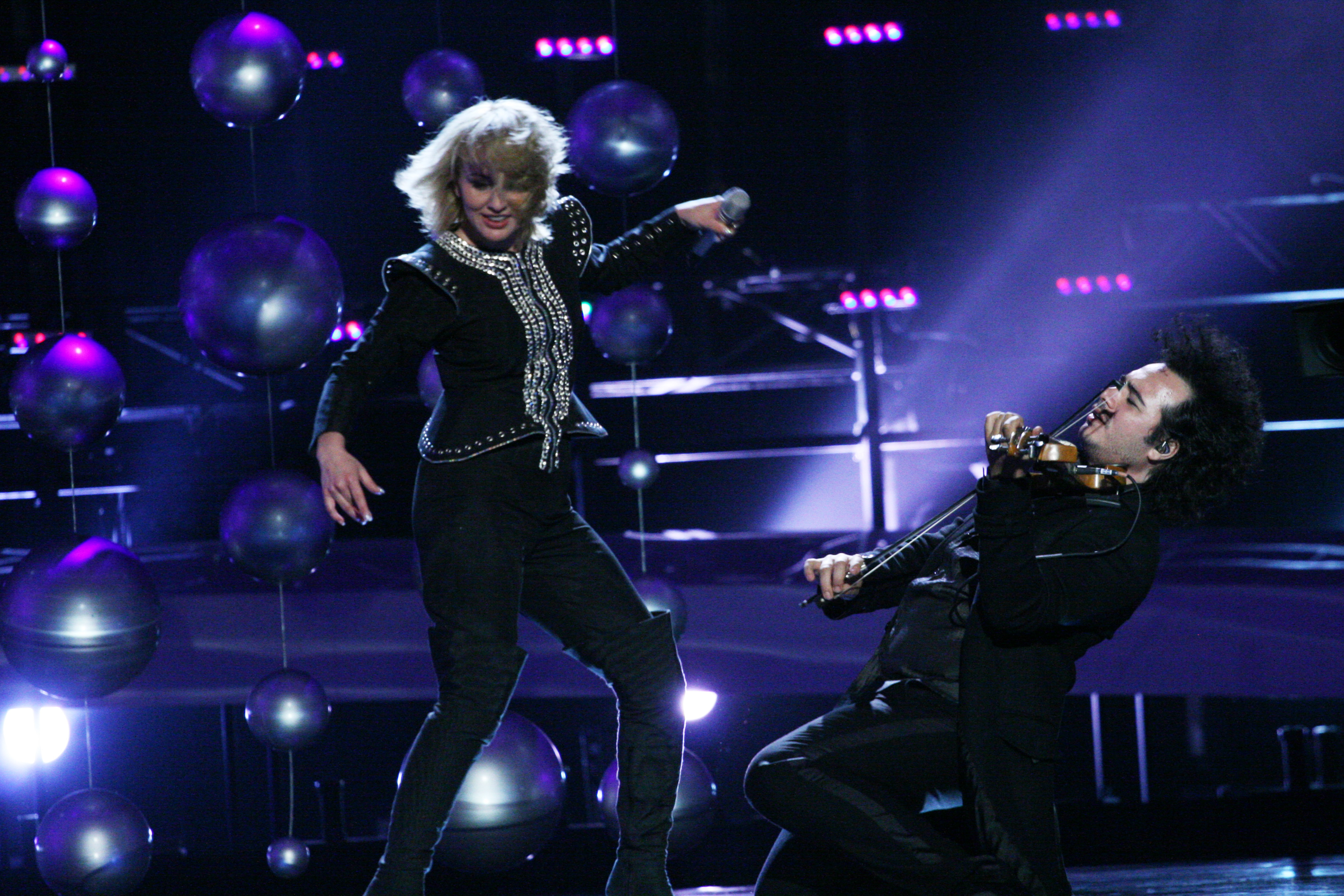
Juliana Pasha in Oslo (2010)

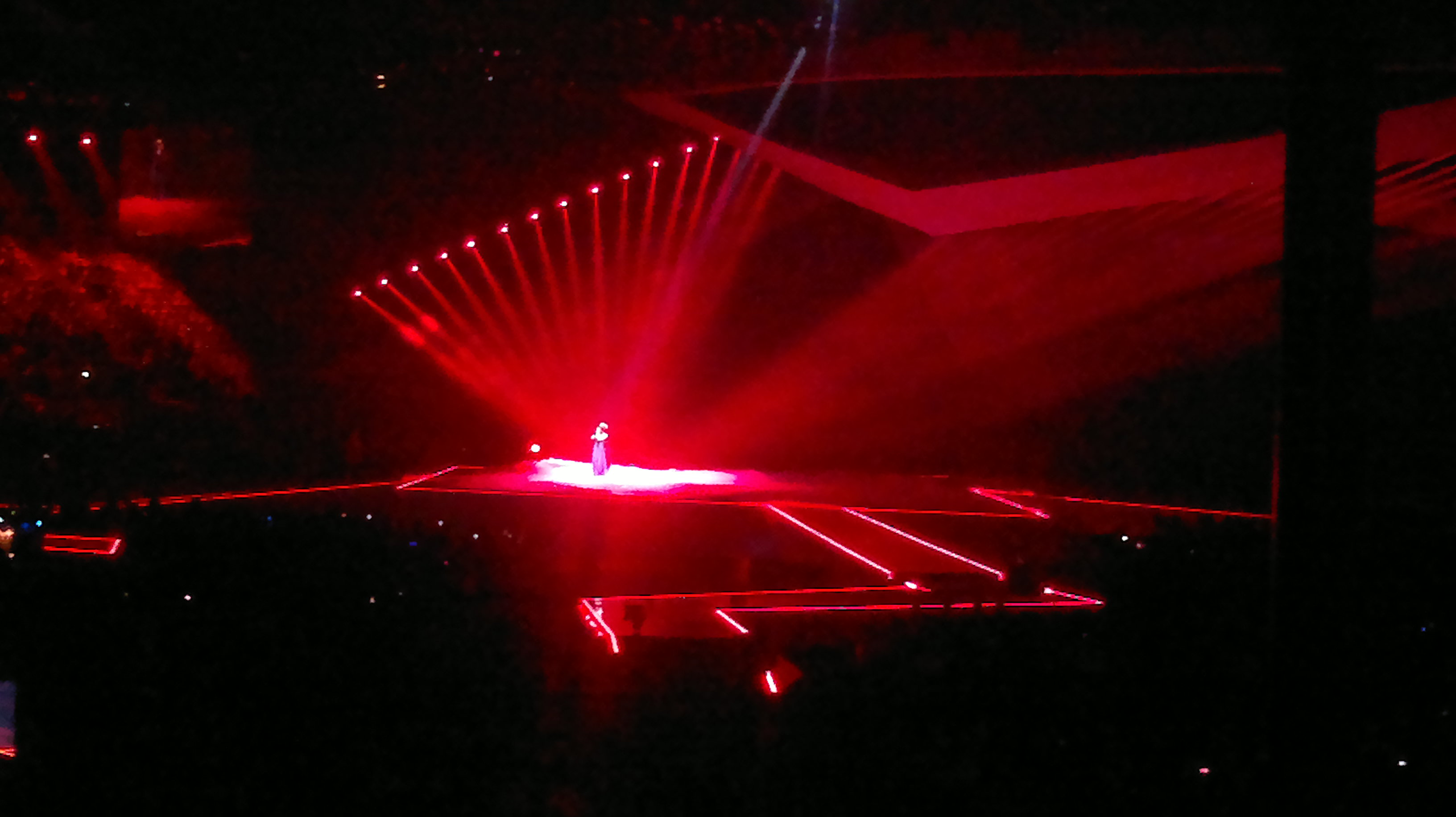
Rona Nishliu in Baku (2012)

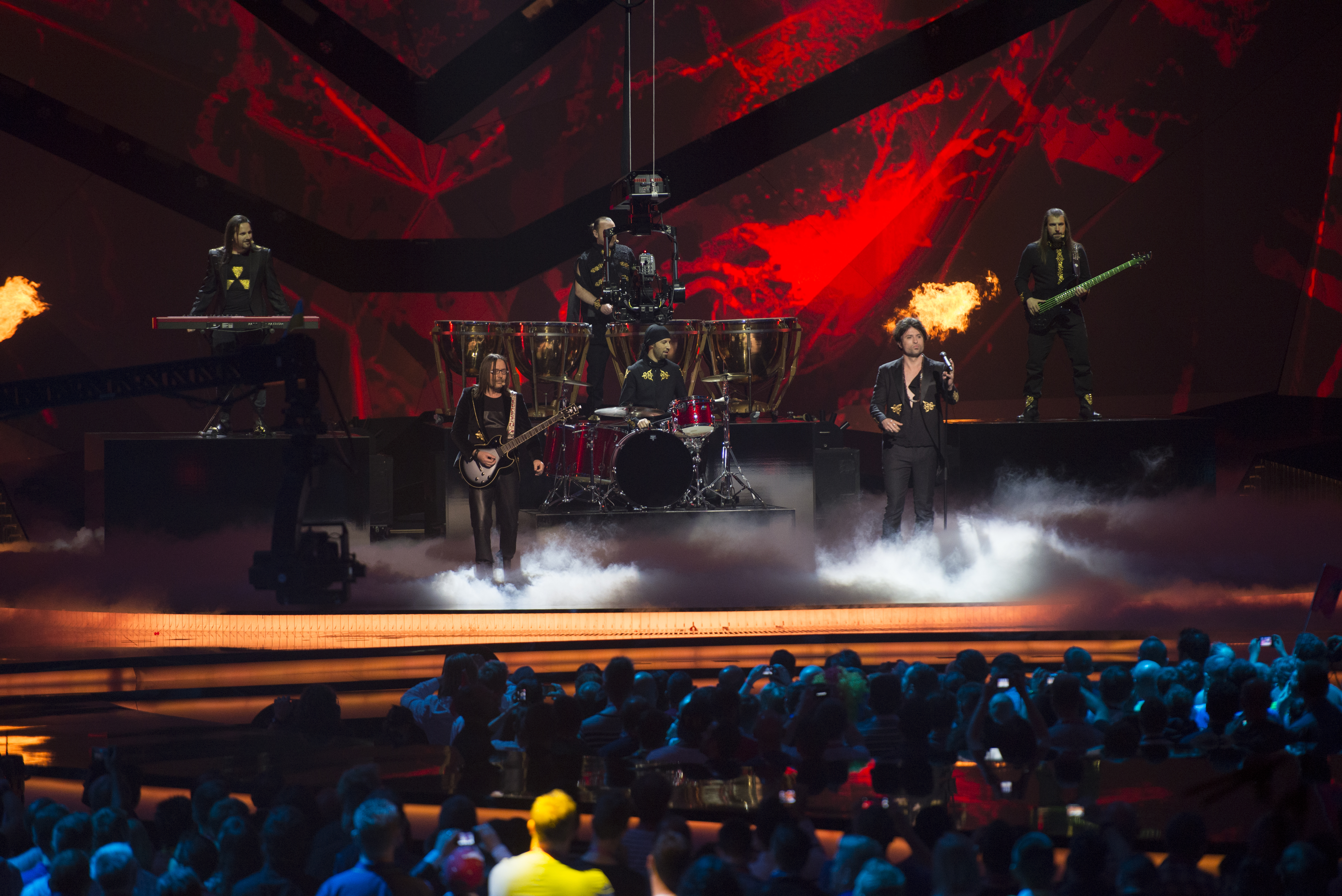
Adrian Lulgjuraj & Bledar Sejko in Malmö (2013)

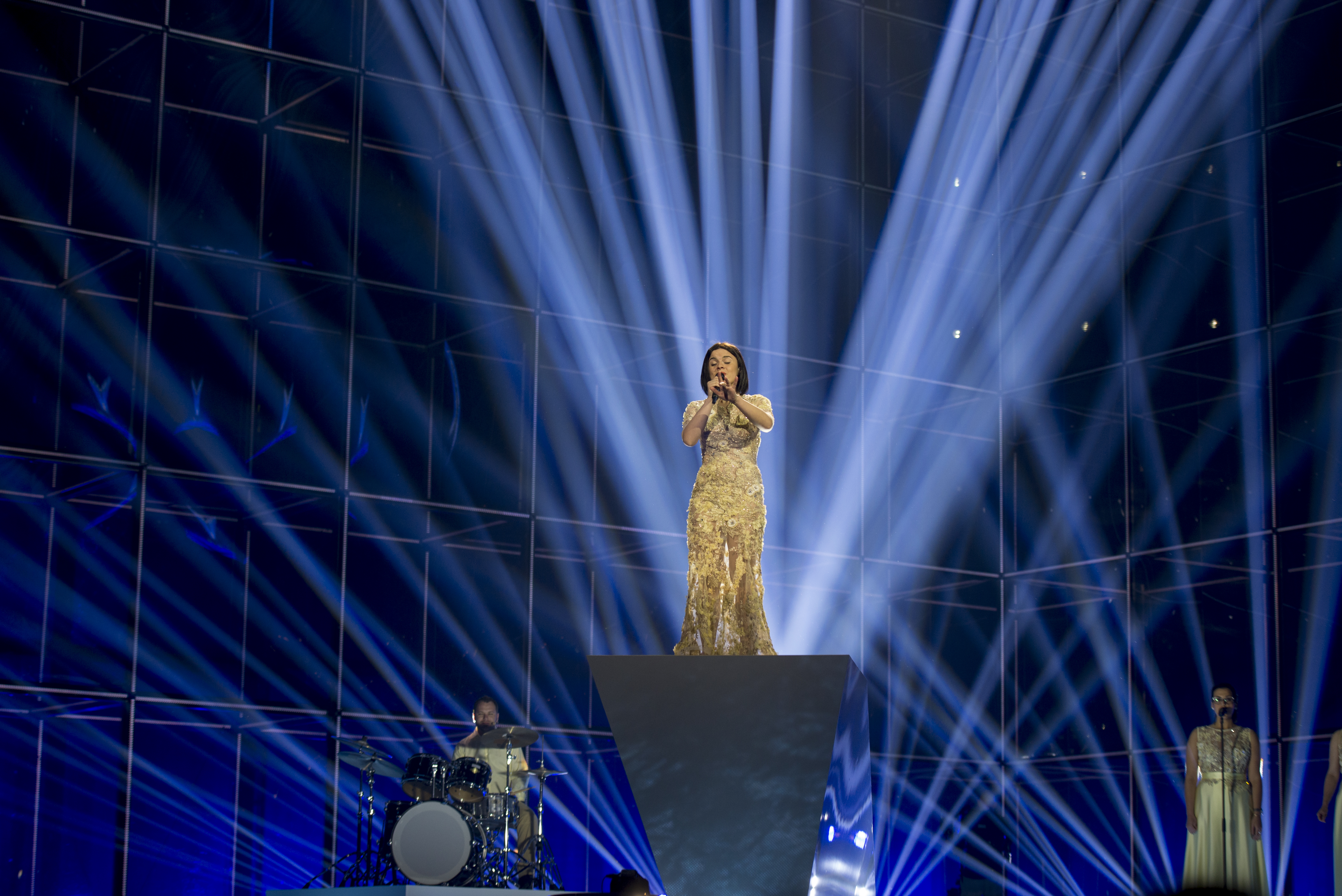
Hersi Matmuja in Copenhagen (2014)

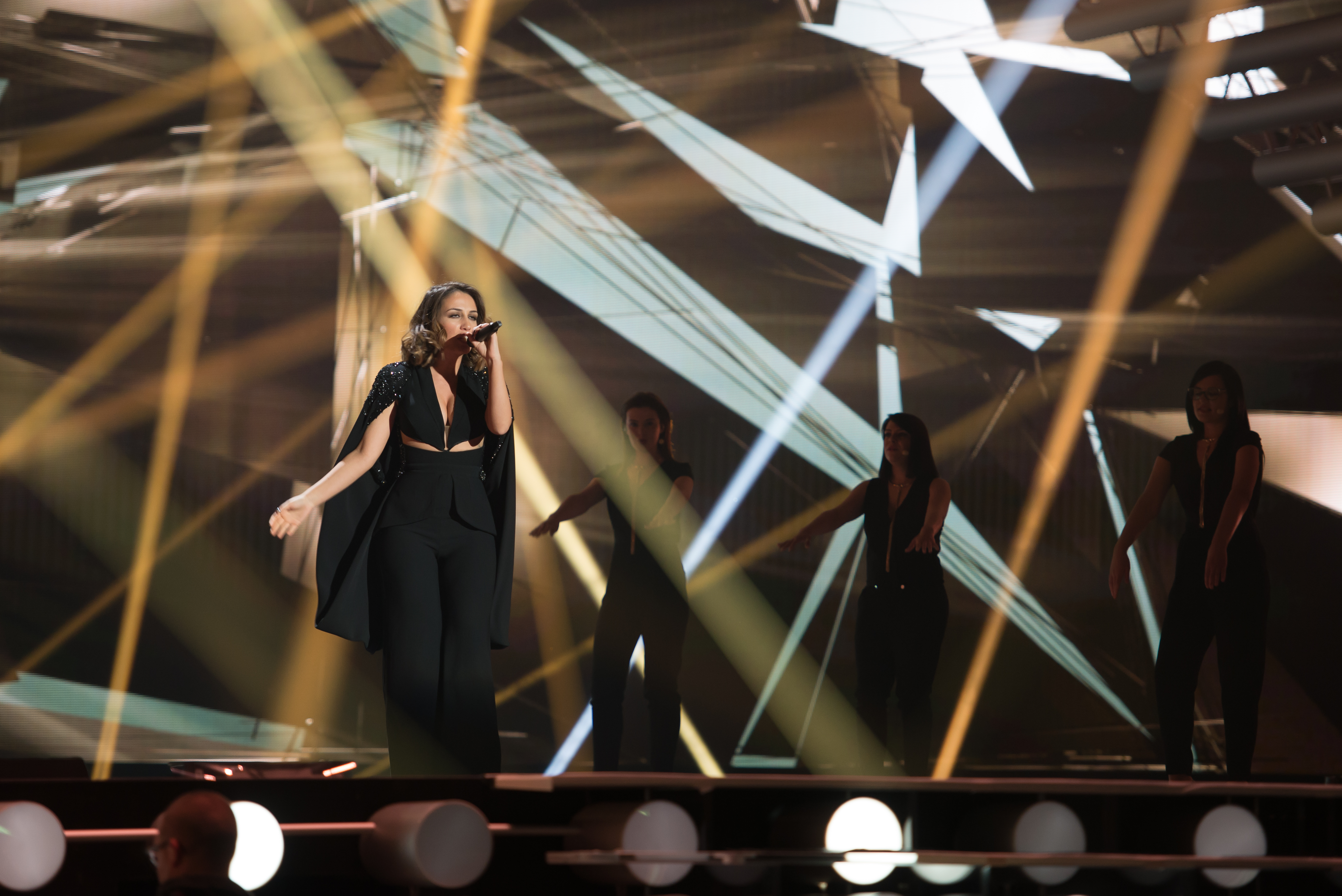
Elhaida Dani in Vienna (2015)

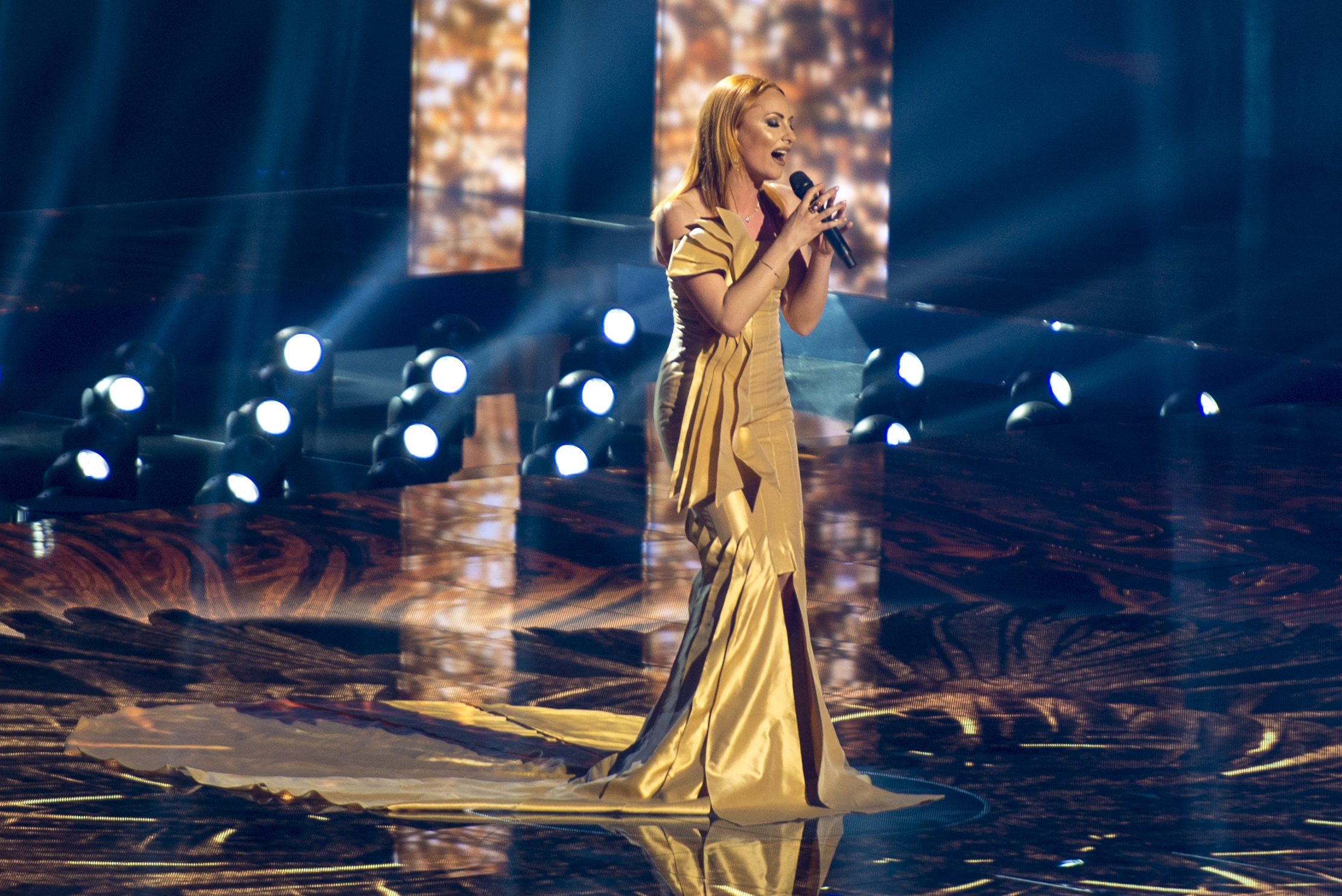
Eneda Tarifa in Stockholm (2016)

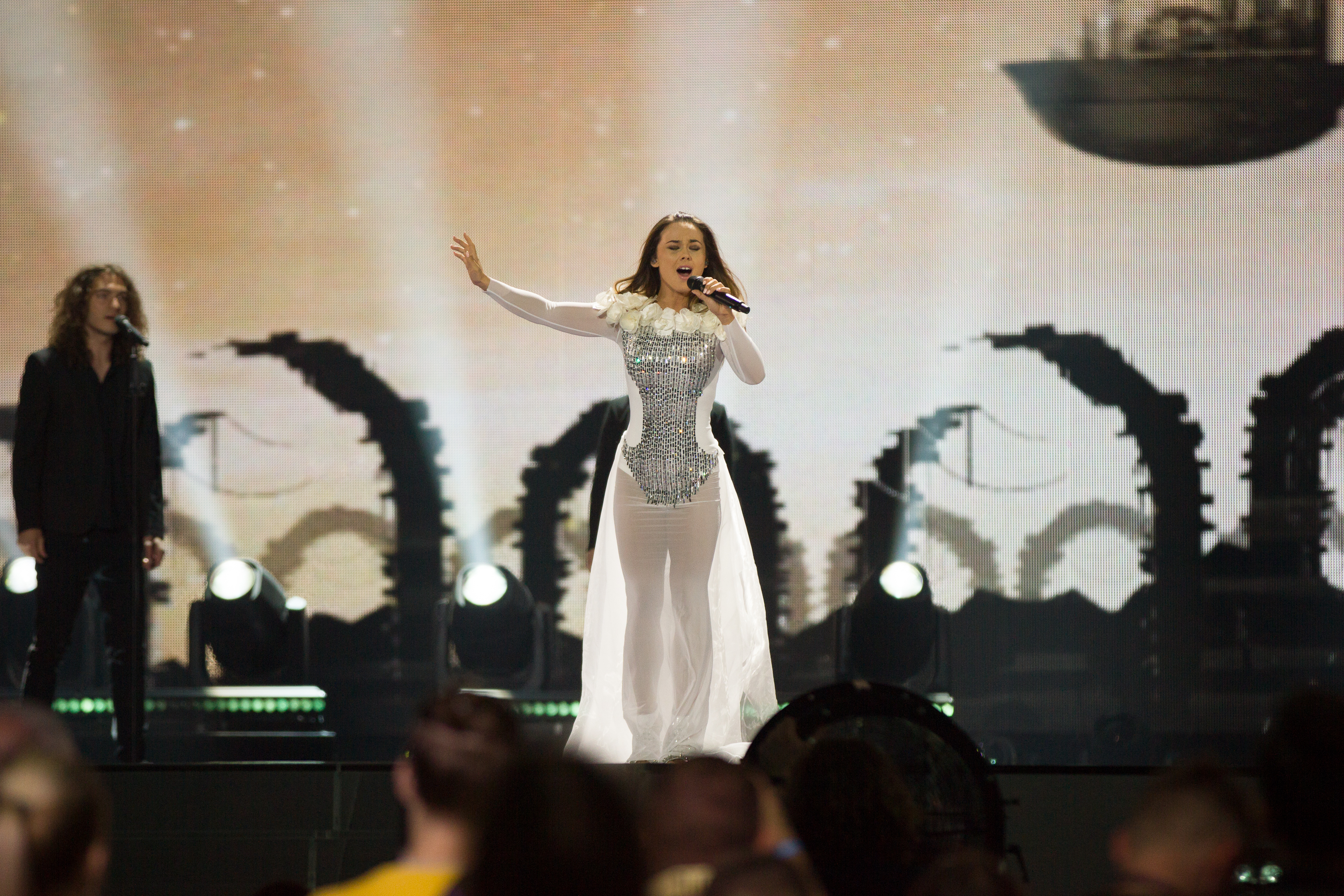
Lindita in Kyiv (2017)

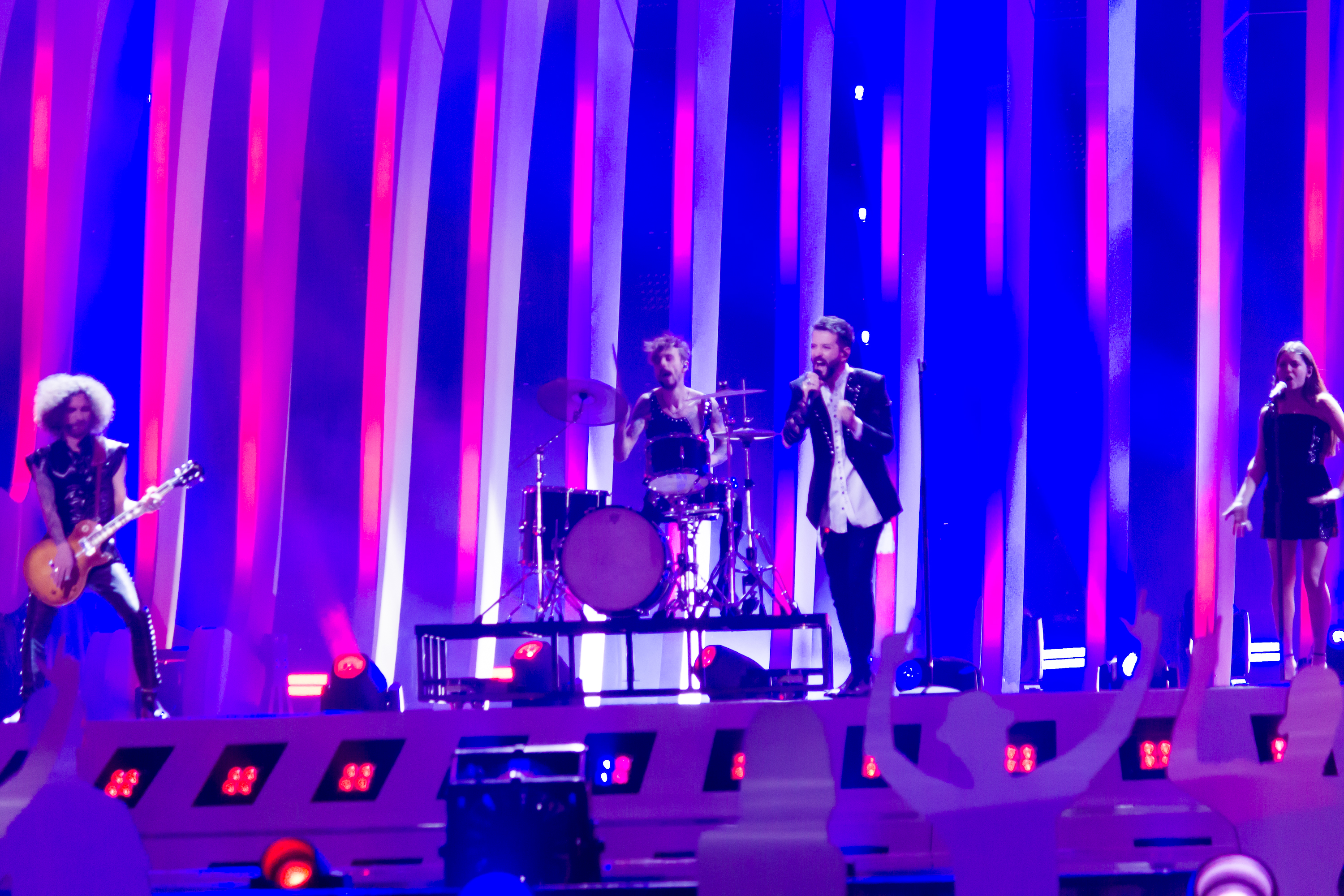
Eugent Bushpepa in Lisbon (2018)

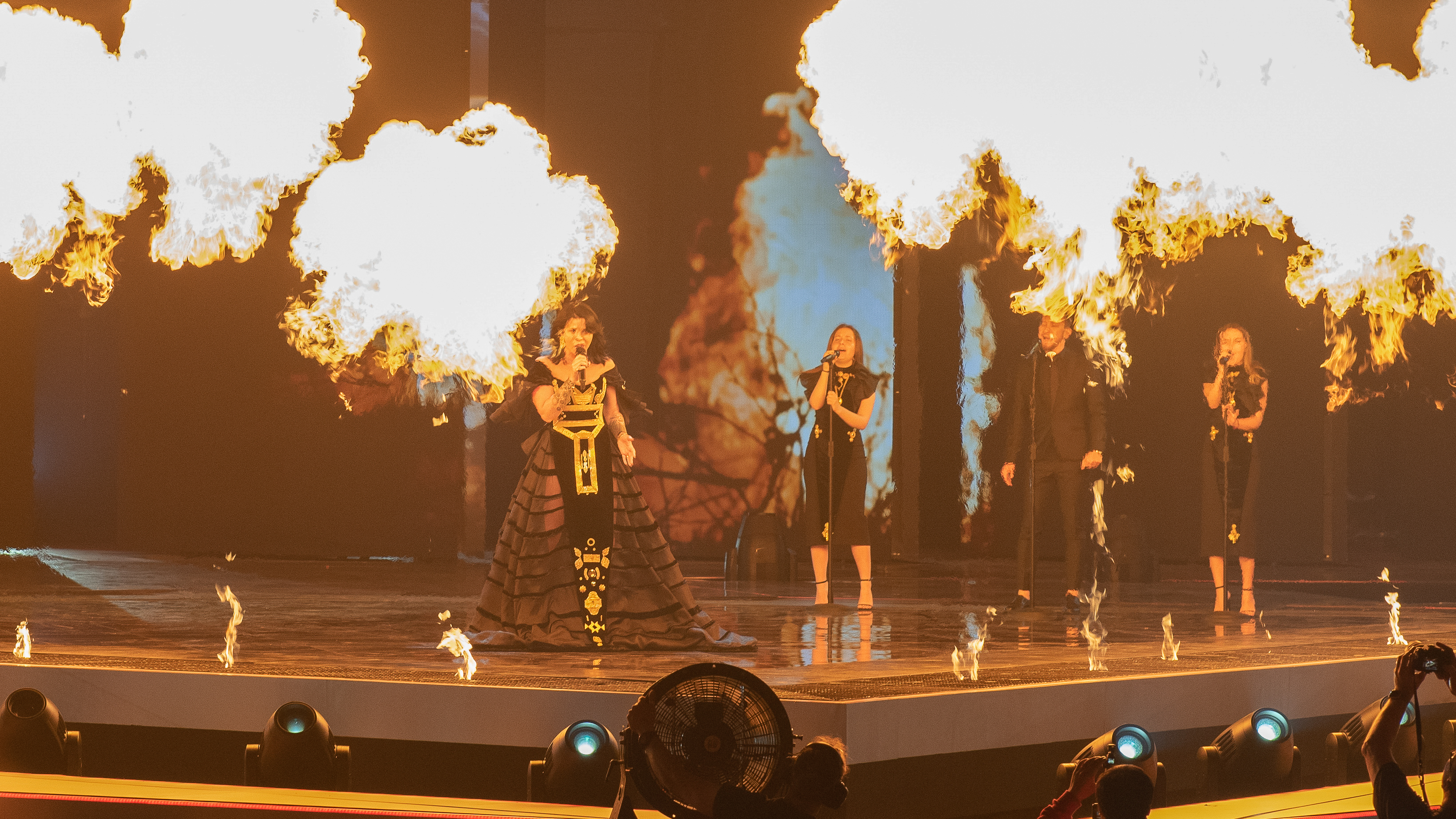
Jonida Maliqi in Tel Aviv (2019)

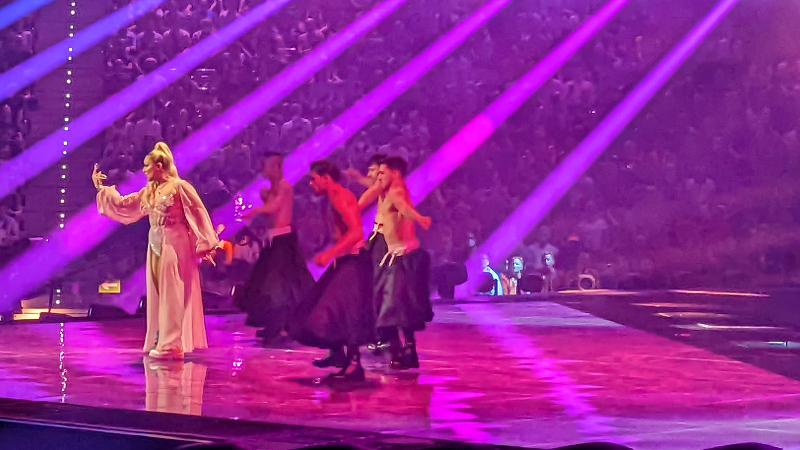
Ronela Hajati in Turin (2022)

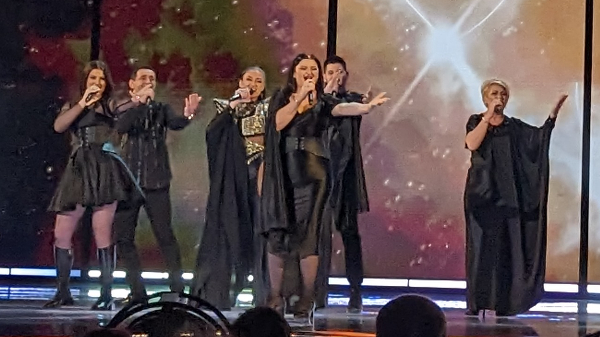
Albina and Familja Kelmendi in Liverpool (2023)

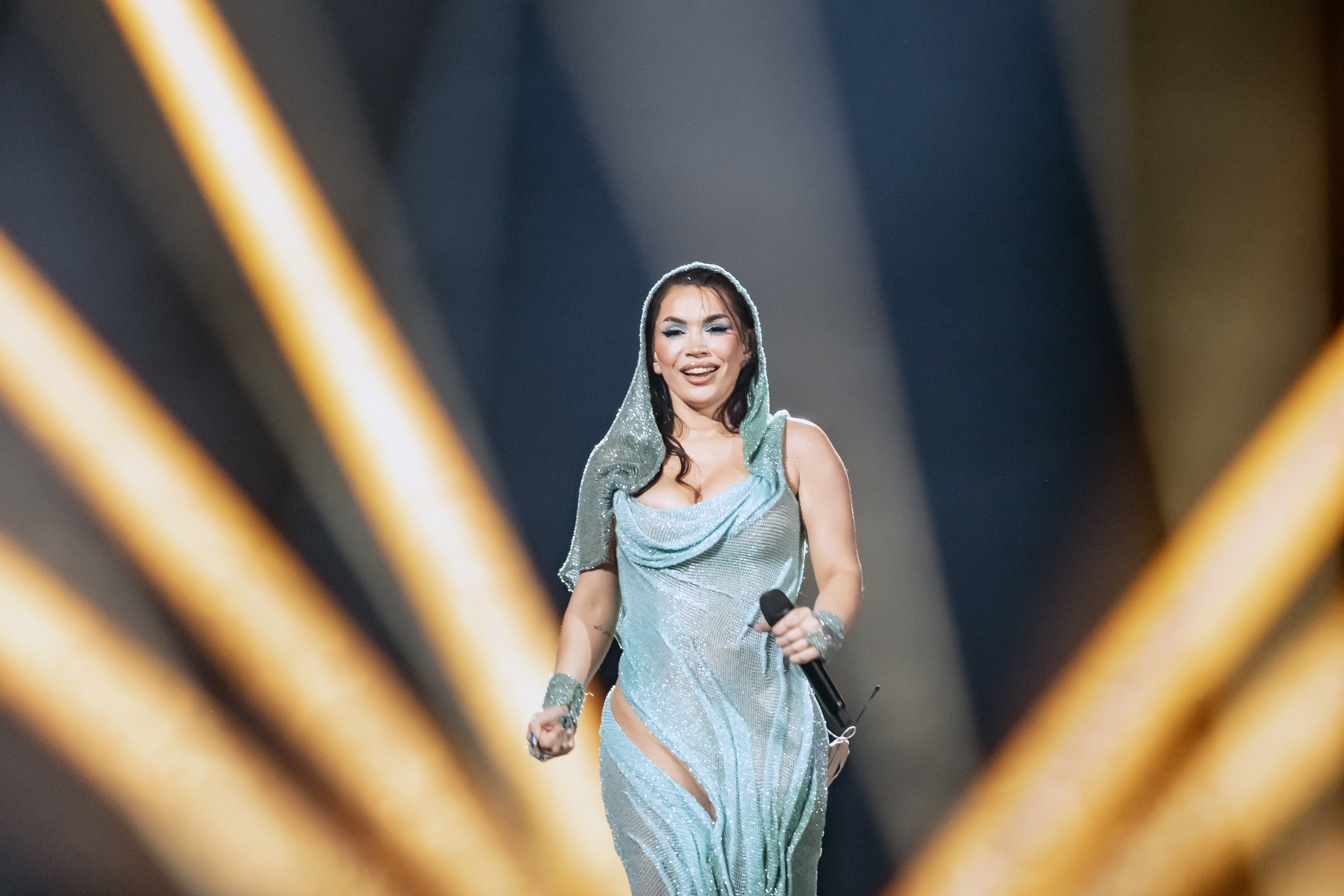
Besa in Malmö (2024)

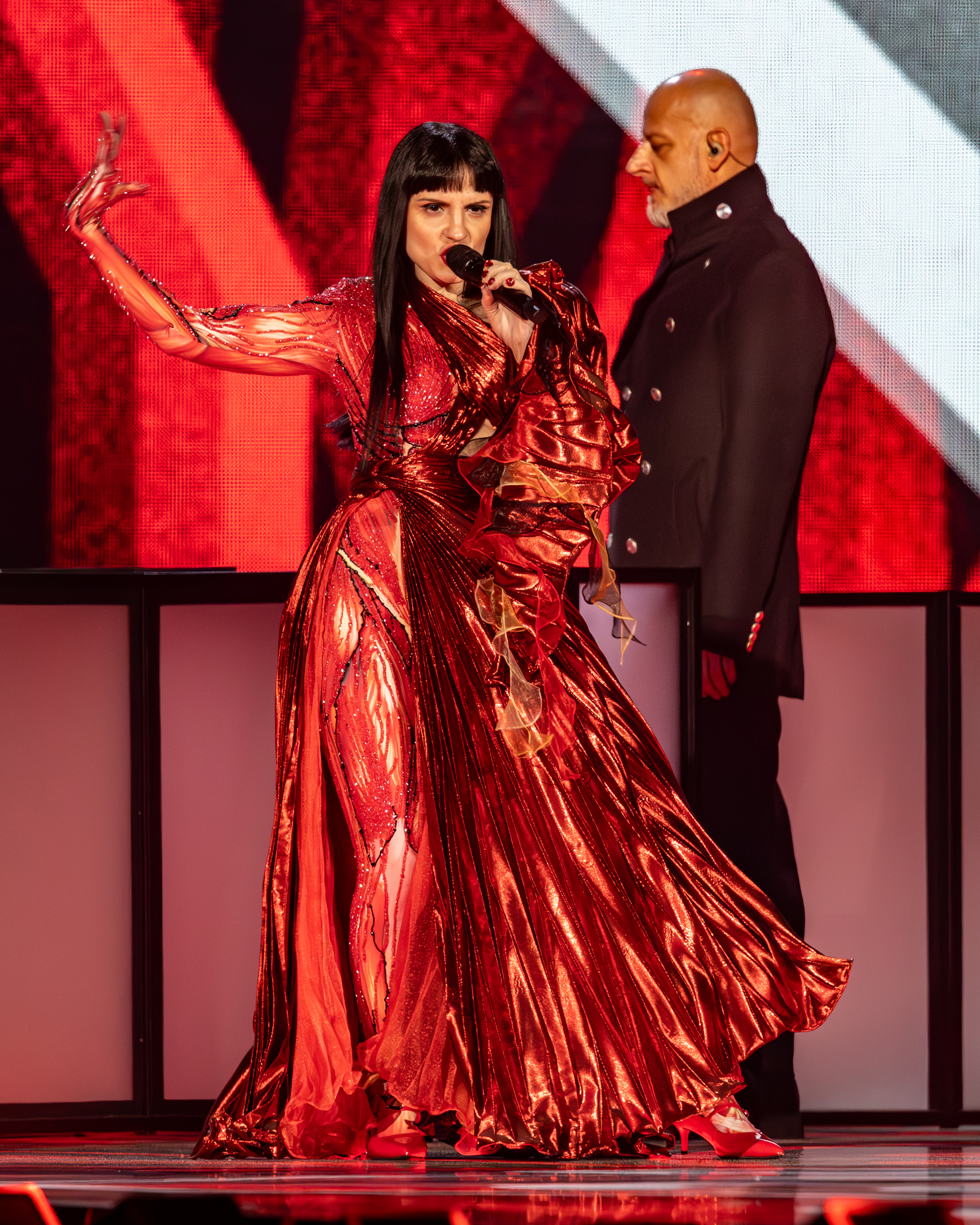
Shkodra Elektronike in Basel (2025)

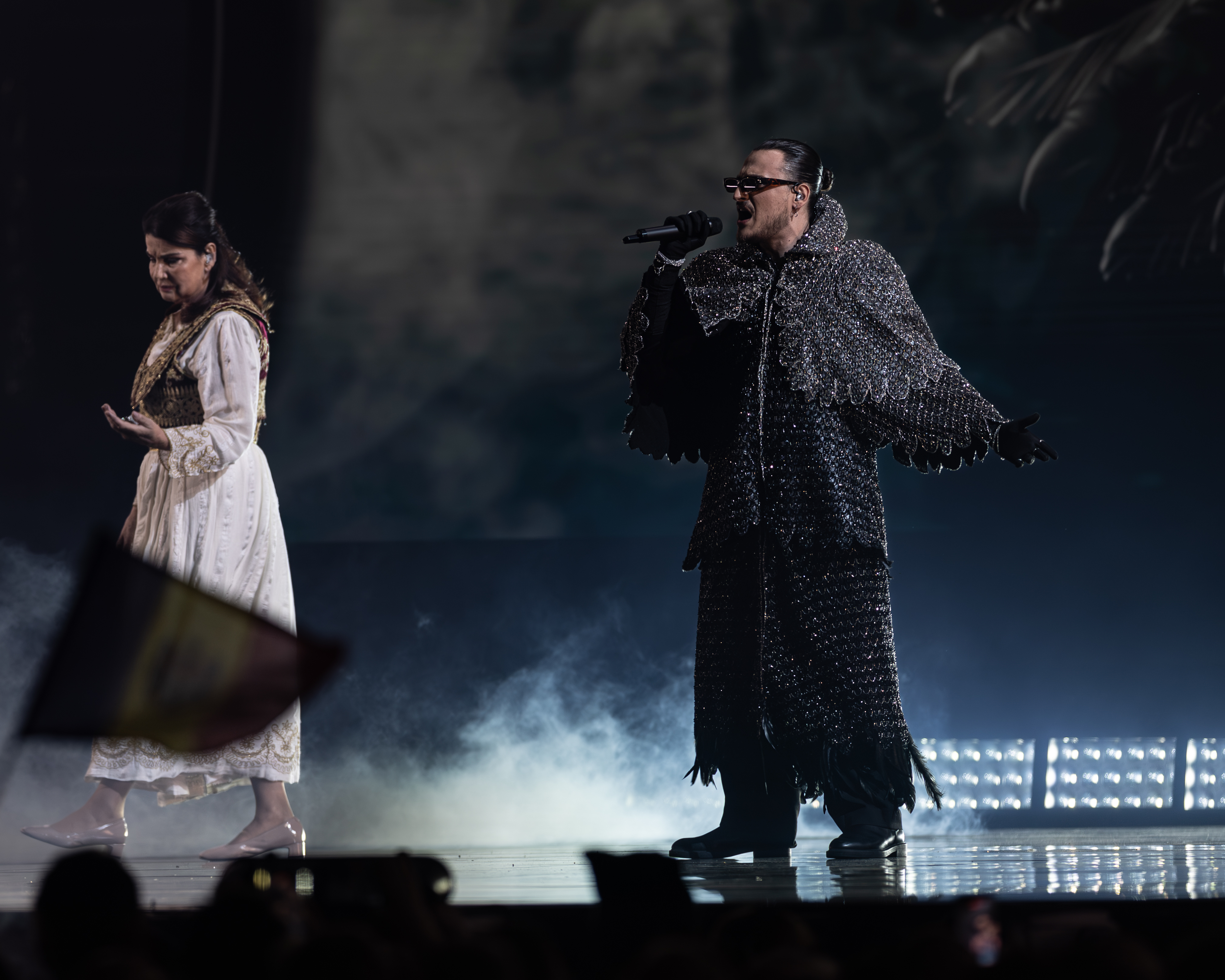
Alis in Vienna (2026)

== See also ==
- Albania in the Eurovision Young Dancers
- Albania in the Eurovision Young Musicians
- Albania in the Junior Eurovision Song Contest
