= Adrian Lulgjuraj =

Albanian singer from Montenegro (born 1980)

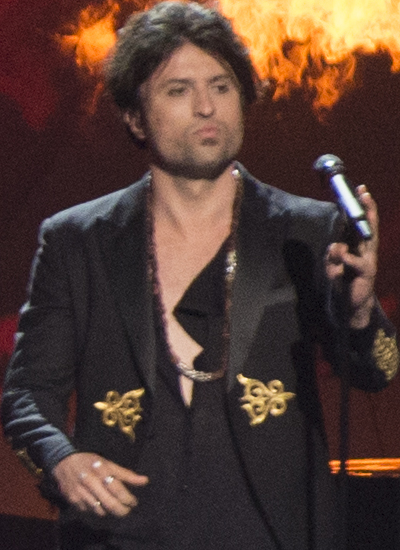
- Lulgjuraj at the Eurovision Song Contest 2013

Background information
- Also known as: Ad Lulgjuraj
- Born: August 19, 1980 (age 45); Ulcinj, SR Montenegro, SFR Yugoslavia (modern Montenegro)
- Genres: Rock
- Occupation: Singer/songwriter
- Spouse: Ana Pejović

Adrian Lulgjuraj^{[a]} (born 19 August 1980) is a Montenegrin-born Albanian singer. Together with Bledar Sejko, he represented Albania in the Eurovision Song Contest 2013 in Malmö with the song "Identitet". The song failed to qualify for the final.

== Biography ==
Lulgjuraj was born in the coastal city of Ulcinj (Albanian: Ulqin) to an Albanian family, the southernmost city of Montenegro. Although raised in an Albanian-majority city, Lulgjuraj was always involved in projects and festivals all over Montenegro. He is known for his charity work and the original genre in music. Lulgjuraj entered the Albanian music industry in early 2010, participating in various TV shows and music festivals such as Top Fest. He entered the competition twice, both times entering the finals, and receiving numerous awards. Lulgjuraj was also a helping-coach in The Voice of Albania, the Albanian version of The Voice of Holland.

== Private life ==
Adrian is married to Ana Pejović Lulgjuraj, former Miss Montenegro in 2000. They have 2 children.

== Discography ==
- 2012: "Identitet" (Identity) (feat. Bledar Sejko)
- 2012: "Evoloj" (Evolve)
- 2011: "Të mori një det" (You went away)

== Awards ==
Festivali i Këngës

Year	Nominee / work	Award	Result
2012	"Identitet (feat .Bledar Sejko )"	First Prize	Won

Top Fest

Year	Nominee / work	Award	Result
2012	"Evuloj"	Best Male	Won

== Notes ==
a.	Albanian: Adrian Lulgjuraj, Montenegrin: Adrijan Ljuljđuraj, Адријан Љуљђурај.

Awards and achievements
Preceded by Rona Nishliu with "Suus"	Albania in the Eurovision Song Contest; 2013	Succeeded by Hersi with "One Night's Anger"
