= Rona Nishliu =

Kosovo Albanian singer and songwriter (born 1986)

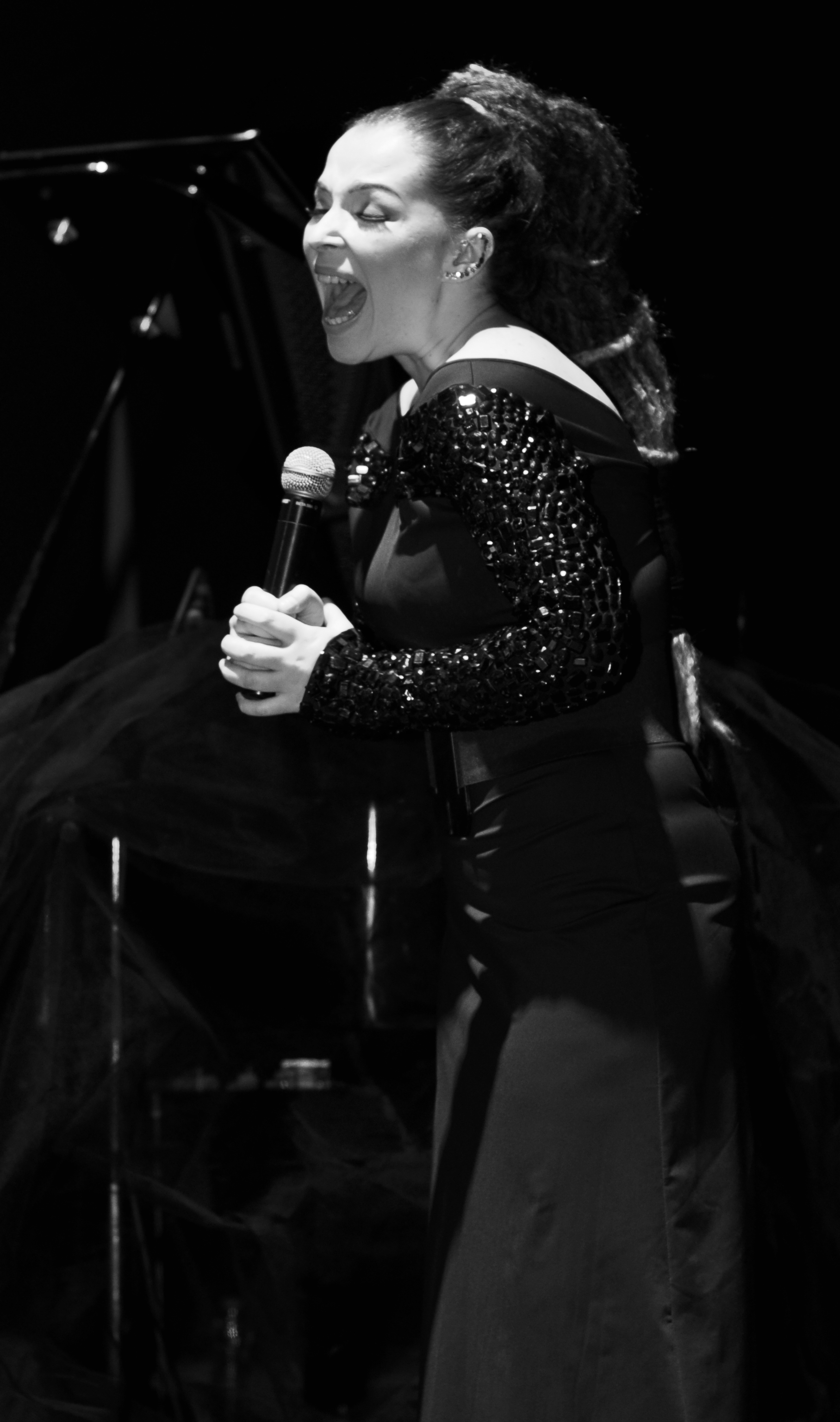
- Rona Nishliu performing at a jazz concert in Pristina, Kosovo

Background information
- Born: 25 August 1986 (age 40); Titova Mitrovica, SFR Yugoslavia (present-day Mitrovicë, Kosovo)
- Genres: Jazz; pop; soul
- Occupations: Singer; songwriter; radio personality; philanthropist
- Instrument: Vocals
- Years active: 2004–present

Rona Nishliu (born 25 August 1986) is a Kosovo Albanian singer and songwriter. She came to international prominence after representing Albania in the Eurovision Song Contest 2012, where she placed fifth and achieved the best placement for Albania to date.

== Early life and career ==
=== 2004–2012: Early life and beginnings ===
Rona Nishliu was raised in her birth town Mitrovica, but moved with her family to Pristina at the age of thirteen due to the political situation in her hometown. In 2004 she entered "Ethet e së premtës mbrëma" (Friday night's fevers), a similar show to Idols. She successfully passed the first rounds and entered the live shows, where she finished Top 5. After the show, she worked on Radio Blue Sky in Pristina as a presenter.

In 2004, Rona teamed up with Vesa Luma and Teuta Kurti to enter the 43rd edition of Festivali i Këngës, for a chance to represent Albania in the Eurovision Song Contest 2005 with "Flakareshë". The trio were qualified for the final night held on 18 December 2004 but lost to Ledina Çelo who was declared the winner.

=== Eurovision Song Contest 2012 ===
Nishliu represented Albania in the Eurovision Song Contest 2012 after winning the national selection on 29 December 2011 with the entry "Suus". She is the first singer from Kosovo to represent Albania in the contest. Because of the Qafa e Vishës bus tragedy, RTSH deferred the first semi-final by more than two hours on 22 May, resulting in low ratings during Nishliu's appearance. Albania used its jury votes to vote for the other 17 countries in the semi-final, and it used the jury votes again on 26 May. RTK also did not air highlights from the first semi-final due to the bus crash. She ended up winning fifth place in the final with 146 points; Albania's best result to date. She received Albanian citizenship on 12 January 2012.

=== 2013–present ===
Nishliu was committed to her humanitarian work immediately after Eurovision. She became a member of a project called "Bonu cool, mos bjer shpullë" (Be cool, don't slap!), a project that raises gender awareness. She released a song especially for this occasion called "Se vetëm zemra flet saktë" (Because only the heart speaks right) which speaks against adolescent gender violence, produced and penned by Rona herself. The song is part of a wide public awareness campaign led by the Kosovo Gender Studies Centre. It was supported and financed by the European Union.

On 18 September 2014, Rona Nishliu held a concert in Belgrade, Serbia to promote the Kosovar culture, part of the "Mirëdita, dobar dan" festival. She received a standing ovation from the public.

In 2017, she became a coach on the sixth series of The Voice of Albania.

== Public image ==
In Albania, Kosovo, Montenegro and North Macedonia, she is known as a pop singer/musician. The audience in Pristina and Tirana know her also as an experimental jazz singer. Her interpretation is characterized with nuances of soul music influences as well. Her vocal range and interpretative power are her strongest points.

=== Philanthropy ===
While a student, Nishliu organised a few humanitarian concerts, including one to help displaced Kosovo Albanian families of Mitrovica living in poverty. In 2009, she took place as a guest lecturer in UNDP Kosovo's activity on Awareness Raising on the Importance of Volunteerism for the Youngsters in Vushtrri. She is an activist for the National Association of Autism in Kosovo, as well as Chairperson of the Institute for Sustainability and Development of Youth in Kosovo.

== Discography ==
=== Singles ===
- "Flakareshë" (Slap) (with Vesa Luma and Teuta Kurti)
- "Të lashë" (I left you)
- "Shenja" (The sign)
- "Eja" (Come)
- "Veriu" (The north)
- "A ka arsye?" (Is there any reason?) (ft. Bim Bimma)
- "Shko pastro pas saj" (Go clean after her)
- "Zonja Vdekje" (Mrs. Death)
- "Suus"
- "Se vetëm zemra flet saktë" (Because only the heart speaks right)

== Awards and nominations ==
Kënga Magjike

Year	Nominee / work	Award	Result
2006	"Shenja"	TV Klan Prize	Won
2009	"Humbja"	Best Vocal	Won

Poli Fest Awards

Year	Nominee / work	Award	Result
2007	"Veriu"	First Prize	Won

Video Fest Awards

Year	Nominee / work	Award	Result
2008	"Shko pastro pas saj"	Best Pop	Nominated

Festivali i Këngës

Year	Nominee / work	Award	Result
2011	"Suus"	First Prize	Won
2011	"Suus"	Best Interpreter	Won

Eurovision Song Contest 2012

Year	Nominee / work	Award	Result
2012	"Suus"	Contestant	5th

Awards and achievements
Preceded by Aurela Gaçe with Kënga ime	Festivali i Këngës; Winner; 2011	Succeeded by Adrian Lulgjuraj and Bledar Sejko with Identitet
Preceded by Aurela Gaçe with Feel the Passion	Albania in the Eurovision Song Contest; 2012	Succeeded by Adrian Lulgjuraj and Bledar Sejko with Identitet
