= Identitet =

2013 song by Adrian Lulgjuraj and Bledar Sejko

Single by Adrian Lulgjuraj and Bledar Sejko
- Language: Albanian
- Released: 12 March 2013
- Studio: Kingside, Gnesta, Sweden
- Genre: Heavy rock
- Length: 3:01
- Label: Universal
- Composer: Bledar Sejko
- Lyricist: Eda Sejko

Music video
- "Identitet" on YouTube

Eurovision Song Contest 2013 entry
- Country: Albania
- Artists: Adrian Lulgjuraj and Bledar Sejko
- Language: Albanian
- Composer: Bledar Sejko
- Lyricist: Eda Sejko

Finals performance
- Semi-final result: 15th
- Semi-final points: 31

Entry chronology
- ◄ "Suus" (2012)
- "One Night's Anger" (2014) ►

"Identitet" (Albanian pronunciation: [idɛntitɛt]; transl. Identity) is a song by Albanian singers Adrian Lulgjuraj and Bledar Sejko. It was first released on 12 March 2013 as a music video release which was uploaded on the official YouTube channel of the Eurovision Song Contest, then it was released as a single as part of a CD compilation on 29 April 2013 by Universal Music. The Albanian-language folk-inspired heavy rock song was composed by Bledar Sejko and the lyrics were written by Eda Sejko.

The song represented Albania in the Eurovision Song Contest 2013 in Malmö, Sweden, after winning the country's pre-selection competition Festivali i Këngës. But, it failed to qualify for the grand final, as it was ranked in fifteenth place, thus marking the country's fourth non-qualification in the contest. During their rock and roll-themed show, the duo was accompanied by four instrumentalists and a variety of flashing red and orange colours displayed on the LED screens in the background.

== Background and composition ==
In 2012, Adrian Lulgjuraj and Bledar Sejko were among the contestants selected to compete in the 51st edition of Festivali i Këngës, a competition to determine Albania's participant for the Eurovision Song Contest 2013. As part of the competition's rules, the lyrics of the participating entries had to be in the Albanian language. They took part in the contest with the song "Identitet" written by Eda Sejko and composed by Bledar Sejko himself. For the purpose of their Eurovision Song Contest participation, the song was remastered and shortened at the Kingside Studios in Gnesta, Sweden.

Musically, "Identitet" is an Albanian-language folk-inspired heavy rock song, which lyrically discusses about the concepts of freedom, cohesion, brotherhood and identity. In an interview, Sejko stated that the song is inspired by Albanian folk music from the cultural regions of Tropojë and Çamëria. The rhythm of the tupan is borrowed from that of southern Albania, whereas the guitar work is borrowed from the sounds of northern Albania's çifteli. Meanwhile, the traditional southern Albanian iso-polyphony is remembered through the use of violins, whereas the northern Albanian call "hey" is also present in the chorus.

== Reception and plagiarism accusation ==
After winning Festivali i Këngës, the song received mixed reviews from music critics. In a Wiwibloggs review containing several reviews from individual critics, it was given a score of 2.86 out of 10 points. The reviewers negatively noted that the song was "old-fashioned" and anticipated that it could not qualify for the grand final of the Eurovision Song Contest. Although, various reviewers expressed praise towards the song's instrumental and folklore-inspired sound. "Identitet" was accused of plagiarising the Bajaga's "Plavi safir" from 1988 by different medias and websites throughout the Balkans, although music experts have reported that both "Identitet" and "Plavi Safir" are influenced by Balkan folk music, which is similar in many countries in the region. According to Bledar Sejko, the starting notes of "Plavi safir" were plagiarised from the lyrics of "Kur bie fyelli e çiftelia" by Albanian singer and songwriter Vaçe Zela from the middle of the 20th century.

== Promotion and release ==
For promotional purposes, the singers made various appearances to perform the song on different occasions, including in Amsterdam's Eurovision in Concert. The song was first released on 12 March 2013, when it premiered as a music video release on the official YouTube channel of the Eurovision Song Contest. The song was then issued as a single on 29 April 2013 as part of the Eurovision Song Contest: Malmö 2013 compilation album on CD through CMC Records and Universal Music. On 14 February 2018, it was released as a standalone download through Radio Televizioni Shqiptar (RTSH).

== At Eurovision ==
=== Festivali i Këngës ===
The national broadcaster of Albania, Radio Televizioni Shqiptar (RTSH), organised the 51st edition of Festivali i Këngës to determine the country's participants for the Eurovision Song Contest 2013 in Malmö, Sweden. It opened a submission period for artists and composers to submit their entries between 8 and 9 October 2012 to the competition. Following the grand final, Adrian Lulgjuraj & Bledar Sejko were chosen to represent the country in the contest after the votes of an expert jury were combined, resulting in 74 total points.

=== Malmö ===
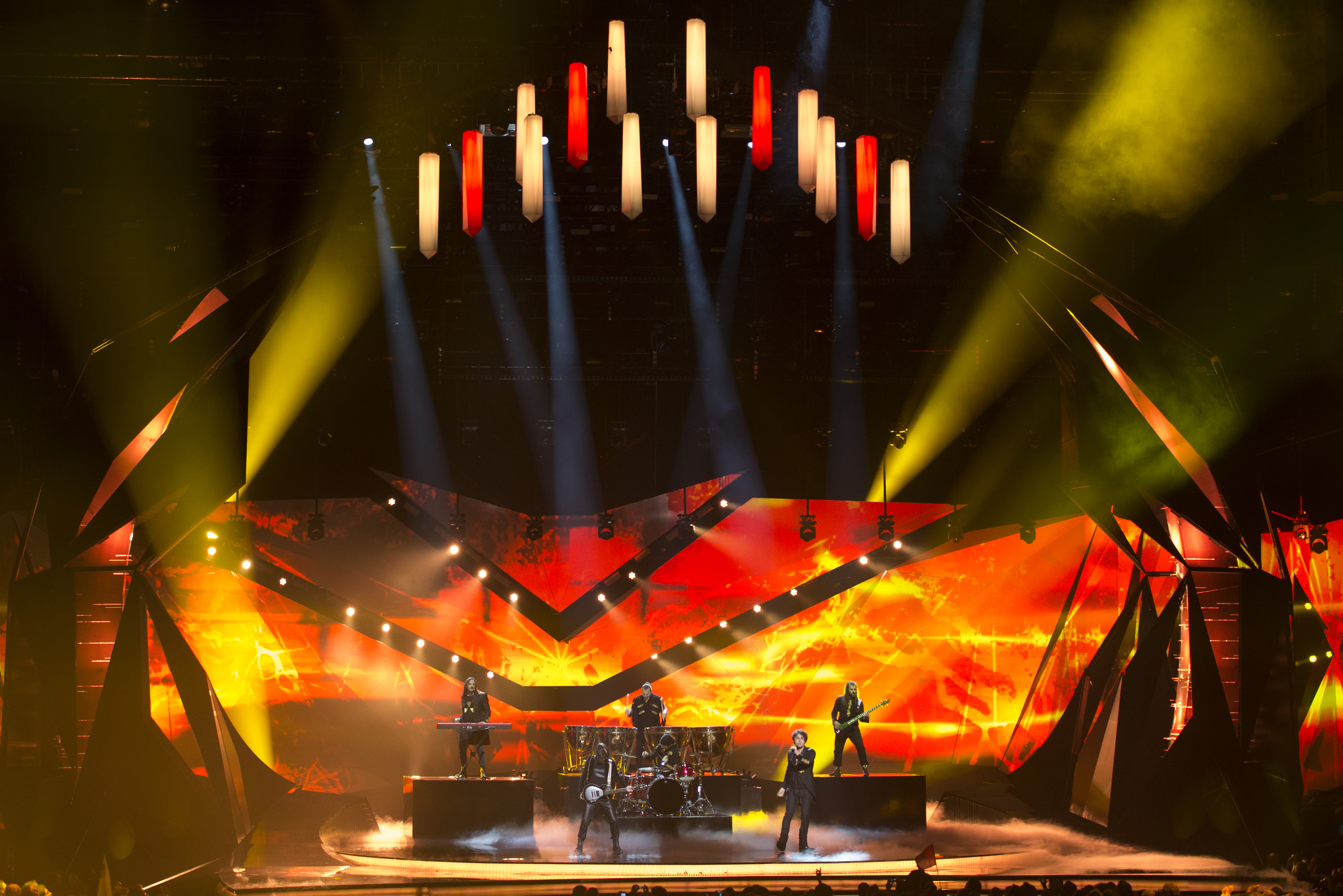
Adrian Lulgjuraj and Bledar Sejko performing during a rehearsal before the second semi-final.

The 58th edition of the Eurovision Song Contest took place in Malmö, Sweden, and consisted of two semi-finals held on 14 and 16 May, and the grand final on 18 May 2013. According to the Eurovision rules, each participating country (except the host country and the "Big Five", consisting of France, Germany, Italy, Spain and the United Kingdom) were required to qualify from one of the two semi-finals to compete for the grand final, although the top ten countries from the respective semi-finals progress to the grand final. On 17 January 2013, it was announced that "Identitet" would be performed in the second half of the second semi-final of the contest. During the live show, Albania performed fourteenth, following Norway and was preceding Georgia, and failed to qualify for the grand final in fifteenth place with 31 points, ranking twelfth by the jury's 11.78 points and fifteenth by the televote of 9.10 points.

Adrian Lulgjuraj and Bledar Sejko were accompanied by a drummer, bass guitarist, percussionist and keyboard player during their rock and roll-themed performance. Behind the singers, the LED screen displays flashing red, orange and white lights, while pyrotechnics and fog were also used throughout the performance.

== Track listing ==
- Digital download
1. "Identitet (Festivali i Këngës)" – 4:02

== Release history ==
Region	Date	Format	Label	Ref.
Various	29 April 2013	CD	CMC; Universal	
Various	14 February 2018	Digital download	Broken AL; RTSH	
