= Suus =

2012 song by Rona Nishliu

Single by Rona Nishliu
- Language: Albanian
- Released: 4 May 2012
- Studio: Ocean Way (Hollywood); Capitol (Hollywood)
- Length: 3:06
- Label: Universal
- Composer: Florent Boshnjaku
- Lyricist: Rona Nishliu

Music video
- "Suus" on YouTube

Eurovision Song Contest 2012 entry
- Country: Albania
- Artist: Rona Nishliu
- Language: Albanian
- Composer: Florent Boshnjaku
- Lyricist: Rona Nishliu

Finals performance
- Semi-final result: 2nd
- Semi-final points: 146
- Final result: 5th
- Final points: 146

Entry chronology
- ◄ "Feel the Passion" (2011)
- "Identitet" (2013) ►

"Suus" (Latin pronunciation: [ˈsʊ.ʊs]; transl. "His" [m.sg.]) is a song by Kosovo-Albanian singer and songwriter Rona Nishliu. It was released as part of a CD compilation on 4 May 2012 by Universal Music. The song was written by the singer herself and composed by Florent Boshnjaku. Musically, it is an Albanian-language folklore-inspired ballad, which lyrically addresses an emotional circumstance reflecting the moments that occurred in the past and the expectations of insecure tomorrows.

The song represented Albania in the Eurovision Song Contest 2012 after winning the country's pre-selection competition Festivali i Këngës. It reached the fifth place in a field of twenty-six, scoring a total of one hundred and forty six points and remaining the country's highest placement to date. During her minimalistic performance, Nishliu was performing alone in front of dark-coloured LED screens featuring red and white flashing lights in the background.

"Suus" received positive reviews from music critics upon its release, commending its authenticity and the singer's vocal delivery. An accompanying music video was premiered to the official YouTube channel of the Eurovision Song Contest on 17 March 2012. It visually amplifies the absurdity of life through an abstract art form simultaneously allowing the viewer to create a variety of interpretations. In 2012, the singer performed the song on multiple occasions in Cyprus, Hungary, Romania and the Netherlands.

== Background and composition ==
In 2011, Rona Nishliu was announced as one of the contestants selected to compete in the 50th edition of Festivali i Këngës, a competition to determine Albania's participant for the Eurovision Song Contest 2012. As part of the competition's rules, the lyrics of the participating entries had to be in the Albanian language. The singer took part with "Suus" written by Nishliu herself and composed by Florent Boshnjaku. For the purpose of the singer's Eurovision Song Contest participation, the song was remastered undergoing a few structural modifications at its intro, refrain and instrumentation. It was produced at the Ocean Way and Capitol Studios in Los Angeles, and mastered at the Sterling Sound Studios in New York.

Musically, the song is an Albanian-language folklore-inspired ballad. It lyrically addresses an emotional condition reflecting on the moments that occurred in the past and the expectations of unsure tomorrows. It focuses on Nishliu's personal experiences, with her stating in an interview that "it's about the difficult times everyone can have, but there is certainly a light at the end of the tunnel–only if you search for this light, you will find it". Veronika Pohl of Eurovision.de wrote "the pain of her own story seems to resonate in the song, as Nishliu had to leave her home city Mitrovica due to the Kosovo War in the 1999s".

== Critical reception ==
Upon its release, "Suus" was received with positive reviews by music critics. William Lee Adams of Huffington Post was skeptical when he first heard the song but upon realising that Nishliu was singing "Qaj" (Cry in English), he said that "it really drove home the point that "Suus" is a deeply emotional ballad". In a Wiwibloggs review containing several reviews from individual critics, including Deban Aderemi and William Lee Adams, praise was given towards Nishliu's voice and the song's authentic nature, while Aderemi concluded that it is as an "absolute masterpiece". Chris Zammarelli from Eurovision Lemurs similarly commended the singer's "powerful" vocal delivery. Keith Watson of Metro included Nishliu's performance in its list of "The 'real' winners of the Eurovision Song Contest" and found it "an emotive epic performance that displays her incredible vocal range".

== Promotion and release ==
An accompanying music video for the song was premiered on the official YouTube channel of the Eurovision Song Contest on 17 March 2012. Nishliu stated that "it's a poetic video" in which, according to her, through "its components [...] intends to depict this life's absurd through an abstract art form". She further said, "the beautiful thing is that everyone can give its meaning to it, so this video allows a variety of interpretations". The song was initially released on 4 May 2012 as part of the Eurovision Song Contest: Baku 2012 compilation album on CD through Universal Music. (Note: The exact date of the standalone release can not be determined precisely; ESCDaily indicates the year and medium, although it does not specify the date or country.) On 20 July 2016, it was made available for digital download through Radio Televizioni Shqiptar (RTSH).

For further promotion, the singer made various live performances and visited numerous countries, including Cyprus, Hungary, Montenegro, Romania and the Netherlands. While in quarantine during the pandemic of the coronavirus disease 2019 (COVID-19), footage of Ana Soklič, the representative of Slovenia for the Eurovision Song Contest 2020, covering the song was broadcast during the Eurovision Home Concerts on 24 April 2020. The song was featured in multiple lists of the Eurovision Top 250 charts from 2014 to 2018. Its highest position was at number 18 in 2014.

== At Eurovision ==
=== Festivali i Këngës ===
The Albanian national broadcaster, Radio Televizioni Shqiptar (RTSH), organised the 50th edition of Festivali i Këngës to determine the Albania's participant for the Eurovision Song Contest 2012 in Baku, Azerbaijan. It consisted of two semi-finals on 26 and 27 December, and the grand final on 29 December 2011. Following a submission period, a jury panel internally selected 28 songs to participate in the competition's semi-finals. Before the end of the grand final, Rona Nishliu was chosen to represent the country at the contest, after receiving a total of 77 points.

=== Eurovision ===
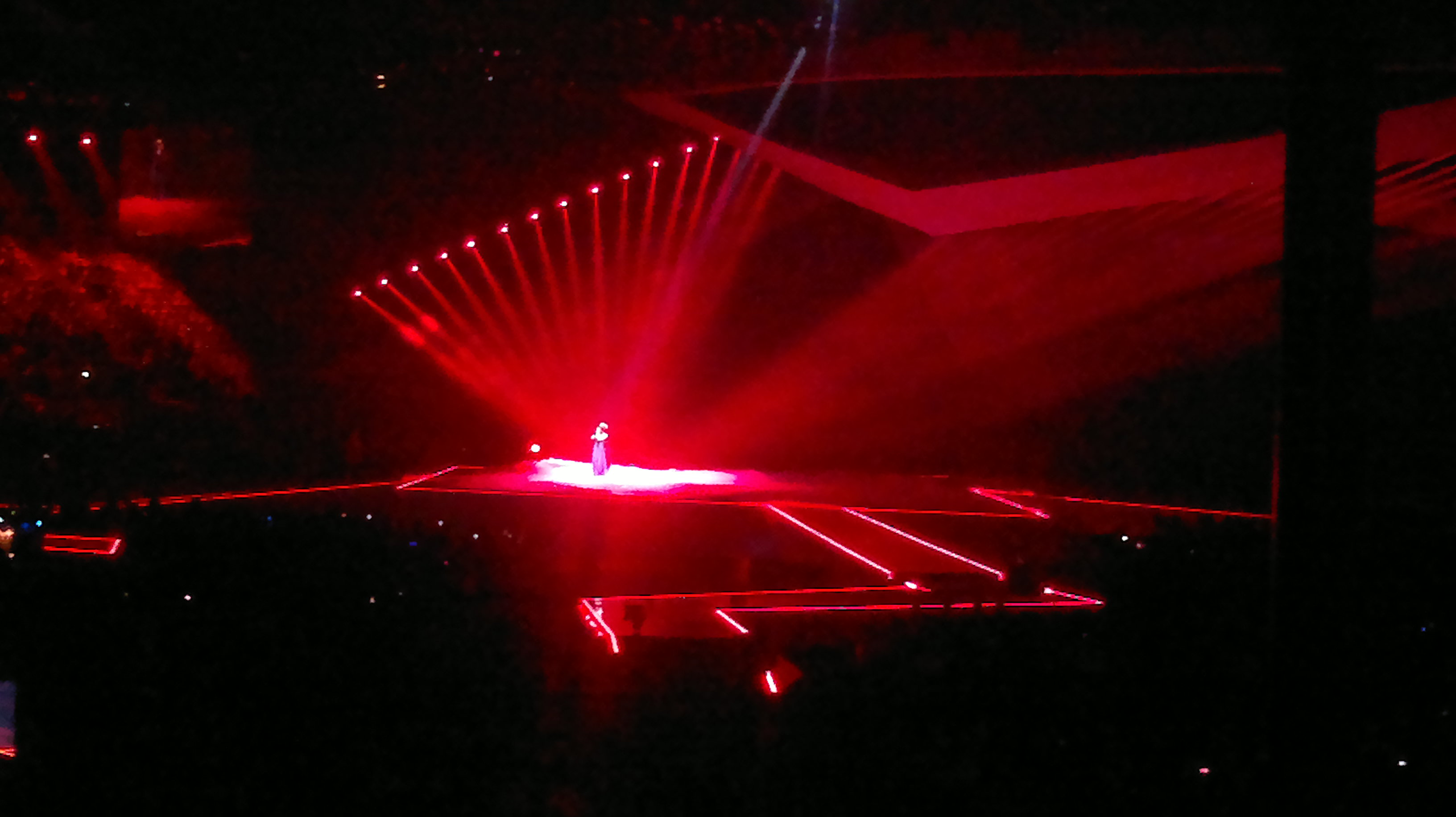
The red and black-themed performance of Rona Nishliu during the first semi-final in Baku.

The 57th edition of the Eurovision Song Contest took place in Baku, Azerbaijan, and consisted of two semi-finals on 22 and 24 May, and the grand final on 26 May 2012. According to the Eurovision rules, each participating country, except the host country and the "Big Five", consisting of France, Germany, Italy, Spain and the United Kingdom, were required to qualify from one of the two semi-finals to compete for the grand final, although, the top ten countries from the respective semi-final progress to the grand final. On 25 January 2012, it was announced that Albania would be performing in the first half of the first semi-final of the contest.

During the first semi-final, Albania performed fifth, following Latvia and preceding Romania, and qualified for the grand final in second place with 146 points, ranking first jury's votes with 131 points and third in the televote with 131 points. (Note: The votes from the jury and televoters, respectively, counted for 50%.) At the grand final, the country performed third, following Hungary and preceding Lithuania. Albania reached fifth place in a field of twenty six with 146 points, ranking third among juries with 157 and eighth in the televote with 106 points. To this day, it is Albania's best result in the contest.

Nishliu's show saw her performing the song alone in front of a predominantly dark setting displayed on the LED screens in the background. Throughout the show, several red spotlights were added and black and white silhouettes appeared throughout the middle of her performance. A minimalistic setting was used to strengthen the message of the song and to keep the focus on the vocals and the orchestration.

== Track listing ==
- Digital download
1. "Suus (Festivali i Këngës)" – 4:14

== Release history ==
Region	Date	Format	Label	Ref.
Various	20 July 2016	Digital download	Broken AL; RTSH	
