= Albania in the Eurovision Song Contest 2007 =

- Eurovision Song Contest 2007
- Participating broadcaster: Radio Televizioni Shqiptar (RTSH)
- Country: Albania
- Selection process: Festivali i Këngës 45
- Selection date: 23 December 2006

Competing entry
- Song: "Hear My Plea"
- Artist: Frederik Ndoci
- Songwriters: Adrian Hila; Pandi Laço

Placement
- Semi-final result: Failed to qualify (17th)

Participation chronology

Albania was represented at the Eurovision Song Contest 2007 with the song "Hear My Plea", composed by Adrian Hila, with lyrics by Pandi Laço, and performed by Frederik Ndoci and Aida Ndoci. The Albanian participating broadcaster, Radio Televizioni Shqiptar (RTSH), selected its entry through the national selection competition Festivali i Këngës in December 2006.

To this point, the nation had participated in the Eurovision Song Contest three times since its first entry in 2004. Due to the non-top 11 result in the previous contest, Albania was drawn to compete in the semi-final of the contest, which took place on 10 May 2007. Performing as number 11, the nation was not announced among the top 10 entries of the semi-final and therefore failed to qualify for the grand final, marking Albania's second non-qualification in the contest.

== Background ==
Prior to the 2007 contest, Radio Televizioni Shqiptar (RTSH) had participated in the Eurovision Song Contest representing Albania three times since its first entry in 2004. Its highest placing in the contest, to this point, had been the seventh place, achieved in 2004 with the song "The Image of You" performed by Anjeza Shahini.

As part of its duties as participating broadcaster, RTSH organises the selection of its entry in the Eurovision Song Contest and broadcasts the event in the country. RTSH has organised Festivali i Këngës since its inauguration in 1962. Since 2003, the winner of the competition has simultaneously won the right to represent Albania in the Eurovision Song Contest.

== Before Eurovision ==
=== Festivali i Këngës ===
RTSH organised the 45th edition of Festivali i Këngës to determine its entry for the Eurovision Song Contest 2007. The competition consisted of two semi-finals on 21 and 22 December, respectively, and the grand final on 23 December 2006. The three live shows were hosted by Albanian presenter Adi Krasta, actress Ermela Teli and singer Vesa Luma.

==== Competing entries ====
Competing entries
| Artist | Song |
|---|---|
| Alban Skënderaj | "Eklips" |
| Albërie Hadergjonaj | "Të dua zemër ty të dua" |
| Amarda Arkaxhiu | "Por ti mos trego" |
| Andi Kongo | "Siluetë" |
| Arbër Arapi | "Në fund të botës" |
| Besiana Mehmeti and Mustafa Ymeri | "Kepi i shpreses se mirë" |
| Edmond Mancaku | "Ne apo kjo kohë" |
| Eliza Hoxha | "Hajde sonte" |
| Erion Korini | "Falja do shpirt" |
| Ervin Bushati | "Hajde" |
| Evans Rama | "Nata e fundit" |
| Evis Mula | "Rrëfim në mesnatë" |
| Frederik Ndoci and Aida Ndoci | "Balada e gurit" |
| Greta Koçi | "Eja zemër" |
| Greta Tafa | "Blozë e bardhë" |
| Hersiana Matmuja | "Ah jetë, o jetë!" |
| Joe Artid Fejzo | "Vallë përse?" |
| Jonida Maliqi | "Pa identitet" |
| Kujtim Prodani | "Kjo është jeta" |
| Mariza Ikonomi | "Ku është dashuria" |
| Mateus Frroku | "Trill i një natë" |
| Rosela Gjylbegu | "Pa ty, pa mua" |
| Rovena Stefa | "Ti më do" |
| Saimir Braho | "Mik i dhimbjes" |
| Saimir Çili | "Të jetosh!?" |
| Samanta Karavello | "Ylli im polar" |
| Sfinks | "Mos perëndo" |
| Silva Gunbardhi | "Dua të jem" |
| Sonila Mara | "Do të shkruaj një letër" |
| Tonin Marku | "Ëndrra ime" |
| Voltan Prodani and Alfred Habibi | "Jemi kaq të largët" |

==== Shows ====
===== Semi-finals =====
The semi-finals of Festivali i Këngës took place on 21 December and 22 December 2006, respectively. 15 contestants participated in the first semi-final and 16 in the second, with the highlighted ones progressing to the grand final.

Semi-final 1 – 21 December 2006
| R/O | Artist | Song | Result |
|---|---|---|---|
| 1 | Kujtim Prodani | "Kjo është jeta" | Qualified |
| 2 | Ervin Bushati | "Hajde" | —N/a |
| 3 | Sonila Mara | "Do të shkruaj një letër" | —N/a |
| 4 | Arbër Arapi | "Në fund të botës" | Qualified |
| 5 | Hersiana Matmuja | "Ah jetë, o jetë!" | Qualified |
| 6 | Saimir Çili | "Të jetosh!?" | —N/a |
| 7 | Saimir Braho | "Mik i dhimbjes" | Qualified |
| 8 | Amarda Arkaxhiu | "Por ti mos trego" | Qualified |
| 9 | Joe Artid Fejzo | "Vallë përse?" | —N/a |
| 10 | Rovena Stefa | "Ti më do" | —N/a |
| 11 | Erion Korini | "Falja do shpirt" | —N/a |
| 12 | Andi Kongo | "Siluetë" | —N/a |
| 13 | Frederik Ndoci and Aida Ndoci | "Balada e gurit" | Qualified |
| 14 | Sfinks | "Mos perëndo" | —N/a |
| 15 | Mariza Ikonomi | "Ku është dashuria" | Qualified |

Semi-final 2 – 22 December 2006
| R/O | Artist | Song | Result |
|---|---|---|---|
| 1 | Edmond Mancaku | "Ne apo kjo kohë" | —N/a |
| 2 | Silva Gunbardhi | "Dua të jem" | —N/a |
| 3 | Besiana Mehmeti and Mustafa Ymeri | "Kepi i shpreses se mirë" | Qualified |
| 4 | Greta Tafa | "Blozë e bardhë" | —N/a |
| 5 | Samanta Karavello | "Ylli im polar" | —N/a |
| 6 | Evans Rama | "Nata e fundit" | —N/a |
| 7 | Alban Skënderaj | "Eklips" | Qualified |
| 8 | Eliza Hoxha | "Hajde sonte" | Qualified |
| 9 | Greta Koçi | "Eja zemër" | Qualified |
| 10 | Tonin Marku | "Ëndrra ime" | Qualified |
| 11 | Rosela Gjylbegu | "Pa ty, pa mua" | Qualified |
| 12 | Mateus Frroku | "Trill i një natë" | —N/a |
| 13 | Evis Mula | "Rrëfim në mesnatë" | Qualified |
| 14 | Jonida Maliqi | "Pa identitet" | Qualified |
| 15 | Voltan Prodani and Alfred Habibi | "Jemi kaq të largët" | —N/a |
| 16 | Albërie Hadergjonaj | "Të dua zemër ty të dua" | Qualified |

===== Final =====
The grand final of Festivali i Këngës took place on 23 December 2006 and was broadcast at 21:00 (CET). "Balada e gurit" performed by Frederik Ndoci and Aida Ndoci emerged as the winner and was simultaneously announced as representing Albania in the Eurovision Song Contest 2007.

Final–23 December 2006
| R/O | Artist(s) | Song | Points | Result |
|---|---|---|---|---|
| 1 | Albërie Hadërgjonaj | "Të dua zemër ty të dua" | 10 | 11 |
| 2 | Hersiana Matmuja | "Ah jetë, oh jetë" | 11 | 10 |
| 3 | Mariza Ikonomi | "Ku është dashuria" | 49 | 3 |
| 4 | Arbër Arapi | "Në fund të botës" | 14 | 9 |
| 5 | Alban Skënderaj | "Eklips" | 37 | 7 |
| 6 | Eliza Hoxha | "Hajde sonte" | 10 | 12 |
| 7 | Amarda Arkaxhiu | "Por ti mos trego" | 48 | 4 |
| 8 | Evis Mula | "Rrëfim në mesnatë" | 39 | 6 |
| 9 | Greta Koçi | "Eja zemër" | 40 | 5 |
| 10 | Kujtim Prodani | "Kjo është jeta" | 4 | 14 |
| 11 | Jonida Maliqi | "Pa identitet" | 21 | 8 |
| 12 | Rosela Gjylbegu | "Pa ty, pa mua" | 52 | 2 |
| 13 | Saimir Braho | "Mik i dhimbjes" | 6 | 13 |
| 14 | Besiana Mehmeti and Mustafa Ymeri | "Kepi i shpresës së mirë" | 3 | 15 |
| 15 | Frederik Ndoci and Aida Ndoci | "Balada e gurit" | 55 | 1 |
| 16 | Tonin Marku | "Ëndrra ime" | 0 | 16 |

== At Eurovision ==
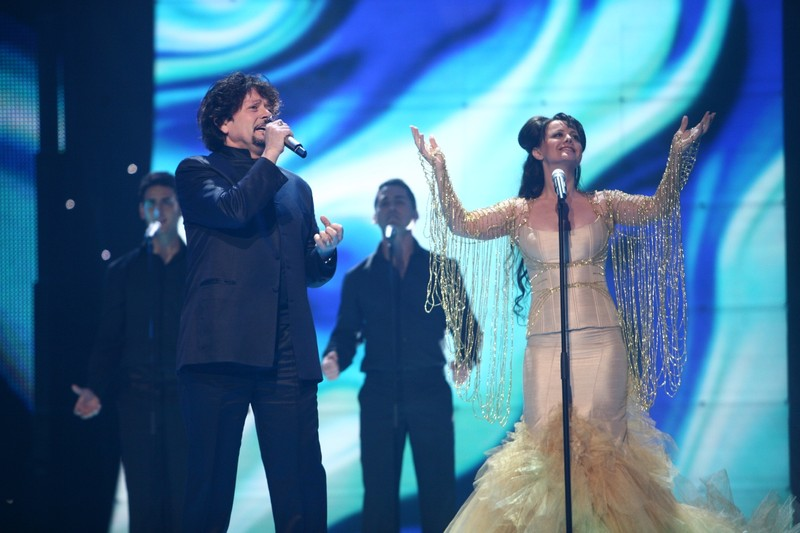
Frederik and Aida Ndoci performing during the Eurovision 2007 semi-final

The Eurovision Song Contest 2007 took place at Hartwall Arena in Helsinki, Finland, and consisted of a semi-final on 10 May and the grand final on 12 May 2007. According to the Eurovision rules, all participating countries, except the host nation and the "Big Four", consisting of France, Germany, Spain, and the United Kingdom, were required to qualify from the semi-final to compete for the final, although the top 10 countries from the semi-final progress to the final. Due to its non-top 11 result in the 2006 contest, Albania was required to compete in the semi-final. It was set to perform at position 11, following the Netherlands and preceding Denmark. At the end of the semi-final, the country was not announced among the top 10 entries and therefore failed to qualify for the final, marking Albania's second non-qualification in the Eurovision Song Contest.

=== Voting ===
In 2005, the EBU introduced an undisclosed threshold number of televotes that would have to be registered in each voting country in order to make that country's votes valid. If that number was not reached, the country's backup jury would vote instead. In both the semi-final and final of the contest, this affected two countries: one of them being Albania, who therefore had to use a backup jury panel to calculate its results. This jury judged each entry based on: vocal capacity; the stage performance; the song's composition and originality; and the overall impression of the act. In addition, no member of a national jury was permitted to be related in any way to any of the competing acts in such a way that they cannot vote impartially and independently.

The tables below visualise a breakdown of points awarded to Albania in the semi-final of the Eurovision Song Contest 2007, as well as by the country for the semi-final and grand final, respectively. In the semi-final, Albania finished in 17th place, being awarded a total of 49 points, including 10 from Macedonia and 8 from Greece. The nation awarded its 12 points to Turkey in the semi-final and to Spain in the grand final of the contest.

==== Points awarded to Albania ====
Points awarded to Albania (Semi-final)
| Score | Country |
|---|---|
| 12 points | |
| 10 points | Macedonia |
| 8 points | Greece |
| 7 points | Switzerland |
| 6 points | Montenegro |
| 5 points | |
| 4 points | Bosnia and Herzegovina; Turkey |
| 3 points | Austria; Croatia |
| 2 points | Bulgaria |
| 1 point | Germany; United Kingdom |

==== Points awarded by Albania ====
Points awarded by Albania (Semi-final)
| Score | Country |
|---|---|
| 12 points | Turkey |
| 10 points | Macedonia |
| 8 points | Cyprus |
| 7 points | Montenegro |
| 6 points | Malta |
| 5 points | Hungary |
| 4 points | Belarus |
| 3 points | Croatia |
| 2 points | Serbia |
| 1 point | Bulgaria |

Points awarded by Albania (Final)
| Score | Country |
|---|---|
| 12 points | Spain |
| 10 points | Turkey |
| 8 points | Bosnia and Herzegovina |
| 7 points | Greece |
| 6 points | Germany |
| 5 points | Ireland |
| 4 points | France |
| 3 points | Macedonia |
| 2 points | Belarus |
| 1 point | Serbia |
