= Albania in the Eurovision Song Contest 2005 =

- Eurovision Song Contest 2005
- Participating broadcaster: Radio Televizioni Shqiptar (RTSH)
- Country: Albania
- Selection process: Festivali i Këngës 43
- Selection date: 18 December 2004

Competing entry
- Song: "Tomorrow I Go"
- Artist: Ledina Çelo
- Songwriters: Adrian Hila; Pandi Laço

Placement
- Final result: 16th, 53 points

Participation chronology

Albania was represented at the Eurovision Song Contest 2005 with the song "Tomorrow I Go", composed by Adrian Hila, with lyrics by Pandi Laço, and performed by Ledina Çelo. The Albanian participating broadcaster, Radio Televizioni Shqiptar (RTSH), selected its entry through the national selection competition Festivali i Këngës in December 2004. This marked the second time that Albania participated in the contest since its debut in 2004. Due to the top 10 result in the previous contest, the nation automatically qualified for the grand final, which took place on 21 May 2005. In the final, it performed as number eight and placed 16th out of the 24 participating countries, scoring 53 points.

== Background ==
The European Broadcasting Union (EBU) announced in 2003 that Albania would debut at the Eurovision Song Contest 2004. Therefore, Radio Televizioni Shqiptar (RTSH) chose the annual competition Festivali i Këngës as the selection method to determine its entry for the contest. Its first entry was the song "The Image of You" performed by Anjeza Shahini which finished in seventh place in 2004.

== Before Eurovision ==
=== Festivali i Këngës ===
RTSH organised the 43rd edition of Festivali i Këngës to determine its representative for the Eurovision Song Contest 2005. The competition consisted of two semi-finals on 16 and 17 December, respectively, and the grand final on 18 December 2004. The three live shows were hosted by Albanian-Sudanese singer Hueyda El Sayed and presenter Leon Menkshi. Guest performances were featured by Anjeza Shahini (who represented Albania in 2004), Luca Barbarossa (who represented Italy in 1988), and Ruslana (who won Eurovision for Ukraine in 2004).

==== Competing entries ====
Participants
Artist(s)	Song	Composer
Agim Poshka	"Të kam, s'të kam"	Agim Poshka
Aleksia Jani	"Zotit"	Aleksia Jani
Aurel Thëllimi	"Erë e marrë"	Erion Sheme
Barbana Dini	"Jeta këtu s'mbaron"	Bardbyl Hysa
Besiana Mehmedi	"Grafitë dashurie"	Nexhat Mujovi
Çlirim Denaj	"Ti ike"	Çlirim Denaj
Elsida Sinaj	"Harresë kujtimesh"	Roland Guli
Stela Risto	"Vështirë të flas, vështirë të puth"	Agron Xhunga
Floriana Muça	"Përtej dashurisë"	Mark Luli
Ingrid Jushi	"Vetëm një natë"	Falmur Shebu
Joe Artid Fejzo	"Me ty"	Joe Artid Fejzo
Jonida Maliqi	"Frikem se më pëlqen"	Adrian Hila
Julian Lekoçaj	"Do të fal"	Julian Lebkoçaj
Klajdi Musabelli	"Puthjen nuk ta kam harruar"	Vladimir Kotani
Kozma Dushi and Ermira Kola	"Të bashkëjetoj më ty"	Petrit Terkuçi
Kujtim Prodani	"Jetën ndryshe e shikoj"	Kujtim Prodani
Ledina Çelo	"Nesër shkoj"	Adrian Hila
Luiz Ejlli	"Hëna dhe yjet dashurojnë"	Shpetim Saraci
Mariza Ikonomi	"Kur dashuron"	Edmond Zhulali
Marsida Saraçi	"Më duaj gjatë"	Edmond Rrapi
Monika Trungu	"Ti më bën të pasur"	Gazmend Mullhi
Olsa Spata	"Pritje"	Spartak Tili
Redon Makashi	"Ndjej"	Redon Makashi
Rosela Gjylbegu and Arbër Arapi	"Pëshpëritje zemrash"	Shpetim Saraçi
Rovena Stefa	"Kthehem prap"	Alfred Kaçinari
Saimir Çili	"Ëndërr e gjallë"	Saimir Çili
Saimir Braho and Enkela Braho	"Përpara se ti të vish në këtë botë"	Saimir Braho
Samanta Karavella	"Buzëqeshja"	Valentin Veizi
Shpat Kasapi	"Jam, kam të fal"	Gramoz Kozeli
Soni Malaj	"Eja ne Ballkan"	Shefqet Hoxha
Tergita Gusta	"Me ty, pa ty"	Endri Sina
Vesa Luma, Teuta Kurti and Rona Nishliu	"Flakaresh"	Armend Rexhepagiq

==== Shows ====
===== Semi-finals =====
The semi-finals of Festivali i Këngës took place on 16 December and 17 December 2004, respectively. 16 contestants participated in each semi-final, with the highlighted ones progressing to the grand final.

Semi-final 1 – 16 December 2004
R/O	Artist(s)	Song	Result
1	Marsida Saraçi	"Më duaj gjatë"	Qualified
2	Julian Lekoçaj	"Do të fal"	Qualified
3	Stela Risto	"Vështirë të flas, vështirë të puth"	—N/a
4	Aleksia Jani	"Zotit"	—N/a
5	Soni	"Eja në ballkan"	—N/a
6	Aurel Thëllimi	"Erë e marrë"	—N/a
7	Rovena Stefa	"Kthehem prapë"	Qualified
8	Floriana Muça	"Përtej dashurisë"	—N/a
9	Vesa Luma, Teuta Kurti and Rona Nishliu	"Flakareshë"	Qualified
10	Joe Artid Fejzo	"Me ty"	Qualified
11	Besiana Mehmeti	"Grafitë dashurie"	—N/a
12	Mariza Ikonomi	"Kur dashuron"	Qualified
13	Klajdi Musabelliu	"Puthjen nuk ta kam harruar"	Qualified
14	Jonida Maliqi	"Frikem se më pëlqen"	Qualified
15	Agim Poshka	"Të kam, s’të kam'"	—N/a
16	Rosela Gjylbegu and Arbër Arapi	"Pëshperitje zemrash"	Qualified

Semi-final 2 – 17 December 2004
R/O	Artist(s)	Song	Result
1	Barbana Dini	"Jeta këtu s'mbaron"	—N/a
2	Kujtim Prodani	"Jetën ndryshe e shikoj"	Qualified
3	Olsa Spata	"Pritje"	—N/a
4	Shpat Kasapi	"Jam, kam të fal"	—N/a
5	Monika Trungu	"Ti më bën të pasur"	Qualified
6	Samanta Karavella	"Buzëqeshje"	Qualified
7	Çlirim Denaj	"Ti ike"	—N/a
8	Tergita Gusta	"Me ty, pa ty"	Qualified
9	Luiz Ejlli	"Hëna dhe yjet dashurojnë"	Qualified
10	Elsida Sinaj	"Harresë kujtimesh"	—N/a
11	Sajmir Çili	"Ëndërr e gjallë"	—N/a
12	Redon Makashi	"Ndjenjë"	Qualified
13	Ingrid Jushi	"Vetëm një natë"	Qualified
14	Kozma Dushi and Ermira Kola	"Të bashkëjetoj me ty"	—N/a
15	Ledina Çelo	"Nesër shkoj"	Qualified
16	Sajmir and Enkela Braho	"Para se të vish në këtë botë"	Qualified

===== Final =====
The grand final of Festivali i Këngës took place on 18 December 2004. "Nesër shkoj" performed by Ledina Çelo emerged as the winning entry and was simultaneously announced as the Albanian entry for the Eurovision Song Contest 2005.

Key: Winner Second place Third place

Final – 18 December 2004
R/O	Artist(s)	Song	Place
1	Kujtim Prodani	"Jetën ndryshe e shikoj"	—N/a
2	Redon Makashi	"Ndjenjë"	—N/a
3	Rovena Stefa	"Kthehem prapë"	—N/a
4	Sajmir and Enkela Braho	"Para se të vish në këtë botë"	—N/a
5	Joe Artid Fejzo	"Me ty"	—N/a
6	Tergita Gusta	"Me ty, pa ty"	—N/a
7	Marsida Saraçi	"Më duaj gjatë"	—N/a
8	Luiz Ejlli	"Hëna dhe yjet dashurojnë"	2
9	Julian Lekoçaj	"Do të fal"	—N/a
10	Mariza Ikonomi	"Kur dashuron"	—N/a
11	Samanta Karavella	"Buzëqeshje"	—N/a
12	Ledina Çelo	"Nesër shkoj"	1
13	Jonida Maliqi	"Frikem se më pëlqen"	3
14	Klajdi Musabelliu	"Puthjen nuk ta kam harruar"	—N/a
15	Monika Trungu	"Ti më bën të pasur"	—N/a
16	Rosela Gjylbegu and Arbër Arapi	"Pëshperitje zemrash"	—N/a
17	Vesa Luma, Teuta Kurti and Rona Nishliu	"Flakareshë"	—N/a
18	Ingrid Jushi	"Vetëm një natë"	—N/a

== At Eurovision ==
The Eurovision Song Contest 2005 took place at the Palace of Sports in Kyiv, Ukraine, and consisted of a semi-final on 19 May and the grand final on 21 May 2005. According to the Eurovision rules, all participating countries, except the host nation and the "Big Four", consisting of France, Germany, Spain and the United Kingdom, were required to qualify from the semi-final to compete for the final, although the top 10 countries from the semi-final progress to the final. Due to the top 11 result in the previous year, Albania automatically qualified for the contest's grand final and performed eighth, following Moldova and preceding Cyprus.

=== Voting ===
The tables below visualise a breakdown of points awarded to Albania in the grand final of the Eurovision Song Contest 2005, as well as by the nation in the semi-final and final, respectively. In the grand final, Albania finished in 16th place, being awarded a total of 53 points, including 12 from Macedonia and 10 from both Greece and Switzerland. The nation awarded its 12 points to Macedonia in the semi-final and to Greece in the grand final of the contest.

==== Points awarded to Albania ====
Points awarded to Albania (Final)
Score	Country
12 points	Macedonia
10 points	Greece; Switzerland
8 points	Serbia and Montenegro
7 points	
6 points	
5 points	Bosnia and Herzegovina
4 points	
3 points	Austria
2 points	Croatia; Turkey
1 point	France

==== Points awarded by Albania ====
Points awarded by Albania (Semi-final)
Score	Country
12 points	Macedonia
10 points	Croatia
8 points	Slovenia
7 points	Israel
6 points	Andorra
5 points	Austria
4 points	Bulgaria
3 points	Moldova
2 points	Norway
1 point	Belgium

Points awarded by Albania (Final)
Score	Country
12 points	Greece
10 points	Macedonia
8 points	Turkey
7 points	Cyprus
6 points	Serbia and Montenegro
5 points	Romania
4 points	Malta
3 points	Israel
2 points	Croatia
1 point	France
