= Albania in the Eurovision Song Contest 2008 =

- Eurovision Song Contest 2008
- Participating broadcaster: Radio Televizioni Shqiptar (RTSH)
- Country: Albania
- Selection process: Festivali i Këngës 46
- Selection date: 16 December 2007

Competing entry
- Song: "Zemrën e lamë peng"
- Artist: Olta Boka
- Songwriters: Adrian Hila; Pandi Laço

Placement
- Semi-final result: Qualified (9th, 67 points)
- Final result: 17th, 55 points

Participation chronology

Albania was represented at the Eurovision Song Contest 2008 with the song "Zemrën e lamë peng", composed by Adrian Hila, with lyrics by Pandi Laço, and performed by Olta Boka. The Albanian participating broadcaster, Radio Televizioni Shqiptar (RTSH), selected its entry through the national selection competition Festivali i Këngës in December 2007.

To this point, the nation had participated in the Eurovision Song Contest four times since its first entry in 2004. Due to the introduction of two semi-finals, Albania was drawn to compete in the second semi-final of the contest, which took place on 22 May 2008. Performing as number six, the nation was announced among the top 10 entries of the second semi-final and therefore qualified to compete in the grand final. In the final on 24 May 2008, it performed as number three and placed 17th out of the 25 participating countries, scoring 55 points.

== Background ==
Prior to the 2008 contest, Radio Televizioni Shqiptar (RTSH) had participated in the Eurovision Song Contest representing Albania four times since its first entry in 2004. Its highest placing in the contest, to this point, had been the seventh place, which it achieved in 2004 with the song "The Image of You" performed by Anjeza Shahini.

As part of its duties as participating broadcaster, RTSH organises the selection of its entry in the Eurovision Song Contest and broadcasts the event in the country. RTSH has organised Festivali i Këngës since its inauguration in 1962. Since 2003, the winner of the competition has simultaneously won the right to represent Albania in the Eurovision Song Contest.

== Before Eurovision ==
=== Festivali i Këngës ===
RTSH organised the 46th edition of Festivali i Këngës to determine its representative for the Eurovision Song Contest 2008. The competition consisted of two semi-finals on 14 and 15 December, respectively, and the grand final on 16 December 2007. The three live shows were hosted by Albanian singer Elsa Lila and composer Pirro Çako.

==== Competing entries ====
Competing entries
Artist	Song
Ada Gurra	"Veç dashuri"
Adela Bezhani	"Mos thuaj jo"
Agim Poshka	"Kujt i them të dua"
Ani Cuedari and Mateus Frroku	"Testament dashurie"
Arbër Arapi	"Mall"
Besiana Mehmeti	"Di të jetoj"
Blerina Shalari	"Zgjohem nga heshtja"
Devis Xherahu	"Endacaku"
Evans Rama	"Drita e hënës"
Eneda Tarifa	"E para letër"
Flaka Krelani and Doruntina Disha	"Jeta kërkon dashuri"
Greta Koçi	"Natën të kërkova"
Joe Artid Fejzo	"K'të natë te ty"
Jonida Maliqi	"S'ka fajtor në dashuri"
Juliana Pasha	"Një qiell të ri"
Kozma Dushi	"Tatuazh në kujtesë"
Kthjellu	"Dhoma"
Manjola Nallbani	"Kjo botë merr frymë nga dashuria"
Mariza Ikonomi	"Mall i tretur"
Mira Konçi and Redon Makashi	"Nën një qiell"
Olta Boka	"Zemrën e lamë peng"
Produkt 28	"30 sekonda"
Rosela Gjylbegu	"Po lind një yll"
Rovena Dilo	"Rrëfimi"
Sajmir Çili	"Ninullë për ty"
Samanta Karavello	"Pse u harrua dashuria"
Teuta Kurti	"Qyteti i dashurisë"
Vesa Luma	"Një natë për mua"
Voltan Prodani	"Pse humbe dashurinë"

==== Shows ====
===== Semi-finals =====
The semi-finals of Festivali i Këngës took place on 14 December and 15 December 2007, respectively. The first semi-final featured a guest performance from Albanian rock band Elita 5. 15 contestants participated in the first semi-final and 14 in the second, with the highlighted ones progressing to the grand final.

Semi-final 1 – 14 December 2007
R/O	Artist	Song	Result
1	Arbër Arapi	"Mall"	—N/a
2	Besiana Mehmeti	"Di të jetoj"	—N/a
3	Ani Cuedari and Mateus Frroku	"Testament dashurie"	—N/a
4	Juliana Pasha	"Një qiell të ri"	Qualified
5	Produkt 28	"30 sekonda"	Qualified
6	Adela Bezhani	"Mos thuaj jo"	—N/a
7	Sajmir Çili	"Ninullë për ty"	—N/a
8	Rovena Dilo	"Rrëfimi"	—N/a
9	Evans Rama	"Drita e hënës"	—N/a
10	Joe Artid Fejzo	"K'të natë te ty"	—N/a
11	Flaka Krelani and Doruntina Disha	"Jeta kërkon dashuri"	Qualified
12	Eneda Tarifa	"E para letër"	Qualified
13	Teuta Kurti	"Qyteti i dashurisë"	Qualified
14	Rosela Gjylbegu	"Po lind një yll"	Qualified
15	Manjola Nallbani	"Kjo botë merr frymë nga dashuria"	Qualified

Semi-final 2 – 15 December 2007
R/O	Artist	Song	Result
1	Kozma Dushi	"Tatuazh në kujtesë"	Qualified
2	Devis Xherahu	"Endacaku"	Qualified
3	Blerina Shalari	"Zgjohem nga heshtja"	—N/a
4	Voltan Prodani	"Pse humbe dashurinë"	—N/a
5	Ada Gurra	"Veç dashuri"	—N/a
6	Agim Poshka	"Kujt i them të dua"	Qualified
7	Greta Koçi	"Natën të kërkova"	Qualified
8	Olta Boka	"Zemrën e lamë peng"	Qualified
9	Samanta Karavello	"Pse u harrua dashuria"	Qualified
10	Mariza Ikonomi	"Mall i tretur"	Qualified
11	Vesa Luma	"Një natë për mua"	—N/a
12	Jonida Maliqi	"S'ka fajtor në dashuri"	Qualified
13	Mira Konçi and Redon Makashi	"Nën një qiell"	Qualified
14	Kthjellu	"Dhoma"	Qualified

===== Final =====
The grand final of Festivali i Këngës took place on 16 December 2007. The winner was determined by the combination of the votes from a seven-member jury, consisting of Agim Krajka, David Tukiqi, Gjergj Leka, Gjergj Xhuvani, Rudina Magjistari, Baton Haxhia and Alban Skenderi. Guest performances were featured from Italian a cappella group Neri per Caso and Swedish musical group Rednex. "Zemrën e lamë peng" performed by Olta Boka emerged as the winner and was simultaneously announced as Albania's entry for the Eurovision Song Contest 2008.

Final–16 December 2007
R/O	Artist(s)	Song	Points	Result
1	Samanta Karavello	"Pse u harrua dashuria"	23	8
2	Produkt 28	"30 sekonda"	3	15
3	Eneda Tarifa	"E para letër"	11	10
4	Mariza Ikonomi	"Mall i tretur"	20	9
5	Mira Konçi and Redon Makashi	"Nën një qiell"	35	6
6	Flaka Krelani and Doruntina Disha	"Jeta kërkon dashuri"	57	2
7	Manjola Nallbani	"Kjo botë merr frymë nga dashuria"	27	7
8	Kthjellu	"Dhoma"	9	11
9	Kozma Dushi	"Tatuazh në kujtesë"	1	16
10	Devis Xherahu	"Endacaku"	0	17
11	Teuta Kurti	"Qyteti i dashurisë"	5	14
12	Greta Koçi	"Natën të kërkova"	35	5
13	Juliana Pasha	"Një qiell të ri"	54	3
14	Agim Poshka	"Kujt i them të dua"	8	12
15	Jonida Maliqi	"S'ka fajtor në dashuri"	36	4
16	Olta Boka	"Zemrën e lamë peng"	67	1
17	Rosela Gjylbegu	"Po lind një yll"	8	13

== At Eurovision ==
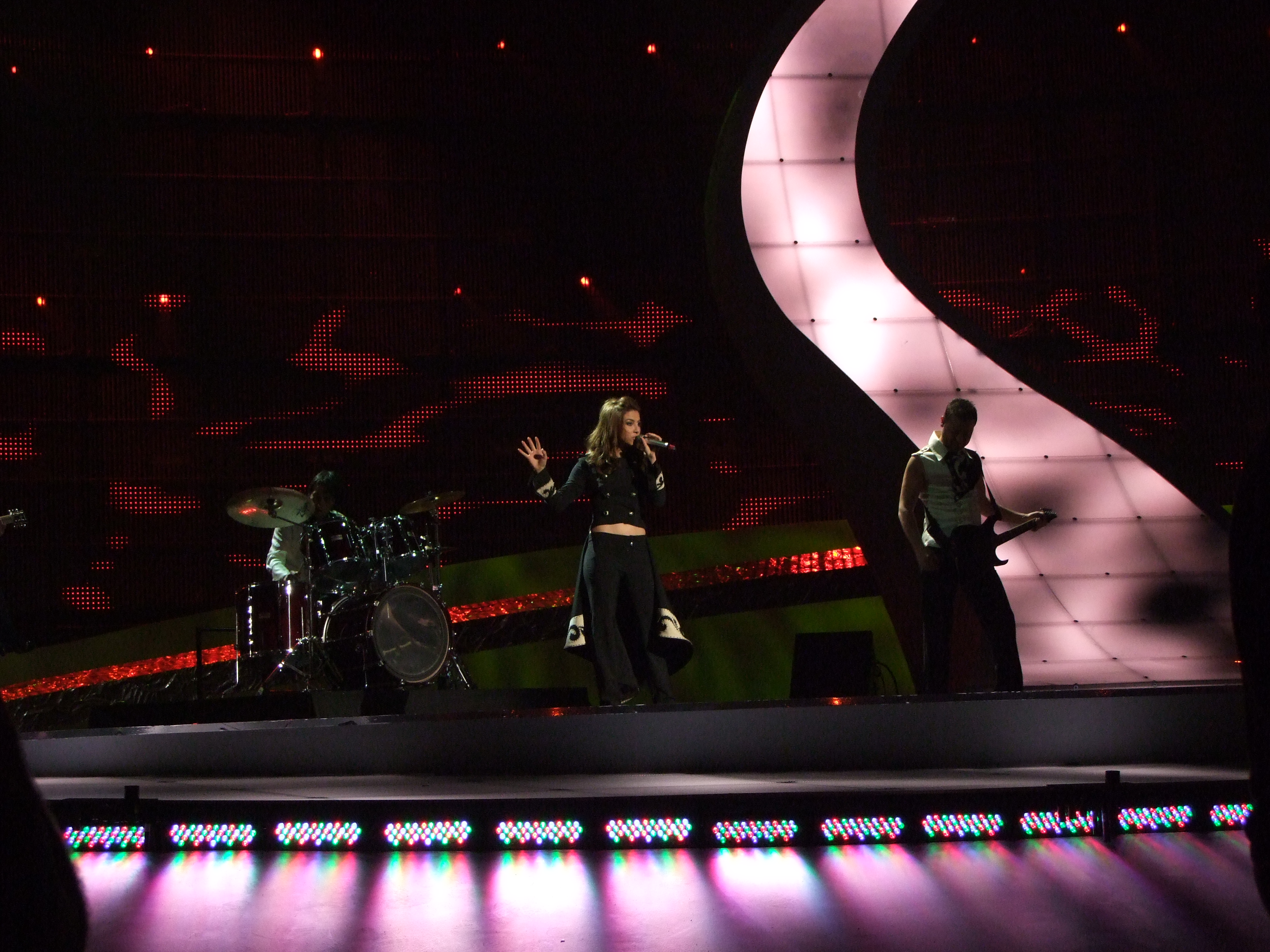
Olta Boka performing during the second semi-final of the Eurovision Song Contest 2008.

The Eurovision Song Contest 2008 took place at the Belgrade Arena in Belgrade, Serbia, and consisted of two semi-finals held on 20 and 22 May, respectively, and the grand final on 24 May 2008. According to the Eurovision rules, all participating countries, except the host nation and the "Big Four", consisting of France, Germany, Spain, and the United Kingdom, were required to qualify from one of the two semi-finals to compete for the grand final, although the top 10 countries from the respective semi-final progress to the grand final of the contest.

With the introduction of two semi-finals for the Eurovision Song Contest, Albania was required to compete in one of the two. On 28 January 2008, a special allocation draw was held that placed each country into one of the two semi-finals, with Albania being placed into the second, to be held on 22 May. Once all the competing songs for the 2008 contest had been released, the running order for the semi-finals was decided by the delegation heads of the 43 participating countries of the contest rather than through another draw; the nation was set to perform at position 6, following Lithuania and preceding Switzerland. In the grand final, it was announced that Albania would be performing third, following the United Kingdom and preceding Germany.

=== Voting ===
The tables below visualise a breakdown of points awarded to Albania in the second semi-final and grand final of the Eurovision Song Contest 2008, as well as by the nation on both occasions. In the semi-final, the nation finished in ninth place with a total of 67 points, including 12 from Macedonia and 10 from both Croatia and Switzerland. In the grand final, Albania finished in 17th place, being awarded a total of 55 points, including 12 awarded from Macedonia and 10 from Greece. The nation awarded its 12 points to Turkey in the semi-final, and to Greece in the final of the contest.

==== Points awarded to Albania ====
Points awarded to Albania (Semi-final 2)
Score	Country
12 points	Macedonia
10 points	Croatia; Switzerland
8 points	Turkey
7 points	Sweden
6 points	
5 points	Belarus; France
4 points	
3 points	Ukraine; United Kingdom
2 points	Portugal
1 point	Czech Republic; Iceland

Points awarded to Albania (Final)
Score	Country
12 points	Macedonia
10 points	Greece
8 points	Croatia; Switzerland
7 points	Montenegro
6 points	
5 points	
4 points	Slovenia
3 points	San Marino
2 points	
1 point	Azerbaijan; Bosnia and Herzegovina; Turkey

==== Points awarded by Albania ====
Points awarded by Albania (Semi-final 2)
Score	Country
12 points	Turkey
10 points	Switzerland
8 points	Malta
7 points	Macedonia
6 points	Portugal
5 points	Iceland
4 points	Denmark
3 points	Croatia
2 points	Cyprus
1 point	Sweden

Points awarded by Albania (Final)
Score	Country
12 points	Greece
10 points	Turkey
8 points	Ukraine
7 points	Norway
6 points	Russia
5 points	Serbia
4 points	Israel
3 points	Sweden
2 points	Armenia
1 point	Spain
