= Rosela Gjylbegu =

Albanian singer (born 1987)

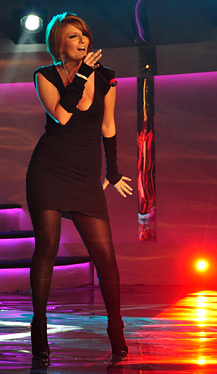
- Rosela Gjylbegu performing the winning song at "Kënga Magjike" 2009

Background information
- Born: Rosela Gjylbegu; 13 March 1987 (age 39); Shkodër, PSR Albania
- Occupation: Singer
- Years active: 2002–present

Rosela Gjylbegu (pronounced [ɾɔˈsɛla ɟylbɛɡu]; born 13 March 1987) is an Albanian singer who won the Kënga Magjike music competition in 2009.

== Life ==
Rosela graduated at the Shkolla e Mesme Pedagogjike in Shkodër and obtained a degree in Social Work at the University of Tirana since residing there, and finished a master's degree in gender equality. Since 2009 she works at the Albanian Parliament in the Public relations Directorate. Admires ballet and various sports.

In her early childhood she took part in various school activities, continuing with her participation in Shkodër's children festivals as a choir singer, and later as a solo performer. Although passionate about ballet at school and part of ballet troupe there, she randomly started her music career when in a celebration, at age eleven, she filled in for her absent friend to sing Mariah Carey's "Without You". Her performance impressed her teacher who brought her to the "Qendra Kulturore e Fëmijëve" (Children's Cultural Centre). In 1999 she performed in a trio titled "Të Europës jemi ne" (We are Europe's) composed by Jetmir Barbullushi and won the second prize. During the same period she took part in different activities around the town of Shkodër and other school activities.

Despite taking part in many competitions, it was only in 2003 when Rosela was given an excellent opportunity to show her talent. This involved participation in "Ethet e së premtes mbrëma", or "Krasta Show", after showman Adi Krasta, the Albanian equivalent of "Pop Idol", which in a way changed her life forever and gave her a chance to show off her values and vocal talent. She reached third place and immediately became famous, winning the audience's sympathy.

== Career ==
Right after "Ethet" Rosela took part in Festivali i Këngës 42 in December 2003 with the song "Hirushja" and won third prize. In 2004, she took part in the Eurovision Song Contest 2004 as a back-vocal along with other "Ethet" winners, when Albania debuted with Anjeza Shahini's song. In December 2004, she took part in Festivali i Këngës 43 in a duet with Arbër Arapi titled "Pëshpëritje zemrash". In the meantime she took part in important concerts and activities throughout Albania. In December 2006 she took part in Festivali i Këngës 45 and took second place with Pirro Çako's song "Pa ty, pa mua".

In December 2007 she took part in "Festivali i Këngës 46" with "Po lind një yll" and ranked 13th. Rosela's cooperation with Eliza continued (see next section) with their other song "Një tjetër jetë", which they performed along with Pirro Çako in "Festivali i 48" in December 2009. This song's official video, the second one for Rosela, premiered on 24 May 2010 on "SuperSonic TV".

As a guest of honour in December 2011 she participated in the gala evening of the Festivali i Këngës 50 with the song "Mesnatë" (Midnight), a homage to the great artist Vaçe Zela. At the 2007 "Kënga Magjike" song festival Rosela took part with "Për ne të dy" and won "Magjia e Parë" prize. At the 2008 "Kënga Magjike" she took part with "Tjetra" and wins the "Çmimi Çesk Zadeja".

In her duet with Kosovar singer Eliza Hoxha titled "Rruga e zemrës" (Hearts' way; lyrics by Eliza Hoxha, composed by Darko Dimitrov), Rosela won first place and "Çmimi Çesk Zadeja" of the 2009 edition of "Kënga Magjike". In January 2010 the two singers, in cooperation with "Pixels Productions" shot the video for this song in Pristina, which would become Rosela's first one.

Although she did not compete in the 2010 "Kënga Magjike" owing to other activities, as winners of last edition Rosela and Eliza opened this edition's final on 20 November. In addition to this, they also accompanied comedian Agron Llakaj along Shpëtim Saraçi on piano in interpreting "Dialog me këngët e dashurisë" (Dialogue with the love songs), summarising Ardit Gjebrea's hits over time.

In 2011 Rosela participated for the fourth time in the "Kënga Magjike" with "Sikur të isha ti" (Wish I was you; composed by Darko Dimitrov, lyrics by Big Basta), winning the Best Lyrics prize and achieving fifth place in the final ranking. The song reached top place in the Albania Top 5 on Radio+ FM and remained there for five consecutive weeks.

== Këngët e Shekullit ==
=== 2010‒2011 ===
In 2010 Rosela was invited to be part of the TV Klan's third edition of the well-known weekly show "Këngët e Shekullit" (Songs of the Century). The show started 16 October 2010, lasted for twelve weeks through Christmas, ending on 2011 New Year's Eve, and brought together the ten best Albanian music artists and one hundred best songs. As the youngest participant and one of three artists from Shkodër, she performed alongside veterans Merita Halili, Ramadan Krasniqi, Frederik Ndoci, Stefi and Endri Prifti, Eranda Libohova, Irini Qirjako, Selami Kolonja, Maya, Bujar Qamili, etc. In order to dedicate herself to this show Rosela did not participate in other festivals.

Songs she had been performing here each week, in order of appearance are: "Kur më del në derë" (When you get at the door), "S'ka ma të bukur se pranvera" (Nothing's as beautiful as spring), "Ku po shkon me ato dimi?" (Where do you go with that shalwar?), "Djalë i dashtun" (Dear boy), "Sa të kam dashtë unë ty" (How much I have loved you), "O zambak i bardhë" (White lily), "O moj e vogël sa të du" (You little one I love you so), "Të dinja të vogël" (I imagined you small), "Xhamadani kuq si gjaku" (Doublet red as blood), "Këndon gjeli" (Rooster sings; virtual duet with Xhavit Xhepa), "Kur më vjen burri nga stani", "Për mu paska kenë kismet" (This seems to have been my fate) and "Kur perëndon dielli" (When the sun goes down; also known as "Po t'jemi bashkë ne të dy" (If we could be together); duet with Bujar Qamili).

Rosela's recital, also named "Rosela dhe miqtë" (Rosela and friends), became part of the opening evening of the second programme in an eleven-week series of this edition starting on 15 January 2011 in a different format, a privilege given to the youngest artist of the show. Tickets for this evening were given for free.

Except for bringing together all of her songs from last year, here she additionally performed a collage of other artists' songs from this show, accompanied by the orchestra (including songs "I yti qeshë dhe jam" (Selami Kolonja), "Gjitonen që kisha pranë" (Maya), "O bilbil ore këngëtar" (Eranda Libohova), "Ti në kumull, unë në kumull" (Bujar Qamili)), "Serenatë për nusen" (Serenade for the bride) in duet with Sidrit Bejleri, and an emotionally charged duet with her father, Myfit Gjylbegu, in "Karafilat që ka Shkodra" (Cloves Shkodra has).

She reperformed her songs "Po t'jemi bashkë ne të dy" with Pirro Çako instead, and "Kur më vjen burri nga stani", this time in a humorous cooperation with the three young tenors discovered in the third edition of "Gjeniu i vogël" show in 2010, Tedi Paçrami, Kledi Mahmutaj and Riad Bashi.

In addition to this, a candid-camera style footage of Rosela at the backstages of the 2010 show was shown.

=== 2011‒2012 ===
Starting 22 October 2011 through 2 January 2012, Rosela took part in the fourth edition of TV Klan's programme dedicated to best foreign songs of the century. Worth mentioning are her duets "I don't wanna talk about it" (with Redon Makashi), "Corazon Espinado" (with Altin Goci), "I want to spend my lifetime loving you" (with Frederik Ndoci), "Mina Medley" (with Eliza Hoxha) and "Empire state of mind" (with Big Basta). Apart from duets, she performed the hits "Historia de un amor", "Addicted to love", "What a feeling", "Ne me quitte pas", "Gli uomini/Almeno tu nell' universo" and "O Happy Day", performing in English, French and Italian.

== Acting and other activities ==
In 2004 Rosela took part in the "Notre-Dame de Paris" musical where she cooperated with many famous artists of Albanian music. Here she played the role of Fleur-de-Lys de Gondelaurier and performed the associated song "Ces diamants-là" (These diamonds here) in duet with Arbër Arapi, who played Phoebus de Chateaupers.

In December 2009, she appeared lip syncing in the music video for the song "S'të fal" (I won't forgive you) from "Kthjellu" featuring Flori and dedicated to Dritan Hoxha, founder of Top Media, who died in a car accident in 2008.

In 2010 Rosela became host and protagonist of the documentary "Discover Tirana with Rosela Gjylbegu" of "Southeast Europe's: People and Culture" website developed by the European Commission's Directorate-General for Enlargement with the aim to inform visitors about cultural activities in Southeast Europe and thus forming part of Commission's information and communication activities in the field of EU-enlargement. While talking mainly about Rosela and her activities, the documentary informed the viewer about Tirana and opportunities there.

As written above, on 19 November 2010, in the 2010 "Kënga Magjike" Rosela and Eliza accompanied comedian Agron Llakaj and pianist Shpëtim Saraçi in interpreting "Dialog me këngët e dashurisë" (Dialogue with the love songs), summarising this festival's creator's, Ardit Gjebrea's hits of his career.

On 5 December 2010 she played a part in Vizion +'s weekly comedy show "Apartamenti 2XL" as a surprise guest in its tenth episode of season two.

Rosela has presented, along with the comedian Julian Deda, the 50th Albanian Nationwide Children's Song Festival held in Shkodër in July 2012.

In 2018, she was a jury member for Albania in the Eurovision Song Contest 2018.

== Awards ==
Festivali i Këngës

Year	Nominee / work	Award	Result
2006	"Pa ty, pa mua"	Second Prize	Won

Kënga Magjike

Year	Nominee / work	Award	Result
2007	"Per ne te dy"	The First Magic	Won
2008	"Tjetra"	Cesk Zadeja Prize	Won
2009	"Rruga e zemres(ft.Eliza Hoxha)"	First Prize	Won
2009	"Rruga e zemres(ft.Eliza Hoxha)"	Cesk Zadeja Prize	Won
2011	"Sikur te isha ti"	Best Lyrics	Won
2014	"Rri me mua"	Best Ballad	Won
2014	"Rri me mua"	Third Prize	Won
2016	"Maratone"	Cesk Zadeja Prize	Won

Cmimet Kult/Kult Awards

Year	Nominee / work	Award	Result
2015	"Rri me mua"	Song of the Year	Won

Netet e Klipit Shqiptare

Year	Nominee / work	Award	Result
2015	"Jam aty(ft.Vullnet)"	The best story in video	Won

Kenga Ime

Year	Nominee / work	Award	Result
2014	"Tash s'po du(ft.Stresi)"	Public Prize	Won

Zhurma Show Awards

Year	Nominee / work	Award	Result
2015	"Jam aty(ft.Vullnet)"	Best Rock	Won

== Discography ==
The discography of Rolesa Gjylbegu:

Title	Year	Album
"Hirushja"	2003	Non-album single
"Peshperitje zemrash" (with Arber Arapi)	2004	Non-album single
"Pa ty, pa mua"	2006	Non-album single
"Per ne të dy"	2007	Non-album single
"Po lind një yll"	2007	Non-album single
"Tjetra"	2008	Non-album single
"Rruga e zemrës" (with Eliza Hoxha)	2009	Non-album single
"Nje tjetër jetë" (with Eliza Hoxha and Pirro Cako)	2009	Non-album single
"Sikur të isha ti"	2011	Non-album single
"Formula e lumturisë" (with Sinan Vllasaliu)	2012	Non-album single
"O moj e vogël sa të du"	2012	Non-album single
"Deshirë"	2012	Non-album single
"Pafundësi"	2013	Non-album single
"Rri me mua"	2014	Non-album single
"Jam aty" (featuring Vullnet Ibraimi)	2015	Non-album single
"Maratonë"	2016	Non-album single
"Vashëzo"	2020	Non-album single
