= Kënga Magjike 2007 =

Dates
- Final: 25 November

Host
- Venue: Palace of Congresses, Tirana, Albania
- Presenter(s): Ardit Gjebrea

Participants
- Number of entries: 54 songs

Vote
- Voting system: Singers voted for each other, jury, televote
- Winning song: Aurela Gaçe

Kënga Magjike 2007, was the ninth edition of the annual Albanian song competition, first held in 1999. It took place in the Palace of Congresses in Tirana, Albania. There were two semifinals (23 and 24 November 2007) and a final (25 November 2007). Fifty-four songs were heard in advance by the public at home, which narrowed them down to 40 songs by televoting. These songs competed in the semi-finals but only eighteen made it to the final. Ten songs were voted into the finals by the singers and eight songs by the jury. In the end, Aurela Gaçe won the first prize. Florjan Mumajesi and Soni Malaj were the runners-up. The winner was determined by the singers who voted for each other.

== Results ==
Rank	Artist	Song	Points
1	Aurela Gaçe	Hape Veten	529
2	Florjan Mumajesi & Soni Malaj	Fluturimi 3470	403
3	Elvana Gjata	Ku Jeton Dashuria	386
4	Anjeza Shahini	Nxënësja Më E Mirë	362
5	Jehona Sopi	Fustani I Bardhë	334

== Semifinal one ==
#	Artist	Song	Finalist
1	Alb Magji	Baby	NO
2	Ani Cuedari	S'të Ndjej	NO
3	Aurela Gaçe	Hape Veten	YES
4	Berkan	Dashuri Kronike	YES
5	Blerina Matraku	U Tha	NO
6	Çiljeta Feat. Endri & Stefi Prifti	Kur Këndoj Serenatë	YES
7	Dorina Muçeku	S'dua	NO
8	Elvana Gjata	Ku Jeton Dashuria	YES
9	Emi Bogdo	E Shkuara...Shkon	NO
10	Erga Halilaj	Pa Kthim	YES
11	Hana Cakulli	U Shërova	YES
12	Jehona Sopi	Fustani I Bardhë	YES
13	Jetmir Hyseni	Princesha E Kafeterisë	NO
14	Joana	Më Mungon	NO
15	Lena	Plazhi I Kujtimeve	NO
16	NRG Band	Eja Me Mu Nji Nat	YES
17	Qelbanix	Dua Të Dal E Të Kthehem Prapë	NO
18	Rosela Gjylbegu	Për Ne Të Dy	YES
19	Samanta Karavella	Iluzjon	NO
20	Valon Shehu	I Mbyll Sytë	NO

== Semifinal two ==
#	Artist	Song	Finalist
1	0290	Jena	NO
2	Albëria	Ik Tani	YES
3	Anjeza Shahini	Nxënësja Më E Mirë	YES
4	Arbër Arapi & Marsida Saraçi	Hapa Dashurie	NO
5	Besa	Pa Yllin Tënd	YES
6	Burn	Nuk Ja Vlejti	YES
7	Evi Reçi	Zjarr I Harruar	NO
8	Florjan Mumajesi & Soni Malaj	Fluturimi 3470	YES
9	Gili	Mysafire Nderi	YES
10	Julka	Bla Bla Bla	YES
11	Kastro Zizo	Gjinkalla Që Do Dashuroj Në 2070	YES
12	Leonora Jakupi	Një Herë Në Jetë	YES
13	Lori	Amerika	NO
14	Master Bass & 25%	Kam Stress	NO
15	Rezarta Shkurta	I Pafat	NO
16	Seldi	Gocë Trendi	NO
17	Valbona Ostreni	Mike Mediatike	NO
18	Dj Vini (Ervin Xhixho)	Ëndrrat Nuk Kanë Fund	NO
19	Vitmar Basha	Akoma Tonat	NO
20	Xhuli	Dhe Sa Kohë	NO

== Not in the semifinals ==
#	Artist	Song
1	Anjeza Qose	Dimension
2	Big Basta & Shamsa	Erdhi Koha
3	Blerina Osaj	Happy End
4	Djemtë E Detit	Në Udhëkryq
5	Edita Sopjani	Mua Nuk Ma Nin
6	Errësira E Jetës	Energy
7	Flaka Krelani	Nata
8	Gilan G	Wow
9	Hermes	Ndjej
10	Jorida Zaimi	Ti Dikur Si Një Zot
11	Luar	Nuk Të Njoh
12	Mateus Frroku	Pranë Zemrës Më Ke
13	Noizy	Veç Për Ty
14	Vedat Ademi	Mall Që Djeg

== Voting procedure ==
Ten songs were voted into the finals by the singers and eight songs by the jury.

- The singers voted for each other to determine the ranking of the songs.
- The jury determined most of the other prizes, while the televote decided the "Public's Prize", the "Internet Prize" and the "Hit Song" prize.
- The production studios decided the "Discography Prize".
- Ardit Gjebrea decided the "Jon Music" prize.

=== Jury ===
- President of the Jury, Singer: Gaqo Çako
- President of the Jury, Singer: Luiza Papa
- Songwriter: Françesk Radi
- News Anchor: Tefta Radi
- Composer, Professor: Nora Çashku
- Filmmaker: Kujtim Çashku
- Singer: Kaliopi
- Actor, Filmmaker: Vasil Zafircev
- Singer: Mihrije Braha
- Singer: Naim Abazi
- Riza Cerova
- Diana Cerova

== Other prizes ==
#	Prize	Translation	Artist	Song
1	Best Melodi	Best Melody	Hana Cakulli	U Shërova
2	Best Alternativ	Best Alternative	Erga Halilaj	Pa Kthim
3	Best Dance	Best Dance	Julka	Bla Bla Bla
4	Best Rock	Best Rock	Burn	Nuk Ja Vlejti
5	Magjia e Parë	First Magic	Rosela Gjylbegu	Për Ne Të Dy
6	Kantautori Më i Mirë	Best Songwriter	Albëria	Ik Tani
7	Best Group	Best Group	NRG Band	Eja Me Mu Nji Nat
8	Çmimi i Publikut	Public's Prize	Leonora Jakupi	Një Herë Në Jetë
9	Tendence	Tendence	Kastro Zizo	Gjinkalla Që Do Dashuroj Në 2070
10	Çesk Zadeja	Çesk Zadeja	Gili	Mysafire Nderi
11	Jon Music	Jon Music	Besa	Pa Yllin Tënd
12	Çmimi i Kritikës	Critic's Prize	Anjeza Shahini	Nxënësja Më E Mirë
13	Çmimi i Internetit	Internet Prize	Berkan	Dashuri Kronike
14	Çmimi i Interpretimit	Best Interpretation	Aurela Gaçe	Hape Veten
15	Çmimi Diskografik	Discography Prize	Elvana Gjata	Ku Jeton Dashuria
16	Paraqitja Skenike	Stage Presence	Çiljeta feat. Endri & Stefi Prifti	Kur Këndoj Serenatë
17	Kënga Hit	Hit Song	Florjan Mumajesi & Soni Malaj	Fluturimi 3470
18	Best Vokal	Best Vocal	Jehona Sopi	Fustani I Bardhë
19	Kënga Stil	Style Song	Valbona Ostreni	Mike Mediatike
20	Çmimi Televiziv	Television Prize	Rezarta Shkurta	I Pafat

== Orchestra ==
In all the live shows the singers used playback all the time. This has now become a tradition of the festival for years.

== Guest artists ==
=== Comedians ===
- Hajrie Rondo (Tana - 14 Vjeç Dhëndër)
- Albert Vërria (Xha Sulo - Kapedani)

=== Gaqo Çako Reprise ===
- Gaqo Çako
- Ema Qazimi
- Liljana Kondakçi
- Myfarete Laze
- Edit Mihali
- Limoz Dizdari
- Luiza Papa
- Ibrahim Madhi (violin)

=== Others ===
- Kaliopi
- Mihrije Braha
- Naim Abazi

== Staff ==
- Executive Producer: Anila Gjebrea
- Stage: Bashkim Zahaj
- Organizer: Ardit Gjebrea
- Directors: Agron Vulaj; Astrit Idrizi
