= Dren Abazi =

Kosovar singer and songwriter (born 1985)

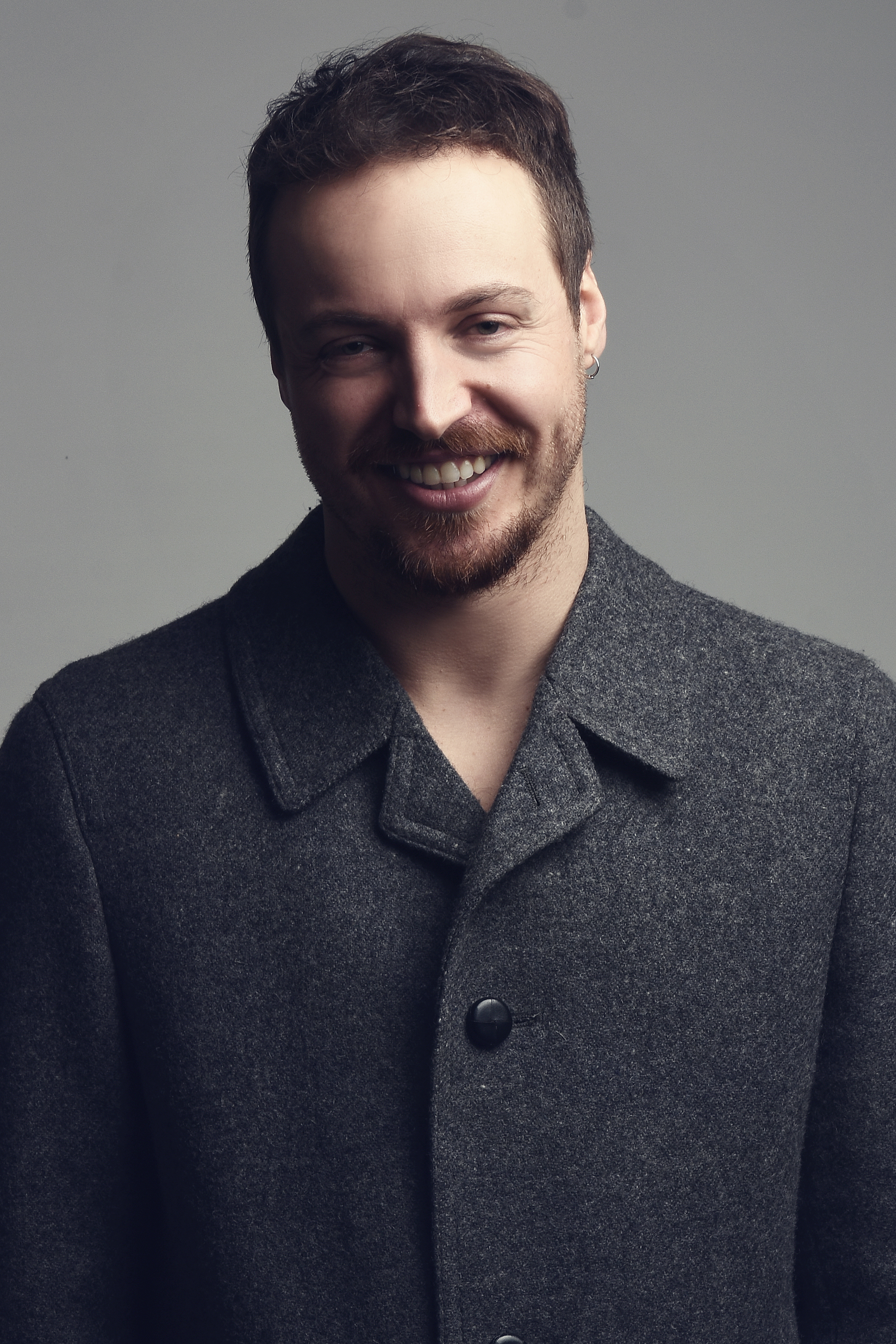

Background information
- Born: Dren Abazi; 13 February 1985 (age 40); Pristina, SAP Kosovo, SFR Yugoslavia
- Genres: Balkan, klezmer, jazz, ska, world, rock
- Occupations: Musician, singer, songwriter, guitarist, composer, producer
- Instruments: Guitars, bass, vocals
- Years active: 2003–present
- Member of: Dren Abazi & Zig Zag Orchestra
- Formerly of: Sansara (1997-2005), Gre3nt (2007)
- Website: Dren Abazi – Artist Website

Dren Abazi (born 13 February 1985) is a Kosovan singer, songwriter and producer. He is the founder and leader of Zig Zag Orchestra, a popular band in Kosovo, Albania, and other Balkan countries.

== Biography ==
Dren Abazi was born in Pristina, at the time in the Socialist Autonomous Province of Kosovo. Although he made his debut at a very young age, as a guitar player for different local rock bands, he gained public and media attention and made his breakthrough after creating his own band Zig Zag Orchestra in 2008. He rose to fame quickly in 2011 after composing and performing "Ti dhe Une" a duet with Albanian female singer Anjeza Shahini, the song quickly became a hit in Albania and was chosen as the song of the year by national Albanian TV Top Channel.

In 2014 his song "Naten" became a part of the soundtrack for Let's Be Cops, which starred Andy Garcia and Nina Dobrev. In addition, the song is part of the album Afterparty, released in 2012 won the National Prize KULT in Tirana, Albania, for the best Albanian album of the year.

== Dren Abazi and Zig Zag Orchestra ==
The orchestra composes and performs multicultural trans-ethnic music. Beginning in 2009, it has performed in several concerts and festivals all around the Europe. In 2015 Dren Abazi & Zig Zag Orchestra performed in the famous Jazz on Sienne and in Sunset Festival, in Paris. As well as in June in Fete de la Musique also known as Make Music Day, in Republique concert in Paris.

== Discography ==
=== Albums ===
- Welcome to Prishtina – Sansara (2003)
- Afterparty – Dren Abazi & Zig Zag Orchestra (2012)
- Mes yjesh – Dren Abazi & Zig Zag Orchestra (2017)

=== Singles ===
- "Pa Lidhje" - Gre3n (2007)
- "Jorgjica" (2009)
- "I dehur jam" (2010)
- "Dasma" (2010)
- "Une ty moj" (2010)
- "Euphoria" (2010)
- "Iku me eren" (2011)
- "Ti dhe une" (2011)
- "Pa frymë" (2011)
- "Naten" (2012)
- "Si Era" (2013)
- "Mes yjesh" (2013)
- "Mbreti Nates" (2014)
- "Sa Larg" (2014)
- "Du" (2015)
- "Lamtumire" (2016)
- "Kur je me mu" (2017)
- "Deja vu" (2018)
- "Zjarr e akull" (2020)
- "Hana" (2021)
- "Ne Syte E Tu" (2022)
- "Nuk Te Harroj" (2022)
- "Ndoshta" (2023)
