= Pandi Laço =

Albanian journalist and songwriter (born 1964)

- Born: March 21, 1964 (age 61); Korçë, Albania
- Occupation(s): Songwriter, TV presenter, journalist, scenarist

Pandi Laço (born 21 March 1964) is an Albanian journalist, songwriter, presenter and scenarist. He is mostly known for his work on Albanian Eurovision songs, of which he wrote several. Pandi has worked with notable Albanian artists, including Frederik Ndoci. He hosted Festivali i Këngës in 2015. Laço started his own show called Histori me Zhurmues (Stories with Jammers), a show for Albanian history in film and music.

He was a judge on the reality competition show The X Factor Albania from 2012 to 2015.

== Notable writings ==
- 2005: "Tomorrow I Go" by Ledina Çelo.
- 2007: "Hear My Plea" by Frederik Ndoci.
- 2008: "Zemrën E Lamë Peng" by Olta Boka.(written by Pandi Laço)]
- 2015: "Dambaje" by Mishela Rapo.
