= Olta Boka =

Albanian singer

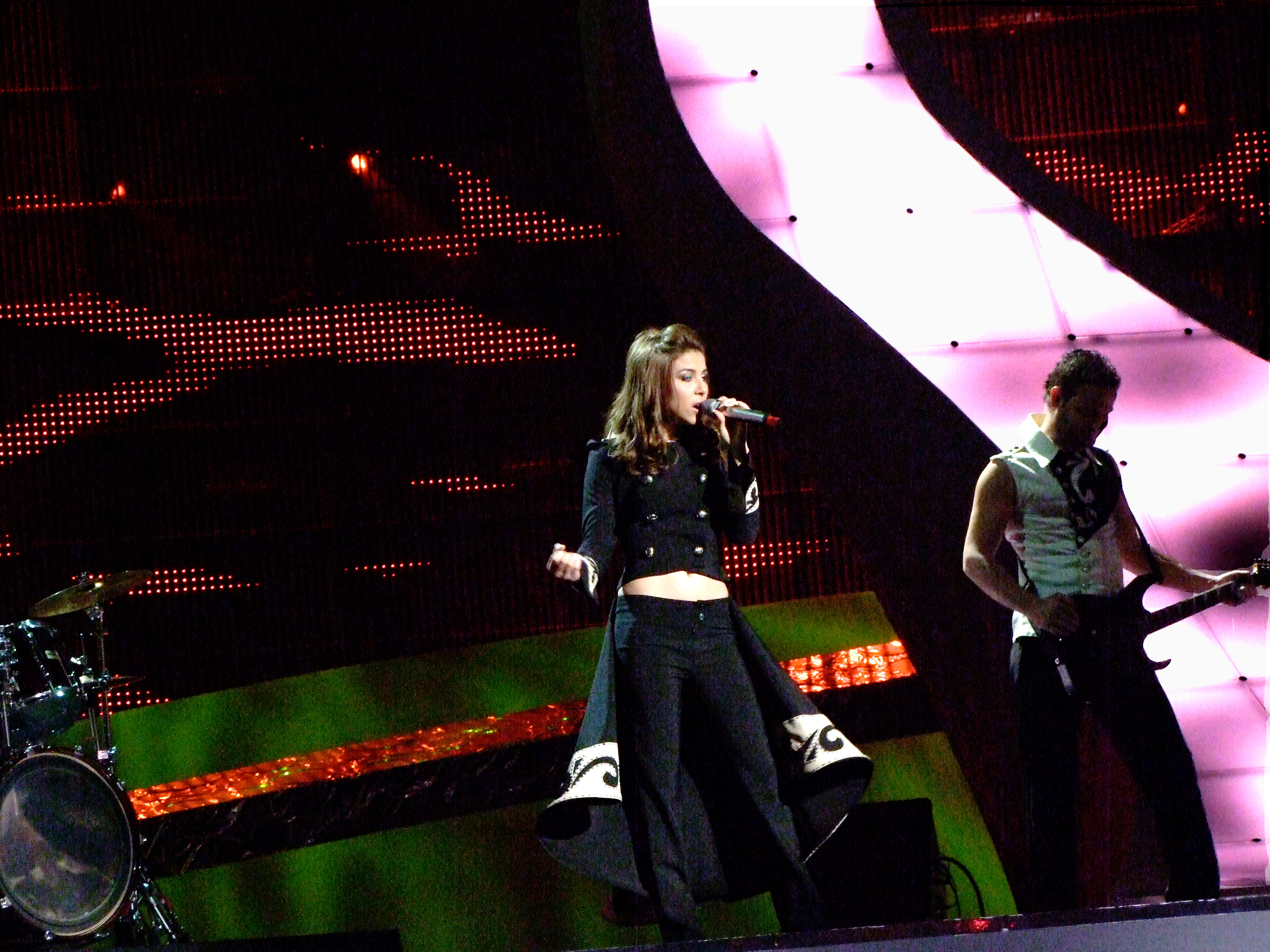
- Boka during the Eurovision Song Contest 2008

Background information
- Born: 13 September 1991 (age 34); Tirana, Republic of Albania
- Genres: Pop; R&B; pop rock
- Occupation: Singer
- Instrument: Vocals
- Years active: 2001–present

Olta Boka (born 13 September 1991) is an Albanian singer. She represented Albania in the Eurovision Song Contest 2008 with the song "Zemrën e lamë peng", after winning Festivali i Këngës 46.

== Career ==
Olta Boka was born in Tirana. She started singing at a very young age. She has participated in the talent shows: "Gjeniu i vogël" where she won the Best Performer award, and also in "Ethet e së premtes mbrëma" (Albanian version of Idols).

She rose to fame after winning Festivali i Këngës in 2007, giving her the right to represent Albania in Eurovision Song Contest the next year. She competed in the second semi-final on May 22, and won a place in the final on May 24, where she finished 17th out of 25 entrants with 55 points. She is the youngest singer to represent Albania in the Eurovision Song Contest.

She has won several awards in the major musical event Kënga Magjike. She has also won the "Top Albania Radio Award" in Top Fest 11. In 2013, Boka played the role of Esmeralda in the Albanian version of Notre Dame de Paris musical. A year later, she participated in TV Klan's dancing competition "Dance With Me" and won four prizes, alongside actor Devis Muka.

== Discography ==
- 2001: Të dy prindërit i dua
- 2007: Zemrën e lamë peng
- 2009: S'duhet të dua
- 2009: Jepu me zemër
- 2010: Mbete një brengë
- 2011: Anna
- 2013: E fundit tango
- 2014: Ti më ke mua (ft. Erik Lloshi)
- 2014: Parfumi i tij
- 2016: Rri edhe pak
- 2017: Atij/asaj (ft. Stiv Boka)

== Awards ==
Kënga Magjike

Year	Nominee / work	Award	Result
2009	"Jepu me zemër"	AMC Prize	Won
2010	"Mbete një brengë"	Best Ballad	Won
2011	"Anna"	AMC Prize	Won
2013	"E fundit tango"	Best Performance	Won

Top Fest

Year	Nominee / work	Award	Result
2014	"Ti më ke mua" (ft. Erik Lloshi)	Top Albania Radio Award	Won

Awards and achievements
Preceded by Frederik and Aida Ndoci with Balada e gurit	Festivali i Këngës; Winner; 2007	Succeeded by Kejsi Tola with Më merr në ëndërr
Preceded by Frederik Ndoci with Hear My Plea	Albania in the Eurovision Song Contest; 2008	Succeeded by Kejsi Tola with Carry Me in Your Dreams
