= Ledina Çelo =

Albanian singer

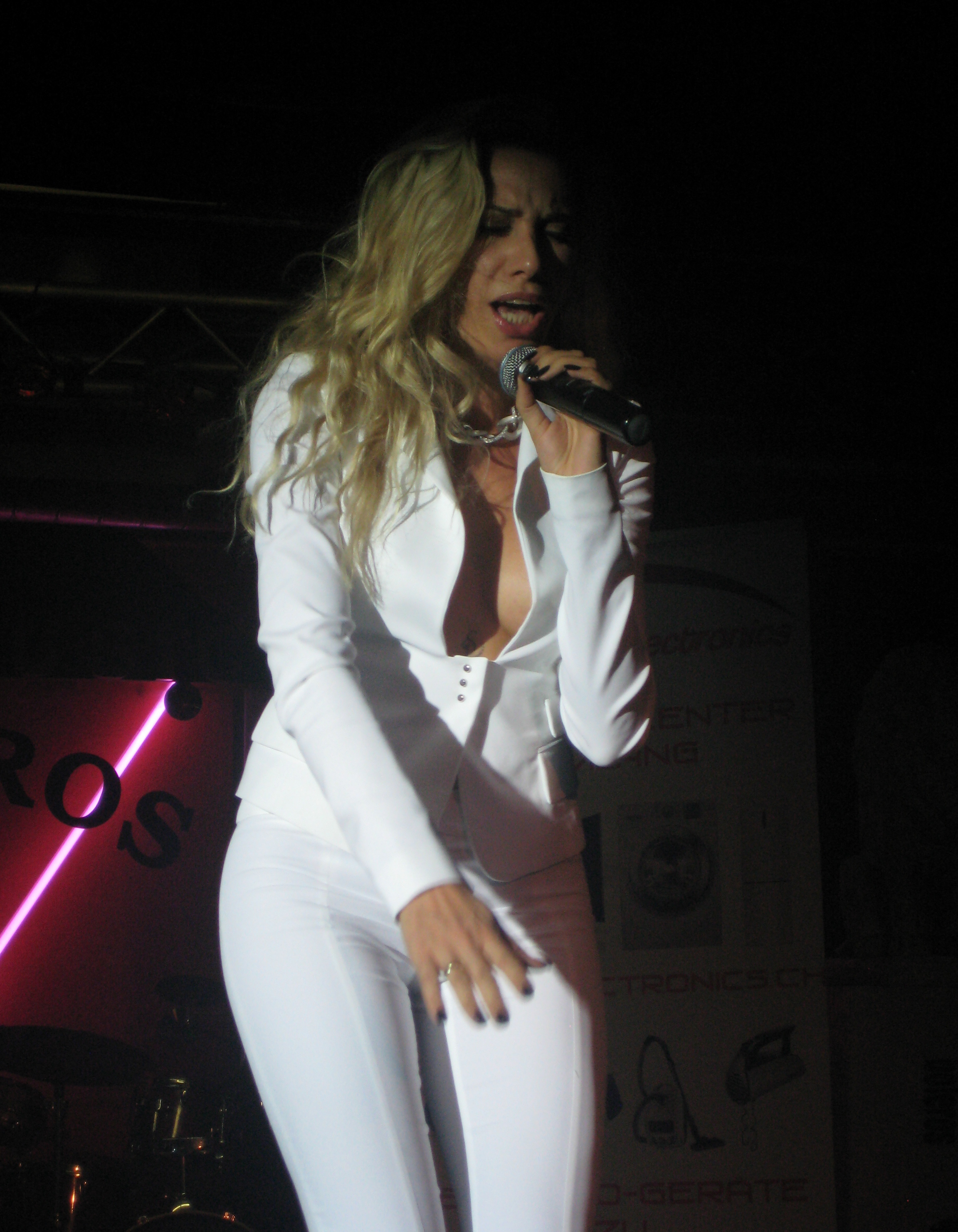
- Ledina Çelo in 2012

Background information
- Born: 9 February 1977 (age 49)
- Origin: Tirana, PSR Albania

Ledina Çelo (born 9 February 1977) is an Albanian singer and model. She is best known for representing Albania at the Eurovision Song Contest 2005 after winning the 43rd edition of Festivali i Këngës.

== Life ==
=== 2003–present ===
In December 2003, she hosted the 43rd edition of Festivali i Këngës, the national pre-selection competition for the Eurovision Song Contest. A year later, she participated as a contestant with the song Nesër Shkoj and eventually won the competition. She qualified for the grand final and finished in the sixteenth place. In 2006, Ledina Celo finished second in Kënga Magjike with the song "Jemi Të Huaj".

== Awards ==
Festivali i Këngës

Year	Nominee / work	Award	Result
2004	"Tomorrow I Go"	First Prize	Won

Kënga Magjike

Year	Nominee / work	Award	Result
2003	"Te dua se je Ti"	Linda Association Prize	Won
2004	"Ne nje ishull qe nuk ekziston"	Public Prize	Won
2006	"Jemi te huaj"	Best Performer	Won
2006	"Jemi te huaj"	Second Prize	Won
2013	"Gaboja"	Best Ballad	Won
2013	"Gaboja"	Second Prize	Won

Videofest Awards

Year	Nominee / work	Award	Result
2005	" Vagabond nga dashuria"	Best Female	Nominated
2005	" Vagabond nga dashuria"	Best Editing	Nominated
2007	"Të ndjejë të huaj"	Best Camera	Won
2007	"Të ndjejë të huaj"	Best Production	Nominated

Zhurma Show Awards

Year	Nominee / work	Award	Result
2004	"Vagabond nga dashuria"	Best Video	Nominated

Awards and achievements
Preceded by Anjeza Shahini with Imazhi yt	Festivali i Këngës; Winner; 2004	Succeeded by Luiz Ejlli with Zjarr e ftohtë
Preceded by Anjeza Shahini with The Image of You	Albania in the Eurovision Song Contest; 2005	Succeeded by Luiz Ejlli with Zjarr e ftohtë
