= Frederik Ndoci =

Albanian singer-songwriter

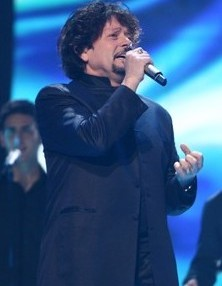

Background information
- Born: Frederik Ndoci; 9 February 1958 (age 68); Shkodër, Albania
- Origin: Shkodër, Albania
- Genres: Pop
- Occupations: Singer, writer, poet
- Years active: 1985–present
- Label: Blue November
- Website: frederikndoci.com

Frederik Ndoci (born 9 February 1958) is an Albanian singer, songwriter, poet, writer, actor and international Recording artist. He represented his country at the Eurovision Song Contest 2007, with the song "Hear My Plea".

== Eurovision Song Contest ==
Before winning the Festivali i Këngës 45, he also won the 28th competition, along with Manjola Nalbani and his sister Julia Ndoci. He performed "Balada e Gurit" (English translation: "Ballad of Stone") at the 45th festival. The song was re-titled "Hear My Plea" and translated into English for the Eurovision performance, which was only credited to Frederik. In Eurovision Song Contest semifinal he was placed 17th and didn't qualify to the final.

== Background ==
Frederik grew up in a family of artists from the northern Albanian city of Shkodra. His sister, Rita Ndoci was an operatic singer of folkloric music and a professional comedian. Another sister, Julia Ndoci, started a career as a singer right after Frederik, but with less success, she continued her career in Germany with better success. Frederik studied in the Academy of Arts and got diploma for actor. He performed in 6 movies, starring in main and supporting roles. Frederik Ndoci was named "Man Of Thousand Voices" because he sings baritone, tenor, bass and countertenor. Despite his success, he has had his share of difficulties and several times mostly caused from the Albanian communist regime of the time.

== Career ==
After his brief career in acting, Frederik's recording debut came out of Italy where he played guitar and sang with Pagina d’Album. The album Canta Frederik was well received in Italy and the subsequent video was aired on several TV stations. Frederik made inroads with his second album Sono Gitano, when it became a best seller in Italy. The CD continues to be a best seller in Frederik's home country and parts of Eastern Europe. After invitations to several major events, such as the Peace Festival in Romania, where he sang a song for the late Mother Teresa, the Miss Europa pageant, and other key festivals, Frederik set sail for the U.S., landing in San Diego, California. It was here that he was courted by the Christian College Heritage and commissioned to record his third CD, Frederik and Friends. Featuring American Christian sacred songs, Frederik recorded his first project in English.

In 2011 he wrote a poetry book called "I Lindur dhe Plak i Divorcuar" thus starting a potential career as a writer and poet.

== Discography ==
- Canta Frederik (1994–1995)
- Sono Gitano (2002)
- Vitet Gri (recordings of older songs)
- Frederik & Friends
- Romance (2005)
- Canterina (2005)

Awards and achievements
Preceded by Luiz Ejlli	Festivali i Këngës; Winner; 2006	Succeeded by Olta Boka
Preceded by Luiz Ejlli with Zjarr e ftohtë	Albania in the Eurovision Song Contest; 2007	Succeeded by Olta Boka with Zemrën e lamë peng
