= Vullnet Sefaja =

Albanian singer

- Born: 24 February 1975 (age 50)
- Origin: Titova Mitrovica, SFR Yugoslavia
- Genres: Pop rock
- Occupation: Singer
- Instruments: Vocals
- Years active: 1991–present
- Labels: Marigona
- Basketball career

Trepça
- Position: President
- League: Kosovo Basketball Superleague

Vullnet Sefaja (born 24 February 1975) is an Albanian singer and businessman. He was the vocalist of the band Marigona. He currently is the president of KB Trepça.

== Musical career ==
=== Early life ===
Sefaja started his musical career as a child.

=== Breakthrough with Marigona ===
In 1991, a musical band named Marigona was founded by Faton Kurteshi in the city of Mitrovica. Sefaja became the vocalist of the group immediately. Together with his band he published five albums and made many Albanian hits including collaborations with Anjeza Shahini, Memli Krasniqi etc. In 2020, he published the song Vet s’më le.

== Private career ==
Since 1994, Sefaja sells ceramic and other sanitary equipment. He has his own company called Kerasan. In 2020, Sefaja was named as the president of the basketball club Trepça.

== Discography ==
=== Albums ===
- "O lop't e mia" (1995)
- "Mitrovica" (2000)
- "Sonte (EP)" (2002)
- "Marigona Live" (2004)
- "Në mes nesh" (2004)

=== Singles ===
- 2004 — "Në mes nesh" ft. Anjeza Shahini
- 2018 — Mitrovica ft. Gili, Enis Potoku, Teuta Kurti, Linda Hakaj
- 2020 — Vet s’më le
