= Zemrën e lamë peng =

2008 song by Olta Boka

Single by Olta Boka
- Language: Albanian
- Released: 2008
- Length: 2:57
- Label: RTSH
- Composer: Adrian Hila
- Lyricist: Pandi Laço

Olta Boka singles chronology
"Zemrën e lamë peng" (2008)	"Jepu me zemër" (2009)

Eurovision Song Contest 2008 entry
- Country: Albania
- Artist: Olta Boka
- Language: Albanian
- Composer: Adrian Hila
- Lyricist: Pandi Laço

Finals performance
- Semi-final result: 9th
- Semi-final points: 67
- Final result: 17th
- Final points: 55

Entry chronology
- ◄ "Hear My Plea" (2007)
- "Carry Me in Your Dreams" (2009) ►

"Zemrën e lamë peng" (Albanian pronunciation: [ˈzɛmɾən ɛ ˈlamə ˈpɛŋɡ]; transl. "We gambled our hearts") is a song by Albanian singer Olta Boka, written by Pandi Laço and composed by Adrian Hila. It was released as a CD single in 2008 through Radio Televizioni Shqiptar (RTSH). Musically, it is an Albanian-language ballad, lyrically revolving around lovesickness and the pain of separation from a loved one. The song represented Albania in the Eurovision Song Contest 2008 in Belgrade, Serbia, after winning the country's pre-selection competition Festivali i Këngës 46. The country reached the 17th place in a field of 25, gathering a total of 55 points. During her dark-themed show, Boka was on stage accompanied by three instrumentalists, while the LED screens displayed various violet and yellow-coloured hearts.

== Background and composition ==
In 2007, Olta Boka was announced as one of the contestants selected to compete in the 46th edition of Festivali i Këngës, a competition to determine Albania's entrant for the Eurovision Song Contest 2008. Following the competition's rules, the lyrics of the participating entries had to be in the Albanian language. Boka took part with the song "Zemrën e lamë peng", composed by Adrian Hila and written by Pandi Laço. For the purpose of the singer's Eurovision Song Contest participation, the song was remastered and reworked in Italy with few modifications leading to a more "rhythmic version". Musically, it was described as a ballad, which lyrically revolves around lovesickness and the pain of separation.

== Release and promotion ==
The song was released as a CD single in 2008 through Radio Televizioni Shqiptar (RTSH), while approximately 1000 promotional CD's were distributed to radio stations. An accompanying music video for the song premiered prior to the start of the Eurovision Song Contest 2008. For promotional purposes, Boka made diverse live appearances on multiple occasions in April that year to perform the song, including in Azerbaijan, Georgia and Ukraine. In the same month, she also appeared to perform on the Turkish television shows Aynadan yansıyanlar and Michael show. Israel's representative for the Eurovision Song Contest 2008, Boaz Ma'uda, released in 2009 a Hebrew version of the song titled "Sha'ar Libach" (שער ליבך).

== At Eurovision ==
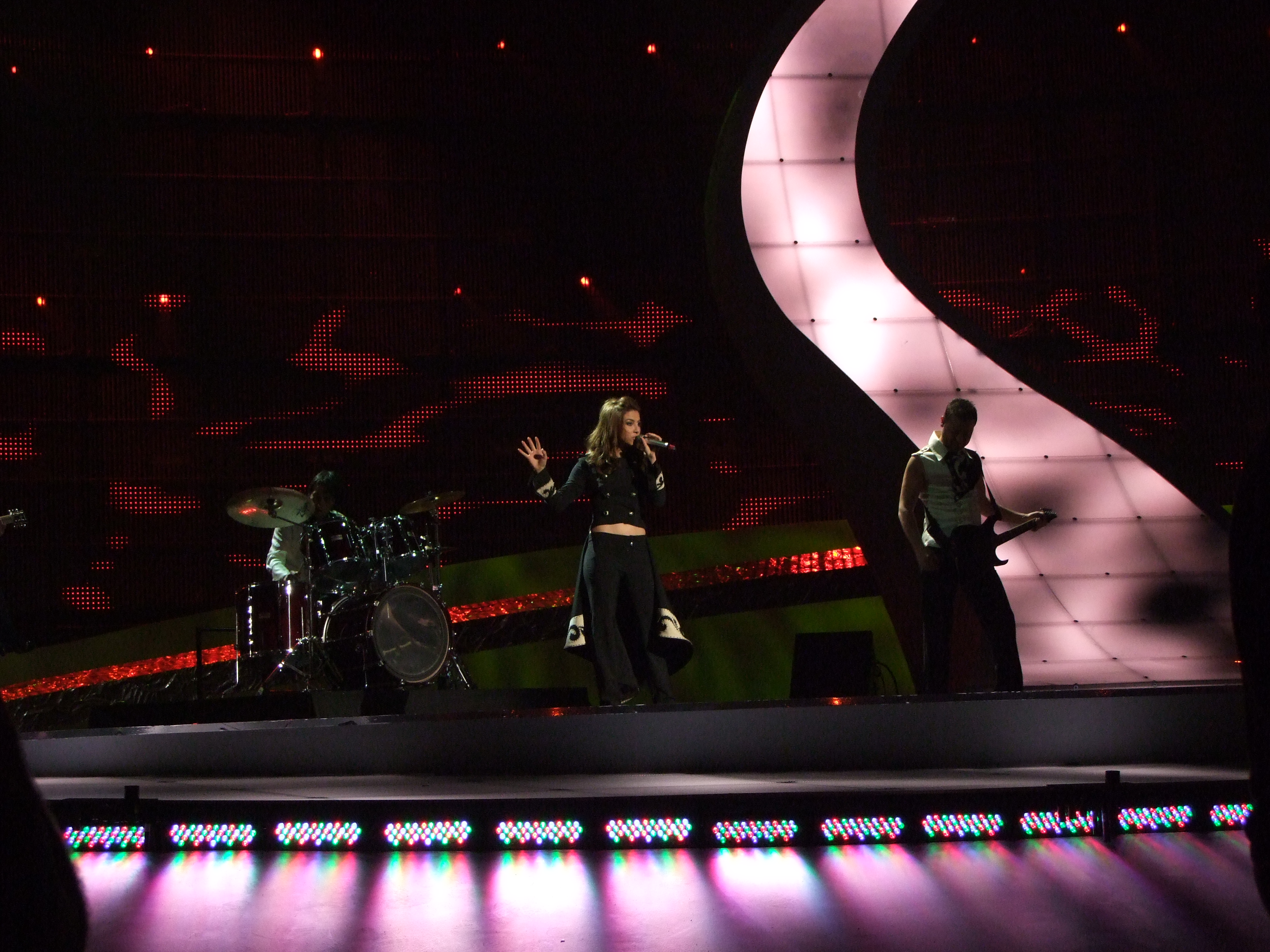
Boka and her background instrumentalists during the second semi-final of the Eurovision Song Contest 2008.

=== Festivali i Këngës ===
The national broadcaster of Albania, Radio Televizioni Shqiptar (RTSH), organised the 46th edition of Festivali i Këngës to determine the country's participant for the Eurovision Song Contest 2008. The former consisted of two semi-finals on 14 and 15 December, and the grand final on 16 December 2007, which included Boka being chosen to represent the country in the contest, after the votes of an expert jury were combined, resulting in 67 points. Boka's victory was surrounded by controversy after several observers accused the Radio Televizioni Shqiptar (RTSH) of conspiracy and manipulation.

=== Belgrade ===
The 53rd edition of the Eurovision Song Contest took place in Belgrade, Serbia, and consisted of two semi-finals on 20 and 22 May, and the grand final on 24 May 2008. According to the Eurovision rules at the time, each participating country, apart from the host country and the "Big Four", consisting of France, Germany, Spain, and the United Kingdom, were required to qualify from one of the two semi-finals to compete for the grand final. However, the top ten countries from the respective semi-final progressed to the grand final. On 28 January 2008, it was announced that "Zemrën e lamë peng" would be performed in the second semi-final of the contest.

Albania performed sixth in the second semi-final, following Lithuania and preceding Switzerland, and qualified for the grand final in ninth place with 67 points. At the grand final, it performed third, following United Kingdom and preceding Germany. Albania reached the 17th place in a field of 25 with 55 points. During her dark-themed show of the song, Boka was accompanied on stage by two guitarists and a drummer. The LED screens in the background displayed various violet and yellow-toned hearts throughout the performance.

== Track listing ==
- CD
  1. "Zemrën e lamë peng" – 2:57
- Digital download
  1. "Zemrën e lamë peng (Festivali i Këngës)" – 3:28

== Release history ==
Region	Date	Format	Label	Ref.
Various	2008	CD	RTSH	
Various	14 February 2018	Digital download	Broken AL; RTSH	
