= Tefta Radi =

Albanian journalist and news presenter (born 1952)

- Born: 19 January 1952 (age 73); Gjirokastër, PR Albania
- Education: University of Tirana
- Occupation(s): Journalist, news anchor, documentary producer
- Years active: 1974–present
- Spouse: Françesk Radi

Tefta Radi (born 19 January 1952) is an Albanian journalist, former news presenter and documentary producer. She worked for over two decades at Albanian Radio and Television (RTSH), where she was involved in news broadcasting and production.

== Life and career ==
Radi graduated in Albanian Language and Literature from the Faculty of Philology at the University of Tirana.

She began her career at RTSH as a journalist and news presenter. Over the span of more than 23 years, she contributed to the broadcaster's central news editions.

Radi has also produced documentaries focusing on various Albanian cultural and literary figures, including Martin Camaj and Lazër Radi.

== Personal life ==
Tefta Radi was married to the Albanian singer-songwriter Françesk Radi (1950–2017).

Following his death, she moved to Melbourne, Australia, where she lives with her family.
