= Anjeza Shahini =

Albanian singer

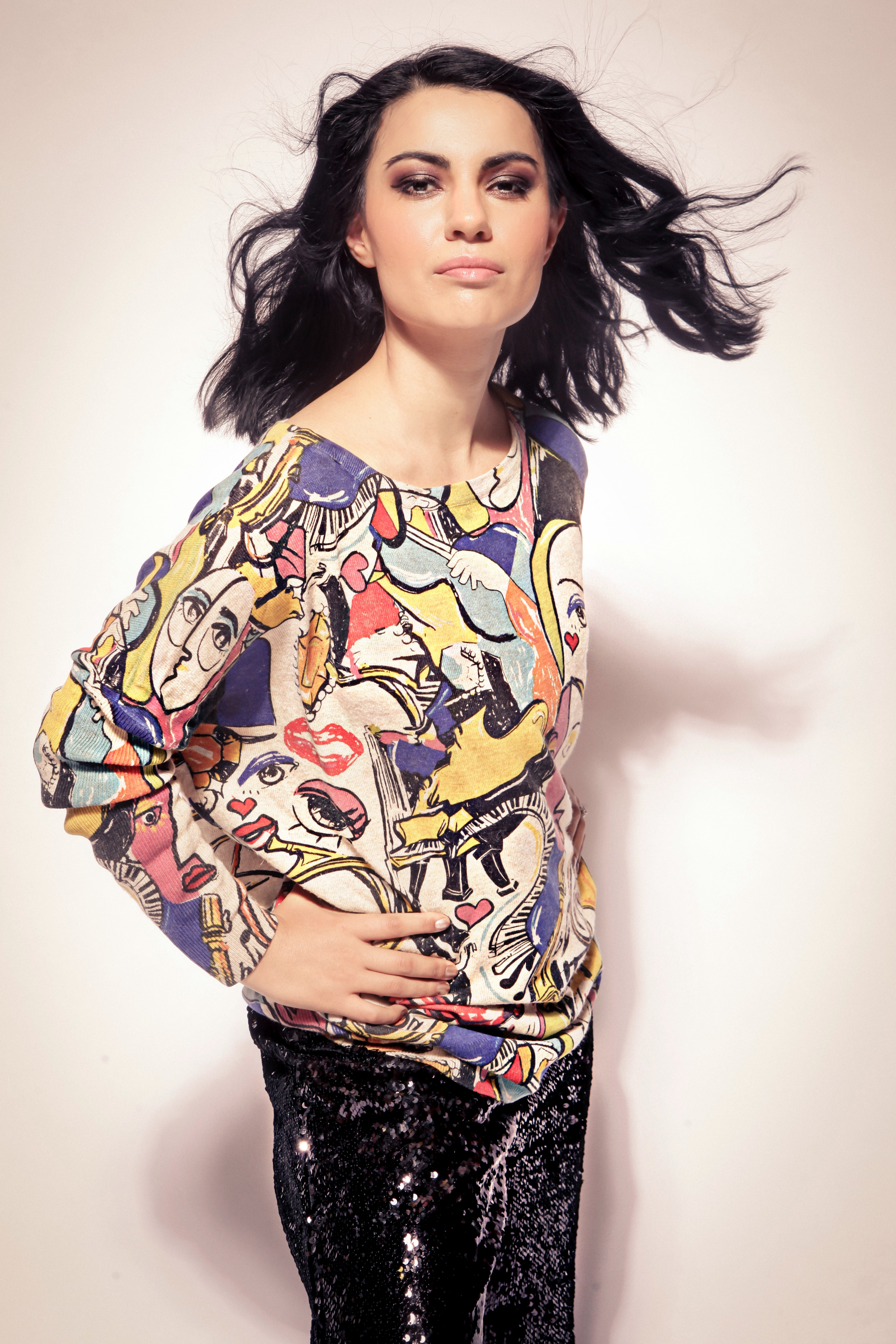
- Shahini in 2017

Background information
- Born: 4 May 1987 (age 39); Tirana, Albania
- Genres: Pop; soul; alternative rock; Albanian pop
- Occupations: Singer; songwriter
- Years active: 2003–present

Anjeza Shahini (Albanian pronunciation: [aˈɲɛza ʃaˈhini]; born 4 May 1987) is an Albanian singer. She represented Albania at the Eurovision Song Contest 2004, after winning the 42nd edition of Festivali i Këngës, becoming the first Albanian representative at the contest.

== Career ==
=== 2003–2009 ===
Anjeza Shahini was born on 4 May 1987 in the city of Tirana, then part of the People's Socialist Republic of Albania, present Albania. In 2003, Shahini won the first edition of "Ethet e së premtes mbrëma". In later 2003, along with 29 other singers, she competed in Festivali I Këngës 42 with the song "Imazhi yt". After two preliminary rounds, Shahini reached the final on 20 December, at the end of which, hosts Adi Krasta and Ledina Çelo presented her as the winner of the combined jury and televote. That meant she would represent Albania in the Eurovision Song Contest 2004, in Albania's debut year in the competition. For the ESC finals, a three-minute English version of the song entitled "The Image of You" was created. Anjeza sang in the semi-final of ESC on 12 May 2004, and finished fourth out of twenty-two. This top-ten finish, secured Anjeza a place in the final where on 15 May she competed with contestants from twenty-four other countries and finished seventh with a total of 106 points.

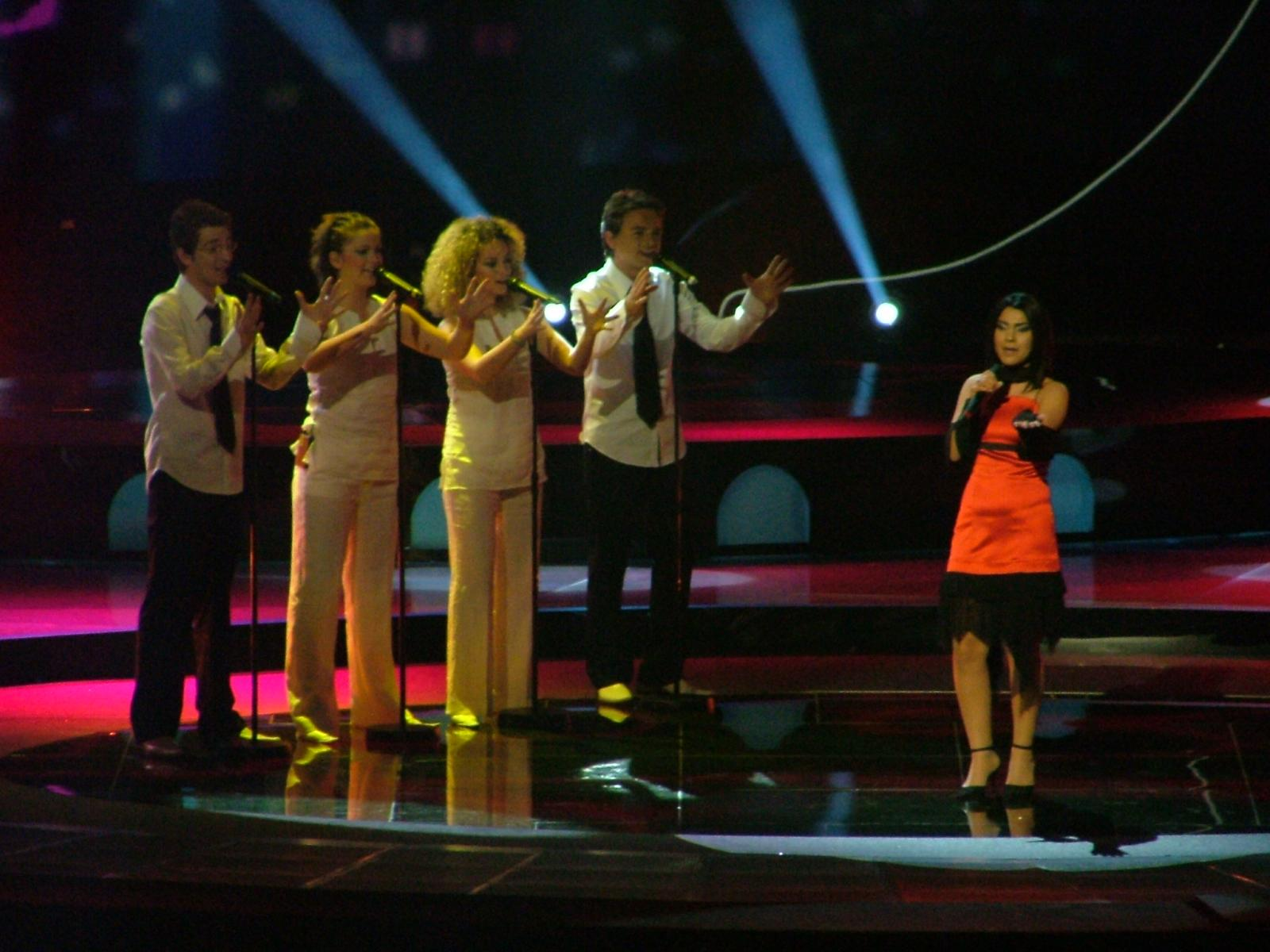
Anjeza Shahini in the Eurovision 2004 final

In 2004, Anjeza recorded a song ("Në mes nesh") with Kosovo-Albanian band Marigona. In 2005 she signed a contract with an artist management agency based in Vienna. During her two years in Vienna she continued private studies in music and collaborated with the well known Austrian producer Harald Hanisch, including the song "Pse Ndal" (Why Stop) which was used at the Albanian National Song Festival (Festivali i Këngës), the Albanian selection process for the Eurovision Song Contest. Anjeza Shahini made it through the two semi-finals to the last twenty at the National Final and was one of the favourites to win. However, at the final, which aired on 18 December 2005, the winner was announced as the song "Zjarr e ftohtë", sung by Luiz Ejlli.

On 3 June 2006, Anjeza Shahini was a special guest performer at the Euro Video Grand Prix contest, which was held in Albania. She opened the contest with the song "Welcome to Europe".

In 2007, Anjeza returned to Albania and signed a contract with the Albanian record label "Eurostar". She performed at Këngët e Shekullit 2, a successful series on TV Klan consisting of remakes of the best Albanian songs from the past century. She took part in Kënga Magjike 2007 with the song "Nxënësja më e mirë" ("The best student"), where the other singers' votes landed her in 4th place, but she did receive the critics' award.

In August 2008, Anjeza Shahini released her first album, Erdhi momenti, containing only new songs, all in Albanian. Some of the songs were composed by Adrian Hila, but she also collaborated with other well known composers such as Pirro Çako , Alfred Kacinari and Genti Myftaraj and some of the lyrics were written by Anjeza's sister, Bela. The songs "Erdhi Momenti" and "Lot Pendimi" were promoted with a music video produced by Max Production.

Anjeza Shahini took part in Festivali i Këngës 48 with the ballad "Në pasqyrë" (In the mirror), placing second.

=== 2010s ===
In 2010, Shahini finished her contract with Eurostar and became an independent artist. In the same year she completed her studies in International Relations at the European University of Tirana. In 2011, she participated for the first time in Top Fest performing a duet with Kosovo band Dren Abazi & Zig Zag Orchestra. Their song "Ti dhe une" got "Best Interpretation" award. A music video was released after in partnership with "PinkMoon" production. In 2012, she released the ballad "Te desha shume", composed by Endrit Shani and produced by Sebastian Video Production.

Anjeza Shahini was again very close to winning ""Festivali I Kenges"" in 2013 with the song "LOVE", but the jury placed her second.

Anjeza Shahini was a guest in the new release of the German artist Martin Kilger in the song "Kastanien Lied" a song dedicated to Albania, she plays the role of Albanian girl, singing her part in the Albanian language.

During 2014 she released three singles in collaboration with the songwriter Mario Deda. Together they produced "Ujë në shkretëtirë" a triphop ballad. The video was produced in partnership with ID Production. Soon that year they released the song "Magnet" a project supported by an Albanian development company. The video produced by Entermedia showcases tall and new buildings of Tirana projecting a new, futuristic capital city of Albania, (electronic pop-dance).

In October 2014, Shahini released the song "Energji" (Energy), an electronic pop-drum & bass, the song was performed at Kenga Magjike and received the "Best New Trend" award.

Anjeza Shahini took a break from her music career in 2015 with a "Just Married" status she began a new life in the UK, whilst also completing her postgraduate in ""Events Management, Marketing and Communication"" in London. Anjeza went back to Albania for a short appearance on Top Channel on show Adi Krasta Show where she talked about her new life and where she also performed a few songs including one of her biggest hits in the solo version "Ti Dhe Une".

Anjeza appeared on the BBC Eurovision 2017 semi-final show with Scott Mills and Lucie Jones and performed at the second annual Eurostarz event in London, together with other Eurovision former acts, including Anne Marie David, Kurt Calleja, Mihai Traistariu, Karl William Lund and Salena Mastroianni.

=== 2018–2020s ===
Anjeza Shahini took another TV break after becoming a new mum in 2018, but in the meantime she went to co-write her own music with drummer Chris Turton who then she created a duo band with, called Commoncranes, the band grew into a five-piece band and together they released a few singles, including "State Of Mind", "Make More Music", "Left To Say", "In Hell" and more but, Anjeza kept the band out of TV attention whilst experiencing grassroots in the North West England. She reintroduced the band also for her fans in Albania as Ani + The Cranes after the pandemic. She wrote and co- produced with Tim Nova 31Twelve Records the singles "Giving Up On Diamonds", "Figuring Out" and Happy Birthday To Me" released throughout 2023/2024

In February 2023 she also released an Albanian new song called "Më të mirë më bëre ti", the song was distributed independently on all music platforms under Anjeza Shahini.

In October 7, 2023, Shahini co-hosted, alongside Adi Krasta and Besim Dina, the second night of the Kosovan version of Festivali i Këngës, at its inaugural edition.

April 2024 Anjeza Shahini was invited to collaborate with Modelsksi Music (a classical and Jazz orchestra ran by musical director Jan Modelski). She performed her new and old repertoire merged together on their show held at Storyhouse April 30 accompanied by Chester Big Band Orchestra .

== Discography ==
=== Albums ===
- Erdhi Momenti (2008)

=== Singles ===
- Nëse të ndodh (2003)
- The Image of You (2004)
- Mes nesh ft. Marigona Band (2004)
- Pse ndal (2005)
- Welcome to Europe (2006)
- Nxënësja më e mirë (2007)
- Ne pasqyrë (2009)
- Ti dhe unë ft. Dren Abazi & ZZOrchestra (2011)
- Të desha shume (2012)
- Nesër nuk do të jetë njësoj (2012)
- Love (2012)
- Ujë në shkretëtirë (2014)
- Magnet (2014)
- Energji (2014)
- Neser nuk do te jete njesoj (2013)
- Më të mirë më bëre ti (2024

Guest appearance

- Kastanien Lied (2013)

Soundtracks

- Dashuria e Bjeshkëve te Nemuna 2 (2013 film)

Under Ani + The Cranes2022/2024

- In Hell
- Left to say
- Happy Birthday To Me
- Make More Music
- Giving Up On Diamonds
- Figuring Out
- State of mind

== Awards ==
Festivali i Këngës

Year	Nominee / work	Award	Result
2003	"The Image of You"	First Prize	Won
2008	"Në pasqyrë"	Contestant	2nd
2012	"Love"	Contestant	2nd

Kënga Magjike

Year	Nominee / work	Award	Result
2007	"Nxënësja më e mirë"	Critic Prize	Won
2014	"Energji"	Trend Prize	Won

Zhurma Show Awards

Year	Nominee / work	Award	Result
2009	"'Erdhi momenti'"	Best Rock	Nominated

Netët e Klipt Shqiptar

Year	Nominee / work	Award	Result
2010	"Lotë pendimi"	Best Performer	Won

Top Fest

Year	Nominee / work	Award	Result
2012	"Ti dhe unë (ft. Dren Abazi)"	Best Performer	Won

Video Fest Awards

Year	Nominee / work	Award	Result
2012	"Ti dhe unë (ft. Dren Abazi)"	Best Collaboration	Nominated

Awards and achievements
Preceded by Mira Konçi with Brënda vetes më merr	Festivali i Këngës; Winner; 2003	Succeeded by Ledina Çelo with Nesër shkoj
Preceded by none (Debut entry)	Albania in the Eurovision Song Contest; 2004	Succeeded by Ledina Çelo with Tomorrow I Go
