= Albania in the Eurovision Song Contest 2004 =

- Eurovision Song Contest 2004
- Participating broadcaster: Radio Televizioni Shqiptar (RTSH)
- Country: Albania
- Selection process: Festivali i Këngës 42
- Selection date: 20 December 2003

Competing entry
- Song: "The Image of You"
- Artist: Anjeza Shahini
- Songwriters: Edmond Zhulali; Agim Doçi

Placement
- Semi-final result: Qualified (4th, 167 points)
- Final result: 7th, 106 points

Participation chronology

Albania was represented at the Eurovision Song Contest 2004 with the song "The Image of You", composed by Edmond Zhulali, with lyrics by Agim Doçi, and performed by Anjeza Shahini. The Albanian participating broadcaster, Radio Televizioni Shqiptar (RTSH), selected its entry through the national selection competition Festivali i Këngës in December 2003. This marked the first time that Albania participated in the Eurovision Song Contest.

The nation was drawn to compete in the semi-final of the contest, which took place on 12 May 2004. Performing as number 13, it was announced among the top 10 entries of the semi-final and therefore qualified to compete in the final. In the final on 15 May, Albania performed as number nine and placed seventh out of the 24 participating countries, scoring 106 points.

== Background ==
The European Broadcasting Union (EBU) announced in 2003 that Albania would debut at the Eurovision Song Contest 2004. Radio Televizioni Shqiptar (RTSH) had previously planned to debut at the Eurovision Song Contest in 2003, however, it was unable to take part that year after the EBU decided that too many countries would be relegated from participation in 2003 if the country took part. RTSH chose the annual competition Festivali i Këngës as the selection method to determine its entry in the contest.

== Before Eurovision ==
=== Festivali i Këngës ===
RTSH organised the 42nd edition of Festivali i Këngës to determine its entry for the Eurovision Song Contest 2004. The competition consisted of two semi-finals on 18 and 19 December, respectively, and the grand final on 20 December 2003. The three live shows were hosted by Albanian singer Ledina Çelo and presenter Adi Krasta.

==== Competing entries ====
Participants
Artist(s)	Song
Andi Kongo	"Sikur të rroja sa kjo botë"
Anila Jonuzi	"E kam një sekret"
Anisa Dervina	"Sytë e zemrës"
Anjeza Shahini	"Imazhi yt"
Arbër Arapi	"Bota ime"
Arjan Hasanbelliu	"Nata"
Aurel Thëllimi	"Dashuri dhe lojë"
Bashkim Rodoni	"Rritu pa mbarim"
Edmond Mancaku	"Trill vjeshte"
Elvana Gjata	"Pranë teje"
Eneda Tarifa	"Qëndroj"
Erida Rexhepi	"Kthehu"
Ermiona Lekbello	"Ç'punë ke ti me dashurinë"
Evis Mula	"E dashuruar"
Fazile Syla	"Jeto jetën tënde"
Françesk Radi	"Syri i saj po më verbon"
Gjergj Jorgaqi	"Dua dhe s'dua"
Klajdi Musabelliu	"Një shpresë për jetën time"
Kozma Dushi	"E nesërmja tjetër kujt i takon"
Kujtim Prodani	"Ju të dashurat e mia"
Mariza Ikonomi	"Mbi urë"
Orges Toçi	"Eja"
Rijet Pirani	"Ike"
Rosela Gjylbegu	"Hirushja"
Rovena Dilo	"Njëmijë zemra"
Rudi and Ingrid Jushi	"Me ty"
Saimir Braho	"Fjala"
Saimir Çili	"Sa herë vjen pranvera"
Voltan Prodani	"Kthehu dhe kujtohu"

==== Shows ====
===== Semi-finals =====
The semi-finals of Festivali i Këngës took place on 18 December and 19 December 2003, respectively. 14 contestants participated in the first semi-final and 15 in the second semi-final, with the highlighted ones progressing to the grand final.

Semi-final 1–18 December 2003
R/O	Artist(s)	Song	Result
1	Orges Toçi	"Eja"	Qualified
2	Fazile Syla	"Jeto jetën tënde"	—N/a
3	Arjan Hasanbelliu	"Nata"	—N/a
4	Elvana Gjata	"Pranë teje"	—N/a
5	Rudi and Ingrid Jushi	"Me ty"	Qualified
6	Voltan Prodani	"Kthehu dhe kujtohu"	Qualified
7	Aurel Thëllimi	"Dashuri dhe lojë"	—N/a
8	Arbër Arapi	"Bota ime"	Qualified
9	Kozma Dushi	"E nesërmja tjetër kujt i takon"	Qualified
10	Ermiona Lekbello	"Ç'punë ke ti me dashurinë"	Qualified
11	Klajdi Musabelliu	"Një shpresë për jetën time"	Qualified
12	Evis Mula	"E dashuruar"	Qualified
13	Saimir Çili	"Sa herë vjen pranvera"	—N/a
14	Rovena Dilo	"Njëmijë zemra"	Qualified

Semi-final 2–19 December 2003
R/O	Artist	Song	Result
1	Andi Kongo	"Sikur të rroja sa kjo botë"	Qualified
2	Erida Rexhepi	"Kthehu"	—N/a
3	Kujtim Prodani	"Ju të dashurat e mia"	Qualified
4	Edmond Mancaku	"Trill vjeshte"	Qualified
5	Anila Jonuzi	"E kam një sekret"	—N/a
6	Gjergj Jorgaqi	"Dua dhe s'dua"	—N/a
7	Anisa Dervina	"Sytë e zemrës"	Qualified
8	Rijet Pirani	"Ike"	—N/a
9	Anjeza Shahini	"Imazhi yt"	Qualified
10	Bashkim Rodoni	"Rritu pa mbarim"	—N/a
11	Eneda Tarifa	"Qëndroj"	Qualified
12	Rosela Gjylbegu	"Hirushja"	Qualified
13	Françesk Radi	"Syri i saj po më verbon"	Qualified
14	Saimir Braho	"Fjala"	—N/a
15	Mariza Ikonomi	"Mbi urë"	Qualified

===== Final =====
The grand final of Festivali i Këngës took place on 20 December 2003. The results of the competition were determined by a 50/50 combination of votes from a jury panel and a public televote. "Imazhi yt" performed by Anjeza Shahini emerged as the winning entry, and was simultaneously announced as the Albanian entry for the Eurovision Song Contest 2004.

Key: Winner Second place Third place

Final–20 December 2003
R/O	Artist	Song	Place
1	Arbër Arapi	"Bota ime"	—N/a
2	Kujtim Prodani	"Ju të dashurat e mia"	—N/a
3	Anisa Dervina	"Sytë e zemrës"	—N/a
4	Françesk Radi	"Syri i saj po më verbon"	—N/a
5	Rudi and Ingrid Jushi	"Me ty"	—N/a
6	Edmond Mancaku	"Trill vjeshte"	—N/a
7	Evis Mula	"E dashuruar"	—N/a
8	Kozma Dushi	"E nesërmja tjetër kujt i takon"	—N/a
9	Klajdi Musabelliu	"Një shpresë për jetën time"	—N/a
10	Rovena Dilo	"Njëmijë zemra"	—N/a
11	Mariza Ikonomi	"Mbi urë"	2
12	Anjeza Shahini	"Imazhi yt"	1
13	Eneda Tarifa	"Qëndroj"	—N/a
14	Rosela Gjylbegu	"Hirushja"	3
15	Ermiona Lekbello	"Ç'punë ke ti me dashurinë"	—N/a
16	Orges Toçe	"Eja"	—N/a
17	Voltan Prodani	"Kthehu dhe kujto"	—N/a
18	Andi Kongo	"Sikur të rroja sa kjo botë"	—N/a

== At Eurovision ==
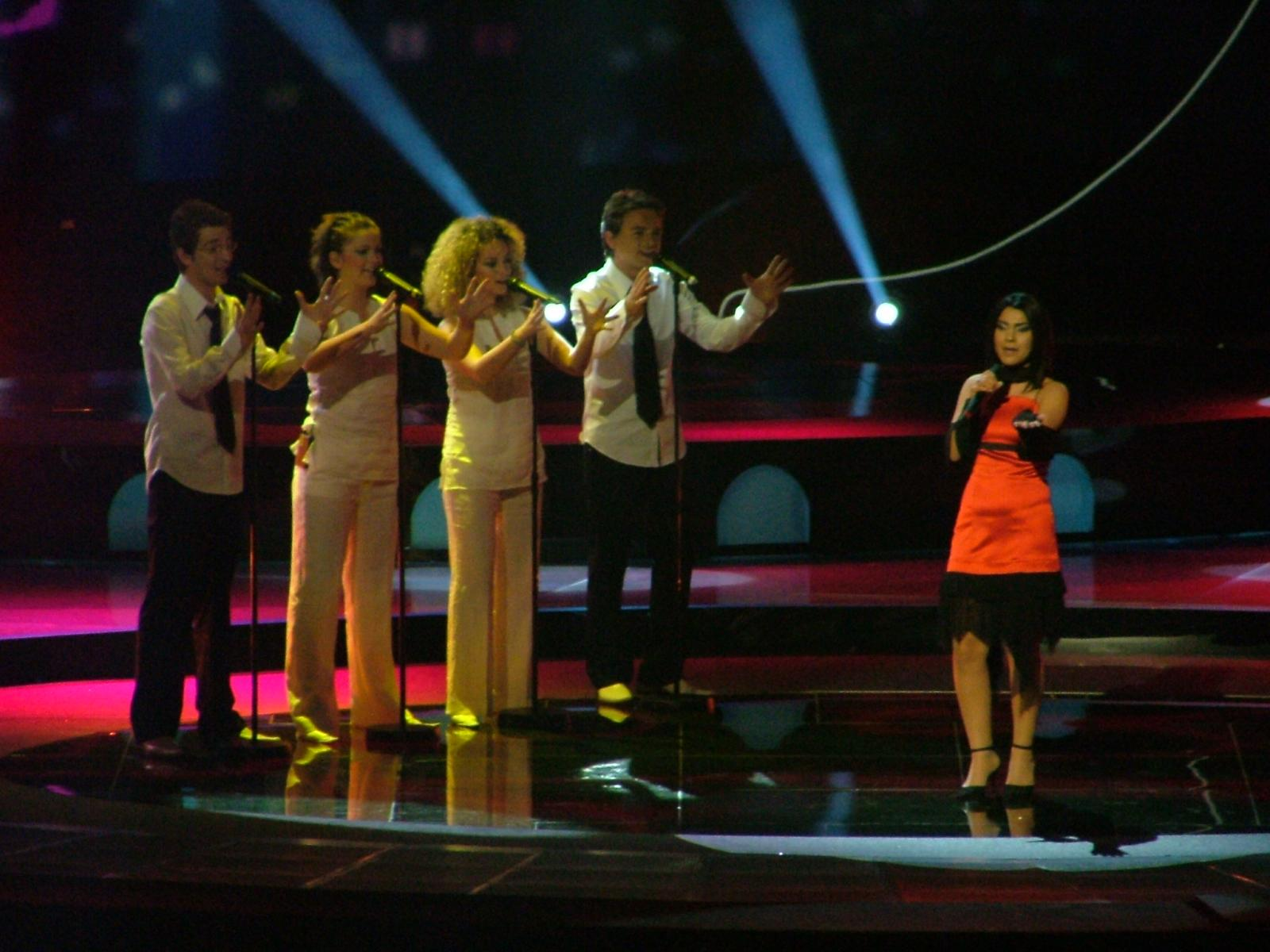
Anjeza Shahini performing during the grand-final of the Eurovision Song Contest 2004.

The Eurovision Song Contest 2004 took place at Abdi İpekçi Arena in Istanbul, Turkey, and consisted of a semi-final on 12 May and the grand final on 15 May 2004. For the first time, a semi-final round was introduced in order to accommodate the influx of nations that wanted to compete in the contest. According to the Eurovision rules, all participating countries, except the host nation and the "Big Four", consisting of France, Germany, Spain and the United Kingdom, were required to qualify from the semi-final to compete for the final, although the top 10 countries from the semi-final progress to the final. A debuting country, Albania was set to compete in the semi-final of the Eurovision Song Contest 2004 at position 13, following Lithuania and preceding Cyprus. At the end of the show, the nation was announced among the top 10 entries of the semi-final and therefore qualified to compete in the grand final of the contest. In the grand final, it was announced that it would be performing ninth, following Germany and preceding Ukraine.

=== Voting ===
The tables below visualise a breakdown of points awarded to Albania in the semi-final and grand final of the Eurovision Song Contest 2004, as well as by the nation on both occasions. In the semi-final, the nation finished in fourth place with a total of 167 points, including 12 from Macedonia and 10 from Switzerland. In the grand final, Albania finished in seventh position, being awarded a total of 106 points, including 12 points from Macedonia and 10 points from both Greece and Malta. The nation awarded its 12 points to Greece in both the semi-final and final of the contest.

Following the release of the televoting figures by the EBU after the conclusion of the competition, it was revealed that a total of 1,071 televotes were cast in Albania during the two shows: 259 votes during the semi-final and 812 votes during the final.

==== Points awarded to Albania ====
Points awarded to Albania (Semi-final)
Score	Country
12 points	Macedonia
10 points	Switzerland
8 points	Germany; Greece; Malta; Norway
7 points	Austria; Croatia; Denmark; Sweden
6 points	Andorra; Bosnia and Herzegovina; Finland; Romania; Serbia and Montenegro; Turkey; United Kingdom
5 points	Belgium; Ireland; Latvia; Netherlands; Slovenia
4 points	Iceland; Israel
3 points	Monaco
2 points	Portugal; Spain
1 point	Cyprus; Estonia; Ukraine

Points awarded to Albania (Final)
Score	Country
12 points	Macedonia
10 points	Greece; Malta
8 points	Serbia and Montenegro
7 points	Sweden; Switzerland
6 points	Croatia; Turkey
5 points	Austria; Germany
4 points	Bosnia and Herzegovina; Denmark; Iceland; Slovenia
3 points	Finland; Norway
2 points	Ireland
1 point	Belgium; France; Latvia; Netherlands; Romania; United Kingdom

==== Points awarded by Albania ====
Points awarded by Albania (Semi-final)
Score	Country
12 points	Greece
10 points	Bosnia and Herzegovina
8 points	Macedonia
7 points	Finland
6 points	Malta
5 points	Israel
4 points	Serbia and Montenegro
3 points	Ukraine
2 points	Monaco
1 point	Estonia

Points awarded by Albania (Final)
Score	Country
12 points	Greece
10 points	Bosnia and Herzegovina
8 points	Turkey
7 points	Serbia and Montenegro
6 points	Macedonia
5 points	Ukraine
4 points	Sweden
3 points	Malta
2 points	Germany
1 point	France
