= Tomorrow I Go =

2005 song by Ledina Çelo

Single by Ledina Çelo
- Released: 29 April 2005
- Genre: Dance
- Length: 3:01
- Label: CMC
- Composer(s): Adrian Hila
- Lyricist(s): Pandi Laço

Ledina Çelo singles chronology
"Të dua se je ti" (2003)	"Tomorrow I Go" (2005)	"Lojë dashurie" (2005)

Eurovision Song Contest 2005 entry
- Country: Albania
- Artist(s): Ledina Çelo
- Language: English
- Composer(s): Adrian Hila
- Lyricist(s): Pandi Laço

Finals performance
- Final result: 16th
- Final points: 53

Entry chronology
- ◄ "The Image of You" (2004)
- "Zjarr e ftohtë" (2006) ►

"Tomorrow I Go" is a song by Albanian singer Ledina Çelo composed by Adi Hila and written by Pandi Laço. The song was released as part of a CD compilation on 29 April 2005 by CMC Records. Musically, it is an English-language folk-influenced dance song that incorporates traditional Albanian sounds in the instrumentation. Lyrically, the song discusses the themes of love and marriage, while also reflecting the story a story of a woman's wedding. "Tomorrow I Go" represented Albania in the Eurovision Song Contest 2005 in Kyiv, Ukraine, after Çelo won the pre-selection competition, Festivali i Këngës 43, with the song's Albanian-language version "Nesër shkoj". The country reached the 16th place in a field of 24, gathering a total of 53 points. During her Albanian-themed performance of the song, Çelo was accompanied by four female backing violinists and a male drummer.

== Background and composition ==
In 2004, Ledina Çelo was announced as one of the contestants selected to compete in the 43rd edition of Festivali i Këngës, a competition to determine Albania's entrant for the Eurovision Song Contest 2005. Following the competition's rules, the lyrics of the participating entries had to be in the Albanian language. Çelo took part with the song "Nesër shkoj", composed by Adrian Hila and written by Pandi Laço. For the purpose of the singer's Eurovision Song Contest participation, "Nesër shkoj" was remastered and translated to "Tomorrow I Go". Musically, it is an English-language ethnic-dance song incorporating traditional Albanian elements. Its instrumentation consists of various traditional Albanian instruments, including the tupan and çifteli. Lyrically, the song discusses the themes of love and marriage, capturing the story of a woman talking to her mother before her wedding.

== Release and promotion ==
"Tomorrow I Go" was initially released on 29 April 2005, as part of the Eurovision Song Contest: Kyiv 2005 compilation album on CD through CMC Records. On 14 February 2018, the song was made available for digital download by Radio Televizioni Shqiptar (RTSH) and Broken AL Audio. An accompanying music video for the song was premiered prior to the start of the Eurovision Song Contest in May 2005.

== At Eurovision ==
=== Festivali i Këngës ===
The national broadcaster of Albania, Radio Televizioni Shqiptar (RTSH), organised the 43rd edition of Festivali i Këngës to determine Albania's representative for the Eurovision Song Contest 2005. The competition consisted of two semi-finals on 16 and 17 December, respectively, and the grand final on 18 December 2004, which also included Çelo being chosen to represent Albania in the contest, after the jury's votes and the televote were combined.

=== Kyiv ===
The 50th edition of the Eurovision Song Contest took place in Kyiv, Ukraine, and consisted of a semi-final on 19 May and the grand final three days later on 21 May 2005. According to the Eurovision rules, all participating countries, except the host nation and the "Big Four", consisting of France, Germany, Spain and the United Kingdom, were required to qualify from the semi-final to compete for the final, although the top 10 countries from the semi-final progress to the final. Due to the top 11 result in the previous year, Albania automatically qualified for the contest's grand final and performed eighth, following Moldova and preceding Cyprus. In the grand final, Albania finished in 16th place, being awarded a total of 53 points. During her red and black-themed performance of the song, Çelo was accompanied on stage by four female backing violinists and a male drummer dressed in traditional Albanian-inspired costumes.

== Track listing ==
- Digital download
1. "Nesër shkoj (Festivali i Këngës)" – 3:37

== Release history ==
Release dates and formats for "Tomorrow I Go"
Region	Date	Format	Label	Ref.
Various	14 February 2018	Digital download	Broken AL; RTSH	
