= Hear My Plea =

2007 song by Frederik Ndoci

Single by Frederik Ndoci
- Released: 20 April 2007
- Genre: Pop
- Length: 3:03
- Label: CMC
- Composer(s): Adrian Hila
- Lyricist(s): Pandi Laço

Frederik Ndoci singles chronology
"Kitara e paqës" (1996)	"Hear My Plea" (2007)	"Oh jeta ime" (2011)

Music video
- "Hear My Plea" on YouTube

Eurovision Song Contest 2007 entry
- Country: Albania
- Artist(s): Frederik Ndoci
- Languages: English
- Composer(s): Adrian Hila
- Lyricist(s): Pandi Laço

Finals performance
- Semi-final result: 17th
- Semi-final points: 49

Entry chronology
- ◄ "Zjarr e Ftohtë" (2006)
- "Zemrën e lamë peng" (2008) ►

"Hear My Plea" is a song by Albanian singer and songwriter Frederik Ndoci. It was issued as part of a CD compilation on 20 April 2007 by CMC Records. The English-language song was written by Pandi Laço and composed by Adrian Hila. "Hear My Plea" represented Albania in the Eurovision Song Contest 2007 in Helsinki, Finland, after Ndoci won the pre-selection competition, Festivali i Këngës 45, with the song's Albanian-language version "Balada e Gurit". The country failed to qualify for the grand final in 17th place, marking its second non-qualification in the contest. During his dark-themed show of the song, Ndoci was accompanied by an instrumentalist and four backing vocalists. An accompanying music video for the song premiered on the official YouTube channel of the Eurovision Song Contest on 5 April 2007.

== Background and composition ==
In 2006, Frederik Ndoci was announced as one of the contestants selected to compete in the 45th edition of Festivali i Këngës, a competition to determine Albania's entrant for the Eurovision Song Contest 2007. Following the competition's rules, the lyrics of the participating entries had to be in the Albanian language. Ndoci took part with the song "Balada e Gurit", composed by Adrian Hila and written by Pandi Laço. For the purpose of the singer's Eurovision Song Contest participation, "Balada e Gurit" was remastered and translated to "Hear My Plea". Musically, the latter is an English-language baroque-inspired dramatic pop song, which lyrically calls for pleading with an unnamed power to bring his love back to him.

== Release and promotion ==
The song was initially released on 20 April 2007 as part of the Eurovision Song Contest: Helsinki 2007 compilation album on CD through CMC Records. On 14 February 2018, it was released for digital download through Broken AL Audio and Radio Televizioni Shqiptar (RTSH). For promotional purposes, an accompanying music video for "Hear My Plea" premiered on the official YouTube channel of the Eurovision Song Contest on 5 April 2007.

== At Eurovision ==
=== Festivali i Këngës ===
The national broadcaster, Radio Televizioni Shqiptar (RTSH), organised the 45th edition of Festivali i Këngës to determine Albania's participant for the Eurovision Song Contest 2007 in Helsinki, Finland. It consisted of two semi-finals on 21 and 22 December 2006, and a grand final on 23 December, which resulted in Ndoci being chosen after the votes of an expert jury were combined, giving a total of 55 points.

=== Helsinki ===
The 52nd edition of the Eurovision Song Contest took place in Helsinki, Finland, and consisted of a semi-final on 10 May, and the grand final two days later on 12 May 2007. According to the Eurovision rules at the time, selected participating countries, apart from the host country and the "Big Four" (consisting of France, Germany, Spain, and the United Kingdom), were required to qualify from the semi-final to compete for the grand final. The top ten countries from the semi-final progressed to the grand final. Albania came 11th in the semi-final, following Netherlands and preceding Denmark, and failed to qualify for the grand final in 17th place with 49 points. During his dark blue-themed performance of the song, Ndoci was accompanied on stage by a violin player and four backing vocalists, including his wife, Aida Ndoci.

== Track listings ==
- Digital download
1. "Balada e Gurit (Festivali i Këngës)" – 4:31

== Release history ==
Release dates and formats for "Hear My Plea"
Region	Date	Format	Label	Ref.
Various	14 February 2018	Digital download	Broken AL; RTSH	
