= Euro Video Grand Prix =

The Euro Video Grand Prix was a competition to determine the best European music video held in Tirana, Albania. It was a televised event across Europe to over 200 million viewers on June 3, 2006. Each country sent their own representative to the event (like Eurovision). The contest was won jointly by Ukraine and the Czech Republic. Ukraine's co-winner, Yelena Grebenyuk, submitted a video for the song “Le Forze Del Destino”.
