= Françesk Radi =

Albanian singer (1950–2017)

- Born: 13 February 1950; Tirana, PR Albania
- Died: 3 April 2017 (aged 67); Tirana, Albania
- Education: Jordan Misja High School
- Occupations: Singer, songwriter, composer, multi-instrumentalist
- Years active: 1967–2017
- Known for: "Adresa", "Biçikleta", "Telefonatë zemrash", "Rock i burgut", "Zemër e lodhur"
- Spouse: Tefta Radi
- Children: Anjeza; Baltion
- Relatives: Ferdinand Radi (brother), Rozana Radi (niece)

Françesk "Franko" Radi (13 February 1950 – 3 April 2017) was an Albanian singer, composer, and songwriter, considered one of the early pioneers of modern pop and rock music in Albania. He is known for introducing pop-rock influences into Albanian music during the 1970s, with notable songs including "Adresa," "Biçikleta," and "Rock i burgut."

== Life and career ==
Radi was born in Tirana and raised in a culturally active family. He studied at the "Jordan Misja" Artistic High School and later at the Academy of Arts in Tirana, focusing on contrabass and other instruments.

He began his music career in 1967 as a bassist in the Big Band conducted by Gaspër Çurçia and in other formations of the Albanian Radio and Television Symphony Orchestra. Initially known for his instrumental work, Radi later emerged as a vocalist and songwriter. His early hits, "Adresa" and "Biçikleta," released in the early 1970s, were among Albania's first music videos, produced in 1972.

Radi made his songwriting debut at the 11th National Song Festival with the song "Kur dëgjojmë zëra nga bota," addressing the Vietnam War. The song was met with harsh criticism from state-controlled media for being too Western in tone and influence. As a result, he was expelled from the national orchestra and banned from public performances. He was sent for "re-education" to the town of Fushë-Arrëz, where he continued his musical activities in isolation, including the formation of a traditional music ensemble.

He returned to Tirana in the 1980s but was not reinstated to the Symphony Orchestra. From 1982, he worked with the National Circus Orchestra and later joined the Tirana Variety Show in 1985.

Following the fall of Albania's communist regime in 1991, Radi resumed public performances, composing and recording new material. His later works include "Rock i burgut," "Telefonatë zemrash," and "Zemër e lodhur." From 1992 to 2015, he worked at the Albanian Radio and Television Symphony Orchestra, first as an instrumentalist and later as a musical director.

== Musical style and influence ==
Radi is regarded as one of Albania’s first singer-songwriters, incorporating Anglo-American pop-rock influences into his music. He played various instruments, including guitar, bass, contrabass, piano, and traditional Albanian instruments such as the çifteli and sharki. His lyrics often carried social themes, and he was among the few musicians of his time to challenge cultural censorship with a modern sound.

== Personal life ==
Radi was married to Tefta Radi, an Albanian journalist and broadcaster. They had two children, Anjeza and Baltion. His brother was actor and director Ferdinand Radi, and his niece is singer and actress Rozana Radi.

== Death ==
Radi died on 3 April 2017 in Tirana after suffering a cerebral hemorrhage.

In 2018, a bronze statue was unveiled in his honor in the hills near the Artificial Lake of Tirana as a lasting tribute to his contributions to Albanian music.
