= Rovena Stefa =

Albanian singer

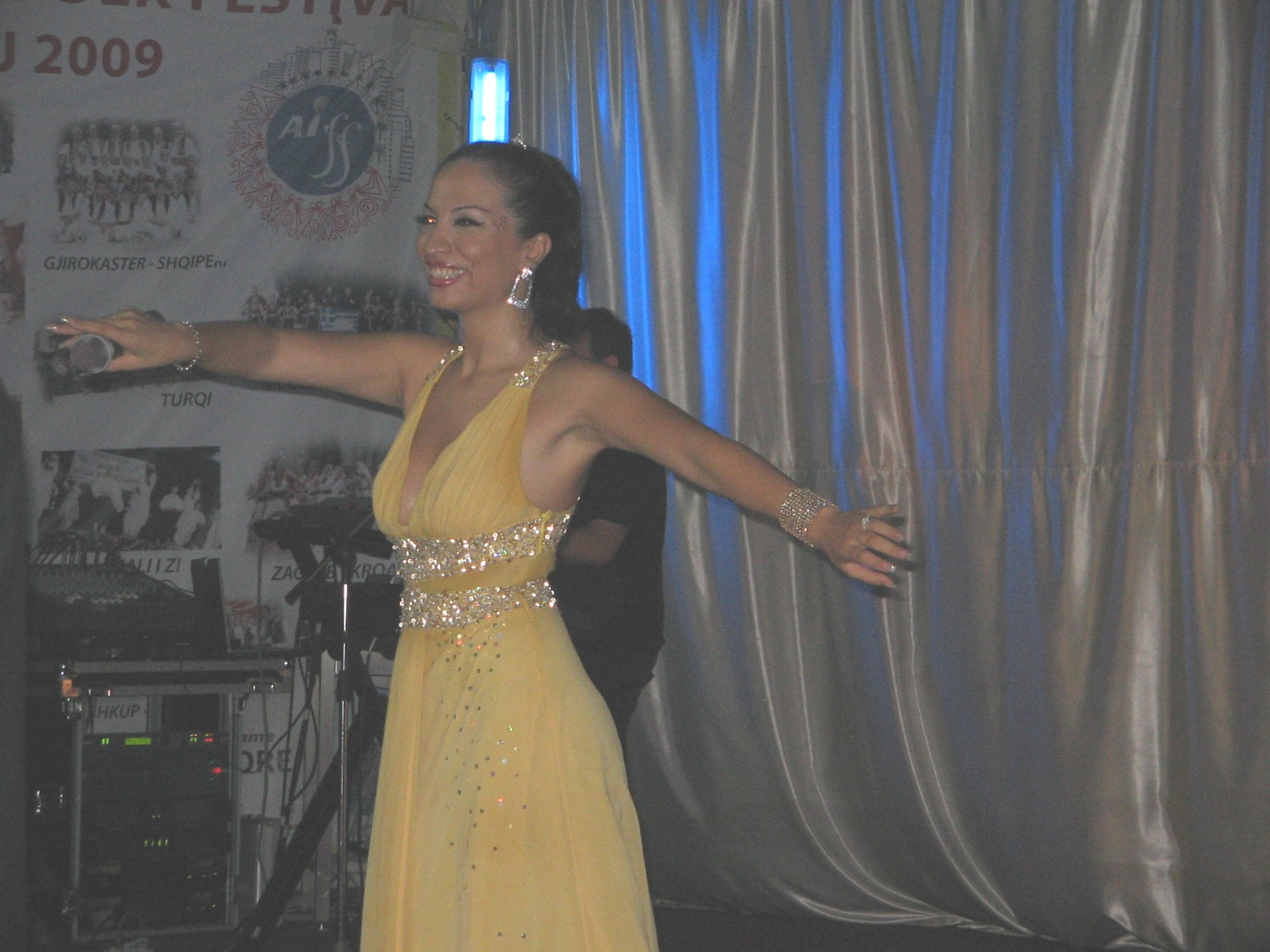

Background information
- Origin: Vlorë
- Genres: Pop music
- Occupations: Singer-songwriter, musician, actress, fashion designer,
- Instrument: Vocal
- Years active: 1995–present

Rovena Stefa (born 27 April 1979 in Fier) is an Albanian singer. Her first album Falling Snow had much success in Europe.

In 2005 and 2006 Rovena had success with the songs "Do You Come With Me", "Wedding", "With Karrocieri Hats", I'm Sweet", " Llokum", "Address Without A Name" and "Slash Dot Dash".

In 2009, she released two videos for the songs "Mall" and "Viva Eagle and Fatherland". The video for "Mall" created a controversy over its eroticism.

In the Summer of 2009 Stefa opened the "Rovena Club"; a discotheque on the coast of Durres.

In 1996, she won an award for the best interpretation song "I Am The Image" (Duet with Heriot Long) at "The Magic Song '99".

In November 2020, she was announced as the Albanian representative in the Turkvision Song Contest 2020 with the song "Zjarr". However, she withdrew from the contest in December 2020.

In 2024 she participated in Big Brother VIP Kosova 3 but she didn't make it to the final.

== Albums ==
- 2002, Bie dëborë
- 2003, Paraja
- 2004, Dasma
- 2006, Llokum
- 2008, Lum e Lum
- 2011 Degjo Rovin
- 2014 Boll me lojna

== Singles ==
- 2005, "Mos thuaj" (with Blero)
- 2007, "Për një kafe" (with Altin Shira)
- 2007, "Xhelozia" (with Duli)
- 2008, "Potpuri popullore" (Shpat Kasapi)
- 2009, "Rrofte Shqipja dhe Vata
- 2020, "Zjarr"
