= Zjarr e ftohtë =

2006 song by Luiz Ejlli

Single by Luiz Ejlli
- Released: 2006
- Genre: Pop
- Length: 3:00
- Label: RTSH
- Composer(s): Klodian Qafoku
- Lyricist(s): Floran Kondi

Eurovision Song Contest 2006 entry
- Country: Albania
- Artist(s): Luiz Ejlli
- Language: Albanian
- Composer(s): Klodian Qafoku
- Lyricist(s): Floran Kondi

Finals performance
- Semi-final result: 14th
- Semi-final points: 58

Entry chronology
- ◄ "Tomorrow I Go" (2005)
- "Hear My Plea" (2007) ►

"Zjarr e ftohtë" (Albanian: [ˈzjar ɛ ˈftɔhtə]; transl. "Fire and cold") is a song by Albanian singer Luiz Ejlli. Klodian Qafoku composed the music while Dr. Flori wrote the lyrics. Musically, it is an Albanian-language pop song incorporating a southern Albanian folklore element in its instrumentation. The song represented Albania in the Eurovision Song Contest 2006 in Athens, Greece, after winning the pre-selection competition Festivali i Këngës 44. The country failed to qualify for the grand final in fourteenth place, marking the country's first non-qualification in the contest.

During his minimalistic show on the competition, Ejlli was accompanied by three backing vocalists and two traditional Albanian instrumentalists.

== Background and composition ==
Lasting 3 minutes, "Zjarr e ftohtë" has its lyrics written by Florian Kondi. Composed by Klodian Qafoku, it is a pop song which its instrumentation features a southern Albanian folk music-esque melody. The lyrics are sung from the perspective of a man who cannot forget his former lover. He likens his predicament to feeling "fire and cold" (or "fire but still cold"), while begging her to "open [her] heart". Despite the strength of the lyrics, the song was performed in a subdued fashion. Ejlli and three backing singers barely moved from their positions, while two Albanian folk musicians provided accompaniment. Many commentators had difficulty pronouncing the song title or the performer's name. The BBC commentator, Paddy O'Connell, for example, rendered the song as "Zlar E Flot".

== At Eurovision ==
=== Festivali i Këngës ===
The national broadcaster of Albania, Radio Televizioni Shqiptar (RTSH), organised the 44th edition of Festivali i Këngës to determine the country's participant for the Eurovision Song Contest 2006. The show consisted of two semi-finals on 16 and 17 December, and a grand final on 18 December 2005, where Ejlli was chosen.

=== Athens ===
The 51st edition of the Eurovision Song Contest took place in Athens, Greece, and consisted of a semi-final on 18 May and the grand final two days later on 20 May 2006. According to the Eurovision rules at the time, selected participating countries, apart from the host country and the "Big Four" (France, Germany, Spain, and the United Kingdom), were required to qualify from the semi-final to compete for the grand final. However, the top ten countries from the semi-final progressed to the grand final. Albania performed sixth in the semi-final, following Belarus and preceding Belgium, and failed to qualify for the grand final, ending in 14th place with 58 points. During his minimalistic show of the song, Ejlli was accompanied on stage by three backing vocalists and two traditional Albanian instrumentalists.

== Track listing ==
- Digital download
1. "Zjarr e ftohtë (Festivali i Këngës)" – 3:37

== Release history ==
Region	Date	Format	Label	Ref.
Various	14 February 2018	Digital download	Broken AL; RTSH	
