= The Image of You =

2004 song by Anjeza Shahini

Single by Anjeza Shahini
- Released: 2004
- Genre: Pop
- Length: 3:00
- Label: RTSH
- Composer: Edmond Zhulali
- Lyricist: Agim Doçi

Anjeza Shahini singles chronology
"The Image of You" (2004)	"Mes nesh" (2005)

Eurovision Song Contest 2004 entry
- Country: Albania
- Artist: Anjeza Shahini
- Language: English
- Composer: Edmond Zhulali
- Lyricist: Agim Doçi

Finals performance
- Semi-final result: 4th
- Semi-final points: 167
- Final result: 7th
- Final points: 106

Entry chronology
- "Tomorrow I Go" (2005) ►

"The Image of You" is a song by Albanian singer Anjeza Shahini. The song was composed by Edmond Zhulali and written by Agim Doçi. Radio Televizioni Shqiptar (RTSH) released it as a CD single in 2004. A rhythmic English-language electropop ballad, the song lyrically explores a woman's emotions in what appears to be a whirlwind romance. "The Image of You" represented Albania in the Eurovision Song Contest 2004 in Istanbul, Turkey, after Shahini won the national selection competition, Festivali i Këngës 42, with the song's Albanian-language version "Dua të jem imazhi yt". The country attempted its debut in the contest and reached the 7th place in a field of 24, receiving a total of 106 points. During her minimalistic show of the song, Shahini was accompanied on stage by four backing vocalists.

== Background and composition ==
In late 2003, Anjeza Shahini was announced as one of the contestants selected to compete in the 42nd edition of Festivali i Këngës, a competition to determine Albania's entrant for the Eurovision Song Contest 2004. Following the competition's rules, the lyrics of the participating entries had to be in the Albanian language. Shahini took part with the song "Dua të jem imazhi yt", composed by Edmond Zhulali and written by Agim Doçi. For the purpose of the singer's Eurovision Song Contest participation, "Dua të jem imazhi yt" was remastered and translated to "The Image of You". Musically, the latter is a moderately-paced rhythm English-language electropop ballad. It lyrically explores the singer's emotions in what seems to be a whirlwind romance.

== At Eurovision ==
=== Festivali i Këngës ===
The national broadcaster of Albania, Radio Televizioni Shqiptar (RTSH), organised the 42nd edition of Festivali i Këngës to determine Albania's representative for the Eurovision Song Contest 2004. The competition consisted of two semi-finals on 18 and 19 December, respectively, and the grand final on 20 December 2003. Anjeza Shahini emerged as the winner with "Imazhi yt" and was simultaneously announced as the country's representative for the Eurovision Song Contest 2004.

=== Istanbul ===
The 49th edition of the Eurovision Song Contest took place in Istanbul, Turkey, and consisted of a semi-final on 12 May and the grand final three days later on 15 May 2004. For the first time, a semi-final round was introduced to accommodate the influx of nations that wanted to compete in the contest. According to the Eurovision rules, all participating countries, except the host nation and the "Big Four", consisting of France, Germany, Spain and the United Kingdom, were required to qualify from the semi-final to compete for the final, although the top 10 countries from the semi-final progress to the final.

A debuting country, Albania was set to compete in the semi-final of the Eurovision Song Contest 2004 at position 13, following Lithuania and preceding Cyprus. At the end of the show, the nation was announced among the top 10 entries of the semi-final and therefore qualified to compete in the grand final of the contest. In the grand final, it was announced that it would be performing ninth, following Germany and preceding Ukraine. Albania finished in seventh position, being awarded a total of 106 points. The latter result remained the highest placement for Albania in the contest before their successful participation in 2012 in Baku, Azerbaijan. During her minimalistic performance of the song, Shahini was accompanied on stage by four backing vocalists.

== Track listings ==
- CD
1. "The Image of You" – 3:00
- Digital download
1. "Dua të jem imazhi yt (Festivali i Këngës)" – 4:25

== Release history ==
Release dates and formats for "The Image of You"
Region	Date	Format	Label	Ref.
Various	2004	CD	RTSH	
Various	14 February 2018	Digital download	Broken AL; RTSH	
