= Lindita (singer) =

Lindita Halimi
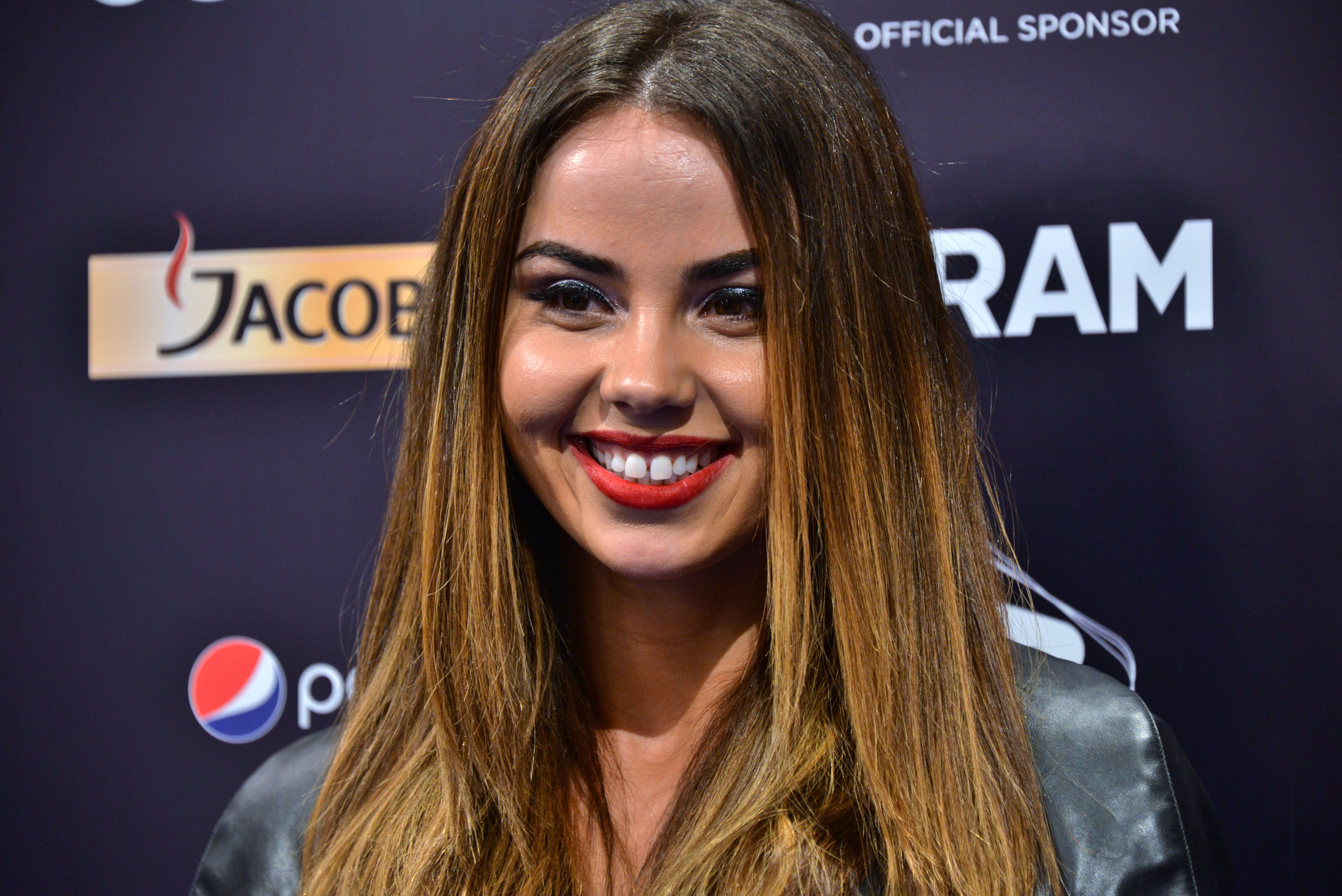
- Lindita in 2017

Background information
- Also known as: LINDITA; Linda Halimi
- Born: Linda Halimi; 24 March 1989 (age 37); Novosella, Viti, SFR Yugoslavia (present-day Kosovo)
- Genres: Opera
- Occupations: Singer; songwriter
- Instruments: Vocals, piano
- Years active: 2006–present
- Label: Independent

Lindita Halimi (born 24 March 1989), commonly known as simply LINDITA, is a Kosovo Albanian singer and songwriter who sings in both Albanian and English. She rose to fame after winning the sixth edition of Top Fest with "Ëndërroja".

In 2016, she participated in the fifteenth season of American Idol. In 2017, she represented Albania in the Eurovision Song Contest with the song "World", after winning Festivali i Këngës 55. Recognized for her powerful and versatile vocal delivery ranges from screaming to opera singing, Lindita has had collaborations with Stevie Wonder in 2013 and Valerie Simpson. She has also opened for the Backstreet Boys.

== Early years and career ==
Lindita Halimi was born in Viti, Kosovo (then part of SFR Yugoslavia), on 24 March 1989. She took part in the third edition of Ethet (Albanian Idol) and reached the Top 10. She later took part in Top Fest on three occasions and won the competition in 2009 with the song "Ëndërroja", gaining wider recognition in Albania and Kosovo.

Halimi is known for her whistle register and powerful vocal range, and has released several singles throughout her career. In 2013, she moved to the United States. In December 2014, she returned to Albania to compete in the 53rd edition of Festivali i Këngës, finishing third with the song "S'të Fal". She subsequently won Festivali i Këngës 55 with the song "Botë", earning the right to represent Albania in the Eurovision Song Contest 2017 with the English version of the song, "World".

In 2021, Lindita competed in the 22nd edition of Kënga Magjike with the song “Pa t’pa”. She reached the final and ultimately placed 7th among 42 contestants.

In 2023, Halimi released her debut extended play, Ain’t Ya Average, consisting of five tracks, accompanied by music videos for the singles “Ain’t Ya Average” and “Battlefield of Love”. In the same year, she participated in the second season of Big Brother VIP Kosova, remaining in the house for 85 days. She currently works as an independent singer and songwriter and continues to release new music, including recent singles such as “Je Je Je” and “How Far…?”.

== Discography ==
Singles
Title	Year	Album
"Vetëm sytë e tu" (featuring Ngroba)	2007	Non-album singles
"Dallëndyshe" (featuring Ngroba)	2008	Non-album singles
"Ëndërroja"	2009	Non-album singles
"Të dua vërtet"	2009	Non-album singles
"Nuk të dorëzohëm" (featuring Erti Hizmo)	2009	Non-album singles
"Më e forte se kurrë"	2010	Non-album singles
"Supa Dupa Fly" (featuring Big D)	2010	Non-album singles
"All Mine" (featuring Nora Istrefi and Big D)	2010	Non-album singles
"Kohën do ta ndal"	2011	Non-album singles
"I Just Wanna"	2012	Non-album singles
"Ndihmë"	2012	Non-album singles
"Closer"	2013	Non-album singles
"Kur një ditë të kthehësh ti"	2013	Non-album singles
"S'të fal"	2014	Non-album singles
"Cold World"	2015	Non-album singles
"Come Thru"	2016	Non-album singles
"Botë"	2016	Non-album singles
"Now"	2017	Non-album singles
"World"	2017	Non-album singles
"Rock Whine"	2017	Non-album singles
"Murda"	2018	Non-album singles
"Holiday"	2018	Non-album singles
"I Betcha"	2019	Non-album singles
"Want My Love"	2019	Non-album singles
"Gur"	2020	Non-album singles
"Better You"	2020	Non-album singles
"In The Air"	2020	Non-album singles
"All The Way"	2020	Non-album singles
"Pa t’pa"	2021	Non-album singles
"Amin"	2021	Non-album singles
"#GMFU"	2022	Non-album singles
"Love Me Like"	2022	Non-album singles
"Jealous"	2022	Non-album singles
"Ain’t Ya Average"	2023	Ain’t Ya Average
"All I Want"	2023	Ain’t Ya Average
"Battlefield of Love"	2023	Ain’t Ya Average
"How Deep is Your Love?"	2023	Ain’t Ya Average
"Am’don Hala"	2023	Ain’t Ya Average
"Sikur Ta Dije"	2024	Non-album singles
"Hands Up"	2024	Non-album singles
"Que Eso Sasha Wrist"	2024	Non-album singles
"Ku Je"	2024	Non-album singles
"I Can't Sleep"	2024	Non-album singles
"Ama Ti Ama"	2024	Non-album singles
"Secrets"	2024	Non-album singles
"Celebration"	2025	Non-album singles
"Ironic"	2025	Non-album singles
"Baby All I Want"	2025	Non-album singles
"Tell Me That You Love Me"	2025	Non-album singles
"Je Je Je"	2025	Non-album singles
"NYJE"	2025	Non-album singles
"E Vrave Dashurine"	2025	Non-album singles
"No Thank You"	2025	Non-album singles
"Dream in My Head"	2025	Non-album singles
"Oh Christmas"	2025	Non-album singles
"Feelin U"	2025	Non-album singles
"For Me"	2025	Non-album singles
"How Far...?"	2025	Non-album singles
"U love me"	2026	Non-album singles
"Green Light"	2026	Non-album singles
"Cka na mbet nga dashuria"	2026	Non-album singles
"No"	2026	Non-album singles
"Ajo"	2026	Non-album singles
"HEAVY"	2026	Non-album singles
"Run"	2026	Non-album singles
"Vai"	2026	Non-album singles
"Rrejëm"	2026	Non-album singles
"Pse"	2026	Non-album singles
"Me ty"	2026	Non-album singles
"Kaj"	2026	Non-album singles
"8 Bilion"	2026	Non-album singles
"Inat"	2026	Non-album singles
"So Unë"	2026	Non-album singles
"Helm"	2026	Non-album singles

== Awards and nominations ==
Year	Event	Category	Work	Result
2007	Top Fest 2007	Best New Artist	"Vetem syte e tu (ft Ngroba)"	Won
2008	Top Fest 2008	Vodafone Club Award	"Dallendyshe (ft Ngroba)"	Won
2009	Top Fest 2009	Main Competition	"Enderroja"	Won
2009	Kënga Magjike 2009	Best Rock Song	"Të dua vërtet"	Won
2009	Festivali i Këngës 48	Main Competition	"Nuk të dorezohem"	Nominated
2010	Nota Fest 2010	Best Performers	"Supa Dupa Fly" (feat. Big D)	Won
2010	Nota Fest 2010	Main Competition	"Supa Dupa Fly" (feat. Big D)	Second
2010	Top Fest 2010	Main Competition	"Më e Fortë Se Kurrë"	Nominated
2011	Zhurma Show Awards 2011	Best Dance Song	"Kohen do ta ndal"	Nominated
2012	Netët E Klipit Shqiptar 11	Main Competition	"Ndihmë"	Nominated
2014	Festivali i Këngës 53	Main Competition	"S'të fal"	Third
2016	Festivali i Këngës 55	Main Competition	"Botë"	Won
2021	Kënga Magjike 2021	Main Competition	"Pa T’pa"	Seventh

Awards and achievements
Preceded by Eneda Tarifa with "Përallë"	Festivali i Këngës; Winner; 2016	Succeeded by Eugent Bushpepa with "Mall"
Preceded by Eneda Tarifa with "Fairytale"	Albania in the Eurovision Song Contest; 2017	Succeeded by Eugent Bushpepa with "Mall"
