= Albania in the Eurovision Song Contest 2016 =

- Eurovision Song Contest 2016
- Participating broadcaster: Radio Televizioni Shqiptar (RTSH)
- Country: Albania
- Selection process: Festivali i Këngës 54
- Selection date: 27 December 2015

Competing entry
- Song: "Fairytale"
- Artist: Eneda Tarifa
- Songwriters: Olsa Toqi

Placement
- Semi-final result: Failed to qualify (16th)

Participation chronology

Albania was represented at the Eurovision Song Contest 2016 in Stockholm, Sweden, with the song "Fairytale" performed by Eneda Tarifa. The nation's entry was selected in December 2015 through the national selection competition Festivali i Këngës organised by Radio Televizioni Shqiptar (RTSH). Initially titled "Përrallë", the song was remastered and translated into English for its Eurovision participation.

By 2016, Albania had participated in the Eurovision Song Contest 12 times since its first entry in 2004. Prior to the 2016 contest, the song was promoted by a music video and several live performances across Europe. Albania was drawn to compete in the second semi-final of the Eurovision Song Contest, which took place on 12 May 2016. Performing 17th (second to last), the nation was not among the top 10 entries of its semi-final and therefore failed to qualify for the final, marking Albania's sixth non-qualification in the contest. When the results were released shortly after, Albania had placed 16th with 45 points.

== Background ==
Prior to the 2016 contest, Albania had participated in the Eurovision Song Contest 12 times since its first entry in 2004. Its first entry was the song "The Image of You" performed by Anjeza Shahini, which finished in seventh place, the nation's second-highest placing as of 2023. The country's highest placing by 2016 had been fifth, which it achieved in 2012 with the song "Suus" performed by Rona Nishliu. Albania had previously failed to qualify for the final four times, most recently in 2014. The Albanian broadcaster that broadcast the 2016 contest in Albania and organised the selection process for its entry was Radio Televizioni Shqiptar (RTSH). The Albanian song contest Festivali i Këngës has been organised annually since 1964 and has been used as the country's entry selection method since its debut in 2004.

== Before Eurovision ==
=== Festivali i Këngës ===
The national broadcaster of Albania, RTSH, organised the 54th edition of Festivali i Këngës with the objective of determining the country's entry for the Eurovision Song Contest 2016. The competition consisted of two semi-finals on 25 and 26 December, respectively, and the final on 27 December 2015. The three live shows were held at the Palace of Congresses in Tirana and hosted by Blerta Tafani and Pandi Laço. The contest featured Laço as the screenwriter and Elton Deda as the artistic director.

==== Competing entries ====
RTSH invited interested artists and composers to submit their entries between 29 and 30 September 2015. All songs were required to be in the Albanian language, all performers were required to be at least 16 years of age, and singers and composers could only submit one song while lyricists could only submit two songs. On 16 October 2015, RTSH announced the 30 artists and songs selected for the competition by a special committee and among the competing artists were two previous Albanian Eurovision Song Contest entrants: Luiz Ejlli (2006) and Adrian Lulgjuraj (2013). One substitution was made prior to the event: "Era" performed by Edea Demaliaj was replaced by "Një shishe në oqean" performed by Orgesa Zaimi.

The competing entries were released to the public online through the broadcaster's website on 4 December 2015. Throughout December 2015, Radio Tirana aired the competing entries and interviewed the artists on the programme Gjithçka Shqip hosted by Andri Xhahu and Artemisa Deda. On 10 December, 40-second promotional video clip montages of all of the entries were released by the broadcaster.

Key: Withdrawn Replacement entry

Competing entries
Artist	Song	Songwriter(s)
Adrian Lulgjuraj	"Jeto dhe ëndërro"	Adrian Lulgjuraj
Andi Tanko	"Dielli vazhdon të më ngrohë"	Edmond Mancaku
Aslajdon Zaimaj	"Merrmë që sot"	Briz Musaraj; Gerald Xhari
Besa Krasniqi	"Liroje zemrën"	Besa Krasniqi
Dilan Reka	"Buzëqesh"	Ergisa Cenuka; Endri Sina
Edea Demaliaj (Note: "Era" by Edea Demaliaj was replaced by "Një shishe në oqean" by Orgesa Zaimi.)	"Era"	Adrian Hila; Pandi Laço
Egert Pano	"Mos ik"	Egert Pano; Enrieta Sina
Egzon Pireci	"Triumf"	Faton Dolaku; Egzon Pireci
Eneda Tarifa	"Përrallë"	Olsa Toqi
Enxhi Nasufi	"Infinit"	Klodian Qafoku; Florian Zyka
Erga Halilaj	"Monolog"	Erga Halilaj; Gjergj Kaçinari
Evans Rama	"Flakë"	Helena Halilaj; Gent Lako
Flaka Krelani	"S'je për mua"	Qëndrim Krelani
Florent Abrashi	"Të ndjek çdo hap"	Fabian Asllani
Genc Tukiçi	"Sa të dashuroj"	Genc Tukiçi
Jozefina Simoni	"Një det me ty"	Sokol Marsi; Enis Mullaj
Klajdi Musabelliu	"Ndodh edhe kështu"	Klajdi Musabelli; Perikli Papingji
Klodian Kaçani and Rezarta Smaja	"Dashuri në përjetësi"	Agim Doçi; Edmond Zhulali
Kozma Dushi	"Një kafe"	Vladimir Kotani; Jorgo Papingji
Kristi Popa	"Ajo çfarë ndjej"	Jorgo Papingji; Kristi Popa
Lindi Islami	"Për një mrekulli"	Lindi Islami; Gerald Xhari
Luiz Ejlli	"Pa mbarim"	Marian Deda; Agim Doçi
Niku and Entela Zhula	"Muza"	Entela Zhula
Nilsa Hysi	"Asaj"	Nilsa Hysi; Indri Topi
Orgesa Zaimi	"Një shishe në oqean"	Agron Tufa; Diana Ziu
Renis Gjoka	"Ato që s'ti them dot"	Renis Gjoka
Revolt Klan	"Dashurinë s'e gjejmë dot"	Revolt Klan
Sigi Bastri	"Engjëll i lirë"	Silivi Bastri; Endrit Shani
Simbol	"Artiste"	Martin Çipi; Simbol
Teuta Kurti	"Në sytë e mi"	Sokol Marsi
Voltan Prodani	"Dëgjoje këngën o Atë"	Zhuljana Jorganxhi; Voltan Prodani

==== Semi-finals ====
The two semi-finals of Festivali i Këngës took place on 25 December and 26 December 2015 and were broadcast at 20:45 (CET). In each semi-final, a total of 15 songs competed of which 11 entries in each semi-final, selected by a jury, advanced to the final.

Key: Qualifier

Semi-final 1 – 25 December 2015
R/O	Artist	Song
1	Egzon Pireci	"Triumf"
2	Simbol	"Artiste"
3	Voltan Prodani	"Dëgjoje këngën o Atë"
4	Adrian Lulgjuraj	"Jeto dhe ëndërro"
5	Sigi Bastri	"Engjëll i lirë"
6	Dilan Reka	"Buzëqesh"
7	Luiz Ejlli	"Pa mbarim"
8	Nilsa Hysi	"Asaj"
9	Orgesa Zaimi	"Një shishe në oqean"
10	Erga Halilaj	"Monolog"
11	Florent Abrashi	"Të ndjek çdo hap"
12	Teuta Kurti	"Në sytë e mi"
13	Kozma Dushi	"Një kafe"
14	Aslajdon Zaimaj	"Merrmë që sot"
15	Egert Pano	"Mos ik"

Semi-final 2 – 26 December 2015
R/O	Artist	Song
1	Kristi Popa	"Ajo çfarë ndjej"
2	Klodian Kaçani and Rezarta Smaja	"Dashuri në përjetësi"
3	Revolt Klan	"Dashurinë s'e gjejmë dot"
4	Jozefina Simoni	"Një det me ty"
5	Andi Tanko	"Dielli vazhdon të më ngrohë"
6	Niku and Entela Zhula	"Muza"
7	Genc Tukiçi	"Sa të dashuroj"
8	Evans Rama	"Flakë"
9	Besa Krasniqi	"Liroje zemrën"
10	Enxhi Nasufi	"Infinit"
11	Flaka Krelani	"S'je për mua"
12	Renis Gjoka	"Ato që s'ti them dot"
13	Lindi Islami	"Për një mrekulli"
14	Eneda Tarifa	"Përrallë"
15	Klajdi Musabelliu	"Ndodh edhe kështu"

==== Final ====
The final of Festivali i Këngës took place on 27 December 2015 and was broadcast at 20:45 (CET). A jury determined Eneda Tarifa as the winner of the contest with the song "Përrallë".

Key: Winner Second place Third place

Final – 27 December 2015
R/O	Artist(s)	Song	Place
1	Sigi Bastri	"Engjëll i lirë"	
2	Klodian Kaçani and Rezarta Smaja	"Dashuri në përjetësi"	4
3	Dilan Reka	"Buzëqesh"	7
4	Adrian Lulgjuraj	"Jeto dhe ëndërro"	
5	Erga Halilaj	"Monolog"	
6	Evans Rama	"Flakë"	10
7	Jozefina Simoni	"Një det me ty"	
8	Egert Pano	"Mos ik"	
9	Genc Tukiçi	"Sa të dashuroj"	
10	Kozma Dushi	"Një kafe"	
11	Luiz Ejlli	"Pa mbarim"	
12	Teuta Kurti	"Në sytë e mi"	8
13	Besa Krasniqi	"Liroje zemrën"	
14	Nilsa Hysi	"Asaj"	6
15	Kristi Popa	"Ajo çfarë ndjej"	
16	Flaka Krelani	"S'je për mua"	3
17	Enxhi Nasufi	"Infinit"	5
18	Lindi Islami	"Për një mrekulli"	
19	Florent Abrashi	"Të ndjek çdo hap"	
20	Eneda Tarifa	"Përrallë"	1
21	Renis Gjoka	"Ato që s'ti them dot"	9
22	Aslajdon Zaimaj	"Merrmë që sot"	2

=== Preparation and promotion ===
For the purposes of participating in Eurovision, a remastered and English-language version of "Përrallë" titled "Fairytale" was released on 13 March 2016. Its release was accompanied by a music video uploaded to the official YouTube channel of the Eurovision Song Contest. For further promotion, Tarifa embarked on a small tour with live performances at various Eurovision Song Contest-related events in Amsterdam, London, and Tel Aviv. This included participation in the eighth annual Eurovision in Concert series, an event held at the club Melkweg in Amsterdam, Netherlands, that was staged to serve as a preview party for the year's entries.

== At Eurovision ==
The Eurovision Song Contest 2016 took place at Ericsson Globe in Stockholm, Sweden; it consisted of two semi-finals held on 10 and 12 May, respectively, and the finalon 14 May 2016. According to the rules, all participating countries, apart from the host nation and the "Big 5", consisting of France, Germany, Italy, Spain and the United Kingdom, were required to qualify from one of the two semi-finals to compete for the final, with the top 10 countries from each semi-final progressing to the final of the contest. On 26 January 2016, an allocation draw was held at the Stockholm City Hall that placed each country into one of the two semi-finals and determined which half of the show they would perform in. Albania was placed into the second semi-final, to be held on 12 May, and was scheduled to perform in the second half of the show.

Once all the competing songs for the 2016 contest had been released, the running order for the semi-finals was decided by the producers of the contest rather than through another draw, for preventing similar songs being placed next to each other; Albania was set to perform at position 18, following Georgia and preceding Belgium. However, the nation's performing position shifted to 17, following Romania's disqualification from the contest on 22 April and subsequent removal from the running order of the second semi-final.

=== Performances ===
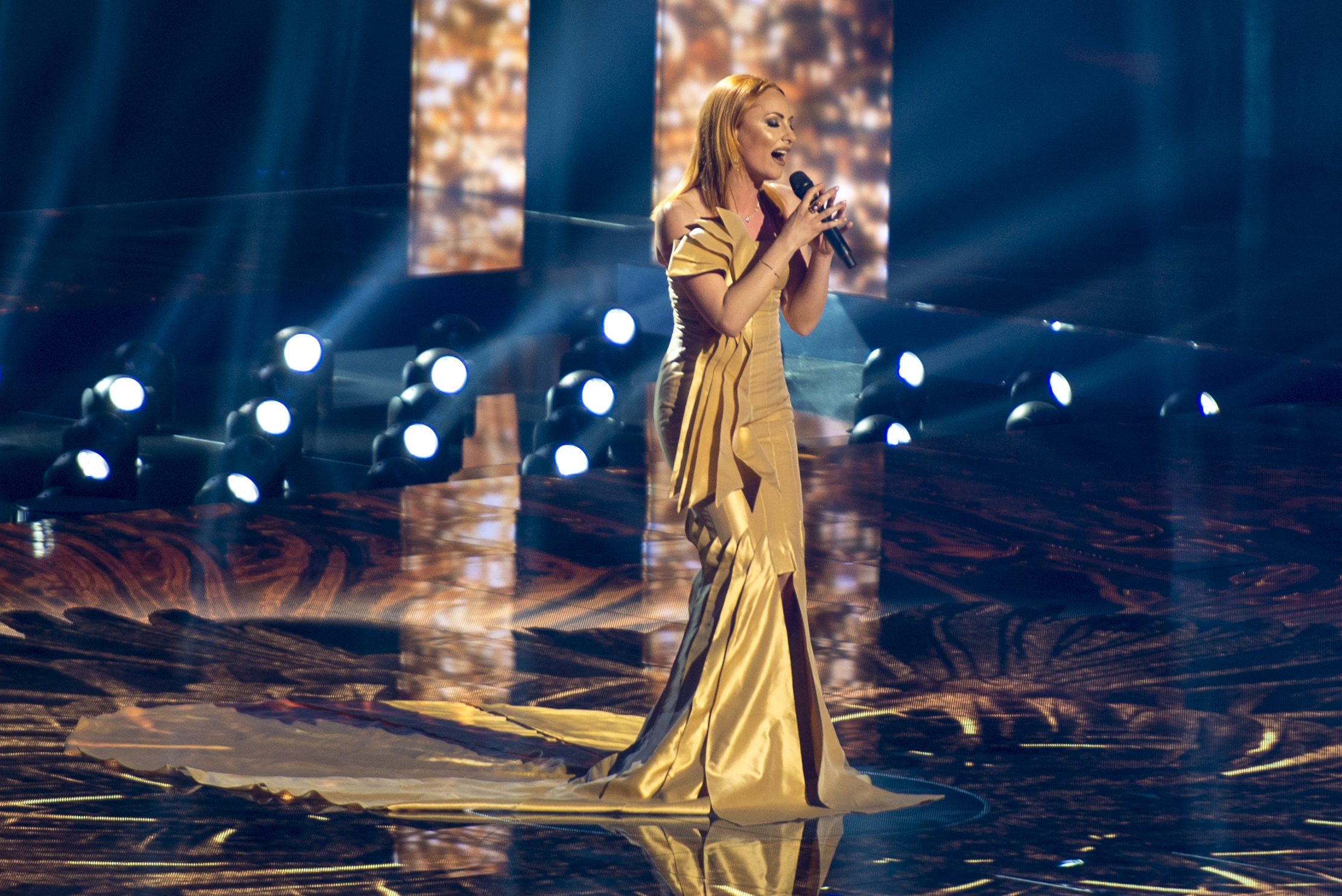
Eneda Tarifa performing during a rehearsal prior the second semi-final of the Eurovision Song Contest 2016.

Tarifa took part in technical rehearsals on 5 and 7 May, followed by dress rehearsals on 11 and 12 May. This included the jury show on 11 May where the professional juries of each country watched and voted on the competing entries. The performance saw Tarifa dressed in a long gold dress standing atop a gold LED stage floor. When viewed together, the dress appeared to extend into the floor as one continuous piece covering the stage. Surrounding Tarifa were accents and pyrotechnics also of gold color. She was joined on stage by three backing vocalists: Besa Krasniqi, Venera Lumani and Xhoni Jesku.

At the end of the second semi-final, the country was not announced among the top 10 entries in the semi-final and therefore failed to qualify for the final, marking the sixth time Albania had failed to qualify in the contest. It was later revealed that Albania placed 16th in the semi-final, receiving a total of 45 points: 35 points from the televoting and 10 points from the juries.

=== Voting ===
Voting during the three live shows of the Eurovision Song Contest was conducted under a new system that involved each country now awarding two sets of points from 1–8, 10 and 12: one from their professional jury and the other from televoting. Each nation's jury consisted of five music industry professionals who were citizens of the country they represented, with their names published before the contest to ensure transparency. This jury judged each entry based on vocal capacity, the stage performance, the song's composition and originality and the overall impression by the act. In addition, no member of a national jury was permitted to be related in any way to any of the competing acts in such a way that they could not vote impartially and independently. The individual rankings of each jury member as well as the nation's televoting results were released shortly after the final.

Below is a breakdown of points awarded to Albania and awarded by Albania in the second semi-final and final of the contest, and the breakdown of the jury voting and televoting conducted during the two shows:

==== Points awarded to Albania ====
Points awarded to Albania (Semi-final 2)
Score	Televote	Jury
12 points	Macedonia	
10 points	Switzerland	
8 points	Italy	Serbia
7 points		
6 points		
5 points		
4 points		
3 points	Slovenia	
2 points	Belgium	Bulgaria
1 point		

==== Points awarded by Albania ====
Points awarded by Albania (Semi-final 2)
Score	Televote	Jury
12 points	Macedonia	Macedonia
10 points	Norway	Australia
8 points	Belgium	Serbia
7 points	Bulgaria	Bulgaria
6 points	Australia	Slovenia
5 points	Ukraine	Ukraine
4 points	Lithuania	Israel
3 points	Switzerland	Denmark
2 points	Denmark	Poland
1 point	Slovenia	Latvia

Points awarded by Albania (Final)
Score	Televote	Jury
12 points	Australia	Australia
10 points	Italy	France
8 points	Bulgaria	Italy
7 points	Russia	Russia
6 points	Ukraine	Spain
5 points	Poland	United Kingdom
4 points	Lithuania	Bulgaria
3 points	Sweden	Israel
2 points	Armenia	Malta
1 point	Hungary	Hungary

==== Detailed voting results ====
The following members comprised the Albanian jury:

- Edison Misso (jury chairperson)
- Kejsi Tola
- Flamur Shehu
- Nisida Tufa
- Agim Doçi

Detailed voting results from Albania (Semi-final 2)
R/O	Country	Jury							Televote	
R/O	Country	E. Misso	K. Tola	F. Shehu	N. Tufa	A. Doçi	Rank	Points	Rank	Points
01	Latvia	9	10	9	10	10	10	1	12	
02	Poland	7	8	10	9	9	9	2	15	
03	Switzerland	14	11	12	12	11	11		8	3
04	Israel	8	5	6	7	7	7	4	11	
05	Belarus	15	16	11	13	17	14		16	
06	Serbia	1	4	2	3	4	3	8	14	
07	Ireland	11	17	16	14	15	15		13	
08	Macedonia	2	2	3	1	2	1	12	1	12
09	Lithuania	17	12	17	15	12	16		7	4
10	Australia	3	1	1	2	3	2	10	5	6
11	Slovenia	4	7	4	6	5	5	6	10	1
12	Bulgaria	5	3	5	4	1	4	7	4	7
13	Denmark	10	9	8	8	6	8	3	9	2
14	Ukraine	6	6	7	5	8	6	5	6	5
15	Norway	13	15	13	11	14	12		2	10
16	Georgia	12	14	15	16	13	13		17	
17	Albania									
18	Belgium	16	13	14	17	16	17		3	8

Detailed voting results from Albania (Final)
R/O	Country	Jury							Televote	
R/O	Country	E. Misso	K. Tola	F. Shehu	N. Tufa	A. Doçi	Rank	Points	Rank	Points
01	Belgium	20	22	24	24	16	25		14	
02	Czech Republic	21	23	25	16	15	22		22	
03	Netherlands	22	24	23	21	14	24		24	
04	Azerbaijan	19	21	11	11	12	13		19	
05	Hungary	8	14	9	9	13	10	1	10	1
06	Italy	4	7	3	2	10	3	8	2	10
07	Israel	10	4	18	12	2	8	3	17	
08	Bulgaria	11	13	6	6	3	7	4	3	8
09	Sweden	16	6	15	15	8	11		8	3
10	Germany	18	11	20	17	17	18		15	
11	France	3	9	1	1	9	2	10	11	
12	Poland	14	20	13	22	7	14		6	5
13	Australia	1	1	2	3	1	1	12	1	12
14	Cyprus	25	25	21	20	11	23		12	
15	Serbia	15	15	12	19	26	19		26	
16	Lithuania	13	17	22	23	18	20		7	4
17	Croatia	24	18	16	18	19	21		20	
18	Russia	7	5	7	7	4	4	7	4	7
19	Spain	9	12	4	4	5	5	6	23	
20	Latvia	23	8	17	13	20	17		21	
21	Ukraine	17	2	8	8	25	12		5	6
22	Malta	5	16	5	5	21	9	2	16	
23	Georgia	26	26	26	26	22	26		25	
24	Austria	6	19	19	14	23	16		13	
25	United Kingdom	2	10	10	10	6	6	5	18	
26	Armenia	12	3	14	25	24	15		9	2
