= Albania in the Eurovision Song Contest 2017 =

- Eurovision Song Contest 2017
- Participating broadcaster: Radio Televizioni Shqiptar (RTSH)
- Country: Albania
- Selection process: Festivali i Këngës 55
- Selection date: 23 December 2016

Competing entry
- Song: "World"
- Artist: Lindita Halimi
- Songwriters: Gerald Xhari; Klodian Qafoku

Placement
- Semi-final result: Failed to qualify (14th)

Participation chronology

Albania was represented at the Eurovision Song Contest 2017 in Kyiv, Ukraine, with the song "World" performed by Lindita Halimi. Its selected entry was chosen through the national selection competition Festivali i Këngës organised by Radio Televizioni Shqiptar (RTSH) in December 2016. To this point, the nation had participated in the Eurovision Song Contest 13 times since its first entry in 2004. Prior to the contest, the song was promoted by a music video and live performances in Israel, the Netherlands and Spain. Albania was drawn to compete in the first semi-final of the Eurovision Song Contest, which took place on 9 May 2017. Performing as number fourth, the nation was not announced among the top 10 entries of the first semi-final and therefore failed to qualify for the grand final, marking Albania's seventh non-qualification in the contest.

== Background ==
Prior to the 2017 contest, Albania had participated in the Eurovision Song Contest 13 times since its first entry in 2004. The country's highest placing in the contest, to this point, had been the fifth place, which it achieved in 2012 with the song "Suus" performed by Rona Nishliu. The first entry was performed by Anjeza Shahini with the song "The Image of You" and finished in the seventh place, the nation's second-highest placing to date. During its tenure in the contest, Albania failed to qualify for the grand final six times, with the 2016 entry being the most recent non-qualifier. The country's national broadcaster, Radio Televizioni Shqiptar (RTSH), organises Festivali i Këngës in order to select the nation's entry for the Eurovision Song Contest. In September 2019, the broadcaster confirmed Albania's participation in the 2017 contest in Kyiv, Ukraine.

== Before Eurovision ==
=== Festivali i Këngës ===
The national broadcaster of Albania, Radio Televizioni Shqiptar (RTSH), organised the 55th edition of Festivali i Këngës to determine their participant for the Eurovision Song Contest 2017. The competition consisted of two semi-finals on 21 and 22 December, respectively, and the grand final on 23 December 2016. The three live shows were hosted by Albanian singer Ledina Çelo and actor Kasem Hoxha. On 13 November, RTSH published a provisory list of 24 artists and songs shortlisted to compete in the two semi-finals of Festivali i Këngës. On 19 December 2016, it published the allocation draw of the participating contestants for each semi-final.

==== Competing entries ====
Key: Withdrawn

Competing entries
Artist(s)	Song	Songwriter(s)
Albulena Jashari	"Fjalët ia lë zemrës"	Briz Musaraj; Marsela Çibukaj; Gerald Xhari
Classic Boys	"Dashuria për jetën"	Endri Sina; Saimir Braho
Dilan Reka	"Mos harro"	Edmond Zhulali; Agim Doçi
Edea Demaliaj	"Besoj në ëndrra"	Fabian Asllani; Edea Demaliaj
Edona Vatoci (Note: In early December 2016, Radio Televizioni Shqiptar (RTSH) announced that Edona Vatoci would withdraw from the competition due to violation of the application rules.)	"Mirëmëngjës"	Edona Vatoci
Elson Braha	"Edhe një herë"	Adrian Hila; Pandi Laço
Erlind Zeraliu	"Dhimbja e gëzimit"	Vasil Tole; Fatos Arapi
Agnesa Çavolli and Fabiola Agalliu	"Shkon e vjen"	Sokol Marsi; Fabiola Agalliu
Festina Mejzini	"Atje lart"	Eriona Rushiti
Flaka Krelani	"Osiris"	Qëndrim Krelani
Franc Koruni	"Macka"	Franc Koruni
Genc Salihu	"Këtu"	Genc Salihu
Lindita Halimi	"Botë"	Klodian Qafoku; Gerald Xhari
Linda Rukaj	"Vija e lumit"	Linda Rukaj
Lorela	"Me ty"	Alban Kondi; Turjan Hyska
Lynx	"Sot"	Lynx
Luka Hajdani and Serxhio Hajdini	"Koha plaket"	Serxhio Hajdini; Luka Hajdini
Neki Emra	"Dashuri dhe urrejtje"	Neki Emra; Albatros Rexha
Orges Toçe	"Shi diamantësh"	Orges Toçe
Rezarta Smaja	"Pse prite gjatë"	Xhevdet Gashi; Arsim Bujaku
Tiri	"Më zgjo"	Enis Mullaj; Sokol Marsi
Xhejni Lito	"Pritja"	Indrit Lelo
Xhesika Polo	"Eva jam unë"	Marko Polo; Alex Seitaj
Xuxi	"Metropol"	Genti Lako; Ana Gramo
Yll Limani	"Shiu"	Ilirjana Blakaj; Yll Limani

==== Shows ====
===== Semi-finals =====
The semi-finals of Festivali i Këngës took place on 21 December and 22 December 2016, and were broadcast at 20:30 and 21:00 (CET) on the respective dates. 12 contestants participated in each semi-final, with the highlighted ones progressing to the grand final.

Semi-final 1 – 21 December 2016
R/O	Artist	Song
1	Flaka Krelani	"Osiris"
2	Xhejni Lito	"Pritja"
3	Genc Salihu	"Këtu"
4	Erlind Zeraliu	"Dhimbja e gëzimit"
5	Xhesika Polo	"Eva jam unë"
6	Festina Mejzini	"Atje lart"
7	Edea Demaliaj	"Besoj në ëndrra"
8	Neki Emra	"Dashuri dhe urrejtje"
9	Yll Limani	"Shiu"
10	Franc Koruni	"Macka"
11	Orges Toçe	"Shi diamantësh"
12	Lynx	"Sot"

Semi-final 2 – 22 December 2016
R/O	Artist	Song
1	Elson Braha	"Edhe një herë"
2	Lorela	"Me ty"
3	Tiri	"Më zgjo"
4	Agnesa Çavolli and Fabiola Agalliu	"Shkon e vjen"
5	Rezarta Smaja	"Pse prite gjatë"
6	Dilan Reka	"Mos harro"
7	Albulena Jashari	"Fjalët ia lë zemrës"
8	Xuxi	"Metropol"
9	Luka Hajdini and Serxhio Hajdini	"Koha plaket"
10	Classic Boys	"Dashuria për jetën"
11	Linda Rukaj	"Vija e lumit"
12	Lindita Halimi	"Botë"

===== Final =====
The grand final of Festivali i Këngës took place on 23 December 2016 and was broadcast at 20:30 (CET). In it, the results of the competition were determined by a combination of votes from a jury panel (12/13) and a public internet vote (1/13). Before the end of the show, Lindita Halimi emerged as the winner and was simultaneously announced as the representative of Albania for the Eurovision Song Contest 2017.

Final – 23 December 2016
R/O	Artist	Song	Votes		Total	Result
R/O	Artist	Song	Jury	Internet	Total	Result
1	Franc Koruni	"Macka"	12	0	12	11
2	Lorela	"Me ty"	8	0	8	12
3	Xhesika Polo	"Eva jam unë"	5	0	5	14
4	Xuxi	"Metropol"	30	0	30	5
5	Agnesa Çavolli and Fabiola Agalliu	"Shkon e vjen"	7	0	7	13
6	Dilan Reka	"Mos harro"	43	7	50	3
7	Lindita Halimi	"Botë"	80	5	85	1
8	Flaka Krelani	"Osiris"	27	3	30	5
9	Rezarta Smaja	"Pse prite gjatë"	20	4	24	7
10	Edea Demaliaj	"Besoj në ëndrra"	23	0	23	9
11	Yll Limani	"Shiu"	40	10	50	3
12	Lynx	"Sot"	13	1	14	10
13	Orges Toçe	"Shi diamantësh"	24	0	24	7
14	Genc Salihu	"Këtu"	52	2	54	2

=== Promotion ===
A music video for "World" was premiered on the official YouTube channel of the Eurovision Song Contest on 13 March 2017. For further promotional purposes, Halimi embarked on a small tour with live performances at various events related to the contest, including in Amsterdam, Madrid and Tel Aviv.

== At Eurovision ==
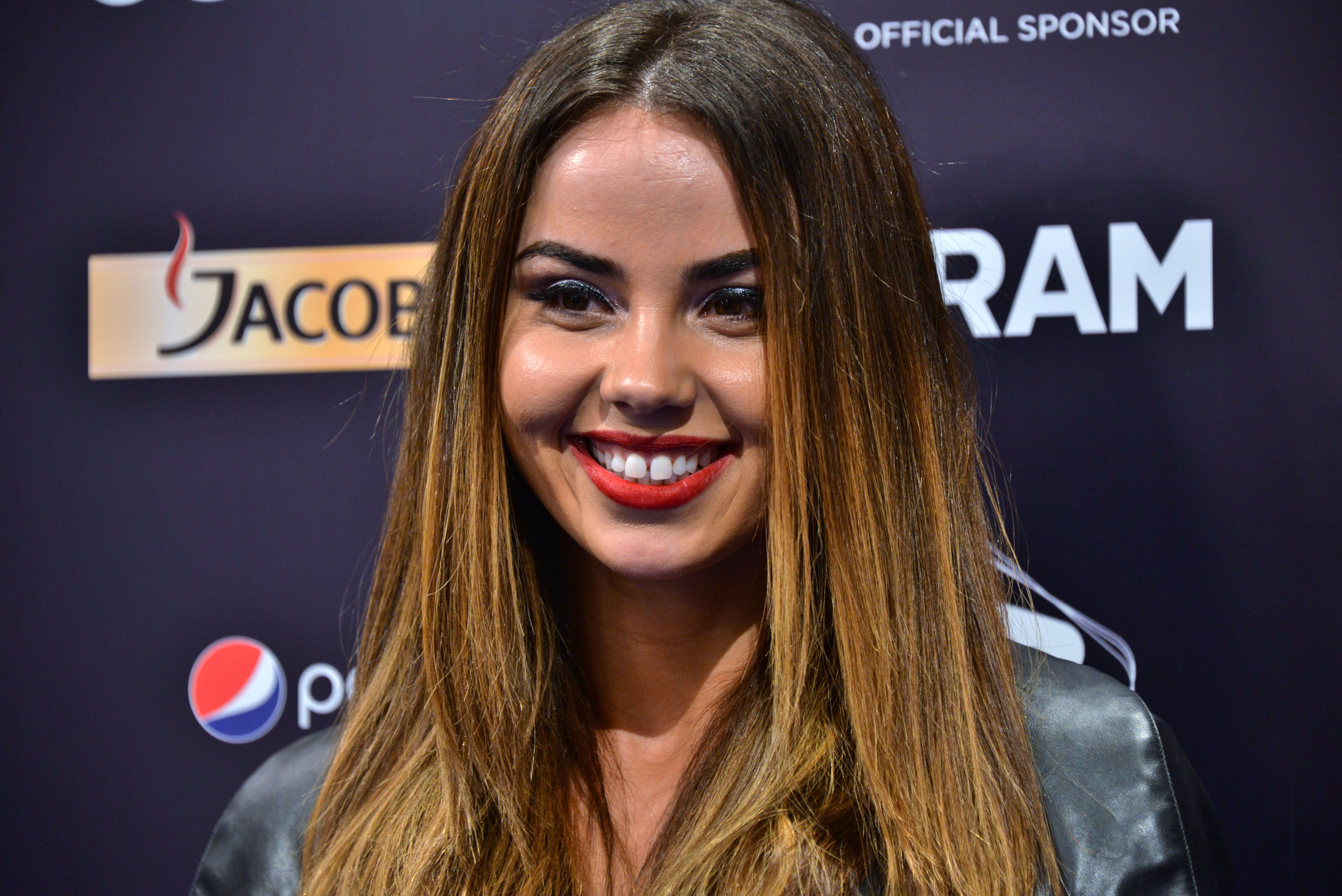
Lindita during a press meet and greet at the Eurovision Song Contest 2017.

The Eurovision Song Contest 2017 took place at the International Exhibition Centre in Kyiv, Ukraine, and consisted of two semi-finals held on 9 and 11 May, respectively, and the grand final on 13 May 2017. According to the rules, all participating countries, apart from the host nation and the "Big Five", consisting of France, Germany, Italy, Spain and the United Kingdom, were required to qualify from one of the two semi-finals to compete for the grand final, although, the top 10 countries from the respective semi-final progress to the grand final of the contest.

On 31 January 2017, a special allocation draw was held in Kyiv that placed each country into one of the two semi-finals, as well as which half of the show they would perform in. Albania was placed into the first semi-final, to be held on 9 May, and was scheduled to perform in the first half of the show. Once all the competing songs for the 2017 contest had been released, the running order for the semi-finals was decided by the producers of the contest rather than through another draw, for preventing similar songs being placed next to each other; Albania was set to perform in position four, following Australia and preceding Belgium. At the end of the first semi-final, the country was not announced among the top 10 entries in the semi-final and therefore failed to qualify for the grand final, marking Albania's seventh non-qualification in the Eurovision Song Contest.

=== Voting ===
The tables below visualise a breakdown of points awarded to Albania in the first semi-final of the Eurovision Song Contest 2017, as well as by the country for both the first semi-final and grand final. In the semi-final, Albania finished in 14th place with a total of 76 points, including 12 by the televoters from Montenegro and 10 from Moldova, and 10 points by the juries from Azerbaijan, Greece and Montenegro. In the grand final, its televoters and juries awarded their 12 points to Italy and 10 points to Bulgaria.

==== Points awarded to Albania ====
Points awarded to Albania (Semi-final 1)
Score	Televote	Jury
12 points	Montenegro	
10 points	Moldova	Azerbaijan; Greece; Montenegro
8 points		Italy
7 points	Italy	
6 points		
5 points	Greece	
4 points		
3 points	Azerbaijan	
2 points		
1 point	Slovenia	

==== Points awarded by Albania ====
Points awarded by Albania (Semi-final 1)
Score	Televote	Jury
12 points	Portugal	Moldova
10 points	Sweden	Armenia
8 points	Belgium	Greece
7 points	Moldova	Azerbaijan
6 points	Greece	Portugal
5 points	Finland	Australia
4 points	Iceland	Sweden
3 points	Cyprus	Belgium
2 points	Poland	Poland
1 point	Australia	Georgia

Points awarded by Albania (Final)
Score	Televote	Jury
12 points	Italy	Italy
10 points	Bulgaria	Bulgaria
8 points	Portugal	United Kingdom
7 points	Croatia	Armenia
6 points	Hungary	Portugal
5 points	Belgium	France
4 points	Romania	Australia
3 points	Greece	Romania
2 points	Sweden	Azerbaijan
1 point	France	Greece

==== Detailed voting results ====
The following members comprised the Albanian jury:

- Haig Zacharian (jury chairperson) – professor
- Olta Boka – singer, represented Albania in the 2008 contest
- Endri Sina – composer
- Orgesa Zaimi – singer
- Marsela Çibukaj – singer (jury member in semi-final 1)
- Aulon Naci – composer (jury member in the final)

Detailed voting results from Albania (Semi-final 1)
R/O	Country	Jury							Televote	
R/O	Country	H. Zacharian	O. Boka	E. Sina	M. Çibukaj	O. Zaimi	Rank	Points	Rank	Points
01	Sweden	7	5	8	4	13	7	4	2	10
02	Georgia	4	10	16	8	8	10	1	17	
03	Australia	12	2	7	5	9	6	5	10	1
04	Albania									
05	Belgium	14	3	6	1	15	8	3	3	8
06	Montenegro	10	14	10	16	2	11		11	
07	Finland	13	9	15	7	10	12		6	5
08	Azerbaijan	5	6	2	10	3	4	7	12	
09	Portugal	8	1	11	3	11	5	6	1	12
10	Greece	1	8	1	11	4	3	8	5	6
11	Poland	9	11	3	12	6	9	2	9	2
12	Moldova	2	4	4	6	1	1	12	4	7
13	Iceland	17	17	17	13	12	17		7	4
14	Czech Republic	15	12	14	14	16	16		16	
15	Cyprus	6	13	13	9	14	13		8	3
16	Armenia	3	7	5	2	5	2	10	13	
17	Slovenia	11	15	9	15	17	14		15	
18	Latvia	16	16	12	17	7	15		14	

Detailed voting results from Albania (Final)
R/O	Country	Jury							Televote	
R/O	Country	H. Zacharian	O. Boka	E. Sina	O. Zaimi	A. Naci	Rank	Points	Rank	Points
01	Israel	15	19	17	14	11	16		15	
02	Poland	19	17	18	15	12	17		25	
03	Belarus	20	21	15	25	16	20		17	
04	Austria	25	20	23	26	23	24		22	
05	Armenia	2	6	4	5	5	4	7	24	
06	Netherlands	13	15	20	18	18	18		18	
07	Moldova	12	10	12	12	15	12		11	
08	Hungary	26	18	21	16	20	21		5	6
09	Italy	4	1	1	1	1	1	12	1	12
10	Denmark	14	11	19	13	13	14		23	
11	Portugal	10	2	5	6	2	5	6	3	8
12	Azerbaijan	17	12	9	9	10	9	2	12	
13	Croatia	21	14	13	21	22	19		4	7
14	Australia	9	8	11	4	8	7	4	13	
15	Greece	7	16	7	19	9	10	1	8	3
16	Spain	23	26	24	20	26	26		26	
17	Norway	22	24	22	17	25	22		19	
18	United Kingdom	5	3	2	2	4	3	8	14	
19	Cyprus	6	22	14	11	19	15		16	
20	Romania	16	13	6	8	7	8	3	7	4
21	Germany	18	23	25	22	24	23		21	
22	Ukraine	24	25	26	23	21	25		20	
23	Belgium	11	5	10	24	14	13		6	5
24	Sweden	8	9	16	10	17	11		9	2
25	Bulgaria	3	4	3	3	3	2	10	2	10
26	France	1	7	8	7	6	6	5	10	1
