= Eneda Tarifa =

Albanian singer (born 1982)

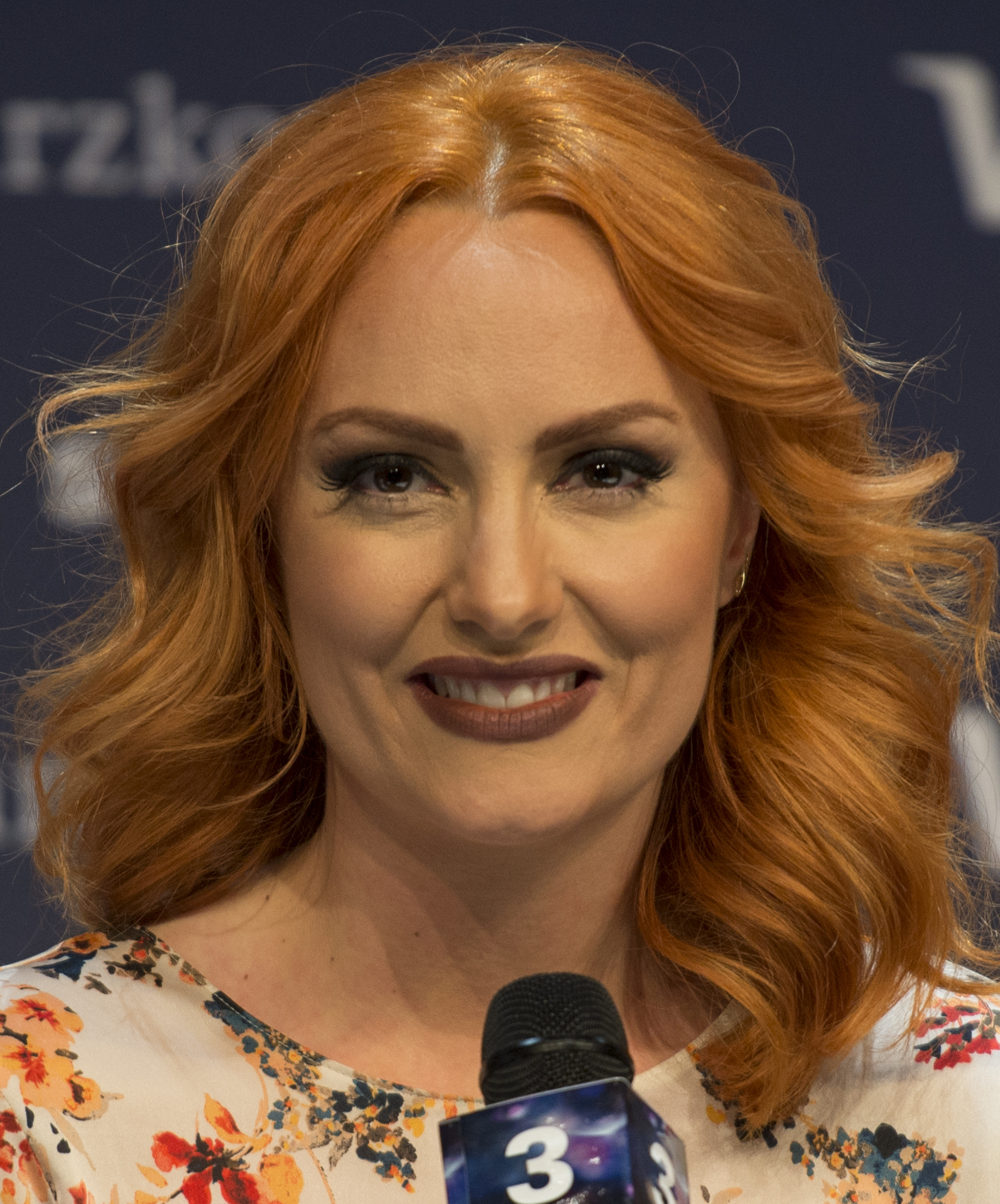
- Tarifa at the Eurovision Song Contest 2016

Background information
- Also known as: Eneida Tarifa
- Born: 30 March 1982 (age 43); Tirana, Albania
- Occupation: Singer
- Years active: 1997–present
- Label: Onima

Eneda Tarifa (born 30 March 1982) is an Albanian singer and former television presenter. She represented Albania in the Eurovision Song Contest 2016, after winning the 54th edition of Festivali i Këngës and Portokalli from 2011 to 2016.

== Life and career ==
Tarifa was born in Tirana, Albania on 30 March 1982. She began her career in 2001, participating in Kënga Magjike with the song "Ika larg". In 2003, she participated at Festivali i Këngës 42 with the song "Qëndroj", and managed to qualify to the final. In 2006, Tarifa took part in Kënga Magjike with the song "Rreth zjarrit tënd", and finished 4th in the competition with 154 points. She was also awarded the Çesk Zadeja Prize. The following year, Tarifa took part in Festivali i Këngës 46 with the song "E para letër". In the final, she was awarded 11 points and placed tenth out of seventeen. In 2008, she participated in Kënga Magjike again with the song "Zëri im" and earned 577 points. In 2010, she competed in Top Fest 2010 with the song "Me veten". She went on to win the competition, and later worked as a host on the television program Portokalli on Top Channel for many years.

After a hiatus, Tarifa returned to Festivali i Këngës in 2015 with the song "Përrallë". She went on to win the competition, representing Albania in the Eurovision Song Contest 2016 in Stockholm, Sweden. She performed her song on 12 May 2016 in the second semi-final of the competition, but didn't make it to the final.

In 2018, she was a judge on The Voice Kids Albania 2 with Ledion Liço being the host and the other judges being Miriam Cani and Aleksandër & Renis Gjoka (duo). In January 2019, announced that she will present the second season of Top Talent in Top Channel.

== Personal life ==
Tarifa is married to musician Erjon Zaloshnja. In 2013, they had a daughter together named Aria.

== Discography ==
=== Singles ===
==== As lead artist ====
Title	Year	Peak chart positions	Album
Title	Year	ALB	Album
"e shtrenjta toka ime " (with Liljana kondakci)	1997	—N/a	Non-album singles
"hapat e fundit"	2000	—N/a	Non-album singles
"pallati 176 (justina aliaj)"	2001	—N/a	Non-album singles
"Qëndroj (ardit (gjebrea"	2003	—N/a	Non-album singles
"Sytë nga ti"	2005	—N/a	Non-album singles
"ja ku jam"	2006	—N/a	Non-album singles
"i embel zeri i gjyshes"	2007	—N/a	Non-album singles
‘me degjo"	2007	—N/a	Non-album singles
"" ()	2008	—N/a	Non-album singles
“2009 muret e qytetit	2008	—N/a	Non-album singles
"Thurje"	2008	—N/a	Non-album singles
"Bunker"	2010	—N/a	Non-album singles
"Eja"	2015	—	Non-album singles
"Per Ty"	2018 (anna gjebrea)	—	Non-album singles
"Falem (Liljana kondakci)"	2019	—	Non-album singles
"s’di "	2020	—	Non-album singles
"s’mund"	2021	1	Non-album singles
""	2021	—	Non-album singles
"—" denotes a recording that did not chart or was not released in that territory.

Awards and achievements
Preceded by Elhaida Dani with "Diell"	Festivali i Këngës; Winner; 2015	Succeeded by Lindita with "Botë"
Preceded by Elhaida Dani with "I'm Alive"	Albania in the Eurovision Song Contest; 2016	Succeeded by Lindita with "World"
