= Eugent Bushpepa =

Albanian singer (born 1984)

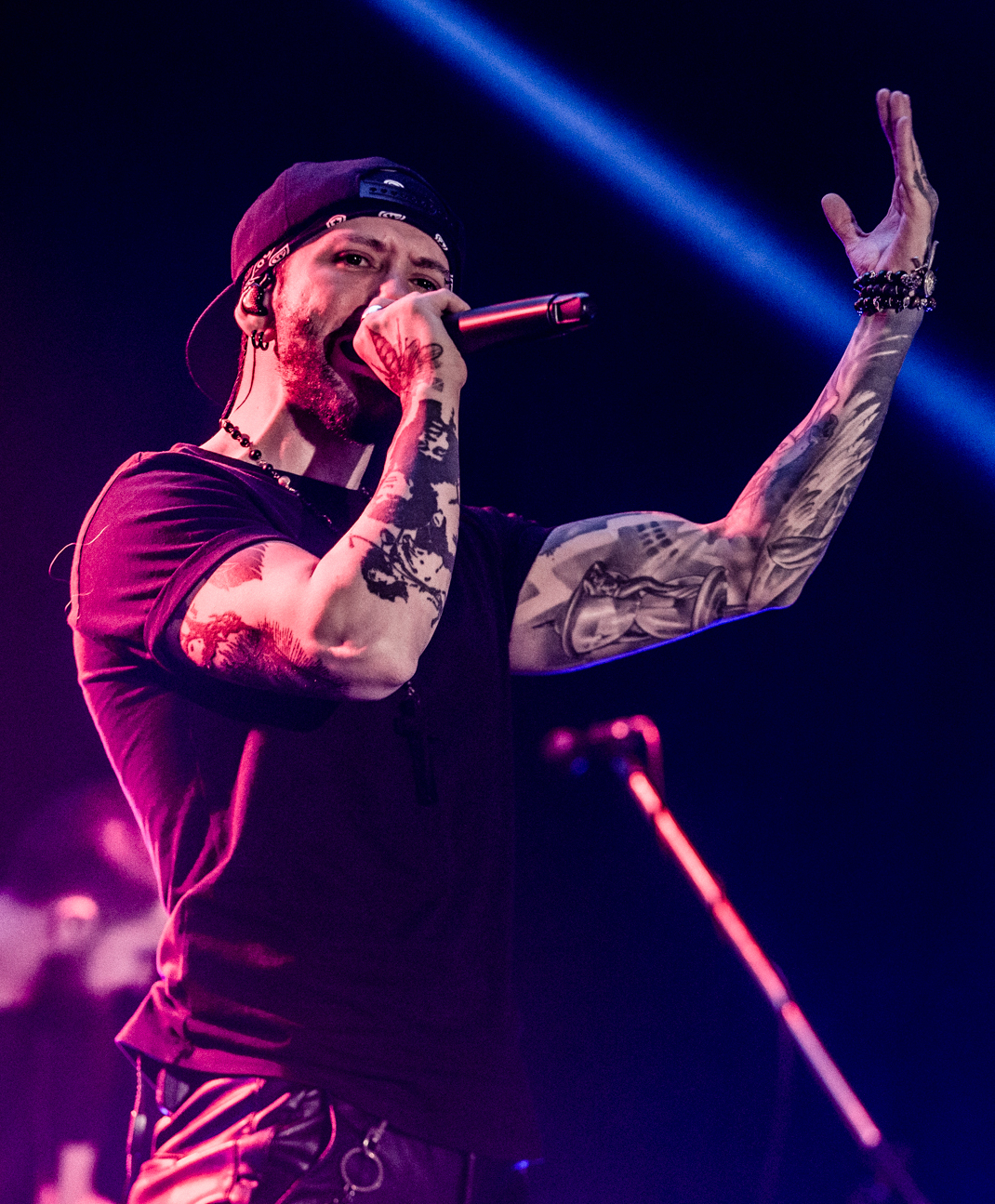
- Bushpepa in 2020

Background information
- Also known as: Gent Bushpepa
- Born: 2 July 1984 (age 42); Rrëshen, Albania
- Genres: Hard rock, industrial metal, alternative metal, pop rock
- Occupations: Singer; songwriter; composer
- Instruments: Vocals; guitar
- Years active: 1998–present
- Label: Independent

Eugent Bushpepa (Albanian pronunciation: [ɛuˈɡɛnt buʃˈpɛpa]; born 2 July 1984), also known by his alternative name Gent Bushpepa, is an Albanian singer, songwriter and composer. Regarded as one of the most popular modern rock musicians in the Albanian-speaking world, he is noted for his vocal range, vocal power, high-energy live performances, and is also recognised as an accomplished guitarist.

Bushpepa and his band were the supporting acts on the concert tours of Deep Purple in 2007, Duff McKagan (Guns N' Roses) in 2011 and Overkill in 2014. On 18 August 2013, he performed a full concert with Ron "Bumblefoot" Thal. Bushpepa is the sole author of his song which was reworked for the Eurovision by Jim Lowe, a Grammy Award-winning British record producer and audio engineer.

In 2017, Bushpepa won the 56th edition of Festivali i Këngës with the song "Mall" and went on to represent Albania in the Eurovision Song Contest 2018 in Lisbon. He reached eleventh place in the grand final in a field of twenty-six and achieved the country's fourth highest placement to date.

== Life and career ==
Eugent Bushpepa was born on 2 July 1984 into an Albanian family of the Roman Catholic faith in the town of Rrëshen, then part of the People's Republic of Albania, present Albania. He started singing at the age of six while his guitar training began in the fifth grade of primary school. After finishing high school, he moved to Bologna, Italy, to study medicine where he completed his first academic year.

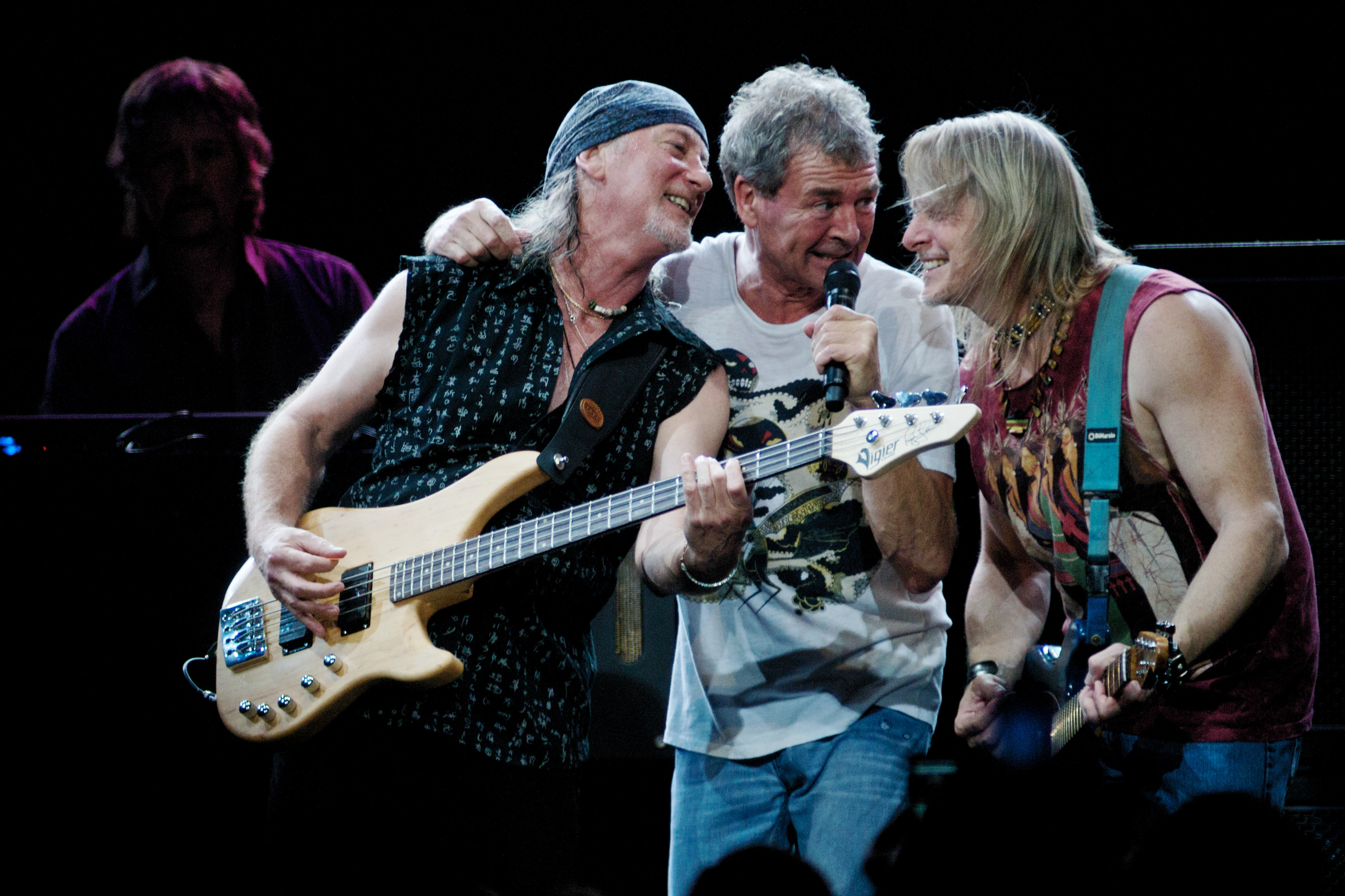
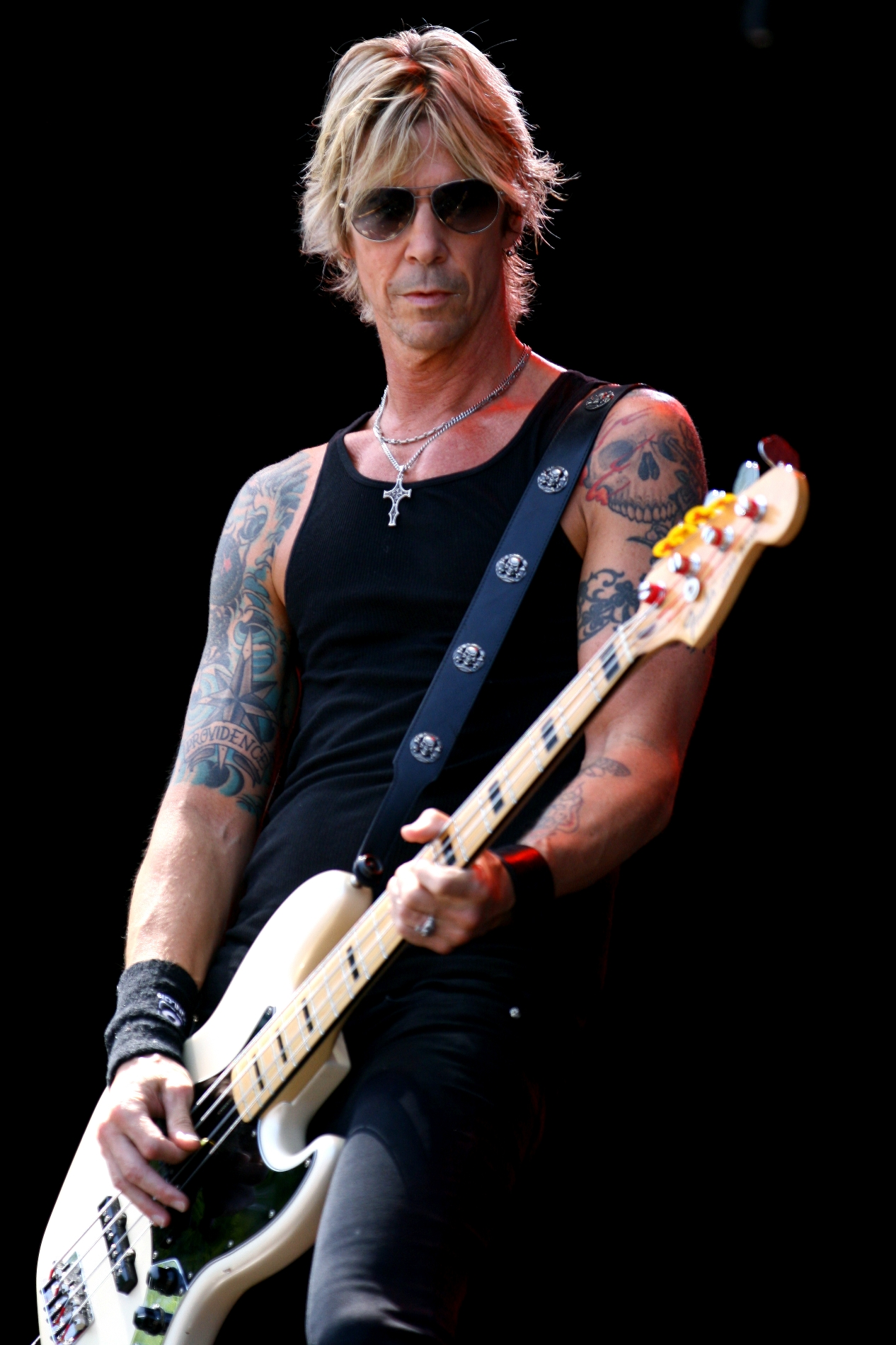
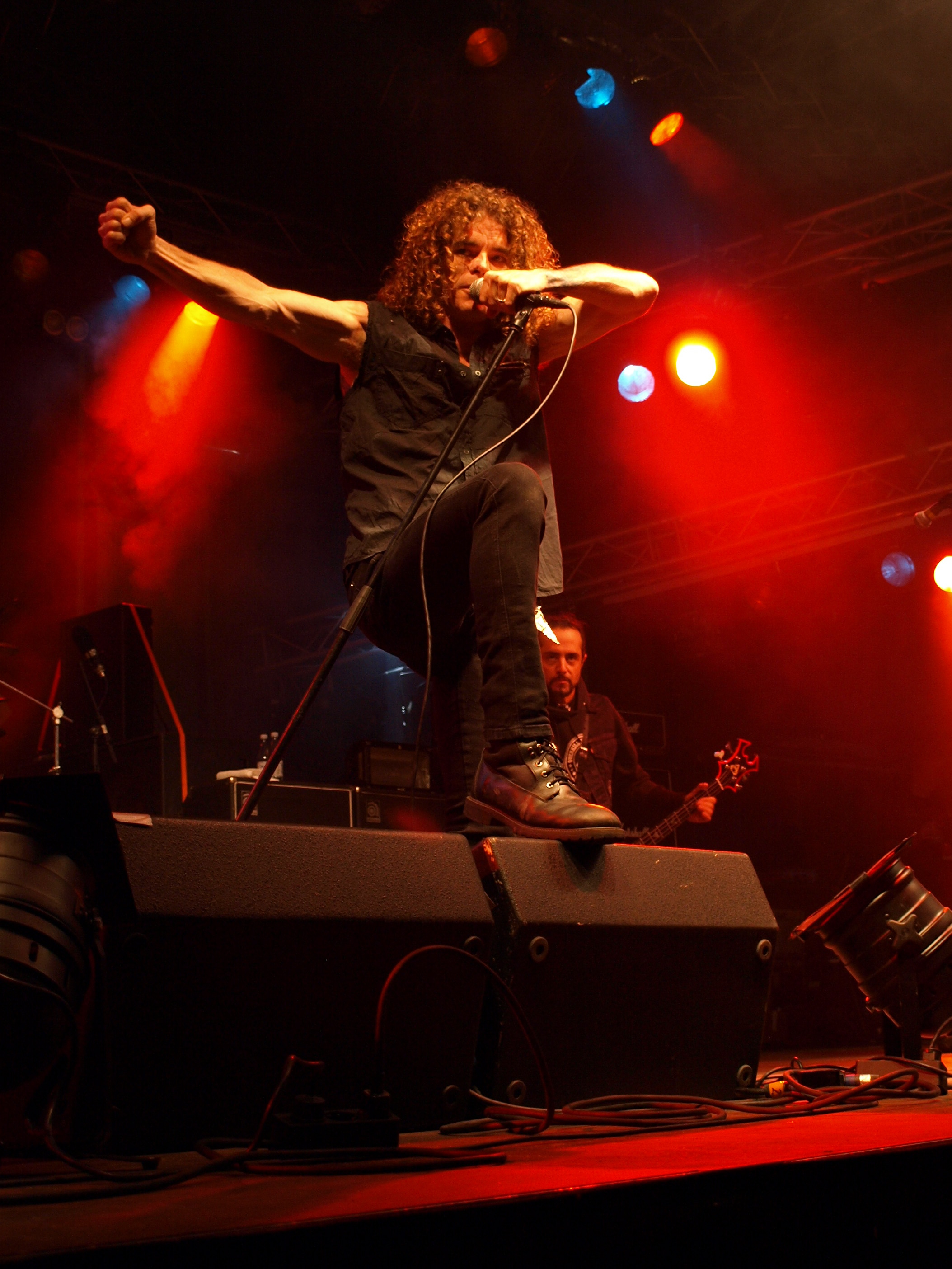
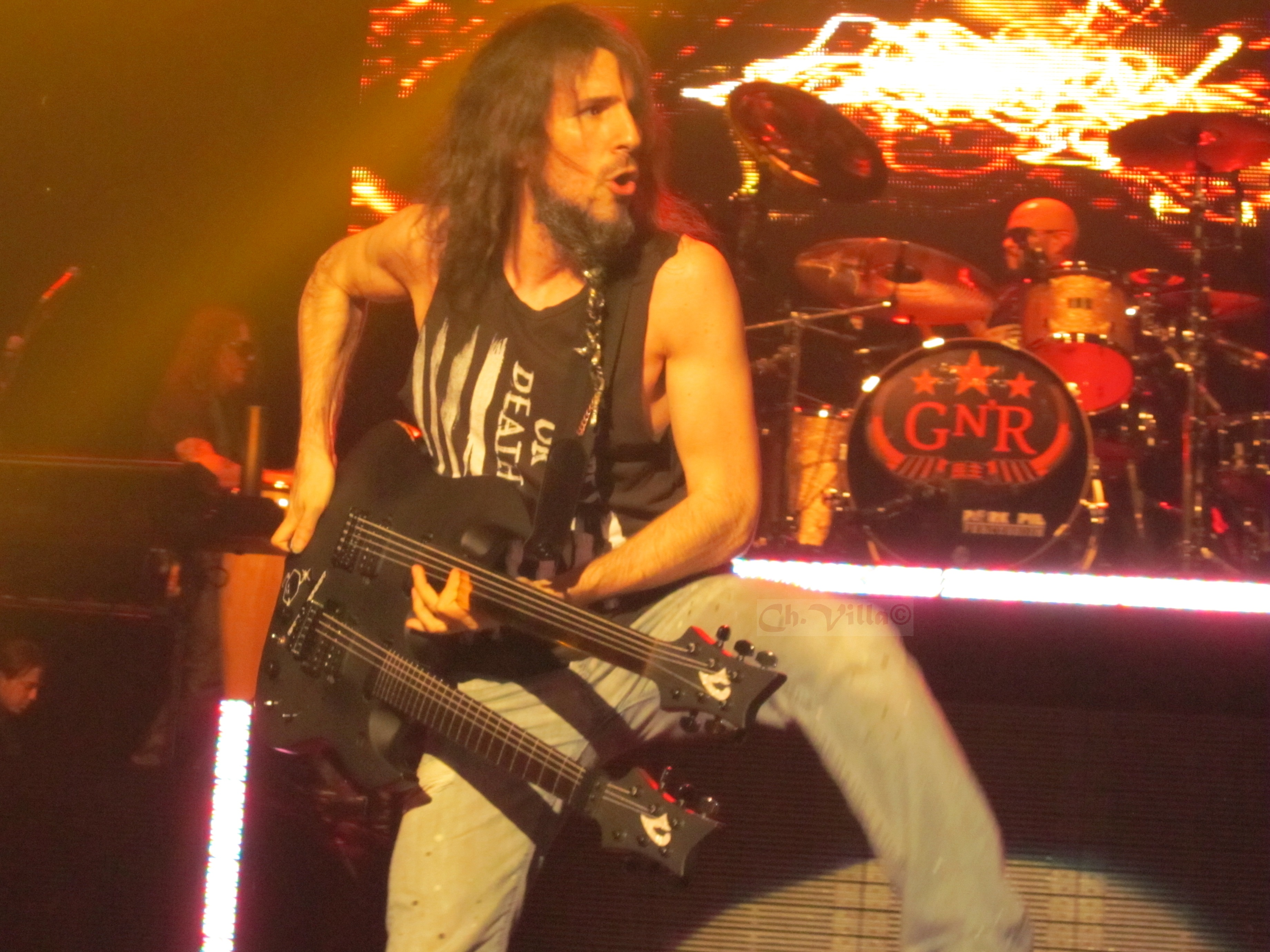
Clockwise from upper left: Bushpepa has opened for Deep Purple in 2007, Duff McKagan (Guns N' Roses) in 2011, Overkill in 2014, and has performed with Ron "Bumblefoot" Thal in 2013.

Bushpepa's professional career began in 2006 and since then he has been active in the Albanian music scene. His national breakthrough came with the song "Maska e Madhështisë", released in 2007 at Top Fest 4. In the same competition, he also teamed up with a rock band called Sunrise, performing their song Engjëll, and then he went on to play in major music festivals and worked on new music. Although Eugent made his professional stage debut in Kënga Magjike at the age of fourteen, his music career was jump-started upon his return to Albania in 2006 where he was set to pursue a medical degree in dentistry and started to perform live shows in various night clubs and pubs alongside studies. Writing and performing his own material, Bushpepa had also made various live covers and appeared in over 2000 live shows since his beginnings.

He was asked to become the supporting act for Duff McKagan for a concert in Tirana on their Loaded band tour on 1 June 2011. During a traditional beer festival in Korçë on 18 August 2013, Bushpepa performed with Ron "Bumblefoot" Thal, the guitarist of Guns N' Roses. In 2014, he joined the band Darkology as their tour vocalist, replacing Kelly Sundown Carpenter in their Killfest tour with Overkill, Prong, and Enforcer who performed in various cities in Spain, Portugal, Italy, Switzerland, Germany, and the Netherlands.

In early to mid 2017, Bushpepa had signed on as an adviser in The Voice of Albania, assisting Besa's team, whereas on 24 December 2017, he won the 56th edition of Festivali i Këngës, the longest-running annual televised music competition in Albania since 1962, and thus represented Albania at the Eurovision Song Contest 2018 in Lisbon, Portugal with his song "Mall".

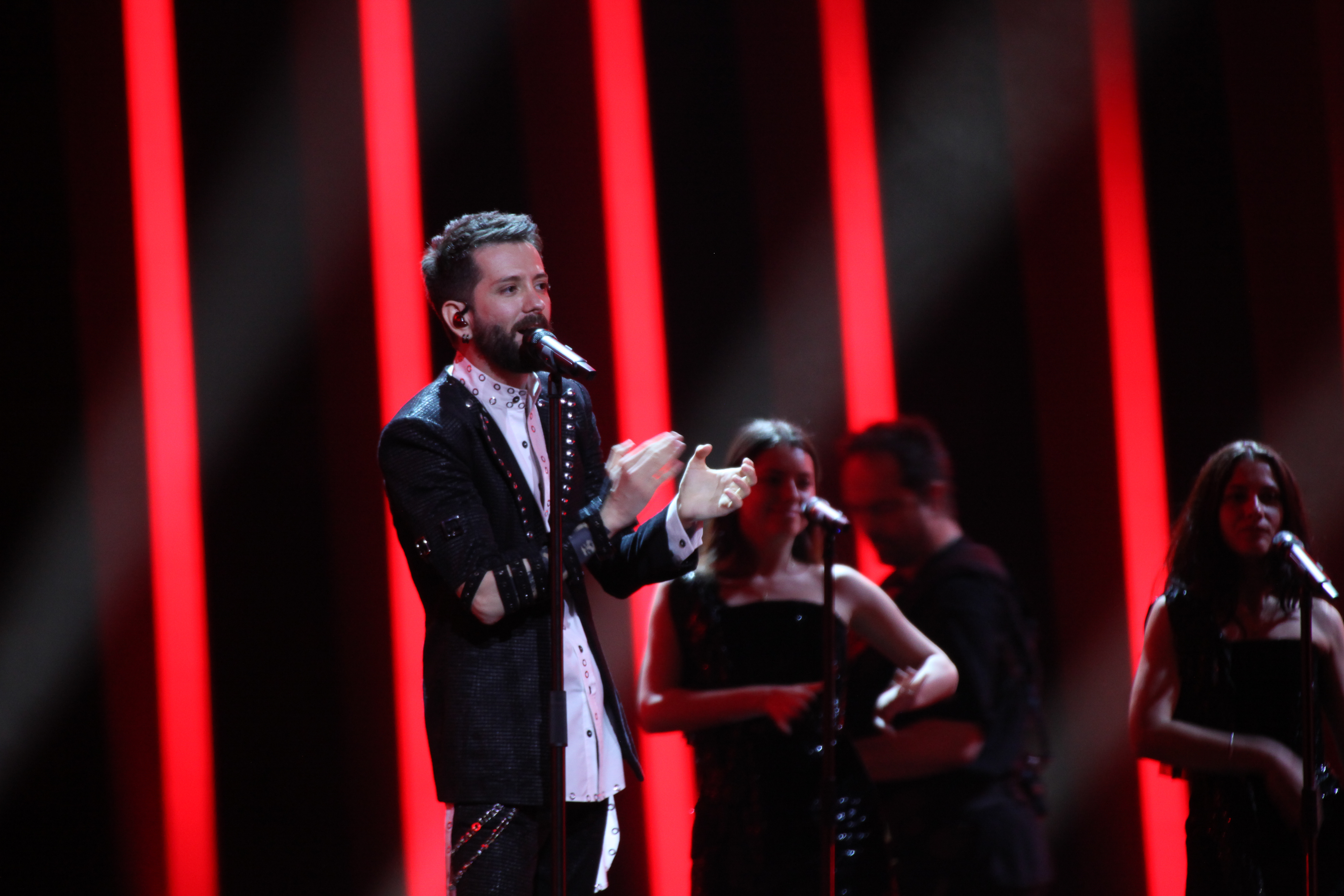
Eugent Bushpepa performing during a rehearsal before the grand final.

In December 2017, Radio Televizioni Shqiptar (RTSH) announced him as the Albanian representative for the Eurovision Song Contest 2018 in Lisbon, Portugal, after he won the 56th edition of Festivali i Këngës with his song "Mall".

The Eurovision version was reworked by Bushpepa and Jim Lowe, a Grammy Award-winning audio engineer, and was released through Universal Music on 16 April. Bushpepa's promotional tour in London and Tel Aviv were postponed due to visa delays, but he resumed the tour in Amsterdam and Madrid that advanced with great success. Albania was drawn to compete third at the first-semi final in which Bushpepa performed "Mall" third in a field of nineteen participants and qualified for the Grand Final being among the top ten most-voted acts. In the final, the song was performed twelfth in a field of twenty-six and ranked seventh with the juries and eleventh with a combined televote score.

In 2023, Bushpepa started a podcast called "Garage Lock", a collaboration with fellow rock vocalist Renis Gjoka.

== Discography ==
Bushpepa has released no album to date; though he deems himself as a "non-commercial artist" and stated that he is working on his debut album following requests from his fans.

=== Singles ===
==== As lead artist ====
Title	Year	Peak chart positions	Album
Title	Year	ALB	Album
"Maska e madhështisë"	2007	—N/a	Non-album singles
"Engjëll"	2007	—N/a	Non-album singles
"Ëndërr reale" (featuring Gled Mikerezi)	2008	—N/a	Non-album singles
"S'jam Baladë" (featuring Rovena Dilo)	2008	—N/a	Non-album singles
"Stinë dreqi"	2009	—N/a	Non-album singles
"Rebel pa hije"	2011	—N/a	Break The Darkness
"Udhëtari"	2012	—N/a	Non-album singles
"Viktimë"	2013	—N/a	Non-album singles
"Pranë finishit"	2015	—N/a	Non-album singles
"Mall"	2018	—N/a	Non-album singles
"Stay with Me Tonight"	2020	1	Non-album singles
"Cùll të Hutù"	2021	—N/a	Break The Darkness
"I imi Flokë Argjend"	2021	—N/a	Break The Darkness
"Ego" (featuring Bojken Lako and Erdion Hoxha)	2021	—N/a	Break The Darkness
"Koha Ndryshk"	2021	—N/a	Break The Darkness
"Rezisto" (featuring Renis Gjoka)	2023	—N/a	Non-album singles
"—" denotes a recording that did not chart or was not released in that territory.

== Awards ==
Top Fest

Year	Nominee / work	Award	Result
2008	"Ëndërr reale"	Best Male Singer	Won
2009	"Stinë dreqi"	Vodafone Club Award	Won
2011	"Rebel pa hije"	Best Male Singer	Won
2015	"Pranë finishit"	Honorific Award	Won
2017	"Mall"	Festivali i 56 i Këngës	Won
2018	"Mall"	Eurovision Song Contest	11th Place

== See also ==
- Festivali i Këngës 56
- Albania in the Eurovision Song Contest 2018

Awards and achievements
Preceded by Lindita with "Botë"	Festivali i Këngës; Winner; 2017	Succeeded by Jonida Maliqi with "Ktheju tokës"
Preceded by Lindita with "World"	Albania in the Eurovision Song Contest; 2018	Succeeded by Jonida Maliqi with "Ktheju tokës"
