= Stay with Me Tonight =

Stay with Me Tonight may refer to:

- Stay with Me Tonight (album) or the title song, by Jeffrey Osborne, 1983
- "Stay with Me Tonight" (Eugent Bushpepa song), 2020
- "Stay with Me Tonight" (The Human League song), 1996
- "Stay with Me Tonight" (TVXQ song), 2005
- "Stay with Me Tonight", by Mandy Smith from Mandy, 1988; co-written and originally recorded by Rick Astley
- "Stay with Me Tonight", by Quiet Riot from QR 1988
