= Stay with Me Tonight (Eugent Bushpepa song) =

2020 single by Eugent Bushpepa

"Stay With Me Tonight"
- The official cover art for "Stay With Me Tonight" shot by Renuar Locaj

Single by Eugent Bushpepa
- Released: 21 February 2020
- Genre: Rock
- Length: 3:54
- Label: Independent
- Songwriter: Eugent Bushpepa
- Producer: Eugent Bushpepa

Eugent Bushpepa singles chronology
"Mall" (2018)	"Stay With Me Tonight" (2020)	"Cùll të Hutu" (2021)

Music video
- "Stay With Me Tonight" on YouTube

"Stay With Me Tonight" is a song recorded by Albanian singer and songwriter Eugent Bushpepa. Lasting three minutes and fifty four seconds, the song was written and produced by the singer. The official music video for the song was shot in Italy and directed by Renuar Locaj; it was released on 12 February 2020 on YouTube to accompany the single's release. It features scenes with Bushpepa and Albanian model Adrola Dushi focusing on the singer's relationship with his girlfriend.

== Background and composition ==
"Stay With Me Tonight" has a duration time of three minutes and fifty four seconds and was solely written and produced by Bushpepa. It was composed in 4/4 time and is performed in the key of E major with a tempo of 135 beats per minute. It is his first single in over two years after "Mall", with which he participated at the Eurovision Song Contest 2018. Lyrically, the focuses on the theme of losing love, and choices that can be made in difficult situations.

== Music video ==
The accompanying music video was directed by Renuar Locaj and premiered on Bushpepa's YouTube channel on 12 February 2020. The clip was filmed during winter in various locations in the city of Rome, Italy. It features a guest appearance from the Albanian model Adrola Dushi. The song was released on digital platforms and to streaming services as a single on 21 February 2020.

== Track listing ==
- Digital download
1. "Stay with Me Tonight" – 3:54

== Charts ==
Chart performance for "Stay with Me Tonight"
Chart (2020)	Peak position
Albania (The Top List)	1

== Release history ==
Release dates and formats for "Stay with Me Tonight"
Region	Date	Format(s)	Label	Ref.
Various	21 February 2020	Digital download; streaming	Independent	
