= Fairytale (Eneda Tarifa song) =

2016 song by Eneda Tarifa

Single by Eneda Tarifa
- Released: 30 March 2016
- Studio: Woodstock, London, UK
- Genre: Pop-Rock
- Length: 3:00
- Label: RTSH; Universal
- Songwriter: Olsa Toqi

Eneda Tarifa singles chronology
"Me vetën" (2010)	"Fairytale" (2016)	"Ma zgjat dorën" (2019)

Music video
- "Fairytale" on YouTube

Eurovision Song Contest 2016 entry
- Country: Albania
- Artist: Eneda Tarifa
- Language: English
- Composer: Olsa Toqi
- Lyricist: Olsa Toqi

Finals performance
- Semi-final result: 16th
- Semi-final points: 45

Entry chronology
- ◄ "I'm Alive" (2015)
- "World" (2017) ►

"Fairytale" is a song by Albanian singer Eneda Tarifa. It was issued as a single on 30 March 2016 by Radio Televizioni Shqiptar (RTSH) and Universal Music. An English-language mid-tempo power rock ballad, the song was composed and written by Olsa Toqi. An accompanying music video was premiered to the official YouTube channel of the Eurovision Song Contest on 13 March 2016. The song represented Albania in the Eurovision Song Contest 2016 in Stockholm, Sweden, after Tarifa's victory at the country's pre-selection competition Festivali i Këngës with the song's Albanian-language version "Përrallë". It failed to qualify for the grand final also marking the country's sixth non-qualification in the contest. During her minimalistic performance, she was accompanied by three backing vocalists while the LED screens showed a variety of gold images.

== Background and composition ==
In 2015, Eneda Tarifa was announced as one of the contestants selected to compete at the 54th edition of Festivali i Këngës, a competition to determine Albania's participant for the Eurovision Song Contest 2016. Following the competition's rules, the lyrics of the participating entries had to be in the Albanian language. Tarifa took part with the song "Përrallë", written and composed by Olsa Toqi. For the purpose of the singer's Eurovision Song Contest participation, the latter song was remastered and translated to "Fairytale". It was recorded and reworked at Woodstock Studios in London, the United Kingdom. A reviewer of Wiwibloggs described the song as a mid-tempo power ballad, while Nicole Janke of Eurovision.de called it a rock ballad. During an interview with Wiwibloggs, Tarifa explained in regard to the revamp that she had to shorten the song and "wanted to make it feel more rhythmic for Eurovision".

== Critical reception ==
"Fairytale" received generally positive reviews from contemporary critics and mixed to negative remarks from Wiwibloggs. Metro writer, Caroline Westbrook, elaborated, "If James Bond were to have an Albanian makeover and pursue bad guys through the streets of Tirana, we reckon this might just be his theme tune". Michael Carr from Music Feeds dubbed the singer as an "over the top emotive diva" and saying, "considering Dami Im is following a similar music path with her offering this year, she better watch out for Eneda Tarifa". Among the reviewers of Wiwibloggs, the Albanian-language version, "Përralle", was viewed favourably over "Fairytale". Many considered that the song should have been presented in Albanian, whilst dubbing the revamp as "creepy" and a "nightmare". In a poll conducted by Wiwibloggs titled "Has Eneda Tarifa turned “Fairytale” into a nightmare?", the voters chose "Përralle" over "Fairytale" with over 1,400 votes.

== Music video and promotion ==
Following a revamp, an accompanying music video premiered on the official YouTube channel of the Eurovision Song Contest on 13 March 2016. It begins with an ambiguous imagery of Eneda's face covered in a red pleat headdress while standing in front of an illuminated stairway. After uncloaking, the video follows with a theatrical scenery depicting a massive surreal clockwork as a background and then an outdoor scene of Eneda on a swing while sitting in seiza position. However, those three scenes are prominently intercut throughout the complete video. For promotional and supporting purposes, Tarifa made several appearances throughout Europe to specifically promote "Fairytale", including in Amsterdam's Eurovision in Concert, Eurovision Party in London and Israel Calling in Tel Aviv.

== At Eurovision ==
=== Festivali i Këngës ===
The national broadcaster of Albania, Radio Televizioni Shqiptar (RTSH), organised the 54th edition of Festivali i Këngës to select the country's entrant for the Eurovision Song Contest 2016. It took place in December 2015, for which 30 songs had been internally shortlisted by a jury panel consisting of music professionals. During the grand final held on 27 December 2015, Eneda Tarifa and her Albanian-language song "Përralle" were chosen to represent in Albania in the contest, after the votes of an expert jury panel were combined.

=== Stockholm ===
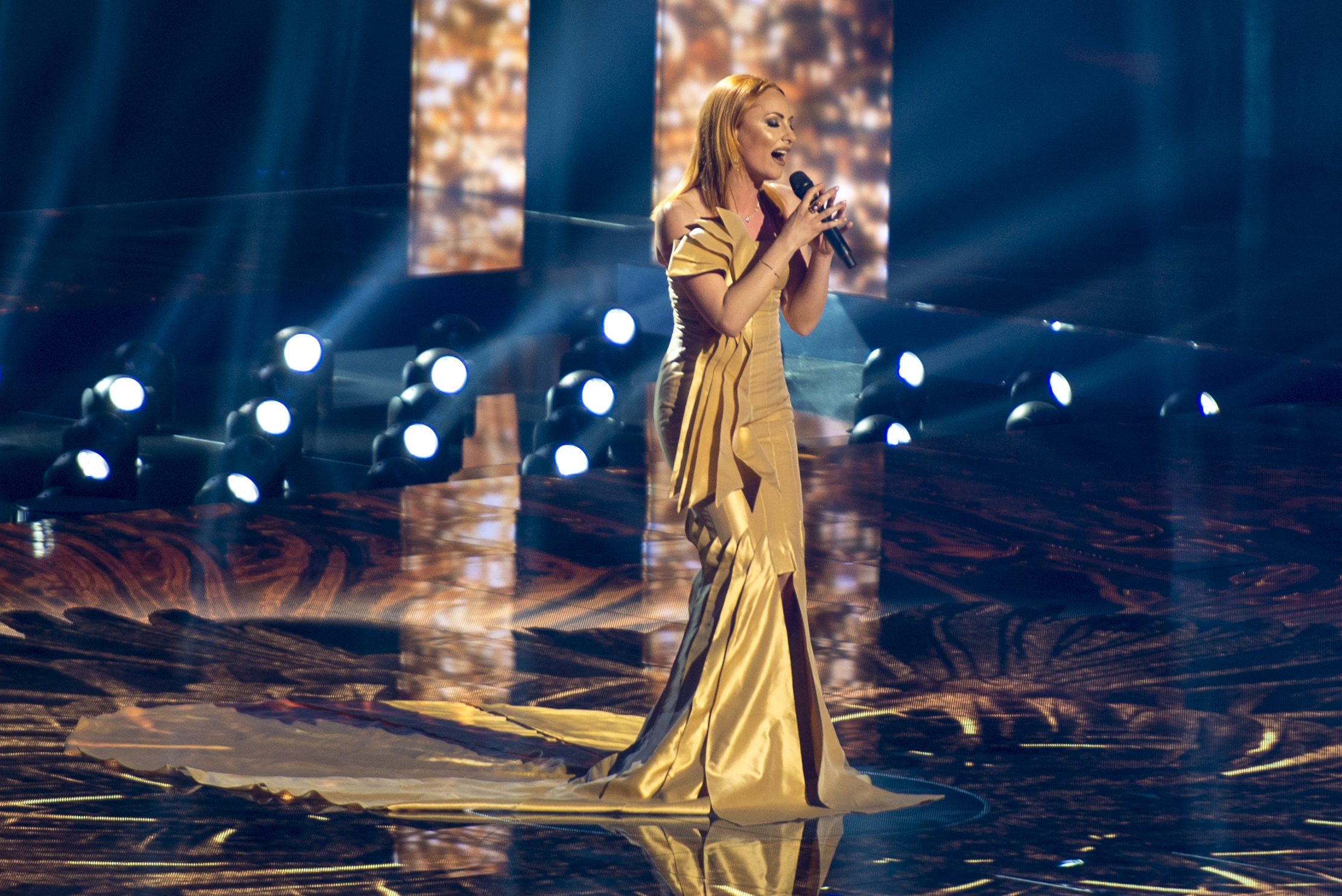
Eneda Tarifa performing during a rehearsal prior the second semi-final in Stockholm.

The 61st edition of the Eurovision Song Contest took place in Stockholm, Sweden, and consisted of two semi-finals on 10 and 12 May, and the grand final on 14 May 2016. According to the Eurovision rules, each participating country, except the host country and the "Big Five", consisting of France, Germany, Italy, Spain and the United Kingdom, were required to qualify from one of two semi-finals to compete for the grand final, although, the top ten countries from the respective semi-final progress to the grand final. On 25 January 2016, it was announced that Albania will be performing in the second half of the second semi-final of the contest. During the live show, Albania performed seventeenth following Georgia and preceding Belgium. The country eventually failed to qualify for the grand final in sixteenth place with 45 points ranking eighteenth by the jury's 10 points and twelfth by the televote of 35 points.

Eneda performed the song along with three backing vocalists on the main stage. A warm atmosphere was created by a "gold-ground" backdrop and theatrical smoke which gave the act a soft focus effect. Eneda wore a long golden dress with a chapel train that "united" with the golden centre of the stage floor when filmed from above.

== Release history ==
Region	Date	Format(s)	Label	Ref.
Russia	30 March 2016	Digital download; streaming	RTSH; Universal	
