= Renuar Locaj =

Albanian photographer

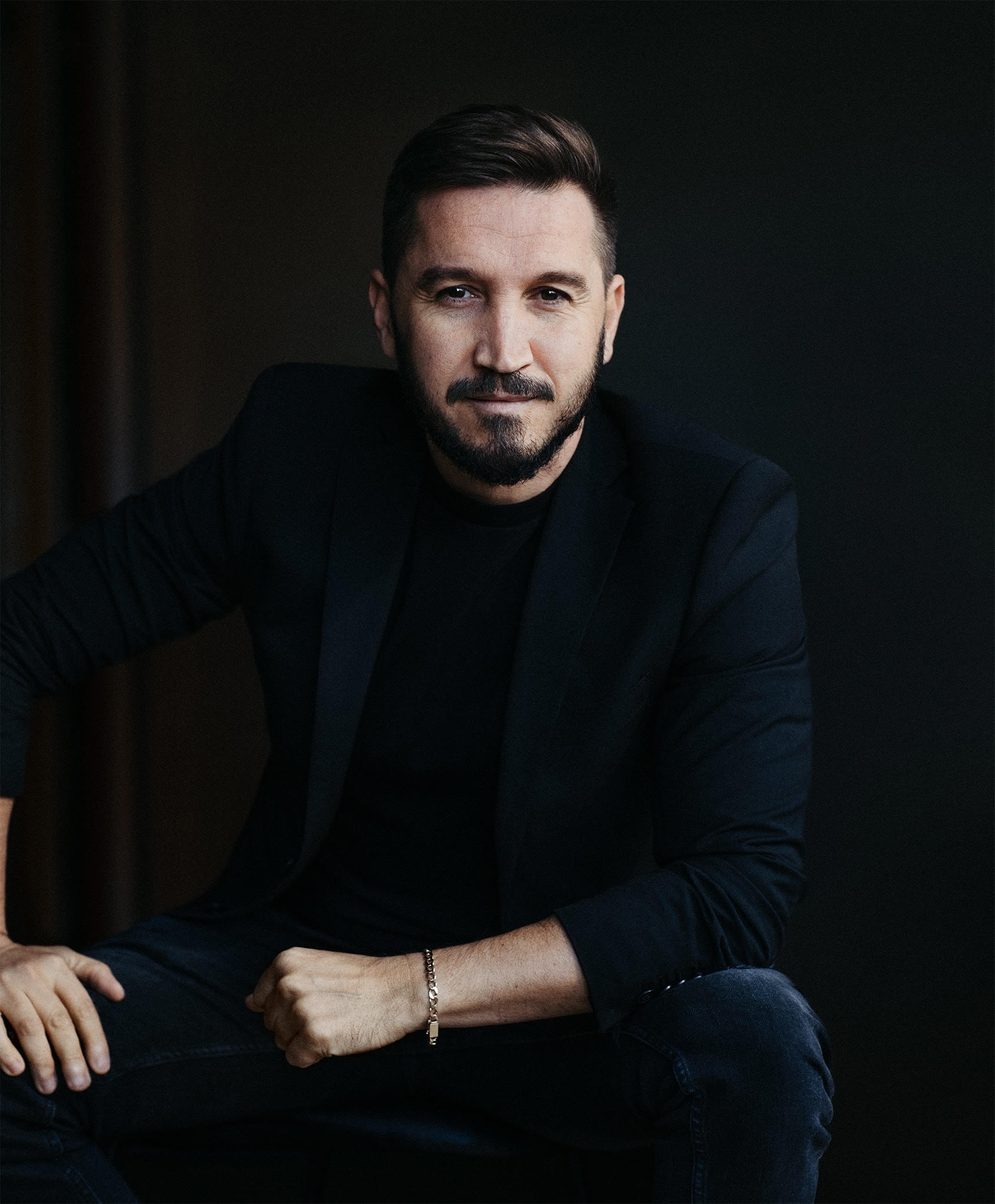
- Born: 14 April 1982 (age 43); Albania
- Occupation: Photographer
- Years active: 2008–present
- Website: renuarlocaj.com

Renuar Locaj (born 14 April 1982) is an Albanian photographer.

== Education and career ==
In 1997, he attended the Art School Jordan Misja in Tirana. He later studied arts at the University of Arts in Tirane, Albania.

In 2017 he won the Gold Award in the category of Press/Performing Arts in the competition organized by Prix de la Photographie, Paris. In 2021 he opened his exhibition of photography in the documentary genre in the Albanian National and Historic Museum.
