= Mall (song) =

2018 song by Eugent Bushpepa

Single by Eugent Bushpepa
- Language: Albanian
- Released: 6 April 2018
- Studio: Brussels, Belgium
- Genre: Classical rock; folk rock
- Length: 3:00 (Eurovision version); 4:32 (extended version)
- Label: RTSH; Universal
- Songwriter: Eugent Bushpepa
- Producers: Eugent Bushpepa; Jim Lowe

Eugent Bushpepa singles chronology
| "Pranë Finishit" (2015) | "Mall" (2018) | "Stay with me Tonight" (2020) |

Music video
- Mall on YouTube

Eurovision Song Contest 2018 entry
- Country: Albania
- Artist: Eugent Bushpepa
- Language: Albanian
- Composer: Eugent Bushpepa
- Lyricist: Eugent Bushpepa

Finals performance
- Semi-final result: 8th
- Semi-final points: 162
- Final result: 11th
- Final points: 184

Entry chronology
- ◄ "World" (2017)
- "Ktheju tokës" (2019) ►

"Mall" (Albanian: [maɫ]; transl. Yearning) is a song composed and written by Albanian singer and songwriter Eugent Bushpepa. It was released as a single on 6 April 2018 by Radio Televizioni Shqiptar (RTSH) and Universal Music. The song has been described as an Albanian language 1980s-inspired classical folk rock ballad. In its love-themed lyrics, it captures the feeling of longing and also reflects both the deep loneliness and the burning desire of a reunion.

The song represented Albania in the Eurovision Song Contest 2018 in Lisbon, Portugal, after winning the pre-selection competition Festivali i Këngës. It ultimately reached eleventh place in a field of twenty-six, scoring a total of one hundred and eighty four points marking the country's fourth highest placement to date. During his minimalistic performance, Bushpepa was accompanied by two backing vocalists and his band consisting of a drummer, bassist and a guitarist.

An accompanying music video premiered on the official YouTube channel of the Eurovision Song Contest on 26 March 2018. Filmed in black and white, it incorporates elements of ethnic Albanian culture and the concept of love at first sight. "Mall" received a favourable response from music critics upon its release, with some praising its composition, lyrics and Bushpepa's vocals. For promotion and support, the singer performed the song live on numerous occasions, including in Amsterdam and Madrid.

== Background and composition ==
'Mall'
A 23-second sample of "Mall", a classical rock 1980s-influenced ballad with folk elements.

In 2017, Eugent Bushpepa was among the confirmed contestants to compete at the 56th edition of Festivali i Këngës, the country's national competition to select their entry for the Eurovision Song Contest 2018. He participated with the master version of "Mall" which had a duration time of more than four minutes. The song was later shortened and remastered in Brussels, Belgium, due to Eurovision's performative requirements on songs length. It was released on digital platforms and streaming services as a single on 6 April 2018 through Radio Televizioni Shqiptar (RTSH) and Universal Music.

"Mall" was composed and written by Eugent Bushpepa while being produced by himself and British producer Jim Lowe. The Albanian language song, which lasts three minutes, is a 1980s-influenced classical folk rock ballad merged with folk. While his fiancée was the central narrative, Bushpepa solely wrote the lyrics and penned the song based on his own saudade perspective in the time when he was far away from her.

== Critical reception ==
Following the victory at Festivali i Këngës, "Mall" received generally positive response from music critics. Wiwibloggs writer, William Lee Adams, commented that the song was a "definite grower" and a "true standout that year in Festivali i Këngës amongst old rockers and diva powerhouse". After the revamp, Adams described the song as "more efficient" and a "high-impact piece" retaining "its anthemic quality". Other reviewers from Wiwibloggs, including Deban Aderemi and Jordi Pedra, had both positive and mixed opinions praising Bushpepa's vocal potential and stage presence, but also criticising the genre of the song.

The live performances of "Mall" were heavily praised by music critics and fans with a critic describing Bushpepa's "emotional" and "confident" vocal delivery as "faultless" and "majestic". In a poll conducted by Wiwibloggs titled "Who gave the best live performance at Eurovision In Concert 2018?", the singer finished in first place with over 2,600 votes. After Bushpepa's participation at the Eurovision Song Contest, the president of Albania, Ilir Meta, welcomed him on 17 May 2018 to his official residence in Tirana and joined him by doing the sign of the horns. "Mall" was further named as the song of the year at the 2018 Kult Awards in November 2018.

== Music video and promotion ==
An accompanying music video for "Mall" was released to the official YouTube channel of the Eurovision Song Contest on 26 March 2018. Before that, a promotional video featuring the performance footage of Bushpepa and his band at the music rehearsal space, was premiered on 16 March 2018. The music video was filmed by Anima Pictures and directed by Ajola Xoxa. Shot in black and white, the script incorporates elements of love at first sight with dual interpretation of the song's lyrical content aiming at a couple longing to pursuit their amorous fusion whilst being hindered by distance and other factors. Bushpepa's brief cameo is intercut several times, and as the video progresses, it features Albanian folk elements showcasing ballet dancers wearing a xhubleta and traditional Albanian fustanella while performing choreography over a bentonite clay dust covered floor. Towards the music video ending, the embracing couple drifts aloft on the air, the crowd stands in awe, and the singer concludes by clapping his hands in glee.

For promotional and supporting purposes, Bushpepa made several appearances throughout Europe to specifically promote his song with live performances in Amsterdam and Madrid. He was additionally scheduled to perform in London but was forced to withdraw due to visa issues. In April 2018, he appeared to sing his song live on the Albanian television show The Voice Kids. Outside of the promotion phase, "Mall" was featured at number 37 in 2018 and 53 in the 2019 edition of the Eurovision Top 250 charts. While in quarantine during the pandemic of the coronavirus disease 2019 (COVID-19), footage of Bushpepa performing the song in a private ambience was broadcast during the Eurovision Home Concerts on 24 April 2020.

== At Eurovision ==
=== Festivali i Këngës ===
The national broadcaster, Radio Televizioni Shqiptar (RTSH), organised the 56th edition of Festivali i Këngës in order to select Albania's entry for the Eurovision Song Contest 2018 in Lisbon, Portugal. A jury panel, consisting of music professionals, internally selected 22 songs out of 70 to participate in the competition's semi-finals. Subsequently, after the grand final, Eugent Bushpepa and his Albanian-language song "Mall" was chosen to represent the country at the contest.

=== Eurovision Song Contest ===
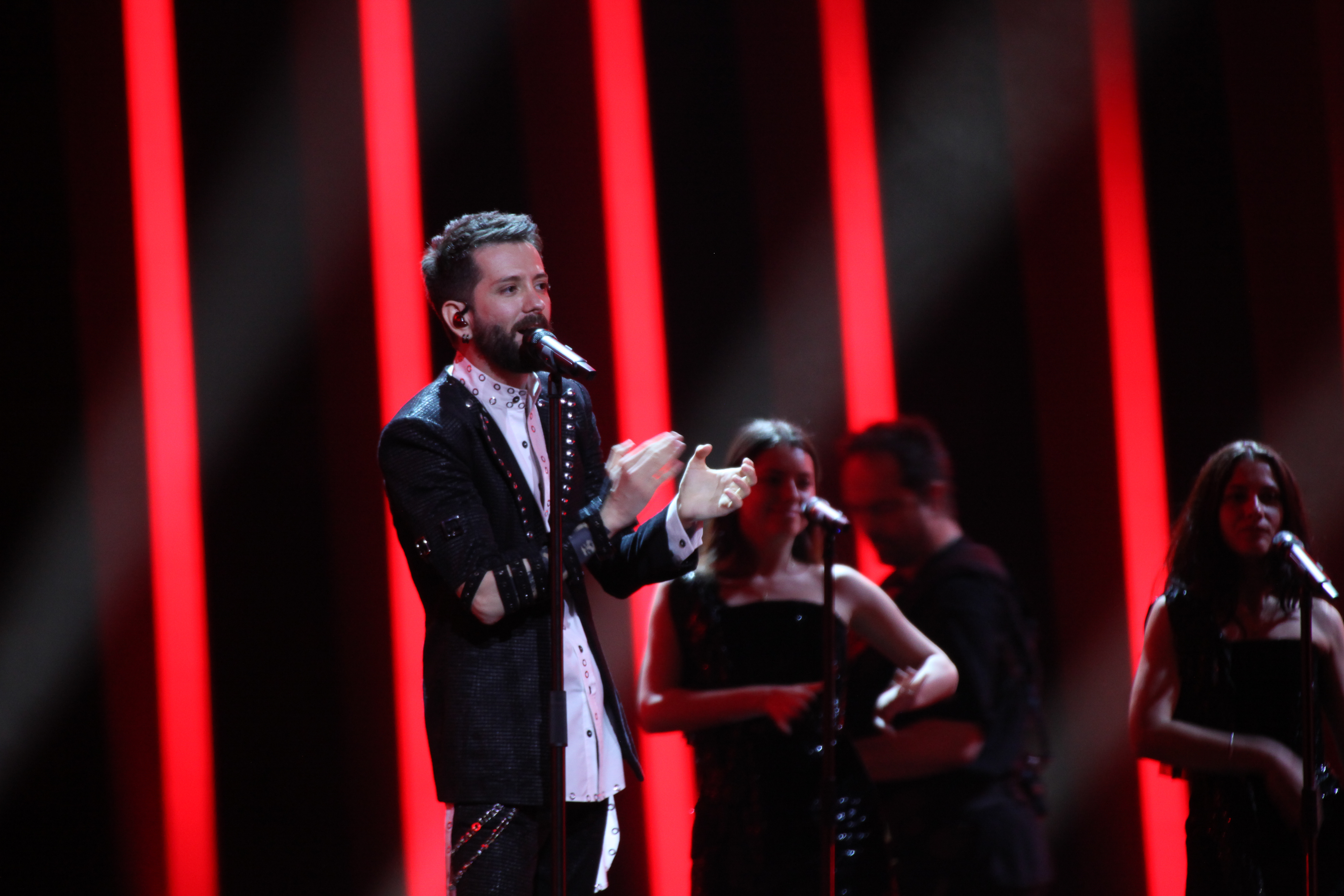
Eugent Bushpepa performing during a rehearsal. His performance featured flashing lights including plenty of "Albanian" red.

The 63rd edition of the Eurovision Song Contest took place in Lisbon, Portugal, and consisted of two semi-finals on 8 and 10 May, and the grand final on 12 May 2018. According to the Eurovision rules, each participating country, except the host country and the "Big Five", consisting of France, Germany, Italy, Spain and the United Kingdom, were required to qualify from one of two semi-finals to compete for the grand final, although, the top ten countries from the respective semi-final progress to the grand final. On 29 January 2018, it was announced that "Mall" would be performed in the first half of the first semi-final of the contest.

Albania performed third in the first semi-final, following Iceland and preceding Belgium. During the first semi-final, the country qualified for the grand final in eighth place with 162 points on 8 May 2018 ranking third by the jury's 114 points and eleventh by the televote of 48 points. Soon after, it was scheduled to perform twelfth in the grand final following Germany and preceding France. It eventually reached eleventh place in a field of twenty-six with 184 points on 12 May 2018 placed seventh by the jury's 126 points and eighteenth by the televote of 58 points. The performance of Bushpepa begins with black and blue tones on the LED screens, changing throughout his performance to warmer tones consisting of red, yellow and white, as the song reaches its climax. The singer was accompanied during his performances by two female backing vocalists and a small band, consisting of a drummer, guitarist and a bass player.

== Personnel ==
Credits adapted from Tidal.

- Eugent Bushpepa – composing, producing, songwriting, vocals
- Jim Lowe – mixing, producing
- Ajola Xoxa – video directing

== Track listing ==
- Digital download
1. "Mall" (Eurovision version) – 3:00
2. "Mall" (Karaoke version) – 3:00
- EU promo CD
1. "Mall" (Live at "Festivali i Këngës 56") – 4:34
2. "Mall" (Eurovision version) – 3:00
3. "Mall" (Karaoke version) – 3:00
4. "Mall" (Instrumental version) – 3:00
- EU promo DVD
1. "Mall" (Official Music Video) – 3:00
2. "Mall" (Live at "Festivali i Këngës 56") – 4:34
3. "DVD extras"

== Release history ==
| Region | Date | Format(s) | Label | Ref. |
|---|---|---|---|---|
| Various | 6 April 2018 | Digital download; streaming | RTSH; Universal | |
| Various | 17 April 2018 | CD; DVD | RTSH; Universal | |
