= Flaka Krelani =

Kosovar singer (born 1989)

- Born: 28 June 1989 (age 37); Gjakova, SFR Yugoslavia (present-day Kosovo)
- Genres: Rock, alternative, blues
- Occupation: Singer
- Instruments: Vocals
- Years active: 2004–

Flaka Krelani (born 28 June 1989) is a Kosovar singer.

== Music career ==
Krelani started her career at "Ethet", a similar contest to Idol where she reached the final. After the show, she became one of the most popular Albanian rock singers. During the six-year period after Ethet, Flaka participated in various music festivals held in different Albanian territories. She participated in Top Fest, receiving "Best Alternative" in its 4th edition, and "Best Rock" in its eighth edition.

She has tried to represent Albania in Eurovision four times. In 2008, she ranked second, and Top 5 in the two upcoming years. In 2015 she ranked third with her song "S’je Për Mu"

== Discography ==
=== Albums ===
- Xperimental (2016)

=== Singles ===
- A Ka Kuptim - Flaka Krelani
- Am I Good Man - Flaka Krelani
- E Di - Flaka Krelani
- Edhe Sa - Flaka Krelani
- Enderr - Flaka Krelani
- Fire - Flaka Krelani
- Funky Funk - Flaka Krelani
- Hit Me - Flaka Krelani
- Intro Xperimental - Flaka Krelani
- Jan Qu Fjalt E Urta Pesh - Flaka Krelani
- Jeta Kerkon Dashuri - Flaka Krelani & Doruntina Disha
- Krej C'ka Ke S'je - Flaka Krelani
- Le Te Behet çfare Te Doje - Flaka Krelani
- Nata - Flaka Krelani
- Ngrihu Tash - Flaka Krelani
- Nje Bote Tjeter - Flaka Krelani
- Nuk Mundem - Arber Elezi & Flaka Krelani
- Pa Titull - Flaka Krelani
- Për Ty - Erti Hizmo & Flaka Krelani
- Relax - Flaka Krelani
- S'je Për Mu - Flaka Krelani
- Shpirti - Flaka Krelani
- T'Boj me Rock - Flaka Krelani
- Tek Ti Ne Shpirt (Labirinti I Zemres) - Flaka Krelani
- Ti - Flaka Krelani
- Un - Flaka Krelani
- Zjarm - Flaka Krelani
- Frie - Flaka Krelani
- Rebelohem - Flaka Krelani
- Osiris - Flaka Krelani
- Collaboration:
- Troja - Beautiful World (Feat. Flaka Krelani)
- Kengetare Te Ndryshem - Prane Njeri Tjetrit
- Artistet E Gjakoves - Qyteti I Humbur
- Rina Abdyli - Si Bass (Feat. Flaka Krelani & Mc Kresh

== Awards and nominations ==
Festivali i Këngës

| Year | Nominee / work | Award | Result |
|---|---|---|---|
| 2007 | "Jeta kerkon dashuri" | Main Competition | Second |
| 2015 | "S'je per mu" | Main Competition | Third |

Kenga Magjike

| Year | Nominee / work | Award | Result |
|---|---|---|---|
| 2016 | "Rebelohem" | Best Female Vocal | Won |

Top Fest

| Year | Nominee / work | Award | Result |
|---|---|---|---|
| 2007 | "Nje bote tjeter" | Best Alternative | Won |
| 2011 | "Krej C'ka Ke Sje" | Best Rock & Alternative Song | Won |

Netet e Klipit Shqiptare

| Year | Nominee / work | Award | Result |
|---|---|---|---|
| 2015 | "Zjam" | Best Rock Video | Won |

Videofest Awards

| Year | Nominee / work | Award | Result |
|---|---|---|---|
| 2007 | "Nje bote tjeter" | Best Rock Video | Won |
| 2007 | "Nje bote tjeter" | Best Editing | Won |
| 2008 | "T'boj me Rock" | Best Rock Video | Won |

Zhurma Show Awards

| Year | Nominee / work | Award | Result |
|---|---|---|---|
| 2015 | "Am I Good Man" | Best Rock | Nominated |
