= World (Lindita song) =

2017 song by Lindita

Single by Lindita
- Released: 29 March 2017
- Genre: Pop rock
- Length: 2:56
- Label: RTSH; Universal
- Composer(s): Klodian Qafoku
- Lyricist(s): Gerald Xhari; Lindita Halimi
- Producer(s): Andrea Camilletti; Klodian Qafoku; Shpetim Saraci

Lindita singles chronology
| "Cold World" (2015) | "World" (2017) | "Rock Whine" (2017) |

Music video
- "World" on YouTube

Eurovision Song Contest 2017 entry
- Country: Albania
- Artist(s): Lindita
- Language: English
- Composer(s): Klodian Qafoku
- Lyricist(s): Gerald Xhari; Lindita Halimi

Finals performance
- Semi-final result: 14th
- Semi-final points: 76

Entry chronology
- ◄ "Fairytale" (2016)
- "Mall" (2018) ►

"World" is a song by Kosovar singer and songwriter Lindita. It was issued as a single on 29 March 2017 by Radio Televizioni Shqiptar (RTSH) and Universal Music. The song was written by the singer herself together with Gerald Xhari, and composed by Klodian Qafoku. An English-language pop-rock ballad, it is lyrically a manifesto that discuss the challenges within a modern society simultaneously calling for rising up against wars and pleading for peace and love.

The song represented Albania in the Eurovision Song Contest 2017 in Kyiv, Ukraine, after Lindita's victory at the country's pre-selection competition Festivali i Këngës with the song's Albanian-language version "Botë". It ultimately failed to qualify for the grand final also marking the country's seventh non-qualification in the contest. During her minimalistic performance, she was accompanied by four backing vocalists while the LED screens portrayed a variety of imagery.

"World" was positively received by music critics, who praised Lindita's vocals, as well as the song's composition and lyrics. For promotional purposes, the singer performed the song live on multiple Eurovision-related occasions, including in Amsterdam, Madrid and Tel Aviv. An accompanying music video for the song was premiered to the official YouTube channel of the Eurovision Song Contest on 13 March 2017. It prominently features scenes of Lindita singing her song within an alternate dimension.

== Background ==
In 2016, Lindita was announced as one of the twenty-five contestants selected to compete in the 55th edition of Festivali i Këngës, a competition to determine Albania's participant for the Eurovision Song Contest 2017. Following the competition's rules, the lyrics of the participating entries had to be in the Albanian language. Lindita took part with the song "Botë" written by Gerald Xhari and composed by Klodian Qafoku.

For the purpose of the singer's Eurovision Song Contest participation, "Botë" was remastered and translated to "World". The latter song was then rewritten by Lindita herself together with Gerald Xhari, and composed by Klodian Qafoku. It was mixed by Marco Borsatti and further produced by Qafoku alongside Andrea Camilletti and Shpetim Saraci. It was premiered on 13 March 2017, while being digitally released on digital platforms and streaming services on 29 March 2017.

== Composition and critical reception ==
"World" was musically characterised by Sebastian Kettley from Daily Express as an English-language pop-rock song. Chris Zeiher from SBS called it a "Bond-style ballad", while Eurovision.de writer Stefanie Grossmann said, "World" is a spherical power ballad that brings Lindita's powerful voice to the fore". Regarding the song's lyrics, Grossmann said, "the song is about the challenges within a modern society and also calls for rising up against wars and pleading for peace and love". Sebastian Kettley from Daily Express described it as a pop-rock song noting a "powerful" message of spreading love. An editor of The Telegraph concluded, "another Eurovision staple: the what is happening to the world? power ballad". Reviewers from Wiwibloggs were generally positive, praising the singer's vocal delivery, as well as the song's composition and instrumentation, while labelling it as being "organic" and "contemporary".

== Music video and promotion ==
An accompanying music video for "World" premiered on the official YouTube channel of the Eurovision Song Contest on 13 March 2017. Chris Halpin of Wiwibloggs praised Lindita's appearance as well as the music video itself noting the maintenance of "many hidden messages". In an exclusive presentation for San Marino RTV, commentator John Kennedy O'Connor gave a favourably review saying, "This is definitely one of the most beautiful and inspiring videos of this year's previews". For further promotion, Lindita made several appearances throughout Europe to specifically promote the song at various events, including at Amsterdam's Eurovision in Concert, PreParty ES in Madrid and Israel Calling in Tel Aviv.

== At Eurovision ==
=== Festivali i Këngës ===
The national broadcaster of Albania, Radio Televizioni Shqiptar (RTSH), organised the 55th edition of Festivali i Këngës to select the country's entrant for the Eurovision Song Contest 2017. The contest took place in December 2017, for which 24 songs had been internally shortlisted by a jury panel made up of music professionals. Subsequently, after the grand final, Lindita and her Albanian-language song "Botë" were chosen to represent Albania in the contest, after the votes of an expert jury panel and the internet were combined, resulting in 85 total points.

=== Kyiv ===
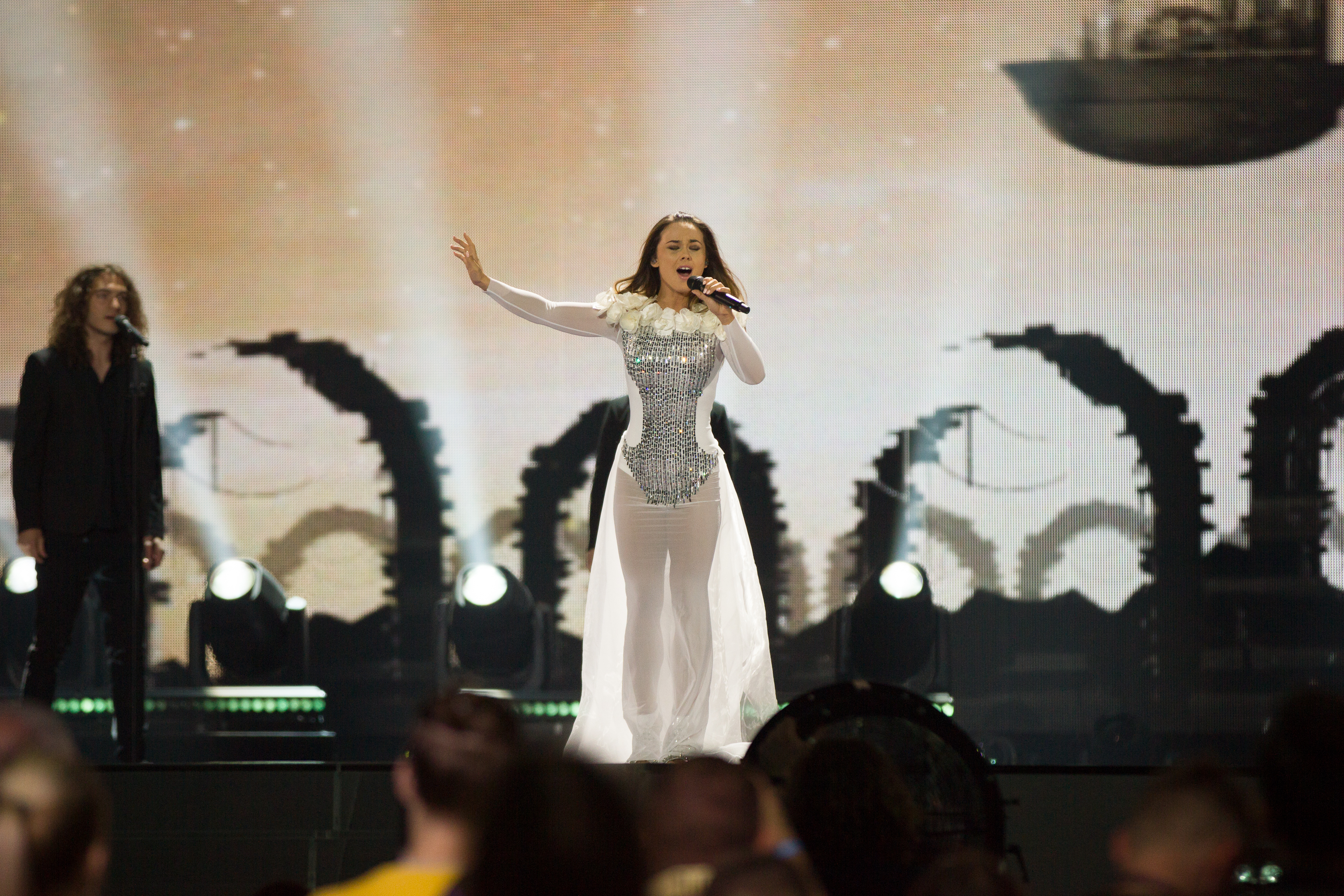
Lindita performing during a rehearsal prior the first semi-final in Kyiv.

The 62nd edition of the Eurovision Song Contest took place in Kyiv, Ukraine, and consisted of two semi-finals held on 9 and 11 May, and the grand final on 13 May 2017. According to the Eurovision rules, each participating country, except the host country and the "Big Five" including France, Germany, Italy, Spain and the United Kingdom, were required to qualify from one of two semi-finals to compete for the grand final, although, the top ten countries from the respective semi-final progress to the grand final. On 31 January 2017, it was announced that "World" would be performed in the first half of the first semi-final of the contest. During the live show, Albania performed fourth following Australia and preceding Belgium. The country eventually failed to qualify for the grand final in fourteenth place with 38 points ranking fourteenth by the jury's 38 points and twelfth by the televote of 38 points.

The well-received performance of Lindita begins with her singing the song in front of dark green lights while wearing a white costume which symbolises "peace" and "elegance". Following the first refrain, a clock appears on the LED screens and fills the entire circular stage floor, ticking to the song. Later in the show, the screens shows sailing spaceships and numerous chandeliers flowing on the stage.

== Personnel ==
Credits adapted from Tidal.

- Lindita – performing, vocals
- Klodian Qafoku – composing, producing
- Shpetim Saraci – producing
- Andrea Camilletti – producing
- Gerald Xhari – songwriting
- Marco Borsatti – mixing

== Track listing ==
- Digital download
1. "World" – 2:56

== Release history ==
| Region | Date | Format | Label | Ref. |
|---|---|---|---|---|
| Various | 29 March 2017 | Digital download; streaming | RTSH; Universal | |
