= Endri Sina =

Albanian composer and arranger

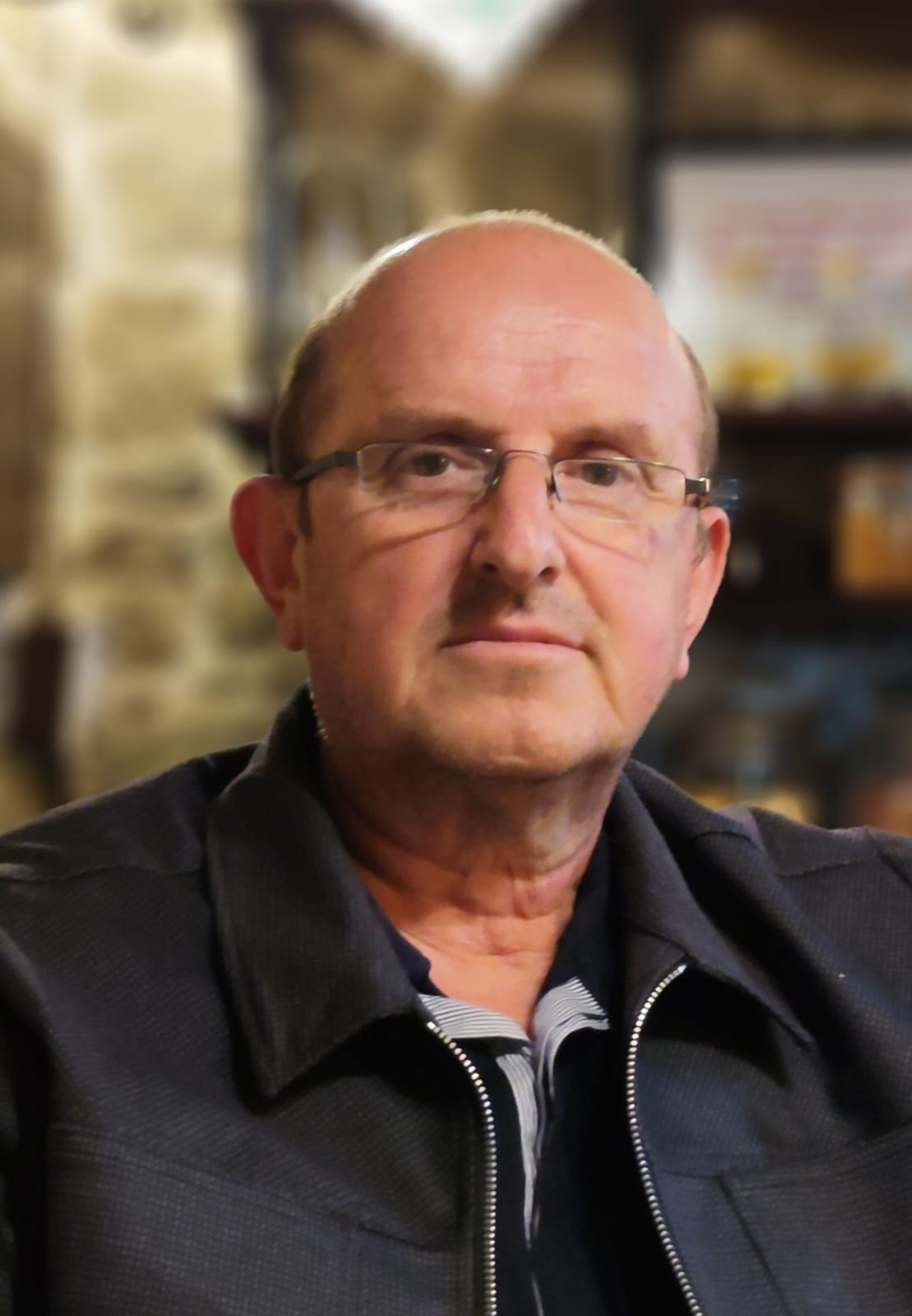
- Sina in 2023
- Born: Endri Engjëll Sina; 18 July 1967 (age 59); Tirana, Albania
- Education: University of Arts, Tirana
- Occupations: Composer; arranger; academic
- Employer: University of Arts, Tirana
- Known for: Chamber music; theatre music; film scores; orchestration
- Notable work: Gjoleka, djali i Abazit; Bolero në vilën e pleqve; Sinfonietta “PALADEA”; Official hymn of the University of Arts
- Spouse: Holta Sina

Endri Engjëll Sina (born 18 July 1967) is an Albanian composer, arranger and academic. His work includes chamber music, orchestral and vocal compositions, stage music, film scores and arrangements for concert performance.

Sina is a professor at the University of Arts, Tirana, where he is listed among the members of the university's Academic Senate. In addition to concert music, he has written music for Albanian theatre and cinema, including the feature films Gjoleka, djali i Abazit and Bolero në vilën e pleqve.

== Early life and education ==
Sina studied composition at the Faculty of Music of the University of Arts, Tirana, then known as the Academy of Arts, and graduated in 1989. He studied with composer Thoma Gaqi, whose composition class has been credited with forming several later Albanian composers, including Sina.

After graduation, Sina joined the same institution as a lecturer in harmony. He later became a professor at the University of Arts.

== Academic career ==
Sina has taught at the Faculty of Music of the University of Arts in Tirana, where his academic work has been connected with harmony, composition and the training of younger musicians. The university lists him as a member of its Academic Senate.

His students have included younger Albanian composers and musicians. The European University of Tirana's profile of Kristi Bello notes that Bello studied composition at the Academy of Arts from 2005 to 2009 in the class of Prof. Assoc. Endri Sina.

In 2025, Sina was listed by the Academy of Sciences of Albania among the participants of the national scientific conference "Muzika shqiptare si krijimtari, interpretim, muzikologji dhe edukim artistik" ("Albanian Music as Creation, Interpretation, Musicology and Artistic Education"), held in Tirana on 30 October 2025.

In 2026, the University of Arts reported that its official hymn, with music by Sina and text by Eriona Rushiti, was performed by the student choir of the Faculty of Music at the university's 60th anniversary conference.

== Music ==
Reference works on Albanian music and chamber music include Sina among Albanian composers. His output includes works for chamber ensembles, orchestra, voice and stage. His compositions and arrangements have been performed in Albanian music events and in concerts outside Albania.

In 2015, works by Sina were included in a concert of Albanian romances at the University of Arts, organised within the International Festival "Ditët e Muzikës së Re".

In 2016, Albania was represented at the Balkan Contemporary Music Festival by works of several Albanian composers, including Sina, Haig Zacharian, Thoma Simaku, Aleksandër Peçi, Dorian Çene, Arbana Fejzo and Ermir Bejo.

In 2017, Sina took part in a Chinese music project involving 16 Eastern European countries, as part of the Cooperation between China and Central and Eastern European Countries, having been selected as one of its participating composers, representing Albania. In a 2018 interview, he stated that he had written two works for traditional Chinese ensembles: one was performed in September 2017 at the inauguration of the Zhejiang Conservatory of Music campus in Hangzhou, and another was performed the following month in Beijing by the Forbidden City Chamber Orchestra. The compositions were written for traditional Chinese instruments and incorporated Albanian and Balkan musical elements. On 31 December 2017, Sina's Dichromatic was included in the Zhejiang Conservatory's Traditional Chinese Music New Year Concert, conducted by Wu Qiang.

In 2025, the Balkan Sextet "Pro Arte" performed a programme in Tirana that included works by Albanian and foreign composers, including Sina.

== Orchestral and chamber works ==
Sina has written orchestral and chamber works alongside his theatre and film music. In 2015, the vocal-symphonic concert "Muzika që flet shqip" at the National Theatre of Opera and Ballet included two works by Sina: Shekulli im for mixed choir and symphony orchestra, and Adagio – Në kujtim të një ëngjëlli.

In 2025, the National Theatre of Opera and Ballet listed Sina's Sinfonietta “PALADEA” as an absolute premiere in a 1 March symphonic concert performed by the institution's orchestra.

A commercial digital release of Sinfonietta “PALADEA” lists four movements: "Pastorale", "Lamento", "Dance" and "Allegro con fuoco", performed by the TKOB Symphonic Orchestra of Tirana and conducted by Dian Tchobanov.

== Arrangements and orchestration ==
Sina has also worked as an arranger and orchestrator for public concerts. The National Theatre of Opera and Ballet credited him with the orchestration of Agim Krajka's "Kënga e Gjyshes" in the gala concert Grand Gala “All love Agim Krajka” – Tirana. The same orchestration was also listed in the later concert Bridges of Musical Tradition 2.

In 2023, Sina was artistic director of Tingujt e Kujtesës ("Sounds of Memory"), a memorial concert dedicated to the 50th anniversary of the Spaç Prison revolt. Most of the musical pieces were arranged by Sina and listed him as the concert's artistic director.

== Theatre music ==
Sina has been especially associated with music for theatre. In a 2023 profile, composer and researcher Blerina Shalari described him as a composer closely connected with the sound world of Albanian theatre and discussed his work for stage productions after 2000. The same profile identified several theatre works associated with Sina's music, including Trupi im i mirë, Galaksia, Equus and Ivanov.

His theatre music has also been recognised at Albanian theatre festivals. In 2025, at the third edition of the nationwide Albanian theatre festival "Moisiu" in Pristina, Sina received the award for best composer for the National Theatre of Albania production Si ta doni, based on Shakespeare's As You Like It.

== Film music ==
Sina has written music for Albanian films and screen productions. The Albanian Central State Film Archive lists him as the composer of Dhimitër Anagnosti's feature film Gjoleka, djali i Abazit. The film, also known internationally as Father and Godfather, is a 100-minute colour feature film directed and written by Anagnosti.

He also composed the music for Spartak Pecani's film Bolero në vilën e pleqve. In 2021, the film was screened at the Prishtina International Film Festival and noted Sina as the composer of the film's music.

== Selected works ==
=== Orchestral and chamber ===
- Sinfonietta “PALADEA” – for string orchestra, harp and percussion; absolute premiere at TKOBAP in 2025
- Shekulli im – for mixed choir and symphony orchestra
- Adagio – Në kujtim të një ëngjëlli
- Dichromatic – for traditional Chinese orchestra; performed at the Zhejiang Conservatory of Music's New Year concert in 2017
- Kush ta fali bukurinë – included in the winning compositions of the 2021 "George Stephanescu" International Composition Competition publication

=== Film and screen ===
- Gjoleka, djali i Abazit – film score
- Bolero në vilën e pleqve – film score

=== Theatre ===
- Trupi im i mirë – theatre music
- Galaksia – theatre music
- Equus – theatre music
- Ivanov – theatre music
- Si ta doni – theatre music; winner of the "Moisiu" festival award for best composer

=== Arrangements and institutional music ===
- "Kënga e Gjyshes" – orchestration for concert performance
- Tingujt e Kujtesës – artistic director and arrangements for memorial concert
- Official hymn of the University of Arts, Tirana – music by Sina, text by Eriona Rushiti
- Albanian romances and vocal works performed in concerts of Albanian art song
