= Albanian iso-polyphony =

Traditional folk singing technique

Iso-Polyphony
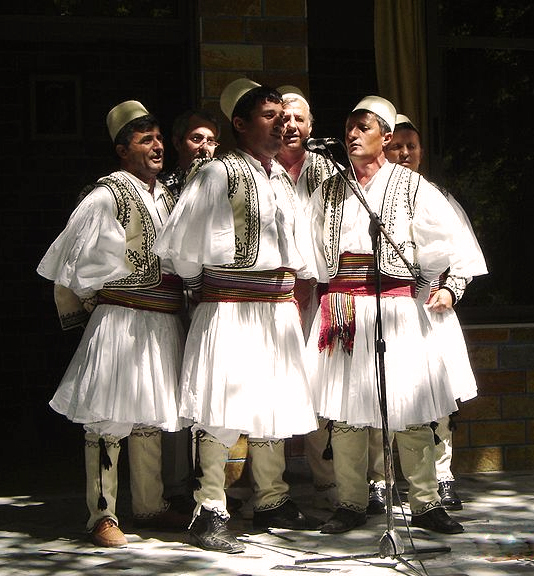
- A traditional male group performing
- Native name: Iso-polifonia
- Stylistic origins: Albanian music
- Typical instruments: Human voice

Albanian folk iso-polyphony
- UNESCO Intangible Cultural Heritage
- Country: Albania
- Reference: 00155
- Region: Europe and North America

Inscription history
- Inscription: 2008 (3rd session)
- List: Representative

Iso-Polyphony (Albanian: Iso-polifonia) is a traditional form of Albanian folk music in which multi-line singing is accompanied by choral drone parts, and which has many regional and formal variations. It is included in UNESCO's intangible cultural heritage list. Albanian Iso-Polyphony is considered to have its roots in the many-voiced vajtim, the southern Albanian traditional lamentation of the dead. The instrumental expression of the Albanian Iso-Polyphony evolved into the Albanian kaba.

All four regions of southern Albania—Lalëria (Myzeqe), Toskëria, Çamëria, and Labëria—have polyphonic song as part of their culture. A related form of polyphonic singing is found in northern Albania, in the area of Peshkopi; Polog, Tetovo, Kičevo and Gostivar in North Macedonia; and Malësia in northern Albania and southern Montenegro.

Labëria is particular well known for multipart singing; songs can have two, three, or four parts. Two-part songs are sung only by women. Three-part songs can be sung by men and women. Four part songs are a Labërian specialty. Research has shown that four-part songs developed after three-part ones, and that they are the most complex form of polyphonic singing.

At Albanian occasions of music or singing, individuals can often be heard calling out loudly, Béni iso! or Béni isa! ("Do a drone!") or the similar Ajde, mbusheni! ("Come on, fill it!").

The Gjirokastër National Folklore Festival, Albania, (Albanian: Festivali Folklorik Kombëtar), has been held every five years in the month of October since 1968, and it typically includes many polyphonic songs.

== Name ==
The term iso (sometimes yso or ysa) is related to the Greek word ίσον (ison) which is a drone in Byzantine church music. Polyphony refers to multiple lines of melody.

The name "iso-polyphony" may have spread from scholastic influence in the later 20th century, while folk singers amongst themselves may use various terms for drone singing including: e mbajnë zë ("they hold the voice"), bëjnë zë ("they make voice"), këngë me iso ("songs with a drone"), zjejnë ("to boil"), mbajnë kaba ("they hold kaba") (where the word kaba is adapted from Turkish and often means a melody in a low register or something heavy), and me të rënkuar meaning "with a moan" or groan.

== Geographic distribution ==
The Albanian polyphonic traditional music is performed in two dialects of Albanian: Tosk and Lab. The Tosk musical dialect comprises the Albanian ethnographic regions of Toskëria, Myzeqeja, and Chamëria, while the Lab musical dialect comprises Labëria.

== Origin ==
Albanian Iso-Polyphony is considered to have its roots in the many-voiced vajtim, the southern Albanian traditional lamentation of the dead.

Many scholars who have studied the Albanian iso-polyphony and in general the polyphonic music of the Balkans consider it an old tradition that dates back to the Thraco-Illyrian era. There is a lack of historical documentation of the Albanian polyphonic traditional music. However, since it is considered the product of oral transmission down many generations, scholars came to their conclusions by analyzing this musical tradition that continues to be performed in modern days. There are found many specific features of the Albanian polyphonic tradition that indicate its ancient origin: the pentatonic modal/tonal structure, which is widely thought by scholars to represent an early beginning to the musical culture of a people; the presence of recitative vocals, because when the melody of the vocals is not developed, the tradition is thought to be in a more primitive phase; the presence of calls and shouts, which indicates a primitive phase of development in the musical culture of a people; the a cappella singing style, which suggests an old age of a musical tradition since it lacks of instrumental accompaniment.

Although the region was under the dominion of the Byzantine Empire for many centuries, the Balkan polyphonic traditional music had a different development than medieval Byzantine music. The Balkan tradition was non-institutionalized and has been continually collectively formed, while the Byzantine music was created by individual composers and was institutionalized. The Balkan tradition has been transmitted orally down the generations, and its performers were common people musically illiterate, while the Byzantine music was widely documented, and has been performed by professionals who were trained and educated. The two musical traditions lived side by side for centuries, therefore they would have had a mutual influence on each other. However, it is thought that the interaction between the Albanian polyphonic traditional music and the Byzantine music has been relatively small.

== Evolution ==
Albanian polyphonic traditional music is thought to have been composed in its beginnings of only two melodic lines: the taker (Albanian: marrës – 1st voice) and the turner (Albanian: kthyes or pritës – 2nd voice). The turner likely played initially a non-specific melodic role, a style that can still be found in the two-voiced polyphonic singing of the women in Gjirokastër. It is thought that over time the turner have gradually become more precisely defined melodically; the tradition of two-voiced (taker and turner) in which the turner plays a clearly defined melodic role is found today among the men of Dukat. Although it is typical in Gjirokastër and Dukat, two voice iso-polyphony can be found in many Albania areas, such as in Korcë, Librazhd, Pogradec, Kolonjë, Fier, Shpat i Sipërm of Elbasan, Myzeqe, Vlorë, Berat, Mallakastër, Gjirokastër, Lunxhëri, as well as in Albanian speaking areas of Zajas, Kičevo and Tetovo. The two voice iso-polyphony can also be found in the Arbëreshë of Calabria. According to scholar Vasil Tole thinking about the two voice polyphony as a first stage of the development of the iso-polyphony is incorrect, because the two voices actually play three voices, so the two voice iso-polyphony is a "hidden" way of a three voice iso-polyphony.

The next melodic line to evolve into Albanian traditional polyphony is thought to have been the drone (Albanian: iso), which seems to have adapted naturally to the two previous melodic lines, giving rise to the three-voiced polyphony. The introduction of the drone was a significant artistic achievement because it brought the diversification and the enrichment of the harmonic interplay between melodic lines. The drone is very common in today's Albanian polyphonic tradition, and it is rare to find varieties without it nowadays. Although currently the three voice iso-polyphony can be found in mixed gender musical groups, traditionally it was sung only by men. The areas where the three voice polyphony is typical are those of Skrapar, Gramsh, Devoll, Gjirokastër, Kolonjë, Sarandë, and Vlorë.

The last melodic line to evolve into Albanian traditional polyphony was the launcher (Albanian: hedhësi – 3rd voice), which gave rise to the four-voiced polyphony. The introduction of the launcher marked an increasing artistic sophistication; however, it did not essentially change the vocal harmony and interplay. Being completely absent in Toskëria, Myzeqeja, and Chamëria, the four-voiced polyphony exists only in Labëria, where it is found along with the more common three-voiced style. The consolidation of the four voice method iso-polyphony is due to Neço Muko in his recordings in the 1920s–1930s.

The instrumental expression of the Albanian Iso-Polyphony evolved into the Albanian kaba.

== Pleqërishte ==
Pleqërishte is a genre of Albanian folk iso-polyphony sung by men in Labëria and is principally identified with the city of Gjirokastër and its environs. The genre is characterized by a slow tempo, low pitch and small range.

Pleqërishte means both "of old men" and "of the old time" in reference to the mode of singing and the lyrical themes of part of their songs respectively. In relation to these subjects pleqërishte songs are also called lashtërishte ("of the ancient time"), a term used exclusively in Gjirokastër. These specific topics have largely fallen into public disuse over the years but remain thematically notable.

Songs of the genre adhere to a slow tempo and low pitch with little vocal variation as opposed to genres such as djemurishte ("of young men") in particular. As all fourth-part genres they feature a third soloist (hedhës). While in other four-part genres the hedhës mainly assumes the role of secondary drone a minor third above the keynote, in pleqërishte the hedhës relieves the first soloist (marrës) and allows him to take a breathing break. Each rendition begins with the singing of the first lines by the marrës and the introduction of the second soloist (kthyes) and finally the hedhës. After the hedhës, the marrës's lyrics are repeated by the drone group in various forms and manners.

Pleqërishte songs are exemplified in the repertory of the folk group Pleqtë e Gjirokastrës sometimes regarded as the "last representative" of the genre. One of the best-known songs of the genre and most notable renditions of the group is Doli shkurti, hyri marsi, which details a battle between Çerçiz Topulli and Ottoman troops in 1908 in the village of Mashkullorë near Gjirokastër.

== See also ==
- Vajtim
- Ison (music)
- List of Intangible Cultural Heritage elements in Albania
- List of World Heritage Sites in Albania

== Literature ==
- Tole, Vasil (2014), Enciklopedia e iso-polifonisë popullore shqiptare (in Albanian)

=== Bibliography ===
- Shetuni, Spiro J. (2011). Albanian Traditional Music: An Introduction, with Sheet Music and Lyrics for 48 Songs. McFarland. ISBN 978-0-7864-8630-4.
- Stipčević, Aleksandar (1989). Iliri: povijest, život, kultura [The Illyrians: history and culture] (in Croatian). Školska knjiga. ISBN 9788603991062.
- Tole, Vasil S. (2022). "Kabaja With Saze as a Ballad Without Words" (PDF). Studia Albanica (2): 43–50. ISSN 0585-5047.
