= Rock music in Albania =

Albanian rock describes music in Albania, Kosovo, North Macedonia and other Albanian-inhabited areas closely related to western rock. It has a wide variety of subgenres like pop rock, alternative rock, hard rock and metal.

== History ==
=== 1960s ===
American and British influence marked Albanian rock music in its first steps. The first known Albanian rock band was called Blue Star. They appeared in 1964 in Prishtinë and were later renamed as Modestët (The Modests).

=== 1970s ===
In the beginning of the 1970s, the rock scene present in Mitrovicë, Kosovo (then Yugoslavia) was made of Albanian and Serbian bands. Some of these bands, like MAK had both Albanian and Serbian musicians. Another bi-ethnic band was FAN also based in Mitrovicë. In 1978 the famous guitarist and composer Nexhat Macula formed one of the best Albanian rock bands of all time, called "TNT" in Mitrovica. Between 1978 and 2006 the band published ten albums.

=== 1980s ===
Prishtinë was the most important city for Albanian rock music during the 1980s. In the mainstream circles Gjurmët (founded 1981) were among favourites. Their combination of rock with "muzikë qytetare" laid the foundation of Albanian rock. Other known bands that formed during this period were Ilirët, 403, Telex, Seleksioni 039, Minatori and Menkis.

Underground rock leaned more towards punk music. The most notable underground rock/punk band of Pristina in the 1980s was Lindja with its lead musician Luan Osmani (lead guitar).

In Albania, the first rock concert was organised by Aleksandër Gjoka in 1989.

In North Macedonia the main Albanian rock/punk band is considered to be Blla Blla Blla who were founded in 1989. Their influence can be seen not only in Albanian but also in Macedonian rock music. Another Albanian band from North Macedonia is Shekulli i Dreqit (The Devil's Century), who are a metal band from Struga.

=== 1990s ===
In Albania, the most prominent rock bands and individuals only appeared after 1990. Before that period, rock music was prohibited. Although youth groups found ways to listen it through clandestine channels.

The first rock band in Albania was Megaherz, which was founded by guitarist Bledar Sejko. After the fall of communism, he went on to form Thunder Way with Elton Deda. They were a Power/Speed Metal band who recorded their first rock album in Albania called "The Order Executors", on cassette. Meanwhile, Bojken Lako was experimenting rock with his first band, The Fishhook, who released one album on cassette.

Some notable rock bands include Akullthyesit (Icebreakers) from Elbasan (first rock album Lindja e Ujkut), Meteor from Durrës, Djemtë e Detit, Albatros, Grupi X, and singers like Gjergj Jorgaqi (who sang for a short while for Thunderway), Redon Makashi and many others.

Guttersnipe was a short-lived punk band from Tirana in the early 1990s (one song was released on the compilation Last Call for the Lost Scenes vol.1 7" vinyl on Tian An Men 89 Records in France). The guitarist, Eduard Dashi, went on to play as a session musician, while the vocalist, Klodi Agostini emigrated to Denmark.

A very popular and important band which remains solid until the present day, is CROSSBONES. Formed in the mid-1990s, the band reached a word-of-mouth reputation that culminated in August 1997 when they released their first and only official album to date. This was called Days of Rage. It was largely influenced by the turbulent times in Albania at the time and was the first ever album to be released and distributed in CD format in Albania. CROSSBONES have participated in countless live performances, both in Albania and abroad, such as in Skopje 1999 and Thessaloniki 2015. CROSSBONES is among the only Albanian bands from the 1990s that carried on producing music, despite numerous changes in their lineup. The original members that recorded the Days of Rage album and many other successful songs that have recently been included in a ten-song compilation album called Toxic Waste (2015), are: Olsi Ballta (vocals), Klod Shehu (guitars), Alban Male (drums, keyboards) and Arbi Xhelo (producer, guitarist) with Red Hasa and Fatjon Gjashta (bass). Other collaborators include Eduard Dashi, Andi Haxhihyseni, Gjergj Lena, Pol Flloko. Olsi Ballta and Klod Shehu remain the only long-lasting original members. They were joined by drummer Theo Napoloni in 2010 and guitarist Ben Turku in 2014, yielding a three-song single called "Alive" (2015). The band's distinctive style with powerful guitar riffs and vocals has influenced many following musicians and created many fans during their near 20 years of activity.

The beginning of the 1990s introduced other rock bands and individuals that played in Kosovo like Troja, Dardan Shkreli, Blla Blla Blla and Elita 5 (from North Macedonia).

During parallel governance (1989–1999) and after the 1999 war in Kosovo several new bands emerged. Among the most famous are Diadema, KEK ("Kreativ e jo Komercial" = Creative and not commercial), 7me7, The Hithat, Cute Babulja, Por-no, Gre3n, Retrovizorja.

=== 2000s ===
Qelbanix were the first progressive band in Albania and in 2008 they released their first and last album "Infinit Relativ" as a double CD. In this album there is a piece of artwork for every song made by Qelbanix. The alternative band Linda në Botën e Çudirave was created in 2009 with lead singer and guitarist Linda Rukaj. Linda went on to release her single acoustic album "Jam" (I am) in 2011 which was written and composed by her. She was the first female artist in Albania to be a singer/songwriter and guitarist.

After 2004 many alternative rock bands appeared, forming a new wave. Many bands formed, dissolved and then reformed. This included Bands like Votra, Gillespie, The Bloody Foreigners, and Gre3n (who ceased existing in 2008). It also includes the Glasses, the Dizzies (with some band members of Gillespie) and the Freelancers with most of them debuting in 2009.

During this decade in Albania there were many alternative and rock bands such as Permit of Stay, Germs, Ora 3, The Room, The S Forest.

== Notable bands ==
=== Pop punk/alternative/progressive rock ===
- Elita 5
- Gjurmët

=== Hard rock/metal ===
- Eugent Bushpepa
- Troja

== See also ==
- Albanian music
- Music of Kosovo
- Rock music in Kosovo
