= Iso-Polifonia =

Newspaper in Albania

- Type: monthly
- Owner: National Music Council of Albania
- Founder: National Music Council of Albania
- Publisher: National Music Council of Albania
- Editor-in-chief: Ramadan Sokoli; Vasil Tole
- Editor: Engjëll Serjani
- Staff writers: Arian Avrazi, Ilir Dhuri, Lefter Cipa, Muhamet Tartari, Sejmen Gjokoli, Maksi Kulo, Thanas Dino, Shkëlqim Hajno, Shkëlqim Guçe
- Language: Albanian
- Sister newspapers: Festival

Iso-Polifonia is a newspaper published in Albania. The newspaper specializes on articles regarding Albanian polyphonic music.
