= NGOM Fest =

NGOM Fest is a music festival established in Prizren, Kosovo. The word "Ngom" is written in Gheg Albanian dialect and it means "Listen to me" whereas the word "Fest" represents the abbreviation of the word "Festival". This Festival originates from a group of young and creative people who are active in the social life of Prizren and Kosovo. The first edition of the festival was held in June 2011 and due to its major success, the activists were more committed in organizing this event. The main objectives of this festival are to promote new bands and artists, build a new perspective for music festivals in Kosovo, and to connect different ethnic groups in Kosovo and in the region.

== History ==
The first edition of the festival took place on June 24, 2011. The success that this festival had in its first year had set a solid base for the future editions. This achievement helped promote cultural inheritance including the sightseeing's of Prizren, qualitative music and aided to raise awareness of environmental issues. At the same time, numerous events concerning different social and cultural issues were held during the course of three days of this festival. The main focus was to address problems that preoccupy the youth and the society in general. During the first edition, this festival was awarded by the Municipality of Prizren with the prize “The Most Massive Event of the Year 2011".

The second edition of the festival took place on June 22, 2012. It lasted three days and had six stages. These stages included "Shatervan" stage, "Parkingu" stage, "Marash" stage, "Ngom Cafe" stage, "Promo" Stage and "Classical Music" stage. The activities that were held during the duration of NGOM Fest included Photography exhibition, Workshop for Recycling, Workshop Drums Clinic, Disc Collections - The Old time Music, The city of bicycles, Exhibition with recycled objects, Cleaning the city and planting seeds, NGOM Caffe, NGOM Shop and NGOM Camp. During the second edition, this festival was awarded by the Municipality of Prizren with the prize "The Event of the Year".

The third edition of NGOM Fest took place in Prizren during a course of three days, from 5 to 7 July 2013. The main focus of 2013’s NGOM Fest edition was electronic music such as drum and bass, dubstep, progressive techno, trip hop, break and rock genres such as heavy metal and punk rock. More than 30 music bands performed in this edition, among them the Turkish band Baba Zula, known for combining traditional Turkish instruments with electronic and reggae instruments. Other artists who performed in NGOM Fest include, Lenzman, a Dutch DJ and producer performed drum and bass music and the Kosovar rock band Troja.

== The Festival ==
The opening ceremony of the festival starts at 19:00. During this show, secondary school pupils from Kosovo and students of the “Academy of Music in Prishtina” performed classical music. After 20:00 the music starts at the stage in “Marash” and also in the stage of “Shadërvan.” The music continues until the last day at noon. Another scene that is part of NGOM Fest is the‘Promo Scene’ which is designed to promote new musical bands. Thirty bands from Kosova and Albania applied to perform, however only 10 bands were accepted, amongst them, three bands will be selected to record a song in a studio. This activity aims to promote and support the early careers of these new bands. Eighty volunteers participate in the organization of this festival, by turning Prizren into a city of music and art for three days in a row. The camp in Prizren is located in the center of the city, near the Bistrica. This camp accommodates visitors from all over the countries and houses them at the lowest price.

Besides the music performances, this festival is known for recreational spots, including the Ngom Shop. Another interesting event which takes place during these three days is the exhibition that presents the most beautiful parts of the city and its architecture. This exhibition is placed in Hamam. The food is another exciting part of this musical festival since it represents the traditional cuisine of Prizren and the Albanian culture in general.

== Bands and artists ==
Music in NGOM Fest features a wide variety of genres including classical music, rock, alternative, pop and electronic music. Separate and different-themed stages were set up for each music genre. Notable performing bands and artists included: Jericho, Dark Angel, Son of Beat & Japan (from Serbia), Bojken Lako (Albania), Jim Rivers (Ukraine), Conquering Lion (Macedonia), Filip Motovunski (Croatia), Stefan Goldmann, Quantized Music (Greece), Gillespie, Alley Sin (Bulgaria), Triko, Troja, Peni Trio, Jimmy Hagan, Pink Metal, Owlie and many more.
