= Vajtim and Gjëmë =

Albanian dirge or lamentation of the dead

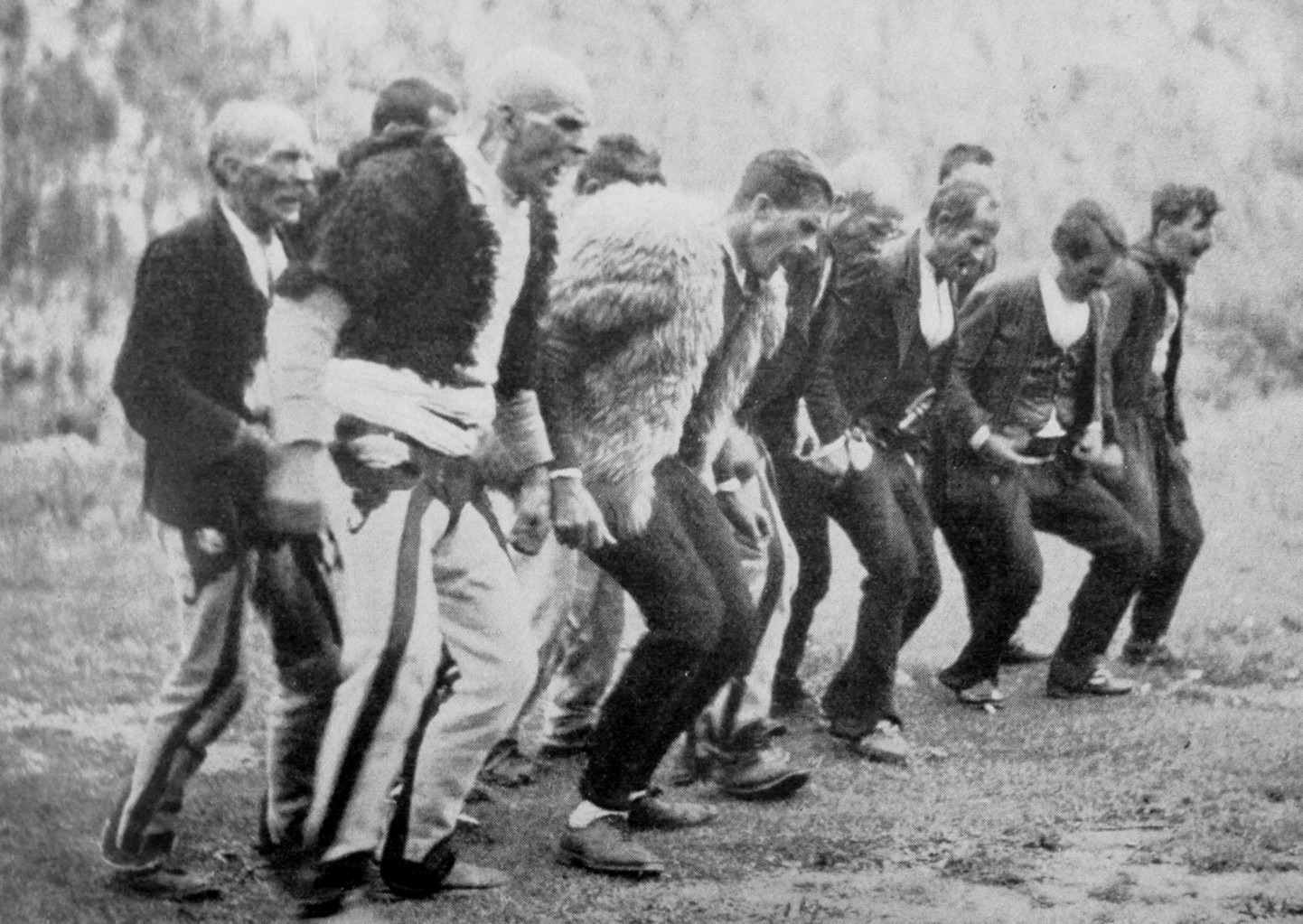
Practicing of gjâmë by the men of Theth (Shala) in the funeral of Ujk Vuksani, 1937

Vajtim and Gjëmë (Gjâmë in the Gheg Albanian) is the dirge or lamentation of the dead in the Albanian custom, by a woman or a group of women for the vajtim, and a group of men for the gjëmë. It has been regulated by the Albanian traditional customary law.

Traditional lamentations have now almost become extinct both in the Islamic and Christian Albanian population, except in some parts of Northern Albania and Kosovo as well as in parts of North Macedonia such as Zajas and Upper Reka, where they exist in a very diminished form. The earliest figurative representations of this practice in traditional Albanian-inhabited regions appear on Dardanian funerary stelae of classical antiquity.

The many-voiced vajtim gave rise to the Albanian Iso-Polyphony and its instrumental expression, which evolved into the Albanian Kaba.

== Northern Albania ==
In northern Albania Vajtim is performed by women "singing in verse the praises of the deceased, with a heart-breaking and moving voice". Women stop their lamentation of the dead and move away from the place they occupy next to the dead when the men start the gjâmë.

Gjâma e Burrave (English: Men's Lament) is a death rite performed only by men and for men only, in Albania, exclusively in the highlands of Dukagjin, Gjakovë and Iballë, Pukë. To perform this rite, a quorum of ten or more men is needed. During the ritual, the men strike their chests and scratch their faces, repeating: O i mjeri unë për ty o biri/nipi/miku jem, (Oh poor me, o my son/nephew/friend), depending on the deceased. Gjâma served the unique purpose of expressing one's grief, but at the same time, to spread the bad news in adjacent regions for others to come and visit the deceased's family. The practice was strictly forbidden during the Communist regime. It was revived after 1990. The practice of the Gjâma is connected to the death of Skanderbeg in 1468. The assumption of the connection between the Gjâma and Skanderbeg's death is based on Marin Barleti's remarks that Lekë Dukagjini had pulled out his hair and his beard as a sign of deep sorrow for his leader's death. The tradition has survived in the Malësia region.

Albanian Catholics practiced the Gjâma more often than Albanian Muslims in the Malësia region. According to the Muslim faith, crying for the dead is prohibited to men. Today Albanian Catholics of Montenegro no longer perform the Gjâma and hire instead professional mourners called Gjâmatarë, from Northern Albania.

The vajtim is well known in the Albanian mythology and epic poetry. One of the most beautiful parts of the Kreshniks' cycle is Vajtimi i Ajkunës, (English: Ajkuna's Lament).

== Southern Albania ==
In Southern Albania a woman usually sings poetic verses and a choir behind her takes up the refrain. In Southern Albania only women participate in the Vajtim, whereas in Northern Albania men also can take part. The song will ask the deceased to get up from the dead because all he owned and all that was dear to him is calling for him/her to be back in life. In the past professional mourners were hired to perform a good vajtim by the wealthy families. The Turkish traveller Evliya Çelebi, visited Gjirokastër, Southern Albania, then part of the Ottoman Empire in 1670, and reported the following account from the city:

The people of Gjirokastra mourn their dead relatives for forty or fifty, indeed up to eighty years. Every Sunday all the relatives of the dead person gather in a jerry-built house, paying professional mourners who weep and wail and keen and lament, raising a great hue and cry. No one can stand to be in town on Sunday because of all the noise and uproar. I dubbed Gjirokastra the city of wailing. It is a great wonder how the professional mourners manage to weep and wail with such feeling - more than for their own relatives - for someone who has been dead a hundred years and to whom they are not even related. And how they lament! It is only when they are exhausted with hunger that they desist.

A particular type of the Vajtim is E qara me ligje (English: Weeping with Lamentations), which is a subgenre of iso-polyphonic mourning. This is mainly encountered in Labëria.

The exclamation used in the songs is a prolonged Oi-oi. The term Oirat is used by Albanian composer Aleksandër Peçi in his opera Oirat.

== See also ==
- Albanian paganism
- Albanian folklore
- Music of Albania

== Bibliography ==
- Genesin, Monica (2020). "The Roles of Women in the Lexicon of the Albanian "code of Skanderbeg" (Kanuni i Skanderbegut)". Studies in Logic, Grammar and Rhetoric. 65 (78): 43–56. doi:10.2478/slgr-2020-0045. hdl:11587/451953. ISSN 0860-150X.
- Joseph, Brian D.; Dedvukaj, Lindon (2024). "Turning night into day: Milieu and semantic change in Albanian". Proceedings of the Linguistic Society of America. 9 (1). Linguistic Society of America: 5681. doi:10.3765/plsa.v9i1.5681.
- Tole, Vasil S. (2022). "Kabaja With Saze as a Ballad Without Words" (PDF). Studia Albanica (2): 43–50. ISSN 0585-5047.
