= Shahindere Bërlajolli =

Singer

- Born: 7 August 1946; Peć, PR Serbia, FPR Yugoslavia
- Died: 3 May 2020 (aged 73); Gostivar, North Macedonia

Shahindere Bërlajolli (7 August 1946 – 3 May 2020) was a singer of Albanian popular music born in Kosovo.

== Biography ==
Born and raised in Peja, she went there for primary and secondary school and studied education. She came from a prominent local family, including her businessman father Mustafë Bërlajolli and her philanthropist mother Igballe. She was at the time the most prominent artist to come from her town.

In 1959, at the age of 13, she appeared at a regional music festival called Mikrofoni është juaji ("The Microphone Is Yours"). She won the national Akordet e Kosovës prize five times and had hits such as "Në zabel të erdha,“ “Miriban," “Kush ma i pari bani," “Gajdexhiu," “O bylbyl me pika-pika," and "Hajde dalim moj goce." She recorded 280 songs in total, mostly at Radio Television of Kosovo.

== Personal life ==
The Bërlajolli family house is a registered monument of cultural heritage.
