= Last Expedition =

- Origin: Skopje, North Macedonia
- Genre: Alternative rock
- Years active: 1985-present
- Labels: MRTV, Promo Siemens
- Members: Sead Hadžić - Secko; Enis Hadžić - Enko; Dimitar Petrov - Dime; Vlatko Janevski; Adi Imeri
- Past members: Jovica Gjozinski; Ognen Mangarovski; Idriz Ameti

Last Expedition is a Macedonian alternative rock band, formed in 1985/1986 by brothers Sead and Enis Hadžić.

== History ==
The band was formed in 1985/1986 in the Đorče Petrov municipality of Skopje, with Dimitar Petrov on drums, Enis Hadžić on bass, Sead Hadžić on guitar and Idriz Ameti on vocals. Their first recorded song, "Maršira propasta" (The March of Destruction) appeared on the compilation Demoskop 1 in 1990, with Ameti on vocals. Around this time, he left the band to focus on his Albanian-language project Blla Blla Blla and Enis Hadžić took over as vocalist. In 1991, they won in the annual MRTV Pop Rock Fest and appeared on the official compilation the following year with the track "Daleku" (Far Away), which was rerecorded at the end of that year and appeared on the album Intro in 1993.

In 1994, they signed to MRTV and recorded their second album Izgubeni likovi, which was released that year. In 1997, they released BoX, their final release with original material until 2019, on the Promo Siemens label. In 2001, they released their final release to date, Live A1.

The band performed on concerts in 2004 and 2012.

The group is still active. They released a new song named "Hey Ho" in 2019

== Discography ==
- Intro (1993)
- Izgubeni likovi (1994)
- BoX (1997)
- Live A1 (2001)
