= Music of Kosovo =

Music of Kosovo is music that originates from Kosovo, a country in the Balkans. Kosovo's population is mainly Kosovo Albanians, also known as Kosovars, and there are various minority ethnic groups as well. Kosovan music is closely related to that of neighbouring Albania, as well as to that of countries in the former Yugoslavia.

Throughout its history, Kosovan music has played an important cultural role and also a significant part of the Kosovan national identity, drawing its artistic basis from the ancient and traditional folk music (with distinctive instrumentation of Albania), rhapsody, and classical music. In recent times, Kosovo has seen the rise of popular music.

Popular music dominates the Kosovan music market, although classical music and folk music remain vibrant. Kosovan musicians have reconstructed traditions that were suppressed while the country was under Yugoslav rule.

Mainstream music in Kosovo is based on Western trends, and popular genres include pop, rock, hip hop, electronic, and jazz.

== Folk music ==
In the past, epic poetry in Kosovo and northern Albania was sung on a lahuta (a one-string fiddle) and then a more tuneful çiftelia was used which has two strings-one for the melody and one for drone. Cultural anthropology researches revealed the antiquity of this tradition and how was it developed in parallel with other traditional music in the Balkans, while various archaeologists discovered finds dating back to the 5th Century B.C. such as stone paintings depicting musicians with instruments, notably the portrait of "Pani" holding an aerophone similar to flute.

== Traditional music ==
=== Kosovo Albanian music ===
It is characterized by use of çiftelia (an authentic Albanian instrument), mandolin, mandola and percussion. The most notable Albanian rock bands are: Gjurmët, Asgjë Sikur Dielli - Jazz Drummer, Ilir Bajri is a notable jazz and electronic musician.

Ledri Vula, Rita Ora, Era Istrefi, Dua Lipa, Faton Flow Loshi, Regard, Dhurata Dora, Nora Istrefi, Majk (rapper), Genta Ismajli, Rona Nishliu, Vedat Ademi and Adelina Ismajli are some of the most popular commercial singers in Kosovo today.

Tallava is a minority music genre from Kosovo, also popular in Albania and the Republic of North Macedonia, in the Albanian-speaking communities. Having originated in the Roma community in Kosovo in the 1990s, it is foreign-sounding, and perceived of as low-status. Nevertheless, it is becoming increasingly popular in Albania and North Macedonia. It is identified as part of the wider Pop-folk genre of the Southeastern Europe, which includes Chalga from Bulgaria, Skiladiko from Greece, Manele from Romania and Turbo-folk from Serbia.

=== Kosovo Serb music ===
Serbian music in Kosovo today represents a minority group and is a mixture of traditional music (which is part of the wider Balkan tradition) with its own distinctive sound and various Turkish influences. Some of Serbian traditional dance kolo originated from Kosovo. Serb songs from Kosovo were an inspiration for 12th song wreath (sr. Руковет) by composer Stevan Mokranjac, who is often called “father of Serbian music”. Most of Serbian music from Kosovo was dominated by church music, with its own share of sung epic poetry. Oral epic poetry and folk songs cultivated the Kosovo Myth. Many epic poems are about events related to the Battle of Kosovo, which is important to Serbian history, tradition and national identity. Serbian national instrument Gusle was also used by their minority in Kosovo.

Jordan Nikolić, Viktorija, Sejo Kalač, Đani, Jana, Tina Ivanović, Slađa Delibašić, Rasta, Nevena Božović are some of the most popular Kosovo Serb commercial singers.

== Rock music ==
While rock music in Kosovo has always been Western oriented, Yugoslavian influence became also evident to a minor extent but it was short-lived. One of the first popular Albanian rock bands was called Blue Star which formed in 1964 in Pristina and later it was renamed to Modestët. In the beginning of the 1970s, the rock music scene in Mitrovica, Kosovo (then Yugoslavia) comprised both Albanian and Serbian bands, though each had their own separate audience and performed in their own languages. However, there was a band called MAK which had both Albanian and Serbian musicians, and another bi-ethnic band was FAN also based in Mitrovica, but their collaboration was short-lived as well.

Pristina was the most important city for Albanian rock music during the 1980s. In the mainstream circles Gjurmët (founded 1981) were among favorites. Their combination of rock with "muzikë qytetare" laid the foundation of Albanian rock. Other known bands that formed during this period were Ilirët, 403, Telex, Seleksioni 039, Minatori and Menkis. On the other hand, underground music was more leaning towards punk. The most notable underground rock/punk band of Pristina in the 1980s was Lindja with its lead musician Luan Osmani (lead guitar). The beginning of the 1990s introduced other rock bands and individuals that played mainly in Kosovo like Troja, Jericho, Dardan Shkreli, Blla blla blla and Elita 5 (from North Macedonia). During the parallel governance (1989–1999) and after the 1999 war in Kosovo, several new Kosovo-Albanian bands emerged, among which the most famous are KEK (Kreativ e jo Komercial – English: creative and not commercial), Troja, 7me7, The Hithat, Cute Babulja, Por-no, Gre3n, Retrovizorja. After the war in 1999, metal bands like: Land of Confusion, Frisson, Krieg, Shlem, Diadema, Sotap, emerged to the surface.

After 2004 many alternative rock band appeared forming a new wave. Many bands formed, dissolved than re-formed. Bands like Votra, Gillespie, The Bloody Foreigners, and Gre3n (ceased existing in 2008). Also the Glasses, the Dizzies (with some band members of Gillespie) The Freelancers most of them debuting in 2009.

== Music abroad ==
=== Musicians ===
The contemporary pop stars Dua Lipa and Rita Ora are ethnic Albanians from Pristina and have achieved an international recognition for their music. Also Era Istrefi had an international breakthrough with her song "BonBon", which charted globally, and was featured on 2018 FIFA World Cup anthem "Live It Up". Another widely recognized musicians are de:Ardita Statovci and Petrit Çeku, both winners of prestigious music awards. Gjon's Tears a Swiss singer and songwriter of Kosovar-Albanian descent, who auditioned for the eighth season of the French singing competition The Voice: la plus belle voix and reached the semi-finals, as representing Switzerland at the Eurovision Song Contest 2021, winning the jury vote and coming third in the grand finals.

=== Eurovision ===
SAP Kosovo was represented by RTV Priština at the Jugovizija, the national pre-selection of Yugoslavia, but their entry has never won. Jugovizija 1986 was organised by RTV Priština. Before 2008 Kosovo declaration of independence, Viktorija a singer from Vučitrn represented Yugoslavia as part of Aska in 1982 and Nevena Božović from Mitrovica represented Serbia in the Junior Eurovision Song Contest 2007.

Kosovo's national public service broadcaster, Radio Television of Kosovo (RTK), has attempted to attain European Broadcasting Union (EBU) membership. The broadcaster had applied to enter Kosovo for the Eurovision Song Contest 2009 and Kosovo would have made its Eurovision Song Contest debut in 2011 if it joined the EBU. However, RTK is ineligible to become a full EBU member as it is not part of the International Telecommunication Union due to Kosovo not being a United Nations members state.

From 2013 on, RTK has observer status within the EBU and did participate in the Eurovision Young Dancers 2011. According to the Kosovar newspaper Koha Ditore, a future entry would be selected via a national final called Akordet e Kosovës, a former pop show that had been taken off the air some years ago.

Kosovo Albanian artists have competed at the Festivali i Këngës since the 80s and have represented Albania in several occasions. The Kosovar singer, Rona Nishliu, represented Albania with "Suus" and placed 5th in the grand final of the Eurovision Song Contest 2012, whereas Lindita Halimi represented Albania in 2017 with "World". Additionally, Elhaida Dani's song I'm Alive which represented Albania in the Eurovision Song Contest 2015, was written and produced by Zzap & Chriss, both Kosovo Albanian record producers and songwriters.

Some singers, especially Kosovo Serbs, participate in Serbian national selection organised by RTS. Nevena Božović also represented Serbia as a member of Moje 3 in the Eurovision Song Contest 2013 and as a solo artist in the Eurovision Song Contest 2019.

== See also ==
- Classical music in Kosovo
- Music of Albania
- Albania in the Eurovision Song Contest
- Radio in Kosovo
