= Music of Albania =

The music of Albania (Albanian: Muzika Shqiptare) is associated with the country of Albania and Albanian communities. Music has a long tradition in the country and is known for its regional diversity, from the Ghegs in the North to the Tosks in the South. It is an integral part of the national identity, strongly influenced by the country's long and turbulent history, which forced Albanians to protect their culture from their overlords by living in rural and remote mountains.

Albanian popular music often incorporates the country's folk music. Albanian folk music includes monophonic and polyphonic styles, responses, choral, instrumental and vocal music. Each region has a unique musical tradition that reflects its history, language and culture. Polyphonic singing and song forms are primarily found in South Albania, while in the North they are predominantly monophonic. Albanian iso-polyphony has been declared an UNESCO Intangible Cultural Heritage of Humanity. The Gjirokastër National Folklore Festival, held every five years in Gjirokastër, is an important venue exhibiting traditional Albanian music.

Albanian music extends to ancient Illyria and Ancient Greece, with influences from the Byzantine and Ottoman Empire. It is evident in archeological findings such as arenas, odeons, theatre buildings and amphitheatres, all over Albania. The remains of temples, libraries, sculptures and paintings of ancient dancers, singers and musical instruments, have been found in territories inhabited by the ancient Illyrians and ancient Greeks.

Church singing was performed throughout the early Middle Ages in Albania by choirs or soloists in ecclesiastical centers such as Berat, Durrës and Shkodër. The Middle Ages in Albania included choral music and traditional music. Shën Jan Kukuzeli, a singer, composer and musical innovator of Albanian origin, is one of the earliest known musicians.

Internationally renowned contemporary musicians of Albanian origin from Albania and Albanian diaspora include Action Bronson, Elvana Gjata, Ava Max, Bebe Rexha, Dua Lipa, Era Istrefi, Albert Stanaj, Dafina Zeqiri, Gashi, Ermal Meta, Enca, Elhaida Dani, Noizy, Unikkatil, and Rita Ora. In the field of classical music, several Albanian sopranos and tenors have gained international recognition including Rame Lahaj, Inva Mula, Marie Kraja, Saimir Pirgu and Ermonela Jaho, and the composer Vasil Tole, a member of the Academy of Sciences of Albania. Best voices of Albanian folk music include Vaçe Zela and Nexhmije Pagarusha. Among the most influential and best performers of the Albanian kaba – a folk instrumental expression of the Albanian Iso-Polyphony – are clarinetists Laver Bariu and Remzi Lela, and violinist Ethem Qerimaj.

== Folk music ==
Dialects of the Albanian language

Albanian folk music has a deep history and can be separated into three major stylistic groups: the northern Ghegs, southern Labs and Tosks and with other important urban music areas around Shkodër and Tirana. It reflects the cultural and political history of the Albanian people and geographic position in Southern Europe and the Mediterranean Sea.

The northern and southern traditions are contrasted by the rugged and heroic tone of the north and the relaxed, gentle and exceptionally beautiful form of the south. These disparate styles are unified by the intensity that both performers and listeners bring to their music as a medium for patriotic expression and as a vehicle carrying the narrative of oral history, as well as certain characteristics like the use of metres such as 3/8, 5/8 and 10/8.

Albanian folk songs can be divided into major groups, the heroic epics of the north and the sweetly melodic lullabies, love songs, wedding music, work songs and other kinds of song. The music of various festivals and holidays is also an important part of Albanian folk song, especially those that celebrate Lazarus Day, which inaugurates the springtime. Lullabies and laments are very important kinds of Albanian folk song, and are generally performed by solo women.

=== Northern Albania ===
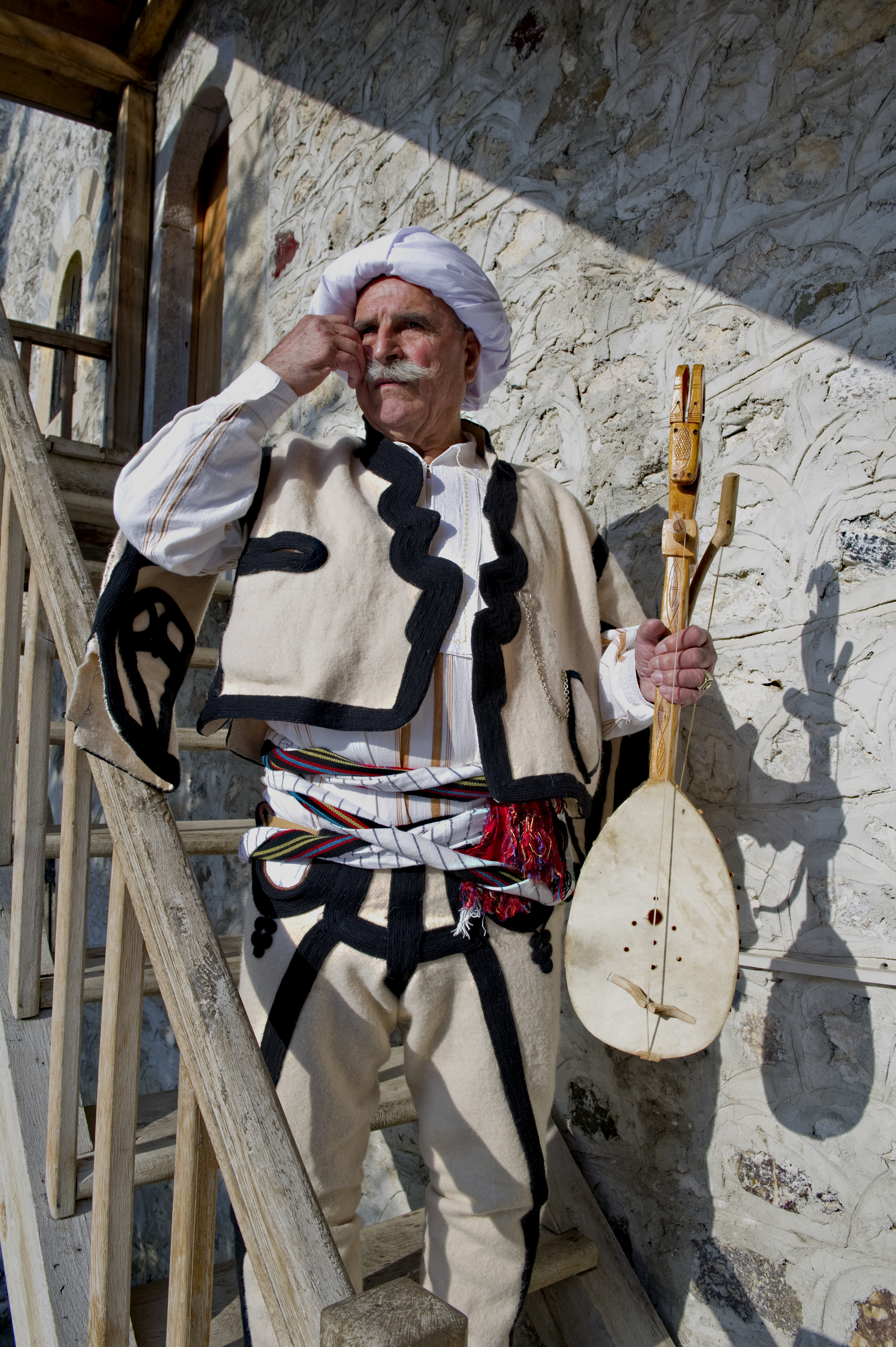
A lahuta player wearing traditional Albanian clothing

The Ghegs from North of the Shkumbini River are known for a distinctive variety of sung epic poetry. The music of the north is particularly monophonic. Many of these are about the struggles of the Albanian people and history, the constant Albanian themes of honor, hospitality, treachery and revenge but also Skanderbeg, a legendary 15th century warrior who led the struggle against the Ottomans. These traditions are a form of oral history for the Ghegs and also preserve and inculcate moral codes and social values, necessary in a society that, until the early 20th century, relied on blood feuds as its primary means of law enforcement.

The most traditional variety of epic poetry is the Albanian Songs of the Frontier Warriors. These epic poems are sung, accompanied by a lahuta. It is rarely performed in modern Albania, but is found in the northern highlands within the Dukagjin highlands and Malësia. Other styles of epics also include the Këngë trimash or kreshnikësh (English: Songs of brave men or frontier warriors), ballads and maje krahis (cries). Major epics include Mujo and Halil and Halil and Hajrije.

Somewhat further south, around Dibër and Kërçovë in Macedonia, the lahuta is not used, replaced by the çifteli, a two-stringed instrument in which one string is used for the drone and one for the melody. Though men are the traditional performers (exception made for the sworn virgins), women have increasingly been taking part in epic balladry.

Along with the def, çifteli and sharki are used in a style of dance and pastoral songs. Homemade wind instruments are traditionally used by shepherds in northern Albania; these include the zumarë, an unusual kind of clarinet. This shepherds' music is "melancholic and contemplative" in tone. The songs called maje-krahi are another important part of North Albanian folk song; these were originally used by mountaineers to communicate over wide distances, but are now seen as songs. Maje-krahi songs require the full range of the voice and are full of "melismatic nuances and falsetto cries".

=== Southern Albania ===
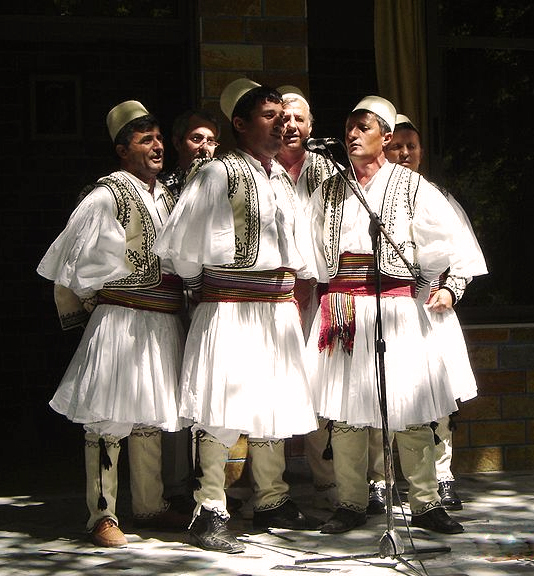
Folk group from Southern Albania

Southern Albanian music is soft and gentle, and polyphonic in nature with similarities to Greek music on polyphonic song of Epirus. Vlorë in the southwest has perhaps the most unusual vocal traditions in the area, with four distinct parts (taker, thrower, turner and drone) that combine to create a complex and emotionally cathartic melody. Author Kim Burton has described the melodies as "decorated with falsetto and vibrato, sometimes interrupted by wild and mournful cries". This polyphonic vocal music is full of power that "stems from the tension between the immense emotional weight it carries, rooted in centuries of pride, poverty and oppression, and the strictly formal, almost ritualistic nature of its structure".

South Albania is also known for funeral laments with a chorus and one to two soloists with overlapping, mournful voices. There is a prominent folk love song tradition in the south, in which performers use free rhythm and consonant harmonies, elaborated with ornamentation and melisma.

The Tosk people are known for ensembles consisting of violins, clarinets, lahutë (a kind of lute) and def. Eli Fara, a popular émigré performer, is from Korçë, but the city of Përmet is the centre for southern musical innovation, producing artists like Remzi Lela and Laver Bariu. Lela is of special note, having founded a musical dynasty that continues with his descendants playing a part in most of the major music institutions in Tirana.

Southern instrumental music includes the sedate kaba, an ensemble-driven by a clarinet or violin alongside accordions and llautës. The Albanian kaba is an improvised and melancholic style with melodies that Kim Burton describes as "both fresh and ancient", "ornamented with swoops, glides and growls of an almost vocal quality", exemplifying the "combination of passion with restraint that is the hallmark of Albanian culture." Among the most influential and best performers of the Albanian kaba are clarinetists Laver Bariu and Remzi Lela, and violinist Ethem Qerimaj.

The ethnic Greek inhabitants of the country's southern parts, have a music very similar to the music of Epirus in Greece.

=== Instrumentation ===
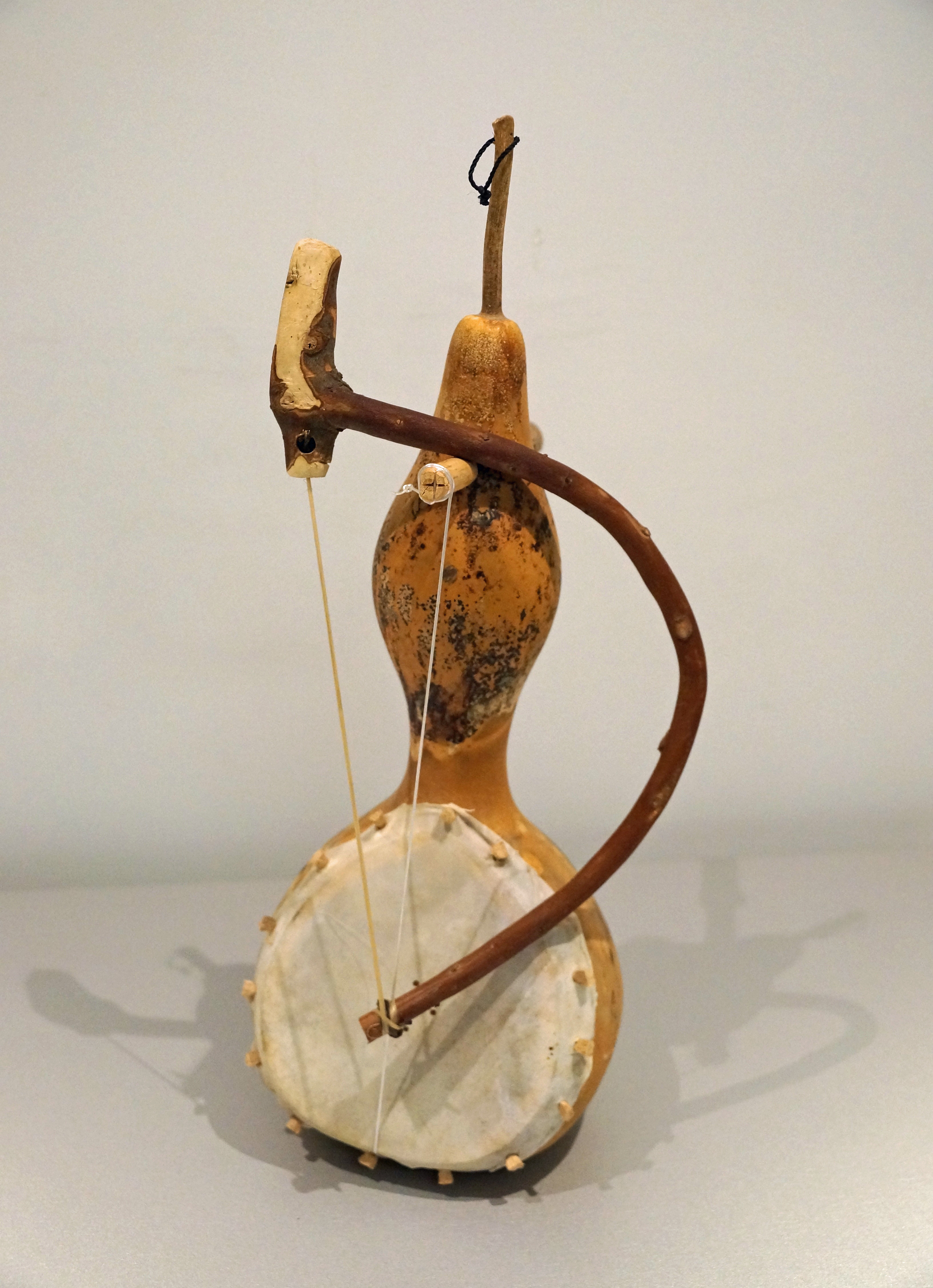
A lahutë from Mirditë in the north

Instrumentation are an integral part of Albanian folk music, especially in the north. Those instruments can be divided into string, wind and percussion categories. They vary from region to region and are used frequently throughout the entire country, performing both dance and instrumental polyphonic folk music.

The lahuta, a single-stringed instrument, is rooted in Albanian epic poetry with emphasis on important historical and patriotic events from history. It is usually played only by men during winter evenings by the fireplace. The instrument is primarily widespread in the mountainous northern area of the country but can be also found in the center of the country. It is often made from a single wood block composed of various types of woods including maple, spruce and oak. The head of the lahuta is decorated with symbols of ancient cults such as the head of the capricorn, which is the symbol of the Helmet of Skanderbeg.

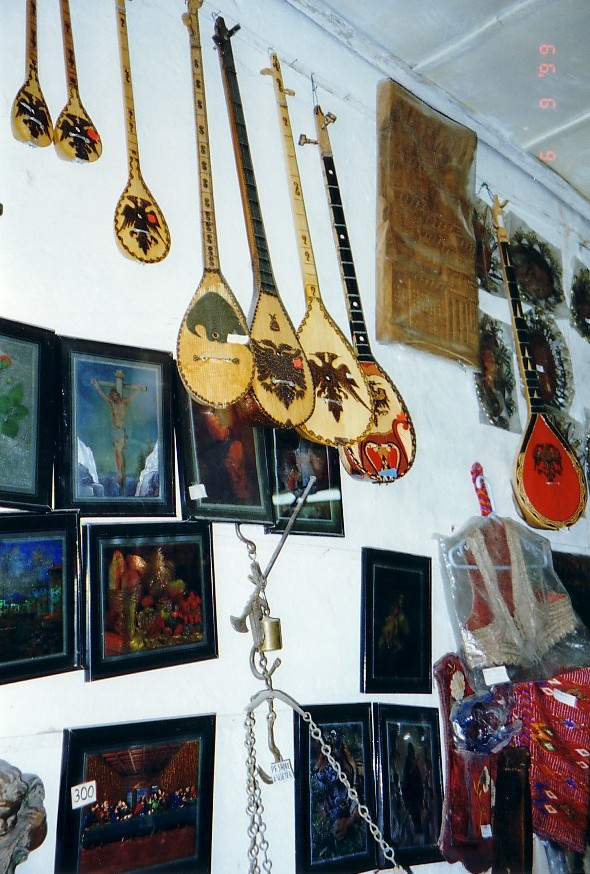
Çifteli was used since the Ottoman occupation of Albania.

Çiftelia is a long necked stringed instrument and frequently used by Gheg Albanians in northeastern Albania, Kosovo, Montenegro and North Macedonia. It is an integral part of northern traditional instrumental ensembles, commonly played in the context of northern wedding music.

Fyell, also known as Zumare, is a similar instrument to a pennywhistle and is mostly played by shepherds in the north along with a shepherd's flute. The instrument contains five holes in each pipe and a bell. The melodies which are played with a fyell are homophonic and sounds nasal as well as very strong and powerful.

Violina is usually used since the 19th century in both the northern and southern region. In the past, it was held in a vertical position like a violoncello or a lahuta but is not practised anymore.

- Clarinet
- Qypi
- Surlja
- Dajreja
- Gajda
- Lodra
- Defi
- Toubeleki
- Albanian Bagpipe

== Popular music ==
=== Emergence ===
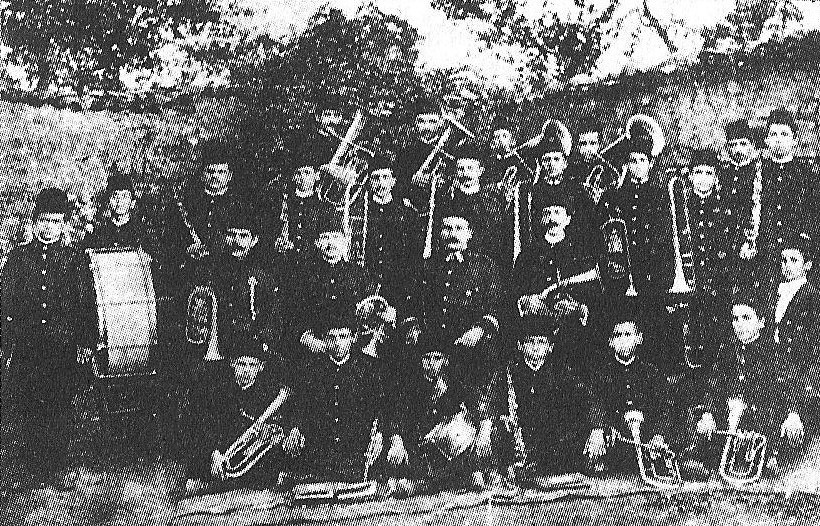
The Band of Freedom, a musical group of the National Renaissance that was active in Korçë, 1909

The development of groups of instrumentalists played a significant role for the establishment of urban music in Albania. In the cities of northern Albania these instrumentalist groups were referred to as ahengje (meaning roughly 'to party' or 'partying') in Shkodër and as orkestrina ('little orchestras') in Tirana, Durrës, Kavajë and Elbasan; while in all cities of southern Albania they were referred to as saze (another term for 'little orchestras'). Conglomerates of solists or groups of instrumentalists were referred to as taifa, which were created in order to facilitate the professional rights and existence of the musicians.

With the growth of the cities their music began to develop peculiar features that were inclined to be accepted by the bulk of Albanians. The popullore ('popular') songs covered repertories which incorporated urban songs, as well as Romani songs, and sometimes also complex folk music. It has been suggested that before the second half of the 20th century "the entire musical life of Albania was determined by folk music". However, while the musical life of Albania may have been strongly influenced by folk music during the first half of the 20th century, urban lyric songs show that by 1930 that influence was no longer strong enough to thoroughly predominate the Albanian musical environment.

=== 1930s Urban Song ===
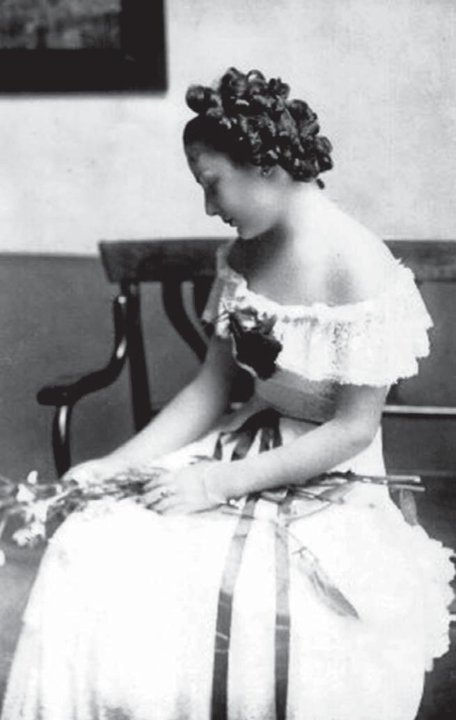
Portrait of Tefta Tashko

The Albanian Urban Lyric Song is a tradition that started in Albania in the 18th century but culminated in the 1930s. These songs are a major part of Albania's music heritage, but have been little-studied by ethnomusicologists, who prefer to focus on the rural folk music that they see as being more authentically Albanian. Out of this melting pot of local and imported styles came a kind of lyrical art song based in the cities of Shkodra, Elbasan, Berat and Korça. Though similar traditions existed in other places, they were little recorded and remain largely unknown. By the end of the 19th century, Albanian nationalism was inspiring many to attempt to remove the elements of Turkish music from Albanian culture, a desire that was intensified following independence in 1912; bands that formed during this era like the Korçë-based Lira Chorus played a variety of European styles, including marches and waltzes. Urban song in the early 20th century could be divided into two styles: the historic or nationalistic style, and the lyrical style. The lyrical style included a wide array of lullabies and other forms, as well as love songs.

In the early decade of the 1930s, urban art song had been incorporated into classical music, while the singer Marie Kraja made a popular career out of art songs; she was one of Albania's first popular singers. The first recordings, however, of urban art song came as early as 1937, with the orchestral sounds of Tefta Tashko-Koço.

=== Communist period ===
Modern Albanian popular music uses instruments like the çifteli and sharki, which have been used in large bands since the Second World War to great popular acclaim; the same songs, accompanied by clarinet and accordion, are performed at small weddings and celebrations.

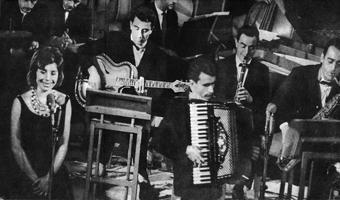
Vaçe Zela performing at Festivali i Këngës 11, Tirana, 1972

A massive rise of popular music – muzika e lehtë – occurred during the communist period in Albania, with renowned singers like Vaçe Zela and Parashqevi Simaku.

The censorship imposed by Enver Hoxha in almost all musical genres banned in particular Western contemporary music from all stages of Albania, and its broadcasting was forbidden. The national song contest Festivali i Këngës has been organized since 1961, and it provided an authorized platform for nonconformist musical forms similar to the Western models.

The 1972 edition was a turning point for the contest, in which dictator Enver Hoxha prosecuted the organisers of Festivali i Këngës 11 after declaring them "enemies of the public". They were accused of endangering the country with "immoral aspects" in their songs and performances. Following this development, the ruling Communist Party imposed numerous sanctions on the festival's content, with a strict censorship on anything deemed inappropriate by the government. This ranged from limiting the type of clothes artists could wear, to restricting their range of movement while performing. The main organisers of the show were accused of conspiring against the country and corrupting its youth.

=== 90s and beyond ===
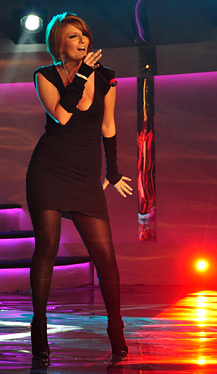
Rosela Gjylbegu performing the winning song at Kënga Magjike 2009

The isolationism of contemporary music ceased after the fall of the regime, and the popular music of Albania was rapidly integrated into the overall trends in Southeast Europe, with the promotion of hybrid musical forms using synthetic accompaniments. Tallava is a pop music genre originating in Kosovo, also popular in Albania and North Macedonia, in the Albanian-speaking communities. Having originated in the Roma community in Kosovo in the 1990s, it is oriental-sounding, and perceived of as low-status. Nevertheless, it is becoming increasingly popular in Albania and North Macedonia. It is identified as part of the wider Pop-folk genre of the Southeastern Europe, which includes Chalga from Bulgaria, Skiladiko from Greece, Manele from Romania and Turbo-folk from Serbia.

Albania has participated in the Eurovision Song Contest since 2004.

=== Albanian music in North Macedonia and Kosovo ===
Kosovo has been home to many important Albanian musicians, and the same can be said for North Macedonia. Prior to the Kosovo War, there was a thriving music industry in Kosovo, which reached new heights in recent years. The Kosovar music industry was home to many famous musicians, including the famous Nexhmije Pagarusha, Ismet Peja and the romantic, more elaborate Qamili i Vogël of Gjakova. The Macedonian band Vëllezërit Aliu became well- known for the traditional vocal duets accompanied by drum box, electric bass, synthesizer and clarinet or saxophone. Gjurmët is one of the most famous and influential 1980s rock bands from Pristina.

=== Rock ===
Rock arrived in Albania, particularly in Kosovo, in 1950 with an American and British influence. The first distinctively Albanian rock band was Blue Star, founded in Pristina.

== Classical music ==
=== Opera ===
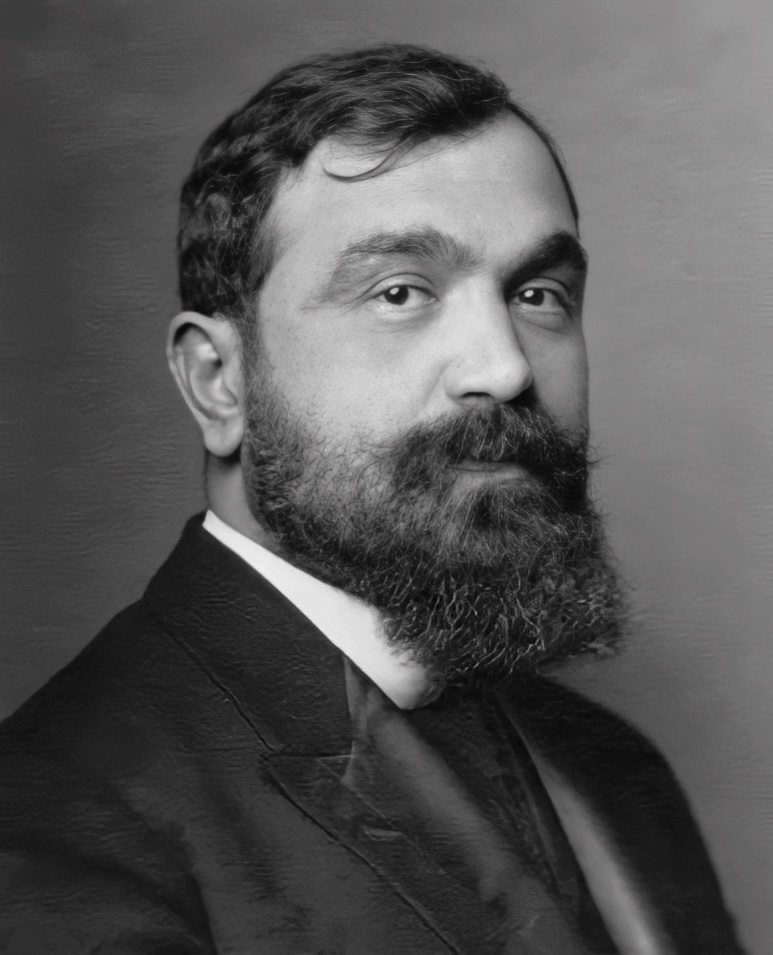
Fan S. Noli 1882—1965

Palokë Kurti is usually said to be among the founders of Albanian opera. A native of Shkodër, he was a musical amateur who composed the Unity of Albania March (Bashkimi Shqipnis) in 1881. Another composer and also a priest, Martin Gjoka is also considered to be one of the most important founders of Albanian classical music. Gjoka is said to be the first Albanian musician who showed great interest in traditional Albanian folk music considerably that of the deep mountainous areas of the north of Albania that was less influenced by foreign music. During his lifetime, he composed several vocal and instrumental music using elements of urban art song and the folk melodies of the north.

In the 19th and 20th century, Fan S. Noli and Mikel Koliqi contributed to the development of classical music culture in Albania. They achieved prominence, with Noli using urban folk songs in his Byzantine Overture and is also known for a symphonic poem called Scanderberg. Koliqi spent much of his life in prison for his religious beliefs, but managed to compose melodramas such as The Siege of Shkodër, The Red Scarf and Rozafa.

Other pivotal composers in modern Albanian classical music were Thoma Nassi, Kristo Kono, Frano Ndoja and Lec Kurti who composed "Arbereshja" in 1915.

Prenk Jakova became well known for operas including Scanderbeg and Mrika, which were influenced by traditional Italian opera, the belcanto style and Albanian folk music. Çesk Zadeja composed in many styles, from symphonies to ballets, beginning in 1956, and also helped found the Music Conservatory of Tirana, the Theatre of Opera and Ballet, and the Assembly of Songs and Dances.

Later in the middle of the 20th century, Albanian composers came to focus on ballets, opera and other styles; these included Tonin Harapi, Tish Daija, Nikolla Zoraqi, Thoma Gaqi, Feim Ibrahimi, Shpëtim Kushta and many others. Since the fall of the communism in Albania in the 21st century, composers like Aleksandër Peçi, ethnologist musician Ramadan Sokoli, Sokol Shupo, Endri Sina, Pëllumb Vorpsi and Vasil Tole have arisen, as have new music institutions like the Society of Music Professionals and the Society of New Albanian Music.

The contemporary opera artists such as Inva Mula, Ermonela Jaho and Saimir Pirgu have achieved international recognition for their music.

== Contemporary music ==
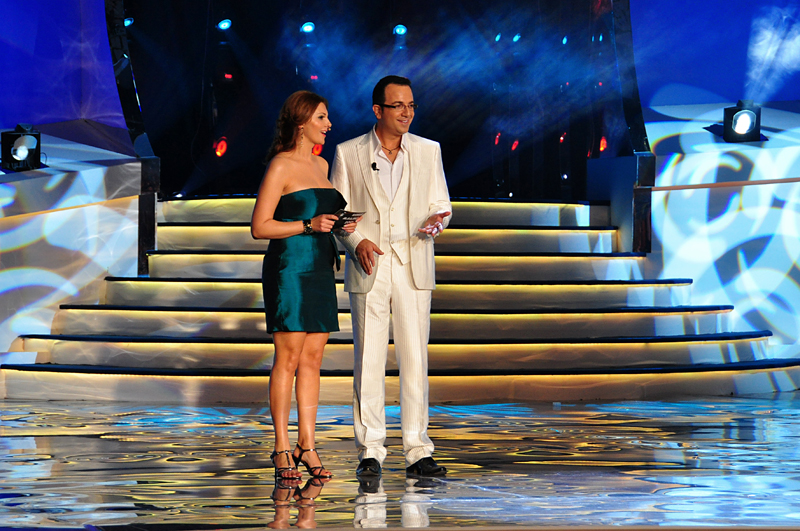
Noted singer and entertainer Ardit Gjebrea founded the Kënga Magjike festival in 1999.

In Albania, the most prominent rock bands and individuals only appeared after 1990 as rock music was prohibited. However, youth groups found ways to listen it through clandestine channels.

Furthermore, electronic music has become a mainstream music genre in Albania. Albanian artists and renowned DJs such as DJ Aldo, Vin Veli, DJ Sardi, Dj Tedd and others are successfully collaborating mainly with Italian and Romanian artists, while showcasing themselves in renown clubs in Tirana and in annual music festivals along the Albanian Riviera such as Turtle Fest and Soundwave Albania.

== See also ==
- Albanian singers
- Albanians
- Culture of Albania
- Music of Kosovo
- List of Albanian musicians
