= Laver Bariu =

Albanian musician and singer (1929–2014)

- Born: May 2, 1929; Përmet
- Died: January 26, 2014 (aged 84)
- Genres: Albanian folk music, Kaba
- Instrument: Clarinet

Laver Bariu (Albanian pronunciation: [laˈvɛɾ baˈɾiu]; May 2, 1929 in Përmet – January 26, 2014) was an Albanian folk clarinetist and singer. He led his musical group for over 40 years and had an immense influence in teaching new generations the Përmet's saze music.

Laver Bariu is considered one of the most influential Albanian clarinetists and best performers of the Albanian kaba.
