= Gjurmët =

Kosovo Albanien new wave band

- Gjurmët in 1985

Background information
- Origin: Pristina, SAP Kosovo, SR Serbia, SFR Yugoslavia
- Genres: New wave; post-punk; synth-pop; folk rock; pop rock
- Years active: 1980–1986 (Reunions: 1988, 2015, 2019)
- Label: RTP
- Past members: Armando Gjini; Bekim Dyla; Migjen Kelmendi; Petrit Riza; Tomor Kurshumliu
- Website: www.gjurmet.info

Gjurmët (trans. The Traces) was an Albanian new wave band formed in Pristina in 1980. The band is notable for being one of the first Albanian rock bands formed by Kosovo Albanians and the first new wave band from SAP Kosovo.

Gjurmët was formed and led by Migjen Kelmendi (vocals, rhythm guitar). The band released only one self-titled album before disbanding in 1986. The band made three one-off reunions, in 1988, 2015 and 2019.

== History ==
=== 1980–1986, 1988 reunion ===
The band's logo

The band was formed in 1980 by Migjen Kelmendi (vocals, rhythm guitar), the son of the writer and journalist Ramiz Kelmendi, inspired by the expansion of the Yugoslav new wave scene. The lineup also included Armando Gjini (piano, synthesizer), Tomor Kurshumliu (vocals, bass guitar), Gazmend Hasbahta (lead guitar), Petrit Riza (drums) and Bekim Dyla (lead guitar). During the same year, the band recorded their first song, being the first new wave song recorded in SAP Kosovo.

In 1982 the band recorded the song "Karrigat" ("Chair"), which Radio Television of Pristina refused to play due to its political-related lyrics. Afterwards the band recorded "Mikrofoni" ("Microphones"), which also had political lyrics but was accepted by Radio Television of Pristina. In 1984 Armando Gjini joined the band as the keyboardist. During the same year, the band recorded the material for their debut album, which was released the following year as a self-titled album. The reason for the delay was the controversial album cover, which featured dancers performing the traditional Albanian "eagle dance", making the shape of a double-headed eagle with their posture. Eventually, the album was released by Radio Television of Pristina, on compact cassette only, featuring the band's photo on the front cover; in the image, Kelmendi is looking at his wrist watch as a comment on the release delay. The album featured a combination of new wave, post-punk, reggae rock and folk music.

In 1986, the band disbanded due to Migjen Kelmendi having been called for his mandatory service in the Yugoslav army.

In 1988 the members of the band got back together, only to record one more song as a nod to their home city, "Heroi i Qytetit Pa Lum" ("Hero of the City without a River").

=== Post-breakup ===
Front cover of the 2002 compilation album LP

Kelmendi became a journalist and was head of editing for the program Contacto on Radio Television of Pristina (1988-1990), executive producer of Victoria Television of New York (1996) and of the Programme Albanian Satellite (1997-1999), and director of television of Radio Television of Kosovo (2000-2001). He was also the founder of the weekly magazine Epoca (1991) and of the literary magazine MM (1996), and is currently editor of the weekly newspaper Java, which he founded in 2001. He has written four books, including To Change The World: A Short History of The Traces, about his musical career.

Kurshumliu got a degree in economy and worked as a counselor in the Executive Council of Kosovo. During the 1989 abolition of the autonomy of the Province of Kosovo, he was fired from his job and moved to London. Riza got a degree in law and continued his career after the dissolution of Gjurmët as a drummer for the band Haliband. Dyla got a degree in architecture. After the rise of Slobodan Milošević to power, he moved to Switzerland, residing in Geneva and working as a designer. Gjini continued his musical career as a composer, and after Milošević's rise to power moved to Croatia.

In 2002, a compilation album LP, featuring a collection of material the band had recorded in the course of the 1980s, was released. The album upon release also featured Migjen Kelmendi's book Gjurmët LP. In 2022 the album was made available at the Internet Archive.

=== 2015 reunion ===
The band reunited in 2015 to perform a concert in Palace of Congresses in Tirana, Albania, on December 29. The concert featured several guest singers from Albania and Kosovo, including the rapper MC Kresha, who, the day before the concert, released the song "Era", recorded in collaboration with Gjurmët.

=== 2019 reunion ===
After the 2015 reunion, Gjurmët reunited once again in 2019 and made a concert in the Palace of Youth and Sports in Pristina, on June 12. The money from the concert went to the Prenk Jakova School of Music in honor of its 70th anniversary. Gjurmët also received the Key of Pristina for the concert by the mayor of the city, Shpend Ahmeti.

== Members ==
- Migjen Kelmendi – vocals, rhythm guitar
- Armando Gjini – piano, synthesizer
- Tomor Kurshumliu – vocals, bass guitar
- Gazmend Hasbahta – lead guitar
- Petrit Riza – drums
- Bekim Dyla – lead guitar

== Discography ==
=== Studio albums ===
- Gjurmët (1985)

=== Compilation albums ===
- LP (2002)

== See also ==
- New wave music in Yugoslavia
- Punk rock in Yugoslavia
- Popular music in the Socialist Federal Republic of Yugoslavia
- Albanian rock
- Albanian music
