= Sherif Merdani =

Albanian singer and diplomat (1940–2021)

- Born: 14 May 1940 (age 86); Korçë, Kingdom of Albania
- Died: 29 August 2021 (aged 81); Tirana, Albania
- Years active: 1960s–1973; 1990s–2021
- Musical career
- Genres: Popular music
- Occupations: singer, diplomat
- Instruments: vocals

Sherif Merdani (14 May 1940 – 29 August 2021) was an Albanian singer and later diplomat, known for his contribution to Albanian popular music during the late 1960s and early 1970s. His artistic career was abruptly halted by the communist regime, following the aftermath of the 11th edition of Festivali i Këngës, which led to his arrest and imprisonment. After the fall of communism and his release from the notorious Qafë-Bari Prison, where he spent part of his 16 years, Merdani returned to public life and served in Albania's diplomatic service.

== Biography ==
=== Early life and education ===
Sherif Merdani was born in Korçë, Kingdom of Albania. He developed a strong interest in music from an early age, despite coming from a family labeled by the communist regime as having an “unfavorable biography”. Merdani would complete his education at the Pedagogical High School and began his career as a teacher in the village of Backë, in the Skrapar region.

Having the support of composer Agim Krajka, he was offered the chance to perform with the Korçë variety ensemble. After relocating to Tirana for studies, his vocal abilities were further recognized and encouraged by the celebrated singer Vaçe Zela, which greatly contributed to his emergence as a stage performer.

=== Music career ===
Merdani made his debut at the 8th edition of Festivali i Këngës and went on to participate in several subsequent editions. He achieved the height of his fame in 1971, winning First Prize with the song "Kënga e nënës". The years that followed, would soon mark a turning point in his career, as government authorities initiated a harsh crackdown against artistic expression and cultural reformation.

=== Arrest and imprisonment ===
Merdani was arrested in Librazhd, where he was employed at the Palace of Culture. On 2 October 1973, the District Court convicted him of “agitation and propaganda,” sentencing him to ten years in prison. While serving his term in the Spaç Prison, he was given an additional ten-year sentence.

In total, he spent sixteen years incarcerated, serving time in Spaç, Burrel and Qafë Bari, before being released in July 1989.

=== Later life and diplomacy ===
After the collapse of the regime, Merdani entered Albania's diplomatic service. During the 1990s he served as First Secretary at the Albanian Embassy in Rome and later at the Embassy in Bucharest. Upon returning to Albania, he worked in the Directorate of Culture, at the Ministry of Foreign Affairs.

=== Death ===
Sherif Merdani passed away in Tirana on 29 August 2021. He was married to his wife, Rozalba, with whom they shared a son.

== Discography ==
=== Festivali i Këngës ===
Year	Song
1969	"Shokë të pandarë"
1970	"Mes jush"
1970	"Pres në Tetor"
1971	"Vite pa harrim"
1971	"Kënga e nënës"
1971	"Ne të dy" (feat. Justina Aliaj)
1972	"Vajza e qelqtë"
1972	"Rruga e Dibrës"
1972	"Duart e tua"
1995	"Sinfonia e nënës"
1997	"Bisedoj me dashurinë"

=== Singles ===
Year	Song
—	"Kartolina"
—	"A do vish sivjet në plazh"
—	"Se kënduam "Let it be"
—	"Takim pas vitesh"
—	"Sot ora shtatë"
