= Ethem Qerimaj =

Albanian violinist (1934–2022)

Ethem Qerimaj (1934–2022) was an Albanian virtuoso violinist, and one of the best performers of the Albanian kaba.

== Biography ==
Ethem was born in Cakran, Fier, to an Albanian family from Përmet (southern Albania), a region from which many important performers of southern Albanain folk music emerged. Although his family was originally engaged in milling, Ethem's father also performed folk music, and with him, young Ethem started playing firstly the mandolin and then the violin.

An event that changed Ethem's whole life took place when he was 12 years old: when the Albanian prime minister of the time, Mehmet Shehu, came to Cakran with government officials, a lunch was held for them at the village school and Ethem was chosen as a musician to play a few songs on his violin. His skills impressed Prime Minister Shehu, who wrote Ethem's name in a notebook and told him to get ready because he would soon receive music education in Albaia's capital, Tirana. Some time passed after the event without notification from the Prime Minister, but one day, police officers came to the village and put Ethem in their vehicle without giving any explanation, reason why Ethem's family thought with fear and sadness that the police had arrested him. However, when Ethem arrived to the building of the Filarmonia Shqiptare ("Albanian Philharmonic Orchestra") in Tirana, he was told that he was brought there to study music on the orders of Prime Minister Shehu.

In the institution Qerimaj started his studies with teachers Lam Petrela and Adem Beqiri, violinists who graduated from Soviet conservatories. The two teachers soon realized that young Ethem could not even read musical notation, but considering that the order to teach him came from a high authority, they decided to give him a one-year trial period, which Ethem successfully passed. In the following years Ethem studied classical Western violin with Lam Petrela and Pjetër Gaci.

After his education, he served as second violin group leader in the Albanian Philharmonic Orchestra for five years and in the Albanian State Opera and Theater Orchestra for thirteen years. Thereafter he continued to serve in the Albanian Army Orchestra until his retirement. During all his service he performed in many countries around the world, and wherever he performed, he never neglected to play the violin in the folk music style with which he was imbued since his early years as a musician.

Ethem continued to perform until his death on September 13, 2022.

== Bibliography ==
- Altınbüken, Aida Pulake; Öztürk, Yelda Özgen (2023). "Güney Arnavutluk halk müziğine Ethem Qerimaj ekseninden bakış ve bir kaba icrasının analizi" [An overview of Southern Albanian folk music from the perspective of Ethem Qerimaj and the analysis of a kaba performance]. Sonbahar. 11 (3): 425–445. doi:10.12975/rastmd.20231134.
