= Tallava =

Music genre in Albania

- Stylistic origins: Romani music; Albanian music; Kosovar music; Turkish Music; Byzantine music; pop; folk music; dance music
- Cultural origins: Romani in Kosovo

Tallava or Talava is a music genre originating from Albanian-speaking Roma communities in Kosovo as well as in North Macedonia, with a presence in Albania, Bulgaria and Romania. Having originated in the Roma community in Kosovo, and having significant influence from rural Albanian communities in the 1990s, it evokes regional Balkan musical styles (e.g., microtones, vocal glissando, and certain musical instruments) and has become popular in Albania and North Macedonia. It is identified as part of the wider pop-folk genre of the Southeastern Europe, which includes Chalga from Bulgaria, Skiladiko from Greece, Manele from Romania and turbo-folk from Serbia.

== History ==
Tallava originated in the 1980s and 1990s within the Albanian-speaking areas of Kosovo region, created by the Romani ethnic minority community, and later on influenced by various rural Albanian communities. The name is derived from Romani tel o vas, meaning "under the hand", referring to the čoček dance where the hands are waved delicately. Kosovo Albanian refugees of the Kosovo War in North Macedonia had brought their music with them, including Tallava. It has since also been adopted by the non-Albanian-speaking Roma in North Macedonia.

== Identity and reputation ==
Tallava occupies an ambivalent place in popular consciousness; it is both celebrated and vilified by the wider Albanian community. In the minds of many, its Ashkali origins, and later on its various rural Albanian influences, imbue it with a lower-class connotation, and it is often disparaged.

However, tallava is extremely popular and considered by many necessary for any party, especially a wedding. Kosovo Roma musician Bajram Kafu Kinolli suggests that it is simple racism that gave tallava its low status: “Bearing in mind that it was the Roma, Ashkali and Egyptians who mostly cultivated tallava and that they are in a crisis in regard to presenting their culture… some people label it as a degradation, especially today when the word ‘tallava’ is a dirty, filthy, and degrading term for anything in Kosovo.”

== Style and attributes ==
Initially, tallava music was performed in cafes, and the def, a kind of tambourine, predominated. In the 1990s, other instruments like drums, bass guitar, guitar, accordion and clarinet were incorporated. Kafu Kinolli sees tallava as distinct from the wider turbo-folk umbrella genre in that whereas a turbo-folk song has a linear structure (e.g., verse-chorus-verse-chorus), tallava songs are longer, more improvisational, and without a definitive structure. However, this improvisational character leads other musicologists, such as Astrit Stafai, to believe that tallava does not constitute a genre in and of itself: “... tallava is an improvisation of a certain moment, for example at a family-related or personal occasion. Tallava has neither a musical form nor development. It just doesn't have the proper concept to be a musical style”.

== See also ==
- Music of Kosovo
- Music of Albania
- Pop-folk
