= Kaba (Albanian music) =

Music genre

Kaba is an Albanian music genre, a folk instrumental expression of the Albanian Iso-Polyphony, which is recognized as cultural heritage by UNESCO.

The Albanian kaba is performed with a soloist playing the clarinet or violin, accompanied by the instrumental ensembles called saze playing lla(h)uta (saz or lute) and other instruments. The musical features of the kaba vary according to the ethnocultural and musical regions of southern Albania.

== Origin ==
Kaba evolved as an instrumental expression of the Albanian Iso-Polyphony, which is considered to have its roots in the many-voiced vajtim, the southern Albanian traditional lamentation of the dead.

== Performers ==
Among the most influential and best performers of the Albanian kaba are clarinetists Laver Bariu and Remzi Lela, and violinist Ethem Qerimaj.

== Bibliography ==
- Altınbüken, Aida Pulake; Öztürk, Yelda Özgen (2023). "Güney Arnavutluk halk müziğine Ethem Qerimaj ekseninden bakış ve bir kaba icrasının analizi" [An overview of Southern Albanian folk music from the perspective of Ethem Qerimaj and the analysis of a kaba performance]. Sonbahar. 11 (3): 425–445. doi:10.12975/rastmd.20231134.
- Smith, Dave (2013). "The Albanian Kaba and the Clarinet". In Heaton, Roger (ed.). The Versatile Clarinet. Routledge. pp. 47–50. ISBN 978-1135477240.
- Tole, Vasil S. (2022). "Kabaja With Saze as a Ballad Without Words" (PDF). Studia Albanica (2): 43–50. ISSN 0585-5047.
