= Ison =

Ison, ISON or variant, may refer to:

== Geography ==
- Isön, a small island in lake Storsjön, Jämtland, Sweden

== People ==
=== First name / given name ===
- Ison (rapper), stage name of Ison Glasgow, a Swedish rapper of American origin

=== Last name / family name ===
- David Ison, Anglican clergyman
- Hobart Ison, American businessman
- Paul E. Ison (1916–2001), American Marine during World War II
- Sheila Ison (1944–2002), American political activist
- Tara Ison, American novelist
- Wayne Ison (1924–2014), American aircraft designer

== Ison aircraft ==
- ISON Airbike
- Ison miniMAX
- Ison Hi-MAX

== Music ==
- Ison (music), a drone note of Byzantine chant
- ISON (album), 2017 debut album by Iranian-Dutch singer Sevdaliza
- Mega Ison, a method of religious chant composition

== Other ==
- Ison, a muscadine (Vitis rotundifolia) cultivar
- ISON, an IRC command to see whether a nick is currently online

== Acronyms ==
- International Scientific Optical Network or ISON
- Comet ISON, a disintegrated sungrazing comet

== See also ==
- Ison Creek Kimberlite
