= Albanian Urban Lyric Song =

Albanian musical tradition

The Albanian Urban Lyric Song is a musical tradition of Albania that started in the 18th century and culminated in the 1930s.

== Sources ==
- Koço, Eno (2004), Albanian urban lyric song in the 1930s, Scarecrow Press, ISBN 978-0-8108-4890-0
