= Blla Blla Blla =

Albanian-Macedonian rock band

- Origin: Skopje, North Macedonia (Yugoslavia at time of formation)
- Genres: Punk rock Avantgarde; Progressive rock
- Years active: 1988-present
- Labels: Bagi Music; Lithium
- Members: Idriz Ameti; Dejan Evrushoski; Krenar Ismaili; Egzon; Arsim

Blla Blla Blla is an Albanian-Macedonian rock band from Skopje. It was formed in 1988 by then band members Idriz Ameti, Ermal Skupi (Mehmeti), Nikola Bočvarov and Blagojče Penov. Later, Ermal (who played the violin) left the band and was replaced by Krenar Ismaili (vocal and violin). Idriz Ameti is the singer. Most of the songs are in Albanian. Their style is called “Over Sky Ballkanishe Re-form” by the band itself, though there is no general consensus in categorising their characteristic rock. Other styles or genres used are Balkan-rock and punk.

Their first album was released in May 2000 called Blla Blla Blla. "At that time we possessed a minimalist – original approach to music that brought refreshment to these Balkan spaces" the band were quoted as saying about their first album on their official MySpace page. Their second album, called Over Sky Ballkanishe Re-form, was released in 2005. Their music is considered influential beyond Macedonian borders. The band is one of the participants in the Balkan Streets series of South-eastern Europe music festivals featuring popular local groups in multicultural venues. They were among the artistes appearing at the first festival in Kumanovo, Macedonia, in 2009 and also featured on the 2011 Balkan Streets programme.

== Discography ==
- Underground Macedonia split with No Name Nation (2000, Blla Blla Blla tracks recorded in 1990)
- Blla Blla Blla (2000)
- Oversky Ballkanishe Re-form (2005)
- Lamtumirë (2011)
- Brum për medioferr (2017)

== See also ==
- Albanian rock
