= Gjirokastër National Folk Festival =

Folk festival in Albania

- Official logo
- Genre: folk
- Locations: Gjirokastër, Albania
- Years active: 1968–present
- Organiser: Ministry of Culture

Gjirokastër National Folk Festival (Albanian: Festivali Folklorik Kombëtar i Gjirokastrës) is an artistic festival taking place every five years at Gjirokastër Castle in Gjirokastër, southern Albania. The festival was first held in 1968 and is regarded as the most important event in Albanian culture. The festival showcases Albanian traditional music, dress and dance from Albania, the diaspora, and Albanian inhabited lands throughout the Balkans and Southern Italy. The Gjirokastër Festival followed the tradition of the Folklore Festivals started in Tirana in 1949.

== History ==
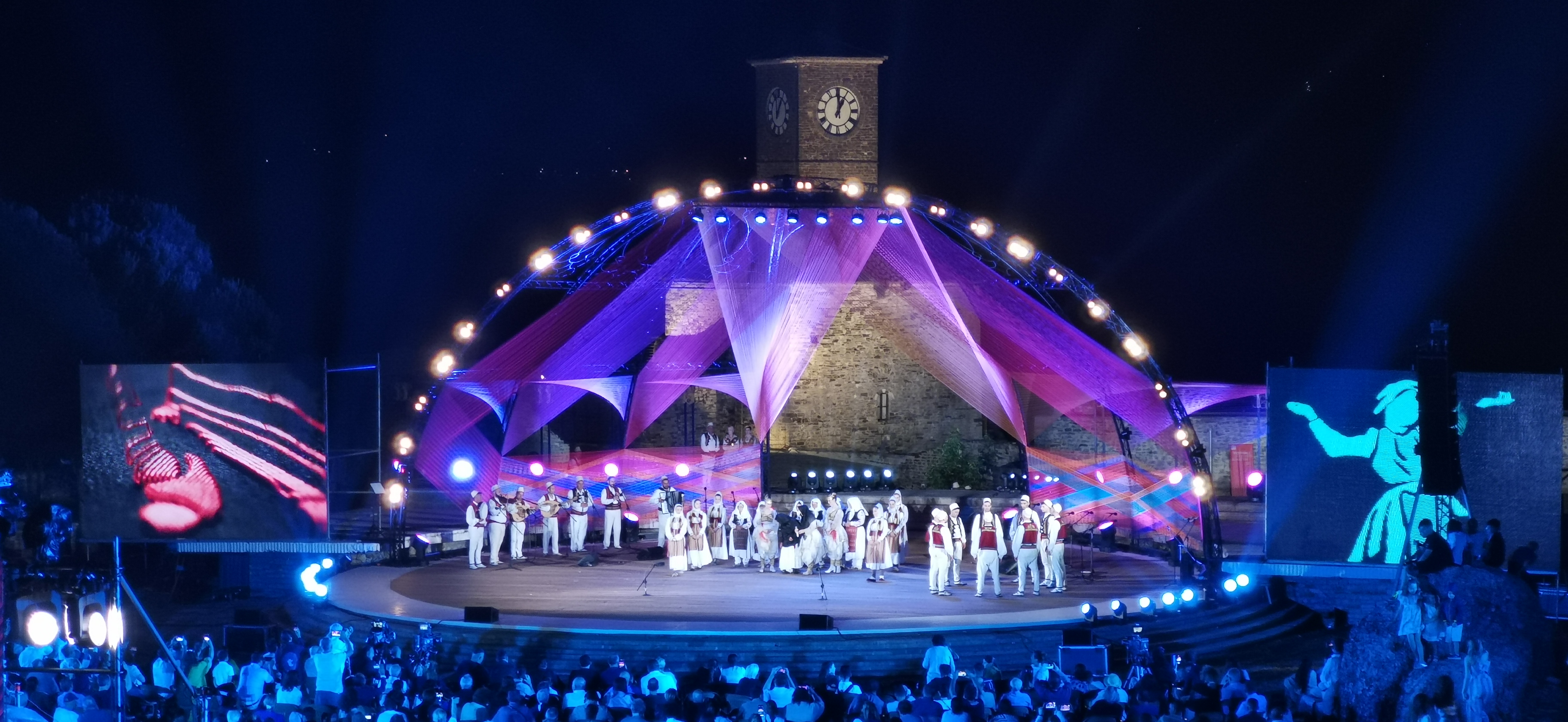
Stage of Gjirokaster Festival at castle in 2023

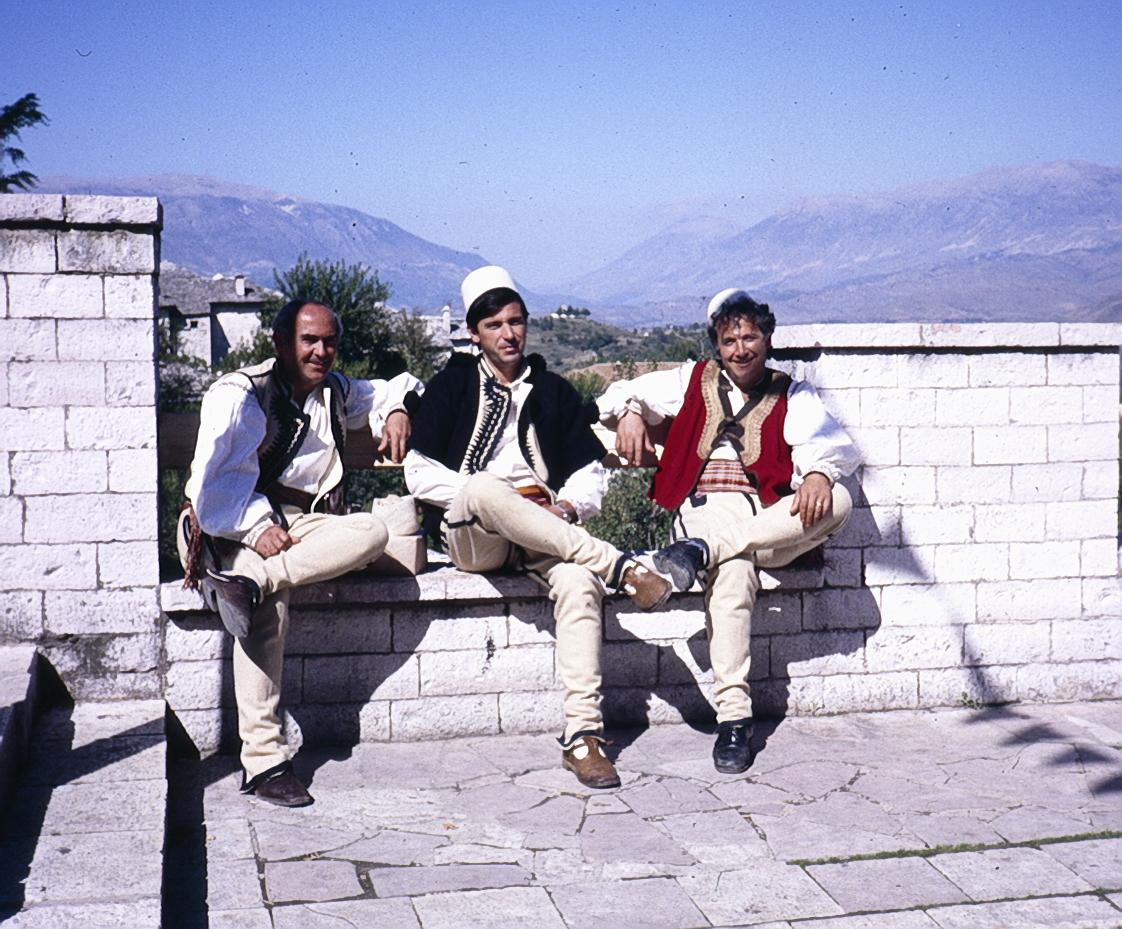
Folk singers in the 1988 edition

The Gjirokastër National Folk Festival was preceded by the National Festival of Song, Music and Dance held in Tirana, capital of Albania in 1949 and subsequently on November 25–27, 1959. Ten years later, on October 8–16, 1968, the first National Folklore Festival was held in Gjirokastër to celebrate the birthday of Enver Hoxha, the communist leader of Albania and native of the city. The festival was reheld every five years in 1973, 1978, 1983, and 1988. In 1995 the festival was held in the citadel of Berat, while since September 2000 it has been held again in Gjirokastër.

The 9th season was held in September 2009. The winners of the Festival was the Shkodër County as overall best performance, whereas the best individual performances was deemed those of bards Sherif Dervishi and Myfterin Uka.

The festival's 10th season took place from May 10–16, 2015.

The latest season took place from June 24 to July 1, 2023.

== Other festivals ==
Traditional Albanian clothing, dances, and folklore are showcased in several other festivals including Sofra Dardane every June in Bajram Curri, Oda Dibrane in Peshkopi, Logu i Bjeshkeve every August in Kelmend, Cham Dance Festival in Saranda and Konispol, and other festivals in various Albanian cities.

== Bibliography ==
- Novik, Alexander (2020). "Gjirokastra Folklore Festival as the Main Ritual Event in Albanian Cultural Life at the Beginning of the 21st Century" (PDF). The Yearbook of Balkan and Baltic Studies. 3: 257–182. doi:10.7592/YBBS3.08.
