= Ramadan Sokoli =

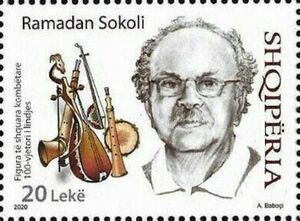
Ramadan Sokoli on a 2021 stamp of Albania

Ramadan Sokoli (14 June 1920 – 12 March 2008) was an Albanian ethnomusicologist, musician, composer and writer. He is regarded as one of the most distinguished scholars of the Albanian and Balkan music.

Ramadan Sokoli was born on June 14, 1920, in Shkodër. He graduated from the elementary and highschool of Shkodër before moving to Florence to study musicology. After World War II he created and became the head of the department of musical folklore. Sokoli is considered to be a pioneer of Albanian ethnomusicology. His work on Ottoman music modes and practices in Balkan music has been regarded as one of the most important ones on the subject.
