= Prenk Jakova School of Music =

The Prenk Jakova Music School (Albanian: Shkolla e Muzikës "Prenk Jakova") is a music school based in Pristina, Kosovo. Named after famed composer Prenk Jakova, it is one of the oldest such institutions in the country.

== History ==
The school includes both grade-school and higher education students. The school was founded in 1949 by two teachers educating a small number of students. In 1961, more advanced classes were added, including music theory, instrument training, and music education itself. Piano, violin, guitar, wind instruments, and solo vocal music are all taught, as are conducting, composition, and ballet choreography.
