= Festivali i Këngës 11 =

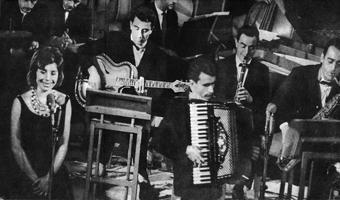

Dates and venue
- First night: 22 December 1972
- Second night: 23 December 1972
- Final: 24 December 1972
- Venue: Theater of Opera & Ballet; Tirana, Albania

Production
- Broadcaster: Radio Televizioni Shqiptar (RTSH)
- Director: Mihallaq Luarasi
- Presenters: Edi Luarasi; Bujar Kapexhiu

Participants
- Number of entries: 20
- Number of finalists: 10

Vote
- Winning song: "Erdhi pranvera" by Tonin Tërshana

Festivali i Këngës 11 (Albanian for the "11th Song Festival") took place from 22 to 24 December 1972 in Tirana, Albania, and was organized and produced by Radio Televizioni Shqiptar (RTSH).

The Albanian dictator of the time, Enver Hoxha, perceived the organisers of the event to be "Enemies of the Public", a name given to all the subjects who he considered a danger to the country. Many of them were subsequently murdered after being accused of endangering the country's mentality by introducing an immoral aspect to the show, and plotting against the government by influencing the Albanian youth. The claims were out of context and these murders were used as an example and a statement for future organizers.

== The program ==
The festival was held on the 22, 23, and 24 of December 1972, over three nights. All 20 songs were presented on the first night, resung on the second one, and only the selection of the 10 best songs were sung again in the final.

The winner of the festival was Tonin Tërshana with "Kur vjen pranvera" (When spring comes).

First night – 22 December 1972
R/O	Title	Composer	Lyricist	Artist
First part
1	"Sonte u takoj të gjithëve"	Josif Minga	Shaban Murati	Zija Saraçi
2	"Në ekranin e televizorit"	Agron Xhunga	Ibrahim Gani	Justina Aliaj
3	"Dhoma 23"	Flamur Shehu	Betim Muço	Shkëlqim Pashollari
4	"Shoqja më e mirë"	Çesk Zadeja	Petraq Qafëzezi	Dorian Nini
5	"Një kujtim nga deti"	Vasil Çuni	Sadik Bejko	Lefter Agora
6	"Cila stinë të pëlqen"	Gëzim Laro	Ilirian Mezini	Valentina Gjoni
7	"Kur vjen pranvera"	Pjetër Gaci	Fatos Arapi	Tonin Tërshana
8	"Përshëndetje"	Avni Mula	Tonin Miloti	Petrit Dobjani
9	"Rruga e Dibrës"	Alfons Balliçi	Agim Shehu	Kompleksi i Elbasanit
10	"Kush më njeh mua"	Agim Prodani	Dritëro Agolli	Ema Qazimi
Second part
11	"Kur dëgjojmë zëra nga bota"	Françesk Radi	Sadik Bejko	Françesk Radi
12	"Vajza e qelqeve"	Tasim Hoshafi		Hilmi Hoxha
13	"Nuk them se s'të kujtoj"	Ferdinand Deda	Lirim Deda	Fatbardha Rakipi
14	"Mozaik tingujsh, mozaik ngjyrash"	Aleksandër Peçi	Natasha Lako	Liliana Kondakçi
15	"Vajzat dhe kompozitori"	Aleksandër Lalo	Roland Gjoza	Suzana Qatipi
16	"Mbrëmja e fundit"	Enver Shëngjergji	Enver Shëngjergji	Bashkim Alibali
17	"Një degë e gjelbër"	Kujtim Laro	Sadik Bejko	Iliriana Çarçani
18	"Natën vonë"	Tish Daija	Llazar Siliqi	Vaçe Zela
19	"Duart e tua"	Kastriot Gjini	Agim Shehu	Sherif Merdani
20	"Udhët janë të bukura"	Agim Krajka	Agim Shehu	Lindita Sota

Final – 24 December 1972
R/O	Title	Composer	Lyricist	Artist	Place
1	"Sonte u takoj të gjithëve"	Josif Minga	Shaban Murati	Zija Saraçi	—N/a
2	"Shoqja më e mirë"	Çesk Zadeja	Petraq Qafëzezi	Dorian Nini	—N/a
3	"Mozaik tingujsh, mozaik ngjyrash"	Aleksandër Peçi	Natasha Lako	Liliana Kondakçi	—N/a
4	"Mbrëmja e fundit"	Enver Shëngjergji	Enver Shëngjergji	Bashkim Alibali	—N/a
5	"Kur vjen pranvera"	Pjetër Gaci	Fatos Arapi	Tonin Tërshana	1
6	"Natën vonë"	Tish Daija	Llazar Siliqi	Vaçe Zela	—N/a
7	"Një degë e gjelbër"	Kujtim Laro	Sadik Bejko	Iliriana Çarçani	—N/a
8	"Duart e tua"	Kastriot Gjini	Agim Shehu	Sherif Merdani	—N/a
9	"Kush më njeh mua"	Agim Prodani	Dritëro Agolli	Ema Qazimi	—N/a
10	"Udhët janë të bukura"	Agim Krajka	Agim Shehu	Lindita Sota	—N/a

== Political reactions and persecutions ==
After the Festival, in the 4th Plenum of the Central Committee of the Labour Party, the Festival was openly criticised and all its songs banned. In all the newspapers of the time, individuals and different groups wrote and expressed their opinions about it and about foreign shows in general. The orientations coming from above encouraged that everyone should condemn them without fear and with revolutionary courage. This was the reason why the letters and writings coming from below, extremely threatening and wild, insisted that the Party take measures.

In a speech held at the Presidium of the People’s Assembly, Enver Hoxha, had spoken mercilessly against the Director of RTSH, Todi Lubonja, who was arrested, tried and imprisoned, as well as the propaganda secretary of the Tirana Party Committee, Fadil Paçrami.

The director of the festival, Mihal Luarasi, was sentenced to spend 8 years in prison. His wife, Edi Luarai, who presented the festival, was fired together with the other presenter, Bujar Kapexhiu. Bujar was later sent to a forced labor camp.

The singer Justina Aliaj and authors Françesk Radi and Dorian Nini were also fired, banned from the festival and later persecuted.
