= Vasil Tole =

Albanian composer

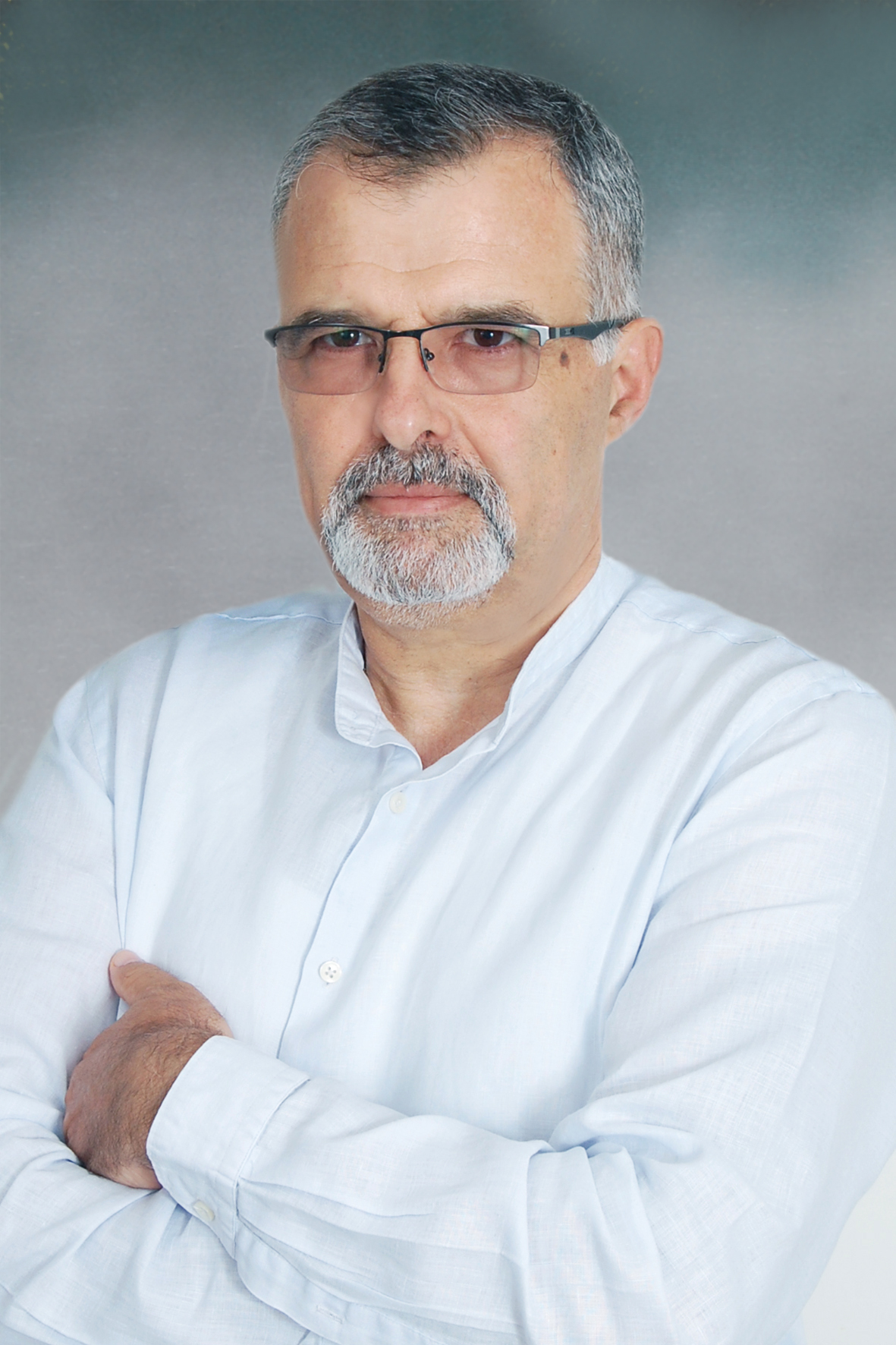
Vasil Tole in 2020

Vasil S. Tole (born 22 November 1963) is an Albanian composer, ethnomusicologist, and cultural administrator. A proponent of European classical music, his compositions encompass opera, chamber music, orchestral works, symphony and instrumental concerts, and various pieces for small ensembles and solo instruments. He is the author of several books, primarily focusing on Albanian music.

Tole has served as a professor at the University of Arts in Tirana since 1994. He also holds multiple leadership roles in cultural institutions, including head of the Department for Cultural Heritage at the Albanian Ministry of Culture, president of the National Music Council, and a member of the International Music Council.

== Career ==
Tole graduated from the Academy of Arts in 1987 with a degree in composition. From 1987 to 1990, he served as artistic director of the Shtëpia e Kulturës (House of Culture) in his hometown of Përmet. He subsequently joined the Faculty of Music as professor of Albanian Music Folklore and later became professor of composition. During his tenure, he completed his PhD in ethnomusicology with a dissertation titled Structure and Semantics in the Instrumental Folk Music of Southern Albania.

Between 1994 and 1995, Tole pursued postgraduate studies in composition at the Folkwang University of the Arts in Essen, Germany, under Wolfgang Hufschmidt. In 1996, he undertook postdoctoral research in musicology at the University of Athens, Greece. He was appointed Associate Professor in 2000 and full Professor in 2004.

Tole emerged as a leading figure in Albania's new generation of composers, advocating for innovative approaches to restructuring traditional Albanian folk music while emphasizing national identity and contemporary experimentation. Alongside his compositional work, he engaged in scholarly research, journalism, and international collaborations. He participated in conferences, festivals, and competitions across Europe, North America, and Asia, including engagements in Greece, Italy, Austria, the United States, and China. His writings have been published in academic journals and cultural magazines, and he has collaborated extensively with Albanian Radio and Television. He won first prize at the 2001 Dimitris Mitropoulos International Composition Competition in Athens for his opera Eumenidet.

In the 1990s, Tole co-founded several key Albanian music institutions, including:

- The Association for New Albanian Music (1993).
- The Albanian branch of Répertoire International de Littérature Musicale (RILM) (1995).
- The Albanian section of the International Council of Organizations of Folklore Festivals and Folk Arts (CIOFF) (1996).

He chaired the Albanian Music Council from 1995 onward and held memberships in organizations such as the International Music Council (Paris), the Society for Ethnomusicology (USA), and GEMA (Germany).

From 1997 to 1999, Tole directed the National Theatre of Opera and Ballet. Between 2001 and 2007, he led the Directorate of Cultural Heritage at Albania's Ministry of Tourism, Culture, Youth, and Sports. In 2005, he played a pivotal role in securing UNESCO's designation of Albanian folk iso-polyphony as a Masterpiece of the Oral and Intangible Heritage of Humanity. Tole was elected to the Academy of Sciences of Albania in 2008, serving as its scientific secretary (2013–2019) and later as deputy chairperson (2019–present).

== Musical compositions ==
2022: "Koncert" për violinë dhe orkestër (dhe klavir)

2022: "Temë me variacione", për fagot e piano (dhe orkestër harqesh)

2022: "Agoj 3", "Temë me 12 variacione", për piano solo

2022: "Broj, broj, broj", për kor "a cappella", SATB

2022: "Korba unë, qyqja unë", për kor "a cappella", SATB

2022: "Hajde, hajde", për kor "a cappella"

2022: "A se", për kor "a cappella", SATB

2022: "Amane", për kor "a cappella", SATB

2022: "Elegji", për kuartet kornosh in F

2022: "Amane" për kuartet fagotësh

2022: "Korba unë, qyqja unë" për kuartet fagotësh

2021: "PolifonISO", për piano solo

2021: "Valle antike-danse antique" pёr orkestёr harqesh\string orchestra

2021: "Cim, cim, ca", pёr soprano\tenor e piano. Poezia popullore

2021: "Kur mё shkon sokakut", pёr soprano\tenor dhe piano. Poezia popullore

2020: "Gjergj Kastrioti Skënderbeu, kryezot i Arbërit", për solistё, kor SATB dhe orkestër simfonike, (Premiera në Kosovë)

- Uvertura me perkusion

- Introit: Requiem aeternam, pёr kor dhe orkestёr harqesh

- "Ëndrra e Shёn Gjergjit", arie pёr solist bariton dhe orkestёr

- "Kyrie Eleison" pёr solist soprano, kor dhe orkestёr

- "Malli pёr atdhe", arie pёr solist bariton dhe orkestёr

- "Sanctus" pёr kor dhe orkestёr

- "Lirinё nuk jua solla unё", arie pёr solist tenor dhe orkestёr

- "Gloria" pёr solistё SATB, kor dhe orkestёr

- "O burrani mbi ta", arie pёr solit tenor, kor dhe orkestёr

- "Agnus Dei" dhe "Vajtimi i Lekё Dukagjinit pёr Gjergj Kastriotin--Skёnderbeun", pёr solist, kor dhe orkestёr

- Finale -"Skёnderbeu kryezot", me orkestёr simfonike

2020: "Missa Solemnis", për solistё, kor SATB dhe orkestër simfonike

2020: "Arbёreshe", temё me variacione pёr piano

2020: "Ti meriton", pёr kor SATB dhe për zёra burrash-baritonё, mbi tekstin e Liturgjisё Orthodhokse

2018: "Agoj 2", album pianistik me 4 pjesȅ pȅr piano

- Vals i Trishtuar

- Valle

2017: "EP", pёr orkestёr simfonike

2017: "Diligencia De Carmona", për SATB, poezia në spanjisht Fernando Villalon

2017: "Janinulla", për soprano\tenor dhe piano. Poezia popullore

2016: "Asaman", për soprano/tenor dhe piano. Poezia popullore

2016: "Dhimbja e gëzimit", me poezi të Florion Zykës. Festival i 55 - RTSH-së

2016: "Amen", pёr piano

2016: "Bach-Pentatonic", pёr piano

"Bach-Pentatonic (LLUPA & GEGPRIFTI)

2016: "Suita pastorale", me tre kohë pёr flaut solo

2016: "Suita pastorale", me tre kohë, pёrshtatur pёr klarinetё solo

2015: "Strumbullari", pёr piano

2015: "Iso-polyphony multiverse", pёr orkestёr simfonike

2015: "Alla shqiptarçe", (Vlashi) pёr violinë solo

"Alla shqiptarçe" (Kadesha)

2014: "Himn jetës", kёngё me poezi të Fatos Arapit. Festivali i 53 i RTSH-së

2012: "Tetë variacione mbi një temë popullore beratase", pёr piano

2012: "Red and Black Flag"-prelude, pёr piano

2010: "AGOJ", album pianistik për fëmijë

-Përmetare

-Elbasanase

-Korçare

-Vlonjate

-Dropullitë

-Shkodrane

-Kosovare

-Beratase

-Kolonjare

2004: OPERA "EUMENIDES", per solist, kor, recitues, valltare dhe orkestër

-"Prologue-Uvertura" pёr orkestёr

-"Aria e Pithisё", pёr soliste soprano dhe orkestёr

-Interlud, pёr orkestёr

-"Aria e Apollonit" pёr solist baritone dhe orkestёr

-"Dueti i Orestit me Apollonit", duet me orkestёr

-"Aria e Klitemnestrёs", pёr dy soliste: soprano, alto, kori i Eumenideve dhe orkestёr

-"Hakmarrja", korifeja dhe kori i Eumenideve" dhe orchestra

-"Aria e Apollonit" pёr solit baritone dhe kori i priftёrinjve tё Delfit dhe orkestёr

-"Aria e Orestit", pёr solit tenor dhe orkestёr

-"Ndjekja", Korifeja dhe kori i Eumenideve dhe orkestёr

-"Dueti i Orestit dhe Korifesё" dhe orchestra

-"Vallja dhe Himni i Eumenideve", pёr balet, korin e Eumenideve dhe orkestёr

-"Aria e Athinasё", pёr soliste mezzo soprano dhe orkestёr

-"Athinaja, Korifeja dhe kori i Eumenideve", dhe orkhestra

-"Athinaja, Oresti dhe kori i Eumenideve" dhe orkestra

-"Korifeja dhe Eumenidet" dhe orchestra

-"Finale, Aeropag"

2001: "Lundërtarët e vjetër", për sop dhe piano. Poezia Arian Leka

2000: "Përjetësia" (Infiniteness), për bariton dhe piano. Poezia nga Lasgush Poradeci.

2000: "Ç'u mbush mali me dëborë" për korr vajzash\miks dhe piano. Poezia nga Lasgush Poradeci.

2000: "Suita" me tema popullore greke, I, II, pёr orkestёr simfonike

2000: "Dikotomi" për kuintet fryme. (Fl, Ob, Cl in b, Horn, Fagot)

1999: "Erë e borzilokut" për soprano, v.ni, v.c dhe piano. Poezia popullore

1999: "A Psalmodie bono", për orkestër harqesh

1999: "Hoax", v.cello solo

1999: Muzika e filmit "Lotët e Kosovës", film dokumentar me regji të Kujtim Çashkut dhe skenar të Vath Koreshit.

1999: Muzika e filmit "Lojë botash", film dokumentar me regji të Pluton Vasit dhe skenar të Fatos Baxhakut.

1998: "Këngëzë" për soprano\tenor dhe piano. Poezia popullore

1997: "Ep-event" për violinë, violë dhe v.cello

1997: "Shatra-Patra" për 3 daulle

1997: "R.I.P"-Rest in Peace, pёr piano

1996: "Trias" për flaut dhe orkestër simfonike

1996: "Genotip" për orkestër të madhe

1996: "Sarajevalium" për bariton dhe piano. Poezia Ervin Hatibi.

1995: "W" in memoriam, për Cl, Violinë, V.Cello, Piano dhe Drum I, II, III

1995: "DdA", kuartet harqesh

1995: "Iso-Gjëma", për 16 zëra vajzash

1994: "Avaz II" për 3 Viola, 5 Violina, 2 Fl, Cl, Drum I, II

1994: "Avaz" për kuartet fagotësh

1994: "88", pёr piano

1994: "Bizantine", për bas dhe piano

1993: "Age of Cage", pёr piano

1993: "Pheromones" për Fl, Cl, V.cello dhe Piano

1993: "Epitaf dhe Britmë", për kuartet harqesh, Fl, Cl, Fagot dhe Piano

1992: "Metamorfozë" për 24 instrumentistë harqesh

1992: "Portret simbolik dhe vdekja e tij", pёr piano

1991: "Rend, rend or Marathonomak"

1991: "Pesë skica" për kuartet harqesh

1990: "Koncert për orkestër"

1990: Suitë me 6 kohë, pёr violinё dhe piano

1990: "Skerco", pёr cl in b dhe piano

1989: "Kontrast", variacion simfonik

1989: "Kosova", për bas dhe piano. Poezia Ali Podrimja

1989: "As më ngre shaminë", kёngё, kompleksi i djemve Përmet. Regjistruar nga RTSH.

1988: "Dallëndyshe e parë", kёngё, me poezi të Fatos Arapit. Anketa muzikore e Radio-Tiranës.

1988: "Vajtim" për vcello e piano (përshtatur nga suita për violinë e piano)

1988: "Gazmore" për vcello e piano (përshtatur nga suita për violinë e piano)

1988: "Rondo" për orkestër harqesh

1988: "Rondo", pёr piano

1988: Sonatë me 3 kohë, pёr violinë dhe piano

1987: "Poemë simfonike"

1987: "Këngët e Jutbinës". Cikël romancash për bariton, tenor dhe piano. Poezitë popullore

1986: "Suitë" me 4 kohë, pёr orkestёr simfonike

-Veprat muzikore në CD:

2007: "Eumenides", opera, publikuar në Angli.

1998: Tek C.D-"Sazet…", vepra "Epitaf dhe britmë" për ansambël, nr. 22. Publikuar nga TEKNOTRADE. Tiranë 1998.

1997: Tek C.D-"Memus disco 2", vepra "Trias" për flaut dhe orkestër, nr.4, CD/2. Publikuar nga Regione Siciliana, Itali.
