= Ison (music) =

Drone note in Byzantine chant

Ison is a drone note, or a slow-moving lower vocal part, used in Byzantine chant and some related musical traditions to accompany the melody, thus enriching the singing. It was not considered to transform it into a harmonized or polyphonic piece.

== History ==
It is widely believed that ison was first introduced in Byzantine practice in the 16th century. It stresses or supports the melody. Before that Greek church chanting was purely monophonic (as it still remains in some more archaic traditions, such as Kyiv's Znamenny chant). The drone practice may have been borrowed from the West, namely from Italy. Traditionally the ison was not notated (see below). The first example of notated ison was not documented until 1847, and the practice of notating the ison did not become widespread for 100 years, or only in the second half of the 20th century.

There is some evidence for a use of a second "auxiliary" ison in Patriarchal chanting practice, that would be pitched on a different tone (usually a fourth or a fifth from the main ison, in a different tetrachord, but in some cases maybe even a third), and sung more discreetly, at the same time still effectively introducing the third independent tone in the chant. Simon Karas is known to be interested in a double-ison technique, and he tried to reconstruct how it could sound like in the older 15th- 16th-century practices, when there appeared indeed some first attempts to create a "Native Byzantine alternative to Western polyphony".

The mobility of ison seems to gradually increase with time, with modern ison lines being much more mobile than those known from the end of the 19th century. The main reason for this gradual change obviously lies in the influence of Western music over Byzantine chanting practices. Some chanters however tend to emphasize the influence of Simon Karas, who was a supporter of much more mobile ison.

Chanters holding the ison were (and are) called isokratima (ισοκράτημα) in Greek.

== Modern use in Byzantine chant ==
The use of ison in Byzantine chant is relatively flexible, so the same piece can be performed with isons of various mobility—starting from a stable drone on one note for a whole piece, and up to a more mobile lower tone, changing at least once within each musical phrase. Still ison is never as mobile as the melody, and does not introduce counterpoint in the performance, but rather stresses the melody by introducing a base to pitch stressed or consonant (just) intervals against it.

The main logic of ison is the following:

- for each Byzantine tone it has a main stable note (such as D for the 1st tone, G for the 2nd, F for the 3d etc.)
- whenever a melody transposes to a different tetrachord, the ison is likely to jump to the base note of this tetrachord, either up or down
- whenever a melody goes below the ison for a short time, the ison is likely to follow it down and then back up to the stable note, in order not to be above the melody (which is usually, but not always, undesirable)
- in some modes the ison performs phrasing of cadences, following the internal logic of the tone (such as the D-C-D cadence in the Plagal 1st tone, or the G-E interchanging phrasing of the 2nd tone)

However, as it was noted above, for the majority of compositions a stable ison staying on the main stable note of the tone would usually work as well. With this in mind, in most traditional Byzantine scores prior to the mid-20th century the ison was not even notated, as it was assumed that to perform it is just too simple to bother to fix it in writing.

For really quick, as well as for extremely slow and ornamental pieces the ison is usually sung without words, just as a kind of "humming", while for the majority of pieces performed in normal tempo the words are supposed to be produced in synchrony with the melody. There is also an "intermediate" approach, when the ison follows the vowels of the text, but not the consonants. The ison is also supposed to be held across the gaps between the phrases, when the leading chanters, singing the melody, catch their breath.

== Modern use in other traditions ==
Apart from Byzantine chant, ison is also used in some Russian traditions, such as Valaam chant. Recently, under the influence of Byzantine chant, Znamenny chant also tends to be performed with the ison. This innovation is rather controversial however, as Znamenny chant follows different musical logic than the Byzantine chant, is less ornamental and mobile on its own, and also does not use different scales for different tones. With ison introduced, Znamenny chant tends sometimes to sound rather dull, and the chants of different tones become more similar, which is not always a desirable effect. Ison is also used in Bulgarian and Serbian chant.
