= Studia Albanica =

- Discipline: Area studies
- Language: English, French, Italian, Russian
- Edited by: Seit Mansaku

Publication details
- History: 1964-present
- Publisher: Academy of Sciences of Albania (Albania)
- Frequency: Biannual

Standard abbreviations
- ISO 4: Stud. Albanica

Indexing
- ISSN: 0585-5047
- OCLC no.: 1996482

Studia Albanica is a biannual scientific journal published by the Social and Albanological Studies Section of the Academy of Sciences of Albania. It was established in 1964. It covers Albanology, including studies on the Albanian language and literature, and history. The articles are published in their original language, although French is used by its editorial staff. The editor-in-chief is Seit Mansaku.

== See also ==
- Centre of Albanological Studies
- Gjurmime Albanologjike
- List of magazines in Albania
