= Troja (band) =

Kosovar Albanian heavy metal band

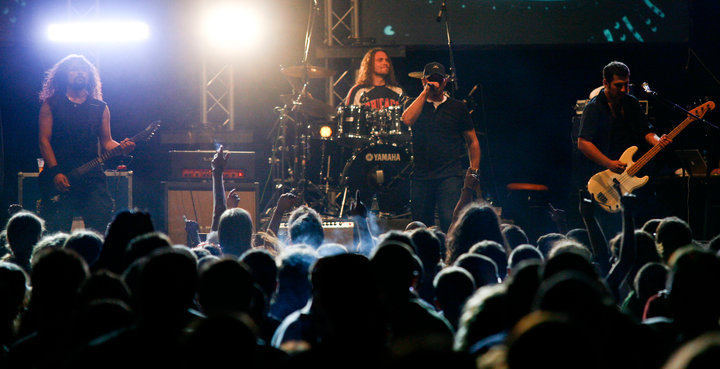
- Troja during a live performance in Prishtina, Kosovo

Background information
- Origin: Pristina, Kosovo
- Genres: Heavy metal, thrash metal, hard rock
- Years active: 1990–2020
- Members: Bujar Berisha; Florent Bajrami; Violand Shabani; Agron Ejupi
- Website: Official homepage

Troja is a Kosovar heavy metal band which consists of Bujar Berisha (vocals), Florent Bajrami (guitar), Violand Shabani (drums) and Agron Ejupi (bass). The band was originally formed by Ismajl (Mak) Beqaj (bass guitar) and Tomorr (Toma) Arifi (vocals) in 1990 in Pristina, SFR Yugoslavia. The same year Florent Bajrami (guitar) and Visar Blaku (drums) joined the band. Florent Bajrami remains the only original member of the band.

== Band history ==
The band was founded in 1990. Before they recorded their first album called People the band produced their first songs "Ekzistenca" (Existence) and "Për Bekin" (For Beki) at the Enis Presheva studio. The recording for their first album, "People", started in 1997 but the album was not published until 2003. In the mid-90s Beqaj and Blaku departed from the band and were replaced by Agron Ejupi on bass guitar and Bujar Berisha on drums. In 2006 singer Tomorr Arifi left the band and drummer Bujar Berisha took on vocal duties. Bujar was replaced on the drums by Violand (Land) Shabani. In 2009 they produced their second studio album Amaneti - I Clown It. In 1994 the band won the best rock band award at the Boom Festival. The video People was awarded for the best Albanian rock video in 2003 and best camera direction. In 2007 they were participants in "SubKultura Urbane" which was broadcast live at the Reception Room in Pristina. In 2009 they recorded a new video called Amaneti i Clown-it which was awarded for the best video at Top Fest in Tirana, Albania and was also the winner of the Best Video award.

== Appearances & Awards ==
- 1994 = Best Rock band
- 1993 = Concert in theater - DODONA - 1993 - Concert in Kosovska Mitrovica
- 1993 = Rock Fest - Pejë
- 1993 = Rock Fest - Shkup
- 1994 = Boom Festival - 1st place (night of the rock music)
- 1995 = Recording songs - Ekzistenca - Për Bekin - Kosovska Mitrovica
- 1997 = Show Fest.
- 1997 = ODA band concert (Casablanca).
- 1997 = Recording two songs in Pejë.
- 2002 = First Album recorded - PEOPLE
- 2003 = First Video, a song called with the same name - PEOPLE
- 2003 = Music video People: Best Albanian rock video and best camera direction
- 2003 = Winner of the Best Camera - Music Video Award - Prishtina.
- 2003 = Winner of the best Directing on "Netët e Video Klipit Shqiptar" - Tirana Albania.
- 2004 = Participant in TOP FEST - Tirana - Albania with the song called "Jena Na".
- 2006 = TROJA's big concert - with 2500 people!
- 2007 = Video of the song called "Nuk Po Muj Ma".
- 2007 = Opening for the BTR band from Bulgary in Prizren.
- 2007 = SubKultura Urbane, Live in Reception Room.
- 2009 = New Album (Amaneti I Clown-it & the Video).
- 2009 = TROJA - Amaneti i Clown-it "WINNER OF THE BEST VIDEO" - TOP FEST TIRANA - ALBANIA.
- 2009 - TROJA - Amaneti I Clown-it "Winner of the Best Group, Best Rock & the Public Price" Video Music Award in Prishtina - Kosovo.
- 2010 = Winner of BEST GROUP Award in Top Fest 7th edition in Albania.
- 2010 = LIVE Concert Pristina.
- 2010 = New video "Mretnesha Kohe"

== Discography ==
=== Albums ===
- People (full-length 2003)
- Amaneti - I "Clown" It (full-length 2009)
- One (2015)

=== Videos ===
- People (2003)
- Jena Na (2006)
- Nuk Po Muj Ma (2007)
- Amaneti i Clown-it (2009)
- Mbretnesha kohe (2010)
- Demokraci (2015)
