= Prize of the Republic =

State prize of the People's Socialist Republic of Albania

- Prize of the Republic badge (1st class)
- Native name: Çmimi i Republikës
- Type: State prize
- Awarded for: Outstanding works in science, inventions, rationalizations, literature and the arts.
- Country: People's Socialist Republic of Albania
- Presented by: Council of Ministers
- Eligibility: Authors and groups of authors
- Status: Discontinued
- Established: 27 September 1951
- Prize ribbon

The Prize of the Republic (Albanian: Çmimi i Republikës) was a state prize of the People's Socialist Republic of Albania, awarded for outstanding achievements in science, technology, literature and the arts. It was conferred on individual authors or groups of authors whose works were considered to have made a significant contribution in such fields.

Recipients were presented with a diploma and a corresponding badge of honor.

== History ==
The Prize of the Republic was instituted on 27 September 1951 by the Presidium of the People's Assembly. Its original legal framework remained in effect until it was repealed by Decree No. 4614 of 12 December 1969, "Mbi Çmimet e Republikës", further ammended on 29 June 1981.

Under the 1969 decree, the prize recognized distinguished scientific works, inventions and rationalizations that contributed to technological and economic advancement, along with notable achievements in literature and the arts. It could be conferred on either an individual or a group of authors, with recipients receiving a diploma and a corresponding badge of honor.

The prize was administered by the Prizes Committee, under the direct subordination of the Council of Ministers and was divided into three classes. Nominations of the candidates were submitted by ministries and other central institutions after the works had been discussed by the relevant workers's collective or evaluated by the working class.

== Insignia ==
The insignia consisted of a circular medal displaying the state emblem in relief on the obverse. The reverse bore the four-line inscription Fitonjës i Çmimit të Republikës ("Winner of the Prize of the Republic"), along with the class of the award.

The First Class medal was made of gold, the Second Class of silver with a gilded bas-relief and the Third Class of bronze with a silver-plated bas-relief.

== Notable recipients ==
The list of recipients is based on Decree no. 274 of 17 November 1984, published in newspaper Zëri i Popullit:

=== First Class ===
Recipient	Awarded for
Abdurrahim Buza	Painting cycle Me pushkë dhe flamur
Alaudin Kodra	Co-author of the geological map of Albania
Alfred Uçi	Mitologjia, folklori, letërsia
Sandër Prosi	Portrayal of Ismail Qemali in the film Nëntori i Dytë
Androkli Kostallari	Director, editor-in-chief and contributor to Fjalori i gjuhës së sotme shqipe
Bashkim Baholli	Co-author of a study and experimental method for producing steel without the use of coke
Dhimitër Anagnosti	Direction of the film Kujtime nga Gjirokastra
Dhimitër Shuteriqi	Monograph Naim Frashëri
Eqrem Çabej	Studime etimologjike në fushë të shqipes (posthumously)
Ferid Stërmasi	Structural design of Hotel Tirana (posthumously)
Gaqo Dhimo	Study, design and implementation of cold self-hardening moulding-sand technology
Hasan Bakia	Co-author of the geological map of Albania
Ilir Hoxha	Co-author of a study and experimental method for producing steel without the use of coke
Kadri Gjata	Co-author of the geological map of Albania
Mane Alikaj	Design and implementation of long-distance electrical transmission using a new type of underwater cable
Minella Shallo	Co-author of the geological map of Albania
Muntaz Dhrami	Sculpture Monumenti i Drashovicës
Pirro Vaso	Co-author of the architectural and functional design of the Skanderbeg Museum
Pranvera Hoxha	Co-author of the architectural and functional design of the Skanderbeg Museum
Rexhep Shehu	Co-author of the geological map of Albania
Sotir Madhi	Co-author of the study Psikologjia shoqërore e pronës dhe e punës
Spiro Dede	Screenplay of the film Enver Hoxha tungjatjeta
Shkëlqim Zotkaj	Design and construction of a complex of buildings
Viktor Gjika	Direction of the film Enver Hoxha tungjatjeta

=== Second Class ===
Recipient	Awarded for
Abedin Xhomo	Co-author of the geological map of Albania
Albana Sulejmani	Portrayal of Shota in the ballet Shota e Azem Galica
Aleksandër Çina	Co-author of the geological exploration project for the "16 Tetori" chromium deposit
Aleksandër Vranaj	Co-author of the geological map of Albania
Anastas Kondo	Short-story collection Pse e vranë Odisenë
Aristotel Pano	Probleme të teorisë së metodologjisë dhe të analizës së të ardhurave kombëtare të RPSSH
Bajram Mejdia	Co-author of the study Psikologjia shoqërore e pronës dhe e punës
Bashkim Jahja	Co-author of the geological exploration project for the "16 Tetori" chromium deposit
Besnik Balla	Co-author of the geological exploration project for the "16 Tetori" chromium deposit
Besnik Kapo	Co-author in the study, experimentation and production of a radio station
Çesk Zadeja	Music of the ballet Para stuhisë
Dhimitër Samara	Co-author in the compilation and editing of Fjalori i gjuhës së sotme shqipe
Dhori Bibolli	Study, design and establishment of a sector for drawing and rolling steel rods and strips
Fadil Kraja	Drama Baca i Gjetajve
Fadil Llubani	Co-author of the study and establishment of the Krastë–Krujë–Milot pine forest
Fuat Dushku	Sculpture Shtatorja e Bajram Currit
Gëzim Bakiu	Design and construction of a complex of buildings
Hamit Beqja	Problemi i edukatës socialiste dhe shkolla
Ilia Pali	Co-author of the study and technological plans for poultry complexes producing eggs and chicken meat
Ismet Elezi	E drejta zakonore penale e shqiptarëve
Ilir Kërni	Portrayal of Azem in the ballet Shota e Azem Galica
Jani Thomai	Co-author in the compilation and editing of Fjalori i gjuhës së sotme shqipe
Johan Furxhi	Co-author in the study, design, experimentation and production of a radio station
Koço Kosta	Short-story collection Era e udhëve
Kujtim Meka	Structural solution of the National History Museum
Lirim Hoxha	Geological exploration project of the abandoned copper deposit at Rubik
Mehmet Zaçe	Co-author of the geological exploration project for the copper deposit at Perlat
Myftar Mataj	Study, design and implementation of technology for rapid horizontal mining works
Naum Guxho	Co-author of the study Psikologjia shoqërore e pronës dhe e punës
Sali Shijaku	Painting Zjarre partizane
Sefedin Qorlaze	Co-author of the geological exploration project for the "16 Tetori" chromium deposit
Sefedin Shabani	Co-author of the geological exploration project for the "16 Tetori" chromium deposit
Selim Çela	Study, design and introduction into production of a new mechanical-industry product
Skënder Gozhita	Development of several new high-yield wheat cultivars
Skënder Kada	Co-author of the study, design and implementation of production technology for a new mechanical-industry product
Sokrat Mosko	Architectural design of the National History Museum
Valentina Pistoli	Architectural design of Hotel Tirana
Valter Meçe	Co-author in the study, design, experimentation and production of a radio station
Vangjel Meçe	Co-author of the geological map of Albania
Vangjel Prifti	Study, design and establishment of production lines for spare parts for the textile industry
Vasillaq Kureta	Co-author of the study Psikologjia shoqërore e pronës dhe e punës
Viktor Doda	Co-author of the geological exploration project for the copper deposit at Perlat
Viktor Puka	Co-author of the study and technological plans for poultry complexes producing eggs and chicken meat
Viron Kola	Study, experimentation and industrial production of a product in the field of chemistry
Vladimir Misja	Baza materialo-teknike dhe efektiviteti i investimeve në industri
Xhevat Lloshi	Co-author in the compilation and editing of Fjalori i gjuhës së sotme shqipe

=== Third Class ===
Prize of the Republic badge, 3rd class.

Recipient	Awarded for
Alfred Melkaj	Co-author of the study, design and technological solution for removing chromium from pig iron produced exclusively from domestic ore
Alqi Spahiu	Co-author of the study, design and production of equipment for forming large steel components
Daut Yzeiri	Co-author of the geological map of Albania
Enver Faja	Architectural design of the National History Museum
Frederik Myteberi	Co-author of the study, design and production of equipment for forming large steel components
Gaqo Bushaka	Novels Çufoja dhe bubi kaçurrel and Pushimet e Çufos
Gazmend Leka	Direction and design of the animated film Dy gostitë
Ilir Antoni	Co-author of the study, design and implementation of production technology for a new mechanical-industry product
Iljaz Fishta	Co-author of Ekonomia e Shqipërisë në vitet e para të ndërtimit socialist 1944–1948
Liko Ismaili	Design and production of components for electric ferrochrome furnaces
Man Gjongecaj	Technical and technological improvements in ferrochrome production
Mentor Sula	Co-author of the study, design and technological solution for removing chromium from pig iron produced exclusively from domestic ore
Muharrem Loka	Co-author of the study and establishment of the Krastë–Krujë–Milot pine forest
Nasi Lera	Short-story collection Duaje emrin tënd
Naxhi Bakalli	Mural Bashkimi dhe përballimi
Petraq Kolevica	Architectural design of the National History Museum
Qazim Duhanxhiu	Co-author of the study, design and technological solution for removing chromium from pig iron produced exclusively from domestic ore
Selami Pulaha	Popullsia shqiptare e Kosovës gjatë shekujve XV–XVI
Sulejman Krasniqi	Novel Mic Sokoli
Shefik Osmani	Fjalori i pedagogjisë
Teodor Laço	Short-story collection Portat e dashurisë
Thanas Gjata	Co-author of the geological map of Albania
Vath Koreshi	Novella Dasma e Sakos
Veniamin Toçi	Co-author of Ekonomia e Shqipërisë në vitet e para të ndërtimit socialist 1944–1948
Xhevat Shima	Development of several new high-yield wheat cultivars
Xhoxhi Mita	Technical execution of the construction of the National History Museum, particularly its large-span roofing
Zija Çela	Short-story collection Buletini i borës

== See also ==
- Orders, decorations, and medals of Albania
