= Ballad of Kurbin =

1989 film by Kujtim Çashku

- Directed by: Kujtim Çashku
- Written by: Vath Koreshi
- Starring: Reshat Arbana; Timo Flloko
- Edited by: Shazie Kapoli
- Release date: 1989
- Country: Albania
- Language: Albanian

Ballad of Kurbin (original title Balada e Kurbinit) is a 1989 Albanian historical romantic drama film directed by Kujtim Çashku and written by Vath Koreshi. It is based on the 1987 novel Ballad of Kurbin by Vath Koreshi The film stars Reshat Arbana, Ndrek Luca, Xhevdet Ferri, and Besa Imami.

An analogue for Enver Hoxha and his policies, the film is set in Albania during its time under the control of the Ottoman Empire. It was one of the last films made before the fall of communism in Albania.

== Plot ==
In the 18th century, the Ottoman Empire controls Albania. A pasha is informed of an upcoming coup d'état and has thirteen men killed to prevent it. An Albanian man goes to become a mercenary and the pasha attempts to take his lover. His lover waits for him to return, but decides to marry another man. However, her husband returns.

== Cast ==
- Reshat Arbana as Kuke Memini
- Ndrek Luca as Vuhan Pasha
- Xhevdet Ferri as Agron Kodra

Besa Imami

== Production ==
Ballad of Kurbin is a film adaption of Vath Koreshi's 1987 novel of the same name. Kujtim Çashku was the director of the film and made it an analogy of Enver Hoxha. Hoxha's isolationist policies are conveyed in the film as the pasha prohibits a painter from coming to the area and the overthrowing of the pasha is meant to represent the declining power of the communist governments in eastern Europe. Ballad of Kurbin started production in 1987, and was one of the last films made before the fall of communism in Albania. Another film by Çashku, Kolonel Bunker, is also critical of Hoxha.

== Release ==
Ballad of Kurbin was released in Albania in 1989. It was also distributed in France and Germany.

== Works cited ==
- Cornell, Katharine (1993). "After the Wall: Eastern European Cinema Since 1989". Cinéaste. Vol. 19, no. 4. Cineaste Publishers.
- Passa, Matilde (6 September 1991). "La ballata degli albanesi". l'Unità. p. 19.
- Segel, Harold (2003). The Columbia Guide to the Literatures of Eastern Europe Since 1945. Columbia University Press. ISBN 0231114044.
- Taylor, Richard; Wood, Nancy; Graffy, Julian; Iordanova, Dina, eds. (2000). The BFI Companion to Eastern European and Russian Cinema. British Film Institute. ISBN 0851707521.
