= Face to Face (1979 film) =

- Directed by: Kujtim Çashku
- Written by: Ismail Kadare
- Produced by: Haxhi Dersha
- Starring: Katerina Biga; Rajmonda Bullku; Kadri Roshi
- Cinematography: Ilia Terpini
- Edited by: Krisanthi Kotmilo
- Music by: Feim Ibrahimi
- Release date: November 7, 1979
- Running time: 113 minutes
- Country: Albania
- Language: Albanian

Face to Face (Albanian: Ballë për Ballë) is a 1979 Albanian drama film directed by Piro Milkani and Kujtim Çashku. The film is based on a novel by Albanian author Ismail Kadare.

== Plot ==
A translator at the conference of communist parties witnessed the biggest break between the two communist parties. The dramatic events in the military conflict take place on a naval base in Albania, which the Soviets did not dare to adopt.

== Cast ==
- Katerina Biga as Jelena Graçova
- Rajmonda Bulku as Zana
- Thimi Filipi as Xhemal Struga
- Timo Flloko as Inxhinier Sergej
- Arben Imami as Arben Struga
- Bujar Lako as Mujo Bermema
- Sulejman Pitarka as Shelenvi
- Kadri Roshi as Belul Gjinomadhi
- Mevlan Shanaj as Besniku
- Agim Shuke as Komisari i flotës
- Stavri Shkurti as Shefi i arkeologjisë
- Ilir Bozo as Ushtari rus i plagosur në nëndetë
- Lola Gjoka as Plaka Nurihan
