= The General Gramophone =

1979 film by Viktor Gjika

The Gramophone General
- Directed by: Viktor Gjika
- Written by: Vath Koreshi
- Starring: Bujar Lako
- Cinematography: Pëllumb Kallfa
- Edited by: Atalanda Pasko
- Music by: Aleksandër Peçi
- Production company: Kinostudio
- Release date: 11 February 1979
- Running time: 104 minutes
- Country: Albania
- Language: Albanian

The Gramophone General (Albanian: Gjeneral Gramafoni) is a 1979 Albanian drama film directed and written by Vath Koreshi. The soundtrack by Aleksandër Peçi was recorded by Remzi Lela and Mentor Xhemali. A 4K resolution restoration was released in 2023.

== Plot ==
In the mid-1930s, the penetration and preparation of the Italian invasion of 1939 began. Halit Berati, a virtuoso clarinetist and Parandili, are invited by an Italian entrepreneur to record in gramophone plates, their tunes which will be sold together with Italian music the time of fascism. During this time the strikes of oil workers begin where Halit Berati is a worker.

== Cast ==
- Bujar Lako - Halit Berati
- Guljelm Radoja - Mr. Alberto
- Kadri Roshi - Parandil
- Sulejman Pitarka - Avdi
- Reshat Arbana - mayor
- Sheri Mita - Michele
- Stavri Shkurti - Braho

== Production ==
The General Gramophone was directed by Viktor Gjika and written by Vath Koreshi. Koreshi named the main character Halit after the clarinetist Halit Përmeti. Aleksandër Peçi composed the soundtrack and all of the music was recorded by Remzi Lela and Mentor Xhemali. The costume design was done by Ilia Xhokaxhi and Atalanda Pasko edited the film.

Produced by Kinostudio, shooting was done in Qyteti Stalin, Korçë, and Berat.

The 1970s was a period of Albanian cinema in which the depiction of Italians and Fascist Italy's control of Albania were common. The Azienda Italiana Petroli Albania (AIPA), which Enver Hoxha said "sucked the blood of our economy" is featured in the film. Strikes by the union Puna at the AIPA plant in Kuçovë in 1935 and 1936, are reenacted in the film.

== Release ==
The General Gramophone premiered in Tirana on 11 February 1979, and was released in Turkey. It received the award for best film at the 3rd Albanian Film Festival in April 1979. A 4K resolution restoration by the Central State Film Archive was released in 2023.

== Works cited ==
- "General Gramophone". Central State Film Archive. Archived from the original on 7 April 2025.
- "Filmi "Gjeneral Gramafoni" prodhim i vitit 1978 në proces restaurimi". Gazeta Sot. 11 January 2023. Archived from the original on 7 April 2025.
- "Jepet premiera e filmit të restauruar "Gjeneral Gramafoni"". Shqip. 20 April 2023. Archived from the original on 7 April 2025.
- "Mevlan Shanaj: Regjisori Viktor Gjika me filmin "Gjeneral Gramafoni" i dha Shqipërisë personalitet në imazh". Gazeta Sot. 22 April 2023. Archived from the original on 7 April 2025.
- Bego, Fabio (2022). "The sound of the other: Albanian–Italian relations and Kinostudio films". Studies in Eastern European Cinema. 13 (1). Taylor & Francis: 3–20. doi:10.1080/2040350X.2021.1938396.
- Hoxha, Enver (1990). Enver Hoxha. Vol. 70. 8 Nëntori Publishing House.
- Krautz, Alfred, ed. (1986). International Directory of Cinematographers Set and Costume Designers in Film. Vol. 6. International Federation of Film Archives.
- Tole, Georgi (2010). Inventory of Performers on Albanian Folk Iso-Polyphony. UNESCO Intangible Cultural Heritage Lists.
