= Gulielm Radoja =

Albanian actor (1945–2021)

Gulielm Radoja AM
- Born: 2 July 1945; Shkodër, Albania
- Died: 5 May 2021 (aged 75); Tirana, Albania
- Occupations: Actor, director
- Years active: 1970–2021
- Children: 2

Gulielm Radoja (Albanian: [guliˈɛlm ɾaˈdɔja]; 2 July 1945 – 5 May 2021) was an Albanian actor, who acted both in theatre and in film. Performed over 40 roles, he gain recognition, playing the devoted teacher Petro Nini Luarasi in Kush Vdes ne Këmbë.

== Life and career ==
Radoja was born on 2 July 1945 in Shkodër, Albania. After finishing studies in dramaturgy at the Higher Institute of Arts in Tirana in 1972 he worked as a professional actor at the city theatre of Librazhd. He then worked as an actor and director at the "Bylis" Theatre in Fier and then as an actor at the "Aleksandër Moisiu" Theatre in Durrës. Among his most famous theatre interpretations are Brecht's A Respectable Wedding, Böll's The Clown and Vasilis Theodoropoulos' Trojans.

In addition to his work in theatre, he also left a legacy in cinematography, where he interpreted in over 40 roles from 1970 to 2019. His first role was as a forest engineer in the movie "Gjurma", in 1970. A series of other roles would continue, such as the role of Tenente Gruabardi in the movie "Në fillim të verës" in 1975, Alberto in the film "The General Gramophone" in 1977, Stefan Bardhi in the film "Mësonjëtorja" in 1979, the role of Petro Nini Luarasi in the film "Kush vdes në këmbë" in 1984, the priest in the film "The Return of the Dead Army" in 1989, the prosecutor in the movie "Kolonel Bunker" in 1998.

Radoja died from COVID-19 complications on 5 May 2021.
