= Pas vdekjes =

- Directed by: Kujtim Çashku
- Written by: Nexhati Tafa
- Starring: Kadri Roshi
- Cinematography: Bashkim Asllani; Vangjush Valla
- Edited by: Marika Vila
- Music by: Sokol Shupo
- Distributed by: Albafilm
- Release date: 1 September 1980
- Running time: 55 minutes
- Country: Albania
- Language: Albanian

Pas vdekjes (English: After death) is a 1980 Albanian black comedy film directed by Kujtim Çashku, based on the comedy of the same name by Andon Zako Çajupi.

== Plot ==
The film takes place in 1908. Some Albanian pseudo-patriots form a club, claiming that they are working for the good of Albania. Each of them has a dream: to be famous and immortal. One of them is Dr. Adhamudhi, a self-proclaimed healer and linguist, who has created a new Albanian alphabet he is waiting to sell to Skëndo Bey, owner of the Thessaloniki Club. Thinking highly of himself, Adhamudhi wants to know what will people say about him after his death. Zeneli, the servant of Skëndo Bey, takes this chance and plays a joke on Adhamudhi's exhausting desire for fame and immortality.

== Cast ==
- Kadri Roshi as Adhamudhi
- Pavlina Mani as Lulushja
- Robert Ndrenika as Zeneli
- Prokop Mima as Musician
- Shpëtim Shmili as Vurko
- Piro Xeci as Uncle Demi
