= Bunkers in Albania =

Concrete bunkers built between the 1960s and 1980s

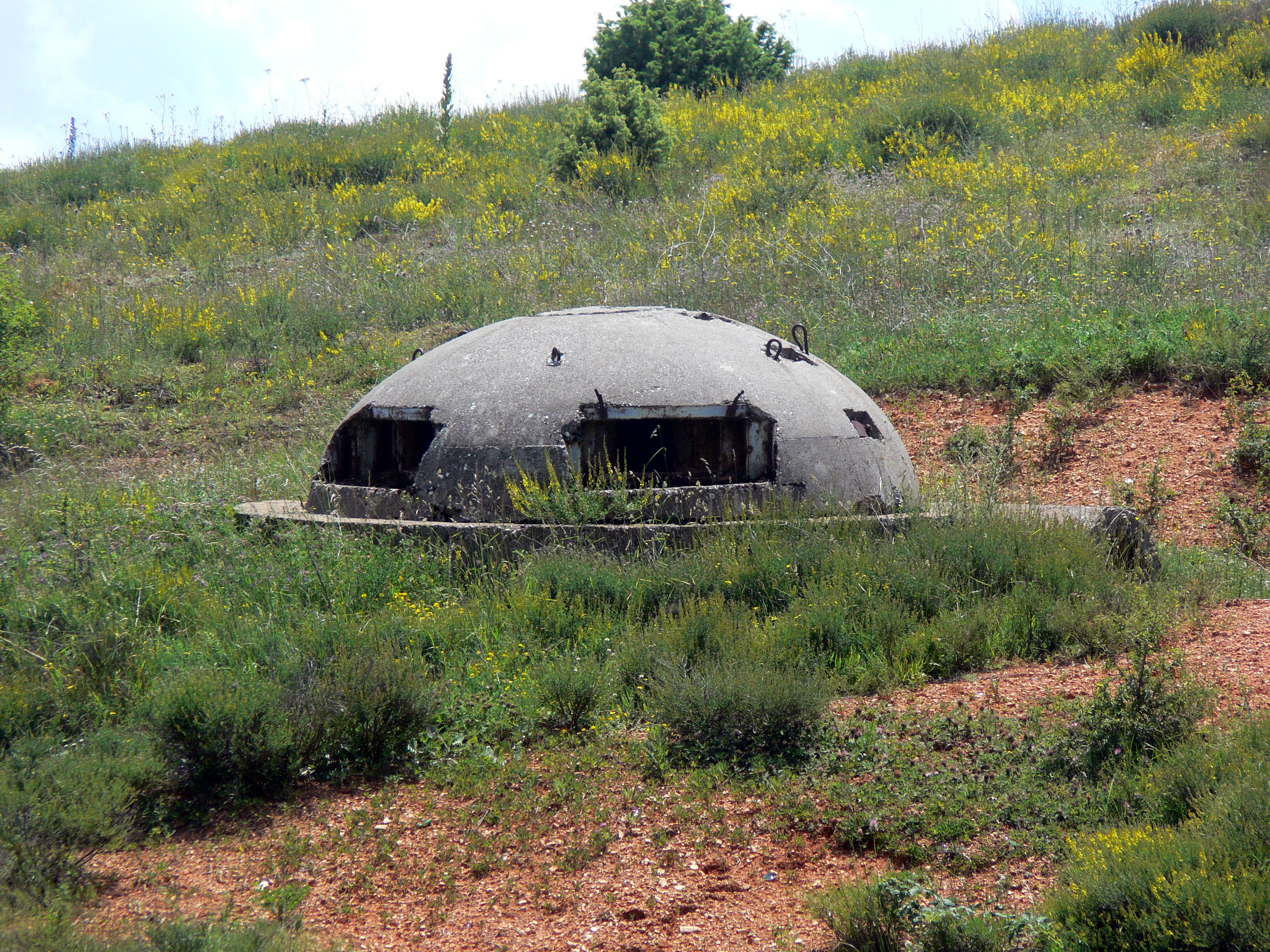
- A Hoxhaist-era bunker near Pogradec, Korçë in 2007

Site information
- Condition: Not in use

Site history
- Built: 1967–1986
- Built by: People's Socialist Republic of Albania
- In use: 1967–1991
- Materials: Concrete, steel
- Demolished: Partly

Concrete military bunkers (Albanian: bunkerët) are a ubiquitous sight in Albania, where more than 170,000 bunkers were built by the Hoxhaist government from the 1960s to the 1980s. This is an average of 5.7 bunkers for every square kilometer.

Hoxha's program of "bunkerization" (bunkerizimi) resulted in the construction of bunkers in every corner of the then-People's Socialist Republic of Albania, ranging from mountain passes to city streets. They were never used for their intended purpose during the years that Hoxha governed. The cost of constructing them was a drain on Albania's resources, diverting them away from dealing with the country's housing shortage and poor roads.

The bunkers were abandoned following the dissolution of the communist government in 1992. A few were used in the Insurrection of 1997 and the Kosovo War of 1999. Most are now derelict, though some have been reused for a variety of purposes, including residential accommodation, cafés, storehouses, and shelters for animals or the homeless.

== Background ==
From the end of World War II to his death in April 1985, Enver Hoxha pursued a style of politics informed by hardline Stalinism as well as elements of Maoism. He broke with the Soviet Union after Nikita Khrushchev embarked on his reformist Khrushchev Thaw, withdrew Albania from the Warsaw Pact in 1968 in protest of the Warsaw Pact invasion of Czechoslovakia, and broke with China after U.S. President Richard Nixon's 1972 visit to China.

His government was also hostile towards the country's immediate neighbours. Albania did not end its state of war with Greece, left over from the Second World War, until as late as 1987 – two years after Hoxha's death – due to Greek territorial ambitions in southern Albania as well as Greece's status as a NATO member state.

Hoxha was virulently hostile towards the government of Josip Broz Tito in Yugoslavia, accusing Tito's government of maintaining "an anti-Marxist and chauvinistic attitude towards our Party, our State, and our people". He asserted that Tito intended to take over Albania and make it into the seventh republic of Yugoslavia and castigated the Yugoslav government's treatment of ethnic Albanians in Kosovo, claiming that "Yugoslav leaders are pursuing a policy of extermination there."

Albania still maintained some links with the outside world at this time, trading with neutral countries such as Austria and Sweden and establishing links across the Adriatic Sea with its former invader Italy. However, a modest relaxation of domestic controls was curtailed by Hoxha in 1973 with a renewed wave of repression and purges directed against individuals, the young and the military, whom he feared might threaten his hold on the country. A new constitution was introduced in 1976 that increased the Labor Party's control of the country, limited private property, and forbade foreign loans. The country sank into a decade of isolation and economic stagnation, virtually cut off from the outside world.

== Military doctrine ==
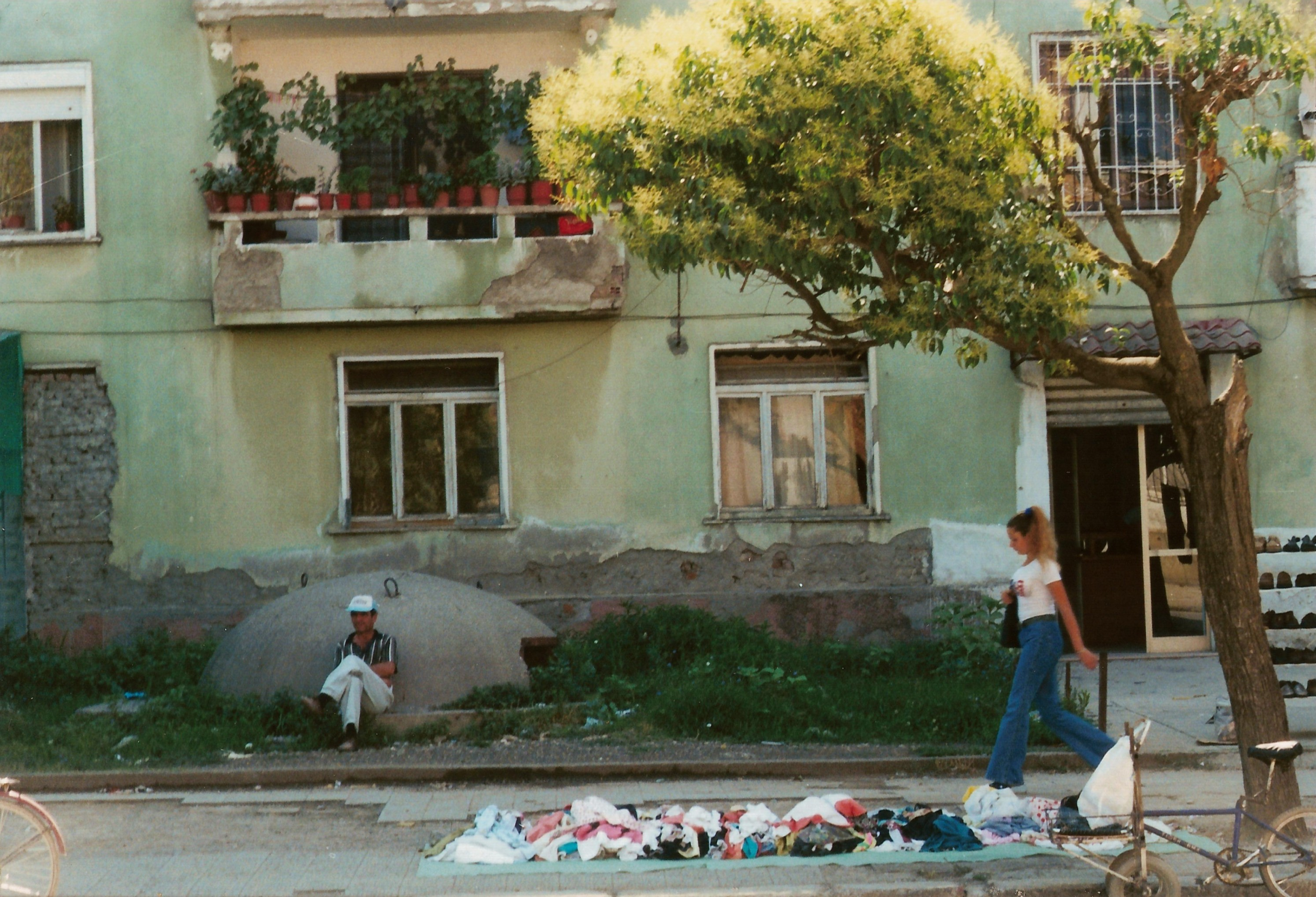
A bunker on a city street in Shkodër. The street's inhabitants would have been expected to defend it.

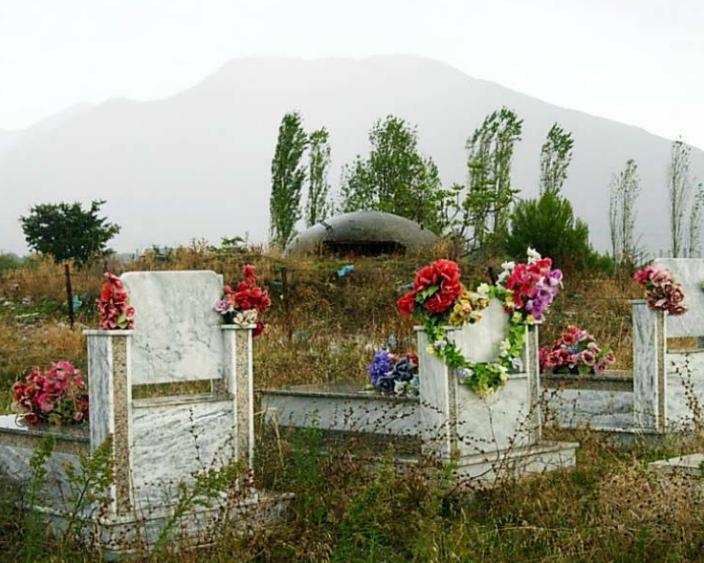
A bunker in a cemetery.

Starting in 1967 and continuing until 1986, the Albanian government carried out a policy of "bunkerisation" that saw the construction of hundreds of thousands of bunkers across the country. They were built in every possible location, ranging from "beaches and mountains, in vineyards and pastures, in villages and towns, even on the manicured lawns of Albania's best hotel". Hoxha envisaged Albania fighting a two-front war against an attack mounted by Yugoslavia, NATO or the Warsaw Pact, involving a simultaneous incursion by up to eleven enemy airborne divisions. As he put it, "If we slackened our vigilance even for a moment or toned down our struggle against our enemies in the least, they would strike immediately like the snake that bites you and injects its poison before you are aware of it."

Albania's military doctrine was based on a concept of "people's war", drawing on the experience of the Albanian resistance during World War II, which Hoxha had led. The Partisans' victory was mythologized on a massive scale by the Hoxha regime, which used its wartime successes to legitimise its rule. The Albanian People's Army was based on the Partisan model and built around infantry units; 75 percent of the regular forces and 97 percent of reservists were employed in infantry roles.

Partisan strategy was mountain-based guerrilla warfare, in which they took refuge in the mountains and launched raids into the less defensible lowlands. By contrast, Hoxha aimed to defend Albania's national integrity and sovereignty "at all costs", which necessitated defending the lowlands as well. The bunkers were therefore intended to establish defensive positions across the entirety of the country. Smaller ones were laid out in lines radiating out within sight of a large command bunker, which was permanently staffed. The commanders of the large bunkers would communicate with their superiors by radio and with the occupants of the smaller bunkers by making visual signals that could be seen through slits.

The regime also sought intensively to militarise civilians. 800,000 people out of a population of about three million served in defence in some way, ranging from the regular armed forces and reserves to civil defence and student armed youth units. Many sectors of the government, state-owned businesses and the public service were also given roles in defence, meaning that almost the entire population was brought in one way or another into the scope of state defence planning. From the age of three, Albanians were taught that they had to be "vigilant for the enemy within and without," and propaganda slogans constantly emphasised the need for watchfulness.

Citizens were trained from the age of 12 to station themselves in the nearest bunker to repel invaders. Local Party cells organised families to clean and maintain their local bunkers, and civil defence drills were held at least twice a month, lasting for up to three days, in which civilians of military age of both sexes were issued rifles (but no ammunition).

Members of the Young Pioneers, the Hoxhaist youth movement, were trained to defend against airborne invasion by fixing pointed spikes to treetops to impale descending foreign parachutists. Despite the militarisation of the population, the Albanian defence system was massively inefficient and took little account of the country's real defence needs; training was minimal, fuel and ammunition were scarce, uniforms and equipment were of poor quality, weapons were antiquated and the military lacked a proper command and control system.

== Construction ==
Bunker types in Albania
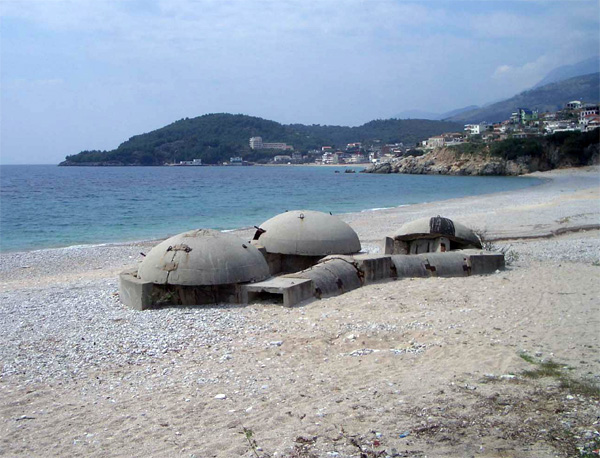
A "triple series" of linked Qender Zjarri bunkers in the coast of Himara, southern Albania

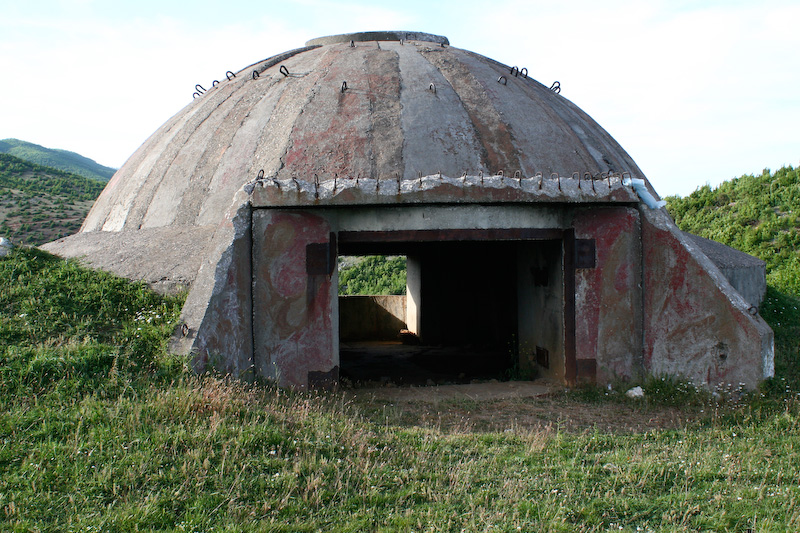
A large Pike Zjarri bunker on the Albania–North Macedonia border

The bunkers were constructed of concrete, steel and iron and ranged in size from one- or two-person pillboxes with gun slits to large underground nuclear bomb shelters intended for use by the Party leadership and bureaucrats. The most common type of bunker is a small concrete dome set into the ground with a circular bottom extending downwards, just large enough for one or two people to stand inside. Known as Qender Zjarri ("firing position") or QZ bunkers, they were prefabricated and transported to their final positions, where they were assembled. They consist of three main elements: a 3 m (9.8 ft) diameter hemispherical concrete dome with a firing slit, a hollow cylinder to support the dome and an outer wall with a radius 60 cm (24 in) larger than the cylinder. The gap between the cylinder and outer wall is filled with earth.

At various places along the coast, large numbers of QZ bunkers were built in groups of three, linked to each other by a prefabricated concrete tunnel. Elsewhere bunkers were constructed in groupings around strategic points across the country, or in lines across swathes of territory. Tirana was particularly heavily defended, with thousands of bunkers radiating out in fifty concentric circles around the city.

The QZ bunker was designed by military engineer Josif Zagali, who served with the Partisans during World War II and trained in the Soviet Union after the war. He observed how dome-shaped fortifications were virtually impervious to artillery fire and bombs, which simply ricocheted off the dome. He used his knowledge to design the subsequently ubiquitous dome-shaped bunkers. Hoxha was initially delighted with the design and had many thousands of Zagali's bunkers constructed.

Zagali himself was promoted to the rank of colonel and became chief engineer of the Albanian Ministry of Defence. However, Hoxha's paranoia led to Zagali being purged in 1974 and imprisoned for eight years on false charges of "sabotage" as a "foreign agent". His wife went insane, his family was shunned by friends and acquaintances, and his daughter died of breast cancer. Zagali later said that it was "a painful and tragic fate not only for me and my family but for thousands and thousands of such families in Albania who have experienced the dictatorship of Enver Hoxha". His experiences were later used as the basis of Kolonel Bunker, a film by Albanian director Kujtim Çashku.

=== Command and control bunkers ===
The command-and-control bunkers, known as Pike Zjarri ("firing point") or PZ bunkers, were also prefabricated and assembled on site. They are far larger and heavier than the QZ bunkers, with a diameter of 8 metres (26 ft). They are made from a series of concrete slices, each weighing eight or nine tons, which were concreted together on site to form an interlocking dome. Fully assembled, they weigh between 350 and 400 tons.

=== Large bunkers and tunnels ===
There was also a third category of larger "special structures" for strategic purposes. The largest were bunker complexes tunnelled into mountains. At Linza near the capital, Tirana, a network of tunnels some 2 kilometres (1.2 mi) long was built to protect members of the Interior Ministry and the Sigurimi (the secret police) from nuclear attack. Elsewhere, thousands of kilometres of tunnels were built to house political, military and industrial assets. Albania is said to have become the most tunnelled country in the world after North Korea. The tunnels were built in conditions of great secrecy. Engineering teams were not allowed to see construction through to completion but were rotated from site to site on a monthly basis.

== Impact ==
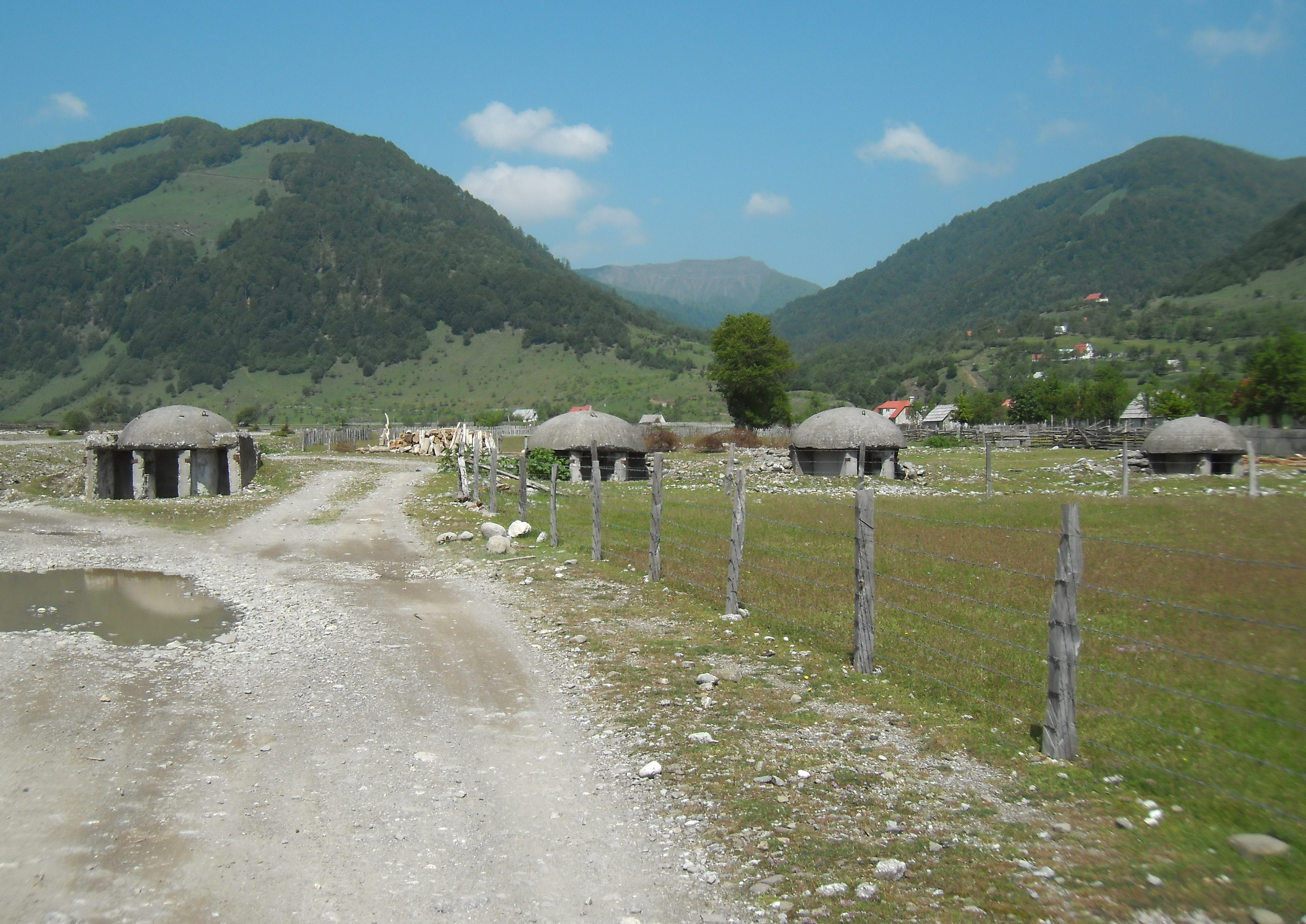
A line of bunkers in a field in Vermosh

The bunkerisation programme was a massive drain on Albania's weak economy. The construction of prefabricated bunkers alone cost an estimated two percent of net material product, and in total the bunkers cost more than twice as much as the Maginot Line in France, consuming three times as much concrete. The programme diverted resources away from other forms of development, such as roads and residential buildings. On average, they are said to have each cost the equivalent of a two-room apartment and the resources used to build them could easily have resolved Albania's chronic shortage of housing. According to Josif Zagali, building twenty Qender Zjarris cost as much as constructing a kilometre of road. It also had a human cost; 70–100 people a year died constructing the bunkers. In addition, the bunkers occupied and obstructed a significant area of arable land.

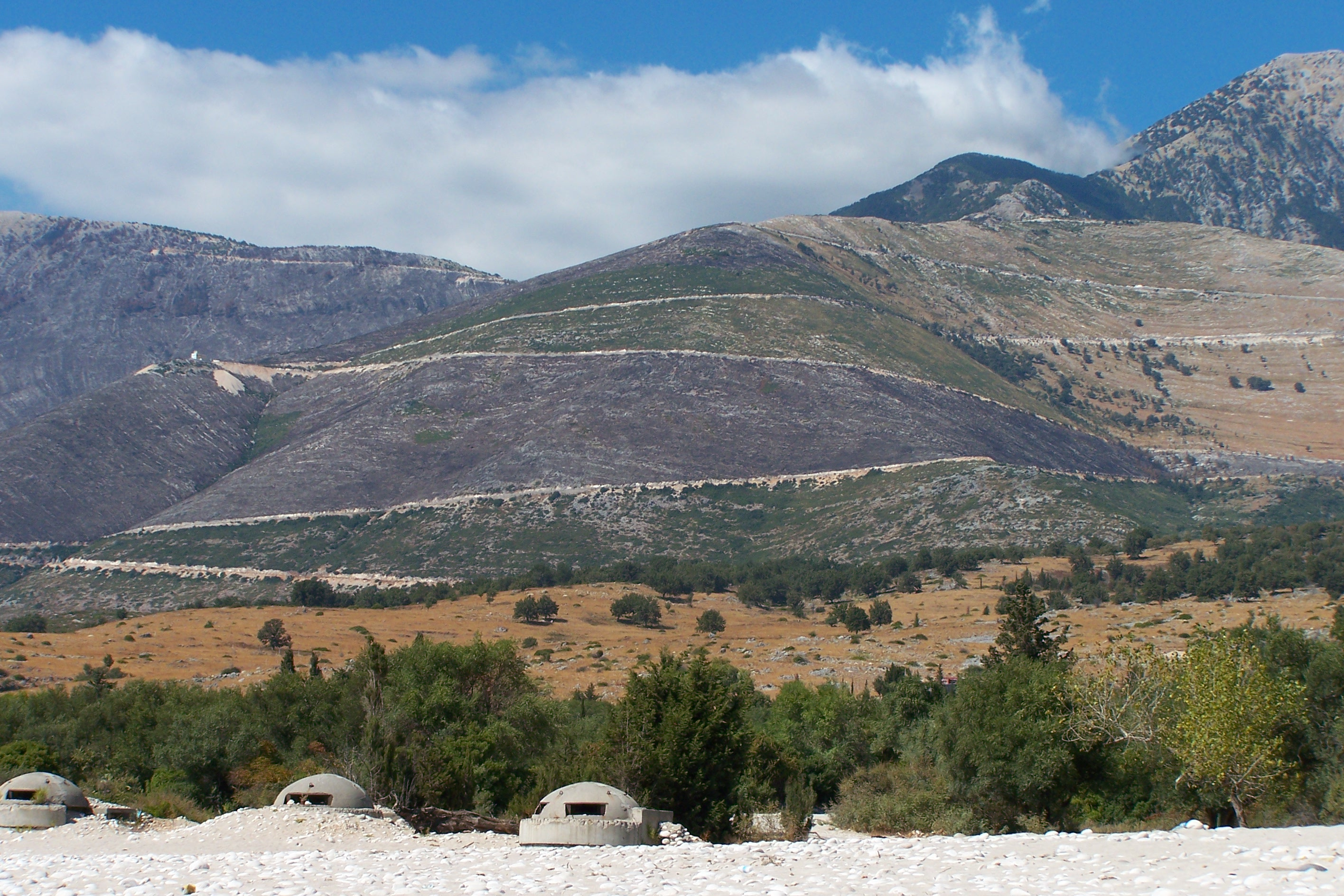
A line of bunkers in Dhërmi, Himara

The bunkerisation of the country had effects that went beyond their ubiquitous physical impact on the landscape. The bunkers were presented by the Party as both a symbol and a practical means of preventing Albania's subjugation by foreign powers, but some viewed them as a concrete expression of Hoxha's policy of isolationism – keeping the outside world at bay. Some Albanians saw them as an oppressive symbol of intimidation and control.

Albanian author Ismail Kadare used the bunkers in his 1996 novel The Pyramid to symbolise the Hoxha regime's brutality and control, while Çashku has characterised the bunkers as "a symbol of totalitarianism" because of the "isolation psychology" that they represented. It has been argued that the bunkerisation programme was a form of "patterned large-scale construction" that "has a disciplinary potential as a means of familiarising a population with a given order of rule".

Hoxha's strategy of "people's war" also caused friction with the Albanian Army. The bunkers had little military value compared with a conventionally equipped and organised professional army. As one commentator has put it, "How long could one man in each bunker hold out? How would you resupply each individual bunker? How would they communicate with each other?" General Beqir Balluku, the Defense Minister and a member of the Politburo, publicly criticised the bunker system in a 1974 speech and disputed Hoxha's line that Albania was under equal threat from the United States and the Soviet Union. He argued that Albania needed a modern, well-equipped professional army rather than a poorly trained and equipped civilian militia. Hoxha responded by having Ballaku arrested, accusing him of being an agent of the Chinese and of working to bring about a military coup. Dubbed "the arch-traitor Ballaku", the general and his associates were convicted and punished according to "the laws of the dictatorship of the proletariat" – meaning that they were executed.

Many other military figures, such as bunker designer Josif Zagali, were also caught up in the 1974 purges. The introduction of a new constitution two years later sealed Hoxha's absolute control of the military by appointing him as Commander-in-Chief of the Albanian People's Army and Chairman of the Defence Council.

== Post-Hoxha ==
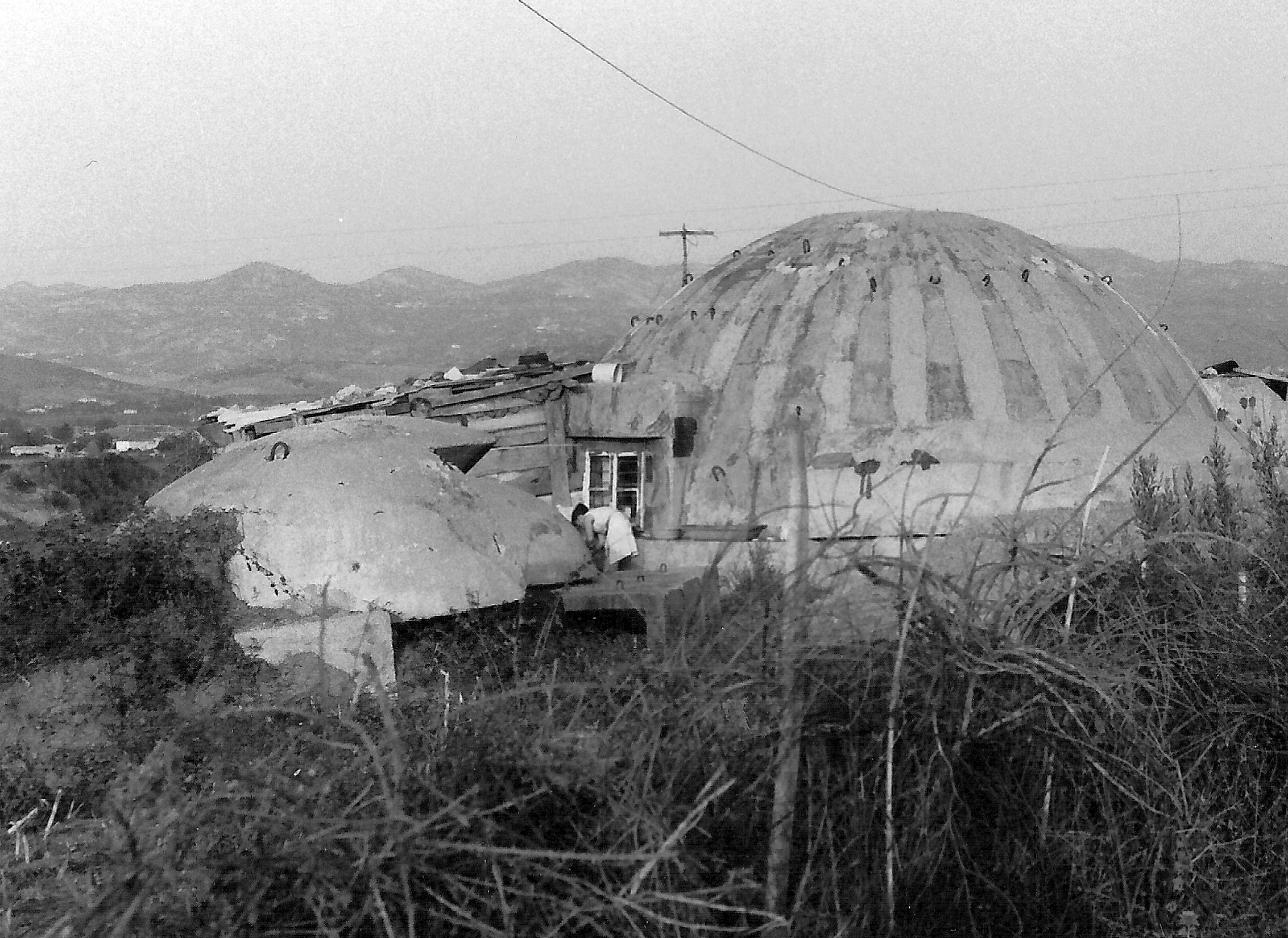
A Pike Zjarri bunker being used as a house in 1994

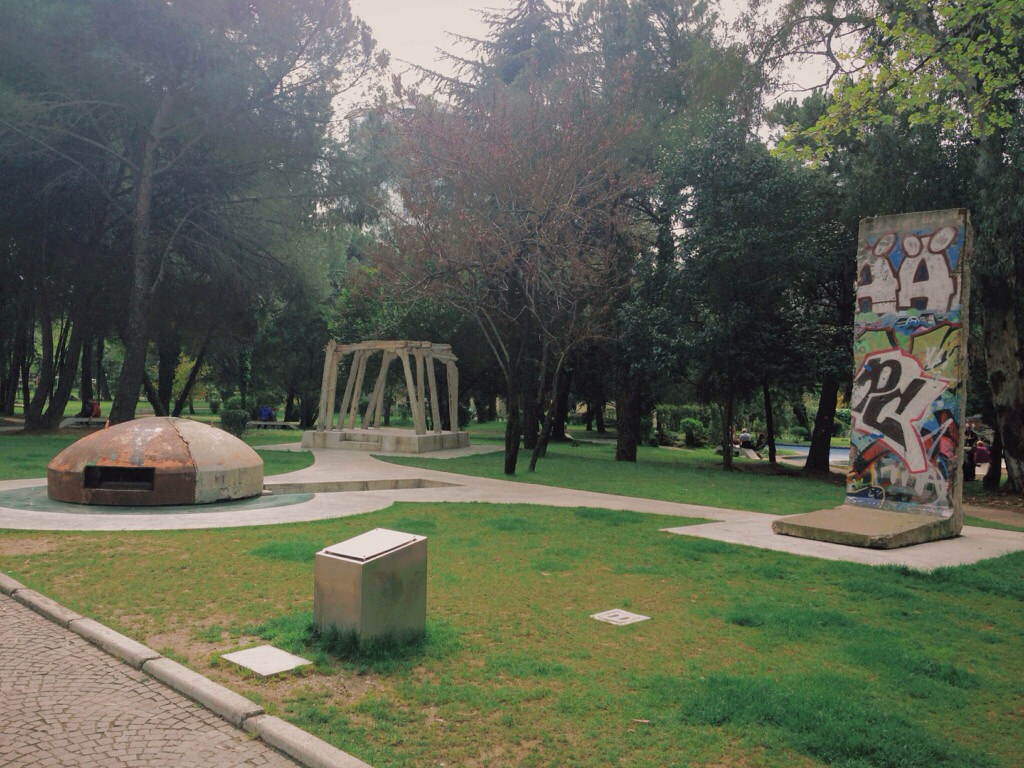
Checkpoint memorial in Tirana near the former secluded area of Blloku. It features a bunker, pillars from Spac prison, and a Berlin Wall fragment.

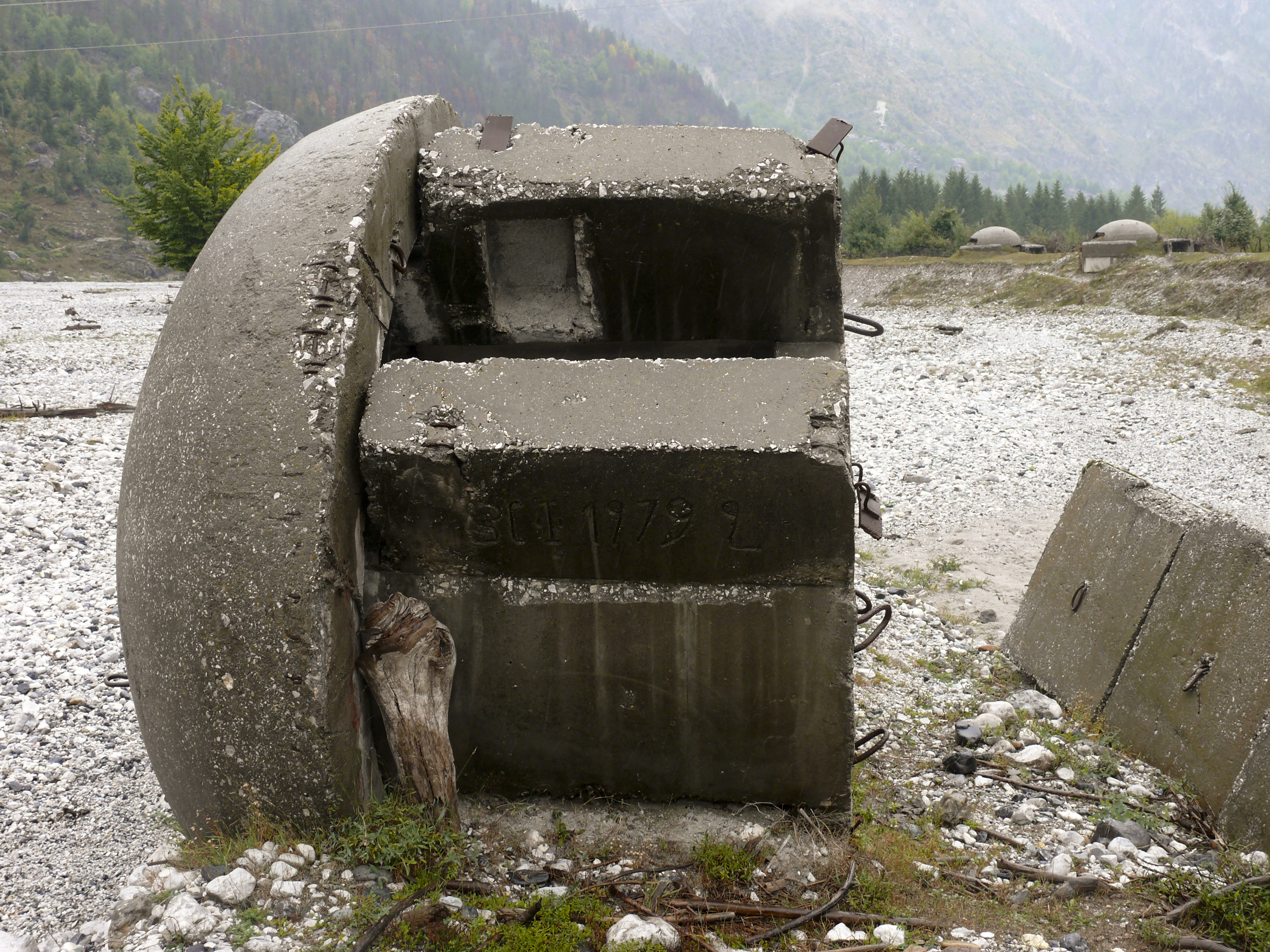
An uprooted bunker in Valbonë, 2009

The bunkerization programme was stopped soon after Hoxha's death in 1985, leaving Albania's towns and countryside dotted with vast numbers of defensive bunkers, with some estimates of more than a half-million bunkers across the country. The bunkers still feature prominently in the Albanian landscape.

A BBC reporter described in 1998 how they were ubiquitous on the road between Tirana and the city's airport, "looking down from every hillside, sprouting out of every bank". The solidity of the bunkers has made removal difficult. Some have been removed, particularly in cities, but in the countryside most bunkers have simply been abandoned. Some have been reused as housing for animals or as storehouses; others have been abandoned to lie derelict due to the cost of removing them.

The extreme secrecy of Hoxha's regime meant that Albania's subsequent governments lacked information on how the bunkers had been used, or even how many had been built. In 2004 Albanian officials discovered a forgotten stockpile of 16 tons of mustard gas and other chemical weapons in an unguarded bunker only 40 kilometres (25 mi) from Tirana. The United States government gave Albania $20 million to destroy the weapons. In other places, abandoned bunkers have become a lethal danger. In 2008 alone, at least five holiday-makers drowned when they were caught in whirlpools created by water currents around bunkers that had subsided into the sea. The Albanian army has carried out bunker removal programmes along the coastline, dragging them out of the ground with modified Type 59 tanks.

Although the bunkers were never used in a real conflict during Hoxha's rule, some found use in conflicts that broke out in the 1990s. During the Albanian insurrection of 1997, the townspeople of Sarandë in southern Albania were reported to have taken up positions in bunkers around the town in the face of fighting between government troops and rebels. After the outbreak of the Kosovo War of 1999, border villages in Albania were repeatedly shelled by Serbian artillery batteries located in nearby Kosovo and local people used the bunkers to shelter from the shelling.

Kosovo Albanian refugees took to using bunkers as temporary shelters until aid agencies could move them into tent camps, while NATO troops stationed in Albania relocated dozens of bunkers to fortify their base at Kukës. The Kosovo Liberation Army also used them as defensive positions during the Kosovo War, though this was not without its risks; on at least one occasion bunkers along Albania's border with Kosovo were mistakenly bombed by NATO aircraft.

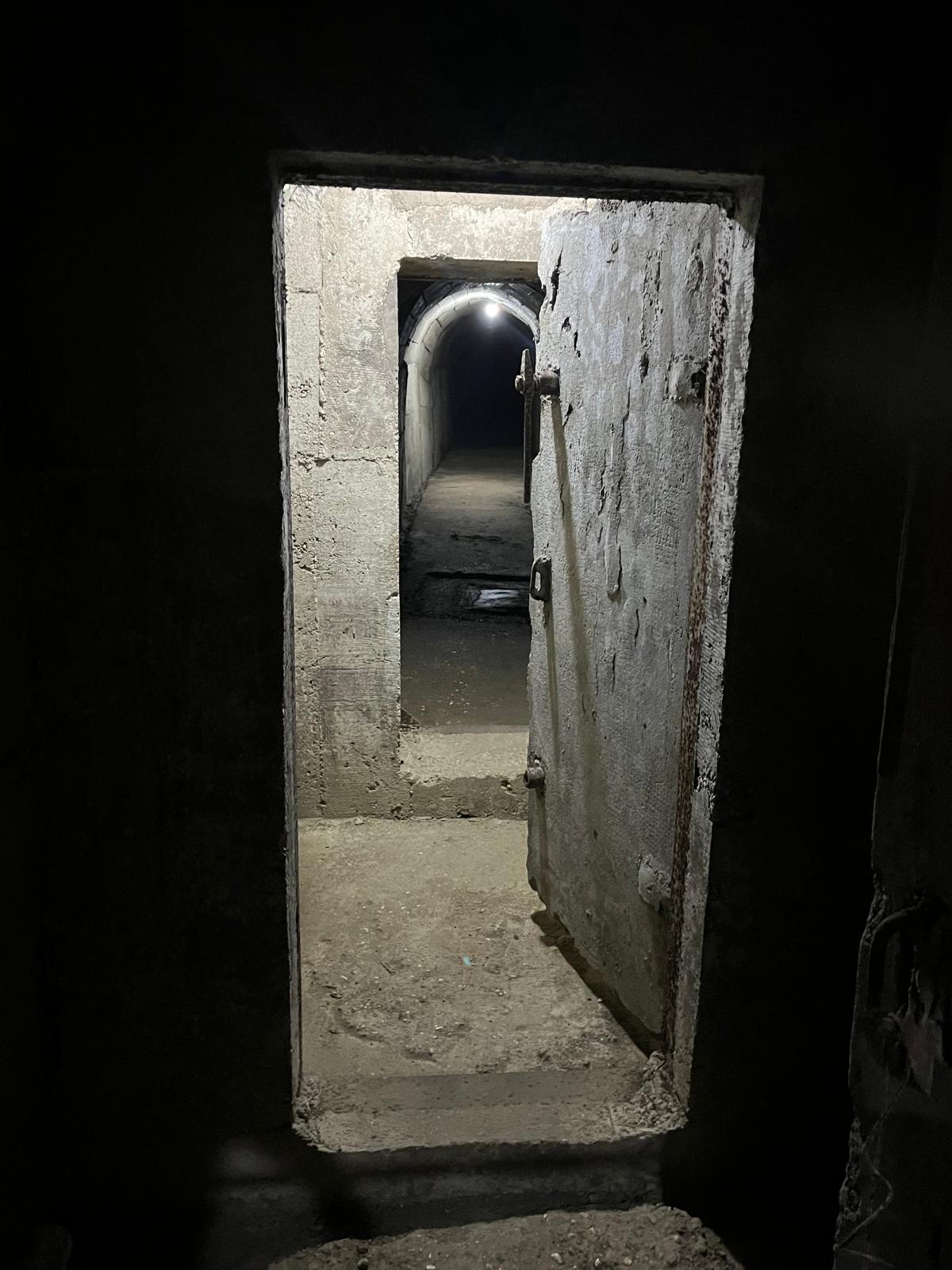
The insides of a bunker in Gjirokaster, Cold War Tunnel Museum.

An acute shortage of housing after the fall of communism in 1992 led some Albanians to set up homes in abandoned bunkers, though the lack of running water and sanitation meant that the area around inhabited bunkers soon became contaminated and unhealthy. A few bunkers have found more creative uses. In the coastal city of Durrës one beachside bunker has been turned into the Restaurant Bunkeri, and another bunker in Gjirokastër was turned into a café.

There have been various suggestions for what to do with them: ideas have included pizza ovens, solar heaters, beehives, mushroom farms, projection rooms for drive-in cinemas, beach huts, flower planters, youth hostels, and kiosks. The bunkers have also been used by young Albanian couples for sexual encounters. "Many Albanians lose their virginity in the bunkers, when they are not being used for sheep or cattle," according to USAID official Raimonda Nelku. "They are in the Albanian psyche."

In November 2014, a five-storey nuclear shelter built into the side of a hill near Tirana for Hoxha was opened as a tourist attraction and art exhibition. The large bunker contains a museum called Bunk'Art 1 with exhibits from World War II and the Hoxhaist period. A second museum called Bunk'Art 2 that focuses on the Sigurimi and atrocities of the Hoxha regime opened near Skanderbeg Square in 2016 in a bunker that connected government buildings.

A 1984 document first exhibited at Bunk'Art in 2014 showed that the Defense Council had built 173,341 bunkers and fortifications out of a planned 221,143. This contradicted previous widely reported estimates of around 750,000 bunkers, which one source says "has no archival source we could find".

Albania's bunkers have become a national symbol. Pencil holders and ashtrays in the shape of bunkers have become one of the country's most popular tourist souvenirs. One range of bunker souvenirs was promoted with a message to buyers: "Greetings to the land of the bunkers. We assumed that you could not afford to buy a big one."

== See also ==
- Architecture of Albania
- Borders of Albania
