= Marubi Academy of Film and Multimedia =

Arts university in Tirana, Albania

Coordinates: 41.3464°N 19.8473°E

- Akademia e Filmit dhe Multimedias Marubi
- Established: September 30, 2004
- Rector: Kujtim Çashku
- Academic staff: Direction, Screenwriting, Editing and Camera
- Students: max.30
- Location: Tirana, Albania
- Campus: Kinostudio
- Colors
- Website: afmm.edu.al

The Marubi Academy of Film and Multimedia (Albanian: Akademia e Filmit dhe Multimedias Marubi) is a school that offers professional, creative, artistic and technical qualifications and education for students who aspire to get involved in the Film and Television Industry in the Republic of Albania. The academy was created per Government decree in 2004, and has students from Serbia, Montenegro, North Macedonia and Albania.

The founder and rector of AFMM is well known Albanian director Kujtim Çashku.

== See also ==
- List of universities in Albania
- List of colleges and universities
- List of colleges and universities by country
