= The Second November =

- Film poster
- Directed by: Viktor Gjika
- Written by: Dhimitër Shuteriqi; Kiço Blushi
- Starring: Sandër Prosi; Bujar Lako; Reshat Arbana
- Cinematography: Lionel Konomi
- Edited by: Marika Vila
- Music by: Kujtim Laro
- Production company: Kinostudio
- Distributed by: Albafilm
- Release date: 27 November 1982
- Running time: 83 minutes
- Country: Albania
- Language: Albanian

The Second November (Albanian: Nëntori i dytë) is a 1982 Albanian historical drama film directed by Viktor Gjika and written by Dhimitër Shuteriqi and Kiço Blushi. Produced for the 70th anniversary of Albania's independence, the film covers the events surrounding Albania gaining its independence from the Ottoman Empire. It was originally filmed in colour, but was shown in black-and-white until 2012.

== Premise ==
The film covers the events of the Albanian revolt of 1912 and the signing of the Albanian Declaration of Independence on 28 November 1912, in Vlorë. The sewing of the first flag of Albania is shown.

== Cast ==
- Sandër Prosi as Ismail Qemali
- Bujar Lako as Luigj Gurakuqi
- Viktor Zhusti as Pandeli Cale
- Reshat Arbana as Isa Boletini
- Ermira Gjata as Motra e Nënës
- Luiza Xhuvani as Katër Motra e Nënës
- Vladimir Muzha as Shoferi
- Anila Bisha as Katër Motra e Nënës
- Pandi Raidhi as Demir Arbana
- Demir Hyskja as Mutasarrif
- Vangjel Heba as Despot
- Vangjel Grabocka as Kozi
- Sulejman Dibra as Turkish General
- Agim Shuka as Jani Minga
- Luan Qerimi as Sali Drenica
- Ilia Shyti as Mullah of Berat
- Spiro Urumi as Xhafer Bej Kadena
- Piro Malaveci as Hasan Prishtina
- Petrit Malaj as Adem Boletini
- Vasjan Lami as Mitrović
- Fatos Sela as Officer
- Hajrie Rondo as Lym Kepi's wife
- Taulant Godaj as Lym Kepi's son

== Production ==
The Second November was produced by Kinostudio for the 70th anniversary of Albania's independence. It was directed by Viktor Gjika and written by Dhimitër Shuteriqi and Kiço Blushi. Shooting was done in Tirana, Fier, Durrës, and Vlorë using 35 mm colour film.

== Release ==
The Second November premiered in Vlorë on 27 November 1982, and shown in black-and-white as Albania lacked the chemicals needed to make colour film. It was released in Italy under the title Il due novembre.

A €60,000 restoration of the film was created by the Albanian Film Academy and Colorlab Corp shown in colour on 2 November 2012, in Tirana. This was the first time that the film was shown with its original colors and with English subtitles, the latter of which were created by a team of four people. One of the child actors was removed from the credits in 1982 due to his father's opposition to Enver Hoxha, but was added in the restoration. The restored version was later shown in the United States.

== Reception ==
Shpend Avdiu, a historian at the Albanological Institute of Pristina, criticized the film's accuracy, stating that it was designed to exclude the role the great powers had in the independence of Albania. Another historian, Xhemajl Halili, stated that the common usage of the flag as displayed by the film is inaccurate and that there was contemporary opposition to the flag.

== Works cited ==
=== Books ===
- Williams, Bruce (2023). Albanian Cinema through the Fall of Communism: Silver Screens and Red Flags. Amsterdam University Press. ISBN 9789048529339.

=== News ===
- ""Nëntori i Dytë" çel Festivalin e Filmit". Gazeta Shqip. 2 November 2012. Archived from the original on 7 April 2025.
- ""Nëntori i Dytë" si i ri, 60 mijë euro restaurimi". Bota Sot. 5 November 2012. Archived from the original on 7 April 2025.
- ""Second November" in Boston". Telegrafi. 2013. Archived from the original on 7 April 2025.
- Behluii, Mirlind (2024). "Dy historianë e kritikojnë filmin "Nëntori i Dytë" për "ideologjizim të historisë": Terminologjia e pasaktë". Nacionale Gazeta. Archived from the original on 7 April 2025.

=== Web ===
- "Nëntori i dytë". Albanian Cinema Project. Archived from the original on 7 April 2025.
- "The Second November". Giffoni Film Festival. Archived from the original on 7 April 2025.
- "The Second November". Dokufest. Archived from the original on 7 April 2025.
- "The Second November". Central State Film Archive. Archived from the original on 7 April 2025.
