= The Man with the Cannon =

1977 film by Viktor Gjika

- Directed by: Viktor Gjika
- Written by: Viktor Gjika
- Starring: Timo Flloko
- Cinematography: Lionel Konomi
- Edited by: Neriman Furxhi
- Music by: Limoz Dizdari
- Distributed by: Albafilm
- Release date: September 19, 1977
- Running time: 86 minutes
- Country: Albania
- Language: Albanian

The Man with the Cannon (Albanian: Njeriu me top) is a 1977 Albanian drama film directed and written by Viktor Gjika based on the 1975 novel by the same title by Dritëro Agolli. Timo Flloko stars as an Albanian partisan during World War II who discovers a cannon left by retreating Axis soldiers.

== Plot ==
Adaptation of the novel with the same title from Dritëro Agolli. Mato Gruda has been feuding with the old man Mere Fizi. Mato Gruda keeps a gun in a hidden place dreaming to use it against Fizies. He keeps an Italian as a helper at home, and calls him Agush. Agush became his teacher to use his war s tool. Hence, the secret of a peasant who joined the war out of necessity comes to light.

== Cast ==
- Timo Flloko as Mato Gruda
- Elida Cangonji as Zare
- Stavri Shkurti as Murat Shtaga
- Drita Pelingu as Esmaja
- Zef Bushati as The Italian
- Kadri Roshi as Mere Fizi
- Thimi Filipi
- Birçe Hasko
- Enea Xhegu

== Production ==
Dritëro Agolli's The Man with the Cannon, his second novel, was published in 1975, and adapted into a film. The script was written over the course of 1975 and 1976. Viktor Gjika directed and wrote the film with Agolli as an consultant. Limoz Dizdari composed the music. Filming was done in Delvinë, Përmet, and Krujë. Kinostudio produced the film. Neriman Furxhi edited the film.

The 1970s was a period of Albanian cinema in which the depiction of Italians and Fascist Italy's control of Albania were common.

== Release ==
The Man with the Cannon premiered in Tirana, on 19 September 1977. In 2017, the Tirana International Film Festival presented four of Gjika's films, including The Man with the Cannon, on what would have been his 80th birthday. It was shown at the Albania, Si Gera film festival held in Rome from 4–7 April 2019. A 4K resolution scan of the film was shown in 2024.

== Reception ==
The Central State Film Archive stated that The Man with the Cannon was one of the most "lasting" contributions to Albanian cinema.

== Works cited ==
- "Albania bids adieu to one of its greatest writers". Tirana Times. 6 February 2017. Archived from the original on 6 April 2025.
- "Albanian Cinema Week in Rome to start with "Lulekuqe mbi mure"". Tirana Times. 4 April 2019. Archived from the original on 6 April 2025.
- "Nikolla Llambro: Filmi "Njeriu me top" i vitit 1977, që shfaqet i digjitalizuar ka një realizim të lartë artistik". Gazeta Sot. 13 September 2024. Archived from the original on 6 April 2025.
- "Njeriu me top". Central State Film Archive. Archived from the original on 6 April 2025.
- "TIFF nderon Viktor Gjikën në 80 vjetor, në Arkivin e Filmit shfaqen katër filma të viteve '70-'80". KultPlus. 7 November 2017. Archived from the original on 6 April 2025.
- Bego, Fabio (2022). "The sound of the other: Albanian–Italian relations and Kinostudio films". Studies in Eastern European Cinema. 13 (1). Taylor & Francis: 3–20. doi:10.1080/2040350X.2021.1938396.
