= Pillbox (military) =

Small fortification with holes through which soldiers can fire ranged weapons

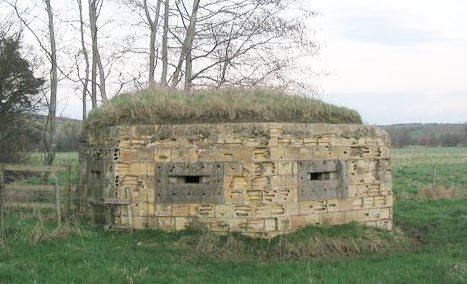
A World War II hexagonal pillbox on the bank of the Mells River at Lullington, Somerset, England

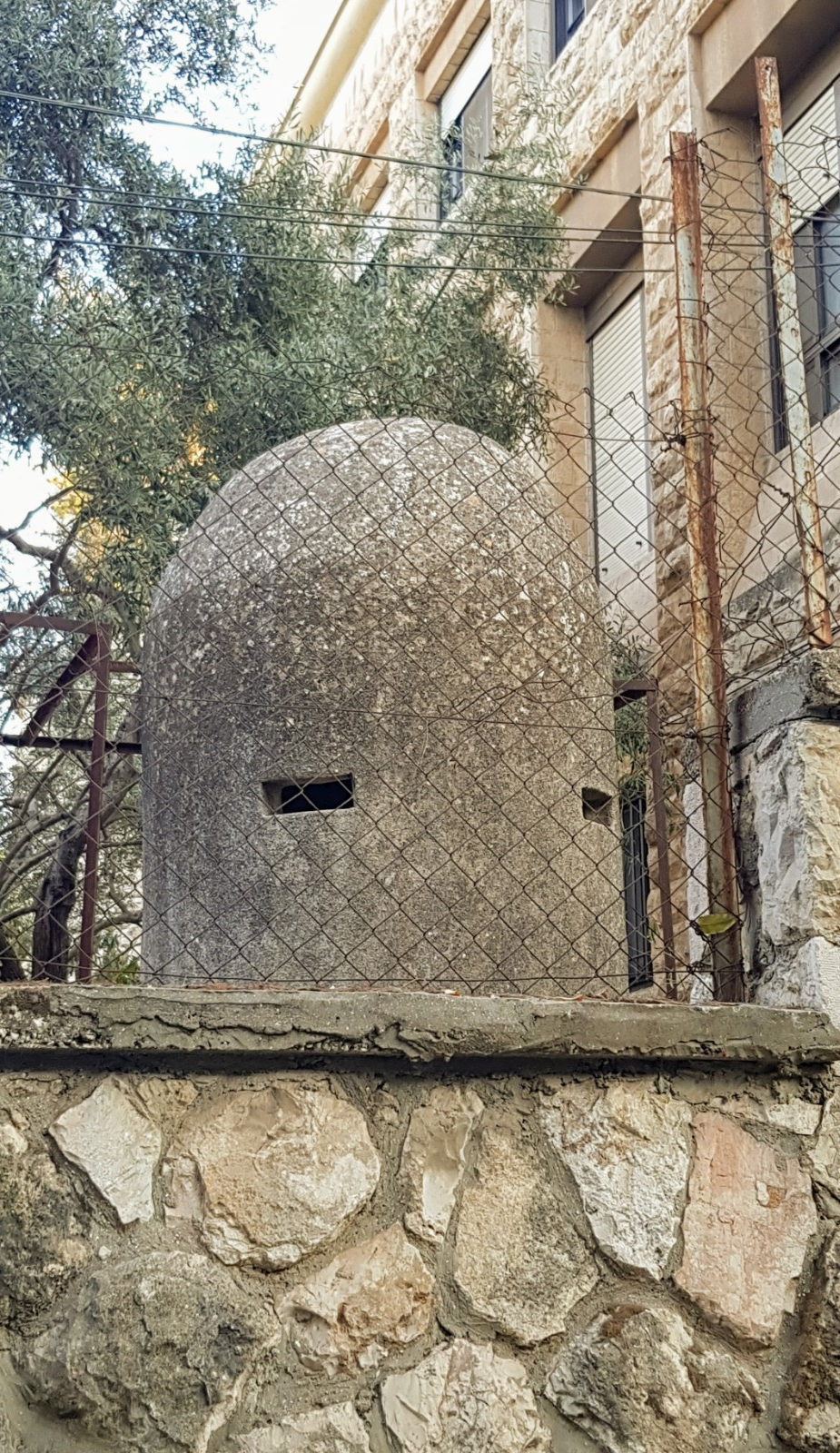
A British mini-pillbox in Jerusalem

A pillbox is a type of blockhouse, or concrete dug-in guard-post, often camouflaged, normally equipped with loopholes through which defenders can fire weapons. It is in effect a trench firing step, hardened to protect against small-arms fire and grenades, and raised to improve the field of fire.

The modern concrete pillbox originated on the Western Front of World War I, in the German Army in 1916.

== Etymology ==
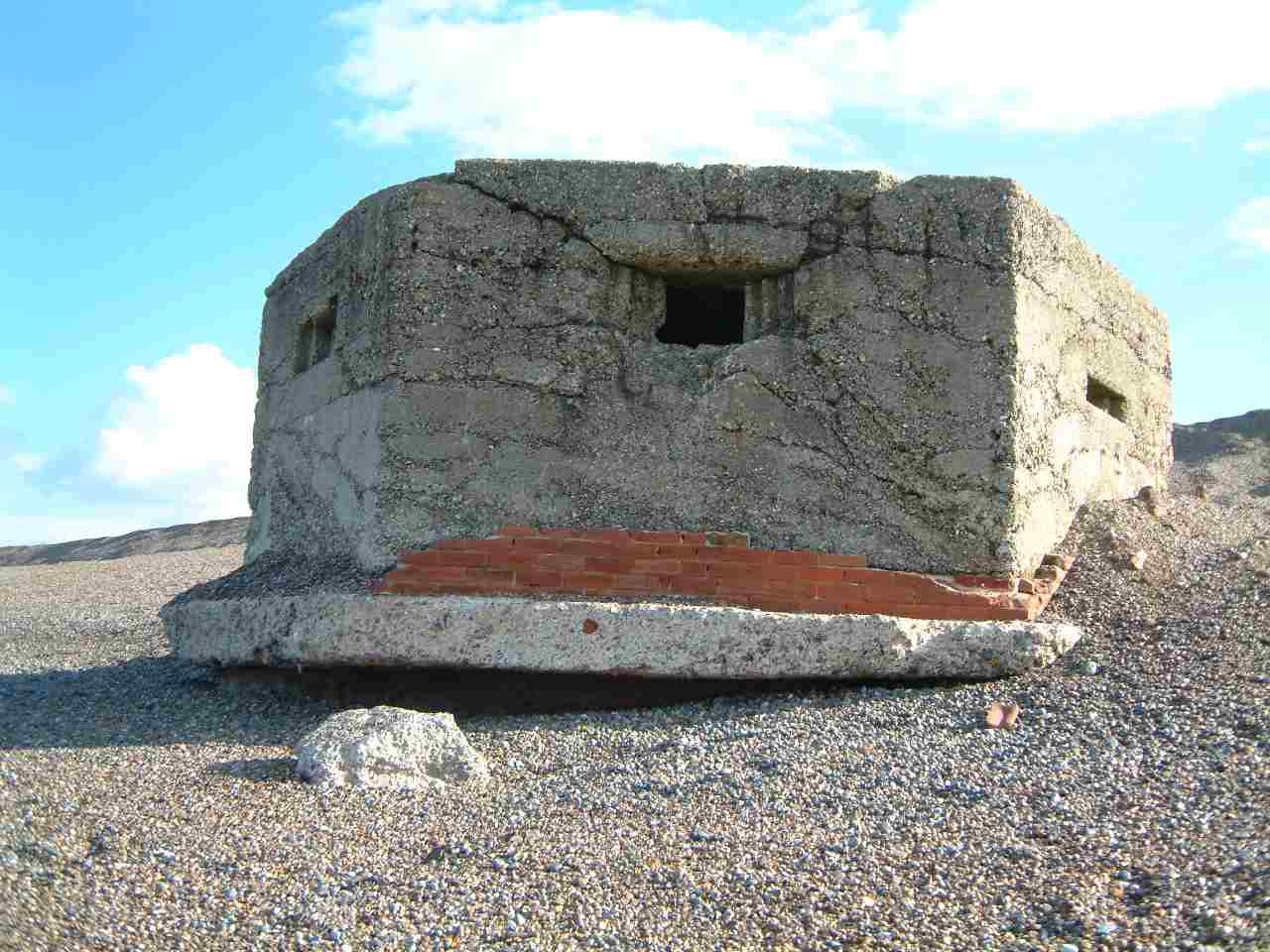
A British World War II type 22 hexagonal pillbox in Kelling on the North Norfolk coast, England. The pillbox broke up during winter storms in February 2021.

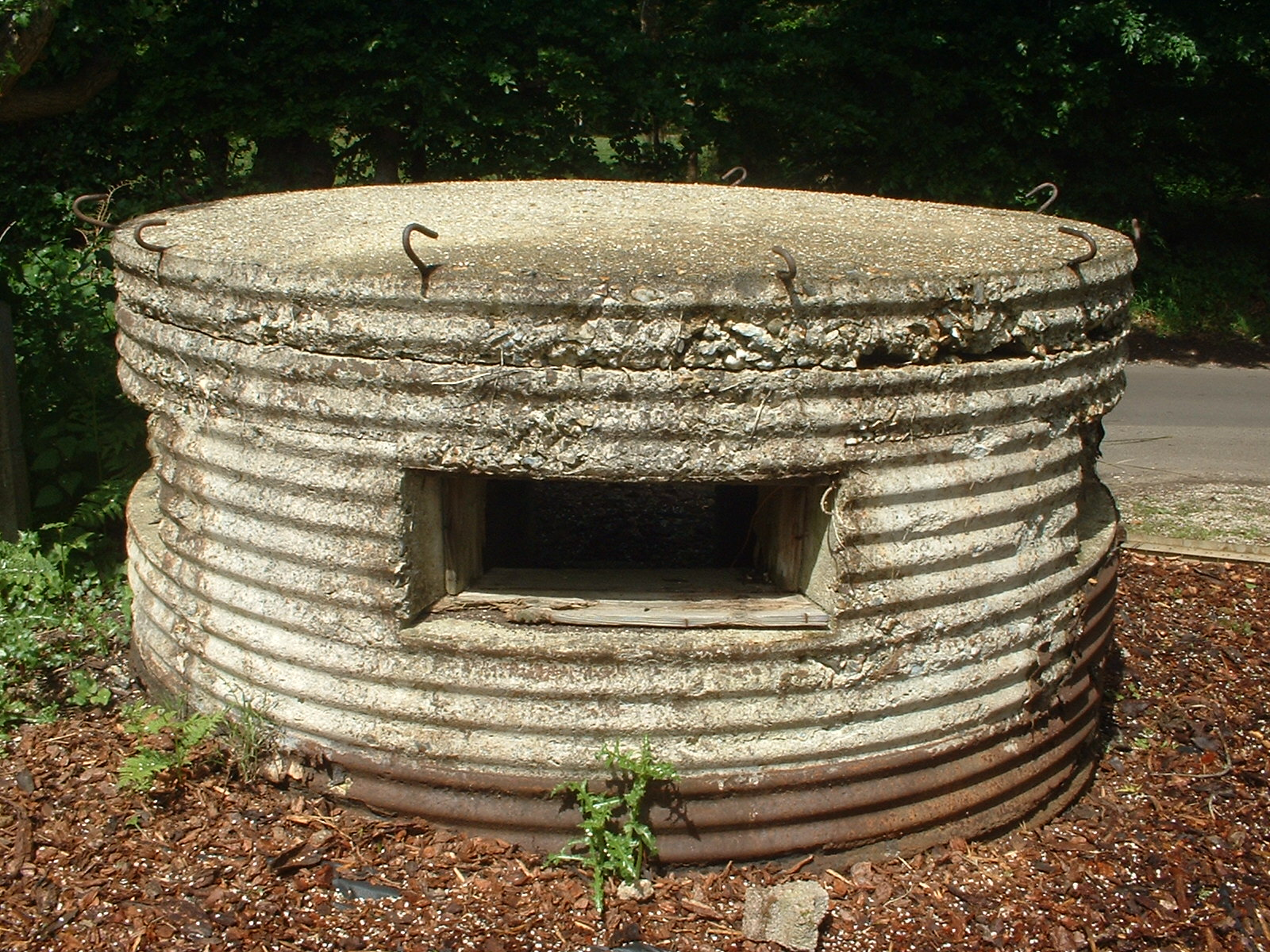
A British World War II type 25 circular pillbox on Sheephatch Lane near Tilford in Surrey, England

The origin of the term is disputed. It has been widely assumed to be a jocular reference to the perceived similarity of the fortifications to the cylindrical and hexagonal boxes in which medical pills were once sold; also, the first German concrete pillboxes discovered by the Allies in Belgium were so small and light that they were easily tilted or turned upside down by the nearby explosion of even medium (240mm) shells. However, it seems more likely that it originally alluded to pillar boxes, with a comparison being drawn between the loophole on the pillbox and the letter-slot on the pillar box.

The term is found in print in The Times on 2 August 1917, following the beginning of the Third Battle of Ypres; and in The Scotsman on 17 September 1917, following the German withdrawal onto the Hindenburg Line. Other unpublished occurrences have been found in war diaries and similar documents of about the same date; and in one instance, as "Pillar Box", as early as March 1916.

== Characteristics ==
The concrete nature of pillboxes means that they are a feature of prepared positions. Some pillboxes were designed to be prefabricated and transported to their location for assembly. During World War I, Sir Ernest William Moir produced a design for concrete machine-gun pillboxes constructed from a system of interlocking precast concrete blocks, with a steel roof. Around 1,500 Moir pillboxes were eventually produced (with blocks cast at Richborough in Kent) and sent to the Western Front in 1918.

Pillboxes are often camouflaged to conceal their location and to maximise the element of surprise. They may be part of a trench system, form an interlocking line of defence with other pillboxes by providing covering fire to each other (defence in depth), or they may be placed to guard strategic structures such as bridges and jetties.

Pillboxes are hard to defeat and require artillery, anti-tank weapons or grenades to overcome.

== Uses ==
The French Maginot Line built between the world wars consisted of a massive bunker and tunnel complex, but as most of it was below ground, little could be seen from the ground level. The exception were the concrete blockhouses, gun turrets, pillboxes and cupolas which were placed above ground to allow the garrison of the Maginot line to engage an attacking enemy.

Between the Abyssinian Crisis of 1936 and World War II, the British built about 200 pillboxes on the island of Malta for defence in case of an Italian invasion. Fewer than 100 pillboxes still exist, and most are found on the northeastern part of the island. A few of them have been restored and are cared for, but many others were demolished. Some pillboxes are still being destroyed nowadays as the authorities do not consider them to have any architectural or historic value, despite heritage NGOs calling to preserve them.

Pillboxes were built in Britain during World War I as defensive measures against sea invasion in some east coast areas. Eight of these pillboxes in Norfolk were given Grade II listed status by Historic England in July 2025.

About 28,000 pillboxes and other hardened field fortifications were constructed in Britain in 1940 as part of the British anti-invasion preparations of World War II. About 6,500 of these structures still survive.

Pillboxes for the Czechoslovak border fortifications were built before World War II in Czechoslovakia in defence against a German attack. None of these were actually used against their intended enemy during the German invasion, but some were used against the advancing Soviet armies in 1945. The Japanese also made use of pillboxes in their fortifications of Iwo Jima, and on other occupied islands and territories.

About 750,000 pillboxes (Albanian: bunkerët) were built by the Albanian Hoxhaist government from the 1960s until the 1980s in Cold War paranoia, most never used for their intended purpose although few were used in the Insurrection of 1997 and the 1999 Kosovo War and the construction costs were a scandalous drain on needed funds for social development. Most are now derelict, though some have been repurposed as residential accommodations, cafés, nightclubs, storehouses, animal shelters and one in Tirana as a museum.

During the 2022 Russian invasion of Ukraine, pillboxes have been used to gain advantages in trench warfare.

== Gallery ==
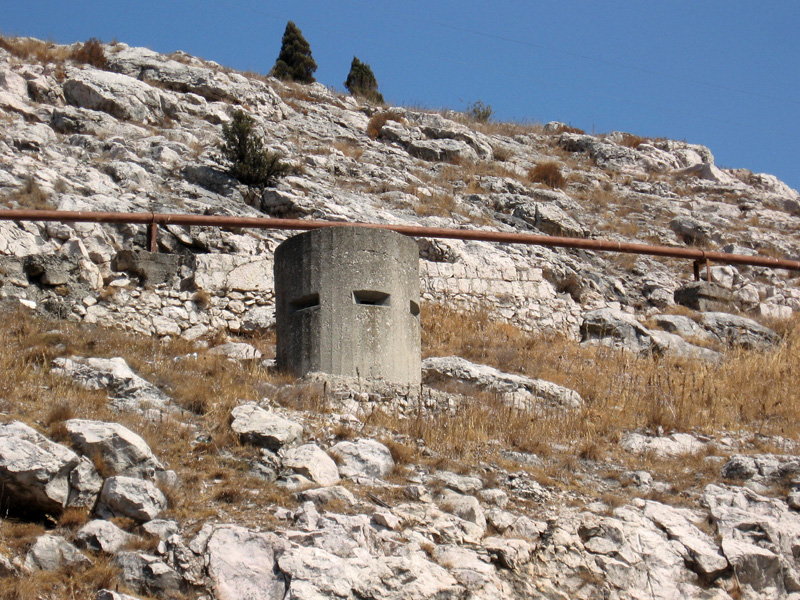
A pillbox in Balaklava, Ukraine

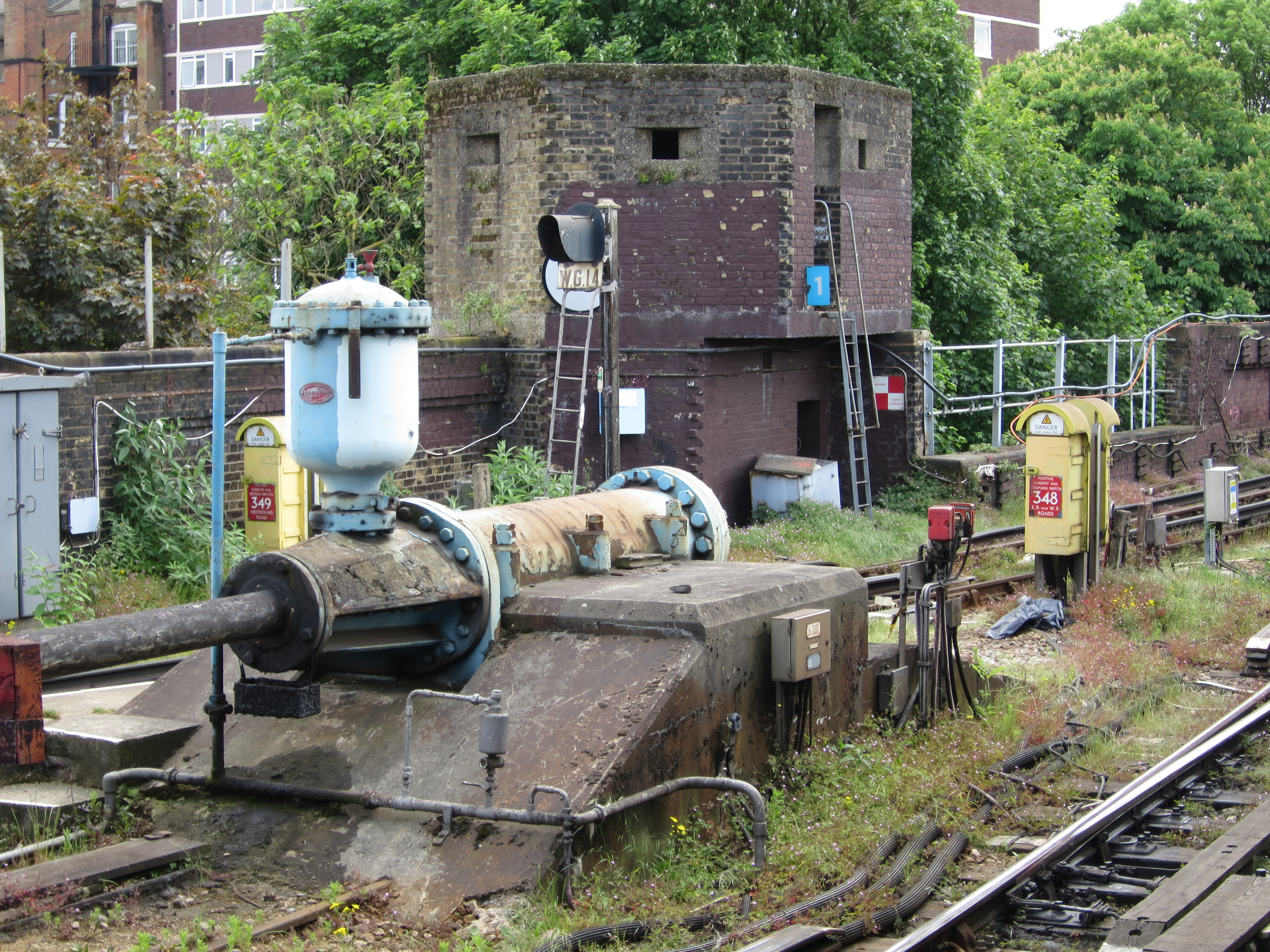
Pillbox at Putney Bridge in London, England

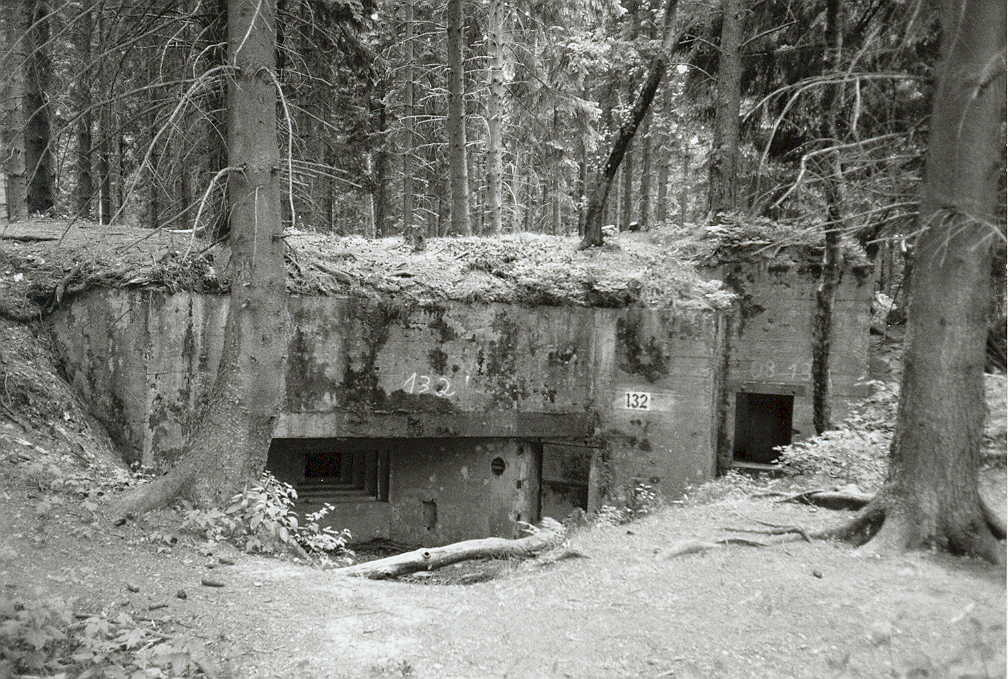
A type 10 pillbox on the Siegfried Line in Aachen, Germany

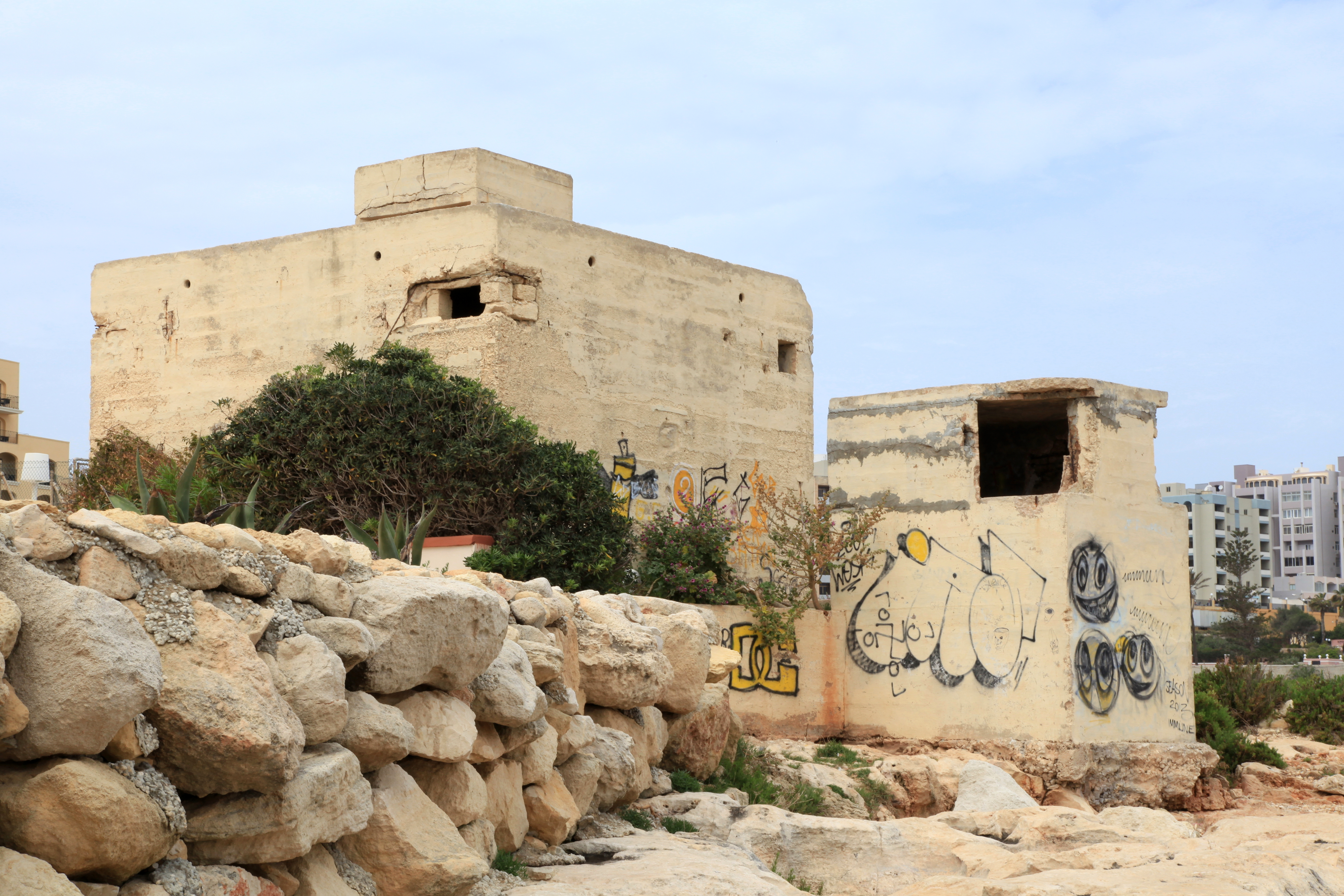
A square pillbox in St Julian's, Malta

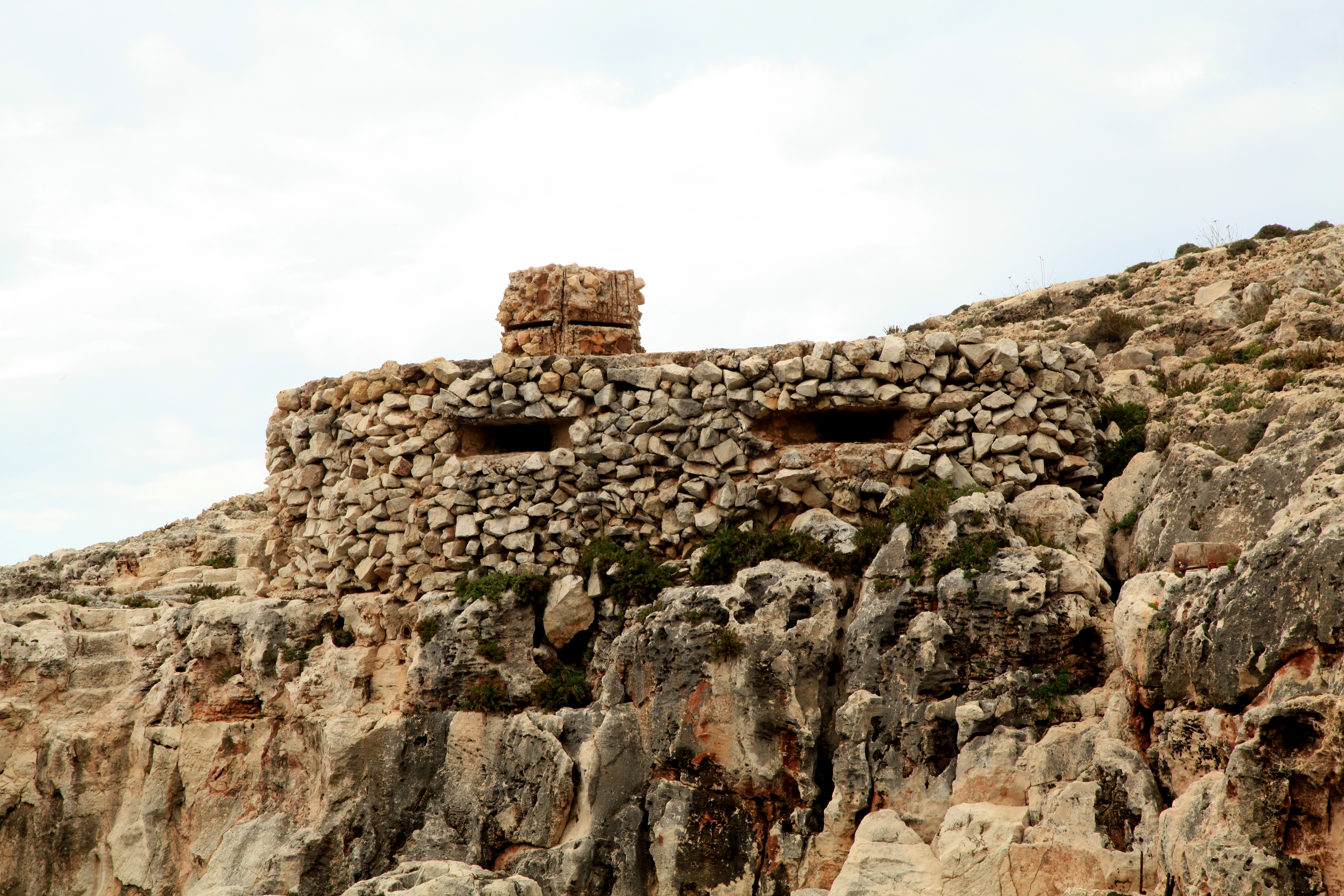
A camouflaged pillbox in Qrendi, Malta

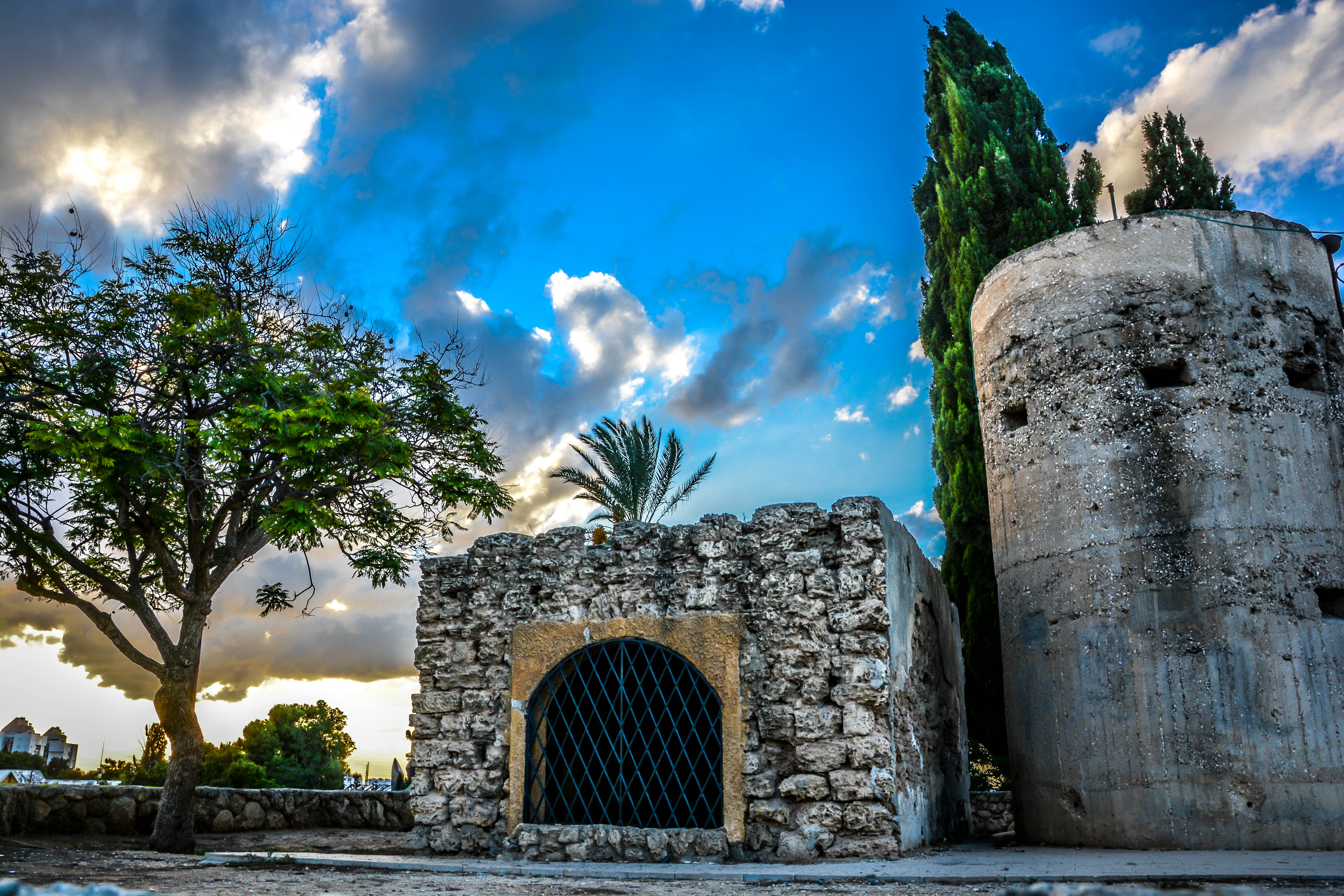
An Israeli pillbox 5.4 metres above ground, in Modi'in-Maccabim-Re'ut (near Route 443)

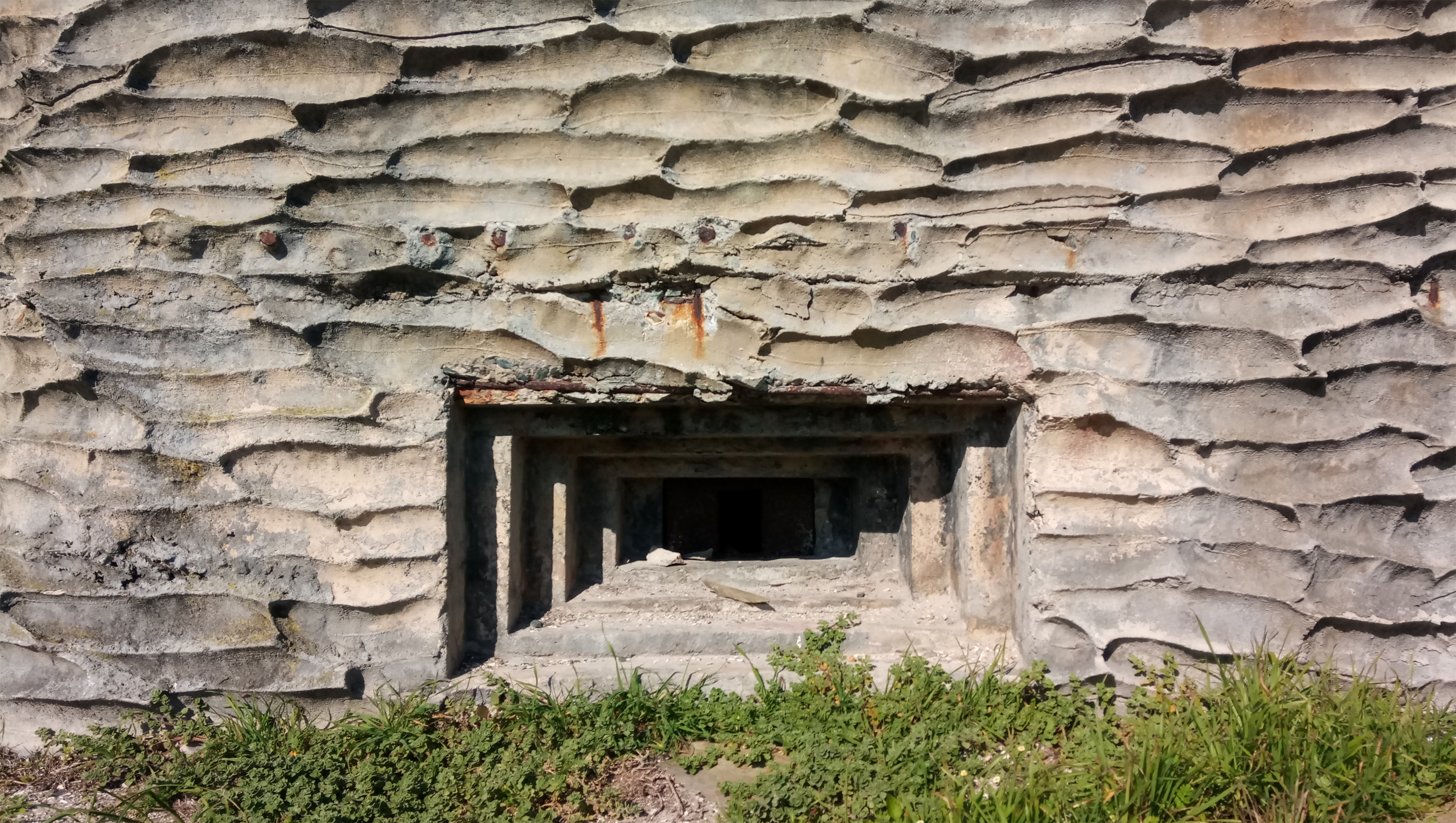
A guard pillbox used on Robben Island, South Africa, during World War II

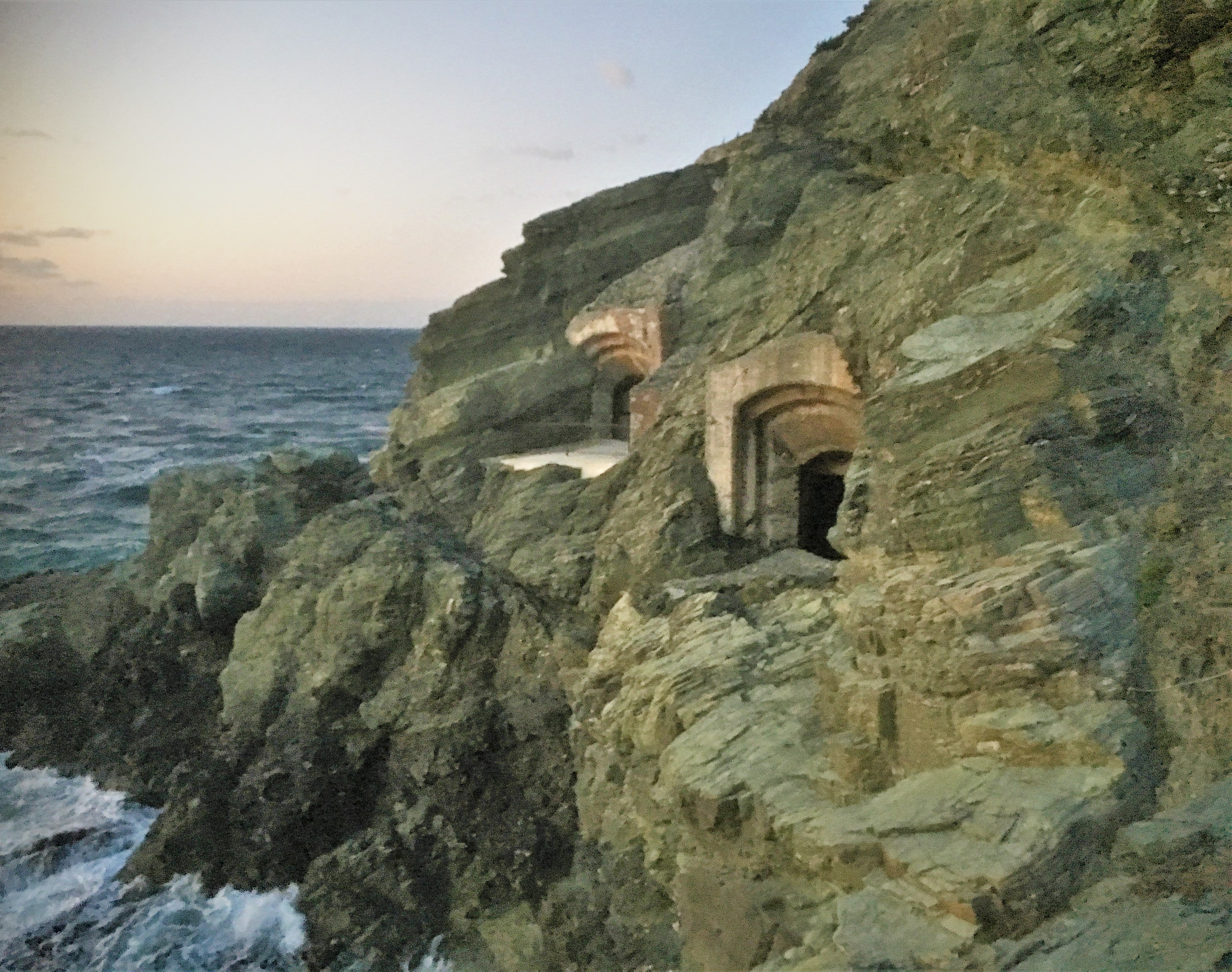
Exterior of a quay pillbox in Ikata, Japan

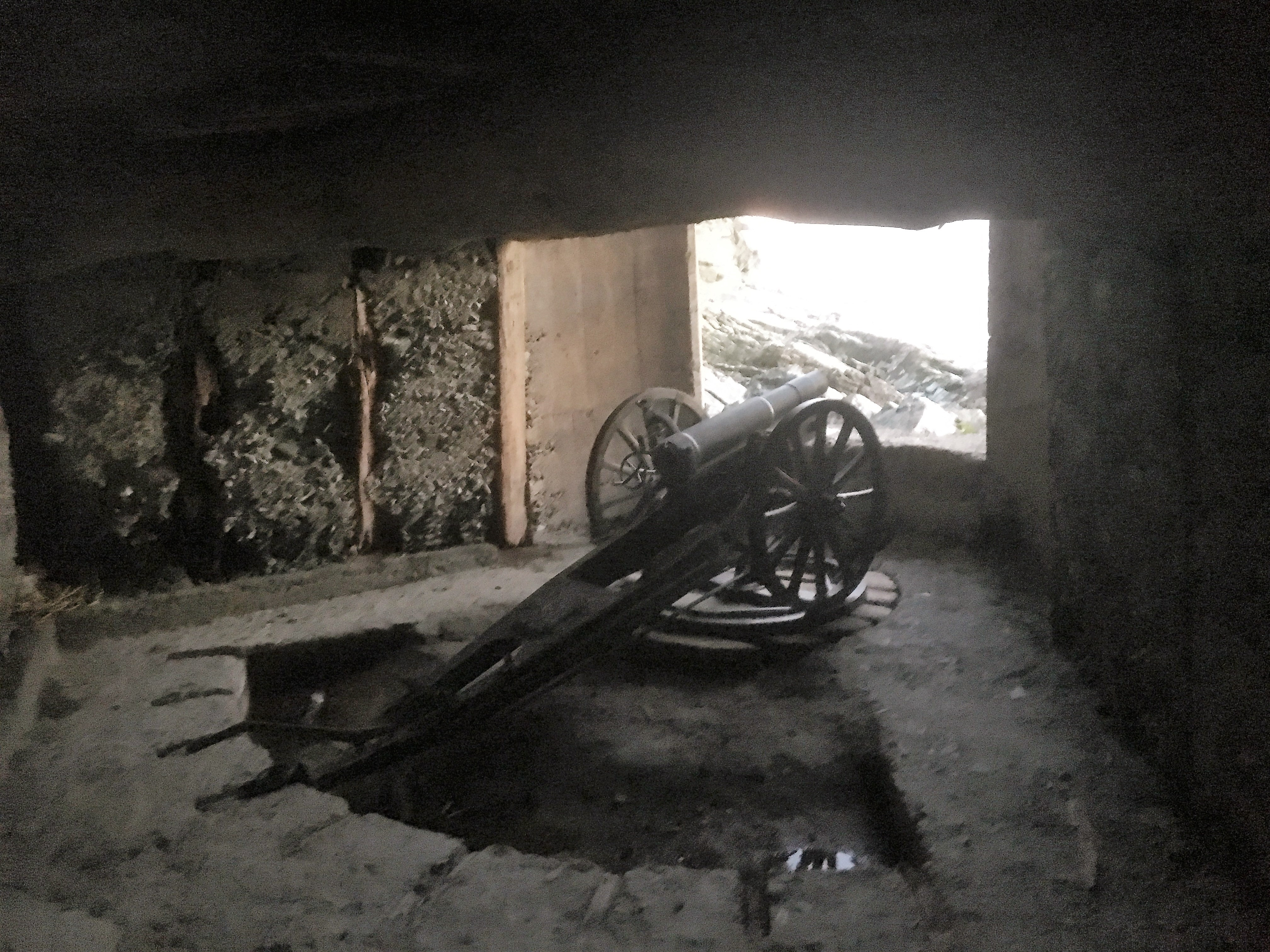
Interior of a quay pillbox in Ikata, Japan

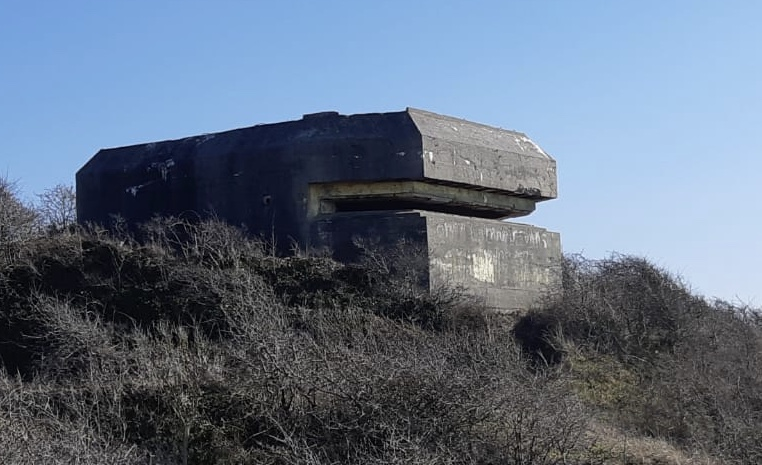
Blockhouse south of Le Touquet, France, formerly part of the Atlantic Wall
