= Sandër Prosi =

Albanian actor (1920–1985)

- Born: Aleksandër Prosi; 6 January 1920; Shkodër, Principality of Albania
- Died: 25 February 1985 (aged 65); Durrës, PSR Albania
- Occupation: Actor
- Years active: 1947–1985
- Spouse: Filomena Prosi
- Children: Aristidh Prosi, Ardian Prosi
- Awards: People's Artist

Aleksandër Prosi (Aromanian: Sandãr Prosi; 6 January 1920 – 25 February 1985) was an Albanian actor. He is considered one of the greatest actors of 20th-century Albanian cinema, and played hundreds of roles in Albanian stage and cinematography. He is best known for his portrayal of Ismail Qemali Bey Vlora in Nëntori i Dytë (1982).

== Life and work ==
Prosi was born in Shkodër, Albania, in January 1920. His family moved to Tirana when he was 14, where he graduated at Qemal Stafa High School. Prosi's father was originally from Moscopole and was an Aromanian.

His first role was in William Tell drama from Schiller. He went to study dentistry in Vienna, Austria, but did not finish his studies. In 1947, he participates in the competition at the National Theatre of Albania and wins. He has interpreted more than 100 roles in the theater and in movies.

He has created unforgettable characters such as Vuksani in "The second face" (Albanian: Fytyra e dytë), Horatio in Hamlet, Otello in Otello, Miller in Intrigue and Love from Schiller, Dhaskal Todri in "Letter's way" (Albanian: Udha e shkronjave), Ismail Qemali in "Second November" (Albanian: Nëntori i Dytë), etc.

He was a professor in the Academy of Arts of Albania during 1962—1975.

He was given the People's Artist of Albania award by the Albanian government. He is considered one of the greatest Albanian actors of all time.

His death in 1985 created many controversies in Albania, as it was talked as a suicide, these were just never proved gossips, and the media never reported his end of life as such. In 2010, Prosi was awarded the Honor of the Nation title (Albanian: Nder i Kombit) by the President of the Republic of Albania.

In January 2026, files from the Sigurimi were revealed stating that he died by suicide on 25 February 1985 at the Vollga Hotel in Durrës, during the filming of the movie Pranverë e hidhur. According to the documents, he jumped from a second-floor window of the hotel where he was staying, resulting in his death. The files also noted that the incident occurred following a meeting with the well-known Kosovar singer Nexhmije Pagarusha.
