= Kolonel Bunker =

- Directed by: Kujtim Çashku
- Written by: Kujtim Çashku
- Produced by: Kujtim Çashku
- Starring: Agim Qirjaqi
- Cinematography: Afrim Spahiu; Jerzy Rudzinski
- Edited by: Kahena Attia-Riveill
- Music by: Andrzej Krause
- Production companies: Orafilm; A 3B Productions; Film Studio Dom
- Release date: 1996
- Running time: 90 minutes
- Countries: Albania; France; Poland
- Language: Albanian

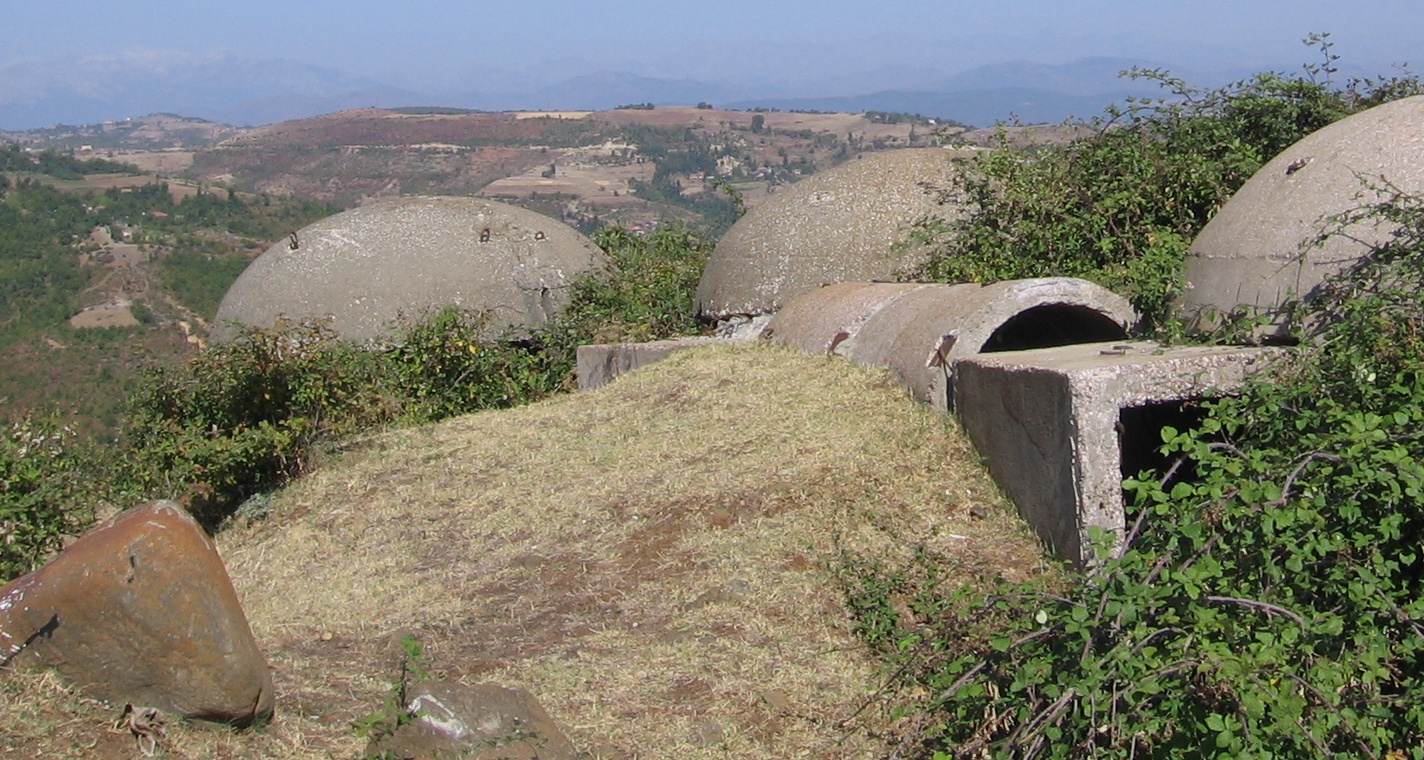
Example of widespread concrete military bunkers in Albania.

Kolonel Bunker is a 1996 Albanian historical film directed and written by Kujtim Çashku. Starring Agim Qirjaqi and Anna Nehrebecka, the film covers Enver Hoxha's mass construction of bunkers in Albania. French and Polish companies produced the film alongside Albania's Orafilm.

== Plot ==
Enver Hoxha ruled Albania with an iron fist for nearly 40 years, and for a long time Albania was the only Hoxhaism regime and by far the most isolationist society in Europe—politically, psychologically and physically. This film is about Colonel Muro Neto, a character based on the historical engineer Josif Zagali, the man Hoxha charged with constructing the bunkers throughout the country which ostensibly protected Albania from its enemies both without and within. He became known as "Kolonel Bunker."

== Cast ==
- Agim Qirjaqi as Muro Neto
- Anna Nehrebecka as Ana
- Cun Lajci as Eminenca Gri
- Fatime Lajçi as Aviator's wife
- Xhevat Limani as Prison commander
- Guljem Radoja
- Kadri Roshi
- Petrit Malaj as Internment commander

== Production ==
Directed and written by Kujtim Çashku, Kolonel Bunker was produced by Albania's Orafilm, France's A 3B Productions, and Poland's Film Studio Dom. Kahena Attia-Riveill edited the film and Andrzej Krause composed the music. Josif Zagali, who Muro Neto is based off, consulted for the film. Filming was done in Tirana.

== Release ==
Kolonel Bunker was released in 1996. It was shown at the Montreal World Film Festival and Thessaloniki International Film Festival. Albania selected it as its nominee for the Academy Award for Best International Feature Film at the 69th Academy Awards, but it was not one of the finalists.

== Reception ==
Philip Kemp, writing for Variety, praised the film's "grimly humorous impact" and that technical problems and "self-consciously poetic interludes" did not weaken it.

== See also ==
- List of Albanian submissions for the Academy Award for Best Foreign Language Film
- List of Albanian films of the 1990s

== Works cited ==
- "39 Countries Hoping for Oscar Nominations". Academy Awards. 13 November 1996. Archived from the original on 9 February 1999.
- "Kolonel Bunker". Central State Film Archive. Archived from the original on 9 April 2025.
- "Colonel Bunker". Turner Classic Movies. Archived from the original on 8 April 2025.
- "Contractual Dispute Threatens Closure Of Marubi Film Academy". Tirana Times. 25 February 2009. Archived from the original on 9 April 2025.
- Kemp, Philip (8 December 1996). "PRODUCTION: Agon in development". Variety. Archived from the original on 8 April 2025.
- Musliu, Fahri (12 January 2024). "Dëshmia e rrallë e "Kolonel Bunker": Në '82-in, pasi u lirova nga burgu i shkrova një letër Enver Hoxhës, ku i kërkova të ndalonte bunkerizimin, por më arrestuan përsëri dhe…". Variety. Archived from the original on 9 April 2025.
