= Viktor Gjika =

Albanian film director and screenwriter (1937–2009)

- Born: 23 June 1937; Korçë, Albania
- Died: 3 March 2009 (aged 71)
- Occupations: Film director, screenwriter
- Years active: 1961–2009
- Awards: People's Artist

Viktor Gjika (23 June 1937 – 3 March 2009) was an Albanian director, filmmaker and screenwriter. For his distinguished and remarkable contribution to the cinema, he was awarded the highest title as People's Artist in 1985. He graduated from VKIG Cinematographic Institute of Moscow in Russia. Together with a classmate, presenting their academic degree when graduated, they shot the short film Nobody Ever Dies, based on Ernest Hemingway's story of the same name, which was awarded the First Prize at the Worldwide Cinematographic Institutes Film Festival in the Netherlands in 1961. He created more than 15 movies and over 25 documentary films.

He was the general director of Shqipëria e Re National Film Studio in Tirana for almost 10 years in the 1980s, until 1991.

He was a member of several international film festival juries such as Giffoni Film Festival, Annecy Film Festival, and others.

== Filmography ==
=== As film director ===
- Diogjeni i qyteterimit shqiptar (2004)
- Rrenjet (2002)
- Kur ikin korbat (2000)
- Unë jam Ismail Qemali (1997)
- Rron or rron, nuk vdes Fan Noli (1997)
- Antoni Athanas (1995)
- Vitet e rinisë (1988)
- Vjeshtë e nxehtë e '41 (1985)
- Enver Hoxha, tungjatjeta (1983)
- The Second November (1982)
- Koha e Partisë (1981)
- Besniku i Partisë (1980)
- Në çdo stinë (1980)
- Pranë vatrave, pranë zemrave (1979)
- The General Gramophone (1978)
- The Man with the Cannon (1977)
- Përballimi (1976)
- Arti shqiptarë në shekuj (1974)
- Katër këngë për Partinë (1974)
- Rrugë të bardha (1974)
- Yjet e netëve të gjata (1972)
- 10 ditë sulmi (1970)
- 1 Maj 1970 (1970)
- I teti në bronz (1970)
- Horizonte të hapura (1968)
- Fitimtarët (1966)
- Përse mendohen këto male (1965)
- Bistricë '63 (1964)
- Kur vjen nëntori (1964)
- Takimet në Helsinki (1962)
- Njeriu kurrë nuk vdes (1961)

=== As screenwriter ===
- Kur ikin korbat (2000)
- Unë jam Ismail Qemali (1997)
- Antoni Athanas (1995)
- Njerëz në rrymë (1989)
- Në çdo stinë (1980)
- Njeriu me top (1977)
- Katër këngë për Partinë (1974)
- Yjet e netëve të gjata (1972)
- 10 ditë sulmi (1970)
- 1 Maj 1970 (1970)
- I teti në bronz (1970)
- Fitimtarët (1966)
- Bistricë '63 (1964)
- Kur vjen nëntori (1964)
- Njeriu kurrë nuk vdes (1961)

=== As cameraman ===
- Vendetta – Blutrache in Albanien (1996)
- Në çdo stinë (1980)
- The General Gramophone (1978)
- Horizonte të hapura (1968)
- Komisari i Dritës (1966)
- Përse mendohen këto male (1965)
- Bistricë '63 (1964)
- Heshtje që flet (1964)
- Kur vjen nëntori (1964)
- Detyrë e posaçme (1963)
- Takimet në Helsinki (1962)
- Debatik (1961)
- Njeriu kurrë nuk vdes (1961)
- Migjeni (1961)
