= Kadri Roshi =

Albanian actor (1924–2007)

- Roshi in 2000
- Born: Kadri Maksut Roshi; 4 January 1924; Mallakastër, Albania
- Died: 6 February 2007 (aged 83); Tirana, Albania
- Occupation: Actor
- Years active: 1945–2002
- Spouse: Drita Taho (m. 1947; died 2007)
- Children: 2
- Awards: People's Artist

Kadri Maksut Roshi (4 January 1924 – 6 February 2007) was an Albanian actor and a figure in Albanian art.. He was known for his performances in films and the theatre. He won Albania's People's Artist of Albania award.

== Early life ==
Roshi was Born in Ballsh, Mallakastër, Albania. He faced significant hardships from a young age. His mother died when he was two years old and his father, when he was twelve. Subsequently, he became an orphan. In his quest for survival, Roshi moved through various Albanian cities, including Vlora, Kavajë, Gjirokastër, Durrës, and finally Tirana. During this period, he undertook various jobs such as a port laborer, maintenance worker, and cinema ticket seller.

== Career ==
Roshi's passion for acting was ignited by his primary school teacher, leading him to join the People's Theater in Tirana at the age of 21. He began as a prompter and quickly rose to prominence, becoming a central figure in Albanian theater. In 1947, he was granted the opportunity to study in Zagreb, Croatia. However, due to political tensions between Yugoslavia and Albania, he transferred to Prague, Czech Republic, where he completed his studies with distinction.

Throughout his career, Roshi portrayed approximately 215 roles in theater and film. Some of his notable film appearances include: Tana, Gjeneral Gramafoni, Ballë për ballë, Kolonel Bunker etc.

== Personal life and death ==
Kadri was married to Drita Taho and they had a son, Kliti Roshi who is also an actor of Albanian film and stage, and a daughter named Ermira who is an opera singer.

Roshi died on 6 February 2007 at the age of 83 in Tirana. His legacy endures through his extensive body of work, which continues to inspire and influence Albanian actors and audiences alike.

== Filmography ==
Roshi on a 2026 stamp of Albania

Year	Title	Role
1958	Tana	Lefter Dhosi
1970	I Teti në Bronx	Ademi
1971	Kur Zbardhi një ditë	Secretary of Council
1971	Malet me blerim mbuluar	Safa Yameri
1976	Lulëkuqet mbi Mure	Kujdestari
1976	Tokë e Përgjakur	
1976	Fijet që priten	Marko Ruvina
1976	Përballimi	Nazifi
1977	Zemrat që nuk plaken	
1977	Shembja e idhujve	
1978	Gjeneral Gramafoni	
1979	Liri a vdekje	
1979	Këshilltarët	
1979	Ballë për ballë	
1980	Ushtari i vogël Velo	
1980	Dëshmorët e monumenteve	
1982	Era e ngrohtë e thellësive	
1983	Apasionata	
1984	Fejesa e Blertës	
1986	Rrethimi i vogël	
1986	Kur ndahesh nga shokët	
1988	Rekonstruksioni	
1988	Pesha e kohës	
1990	Fletë të bardha	
1991	Vdekja e burrit	
1994	Një ditë nga një jetë	
1998	Kolonel Bunker	
