= Thimi Filipi =

Albanian actor (1926–1990)

- Born: 1 March 1926; Korçë, Albania
- Died: 1 July 1990 (aged 64); Tirana, Albania
- Occupation: Actor
- Years active: 1958–1987
- Awards: People's Artist

Thimi Filipi (1 March 1926 – 1 July 1990) was an Albanian actor. He appeared in numerous films since the 1950s. He played the roles of fathers, grandfathers and communists throughout his whole career in cinema.

== Life ==
Thimi Filipi was born in the city of Korçë in 1926. His first roles were in non-professional acting troupes in Korçë. During the Second World War he participated in partisan formations, where he worked to create partisan theaters. At the end of the war, work began at the Korçë hospital. He began playing roles with the city's professional theater. In 1954, he started working as a professional actor at the "Andon Zako Çajupi" theater. His first role was in the drama, The Flower of Memory.

He went on to act in more than 30 feature and television films. His first role in cinematography will coincide with the first, entirely Albanian film, Tana, in the role of party secretary. Other roles would follow. In 1986, he received the "Aleksander Moisiu" Award.

== Legacy ==
For his artistic merits, on 5 August 1991, Filipi was posthumously honored with the high title "People's Artist".

== Filmography ==
- Pranvera s’erdhi vetëm - (1988)... Babai i Irenës
- Vrasje ne gjueti – (1987)... Xha Llazi.
- Rrethi i kujtesës – (1987)... Loro
- Tri ditë nga një jetë – (1986)... xha Shimo
- Enveri ynë – 1985
- Asgjë nuk harrohet – (1985)... Gramozi, kryetari i grupit hetimor
- Nata e parë e lirisë – (1984)... Komisari
- Kush vdes në këmbë - (1984)...Bujku
- Shirat e vjeshtës – (1984)... Ustai
- Militanti – (1984)... Babai i Visar Shundos
- Fraktura – (1983)... Gjyshi
- Apasionata - (1983)... Take Rizai babai i Mires
- Njeriu i mirë – (1982)... shoku Astrit
- Në kufi të dy legjendave – (1981)
- Si gjithë të tjerët – (1981)... usta Nashua
- Vëllezër dhe shokë – (1980)... babai i Vasos
- Shoqja nga fshati – (1980)... Shefi i bujqësisë
- Një ndodhi në port – (1980)... Petro
- Mësonjëtorja – (1979)... xha Vani
- Mysafiri – (1979)... Akrepi
- Ballë për Ballë – (1979)... Xhemal Struga
- Dollia e dasmës time - (1978)... Babai i nuses
- Njeriu me top – (1977)... Fahredini
- Gunat përmbi tela (1977)... Kapedani
- Streha e re - (1977)... Shoku Dane, Kryetari i Kooperatives
- Përballimi – (1976)... Neziri
- Nusja dhe shtetrrethimi – (1974)... xha Jani
- Yjet e netëve të gjata – (1972)... Xhandari
- I teti ne bronz – (1970)... Ballist
- Vitet e para – (1965)... Gjika, Sekretari i partisë
- Tana – (1958)... Sekretari i Partisë
