= Aleksandër Peçi =

Albanian composer

Aleksandër Peçi (born 11 July 1951 in Tirana) is an Albanian composer. Peçi has composed for movie soundtracks, symphonic, ballet, and operatic settings, among many others.

== Education ==
He studied at the Conservatoire National Supérieur de Musique et de Danse de Paris, Academia Santa Cecilia, and the University of Arts, Tirana, where he worked with Çesk Zadeja. In Paris, he worked with Ton de Leeuw, Paul Méfano, and Jacques Charpentier. In Amsterdam, Peçi studied with Daan Manneke at the Conservatorium van Amsterdam.

== Career ==
Peçi has written over 922 compositions and editions, and 35 CD albums of his music have been published. At the Conservatorio Santa Cecilia, he composed "Etera Tondo", modeled after Paradis of Dante Alighieri. Then, he worked as the director of the Palace of Culture in Përmet. In 1979, he became the artistic director of the National Ensemble of Popular Songs and Dances. In 1989, Peçi composed the song "Toka E Diellit", which won the Albanian music contest, Festivali i Këngës. Since 1992, he has taught at the Academy of Fine Arts in Tirana.

Aleksandër Peçi has participated in the Venice Biennale, the Manchester International Festival, and ISCM World Music Days. His music has been premiered and performed in Carnegie Hall (New York), Steinway Piano Gallery, EuroPianos (Naples, Florida), University of Miami, and Prague Conservatory. He has received commissions from the Ministry of Culture (Albania), Radio France, SACEM, and Montreal Film Studio. In 2011, his music was performed in Moscow, Paris, Texas, Ecuador, Louisiana, Armenia, Oman, and Kosovo in a worldtour.

In August 2016, the Moscow Conservatory presented a first-time event featuring his Five Piano Sonatas. Peçi's piano composition "Muzikë Kabaistike", received its world premiere by Redi Llupa at the Kaleidoscope MusArt Concert Series in Miami, Florida, in February 2016.

== Awards and titles ==
- Merited Artist in 1989
- 1979 Albanian Film Festival with Gjeneral Gramafoni
- 2000 festival with Dasma e Sakos
- First Prize for "Rhapsody No. 2 for violin and orchestra" at the 1975 Koncertet e Majit, Tirana
- First Prize for the ballet Kecat dhe ujku at the 1978 National competition
- First Prize at the 1981 Koncertet e Majit, Tirana, with the song "Rritim jetën tonë"
- Special Prize awarded at the 1982 Balkan Film Festival in Istanbul for "Gjeneral Gramafoni"
- First Prize at the 1989 Festivali i këngës në RTSH for the song "Toka e Diellit"
- First Prize at the 2002 "Muza" National Competition

In 2003, he won the Silver Remi Award at the Houston, Texas, World Fest for the music of Women without wings (produced by Cinestudio). In 2021, he won first prize with Sonata no.2 for violoncello Mitosfera and first prize in Germany with the film Ritrato infinito di Clara Bellini.
