= Kujtim Çashku =

Albanian filmmaker

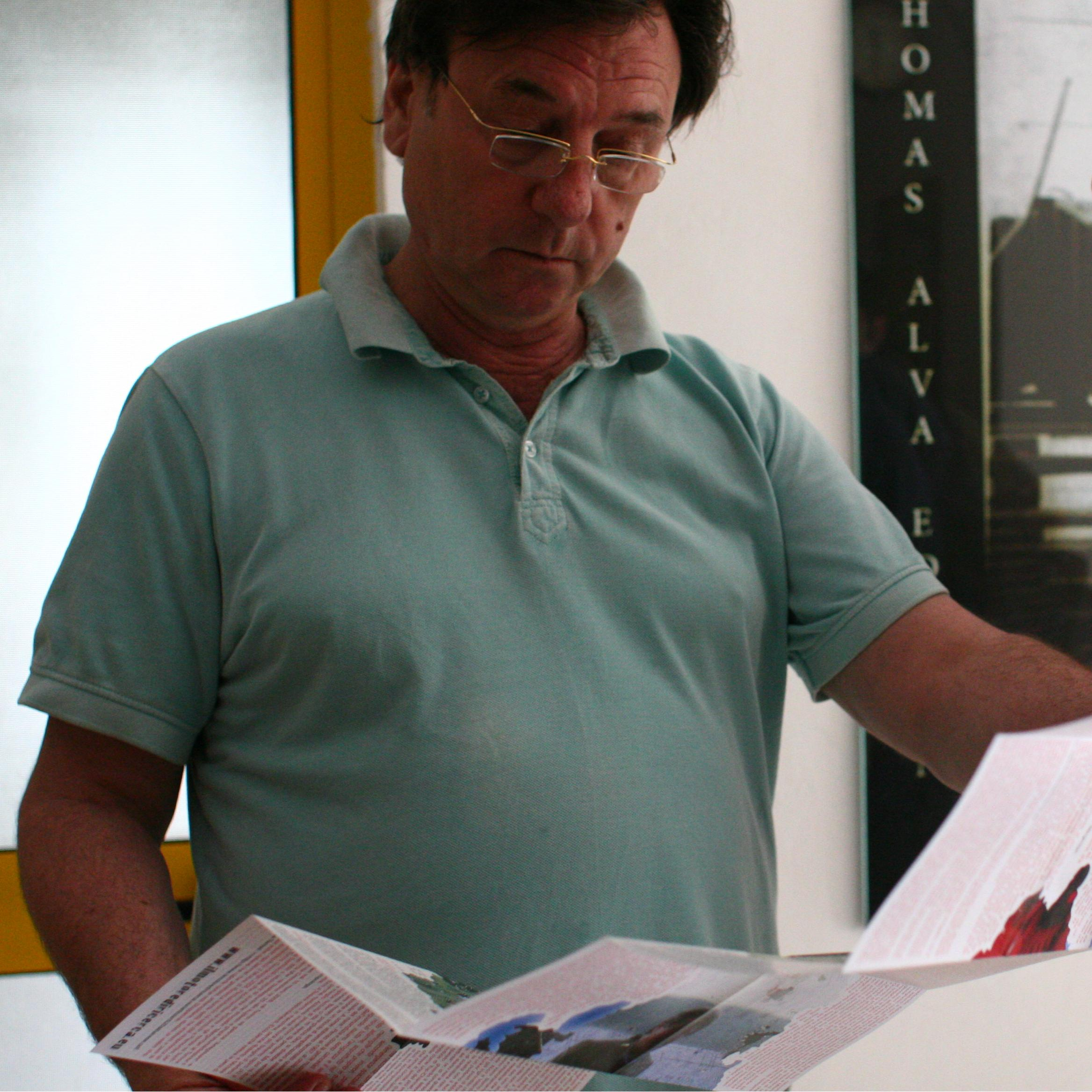
- Kujtim Çashku in Tirana (2008)
- Born: August 5, 1950 (age 76); Tirana, Albania
- Awards: Merited Artist

Kujtim Çashku (born 5 August 1950) is an Albanian film director and screenwriter who has won numerous awards at international film festivals, including the Critics Prize at the 1996 Bastia Mediterranean Film Festival and the UNESCO Award at the 1998 Venice Film Festival for Colonel Bunker, the Best Screenplay Award, the FIRESCI Prize and the Silver Pyramid at the 2005 Cairo International Film Festival as well as the Bronze Palm at the Valencia Festival of Mediterranean Cinema for The Magic Eye, and the CEI Award at the Trieste Film Festival for his "brave commitment to the development of Albanian cinema". He is the founder and director of Tirana's Marubi Film & Multimedia School, the first film university in Albania, as well as the supervisor of OraFilm, Albania's first film production company, and founder-organizer of Albania's first Human Rights Film Festival (IHRFFA).

== Career as filmmaker and educator ==
A native of Tirana, Kujtim Çashku studied at the city's Higher Institute of Arts as well as at Institute of Theater and Film Art in Bucharest and started in the filmmaking profession in 1975, working as an assistant director. During the succeeding years, as his career took him to France, Poland and Germany, he became, in the process, Albania's internationally best-known cinema personality for directing the 1989 romantic drama Ballad of Kurbin as well as for writing and directing the 1996 political drama Colonel Bunker, which became the official Albanian submission for the Academy Awards and won international prizes, including the 1998 prestigious CIFT ETC Enrico Fulghinoni in Venice. His most publicized international success came with the 2005 road movie, Magic Eye, which won 9 international awards, including FIPRESCI 2005, "Silver Pyramid" for Best Screen Play and Best Actor at the 2005 Cairo International Film Festival, "Bronze Palm" for Best Cinematography and Best Music at 2006 Mostra Valencia, as well as CEI Award and Third Best Film Audience Award at 2007 Trieste International Film Festival.

== Filmography ==
- 1976 Pranverë në zemrat tona [Spring in Our Hearts] (documentary)
- 1977 Ata ishin katër [They Were Only Four] with Esat Musliu
- 1979 Ballë për ballë [Face to Face] with Piro Milkani
- 1980 Pas vdekjes[After Death]
- 1982 Shokët [Comrades]
- 1983 Dora e ngrohtë [A Man's Handshake]
- 1985 Të paftuarit [The Uninvited] based on the writings of Ismail Kadare
- 1987 Vrasje ne gjueti [Killing During a Hunt]
- 1989 Balada e Kurbinit [Ballad of Kurbin]
- 1996 Kolonel Bunker [Colonel Bunker]
- 2004 Syri magjik [The Magic Eye]

=== Screenplays ===
- 1996 Koloneli Bunker [Colonel Bunker]
- 2003 Equinox
- 2004 Syri magjik [The Magic Eye]
