= Reshat Arbana =

Albanian actor (born 1940)

- Born: 15 September 1940 (age 85); Tirana, Italian-occupied Albania
- Occupation: Actor
- Years active: 1963–present
- Spouse: Afërdita Arbana (m. 1968; died 2023)
- Children: 1
- Awards: People's Artist

Reshat Arbana (born 15 September 1940) is an Albanian actor. His great voice, talent and numerous performances of different characters in films and theatre, made him to awarded as People's Artist of Albania.

== Career ==
Arbana's first role was in 1963. After he finished his studies at the acting school Aleksander Mojsiu, near the National Theatre of Albania, in 1967 he appeared in Duel i Heshturin. In 1968 Arbana started to work at Radio Tirana. From 1977 until he retired, he worked as an actor at the National Theatre.

Arbana has been distinguished for his masterful interpretation of his roles. For his acting merits he has gained the People's Artist of Albania award.

Arbana married his wife Afërdita, she died at the age of 79 in December 2023.
