= List of Albanian film directors =

This is a list of Albanian film directors.

== Male directors ==
- Gëzim Erebara (1929-2007)
- Hysen Hakani (1932-2011)
- Kristaq Dhamo (1933)
- Saim Kokona (1934)
- Dhimitër Anagnosti (1936)
- Ibrahim Muçaj (1944-2010)
- Saimir Kumbaro (1945)
- Kujtim Gjonaj (1946)
- Kristaq Mitro (1948)
- Isa Qosja (1949)
- Kujtim Çashku (1950)
- Edmond Budina (1952)
- Zehrudin Dokle (1952)
- Leon Qafzezi (1953)
- Shaqir Veseli (1957)
- Besnik Bisha (1958)
- Xhovalin Delia (1959)
- Arian Çuliqi (1960)
- Gjergj Xhuvani (1963)
- Genti Bejko (1980)

== Female directors ==
- Xhanfize Keko (1928-2007)
- Shqipe N. Duka (1980)
- Luljeta Hoxha
- Drita Koci

== Albanian-American directors ==
- Stan Dragoti (1932)
- Valmir Tertini IMDb
- Thomas Logoreci
- Vilma Zenelaj
- Greta Zenelaj
