= Ferial Alibali =

Albanian actress

- Born: Ferial Meçule; 10 January 1933; Lushnjë, Albania
- Died: 14 May 2011 (aged 78); Tirana, Albania
- Occupation: Actress
- Years active: 1952–1975
- Spouse: Xhevat Alibali
- Children: 2

Ferial Alibali (née Meçule; 10 January 1933 – 14 May 2011) was an Albanian stage actress who performed more than 100 roles during her acting career. She was one of the founders of the Aleksandër Moisiu Theatre in Durrës. Two years later, she went to the Albanian National Theatre.

== Biography ==
Ferial Alibali was born in Lushnjë, Albania on 10 January 1933. She first started her acting career in 1952 at the Professional Theater of Korçë. In 1955 she played her first roles in the Aleksandër Moisiu Theatre of Durrës. The play was the opening play of the theater. In 1975, her husband was arrested by the communist regime and she was barred from participating in the artistic life. She has been honoured by President Bamir Topi and several other public institutions with medals regarding her career. She died at the age of 78 on 14 May 2011 in Tirana.

== Acting career ==
Only few roles have been presented.

Aleksandër Moisiu Theatre
Role	Production	Year	Notes
The Girl	Vajza Nga Fshati (The Girl From The Village)	1953	Leading Role

The National Theatre
Role	Production	Year(s)	Notes
Pepita	Era e Lirë (The Free Wind)	1956	
Masha	Orët e Kremlinit	1957	
Zoga	Cuca e Maleve	1970	
Drandja		1970	
Nica	Gjenerali i Ushtrisë së Vdekur (The General of the Dead Army)	1971	Based on the Ismail Kadare novel of the same name.
Hesja			
Nastja			
Mira			
Hajria			

Filmography
Role	Film	Director	Year	Notes
Safa Hymer's wife	Malet Me Blerim Mbuluar (Mountains Covered In Verdure)	Dhimitër Anagnosti	1971	Cameo
