= Anagnosti =

Anagnosti is a surname. Notable people with the surname include:

- Dhimitër Anagnosti (1936–2025), Albanian film director, screenwriter, cinematographer, and politician
- Roza Anagnosti (born 1943), Albanian actress
