= Besa e kuqe =

1982 film

- Directed by: Pirro Milikani
- Written by: Dhimitër Anagnosti; Vath Koreshi
- Starring: Roza Anagnosti; Ilirjan Fatkoja; Xhevdet Ferri
- Cinematography: Aleksandër Kasneci
- Music by: Zef Çoba
- Production company: Albafilm-Tirana
- Distributed by: Albafilm-Tirana
- Release date: March 28, 1982
- Country: Albania
- Language: Albanian

Besa e kuqe (The red pledge) is a 1982 Albanian film. It was directed by Pirro Milkani with music by Zef Çoba.

== Plot ==
The movie tells the true story of five World War II partisan fighters who give their lives, showing their last days and a bloody struggle against forces supported by fascism close to the village of Vigu.

== Cast ==
- Roza Anagnosti
- Ilirjan Fatkoja
- Xhevdet Ferri
- Astrit Hasani
- Elez Kadrija
- Tinka Kurti
- Eduard Makri
- Robert Ndrenika
- Petrit Malaj
- Bep Shiroka
- David Elmasllari

== See also ==
- Besa (Albanian culture)
