= A Tale from the Past =

- Directed by: Dhimitër Anagnosti
- Written by: Dhimitër Anagnosti
- Based on: A Bridegroom at Fourteen by Andon Zako Çajupi
- Starring: Elvira Diamanti; Admir Sorra; Robert Ndrenika; Hajrie Rondo
- Cinematography: Pëllumb Kallfa
- Music by: Limos Dizdari
- Distributed by: Albafilm
- Release date: 1987
- Running time: 86 minutes
- Country: Albania
- Language: Albanian

A Tale from the Past (Albanian: Përrallë nga e kaluara) is a 1987 Albanian historic comedy film directed by Dhimitër Anagnosti. Based on the book A Bridegroom at Fourteen by Andon Zako Çajupi.

== Cast ==
- Elvira Diamanti as Marigo
- Admir Sorra as Gjino
- Robert Ndrenika as Vangjel
- Hajrie Rondo as Tana
- Xhevdet Ferri as Trim
- Mimika Luca as Marigo's Mother
- Xhemil Tagani as The Priest
- Mira Minga as Kotja
- Mehdi Malkaj as Milua
