= Qortimet e vjeshtës =

- Directed by: Kristaq Dhamo
- Written by: Peçi Dado
- Starring: Kastriot Çaushi; Sulejman Dibra
- Cinematography: Bashkim Asllani
- Music by: Limos Dizdari
- Distributed by: Albafilm-Tirana
- Release date: May 3, 1981
- Running time: 93 minutes
- Country: Albania
- Language: Albanian

Qortimet e vjeshtës (Autumn's Approach) is a 1981 Albanian drama film directed by Kristaq Dhamo and written by Peçi Dado.

== Cast ==
- Kastriot Çaushi
- Sulejman Dibra
- Tinka Kurti
- Ndrek Luca
- Prela Ndrek
