= Tinka =

Tinka is a given name. Notable people with the name include:

- Tinka Kurti (born 1932), Albanian actress
- Tinka Menkes (born 1955), American actor, sister of filmmaker Nina Menkes
- Tinka Milinović (born 1973), Bosnian-American recording artist
