= Melpomeni Çobani =

Albanian actress

- Born: Melpomeni Mihal Çubonja; 6 June 1928; Tirana, Albania
- Died: 26 October 2016 (aged 88); Tirana, Albania
- Occupation: Actress
- Awards: People's Artist Merited Artist

Melpomeni Mihal Çubonja (6 June 1928 – 26 October 2016) was an Albanian actress and an honored People's Artist of Albania. She has starred in films such as Tana (1958), Estrada në ekran (1968) and Kapedani (1972).

== Biography ==
Çobani was born Melpomeni Mihal Çubonja in the Kavaja Street of Tirana. Due to her involvement with the Albanian resistance at an early age, her last name was changed to Çobani to avoid an imminent arrest from the German authorities. Soon after she passed in illegally and joined the ranks of the partisans.

After the end of World War II, she started with the amateur theatrical group of Tirana, while working at the "Mihal Duri" establishment. The painter Hasan Reçi came to see her potential and included her in the theater of Tirana. In 1948, she was offered an intern position with the National Theater of Albania with the assistance of director Pandi Stillu. Meanwhile she graduated from the two-year curriculum High Artistic School (Shkolla e Lartë Dyvjeçare) affiliated with the National Theater. From then she would start to get more important roles, as Qazim Mulleti's wife in the Prefekti comedy. In 1950, she was part of the team appointed to create the Puppet Theater (Teatri i Kukullave), and two years later the State Estrada (Estrada Shtetërore). Few years later she would stop splitting her time between theater and puppet shows, and move definitely as part of the "Estrada". She would receive the titles "Merited Artist" in 1961 and "People's Artist" in 1976.
Her last role was in 1996, in the comedy 8 Persona Plus with Agim Qirjaqi as director. She counts over 300 roles in her career, including dramas, comedies, and movies.

== Awards ==
For her participation in the World War II resistance:

- Medal of Bravery (Urdhri i Trimërisë dhe Medalja e Trimërisë)
- Medal of Remembrance (Medalja e kujtimit)

For her artistic activity

- Merited Artist (Artiste e Merituar), 1961
- People's Artist (Artiste e Popullit), 1976
