= Botë e padukshme =

- Directed by: Kristaq Dhamo
- Written by: Kristaq Dhamo; Vath Koreshi
- Produced by: Kristaq Dhamo
- Cinematography: Ilia Terpini
- Edited by: Shazie Kapoli
- Music by: Aleksandër Peçi
- Distributed by: Albafilm-Tirana
- Release date: 1987
- Running time: 88 minutes
- Country: Albania
- Language: Albanian

Botë e padukshme is a 1987 Albanian drama film directed and written by Kristaq Dhamo with Vath Koreshi.

== Plot ==
When the majority of patients in the hospital begin to deteriorate, Iljazi, the head physician, decides to look into the cause of a young nurse's inadvertent error regarding auto vaccines.

== Cast ==
- Eva Alikaj
- Roza Anagnosti
- Vangjel Heba
- Robert Ndrenika
- Stavri Shkurti
- Kristaq Skrami
