= Dokle =

Dokle is a surname. Notable people with the surname include:

- Namik Dokle (born 1946), Albanian politician
- Zehrudin Dokle (born 1952), Albanian actor and director
