= Albert Vërria =

Albanian actor (1936–2015)

- Born: Albert Vërria; 3 September 1936; Fier, Kingdom of Albania
- Died: 17 August 2015 (aged 78); Vlorë, Albania
- Awards: People's Artist

Albert Vërria (Fier, 3 September 1936 – Vlorë, 17 August 2015) was an Albanian actor. He was a Merited Artist of Albania.

Vërria was of ethnic Aromanian origin. He completed his primary and secondary school in his hometown. In 1963 he completed the high school for actor "Alexander Moisiu" in Tirana. He worked as a professional actor at the "Petro Marko Theater" in Vlorë. During this period he played over 90 roles in theatre pieces and over 40 roles in films. He has been honoured with many awards and medals at national festivals.

== Filmography ==
- Trapi i Vjetër - (2005)
- Misioni përtej detit - (1988)
- Në emër të lirisë - (1987)
- Rrethimi i vogël - (1986)
- Melodi e pandërprerë - (1985)
- Ditë të qytetit tim - (1982) (TV)
- Goditja - (1980) (TV)
- Përtej mureve të gurta - (1979)
- "Koncert në vitin 1936" - (1978)
- Nga mesi i errësirës - (1978)
- I treti - (1978)
- Thirrja - (1976)
- Në fillim të verës - (1975)
- Shtigje të luftës - (1974)
- Shpërthimi - (1974)
- Operacioni zjarri - (1973)
- Brazdat - (1973)
- Kapedani - (1972)
- Kur zbardhi një ditë - (1971)
- I teti në bronz - (1970)
