= Luljeta Hoxha =

Albanian actress and director

- Born: Tirana, Albania
- Occupations: Stage director, actress

Luljeta Hoxha is an Albanian actress and director. After she finished at Asim Vokshi High School for foreign languages in the English branch, in Tirana, she pursued her studies at the University of Arts of Albania, as the faculty of Performing Arts, Theatre Director branch, Major Director.

== Theater ==
Luljeta Hoxha has staged essential theater plays of important authors in worldwide dramaturgy. In addition she is an active director in various cultural and artistic activities.

- The Fall of the House of Usher by Edgar Allan Poe at the National Theatre of Albania (director)
- Miss Julie by August Strindberg with a new artistic point of view at National Theatre of Albania
- The Crucible by Arthur Miller at the National Theatre of Albania (assistant director)
- Doruntine by Ismail Kadare at Aleksandër Moisiu Theatre(actress).
- Miss Julie by August Strindberg in the Central Stage of the University of Arts of Albania
- Rose scarlatte by Aldo De Benedetti at the National Theatre of Albania (actress)
- Good and sexy by Woody Allen in the Black Box Theater of the University of Arts of Albania
- The first and the last by John Galsworthy at the Black Box Theater of the University of Arts of Albania
- Fear and Misery of the Third Reich - The Jewish wife by Bertolt Brecht at the Black Box Theater of the University of Arts of Albania
- The Lying Kind by Anthony Neilson at Aleksandër Moisiu Theatre
- The flames of the soul by Odise Plaku at Aleksandër Moisiu Theatre
- Sofra Tiranase from Tirana Cultural Association at Palace of Congresses (assistant director)

== Filmography ==
- Stage Lights short film by Lorin Terezi
