= Pjetër Gjoka =

Albanian actor (1912–1982)

- Born: 3 August 1912; Ulcinj, Kingdom of Montenegro
- Died: 12 May 1982 (aged 69); Tirana, PSR Albania
- Occupation: Actor
- Years active: 1929–1981
- Awards: People's Artist

Pjetër Gjoka (3 August 1912 – 12 May 1982) was an Albanian film and theatre actor.

He started his theatre activity with the amateur groups in Shkodër in 1929. In 1947 he started to work as a full-time actor in the National Theatre of Albania after his debut in the Army Theatre. His first role was in Molière's Tartuffe. He acted in around 90 roles during his career and he was active for around 52 years, acting even when he was almost completely blind. Some of his most acclaimed roles were those of Kharitonov, Shpend Gjeta, The Old Man (Plaku), MacDonald, Miller, Zabeliku, Klaudi, King Lear, Gjini and Ali Pasha of Gucia.

In 1961 he was one of the first four actors who was given the title of People's Artist of Albania. He also acted some artistic movies, creating very strong characters. His last role in the National Theatre of Albania was in the drama, Time before the Trial ("Epoka para gjyqit").

Along with his work as a stage actor he was also a movie actor, a director and a translator.

== Role in movies ==
- 1953: The Great Warrior Skanderbeg
- 1957: Femijet e saj
- 1958: Tana
- 1959: Furtuna
- 1969: Njesit gueril
- 1970: Gjurma
- 1975: Gjenerali i ushtrisë së vdekur
- 1978: I treti
- 1978: Yje mbi Drin
- 1981: Në prag të lirisë
