= Tana (film) =

1958 film by Kristaq Dhamo

- Film poster
- Directed by: Kristaq Dhamo
- Written by: Fatmir Gjata; Nasho Jorgaqi
- Based on: Tana by Fatmir Gjata
- Produced by: Llazar Lipivani; Teodor Siliqi
- Starring: Tinka Kurti; Naim Frashëri; Pjetër Gjoka; Kadri Roshi; Andon Pano; Thimi Filipi; Marie Logoreci
- Cinematography: Mandi Koçi; Sokrat Musha
- Edited by: Vitori Çeli
- Music by: Çesk Zadeja
- Production company: Kinostudio
- Release date: 17 July 1958 (Albania)
- Running time: 82 minutes
- Country: Albania
- Language: Albanian

Tana is a 1958 Albanian feature film directed by Kristaq Dhamo and written by Fatmir Gjata and Nasho Jorgaqi based on Gjata's novel of the same name. Tana was the first feature film entirely produced by Albania, with prior films relying on the Soviet Union.

== Plot ==
Gjata had written a novel with the same title earlier. The events evolve in the 1950s. The main character, Tana, is a smart, outgoing and progressive young woman. She is in love with Stefan (Naim Frashëri) and they both live in an unnamed mountain village in Albania. Tana has to face the old mentality of her old grandfather, and she also has to fight the jealousy of Lefter (Kadri Roshi). It is a love game, while socialist progress is highlighted, as is often the case in socialist realism.

== Cast ==
- Tinka Kurti as Tana
- Naim Frashëri as Stefani
- Pjetër Gjoka as the Grandfather
- Kadri Roshi as Lefter Dhosi
- Andon Pano as the Cooperative Chief
- Thimi Filipi as Party's secretary
- Marie Logoreci as Stefan's Mother
- Violeta Manushi
- Nikolla Panajoti
- Melpomeni Çobani
- Mihal Stefa
- Vani Trako
- Lazër Filipi
- Pandi Raidhi
- Lazër Vlashi
- Esma Agolli

== Production ==
Prior feature films in Albania was produced with significant involvement from the Soviet Union, but Tana was the first feature film entirely produced by Albanians and was the first film produced by Kinostudio. It was an adaption of a novel of the same name by Fatmir Gjata.

It was directed by Kristaq Dhamo and written by Fatmir Gjata and Nasho Jorgaqi. Irena Harito was the editor and Çesk Zadeja composed the music for the film. Filming was done in Tirana and Korçë. Mandi Koçi , one of the cinematographers, was later sent to prison for 20 years and his name was removed from the credits of Tana with green tape covering his name. It took 29 takes to film a kissing scene which was later removed.

== Release ==
Tana premiered on 17 July 1958, and was shown at the 1st Moscow International Film Festival. It was also released in China. The Central State Film Archive started work on a restortation of the film in 2020, and premiered the restoration at the Lumière Festival on 18 October 2022.

== Works cited ==
=== Books ===
- Prifti, Peter (1978). Socialist Albania since 1944: Domestic and Foreign Developments. MIT Press. ISBN 0262160706.
- Taylor, Richard; Wood, Nancy; Graffy, Julian; Iordanova, Dina, eds. (2000). The BFI Companion to Eastern European and Russian Cinema. British Film Institute. ISBN 0851707521.
- Williams, Bruce (2023). Albanian Cinema through the Fall of Communism: Silver Screens and Red Flags. Amsterdam University Press. ISBN 9789048529339.

=== News ===
- "The European premiere of the restored film "Tana" produced in 1958, at the International Film Festival "Lumiere" in France". Gazeta Sot. 19 October 2022. Archived from the original on 8 April 2025.
- "The first kiss in Albanian cinematography". Telegrafi. 2018. Archived from the original on 8 April 2025.
- "The restoration of the first Albanian film "TANA" begins". Koha Ditore. 21 December 2020. Archived from the original on 8 April 2025.
- Rowland, Maire (2016). "Albanian film history in pictures". Tirana Times. Archived from the original on 8 April 2025.

=== Web ===
- "1959 year". Moscow International Film Festival. Archived from the original on 16 January 2013.
- "Tana". Central State Film Archive. Archived from the original on 8 April 2025.
