= Xhuvani =

Xhuvani is an Albanian surname. Notable people with the surname include:

- Aleksandër Xhuvani (1880–1961), Albanian educator
- Dhimitër Xhuvani (1934–2009), Albanian writer
- Gjergj Xhuvani (1963–2019), Albanian film director
- Visarion Xhuvani (1890–1965), Primate of the Autocephalic Albanian Orthodox Church

== See also ==
- Aleksandër Xhuvani University, Albanian university
