= National Theatre (Albania) =

Former theatre in Tirana, Albania

- Teatri Kombëtar
- Interactive map of National Theatre
- Address: Tirana; Albania
- Coordinates: 41.3265°N 19.8205°E
- Owner: State owned

Construction
- Opened: 1939
- Demolished: 2020

Website
- tkob.gov.al

The National Theatre of Albania (Albanian: Teatri Kombëtar) was the main theatre in Tirana, Albania. In March 2020, the National Theatre of Albania was selected by Europa Nostra among the 7 most endangered monuments in Europe, as an exceptional example of modern Italian architecture from the 1930s and one of the most prominent cultural centers in Albania, facing impending threat of demolition. On 17 May 2020, the National Theatre building was demolished.

== History ==
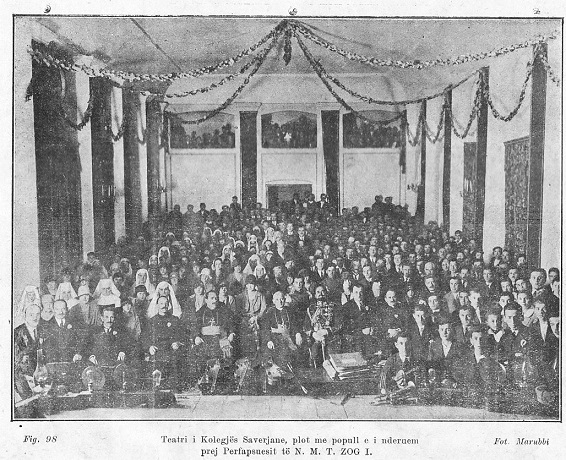
Interior view of Teatri i Kolegjit Severian in Shkodër, built in 1890.

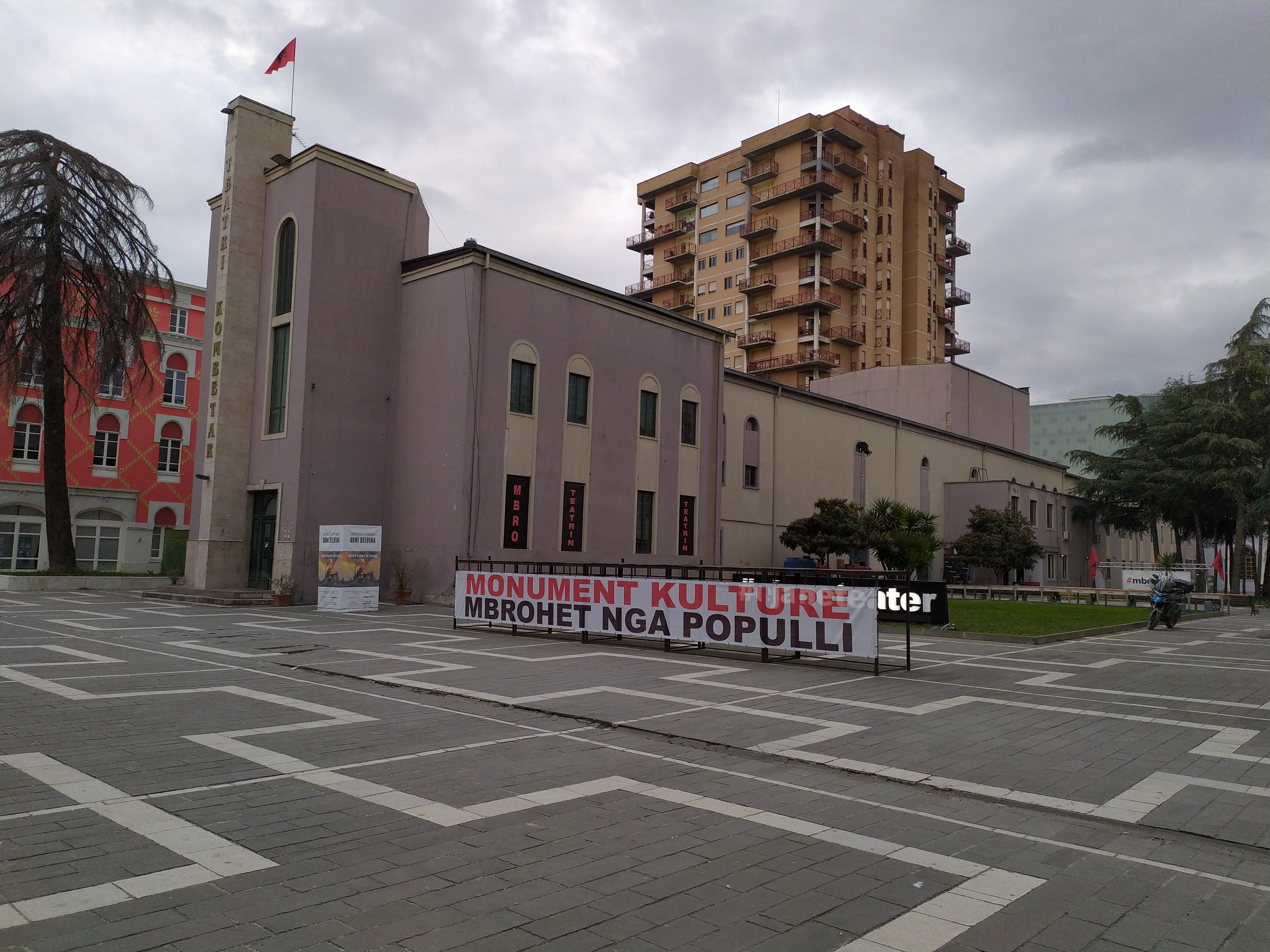

The first theatre play in Albania was organised in Gjirokastër in 1874. The first theatre building Salla e Kolegjit Severian with 450 seats was built in Shkodër in 1890, by the Order of Jesuits.

The National and Experimental Theater Complex was a historical artifact that witnessed many events related to the creation of the Albanian theater, but has also served as the stage for artistic, academic, and political events in post-World War II Albania.

The complex presented various historical layers of interventions that attested to different architectural and engineering styles and approaches of the time. It represented an important stage in the history of urban planning and modern architecture, especially after the long Ottoman period that did not include such concepts of urban planning.

The National Theater building started as the Italian-Albanian Circle named "Circolo Scanderbeg". Until its demolition, it was the first construction of a cultural and sport complex that preserved its cultural function. The materials and techniques applied in this construction were considered innovative for Italy and beyond at European level.

After its opening, the "Savoy" Theater, known in the 1940s as Kino-Theater "Kosova", became the centre, where the most important cultural institutions would be established in post-war Albania. Given these historical facts, this architectural complex was part of the country's cultural and national identity.

The innovative materials — most specifically a material called "Populit" panels, a new material composed of mineralized wood fibers with high strength concrete, was thermally and acoustically insulating. — and techniques applied in this construction were not only used in Albania, but were also considered for Italy and beyond at European level.

After its opening, the "Savoy" Theater, known in the 1940s as the Theater of Kosovo, after 1945 (at the end of World War II) as "the National" and "National Theater" in modern times, became the center where some of the most important cultural institutions would be established in post-war Albania. Given these historical facts, this architectural complex is part of the country's cultural and national identity.

The interventions of 1950–1954 proved the engagement of some of the most prominent architects after World War II in the country, such as A. Lufi, S. Pashallari, and others. Also, the presence of working groups of Soviet architects like D. Vasiliev shows the impact of Soviet neoclassicism on the increased volume of internal courtyard closure, which remained in good shape until the building's destruction.

Engineers and architects engaged in additional projects and structures (after 1945) and the solutions they apply demonstrate not only their care for the harmonization of the structures of the different phases, but at the same time these interventions prove to us today the political changes in the country by applying techniques and materials different it's former period.

The complex was a turning point on the monumental axis, as it is the first rationalist object after a period of neoclassical construction. It is also one of the first rationalist buildings in Albania. The facility was first realized with prefabricated elements and innovative materials at the time, not only in Albania but also beyond. The cultural and sports complex is also the first facility with the pool still existing in the atrium. Scholars classify it as a rationalist building with the influences of Sant Elia and De Chirico's futurism and paintings.

It was later called the Kosovo Movie Theater (Albanian: Kinema Teater Kosova). The inauguration and naming to Professional Theater of the State (Albanian: Teatër Profesionist i Shtetit) occurred on 24 May 1945. Later the theater was called Popular Theater (Albanian: Teatri Popullor). It held that name until June 1991 when it was called 'National Theater'.

=== Protest and demolition ===
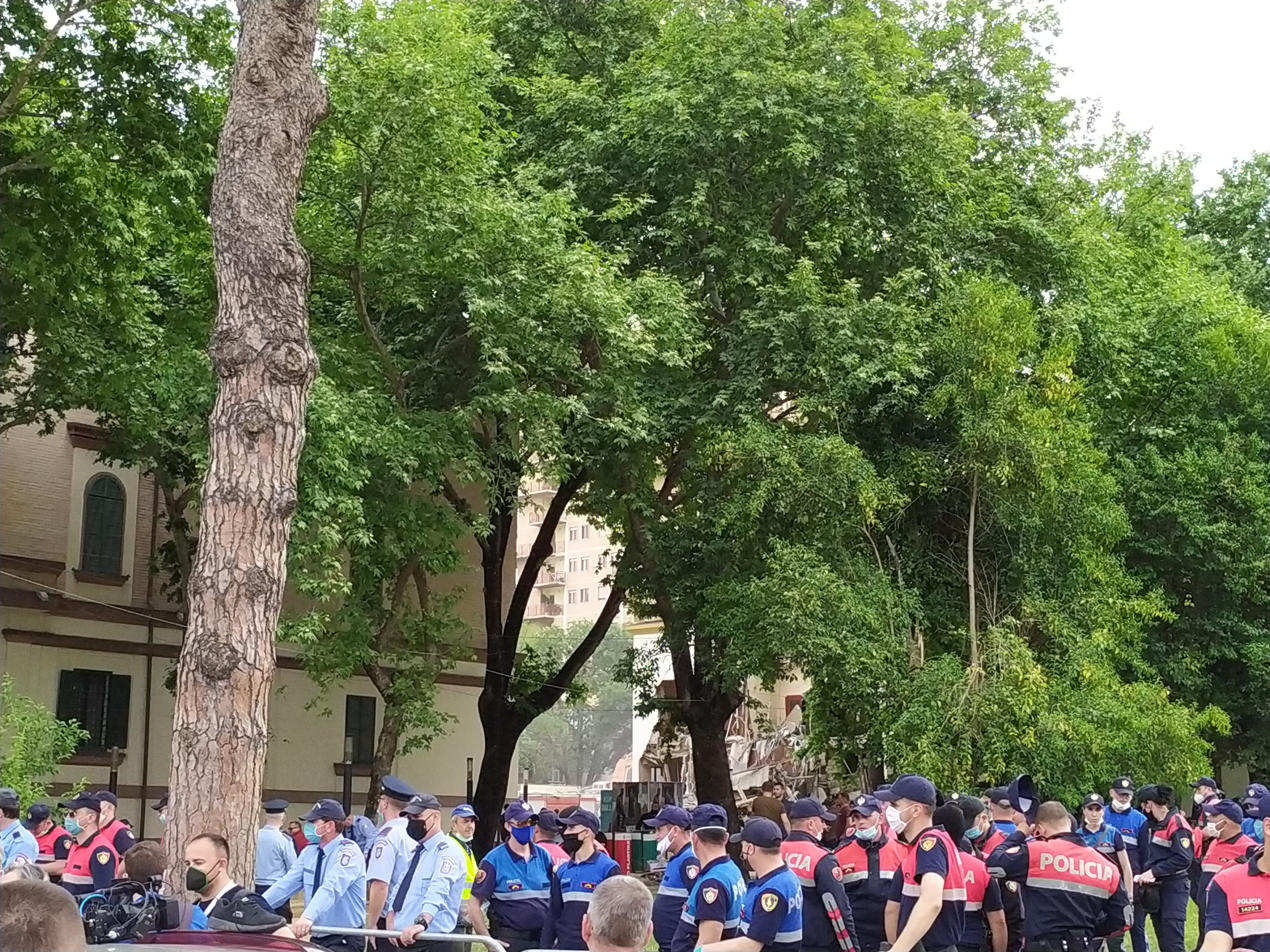
The demolition of the Albanian National Theater building in 2020

In 2018, the Albanian government, under Prime Minister Edi Rama, decided to demolish and replace the theater with a new building designed by Bjarke Ingels Group. The National Theatre was relocated to a temporary modern venue named ArTurbina located on Sami Frasheri Street in Tirana.

Plans of the authorities for a new building for the national theater were criticized by artists, professionals and citizens, which led to protests, a largely signed open letter and also the declaration of the historic building as one of the 7 Most Endangered Heritage Sites in Europe by Europa Nostra. In May 2020, more than 20 Members of the European Parliament, including Michael Gahler, David Lega, Johann Wadephul, Doris Pack and Ramona Strugariu, condemned the planned demolition of the historical building. The President of the European Council, Donald Tusk, along with the Swedish, German and British Embassies in Tirana, spoke against it as well.

National Theater is considered one of the most significant monuments of autarchy period in Albania at the beginning of 20th century

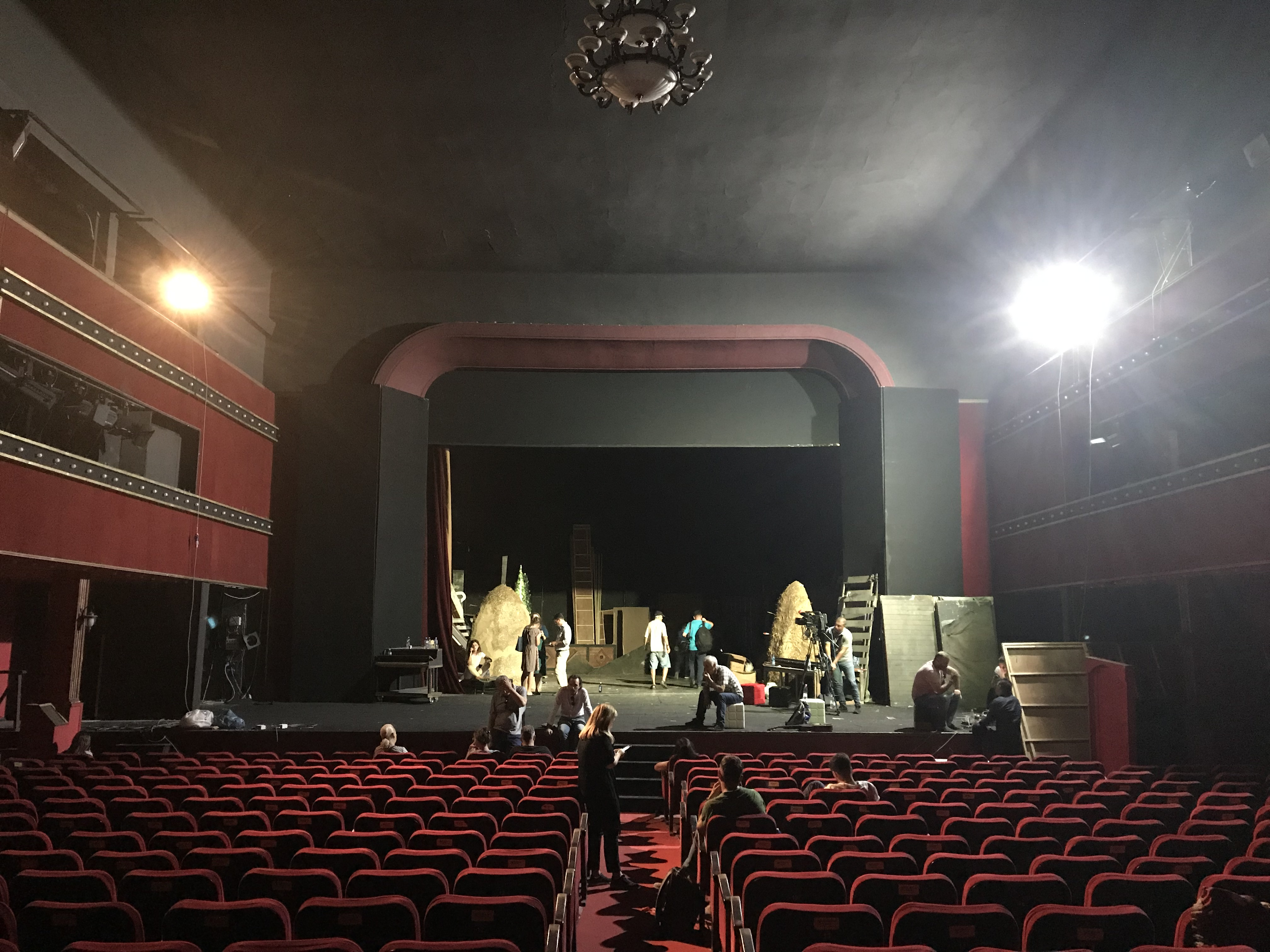
National Theatre of Albania photographed the day of the occupation by artists and actors

Regardless of constant protest by Albanian artists together with the political opposition, the demolition of the National Theatre of Albania started approximately on 4:30 am of the 17th of May 2020. The area was overrun by the State Police as they forcibly evacuated every person in the area protesting and detained many artists and high members of the Albanian opposition. Soon after the demolition started, people started gathering in the main boulevard just before the Ministry of Internal Affairs and the National Theatre to protest its demolition. This protest led to numerous other detainments due to the prohibition of gatherings and protests as per COVID-19 restrictions by the Government.

== Aftermath ==
On the 5th of May, 2023, the Tirana Municipal Council approved the transfer of a 1,266 sq.m plot next to the National Theater to Fusha, as part of a deal involving 50% of the floor space in any future constructions on the site. This decision aligned with a proposal made by Shkëlqim Fusha as early as 2020. However, in March 2024, it came to light that Fusha intended to construct a 23-story building on the property, contradicting previous guarantees made by Prime Minister Rama and Mayor Veliaj.

=== Staff ===
==== Playwrights ====
- Dionis Bubani
- Dritëro Agolli
- Fadil Paçrami
- Spiro Çomora
- Sulejman Pitarka
- Teodor Laço

==== Theatre Directors ====
- Andon Pano
- Andrea Malo
- Drita Agolli
- Esat Oktrova
- Kujtim Spahivogli
- Mihal Luarasi
- Pandi Stillu
- Pirro Mani
- Sokrat Mio
- Xhemal Broja
- Zina Andri
- Henri Çuli

==== Actors ====
- Agim Qirjaqi
- Ahmet Pasha
- Anastas Kristofori
- Andon Qesari
- Bujar Lako
- Antoneta Papapavli
- Besa Imami
- Drita Haxhiraj
- Drita Pelingu
- Edi Luarasi
- Edmond Budina
- Elia Zaharia
- Fatos Haxhiraj
- Ferial Alibali
- Genti Deçka
- Gjon Karma
- Ilia Shyti
- Laert Vasili
- Lazër Filipi
- Loro Kovaçi
- Luan Qerimi
- Kadri Roshi
- Sandër Prosi
- Margarita Xhepa
- Marie Logoreci
- Ndrek Luca
- Mihal Popi
- Ndriçim Xhepa
- Neritan Liçaj
- Pavlina Mani
- Reshat Arbana
- Robert Ndrenika
- Roland Trebicka
- Roza Anagnosti
- Pjetër Gjoka
- Prokop Mima
- Shkëlqim Basha
- Sulejman Pitarka
- Viktor Gjoka
- Violeta Manushi
- Yllka Mujo
- Ina Gjonci

=== Shows ===
- Our Land (Albanian: Toka Jonë)
- Hamlet (Albanian: Hamleti)
- The Mayor (Albanian: Prefekti)
- Intrigue and Love (Albanian: Intrigë e Dashuri)
- The Fisher's Family (Albanian: Familja e Peshkatarit)
- The Mountains' Girl (Albanian: Cuca e Maleve)
- A Bridegroom at Fourteen (Albanian: 14 vjec dhender)
- After Death (Albanian: Pas vdekjes)
- The Auditor (Albanian: Revizori)
- King Lear (Albanian: Mbreti Lir)
- Arturo Ui (Albanian: Arturo Ui)
- Korçë's Karnivals (Albanian: Karnavalet e Korçës)
- The Foreign Herth (Albanian: Votra e huej)
- The Fox and the Grapes (Albanian: Dhelpra dhe rrushte)
- Bernarda Alba (Albanian: E Vërteta e Spanjës”(Bernarda Alba))
- The Lady of the Inn (Albanian: Zonja e Bujtinës)
- Artan (Albanian: Artani)
- Everybody's Roof (Albanian: Çatija e të gjithëve)
- The Second Face (Albanian: Fytyra e dytë)
- Njeriu që pa vdekjen me sy (Albanian: Pas vdekjes)
- The General of the Dead Army (Albanian: Gjenerali i Ushtrisë së Vdekur)
- The seven people from Shale (Albanian: Shtate Shaljanet)
- The house on the Boulevard (Albanian: Shtëpia në Bulevard)
- The Lady from the City (Albanian: Zonja nga Qyteti)
- On the Trash (Albanian: Mbi Gërmadha)
- The servant of two Sires (Albanian: Shërbëtori i dy zotërinjve)
- The Big Flood (Albanian: Përmbytja e madhe)

== Theatres throughout Albania ==
Albania holds other theatres in Vlorë, Durrës, Shkodër, Fier, Gjirokastër, Berat and Korçë.

- Kujtim Spahivogli National Experimental Theater of Albania (Albanian: Teatri Kombetar Eksperimental "Kujtim Spahivogli") – Located in Tirana besides the National Theater, its venues are used by mainly young artists with several successful performances throughout the year.
- Children's Theatre (Albanian: Teatri i Kukullave) – The theatre is situated in the center of Tirana. The Albanian name literally means "The Puppet Theatre". The building used to serve as the Albanian parliament before World War II.

Another professional Children's theatre is in Korçë, under the A. Z. Çajupi Theatre.

== See also ==
- List of theatres in Albania
