= Marie Logoreci =

Albanian actress

Marie Logoreci HND
- Born: Marie Çurçija; 23 September 1920; Shkodër, Principality of Albania
- Died: 19 June 1988 (aged 67); Tirana, PSR Albania
- Occupation: Actress
- Years active: 1945–1978
- Spouse: Kolë Logoreci
- Children: 1
- Awards: People's Artist Merited Artist Honor of the Nation
- Website: marielogoreci.com

Marie Logoreci (born Çurçija; 23 September 1920 – 19 June 1988) was an Albanian actress. She started her career as a singer in Radio Tirana (1945), before making her breakthrough appearance as an actress in the film The Great Warrior Skanderbeg (1953). With all the successful performances made in film, she remained a great actress of the Albanian cinema and icon of the Albanian National Theater. For her contributions she has received honorary titles People's Artist of Albania (1975) and Honor of Nation Order (2015).

== Early life ==
Logoreci was born in Shkodër, Albania. Her father, Palok Çurçija, was a craftsman and her mother, Roza, was a housewife. Logoreci was very early introduced to home financial difficulties and to social dramas of the time also reflected in her family as well. She was enrolled at Stigmatine Sisters School of Shkodër, a girls school.

Later on, Logoreci joined the gymnasium. She was gifted at drawing and singing. During her singing she started to accompany herself with a mandolin and a guitar. She did not like mathematics and religious classes. From her childhood only 20 drawings have survived; they are witness of a mild and delicate spirit by showing a fine capture of the object, an observant eye, and a harmony in colors and precision. She also learned to speak Italian and Montenegrin as a child.

What mostly traced her soul were the popular narrations, legends and epic songs of the Northern Albania that she heard around her family. Her knowledge of the Albanian folklore and ethnography was soon to be her new passion. When she was 17 she moved permanently to Tirana.

She married Kolë Logoreci, an economist who had just come back from his studies in Vienna. As a hobby Kolë also was a member of Society of Friends of Music in Vienna, for almost five years getting lessons on violin. Kolë had a career as the Chief of State Budget Department. He was also a recipient of the high title Order of Skanderbeg.

Kolë was the son of Mati Logoreci, himself a very distinguished teacher and linguist, a man of high social reputation at his time. He was a descendant of the Logoreci family, whose name dates from the 1300s with the name Logoreseos.

== Artistic life ==
=== Singer at Radio Tirana ===
Logoreci's artistic life began as a singer for Radio Tirana in 1945 where she sang solo. She sang folk songs of Shkodër and Middle Albania in live radio broadcasts. Meanwhile, she attended a one-year study of canto at Tirana artistic lyceum under the guidance of soprano Jorgjia Filçe-Truja (People's Artist of Albania). Logoreci also made her appearance in various concerts in Albania and Bulgaria. She sang around 100 different songs in Radio Tirana during 1945–1947.

=== Stage acting ===
In 1947 she was a leading singer with the National Chorus, giving tour concerts in Albania and abroad. That same year she was offered the opportunity to play dramas as a lead actress in the National Theater of Albania.

As a stage actress she portrayed characters of disparate personality and psychology. Her performances explored the human psyche. She featured in the following works:

- As Alisa Lengton, the whimsical conservative and racist bourgeois lady in the play Deep Roots.
- As Gertrude, the suicidal queen in Hamlet.
- As Fatime, the woman experienced in court intrigues, servile and arrogant, in Halili and Hajria.
- As Bernarda Alba, the dark cold lady of The House of Bernarda Alba drama from Federico García Lorca.

Logoreci performed in 40 stage dramas. All her performances of Shakespeare's, of Molière's, of Lorca's, or Gorky's dramas, as well as them of the Albanian authors—Kole Jakova, Ndreke Luca etc.—demonstrated her particular artistic abilities. She had a clear knowledge of acoustics and achieved a virtuosity in her ability to bridge the gap between her and the audience. Her voice was marked with a great expression.

After a long career as an actress, she discovered an interest in directing, also making an important contribution in that field.

=== Film acting ===
Logoreci was one of the pioneers of the Albanian movies. She had a role in the very first Albanian movie, a short feature of about 12 minutes long, produced by the Albanian Film Studio and Albanian Television. The first important film she acted in was The Great Warrior Skanderbeg. The most unforgettable role played by her in a movie is that of "Loke" in Toka Jone (Our Land).

== Her art ==
Logoreci shaped her art by observing life carefully. She accumulated enough experience so she could input it later in her performances. In front of the spectators she created in stage the human soul, pain, protest, revolt, hate, cynicism, hypocrisy, and cunning; she offered them the magic of the play, what the real art can invoke. Her artistic lingo was expressive; her stage gestures demanded and were applied with masterly affection, and Logoreci gave life to all those performances signing up her individuality and personal stature in art.

== Filmography ==
- The Great Warrior Skanderbeg (1953)
- Fëmijet e saj (1957)
- Tana (1958)
- Detyrë e posaçme (1963)
- Toka jonë (1964)
- Oshëtimë në bregdet (1966)
- Njësiti guerril (1969)
- Operacioni Zjarri (1973)
- Gjenerali i Ushtrisë së Vdekur, TV (1976)
- Nga mesi i errësirës (1978)
- Dollia e dasmës sime (1978)
- Çeta e vogël (1979)

== Drama ==
Most known:

- The Russian Affair (1947) - Jessie
- Tartuffe (1947) - Elmire
- Deep Roots (1949) - Alisa Lengton
- The Plot of the Condemned (1950) - Christina Padera
- Halili and Hajria (1950) - Fatima
- Six Lovers (1952) - Alyona Patrovna
- Revizor (1952) - Lady Lukiç
- Toka Jonë (1954) - Loke
- Intrigue and Love (1957) - Lady Milford
- Seven Knights (1958) - Triga
- Hamlet (1960) - Gertrude
- The House of Bernarda Alba (1961) - Bernarda Alba
- The Moral of Madame Dulska (1962) - Tadrahova
- The Great Wall (1966) - Mother Jun
- The Perkolgjinajs (1966) - Mara
- Drita (1967) - Manushaqja - directed by Marie Logoreci
- The Lass of the Mountains (1967) - Prenda
- Everybody's Roof (1968) - The old woman
- The Big Drown (1977) - Gjela

== Awards and honorary titles ==
- Merited Artist (Artiste e Merituar), 1961
- Naim Frashëri Order (Urdhri "Naim Frashëri"), 1969
- People's Artist (Artiste e Popullit), 1975
- Honor of Nation Order (Nderi i Kombit), 2015

== See also ==
- List of famous Albanians
