= Pirro Mani =

Albanian actor (1932–2021)

- Born: 14 April 1932; Korçë, Kingdom of Albania
- Died: 3 June 2021 (aged 89); New York City, U.S.
- Occupations: Actor, director
- Years active: 1966–1994
- Spouse: Pavlina Mani
- Awards: People's Artist

Pirro Mani (14 April 1932 – 3 June 2021) was an Albanian actor and theatre director. He was one of the most prominent personalities in the history of Albanian theater. He worked at the National Theatre of Albania for 25 years.

== Biography ==
Mani studied at the State Institute of Theatrical Arts, GITIS, Moscow. After returning to his homeland, he was appointed director of the “A. Mr. Çajupi ”, Korça, which he managed for about eight years. From 1967 to 1992 he was the director of the National Theater, where he staged dozens of plays. In his artistic career he counts over 80 performances. He has been honored with many awards. He was known as a specialist in directing mass scenes, and of mise-en-scène. The best known of his performances are "Cuca e maleve", "The Second Face", "Arturo Ui", "The General of the Dead Army", "The Age Before the Trial", "The 12th Night", "Prometheus", etc. He has also been involved in several feature films. He was honored with the title "People's Artist". He lived in New York, US from 2002, together with his wife the actress Pavlina Mani and his family.

Mani died in New York on 3 June 2021.
