= Mao Tse Tung (film) =

2007 film

- Directed by: Besnik Bisha
- Written by: Besnik Mustafaj
- Produced by: Besnik Bisha
- Starring: Fadil Hasa
- Cinematography: Sebastiano Celeste
- Release date: 18 November 2007 (Greece)
- Running time: 91 minutes
- Country: Albania
- Language: Albanian

Mao Tse Tung (Albanian: Mao Ce Dun) is a 2007 Albanian comedy film directed by Besnik Bisha. It was entered into the 30th Moscow International Film Festival., attracting some international reviews. FIPRESCI's Francisco Ferreira praised the film stating that it "transcends its picturesque backdrops and its sui generis view of Marxism to reflect on the history and mythology of a nation" while Emanuel Levy reports on the "audiences' appreciative laughter."

== Cast ==
- Fadil Hasa as Hekuran Romalini
- Miola Sitaj as Sulltana Romalini
- Ola Sadiku as Xhina
- Marko Bitraku as Myslymi
- Vangjel Toçe as Tahiri
- Zehrudin Dokle as Abdiu
