= Zehrudin Dokle =

Albanian film director

- Born: 12 January 1952 (age 74); Borje
- Occupations: actor and director

Zehrudin Dokle (born in Borje, Kukës, Albania), is an Albanian actor and director.

== Biography ==
In 1970, he completed Professional High School "Politeknikumi 7 Nentori" (today Harry Fultz), where he took parts in theater activities as an amateur actor, under the supervision of Marie Logoreci. In 1974 he graduated from the Art Academy "Aleksander Moisiu" in Tirana. In 1986 Dokle completed a master's degree on "Dramaturgji dhe Kritike Teatrore" (Dramaturgy and acting critics). He is the Founder and leader of the Culture and Society Organization "Ivan Vazov". He also served as a member of the board organization of National Festival Theater of Butrint 2000, and many festivals after that.

Dokle is the brother of retired Albanian politician Namik Dokle.

Dokle has published two books: "Teknika e te folurit artistik" (Technics of artistic speaking), a textbook, and "Une recituesi i pashallareve te kuq" (I, the reciter of the Red Pashas), a collection of articles and critics for theater and filmography, both in 2004.

== Filmography ==
1973, director of the "Ora Gazmore" played in the national radio in Tirana, Albania.

1975–86, director of the "Professional Cultural Establishment" in Kukës.

1976, acted in the movie Tomka and his friends.

1977, acted in the movie "Shembja e Idhujve".

1977, acted in the movie "Guna Permbi Tela".

1982, acted in the movie "Besa e Kuqe".

1984, acted in the serial television "Agimet e Stines se Madhe".

1987–92, directed and acted in "Migjeni" theater in Shkodër.

1990, acted in the movie "Ngjyrat e Moshes".

2007, acted in "Mao Tse Tung" comedy, portraying Abdi.
