= List of theatres in Albania =

The following is a list of theatres in Albania.

== Theatres ==
Name	City	Founded	Capacity	Built	Architect	Image
National Theatre; Teatri Kombëtar	Tirana	17 May 1945	550 & 220 seats	—	Giulio Berté	
Migjeni Theatre; Teatri Migjeni	Shkodër	24 November 1949	500 seats	—	Anton Lufi	
National Theatre for Children; Teatri Kombëtar për Fëmijë	Tirana	27 October 1950	160 seats	1925	—	
Andon Zako Çajupi Theatre; Teatri Andon Zako Çajupi	Korçë	1950	400 seats	—	—	
Aleksandër Moisiu Theatre; Teatri Aleksandër Moisiu	Durrës	11 January 1953	301 seats	—	Valentina Pistoli	
Variety Show Theatre of Berat; Teatri i Estradës së Beratit	Berat	28 June 1957	—	—	—	
Variety Show Theatre of Sarandë; Teatri i Estradës së Sarandës	Sarandë	2 April 1962	—	—	Koço Çomi	
Skampa Theatre; Teatri Skampa	Elbasan	16 July 1962	292 seats	—	Halit Narazani	
Petro Marko Theatre; Teatri Petro Marko	Vlorë	16 November 1962	—	1977	—	
Zihni Sako Theatre; Teatri Zihni Sako	Gjirokastër	27 November 1968	—	—	—	
Bylis Theatre; Teatri Bylis	Fier	1971	400 seats	—	Sokrat Mosko	
Drama Theatre of Peshkopi; Teatri Dramatik i Peshkopisë	Peshkopi	May 1984	—	—	—	
Metropol Theatre; Teatri i Metropolit	Tirana	2008	220 seats	—	—	
Art-Turbina Theatre; Teatri Art-Turbina	Tirana	2 July 2018	400 & 150 seats	2018	—	
Kujtim Spahivogli National Experimental Theater; Teatri Kombetar Eksperimental “Kujtim Spahivogli”	Tirana		130 seats	—	—	—

== See also ==
- Lists of theatres
