= Fatmir Gjata =

Albanian writer

- Born: September 22, 1922; Korçë, Principality of Albania
- Died: 1989 (aged 66–67); Tirana, People's Socialist Republic of Albania
- Education: Maxim Gorky Literature Institute
- Occupations: Writer, journalist
- Writing career
- Genres: Fiction (novels, stories, screenplays), revolutionary songs
- Movement: Socialist Realism

Fatmir Gjata (September 22, 1922 – 1989) was a prominent Albanian writer of Socialist Realism.

== Life ==
Fatmir Gjata was born in Korçë, Albania, in 1922. His father, Isuf Gjata, was a teacher who joined the National Liberation Movement during World War II and fell in 1944. Fatmir Gjata studied in the French Lyceum of Korçë and later he attended the Maxim Gorky Literature Institute in Moscow. As a communist and a poet, he wrote several poetry volumes during World War II and later, some of which would become known partisan songs. During the war he was in charge of a local illegal newspaper. His poetry was embroidered with march-style enthusiasm and solemn lexicology.

He would claim his place in Albanian literature during 1950–90 period with his novels, theatrical plays, short story volumes and screenplays, some of which would turn into films such as Tana, the first Albanian movie.

Fatmir Gjata is also known for directing some of the most important institutes of art and culture in Communist Albania. He served as Chairman of the Committee for Arts and Culture, member of the Albanian League of Writers and Artists, editor-in-chief for 25 years of Nëntori literary magazine, journalist, and member of the collegial council for other press organs such as Zëri i Popullit, Drita, Ylli, Hosteni, etc. His work has been translated into other languages.

Many of his works received national prizes in Albania, such as "Republic's First Prize", "Order of the Flag of First Class", etc.

He died in Tirana, in 1989.

== Prominent works ==
- Këneta' (The Swamp), 1959 (novel)
- Këshilltarët (The Counselors), 1979 (novel)
- Në pragun e jetës (At the doorstep of life), 1960 (short stories)
- Fillim pranvere (Spring eve), 1977 (novel)
- Brezat (Generations), 1968 (novel)
- Tana, 1958 (novel)
- Përmbysja (The overthrow), 1954 (novel)
- Në tokën kineze-kujtime dhe tregime (In the Chinese land – memoirs and stories), 1958 (co-author with Sterjo Spasse)
- Me një torbë me fishekë: ditar (With a bagful of bullets: diary), 1982 (memoirs)
- Rrugës mes njerëzve të thjeshtë (In the streets among simple people), 1969 (stories collection)
- Heronjt e vigut (Heroes of Vig), 1959 (story)
- Armiqtë (The enemies), 1966 (novel)
