= Naim Frashëri (actor) =

Albanian actor (1923–1975)

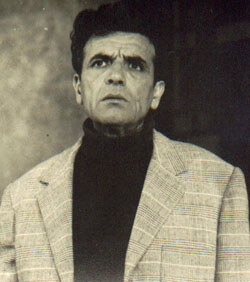
- Born: Naim Frashëri; 12 August 1923; Leskovik, Principality of Albania
- Died: 18 February 1975 (aged 51); Tirana, PR Albania
- Occupation: Actor
- Years active: 1945–1973
- Awards: People's Artist

Naim Frashëri (12 August 1923 – 18 February 1975) was an Albanian actor, known for portraying hundred roles in films and theaters like Othello, Hamlet, Sasha Ribakov and Jonuz Bruga. He was named a People's Artist of Albania.

== Career ==
Frashëri pursued secondary studies at Qemal Stafa High School, in Tirana, Albania. Frashëri's love for theater had already started in 1942, however he started his professional acting career at the beginning of 1945. Among his main roles are those of Tartuffe in Tartuffe, Smith in Russian Affair, Gjoni in Trimi i mirë me shokë shumë, The General in the General of the dead Army (Gjenerali i ushtrise së vdekur), Leka in Përkolgjinaj, Nikolla in The Enemies (Armiqtë), Sasha Ribakov in the Kremlin hours (Orët e Kremlinit), Luben in the Leipzig Trial (Proçesi i Lajpcigut), Ferdinand in Intrigue and Love, Howard in Deep roots, Hamlet in Hamlet, Jonuz Bruga in The Fisherman's Family (Familja e Peshkatarit).

The role of Jonuz Braga was his last one. He has acted in eight movies.

== Death ==
Frashëri was found unconscious the next morning by his wife, having suffered a heart attack and a stroke and died at the age of 51.

== Awards and honors ==
Naim Frashëri has received many titles and orders as one of the icons of the Albanian Theatre. In particular he is recipient of the Hero of Socialist Labour title ("Hero i punës socialiste") and the People's Artist of Albania title.

== Filmography ==
- Skënderbeu (1953) .... Pali
- Fëmijët e saj (1957, Short) .... Mësuesi
- Tana (1958) .... Stefani
- Furtuna (1959, Documentary) .... Qemali
- Ngadhnjim mbi vdekjen (1967) .... Hans von Shtolc
- Plagë të vjetra (1968) .... Doktor Pëllumbi
- Gjurma (1970) .... Doktor Artani (final film role)
