= Brazdat =

- Directed by: Kristaq Dhamo
- Written by: Dhimitër Xhuvani
- Starring: Astrit Çerma; Besa Imami
- Cinematography: Saim Kokona
- Music by: Shpëtim Kushta
- Distributed by: Albafilm-Tirana
- Release date: December 23, 1973
- Running time: 95 minutes
- Country: Albania
- Language: Albanian

Brazdat is a 1973 Albanian drama film directed by Kristaq Dhamo and written by Dhimitër Xhuvani.

== Plot ==
Marta is a young, vivacious girl who aspires to drive a tractor. At first, her husband, Adem, encourages her, but she soon learns that he is actually envious.

== Cast ==
- Astrit Çerma
- Besa Imami
- Muhamet Sherri
- Pandi Siku
- Elida Topçiu
- Suzana Zekthi
