= Nga mesi i errësirës =

- Directed by: Kristaq Dhamo
- Written by: Vath Koreshi; Neshat Tozaj
- Produced by: Fuat Çano
- Starring: Krenar Arifi; Ndrek Luca
- Cinematography: Petraq Lubonja
- Music by: Kujtim Laro
- Distributed by: Albafilm-Tirana
- Release date: November 16, 1978
- Running time: 101 minutes
- Country: Albania
- Language: Albanian

Nga mesi i errësirës ("From the midst of darkness") is a 1978 Albanian drama film directed by Kristaq Dhamo and written by Vath Koreshi.

== Cast ==
- Krenar Arifi
- Petrika Gjezi .... Gjergji
- Theofil Haxhijani
- Ndrek Luca
- Zhani Petro
- Albert Vërria
- Petraq Xhillari
- Fitim Makashi

== Sources ==
- "Filmi shqiptar 1977-1987". Tirana: Shtepia Botuese 8 Nentori, 1990, pp. 14–15.
- Abaz Hoxha, 2002: "Enciklopedia e kinematografise shqiptare. Autore & vepra". Tirana: Toena ISBN 99927-1-555-3
