= The Great Warrior Skanderbeg =

1953 Albanian-Soviet biopic of Skanderbeg

- Film poster
- Directed by: Sergei Yutkevich
- Written by: Mikhail Papava
- Starring: Akaki Khorava
- Cinematography: Yevgeniy Nikolayevich Andrikanis
- Edited by: Klavdiya Aleyeva
- Music by: Çesk Zadeja; Georgy Sviridov
- Distributed by: Artkino Pictures
- Release date: 28 November 1953
- Running time: 120 minutes
- Countries: Soviet Union; Albania
- Language: Albanian

The Great Warrior Skanderbeg (Albanian: Luftëtari i madh i Shqipërisë Skënderbeu; Russian: Великий воин Албании Скандербег, romanized: Velikiy voin Albanii Skanderbeg) is a 1953 Soviet-Albanian biopic directed by Sergei Yutkevich. It was entered into the 1954 Cannes Film Festival where it earned the International Prize. Yutkevich also earned the Special Mention award for his direction.

The film is a biography of George Kastriot Skanderbeg (1405–1468), widely known as Skanderbeg, a 15th-century Albanian lord who defended his land against the Ottoman Empire for more than two decades.

In 2012, for the 100th anniversary of Albanian independence, the film was remastered for high definition with new voices, music, and sound effects.

== Plot ==
A historical film about the Albanian people's struggle against Ottoman invaders in the 15th century, led by George Kastrioti, known to the Ottomans as Skanderbeg. The son of a prince, he was sent as a child hostage to the Ottoman Sultan, where he was raised as a warrior of the empire. After 20 years of serving the Ottoman throne, his love for his homeland drives him to rise against his oppressors.

== Cast ==
- Akaki Khorava as Gjergj Kastrioti / Skanderbeg (dubbed in Albanian by Lec Bushati)
- Nikolai Timofeyev as Italian poet
- Vladimir Solovyov as Franciscan friar
- Boris Tenin as Din
- Besa Imami as Donika Kastrioti
- Adivie Alibali as Mamica Kastrioti
- Naim Frashëri as Pal Muzaka (Karl Muzakë Thopia)
- Oleg Zhakov as Tanush Thopia
- Sergo Zakariadze as Laonikus
- Vladimir Belokurov as Đurađ Branković, Serbian King
- Sergei Kurilov as Lekë Zaharia
- Semyon Sokolovsky as Hamza Kastrioti
- Veriko Anjaparidze as Dafina (Voisava Kastrioti)
- Georgy Chernovolenko as Marash
- Alexander Vertinsky as Francesco Foscari, Doge of Venice
- Georgy Rumyantsev as Lekë Dukagjini
- Marie Logoreci as countess
- Vahram Papazian as Murad II (voiced by Yakov Belenky)
- Nodar Şaşıqoğlu as Mehmed II
- Yury Yakovlev as warrior

== Production ==
In April 1949, Enver Hoxha wrote to the Soviet Ministry of Foreign Affairs requesting that a film about Skanderbeg be made. The film started production in 1951. The Soviet Union paid for 80% of the production with Albania paying the remaining 20%. The Soviets decided to make a film about a national hero as they previously done in coproductions with the Mongolian People's Republic, China, and East Germany.

Most of the film was shot in the Soviet Union at the Mosfilm Studio and in Yalta, Sudak, and Kislovodsk. Some scenes were filmed in Albania such as Gjirokastër being used as Skanderbeg's stronghold in Krujë or scenes in Venice being filmed in the St. Procopius church of Tirana. The majority of the actors were from the Soviet Union, including the actor playing Skanderbeg. Vahram Papazian, an Armenian, played the Ottoman sultan.

The screenplay featured historical inaccuracies and anachronisms. The phrase "Science has no motherland" despite the word science not existing in the modern sense yet and Skanderbeg uses rice in a scene explaining his battle strategies. A scene of men smoking was removed as tobacco was not used in Albania at the time. The Albanians wanted to remove a scene in which Skanderbeg ends a local blood feud through peaceful methods as it was historically and culturally inaccurate, but it remained in the film. Historian Aleks Buda was a consultant for the film.

The original Albanian dub was considered to be of poor quality. Sergei Yutkevich criticized the monotone voice given to Skanderbeg and proposed that he should be voiced by Naim Frashëri. The film was redubbed in 2012 under the direction of Piro Milkani and Eno Milkani.

== Release ==
The Great Warrior Skanderbeg premiered in Moscow and Tirana on 28 November, the 44th anniversary of Albania's independence. It was shown at the 1954 Cannes Film Festival and won an international prize.

== Works cited ==
- Grgić, Ana (2021). "Building a new socialist art: a short history of Albanian cinema". Studies in Eastern European Cinema. 12 (3). Taylor & Francis: 276–92.
- Mëhilli, Elidor (2018). "Globalized Socialism, Nationalized Time: Soviet Films, Albanian Subjects, and Chinese Audiences across the Sino-Soviet Split". Slavic Review. 77 (3). Cambridge University Press: 611–37. doi:10.2307/26565651. JSTOR 26565651.
- Williams, Bruce (2023). Albanian Cinema through the Fall of Communism: Silver Screens and Red Flags. Amsterdam University Press. ISBN 9789048529339.
