= A Bridegroom at Fourteen =

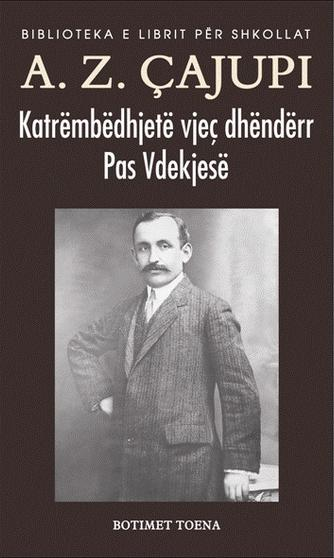
- Author: Andon Zako Çajupi
- Original title: Katërmbëdhjetë vjeç dhëndër
- Language: Albanian
- Genre: Comedy, satire
- Publication date: 1902
- Publication place: Albania
- Media type: Print (hardback & paperback)

Katërmbëdhjetë vjeç dhëndër (English: A Bridegroom at Fourteen) is an Albanian play by Andon Zako Çajupi. The four-act comedy was written in 1902 and published posthumously in 1930. The work, which was considered a critique on the custom of arranged marriage, was adapted to film in 1987.
