= Tinka Kurti =

Albanian actress (born 1932)

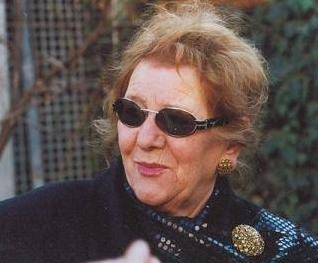
- Kurti in 2006
- Born: Tinka Ded Thani; 17 December 1932 (age 93); Sarajevo, Bosnia and Herzegovina (then Yugoslavia)
- Occupation: Actress
- Years active: 1948–present
- Spouse: Palok Kurti (m. 1951; died 1997)
- Children: 1 (deceased)
- Awards: People's Artist

Tinka Kurti (née Thani; born 17 December 1932) is an Albanian actress. Her body of work, spanning 60 years, includes more than 50 feature movies and 150 theatre plays has been awarded her with the People's Artist of Albania medal.

== Biography ==
Tinka was born in Sarajevo, Bosnia and Herzegovina (then part of the Kingdom of Yugoslavia) to an Albanian father and Hungarian mother. She was the oldest of four children. At a young age her family returned to the city of Shkodra in northern part of Albania. It is in Shkodra where she would spend most of her life and join the theatre at a young age.

In 1947 she was expelled from the Liceu Artistik (School of Arts) in Tirana and was never able to graduate. However, this did not stop her from pursuing her acting career. She made her first theatre appearance at the age of 16, a minor role, in the play Dasma Shkodrane (Wedding from Shkodra.) From 1949 she became a member of the Theatre Migjeni in Shkodra where she was part of over 120 plays (dramas and comedies). Such plays include "Gjaku i Arbrit", "Histori Irkutase", "Toka Jonë", "Fisheku në pajë" and "Fejesa e Çehovit".

Kurti did not limit herself only to theatre and decided to try film too. In 1958, she was chosen as the leading female role in the first Albanian feature film "Tana". What followed was an endless series of film roles that would rightfully make her name a treasure of Albanian art. Some include Mother Pashako in "Yjet e netëve të gjata", the Mother in Çifti i lumtur, Sinjorina Mançini in Vajzat me kordele të kuqe, the Grandmother in Zemra e Nënës.

Two cinemas in Tirana and Durrës are named after her. The same is the school of Lekbibaj (a village of Albania).

In 2003, the Albanian director, Esat Teliti, made a bibliographical documentary as a tribute to her life. It was simply named "Tinka".

Kurti continues her acting career. She once said: "I don't fear the old age, not even death. But, I do fear the senility of the brain, and when that moment will come, I think I would be dead twice. That's why I want to work."

== Personal life ==
Tinka was married with Palok Kurti in 1951 until his death in 1997. They had a son named Zef Kurti who died on March 6, 2018, at the age of 65 from a heart attack in Canada.

After her son's death in January 2022, she published her biographical book called "Diary of a husband"

On April 5, 2025, it was made known that Tinka Kurti resides in a nursing home in Tirana.

== Filmography ==
- Sophia – 2022
- Bota – 2014
- Në kërkim të kujt – 2012
- Alive – 2009
- Familjet (Families) – 2009
- Ne dhe Lenini (Lenin and Us) – 2009
- Mira – 2008/II
- Etjet e Kosovës (Kosova: Desperate Search) – 2006
- Nata (The night) – 1998
- Zemra e nënës (Mother's heart) – 1995
- Në emër të lirisë (In the name of freedom) – 1987
- Hije që mbeten pas (Shadows left behind) -1985
- Besa e kuqe (Red faith) – 1982
- Qortimet e vjeshtës (Autumn's reproach) – 1982
- Si gjithë të tjerët (Like all the others) -1981
- Mëngjeze të reja (New mornings) – 1980
- Nusja (The bride) – 1980
- Gjeneral gramafoni (The general gramophone) – 1978
- Vajzat me kordele të kuqe (Girls with red ribbons) – 1978
- Emblema e dikurshme – 1976
- Çifti i lumtur (The happy couple) – 1975
- Lumë drite (River of light) – 1975
- Operacion Zjarri (Fire operation) – 1973
- Yjet e netëve të gjata – (Stars of long nights) – 1972
- Guximtarët (The brave) – 1970
- Tana (Tana) – 1958
