= Saim Kokona =

Albanian filmmaker

Saim Kokona (26 February 1934 – 30 March 2012) was an Albanian cinematographer who was regarded as one of the most prolific in the cinema of Albania.

== Life and career ==
Saim Kokona was born in Gjirokastër, Albania on 26 February 1934. He began working in film in 1964 on Qemal Stafa and has undertaken the cinematography of over 40 films between then and 1990, working on major Albanian films such as Brazdat (1973) and Apasionata (1983).

Kokona retired from the industry in 1990, and died on 30 March 2012, at the age of 78 from Colon Cancer

== Filmography ==
- Babai i studentit (1988)
- Shpresa (1988)
- Sinjali i dashurisë (1988)
- Eja! (1987)
- Fjalë pa fund (1986)
- Mondi dhe Diana (1985)
- Të mos heshtësh (1985)
- Taulanti kërkon një motër (1984)
- Apasionata (1983)
- Dritat e qytezës (1983)
- Njeriu i mirë (1982)
- Dita e parë e emrimit (1981)
- Në prag të lirisë (1981)
- Sketerre 43 (1980)
- Balonat (1979)
- Radiostacioni (1979)
- Koncert në vitin 1936 (1978)
- Cirku në fshat (1977)
- Me studentët ushtarakë (1977)
- Shëmbja e idhujve (1977)
- Pylli i lirisë (1976)
- Beni ecën vetë (1975)
- Kursim, kursim, kursim (1975)
- Miq në festën tonë (1974)
- Shpërthimi (1974)
- Ata quheshin Arbër (1973)
- Brazdat (1973)
- Ndërgjegja (1972)
- Shkolla tingujt ngjyra (1972)
- Vështrim përmes mijëvjeçarëve (1972)
- Shkolla dhe rrugët e jetës (1971)
- Takim me artin revolucionar kinez (1971)
- Guximtarët (1970)
- Njësiti guerril (1969)
- Prita (1968)
- Në gjurmët partizane (1967)
- Ngadhnjim mbi vdekjen (1967) (known as Victory Over Death internationally)
- Në rjedhën e jetës (1965)
- Takim me Arbreshët (1965)
- Qemal Stafa (1964)
