= Kristaq Dhamo =

Albanian actor and film director (1933–2022)

- Born: 20 April 1933; Fier, Albania
- Died: 14 August 2022 (aged 89); Ancona, Italy
- Occupations: Actor; film director
- Years active: 1958–1987
- Awards: People's Artist

Kristaq Dhamo (20 April 1933 – 14 August 2022) was an Albanian film director. In 1979 he was awarded the title of "Merited Artist" and in 1987 he was honored with the title of People's Artist of Albania medal. At the 11th Albanian Film Festival in 2000, he was honored with the Career Award. One of his famous quotes was: “A society with a film industry is a society that can develop.” (“Një shoqëri me industri filmi, është një shoqëri që mund të zhvillohet”.)

He graduated from the Higher Institute of Cinematography in Budapest, Hungary. After his studies, he began working at the Film Studio-"Shqipëria e Re". His first directed movie at the age of 25 was Tana, which is known as the 1st Albanian feature film, produced by Shqipëria Film Studios (later known as Kinostudio "Shqipëria e Re") and premiered on 17 August 17 1958. For many years he was the Artistic Director at the Film Studio. Kristaq Dhamo was a living encyclopedia of movies, he was the teacher of many directors and screenwriters of Albanian feature and documentary films. He has provided invaluable assistance in the preparation of young cinematography students, by organizing several professional courses, while generously sharing his knowledge and long experience in the field of film with his younger colleagues. On his initiative, in September 1984, at the Higher Institute of Arts (today University of Arts), the first one-year course for screenwriters and directors of feature and documentary films was opened. https://gazetadita.al/per-artistin-dhe-njeriun-kristaq-dhamo/

His 1958 film Tana was entered into the 1st Moscow International Film Festival. The subject of Tana movie, with a theme from the social life of the village was written by Fatmir Gjata and is based on his novel with the same title. The events take place in the 1950s. At the center of the film is Tana - a smart girl with progressive thoughts. She loves Stefan, who lives in a poor mountain village. Tana comes across the old mentality of her grandfather as well as Lefter's jealousy. It is a love game towards progress. In this movie there is the first "kiss scene" in Albanian films.

Dhamo died on 14 August 2022, at the age of 89, survived by his two daughters and his wife, archaeologist Dhorka Dhamo.

== Filmography ==
=== Director ===
Kristaq Dhamo directed many other movies during the communism regime, among which:

- Botë e padukshme (1987)
- Vendimi (1984)
- Qortimet e vjeshtës (1982)
- Nga mesi i errësirës (1978)
- Brazdat (1973)
- Mëngjeze lufte (1971)
- Gjurma (1970)
- Miqësi revolucionare (1967)
- Ata nuk vdesin (1966)
- Vitet e para (1965)
- Detyrë e posaçme (1963)
- Ansambli i këngëve dhe valleve (1960)
- Fortuna (1959)
- Ne u dashuruam me Shqipërinë (1959)
- Tana (1958)

=== Movie Screenplays/Scripts ===
He acted also as screenwriter for some of his directed movies:

- Botë e padukshme (1987)
- Qortimet e vjeshtës (1982)
- Nga mesi i errësirës (1978)_
- Vitet e para (1965)
- Ansambli i këngëve dhe valleve (1960)
- Tana (1958) - – first Albanian featured long movie
