= Robert Ndrenika =

Albanian actor (born 1942)

- Born: 10 January 1942 (age 84); Tirana, Albania
- Education: Qemal Stafa High School; Aleksandër Moisiu University of Durrës
- Occupation: Actor
- Years active: 1966–present
- Spouse: Polikseni Ndrenika (died 2008)
- Children: 2
- Awards: People's Artist Honor of the Nation

Robert Ndrenika (born 10 January 1942) is an Albanian actor, honored with the People's Artist of Albania award in 1988. He was active in films, but also in theater and television performing hundreds of leading and supporting roles.

== Biography ==
Ndrenika studied at the Qemal Stafa High School, in Tirana, Albania.

He was a member of Parliament of Albania from 1992–1996, representing the Democratic Party of Albania.

In 1998, Ndrenika was honoured with People's Artist of Albania decoration, becoming one of the few actors to have this decoration. In 2012, he was decorated with Honor of Nation Order by president Bamir Topi for his contributions in Albanian cinematography.

Ndrenika has two daughters. His wife Polikseni Ndrenika, died in 2008. The loss of his wife kept him away from acting for the next four years. He returned on stage in April 2012.

== Filmography ==
- Kronikë provinciale (2009)
- Ne dhe Lenini – (2008)
- Tifozet – (2004) komedi
- Ishte koha për dashuri – (2004)
- Njerez dhe fate – (2002–2003) miniseries
- Tirana, Year Zero – (2001) Kujtimi
- Slogans (Parullat) – (2001) Lleshi
- Bolero – (1997)
- Nata e dymbëdhjetë – teatër-komedi
- Botë e padukshme – (1987) Iliazi
- A Tale from the Past (Përrallë Nga e Kaluara) – (1987) Vangjeli
- Vrasje në gjueti – (1987)
- Dhe vjen një ditë – (1986) Vëllai i Llano Bletës
- Gurët e shtëpisë sime – (1985)
- Tre njerëz me guna – (1985)
- Shirat e vjeshtës – (1984)
- Kohë e largët – (1983) Anastas Grigori
- Besa e kuqe – (1982)
- Era e ngrohtë e thellësive – (1982) (TV)
- Nëntori i dytë – (1982)
- Shi në plazh – (1982)
- Vëllezër dhe shokë – (1982)
- Një shoqe nga fshati – (1980)
- Ditët që sollën pranverën – (1979) (TV)
- Mësonjëtorja – (1979) Kosta
- Në shtëpinë tonë – (1979)
- Koncert në vitin 1936 (1978) Fotaqi (n/prefekti)
- Shëmbja e idhujve – (1977) Kapteri
- Emblema e dikurëshme – (1976) (TV)
- Duke kërkuar 5-orëshin – (1974) Zeqo
- Rrugë të bardha – (1974)
- Shtigje të luftës – (1974) Shabani
- Kryengritje në pallat – (1972)
- Odiseja e tifozave – (1972)
- Kapedani – (1972) i biri i xha Sulos
- I teti në bronx – (1970) Xhemali
- Horizonte të hapura – (1968) Azemi
- Oshëtimë në bregdet – (1966)
