= Besnik Bisha =

Albanian film director

- Born: 1958 (age 67–68); Tirana, Albania
- Occupations: Film director, actor
- Years active: 1981–present

Besnik Bisha (born 1958) is an Albanian film director and actor. He has directed five films since 1988. His 2007 film Mao Tse Tung was entered into the 30th Moscow International Film Festival.

== Selected filmography ==
- Bolero (1997)
- Mao Tse Tung (2007)
