= Andon Zako Çajupi =

Albanian lawyer, playwright and writer who joined the Albanian nationalist movement

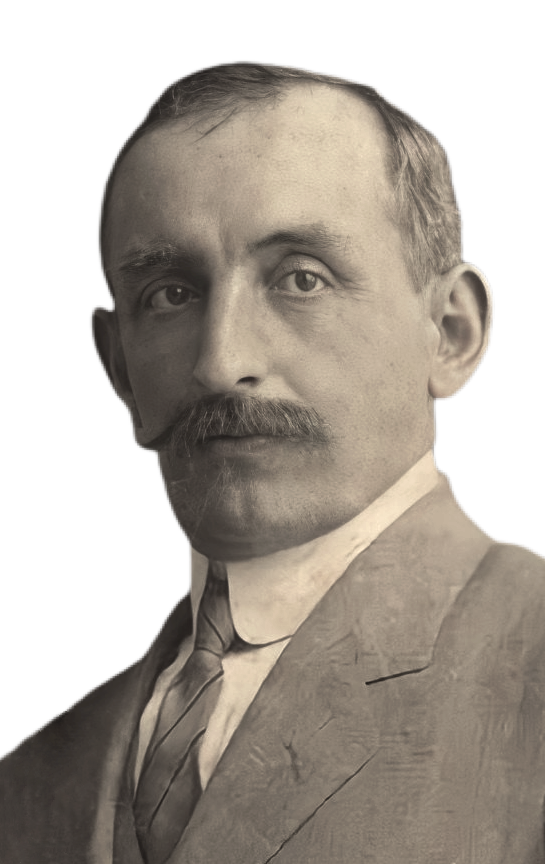
- Portrait of Andon Zako Çajupi, 1910s
- Born: 27 March 1866; Sheper, Upper Zagoria, Ottoman Albania
- Died: 11 July 1930 (aged 64); Heliopolis, Egypt
- Occupations: lawyer; playwright; poet; writer
- Relatives: Harito Zako (father)
- Writing career
- Pen name: Çajupi
- Language: Albanian

Andon Zako Çajupi (27 March 1866 – 11 July 1930) was an Albanian lawyer, playwright, poet and rilindas.

== Biography ==
He was born in the village of Sheper, Upper Zagoria, Albania, then Ottoman Empire, on 27 March 1866. Çajupi's father, Harito Zako, was a tobacco merchant, with a business extending throughout the then-Ottoman Empire and also into Italy and other parts of western Europe.

Çajupi's elementary education was undertaken at the nearest Greek elementary school. In 1882, he moved to Alexandria, where he studied French for five years at Sainte Catherine des Lazaristes. During his time in Alexandria, Çajupi met several western European lawyers representing businesses in Egypt. These meetings convinced him to study law in Switzerland, and in 1887, Çajupi arrived in Geneva, where he studied law for five years. While studying law in Switzerland, he met his future wife, Eugenia. The couple had a son, Stefan.

After graduating, Çajupi practiced law in Geneva for three years. Eugenia died in 1892, and this tragedy forced Çajupi to leave Switzerland and return to Albania. After his return in 1894, Çajupi found employment representing a German company in Cairo.

Çajupi came to spend most of life residing in Egypt. During his Egyptian career, Çajupi defended a French company against the interests of the Egyptian government and the German law firm employing him, a move which caused him to terminate his employment with the firm but ultimately proved fruitless as he lost the case. Due to his family's wealth, however, this did not cause him serious difficulties, and he withdrew to his villa at Heliopolis near Cairo.

During this time, Çajupi met many Albanian businesspeople and joined the Albanian nationalist movement in Egypt where he played an active role in agitating for Albanian independence from the Ottoman Empire. Records from 1902 show that he was an active member of the Albanian Fraternity of Egypt, Vëllazëria e Egjiptit. Çajupi's financial support and professional expertise were both required in his role promoting Albanian independence. Following the declaration of Albanian independence, Çajupi organized a party in his home.

== Literary work ==
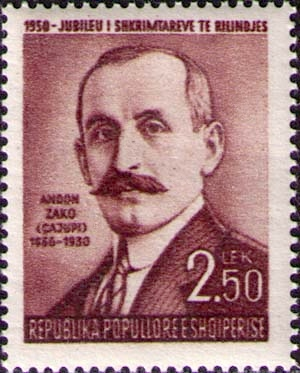
Zako on a 1950 stamp of Albania

While participating in the Albanian nationalist movement (especially between 1898 and 1912), Çajupi expressed his patriotic beliefs in the form of poetry and prose, with his poetry taking its cue from Tosk Albanian. The nationalist and patriotic messages of his poems made them extremely popular among Albanian adults and children, and led to Çajupi being revered as the most important Albanian poet after Naim Frashëri, a position he still holds in the modern state. Çajupi in 1898 also got involved in the Albanian alphabet question and wrote a series of articles in the periodical Albania where he advocated for adoption of a Latin script and objected to a Greek or Ottoman Turkish script for writing Albanian.

In 1902, Çajupi published in Cairo an anthology, Baba-Tomorri ("Father Tomorr"), named after the Albanian mythological character. The volume contains nationalist themes, and it is divided into three sections: "Fatherland", "Love", and "True and False Tales". Çajupi also wrote plays and novels, with his work on Skanderbeg entitled Burr' i dheut ("The earthly hero") being published in 1907.

Additionally, Çajupi wrote a comedy titled Pas vdekjes ("After the death") in 1910. Çajupi's most popular comedy is the posthumously-published Katërmbëdhjetë vjeç dhëndër ("A bridegroom at fourteen"). The four-act comedy is an attack on the traditional custom of arranged marriages.

Çajupi's dramas and comedies are well known in Albania and are frequently performed. The poet died at his home in Heliopolis, Egypt, on 11 July 1930. His remains were transferred to Albania in 1958.

== Legacy ==
A school in Kosovo and a high school in Tirana have been named after Çajupi. Also Korçë city's theater bears his name.

== In Literature ==
Agim Shehu, a well known Albanian writer, has recreated in a short story the memory of Çajupi's love for the Swiss young girl Eugenie, who later would become his wife.

== See also ==
- List of Albanian writers
- Albanians in Egypt
