= Roza Anagnosti =

Albanian actress (born 1943)

- Born: Roza Xhuxha; 27 October 1943 (age 82); Shkodër, Albania
- Occupation: Actress
- Spouse: Dhimitër Anagnosti (m. 1965; died 2025)
- Awards: Honor of the Nation

Roza Anagnosti (born: Roza Xhuxha; 27 October 1943) is an Albanian actress. She was the wife of famous director Dhimitër Anagnosti, known for her great roles in Fijet që priten (1976), Mësonjëtorja (1980), Detyrë e posaçme (1963), Botë e Paduskshme (1987) and Vetmi (1990).

== Life and career ==
Anagnosti started her career at the Migjeni Theater in Shkodra. At 20, she became a movie actress with the role of a teacher in the film Special Duty (K. Dhamo, 1963). A year later she played the role of File in Our Land (H. Hakani, 1964). In 1966 she worked in the film debut of filmmakers Dhimiter Anagnosti and Viktor Gjika, in The Commissar of Light. After this film, Roza and Dhimitri married and lived in Tirana. This was the beginning of an important period in her career, with numerous roles at the National Theater in Tirana and in film. Anagnosti played in over 20 films including Old Wounds (Anagnosti, 1969), The Waiting Thread (M. Fejzo, 1976) for which she won the 1977 Medal of the Festival, Mesonjetorja (M. Fejzo, 1979), where she won best actress and the 1981 Festival Cup. With the film The Way of Freedom she won the Second Medal. Other films include The Deal 1972, The Youngest City in the World 1974, In Our Home 1979, First Appointment Day 1981, Red Besa 1982, Taulanti Wants a Sister 1984, 1985, The Invisible World 1987, My Family 1987, Murder on Hunting 1987, Reconstruction 1988, The Return of the Dead Army 1989, The Only 1990. Anagnosti holds the title Deserved Artist and Great Worker Masters.

== Filmography ==
- Gjoleka, djali i Abazit (2006)
- Valsi i Titanikut (1990) theatre-comedy
- Vetmi (English: Solitude) (1990), Bardha
- Kthimi i Ushtrisë së Vdekur (English: Return of the Dead Army) (1989)
- Rikonstruksioni (English: Reconstruction) (1988) (TV)
- Botë e padukshme (English: Invisible World) (1987).....doktoreshë Besmira
- Familja ime (1987)
- Vrasje ne gjueti (1987)
- Gurët e shtëpisë sime (English: The stones of my house) (1985)
- Taulanti kërkon një motër (English: Taulant wants a little sister) (1984), Luli
- Besa e kuqe (English: The Road to Freedom) (1982) - Mrika
- Rruga e lirisë (1982)
- Dita e parë e emrimit (English: The First Day of the Assignment) (1981)
- Mësonjtorja (English: The Teacher) (1979)..........Dafina
- Në shtëpinë tonë (1979)
- Fije që priten (English: Broken Threads) (1976)
- Qyteti më i ri në botë (English: The newest city in the world) (1974)
- Ndërgjegja (English: Conscience) (1972)...........Arta
- Plagë të vjetra (English: The Ancient Wounds) (1968)......Vera
- Komisari i dritës (English: The Commissioner of Light) (1966)....Rudina
- Toka jonë (1964) .... Filja
- Detyrë e posaçme (English: The Special Mission) (1963)
