= Dhimitër Xhuvani =

Albanian writer, screenwriter (1934–2009)

- Born: 23 May 1934; Pogradec, Albania
- Died: 19 September 2009 (aged 75); Tirana, Albania
- Education: University of Tirana
- Occupations: Writer, screenwriter
- Writing career
- Language: Albanian
- Notable work: Përsëri në këmbë

Dhimitër Xhuvani (23 May 1934 – 19 September 2009) was an Albanian writer and screenwriter.

Xhuvani was born in 1934 in Pogradec. His father, Kostaq Xhuvani, was a respected teacher from Elbasan. In 1944, during World War II, his family fled from Pogradec and took refuge in Mokër, where they stayed until their country was liberated, after which they moved to Elbasan. After finishing medical high-school he worked in the rural hospitals of Librazhd, Peqin, Gramsh, and Cërrik. After leaving medicine he continued his studies in the Faculty of History and Philology in Tirana and later in Moscow.

Dhimitër is the winner of many literary awards, and his work has been translated in many languages including Italian, French, English, Russian, Japanese and Chinese.

He died in Tirana of natural causes at the age of 75.

== Works ==
- Kambanat e fundit (1958)
- Midis dy netëve (1962)
- Tuneli (1966)
- Përsëri në këmbë (1970)
- Fan Smajli (1971)
- Zgjimi i Nebi Surrelit (1976)
- Do të jetojmë ndryshe (1979)
- Vdekja e zotit Kaloti (1981)
- Bota ime (1984)
