= Dhimitër Anagnosti =

Albanian film director and politician (1936–2025)

- Born: 23 January 1936; Vuno, Albania
- Died: c. 1 September 2025 (aged 89); Tirana, Albania
- Occupation: Film director
- Years active: 1961–2025
- Spouse: Roza Anagnosti (m. 1965)
- Children: 2
- Awards: People's Artist Merited Artist Honor of the Nation

Dhimitër Anagnosti (23 January 1936 – c. 1 September 2025) was an Albanian film director, screenwriter, cinematographer, and politician. He was a member of the Parliament of Albania in the 1990s and a Minister of Culture, Youth and Sports. For his contribution in film, he received the People's Artist of Albania medal. In 2011, former president Bamir Topi accredited him the "Honor of the Nation" order, Albanian: Urdhri "Nderi i Kombit".

== Early life ==
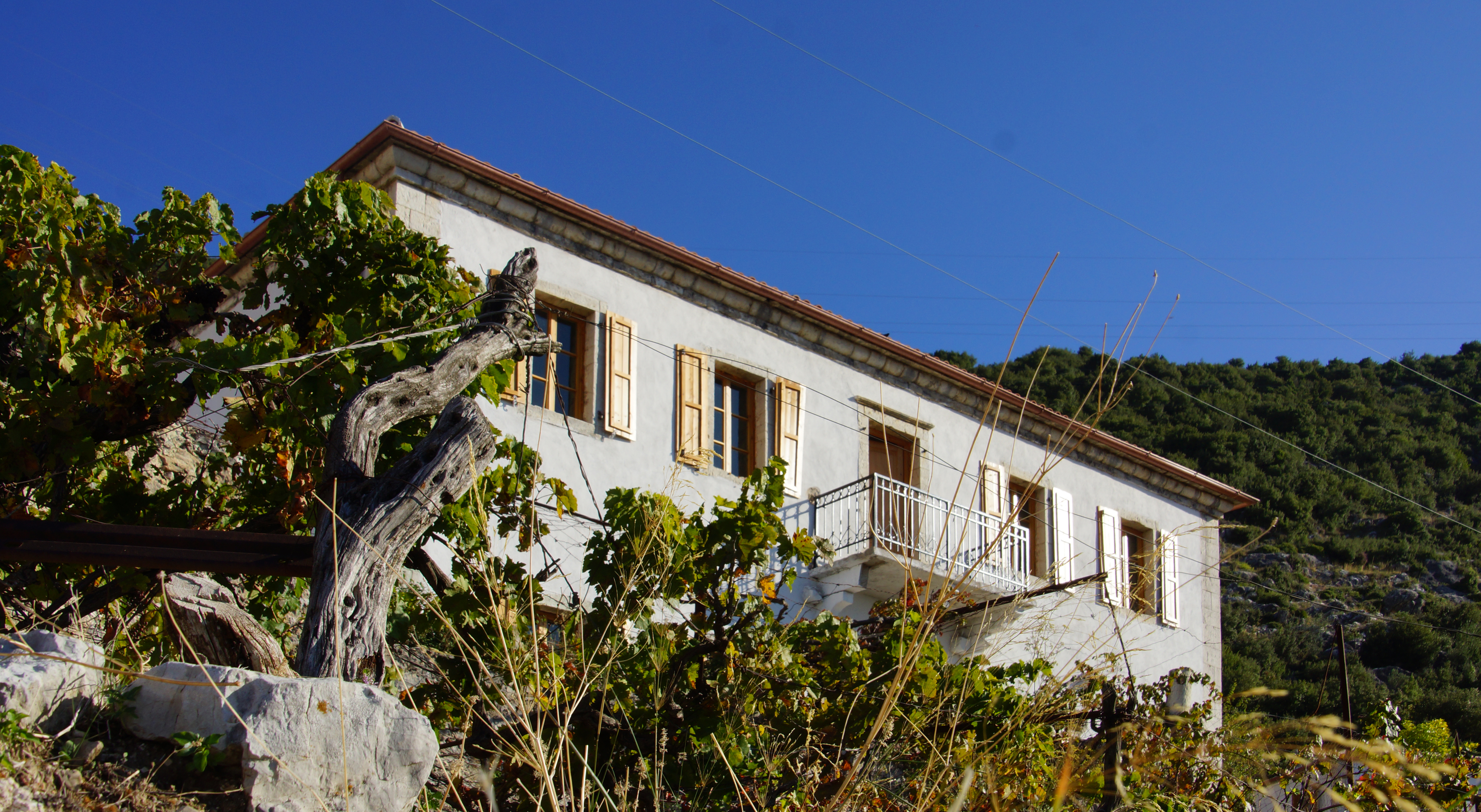
Anagnosti's house

Anagnosti was born on 23 January 1936, in Vuno. After graduating the Ali Demi high school in Vlorë, he pursued his studies and graduated as a film director in Gerasimov Institute of Cinematography of Moscow.

In 1961, along with Viktor Gjika, Anagnosti directed the film, Njeriu kurrë nuk vdes (English: The Man Never Dies), using as a script a short story from American writer, Ernest Hemingway. The work earned him First Prize in the World's Festival of Cinematographic Schools, in the Netherlands.

== Career ==
Anagnosti started to work as a cineast within Kinostudio Shqipëria e Re in 1961, with the film, Debatik in 1961 and subsequently with the film Toka jonë (English: Our Land) in 1964. He was also the writer of the first Albanian color documentary, Gurët dekorativë (English: Decorative stones). In 1966, Anagnosti co-directed, with Viktor Gjika, Komisari i dritës (English: The Commissary of the Light), and a year later he directed Duel i heshtur (English: Silent Duel).

Overall he has directed 14 films and 10 documentaries, and has won many national and international prizes. He was also the screenwriter of most of the films he directed.

For his extraordinary performance of some of the best Albanian films, he has been given the title Merited Artist of Albania, and in 1987, People's Artist of Albania. During the communist rule of Albania, however, many of his works were censored. He won the Cup to the Carrier in the Ninth Festival of the Albanian Film.

== Political career ==
Between 1991 and 1996, Anagnosti was involved in politics. He was elected Member of the Albanian Parliament as a deputy of the Democratic Party of Albania. On April 12, 1992, he took over the post of Minister of Culture, Youth and Sports. He resigned on December 4, 1994. The reasons for his resignation were that Sali Berisha, then President of Albania, had not recognized the negative result of a popular referendum for a new constitution as his own political failure, and had not resigned himself.

== Return to art ==
After leaving politics, Anagnosti created the Foundation for Art and Culture, endorsing the most active artists and contributing to the enhancement of Albanian culture and its international exposure. Among other things, this foundation has enabled the publication of 160 books.

In 2001, Anagnosti returned to his directing skills after many years of absence. For the National Theater of Albania, he directed the stage drama, "Nata e trokitjeve në xham" (English: Night of the Knocks on the Window). In 2005 he also directed a film, Gjoleka, djali i Abazit (English: Father and Godfather): The film won two international prizes in Italy.

== Personal life and death ==
Anagnosti was married to the Albanian actress Roza Anagnosti (Xhuxha), a Merited Artist of Albania.

On 1 September 2025, it was announced that Dhimitër Anagnosti had died at the age of 89.

== Film direction ==
The following is a list of films directed by Anagnosti.

- Gjoleka i biri i Abazit (2006) (English: Father and Godfather)
- Kthimi i ushtrisë së vdekur (1989) (English: The Return of the Dead Army)
- Përralle Nga e Kaluara (1987) (English: A Tale from the Past)
- Gurët e shtëpisë sime (1985) (English: Stones of my House)
- Kujtime nga Gjirokastra (1983) (English: Memories from Gjirokaster)
- Vëllezër dhe shokë (1982) (English: Brothers and Comrades)
- Në shtepinë tonë (1979) (English: In our Home)
- Monumenti (film)|Monumenti (1977) (English: The Monument)
- Lulëkuqet mbi mure (1976) (English: Poppies on Walls)
- Kur hiqen maskat (1975) (English: When Masks are Taken Off)
- Cuca e maleve (1974) (English: The Girl of the Mountains)
- Përjetësi (1974) (English: Eternity)
- Motive nga dita e diel (1973) (English: Motives from a Sunday)
- Malet me blerim mbuluar (1971) (English: Mountains of Green Filled)
- Parafabrikatet (1970) (English: Parafabrics)
- Plagë të vjetra (1968) (English: Old Wounds)
- Duel i heshtur (1967) (English: Silent Duel)
- Komisari i dritës (1966) (English: Commissary of the Light)
- Njeriu kurrë nuk vdes (1961) (English: The Man Never Dies)
