= Aleksandër Moisiu Theatre =

Theatre in Durrës, Albania

- Teatri i Durrësit
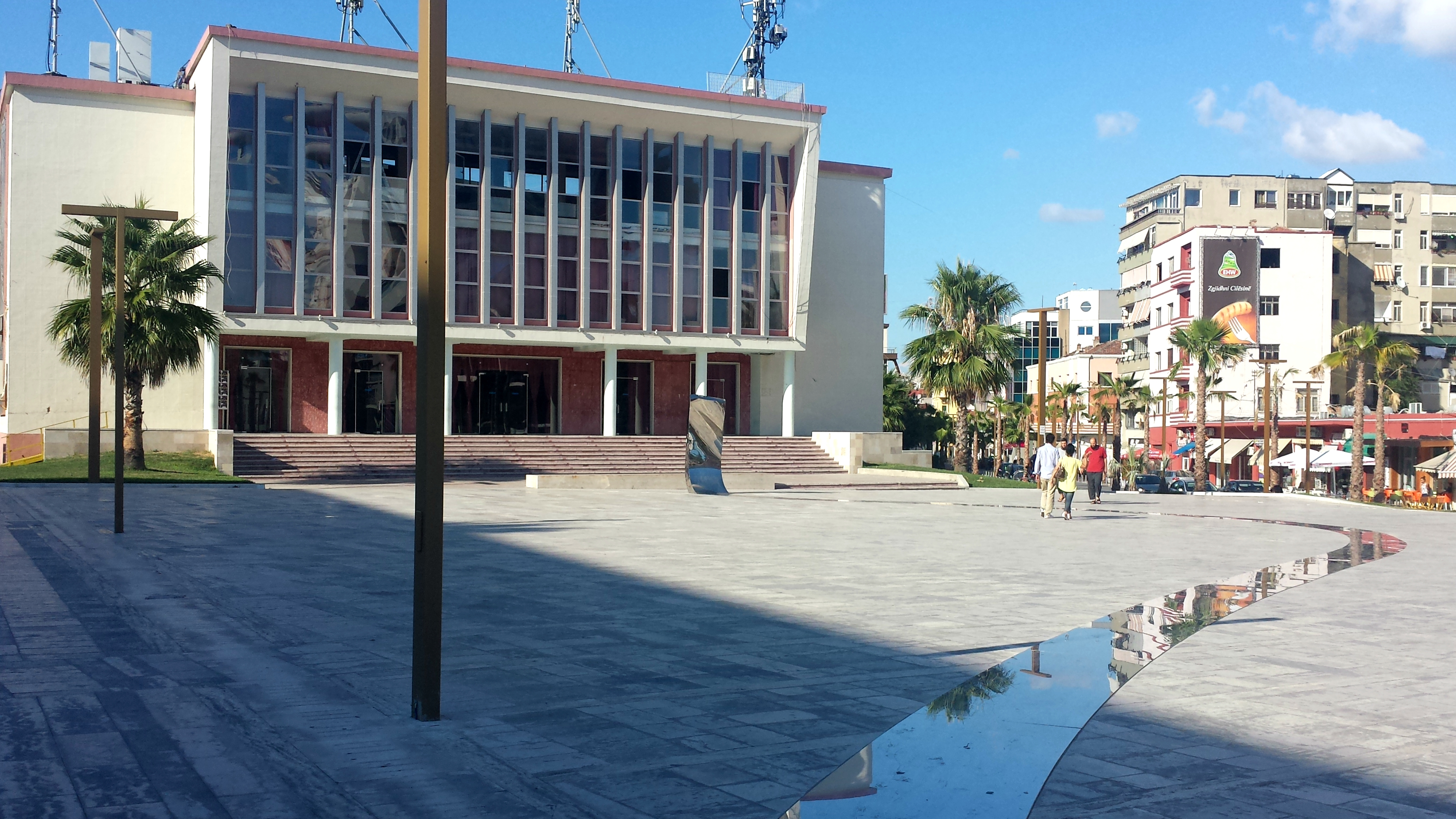
- Aleksandër Moisiu Theatre
- Interactive map of Aleksandër Moisiu Theatre
- Address: Lagja Nr: 2, Square Liria; Durrës; Albania
- Coordinates: 41.3143°N 19.4465°E
- Owner: State owned

Construction
- Opened: 11 January 1953

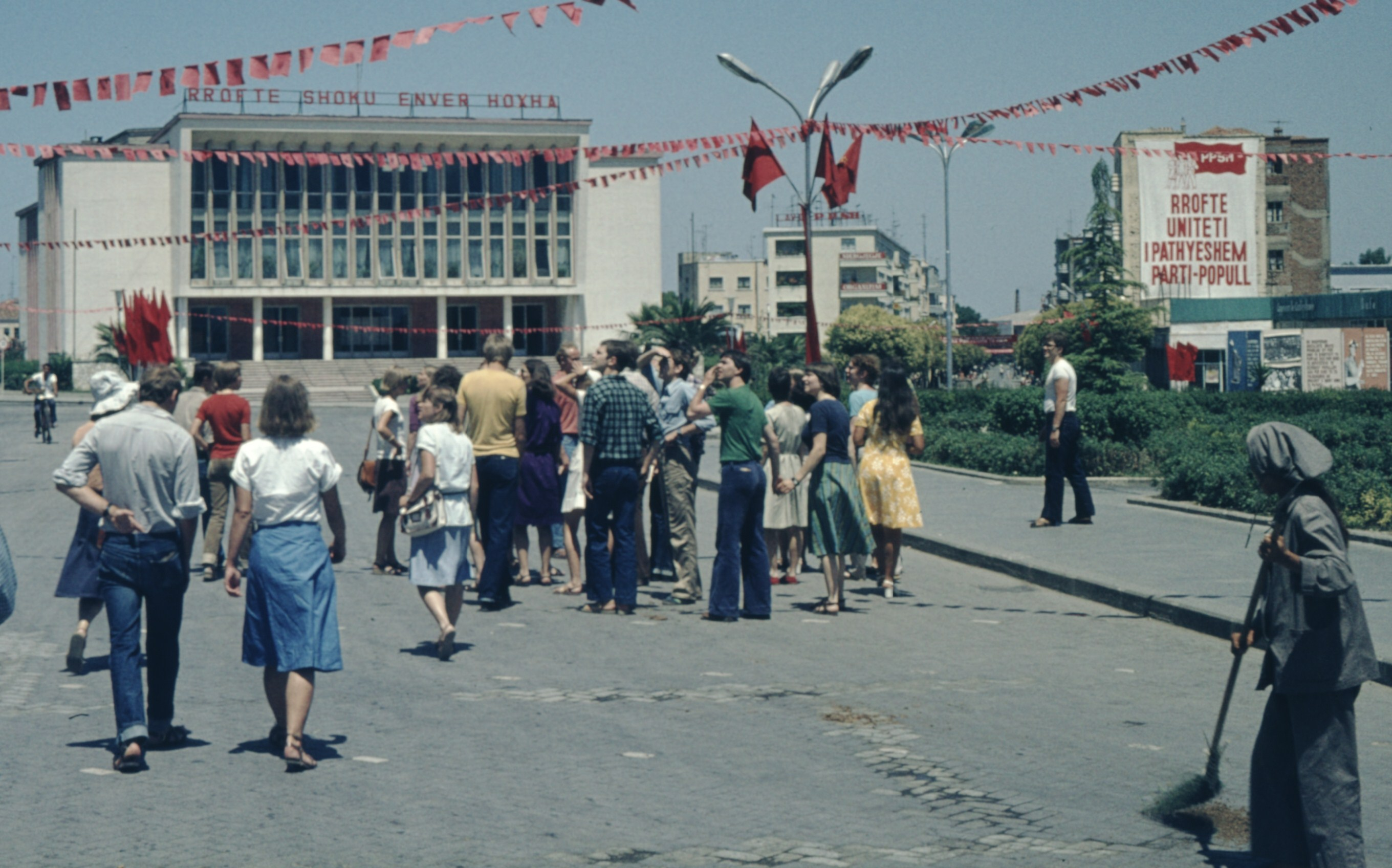
Theatre in 1978

The Aleksandër Moisiu Theatre, or called also Durrës Theatre (Albanian: Teatri Aleksandër Moisiu) is a theatre in the city centre of Durrës, Albania. The theatre took its name from Austrian actor Alexander Moissi, who was of Albanian descent.

== History ==
The building of the theatre dates from the 1950s. It officially opened on 11 January 1953. His first show was the comedy "The Girl from the village" (Albanian: Vajza nga fshati) the writer Fatmir Gjata, staged by director Pandi Stillu.

=== Drejtoret ne vite / Theater Directors ===
- Shaban Hidri,
- Llazar Ziu,
- Gaqo Spiru,
- Remzi Tivari,
- Ibrahim Nova,
- Bardhyl Agasi,
- Mirush Kabashi,
- Xhelal Tafaj,
- Bashkim Hoxha,
- Skender Myshketa,
- Enver Plaku,
- Sofokli Afezolli,
- Bujar Qesja,
- Genti Salillari (i komanduar),
- Mimoza Marjanaku,
- Ermion Arapi,
- Melsi Labi,
- Bashkim Hoxha,
- Elio Bajramaj,

== See also ==
- List of theatres in Albania
