= Vath Koreshi =

Albanian screenwriter (1936–2006)

Vath Koreshi (1936–2006) was one of the most renowned Albanian novelists and screen writers. He is perhaps best known for writing a series of romans and novels such as “The two Saturdays of Susana" (1971), “The Hajji of Frakulla" and “The marriage of Sako" (1980),“Requiem for a woman" (1995), "The wulf and the star" (1996), “A woman in yellow in Buddha Forest" (2003) etc., but also for writing scripts to the movies "Gjeneral Gramafoni" (1978); "Rrugë të Bardha" (1974). "Balada e Kurbinit" (1990) etc.

Biography of Vath Koreshi:

Education: 1960-1964 Albanian Language and Literature, University of Tirana

Work: 2001-2005 Member of the Albanian Parliament 1995-2000 Director, Publishing House “ONUFRI”; 1992-1995 Chief editor of Cultural Magazine “Art”; 1991-1992 Minister of Culture, Youth and Sports; 1987-1991 Director of Arts Department, Ministry of Culture; 1983-1987 Freelance writer; 1978-1983 Head of “Albafilm Studio”; 1973-1978 Journalist at the weekly art newspaper “Drita” (Light); 1964-1973 Journalist at “Zëri i Rinisë” (The Voice of Youth) newspaper;

Publications: 1964 “Kur zunë shirat e vjeshtës” (When the fall rains began), Collection of short stories; 1968 “Toka nën hijen e shtëpive” (The land under the shadows of houses), Collection of short stories; 1971 “Dy të shtunat e Suzanës (The two Saturdays of Susana), Roman; 1971 “Ndërrimi i qiejve” (The change of skies), Collection of short stories; 1975 “Mars” (March), Roman; 1977 “Mali mbi kënetë” (The mountain over the marsh), Roman; 1980 “Haxhiu i Frakullës” (The Hajji of Frakulla), Roman; 1980 “Dasma e Sakos” (The marriage of Sako), Roman; 1985 “Rrugë për larg” (Road to far away), Roman; 1985 “Leopardi” (Lepard), Novel; 1987 “Balada e Kurbinit” (The Ballad of Kurbin), Roman; 1995 “Requiem për një grua” (Requiem for a woman), Roman; 1996 Ulku dhe Uilli (The wulf and the star), Roman; 1999 “Konomea” (Konomea), Novel; 2003 “Një grua me te verdha ne pyllin e Buddha-s” (A woman in yellow in Buddha Forest), Roman; 2005 “Çafka” (The heron), Roman;

Scripts for artistic movies and documentaries: 1974 “Rrugë të bardha” (White roads); 1976 “Nga mesi i errësirës” (Into the dark); 1978 “Gjeneral Gramafoni” (General of Gramophone); 1978 “Agimet e stinës së madhe” (The dawn of a great season); 1979 “Liri a vdekje” (Freedom or death); 1980 “Nata e parë e lirisë” (The first night of freedom); 1982 “Në kufi të dy legjendave” (Two legends); 1982 “Plaku dhe hasmi” (The old man and the enemy); 1984 “Besa e kuqe” (The red pledge); 1986 “Në prag të jetës” (On the threshold of life); 1987 “Botë e padukshme” (Invisible world); 1990 “Balada e Kurbinit” (The Ballad of Kurbin); 1998 “Dasma e Sakos” (The marriage of Sako); 2000 “Porta Eva” (Gate Eva); 2000 “Lotët e Kosovës” (The Tears of Kosova); 2000 “Në kërkim të Hafize Leskovikut” (About Hafize Leskoviku); 2000 “Të bekuarit” (Blessed); 2002 “Bir” (Son); 2002 “O Çoban” (Remzi Lela –sobriquet Çobani (the Shepherd);

DRAMA: 1967 “Hijet ikin nga mallet” (Shadows move away from mountains); 1968 “Njerëzit e minierës” (Mine people); 1970 “Mysafiri i natës” (The night guest);

AWARDS: 2020 “Honorary Citizen (posthumous) of the city of Gjirokastra; 2008 Republic of Albania “Honor of the Nation” (posthumous); 2000 “Honorary Citizen of the city of Lushnja (birthplace);

Republic award for: 1979 Gjeneral Gramafoni (The General of Gramophone) –movie script; 1981 Dasma e Sakos (The marriage of Sako) – Roman;

Order “Naim Frashëri”: 1985 Order of the First Rank; 1976 Order of the Second Rank; 1969 Order of the Third Rank;

International awards: 1990 “Gjeneral Gramafoni” (General of Gramophone), diploma, International Festival of Istanbul; 1990 “Balada e Kurbinit” (The Ballad of Kurbin-movie), Diploma International Festival of Paris for artistic and historic movies; this was also the first Albanian movie to represent Albania in the Venice Festival in 1989. 1996 Literature Award “Çikal Brindizi”;

CUPS OF ALBANIAN NATIONAL FESTIVALS:

1979 “Gjeneral Gramafoni” (General of Gramophone); 1987 “Balada e Kurbinit” (The Ballad of Kurbin); 2000 "Dasma e Sakos" (The Marriage of Sako) (the Best Movie script).
