= National Center of Cinematography (Albania) =

Film production company

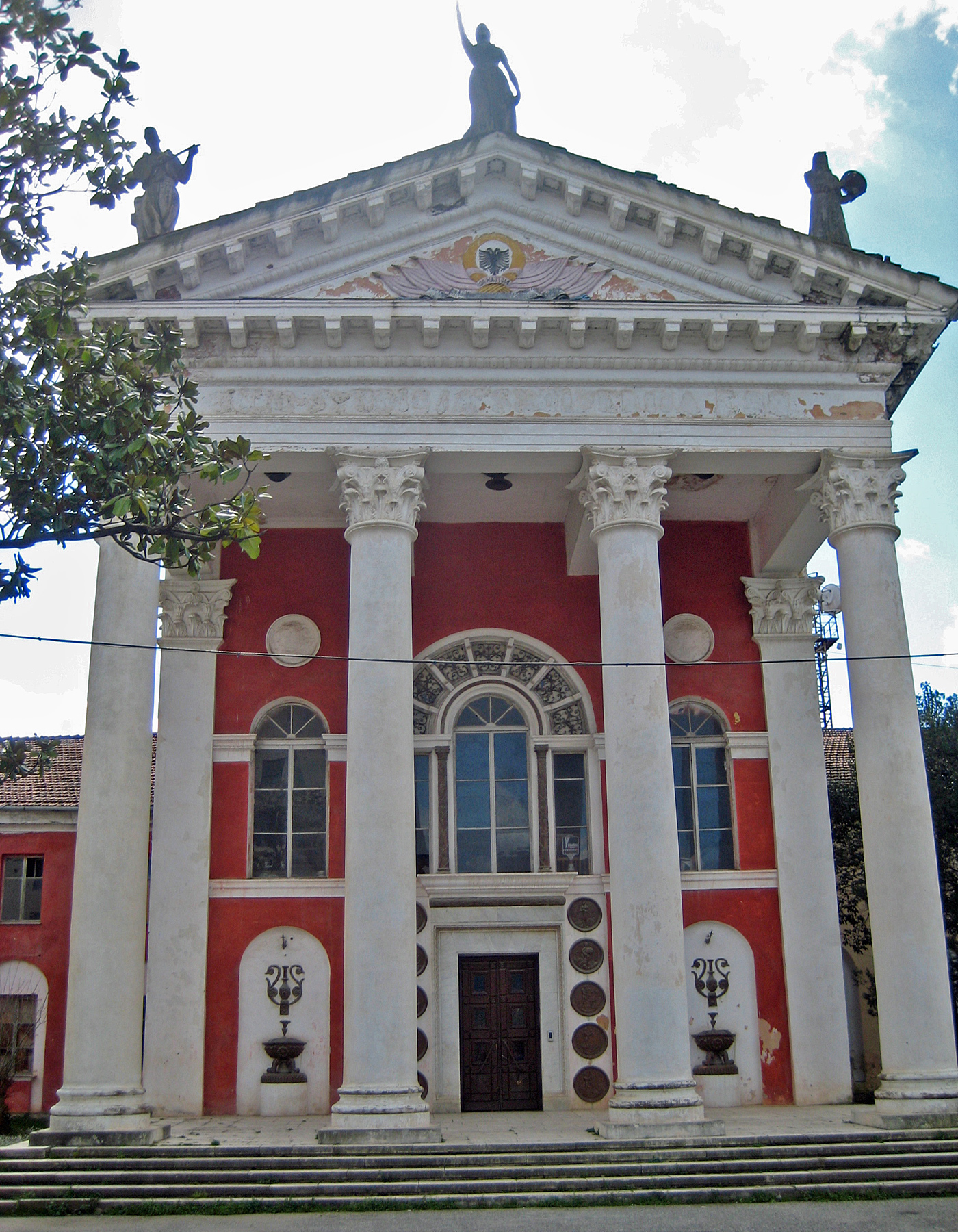
- Formerly: Kinostudio Shqipëria e Re
- Industry: Filmmaking; Film distribution
- Founded: 1952
- Headquarters: Tirana, Albania
- Key people: Eduart Makri
- Website: Official Website

The National Center of Cinematography (Albanian: Qendra Kombëtare e Kinematografisë) is the largest film distributor and film production company in the cinema of Albania connected with over 700 films (feature films and documentaries) between 1947 and 2012. The studio has produced and distributed the vast majority of Albanian films. Especially important was its work in the 1970s and 1980s when the studio averaged 75–80 movies per year.

== History ==
The Centre of Cinematography was established in 1945 as the Agency of Albanian Films (Agjencia Shqiptare e Filmave) and in 1947 it was transformed into the Albanian Cinematographical National Company (Ndërmarrje Shtetërore Kinematografike Shqiptare). At that time all the movie theatres were nationalised, so the company was in charge of both movie production and management of theatres. In May 1948 the company presented its first cinematographic chronicle. It also contributed in the 1940s and 1950s with the building of many movie theatres throughout Albania. In 1952, the movie studio Kinostudio Shqipëria e Re was created, which lasted until 1992, and was replaced by the Albafilm-Tirana (1992–1996).

In 1996 the current National Center of Cinematography was created by a government decree.

== Filmography ==
=== 1940s ===
- 1 Maj 1949 (1949) ... Distributor

=== 1950s ===
- Dritë mbi Shqipëri (1958) ... Distributor
- Takim vëllazëror (1958) ... Distributor

=== 1960s ===
- 25 vjetori i Kongresit të parë të BGSH (1969) ... Distributor
- Ai është bir i klasës punëtore (1969) ... Distributor
- Biri i Mirditës (1969) ... Distributor
- Drini u thye (1969) ... Distributor
- Këngë e valle nga gurra popullore (1969) ... Distributor
- Në kampin e pionerëve-Vlorë (1969) ... Distributor
- Nepër rrugët e dritës (1969) ... Distributor
- Nga festivali artistik i fëmijve (1969) ... Distributor
- Njësiti guerril (1969) ... Distributor
- Përmes terrenit të infektuar (1969) ... Distributor
- Për një zhvillim më të shpejtë të shpendëve (1969) ... Distributor
- Për rendimente të larta në misër (1969) ... Distributor
- Perse bie kjo daulle (1969) ... Distributor
- Reportazh nga Mirdita (1969) ... Distributor
- Rruga jote, shok (1969) ... Distributor
- Shkolla dhe praktika (1969) ... Distributor
- Toka të përtërira (1969) ... Distributor
- Vojo Kushi (1969) ... Distributor
- 90 vjetori i Lidhjes së Prizrenit (1968) ... Distributor
- Dita e pionerit (1968) ... Distributor
- Horizonte te hapura (1968) ... Distributor
- Kalitemi nepërmjet aksioneve (1968) ... Distributor
- Këngët e të vegjëlve (1968) ... Distributor
- Lart flamujt e aksioneve (1968) ... Distributor
- Mbresa vullnetarësh (1968) ... Distributor
- Ne mbrojmë Atdheun Socialist (1968) ... Distributor
- Në ndihmë të koperativave malore (1968) ... Distributor
- Për zhvillimin intensiv të lopës (1968) ... Distributor
- Pusteci (1968) ... Distributor
- Trim mbi trima (1968) ... Distributor
- Vatra e flakës së madhe (1968) ... Distributor
- Vrulli i mendimit krijues të masave (1968) ... Distributor
- Ato çajnë përpara (1967) ... Distributor
- Biri i Partisë (1967) ... Distributor
- Gra heroike shqiptare përpara (1967) ... Distributor
- Inciativa krijuse e masave (1967) ... Distributor
- Lart flamujt e kuq (1967) ... Distributor
- Letër nga mjeku i Kuçit (1967) ... Distributor
- Më tepër ujë për tokën (1967) ... Distributor
- Miqësi revolucionare (1967) ... Distributor
- Në gjurmët partizane (1967) ... Distributor
- Rritje (1967) ... Distributor
- Të fala nga fshati (1967) ... Distributor
- Ata nuk vdesin (1966) ... Distributor
- Çajupi (1966) ... Distributor
- Fitimtarët (1966) ... Distributor
- Kënga të buçasë (1966) ... Distributor
- Kjo është toka jonë (1966) ... Distributor
- Maleve me dëborë (1966) ... Distributor
- Me forcat tona (1966) ... Distributor
- Miqësi e madhe unitet luftarak (1966) ... Distributor
- Ndre Mjeda (1966) ... Distributor
- Në sharat e Sopotit (1966) ... Distributor
- Plehrat organike (1966) ... Distributor
- Poema e të njëzetmijve (1966) ... Distributor
- Shkolla e fshatit malor (1966) ... Distributor
- Taracat në bjeshkë (1966) ... Distributor
- Të parët në rrugën e kolektivizimit (1966) ... Distributor
- Cirk (1965) ... Distributor
- Në praktikë me studentët natyralistë (1965) ... Distributor
- Në rjedhën e jetës (1965) ... Distributor
- Njerzit dhe veprat (1965) ... Distributor
- Përse mendojnë këto male (1965) ... Distributor
- Policia popullore në shërbim (1965) ... Distributor
- Posta kufitare (1965) ... Distributor
- Takim me Arbreshët (1965) ... Distributor
- Vangjush Mio (1965) ... Distributor
- Vitet e para (1965) ... Distributor
- Zbuluesit në stërvitje (1965) ... Distributor
- Anës së Drinit (1964) ... Distributor
- Drejt përmisimit të blegtorisë (1964) ... Distributor
- Gurët dekorativë (1964) ... Distributor
- Heshtje që flet (1964) ... Distributor
- Krah për krah (1964) ... Distributor
- Kronikë ngjarjesh (1964) ... Distributor

=== 1970s ===
- Ansambli folkloristik krahinor i Kosovës (1979) ... Distributor
- Ansambli Labëria në Maqedoni (1979) ... Distributor
- Ansambli Marinela në Shqipëri (1979) ... Distributor
- Ansambli ynë në Itali (1979) ... Distributor
- Ballë për ballë (1979) ... Distributor
- Balonat (1979) ... Distributor
- Çeta e vogël (1979) ... Distributor
- Ditët që sollën pranverën (1979) (TV) ... Distributor
- Drejt mjeshtërisë (1979) ... Distributor
- Erinda dhe kukulla (1979) ... Distributor
- Këshilltarët (1979) ... Distributor
- Liri a vdekje (1979) ... Distributor
- Lufton Mujo Ulqinaku (1979) ... Distributor
- Manifestimi i forcës, shëndetit dhe bukurisë (1979) ... Distributor
- Me forcat tona me hov revolucionar (1979) ... Distributor
- Mësonjëtorja (1979) ... Distributor
- Mysafiri (1979) ... Distributor
- Nepër Turqi (1979) ... Distributor
- Ne shtepine tone (1979) ... Distributor
- Ne vinim nga lufta (1979) ... Distributor
- Përtej mureve të gurta (1979) ... Distributor
- Radiostacioni (1979) ... Distributor
- Teatri krahinor i Prishtinës (1979) ... Distributor
- Të zhdukurit (1979) ... Distributor
- Uzinë mishi dhe vezësh (1979) ... Distributor
- Yje mbi Drin (1979) ... Distributor
- Ansambli Migjeni në Turqi (1978) ... Distributor
- Bariu i Matit (1978) ... Distributor
- Dollia e dasmës sime (1978) ... Distributor
- Festa e ujit (1978) ... Distributor
- Gjeneral gramafoni (1978) ... Distributor
- Gjyshi partizan (1978) ... Distributor
- Këndon Atdheu ynë (1978) ... Distributor
- Këngët tona për ty Parti (1978) ... Distributor
- Koncert në vitin 1936 (1978) ... Distributor
- Lumja ti moj Shqipëri (1978) ... Distributor
- Mbrojtja e Atdheut detyrë mbi detyrat (1978) ... Distributor
- Mjelësja e dalluar (1978) ... Distributor
- Ne jemi lulet e partisë (1978) ... Distributor
- Në roje të shëndetit (1978) ... Distributor
- Nga mesi i errësirës (1978) ... Distributor
- Nusja dhe shtetërrethimi (1978) ... Distributor
- Pas gjurmëve (1978) ... Distributor
- Përse kështu (1978) ... Distributor
- Pranverë në Gjirokastër (1978) ... Distributor
- Qytet i lashtë, qytet i ri (1978) ... Distributor
- Riza Cerova (1978) ... Distributor
- Shkrimtari militant (1978) ... Distributor
- Sukses i ri i ansamblit Dajti në Greqi (1978) ... Distributor
- Ushtri e popullit ushtar (1978) ... Distributor
- Vajzat me kordele të kuqe (1978) ... Distributor
- Anës Bunës (1977) ... Distributor
- Ansambli amator Migjeni në Kosovë (1977) ... Distributor
- Ansambli ynë në Greqi (1977) ... Distributor
- Aty është folur me pushkë dhe penë për Shqipërinë (1977) ... Distributor
- Bilbili i Labërisë (1977) ... Distributor
- Biografia e një nëne (1977) ... Distributor
- Blerim i ri në fshat (1977) ... Distributor
- Çeta jonë vullnetare guri i kështjellës së madhe (1977) ... Distributor
- Cirku në fshat (1977) ... Distributor
- Fëmijët tanë (1977) ... Distributor
- Festë e gëzuar (1977) ... Distributor
- Frymëzim nga jeta (1977) ... Distributor
- Gunat mbi tela (1977) ... Distributor
- Heronjtë e Vigut (1977) ... Distributor
- Kukësi i ri (1977) ... Distributor
- Kuvënd i madh i rinisë (1977) ... Distributor
- Matematika dhe prodhimi (1977) ... Distributor
- Mendimi krijues i tekstilisteve (1977) ... Distributor
- Me studentët ushtarakë (1977) ... Distributor
- Mjekësia popullore (1977) ... Distributor
- Nepër tunelin e Qaf Thanës (1977) ... Distributor
- Njeriu me top (1977) ... Distributor
- Një udhëtim i vështirë (1977) ... Distributor
- Odhise Paskali (1977) ... Distributor
- Oreksi i humbur (1977) ... Distributor
- Perimet burim shëndeti (1977) ... Distributor
- Pranverë në zemrat tona (1977) ... Distributor
- Shëmbja e idhujve (1977) ... Distributor
- Streha e re (1977) ... Distributor
- Të rejat tekstiliste (1977) ... Distributor
- Thesarë nën pisha (1977) ... Distributor
- Tomka dhe shokët e tij (1977) ... Distributor
- Tri dekada të filmit shqiptar (1977) ... Distributor
- Urat e Kukësit (1977) ... Distributor
- Vajzat e metalurgjisë (1977) ... Distributor
- Fije që priten (1976) ... Distributor
- Ansambli i Këngëve dhe valleve popullore në Suedi e Norvegji (1976) ... Distributor
- Asdreni, poet i lulëkuqes dhe vegjëlisë (1976) ... Distributor
- Brigadierja (1976) ... Distributor
- Dimri i fundit (1976) ... Distributor
- Drejt dritës (1976) ... Distributor
- Dritë në tunel (1976) ... Distributor
- Fëmijët dhe kukllat (1976) ... Distributor
- Fshati malor (1976) ... Distributor
- Gjithmonë të gatshëm (1976) ... Distributor
- Illegalët (1976) ... Distributor
- Ishte dikur një legjendë (1976) ... Distributor
- Kaliza e grurit (1976) ... Distributor
- Kryeqyteti ynë (1976) ... Distributor
- Lasgush Poradeci (1976) ... Distributor
- Lisharsi (1976) ... Distributor
- Lulekuqet mbi mure (1976) ... Distributor
- Majlinda dhe zogu i vogël (1976) ... Distributor
- Malësorët pas komisarëve (1976) ... Distributor
- Më shpejt, më large (1976) ... Distributor
- Më shpejt, më lart, më large (1976) ... Distributor
- Në gjirin e klasës (1976) ... Distributor
- Në Këlmend (1976) ... Distributor
- Në skajin më Jugor (1976) ... Distributor
- Në udhët e sukseseve (1976) ... Distributor
- Njeriu i punës (1976) ... Distributor
- Normat teknike (1976) ... Distributor
- Onufri (1976) ... Distributor
- Perballimi (1976) ... Distributor
- Për shëndetin e popullit (1976) ... Distributor
- Pika e ujit (1976) ... Distributor
- Populli në këmbë Partia në ballë (1976) ... Distributor
- Qershori dhe gruri (1976) ... Distributor
- Racionalizatorët e një kombinati (1976) ... Distributor
- Shtëpitë malore të pushimit (1976) ... Distributor
- Sistemimi i tokave (1976) ... Distributor
- Tinguj lufte (1976) ... Distributor
- Tokë e përgjakur (1976) ... Distributor
- Tregimi për kohën e lirë (1976) ... Distributor
- Udhët e artit (1976) ... Distributor
- Ujrat termale (1976) ... Distributor
- Unitet që mposht tërmete (1976) ... Distributor
- Valbonë '76 (1976) ... Distributor
- Zonja nga qyteti (1976) ... Distributor
- 1000 pse? (1975) ... Distributor
- Ansambli i Korçës në Kosovë (1975) ... Distributor
- Artilerija e xhepit (1975) ... Distributor
- Bakri ynë (1975) ... Distributor
- Beni ecën vetë (1975) ... Distributor
- Brigada (1975) ... Distributor
- Cifti i lumtur (1975) ... Distributor
- Derri fabrikë mishi (1975) ... Distributor
- Dhëmbët dhe shëndeti (1975) ... Distributor
- Drenazhimi i tokës (1975) ... Distributor
- Duart e arta të racionalizatorëve (1975) ... Distributor
- Fierza ushton (1975) ... Distributor
- Flora shqiptare (1975) ... Distributor
- Gëzimi në sytë e nënës (1975) ... Distributor
- Gjithmon në reshta (1975) ... Distributor
- Gjurmë lirie (1975) ... Distributor
- Jeta e përmendoreve (1975) ... Distributor
- Kur hiqen maskat (1975) ... Distributor
- Kursim, kursim, kursim (1975) ... Distributor
- Lulet dekorative (1975) ... Distributor
- Me amatorët e fshatit (1975) ... Distributor
- Mjekja e fshatit (1975) ... Distributor
- Në fillim të verës (1975) ... Distributor
- Në gjurmët e një tradite (1975) ... Distributor
- Në prag të një përvjetori (1975) ... Distributor
- Për popullin, me popullin (1975) ... Distributor
- Pranë jetës, pranë njerzëve (1975) ... Distributor
- Qylymat tanë (1975) ... Distributor
- Reportazh nga Këmishtaj (1975) ... Distributor
- Reportazh nga Tropoja (1975) ... Distributor
- Roje vigjilente (1975) ... Distributor
- Rruga e suksesit (1975) ... Distributor
- Rrugicat që kërkonin diell (1975) ... Distributor
- Sa më shumë naftë Atdheut (1975) ... Distributor
- Shkolla jonë (1975) ... Distributor
- Shtegtim montatorësh (1975) ... Distributor
- Traktoristja (1975) ... Distributor
- Udhëtim në pranverë (1975) ... Distributor
- Vajza me pata (1975) ... Distributor
- Vatër dijesh, vatër lirie (1975) ... Distributor
- Vullnetarët në metallurgji (1975) ... Distributor
- Zana dhe Miri (1975) ... Distributor
- Ansambli ynë në Kore (1974) ... Distributor
- Arti i punimit në dru (1974) ... Distributor
- Arti shqiptarë në shekuj (1974) ... Distributor
- Brigada e 19-të sulmuese (1974) ... Distributor
- Brigada e shtatë e vegjëlisë (1974) ... Distributor
- Cuca e maleve (1974) ... Distributor
- Duke kërkuar pesëorëshin (1974) ... Distributor
- Duke përdorur rrezatimet bërthamore (1974) ... Distributor
- E vërteta mbi fenë (1974) ... Distributor
- Gjithmonë në rritje (1974) ... Distributor
- Kënga partizane (1974) ... Distributor
- Kujdes zjarri (1974) ... Distributor
- Lufta për bukën (1974) ... Distributor
- Me ndërtuesit e një vepre (1974) ... Distributor
- Midis miqëve të shtrenjtë (1974) ... Distributor
- Miq në festën tonë (1974) ... Distributor
- Misrat hibride (1974) ... Distributor
- Monumentet e natyrës (1974) ... Distributor
- Muslim Peza (1974) ... Distributor
- Nepër rrugët e një qyteti (1974) ... Distributor
- Ngjall liri brigada jonë (1974) ... Distributor
- Një firmë e hekurt (1974) ... Distributor
- Përjetërsi (1974) ... Distributor
- Pranë hapave të para (1974) ... Distributor
- Qyteti më i ri në botë (1974) ... Distributor
- Rozafat (1974) ... Distributor
- Rruge te bardha (1974) ... Distributor
- Shpërthimi (1974) ... Distributor
- Shtatori në trase (1974) ... Distributor
- Shtigje të luftës (1974) ... Distributor
- Sulmon kudo me furi (1974) ... Distributor
- Trofetë e fitoreve (1974) ... Distributor
- Viti 1924 (1974) ... Distributor
- 1 Maj 1973 (1973) ... Distributor
- Ata quheshin Arbër (1973) ... Distributor
- Brazdat (1973) ... Distributor
- Çervenaka (1973) ... Distributor
- Deputeti (1973) ... Distributor
- Dy endjet (1973) ... Distributor
- Fierzë (1973) ... Distributor
- Gjuha jonë (1973) ... Distributor
- Këndojnë fëmijët tanë (1973) ... Distributor
- Këndon Tefta Tashko Koço (1973) ... Distributor
- Krevati i Perandorit (1973) ... Distributor
- Mimoza llastica (1973) ... Distributor
- Mozaik këngësh dhe vallesh kosovare (1973) ... Distributor
- Nëna partizane (1973) ... Distributor
- Nepër fushat e futbollit (1973) ... Distributor
- Nepër unazën e metalurgjikut (1973) ... Distributor
- Operacioni Zjarri (1973) ... Distributor
- Perla e Jugut (1973) ... Distributor
- Sukses i merituar (1973) ... Distributor
- Urbanistika e fshatit tonë (1973) ... Distributor
- Uzinë dhe shkollë (1973) ... Distributor
- Vajza Pukjane (1973) ... Distributor
- Vetëgroposja (1973) ... Distributor
- Artistët kinezë në vendin tonë (1972) ... Distributor
- Basketbollistja nr. 10 (1972) ... Distributor
- Bekim Fehmiu në Shqipëri (1972) ... Distributor
- Delegacioni kinez i bujqësisë në vendin tonë (1972) ... Distributor
- Delegacioni qeveritar Korean në vendinë tonë (1972) ... Distributor
- Duke filluar nga vehtja (1972) ... Distributor
- Ekspozita e arteve figurative (1972) ... Distributor
- Filloi një ditë e re (1972) ... Distributor
- Gurë të çmuar (1972) ... Distributor
- Jehonë këngësh (1972) ... Distributor
- Jeta e një vepre (1972) ... Distributor
- Kapedani (1972) ... Distributor
- Kongresi i 6 PPSH (1972) ... Distributor
- Kongresi i dytë Kombëtar i Studimeve Shoqërore (1972) ... Distributor
- Kuvendet Ilire (1972) ... Distributor
- Lashtësi e një qyteti (1972) ... Distributor
- Me banorët e pyjeve tona (1972) ... Distributor
- Me emrin tënd, Parti (1972) ... Distributor
- Metalurgjia e zezë (1972) ... Distributor
- Motive dibrane (1972) ... Distributor
- Ndërgjegja (1972) ... Distributor
- Para shfaqjes (1972) ... Distributor
- Shkolla tingujt ngjyra (1972) ... Distributor
- Shoku Enver Hoxha në rethin e Matit (1972) ... Distributor
- Shqipëria turistike (1972) ... Distributor
- Teatri krahinor i Prishtinës në Shqipëri (1972) ... Distributor
- Tregim i sharaxhiut (1972) ... Distributor
- Trenistët (1972) ... Distributor
- Vëllezërit Topulli (1972) ... Distributor
- Vështrim përmes mijëvjeçarëve (1972) ... Distributor
- Yjet e neteve te gjata (1972) ... Distributor
- ABC...ZH (1971) ... Distributor
- Bashkpuntorë me artistët (1971) ... Distributor
- Delegacioni i punëtorëve kinezë në vendin tonë (1971) ... Distributor
- Ekspozita Shqipëria (1971) ... Distributor
- Gëzim me Vllehët (1971) ... Distributor
- Hapat e para (1971) ... Distributor
- Kënga e re (1971) ... Distributor
- Lajmëtari i festivalit (1971) ... Distributor
- Malet me blerim mbuluar (1971) ... Distributor
- Mbrohemi duke sulmuar (1971) ... Distributor
- Mëngjeze lufte (1971) ... Distributor
- Më shumë mish për popullin (1971) ... Distributor
- Mësimi për Linden (1971) ... Distributor
- Në gjurmët e novatorëve (1971) ... Distributor
- Në shtëpinë e foshnjës (1971) ... Distributor
- Ninshi, fshat i ri socialist (1971) ... Distributor
- Prova e parë (1971) ... Distributor
- Punojmë, mendojmë, mësojmë (1971) ... Distributor
- Qytetet ilire (1971) ... Distributor
- Rruga e një brigade (1971) ... Distributor
- Shkolla dhe rrugët e jetës (1971) ... Distributor
- Takim me artin revolucionar kinez (1971) ... Distributor
- Të njohim më mirë tokën bujqësore (1971) ... Distributor
- Toka dhe njerzit (1971) ... Distributor
- Udhëtim me detarët tanë (1971) ... Distributor
- Viktor Eftimiu në Shqipëri (1971) ... Distributor
- 10 ditë sulmi (1970) ... Distributor
- 1 Maj 1970 (1970) ... Distributor
- Aksion për ndërtimin e banesave (1970) ... Distributor
- Artet figurative me temën e LNÇ (1970) ... Distributor
- Drita e partisë (1970) ... Distributor
- Ekspozita e miqësisë së madhe (1970) ... Distributor
- Faqe e lavdishme e historisë sonë (1970) ... Distributor
- Furra (1970) ... Distributor
- Higjiena e ushtarit (1970) ... Distributor
- I teti ne bronz (1970) ... Distributor
- Kërkuesit e metaleve dhe Saldatorët (1970) ... Distributor
- Kujdes (1970) ... Distributor
- Me ritmin e jetës (1970) ... Distributor
- Më shumë perime për popullin (1970) ... Distributor
- Miq nga Vietnami heroik (1970) ... Distributor
- Nepër kantieret e Hidrocentralit (1970) ... Distributor
- Në portin e Durrësit (1970) ... Distributor
- Në turnet e natës (1970) ... Distributor
- Nga festivali i shtëpisë së fëmijës (1970) ... Distributor
- Për mbrojtjen gjatë punës (1970) ... Distributor
- Productione Albanaises (1970) ... Distributor
- Tingujt dhe fëmijët (1970) ... Distributor

=== 1980s ===
- Djali elastik (1989) ... Distributor
- Edhe kështu edhe ashtu (1989) ... Distributor
- Historiani dhe kameleoni (1989) ... Distributor
- Kush ishte vrasësi (1989) ... Distributor
- Lumi që nuk shteron (1989) ... Distributor
- Muri i gjallë (1989) ... Distributor
- Njerëz në rrymë (1989) ... Distributor
- Ariana (1988) ... Distributor
- Babai i studentit (1988) ... Distributor
- Bregu i ashpër (1988) ... Distributor
- Flutura në kabinen time (1988) ... Distributor
- Kënga Përmetare (1988) ... Distributor
- Kështjella e këngëve (1988) ... Distributor
- Misioni përtej detit (1988) ... Distributor
- Muzikanti Arbër (1988) ... Distributor
- Një i tretë (1988) ... Distributor
- Një kohë tjetër (1988) ... Distributor
- Pesha e kohës (1988) ... Distributor
- Rekonstruksioni (1988) (TV) ... Distributor
- Shkëlqimi i përkohëshëm (1988) ... Distributor
- Shpresa (1988) ... Distributor
- Sinjali i dashurisë (1988) ... Distributor
- Stolat në park (1988) ... Distributor
- Treni niset më shtatë pa pesë (1988) ... Distributor
- Tre vetë kapërxejnë malin (1988) ... Distributor
- Vija të bardha (1988) ... Distributor
- Binarët (1987) ... Distributor
- Botë e padukshme (1987) ... Distributor
- Drita e diturisë (1987) ... Distributor
- Eja! (1987) ... Distributor
- Familja ime (1987) ... Distributor
- Fizika bërthamore (1987) ... Distributor
- Inciativa masave garanci për suksese (1987) ... Distributor
- Këmishët me dyllë (1987) ... Distributor
- Me blektorët (1987) ... Distributor
- Me detarët e linjave të largëta (1987) ... Distributor
- Në emër të lirisë (1987) ... Distributor
- Një vitë i gjatë (1987) ... Distributor
- Novatorët e portit (1987) ... Distributor
- Përralle Nga e Kaluara (1987) ... Distributor
- Pësëri Pranverë (1987) ... Distributor
- Rrethi i kujtesës (1987) ... Distributor
- Shtegtimi (1987) ... Distributor
- Tela për violinë (1987) ... Distributor
- Telefoni i një mëngjesi (1987) ... Distributor
- Vrasje ne gjueti (1987) ... Distributor
- Zëvendësi i grave (1987) ... Distributor
- Bardhë e zi (1986) ... Distributor
- Bilbil Matohiti (1986) ... Distributor
- Dhe vjen një ditë (1986) ... Distributor
- Dy herë mat (1986) ... Distributor
- Fillim i vështirë (1986) ... Distributor
- Fjalë pa fund (1986) ... Distributor
- Gabimi (1986) ... Distributor
- Guri i besës (1986) ... Distributor
- Kronikë e atyre viteve (1986) ... Distributor
- Kur happen dyert e jetës (1986) ... Distributor
- Kur ndahesh nga shokët (1986) ... Distributor
- Laçi qytet industrial (1986) ... Distributor
- Një jetë më shumë (1986) ... Distributor
- Rrethimi i vogël (1986) ... Distributor
- Rron Enveri rron Partia (1986) ... Distributor
- Rron o rron e s'vdes shqiptari (1986) ... Distributor
- Shqipëria në festë (1986) ... Distributor
- Spartakiada (1986) ... Distributor
- Tiktaku i fundit (1986) ... Distributor
- Tokë e njerëzve të rinjë (1986) ... Distributor
- Tri ditë nga një jetë (1986) ... Distributor
- Asgjë nuk harrohet (1985) ... Distributor
- Bashkëkohësit (1985) ... Distributor
- Bashkëqytetari ynë (1985) ... Distributor
- Brigjeve të Prespës (1985) ... Distributor
- Dimri dhe fëmijët (1985) ... Distributor
- Fanfara e të vegjëlve (1985) ... Distributor
- Fidanishtja e ushtrisë (1985) ... Distributor
- Gurët e shtëpisë sime (1985) ... Distributor
- Hije që mbeten pas (1985) ... Distributor
- Ju përshëndes (1985) ... Distributor
- Kur nis një këngë (1985) ... Distributor
- Manifestim i madhë (1985) ... Distributor
- Me flamujt e Enverit (1985) ... Distributor
- Melodi e pandërprerë (1985) ... Distributor
- Mondi dhe Diana (1985) ... Distributor
- Në prag të jetës (1985) ... Distributor
- Pranverë e hidhur (1985) ... Distributor
- Të mos heshtësh (1985) ... Distributor
- Te paftuarit (1985) ... Distributor
- Tre njerëz me guna (1985) ... Distributor
- Arti mesjetar (1984) ... Distributor
- Asim Vokshi (1984) ... Distributor
- Çdo vijë një vizatim (1984) ... Distributor
- Dasma e shtyrë (1984) ... Distributor
- Ditë në trasë (1984) ... Distributor
- Djemtë e Valiasit (1984) ... Distributor
- Dje pa diell, sot pa natë (1984) ... Distributor
- Drejt frymëzimeve (1984) ... Distributor
- Duaje emrin tënd (1984) ... Distributor
- Endërr për një karrikë (1984) ... Distributor
- Eposi i kreshnikëve (1984) ... Distributor
- Fejesa e Blertës (1984) ... Distributor
- Fushë e blertë fushë e kuqe (1984) ... Distributor
- Gjrmë në dëborë (1984) ... Distributor
- Helmës (1984) ... Distributor
- I çoni fjalë nënës (1984) ... Distributor
- Kur flasim për poezinë (1984) ... Distributor
- Kush vdes në këmbë (1984) ... Distributor
- Letër nga Komani (1984) ... Distributor
- Lumi i jetës (1984) ... Distributor
- Lundrimi i parë (1984) ... Distributor
- Militanti (1984) ... Distributor
- Nata e parë e lirisë (1984) ... Distributor
- Në rrugë të reja (1984) ... Distributor
- Një jetë pranë njrëzve (1984) ... Distributor
- Njeriu prej bore (1984) ... Distributor
- Nxënsit e klasës sime (1984) ... Distributor
- Piku (1984) ... Distributor
- Po lufton Idriz Seferi (1984) ... Distributor
- Pranvera dy hapa pranë (1984) ... Distributor
- Pritje dhe takime miqësore (1984) ... Distributor
- Shirat e vjeshtës (1984) ... Distributor
- Shkolla rrëz Alpeve (1984) ... Distributor
- Shokë të një skuadre (1984) ... Distributor
- Taulanti kërkon një motër (1984) ... Distributor
- Toka të begata (1984) ... Distributor
- Troku (1984) ... Distributor
- Vendimi (1984) ... Distributor
- Kohë e largët (1983) ... Distributor
- Apasionata (1983) ... Distributor
- Bijtë e rrugicave të kalldrëmta (1983) ... Distributor
- Bilbili mëndjelehtë (1983) ... Distributor
- Brigada novatore (1983) ... Distributor
- Dora e ngrohtë (1983) ... Distributor
- Dritat e qytezës (1983) ... Distributor
- Duar dhe zemra bashkuar (1983) ... Distributor
- Energjetika (1983) ... Distributor
- Enver Hoxha, tungjatjeta (1983) ... Distributor
- Fundi i një gjakmarrjeje (1983) ... Distributor
- Gjithmon zgjuar (1983) ... Distributor
- Gracka (1983) ... Distributor
- Nepër ditarët e luftës (1983) ... Distributor
- Një emër midis njerzëve (1983) ... Distributor
- Pishtarë të dritës në Kosovë (1983) ... Distributor
- Roskidë (1983) ... Distributor
- Të përjetshëm midis nesh (1983) ... Distributor
- Tetori i këngëve (1983) ... Distributor
- Zogu pushbardhë-1 (1983) ... Distributor
- Zogu pushbardhë-2 (1983) ... Distributor
- Besa e kuqe (1982) ... Distributor
- Bishti (1982) ... Distributor
- Blerim në bregdet (1982) ... Distributor
- Dy gosti (1982) ... Distributor
- Edhe thërrimet janë bukë (1982) ... Distributor
- Flaka e maleve (1982) ... Distributor
- Kryengritjet e mëdha (1982) ... Distributor
- Muzeu Historik Kombëtar (1982) ... Distributor
- Në ditët e pushimit (1982) ... Distributor
- Nëntori i dytë (1982) ... Distributor
- Në unitet të çeliktë (1982) ... Distributor
- Nga bullonat te makineritë dhe fabrikat komplekse (1982) ... Distributor
- Një ditë në Kutalli (1982) ... Distributor
- Njeriu i mirë (1982) ... Distributor
- Një vonesë e vogël (1982) ... Distributor
- Novatorët e drurit (1982) ... Distributor
- Përvoja e Vrinës (1982) ... Distributor
- Qortimet e vjeshtës (1982) ... Distributor
- Rruga e lirisë (1982) ... Distributor
- Shokët (1982) ... Distributor
- Shtypi ynë i luftës (1982) ... Distributor
- Vellezer dhe shoke (1982) ... Distributor
- Arbëreshët (1981) ... Distributor
- Avni Rustemi (1981) ... Distributor
- Banesat popullore (1981) ... Distributor
- Dita e parë e emrimit (1981) ... Distributor
- Djaloshi prej dëbore (1981) ... Distributor
- Fëmijët tanë një këngë e bukur (1981) ... Distributor
- Gëzofrat tona (1981) ... Distributor
- Gjurmë në kaltërsi (1981) ... Distributor
- Jeta buzë liqenit (1981) ... Distributor
- Jeta e një tribuni (1981) ... Distributor
- Kërcënimi (1981) ... Distributor
- Kur xhirohej një film (1981) ... Distributor
- Lufta për jetën (1981) ... Distributor
- Me alpinistët e vegjël (1981) ... Distributor
- Në prag të lirisë (1981) ... Distributor
- Në skenat e Francës (1981) ... Distributor
- Në udhët e vitit 2010 (1981) ... Distributor
- Një natë pa dritë (1981) ... Distributor
- Plaku dhe hasmi (1981) ... Distributor
- Shoku ynë Tili (1981) ... Distributor
- Shtëpia jonë e përbashkët (1981) ... Distributor
- Si gjithë të tjerët (1981) ... Distributor
- Thesari (1981) ... Distributor
- Tokat e thata (1981) ... Distributor
- Udhëve të hekurta (1981) ... Distributor
- Veshjet popullore shqiptare (1981) ... Distributor
- Volejbollistet koperativiste (1981) ... Distributor
- Aleksandër Xhuvani (1980) ... Distributor
- Ansambli i valleve popullore Eleni Caulli (1980) ... Distributor
- Besniku i Partise (1980) ... Distributor
- Bijtë e heroinës (1980) ... Distributor
- Burim i madhë kursimesh (1980) ... Distributor
- Dëshmorët e monumenteve (1980) ... Distributor
- Dhimbje midis dy brigjeve (1980) ... Distributor
- Ditë vjeshte në Plasë (1980) ... Distributor
- Eksperienca e Buçimasit (1980) ... Distributor
- Ekspozita Shqipëria sot (1980) ... Distributor
- Fontana e pusit C-37 (1980) ... Distributor
- Gëzhoja e vjetër (1980) ... Distributor
- Intendanti (1980) ... Distributor
- Karl Gega (1980) ... Distributor
- Karnavalet (1980) ... Distributor
- Ku burojnë meloditë (1980) ... Distributor
- Mbrojtja në punë (1980) ... Distributor
- Mëngjeze të reja (1980) ... Distributor
- Minerale dhe metale për export (1980) ... Distributor
- Mjeshtret e vogla gjimnaste (1980) ... Distributor
- Mozaikët (1980) ... Distributor
- Ne cdo stine (1980) ... Distributor
- Në prag të jetës (1980) ... Distributor
- Një gjeneral kapet rob (1980) ... Distributor
- Një ndodhi në port (1980) ... Distributor
- Një shoqe nga fshati (1980) ... Distributor
- Nusja (1980) ... Distributor
- Para së gjithash sigurimi teknik (1980) ... Distributor
- Partizani i vogël Velo (1980) ... Distributor
- Pas vdekjes (1980) ... Distributor
- Piktura shqiptare në mesjetë (1980) ... Distributor
- Qitëset (1980) ... Distributor
- Riatdhesimi i ushtarëve grekë (1980) ... Distributor
- Riza Burja (1980) ... Distributor
- Sketerre 43 (1980) ... Distributor
- Traditat tona në lundrim (1980) ... Distributor
- Ylli i të trembëdhjetëave (1980) ... Distributor

=== 1990s ===
- Vdekja e kalit (1995) ... Distributor
- Zemra e nënës (1995) ... Distributor
- Një ditë nga një jetë (1994) ... Distributor
- Plumbi prej plasteline (1994) ... Distributor
- Të burgosurit e galerisë (1994) ... Distributor
- E diela e fundit (1993) ... Distributor
- Kush qesh i funditë (1993) ... Distributor
- Qind për qind (1993) ... Distributor
- Trëndafili magjik (1993) ... Distributor
- Pas fasadës (1992) ... Distributor
- Bardh e zi (1991) ... Distributor
- Enigma (1991) ... Distributor
- Vdekja e burrit (1991) ... Distributor
- Balada e Kurbinit (1990) ... Distributor
- Inxhinieri i minierës (1990) ... Distributor
- Jeta në duart e tjetrit (1990) ... Distributor
- Kronika e një nate (1990) ... Distributor
- Ngjyrat e moshës (1990) ... Distributor
- Një djalë edhe një vajzë (1990) ... Distributor
- Pas takimit të fundit (1990) ... Distributor
- Shpella e piratevet (1990) ... Distributor
- Vetmi (1990) ... Distributor
- Vitet e pritjes (1990) ... Distributor
- Dëshpërimisht (2000) ... Distributor
- Rimodelim (2000) ... Distributor
