= List of Albanian films =

This is a list of films produced in Albania by decade.

== 1950s ==
- The Great Warrior Skanderbeg (1953)
- Fëmijët e saj (1957)
- Tana (1958)
- Furtuna (1959)

== 1960s ==
- Debatik (1961)
- Detyrë e posaçme (1963)
- Toka jonë (1964)
- Vitet e para (1965)
- Komisari i dritës (1966)
- Oshëtimë në bregdet (1966)
- Dueli i heshtur (1967)
- Ngadhnim mbi vdekjen (1967)
- Estrada në ekran (1968)
- Horizonte të hapura (1968)
- Prita (1968)
- Këngë dhe valle nga gurra popullore (1969)
- Njësiti guerril (1969)
- Përse bie kjo daulle? (1969)
- Plagë të vjetra (1969)

== 1970s ==
- Gjurma (1970)
- Guximtarët (1970)
- I teti në bronx (1970)
- Lugina e pushkatarëve (1970)
- Mësim për Lindën (1970)
- Montatorja (1970)
- A, B, C... Zh (1971)
- Kur zbardhi një ditë (1971)
- Mëngjeze lufte (1971)
- Malet me blerim mbuluar (1971)
- Kapedani (1972)
- Kryengritje në pallat (1972)
- Ndërgjegjia (1972)
- Odisea e tifozave (1972)
- Yjet e netëve të gjata (1972)
- Brazdat (1973)
- Krevati i perandorit (1973)
- Mimoza Llastica (1973)
- Operacioni Zjarri (1973)
- Cuca e maleve (1974)
- Duke kërkuar 5 orëshin (1974)
- Qyteti më i ri në botë (1974)
- Rrugë të bardha (1974)
- Shpërthimi (1974)
- Shtigje lufte (1974)
- Çifti i lumtur (1975)
- Beni ecën vetë (1975)
- Kur hiqen maskat (1975)
- Lumë drite (1975)
- Në fillim të verës (1975)
- Rrugicat që kërkonin diell (1975)
- Udhëtim në pranverë (1975)
- Zana dhe Miri (1975)
- Dimri i fundit (1976)
- Fijet që priten (1976)
- Ilegalët (1976)
- Lulëkuqet mbi mure (1976)
- Përballimi (1976)
- Pylli i lirisë (1976)
- Thirrja (1976)
- Tingujt e luftës (1976)
- Tokë e përgjakur (1976)
- Zonja nga qyteti (1976)
- Ata ishin katër (1977)
- Cirku në fshat (1977)
- Gunat përmbi tela (1977)
- Monumenti (1977)
- Një udhëtim i vështirë (1977)
- Njeriu me top (1977)
- Shembja e idhujve (1977)
- Streha e re (1977)
- Tomka dhe shokët e tij (1977)
- Zemra që nuk plaken (1977)
- Dollia e dasmës sime (1978)
- Gjeneral Gramafoni (1978)
- Koncert në vitin 1936 (1978)
- Në pyjet me borë ka jetë (1978)
- Nga mesi i errësirës (1978)
- Nusja dhe shtetrrethimi (1978)
- Pas gjurmeve (1978)
- Pranverë në Gjirokastër (1978)
- Vajzat me kordele të kuqe (1978)
- Yje mbi Drin (1978)
- Çeta e vogël (1979)
- Ballë për ballë (1979)
- Balonat (1979)
- Këshilltarët (1979)
- Liri a vdekje (1979)
- Mëdonjëtorja (1979)
- Mysafiri (1979)
- Në shtëpinë tonë (1979)
- Ne vinim nga lufta (1979)
- Përtej mureve të gurta (1979)
- Radiostacioni (1979)

== 1980s ==
- Dëshmorët e Monumenteve (1980)
- Gëzhoja e vjetër (1980)
- Intendenti (1980)
- Karnavalet (1980)
- Mëngjese të reja (1980)
- Mësonjëtorja (1980)
- Në çdo stinë (1980)
- Në kufi të dy legjendave (1980)
- Një gjeneral kapet rob (1980)
- Një shoqe nga fshati (1980)
- Nusja (1980)
- Partizani i vogël Velo (1980)
- Pas vdekjes (1980)
- Skëterrë '43 (1980)
- Dita e parë e emërimit (1981)
- Gjurmë në kaltërsi (1981)
- Kërcënimi (1981)
- Kur xhirohej një film (1981)
- Në prag të lirisë (1981)
- Një natë pa dritë (1981)
- Një ndodhi në port (1981)
- Plaku dhe hasmi (1981)
- Qortimet e vjeshtës (1981)
- Shoku ynë Tili (1981)
- Shtëpia jonë e përbashkët (1981)
- Si gjithë të tjerët (1981)
- Thesari (1981)
- Vëdhezër dhe shokë (1981)
- Besa e kuqe (1982)
- Në ditët e pushimeve (1982)
- Nëntori i dytë (1982)
- Një vonesë e vogël (1982)
- Njeriu i mirë (1982)
- Rruga e lirisë (1982)
- Shokët (1982)
- Apasionata (1983)
- Dora e ngrohtë (1983)
- Dritat e qytezës (1983)
- Fraktura (1983)
- Fundi i një gjakmarrje (1983)
- Gracka (1983)
- Kohë e largët (1983)
- Një emër midis njerëzve (1983)
- Duaje emrin tënd (1984)
- Ëndërr për një karrige (1984)
- Fejesa e Blertës (1984)
- Fushë e blertë, fushë e kuqe (1984)
- Gjurmë në dëborë (1984)
- Kush vdes në këmbë (1984)
- Lundrimi i parë (1984)
- Militanti (1984)
- Nata e parë e lirisë (1984)
- Nxënësit e klasës sime (1984)
- Shirat e vjeshtës (1984)
- Taulanti kërkon një motër (1984)
- Vendimi (1984)
- Asgjë nuk harrohet (1985)
- Dasma e shtyrë (1985)
- Enveri ynë (1985)
- Gurët e shtëpisë sime (1985)
- Hijet që mbeten pas (1985)
- Melodi e pandërprerë (1985)
- Mondi dhe Diana (1985)
- Në prag të jetës (1985)
- Pranverë e hidhur (1985)
- Të mos heshtësh (1985)
- Të paftuarit (1985)
- Tre njerëz me guna (1985)
- Ura dhe kështjella (1985)
- Vjeshtë e nxehtë e '41 (1985)
- Bardhësi (1986)
- Dasëm e çuditshme (1986)
- Dhe vjen një ditë (1986)
- Dy herë mat (1986)
- Fillim i vështirë (1986)
- Fjalë pa fund (1986)
- Gabimi (1986)
- Guri i besës (1986)
- Kur hapen dyert e jetës (1986)
- Kur ndahesh shokët (1986)
- Një jetë më shumë (1986)
- Rrethimi i vogël (1986)
- Tre ditë nga një jetë (1986)
- Binarët (1987)
- Botë e padukshme (1987)
- Eja (1987)
- Familja ime (1987)
- Hetimi vazhdon (1987)
- Këmishët me dyllë (1987)
- Në emër të lirisë (1987)
- Një vit i gjatë (1987)
- Përrallë nga e kaluara (1987)
- Përsëri pranverë (1987)
- Rrethi i kujtesës (1987)
- Tela për violinë (1987)
- Telefoni i një mënjezi (1987)
- Vrasje në gjueti (1987)
- Zëvëndësi i grave (1987)
- Babai i studentit (1988)
- Bregu i ashpër (1988)
- Flutura në kabinën time (1988)
- Historiani dhe kamelonët (1988)
- Misioni përtej detit (1988)
- Një i tretë (1988)
- Pesha e kohës (1988)
- Pranvera s'erdhi vetëm (1988)
- Shkëlqim i përkohshëm (1988)
- Shpresa (1988)
- Stola në park (1988)
- Tre vetë kapërcejnë malin (1988)
- Treni niset në 7 pa 5 (1988)
- Arjana (1989)
- Balada e Kurbinit (1989)
- Djali elastik (1989)
- Edhe kështu, edhe ashtu (1989)
- Kthimi i ushtrisë së vdekur (1989)
- Kush është vrasësi (1989)
- sq:Lumi që nuk shteron (1989)
- Muri i gjallë (1989)
- Njerëz në rrymë (1989)
- Pas takimit të fundit (1989)
- Sinjali i dashurisë (1989)
- Vitet e pritjes (1989)

== 1990s ==
- Bardhë e zi (1990)
- Jeta në duart e tjetrit (1990)
- Kronikë e një nate vere (1990)
- Ngjyrat e moshës (1990)
- Një djalë dhe një vajzë (1990)
- Shpella e piratëve (1990)
- Vdekja e burrit (1990)
- Vetmi (1990)
- Kush e solli Doruntinën? (1991)
- E djela e fundit (1992)
- Pas fasadës (1992)
- Vdekja e kalit (1992)
- Nekrologji (1993)
- Njëqind për qind (1993)
- Zemra e nënës (1993)
- Dashuria e fundit (1994)
- Një ditë nga një jetë (1994)
- Përdhunuesi (1994)
- Plumbi prej plasteline (1994)
- Vazhdojmë me Bethovenin (1994)
- Kolonel Bunker (1996)
- Nata (1996)
- Bolero (1997)
- Porta Eva (1997)
- Dasma e Sakos (1998)
- Funeral Business (1999) short

== 2000s ==
- Parrullat (2001)
- Tirana Viti Zero (2001)
- Zefi (2001)
- Edeni i braktisur (2002)
- Lule të kuqe, lule të zeza (2003)
- Nata pa hënë (2003)
- Një ditë e mrekullueshme (2003)
- Yllka (2003)
- I dashur armik (2004)
- Vals (2004)
- Luleborë (2005)
- Gjoleka, djali i Abazit (2006)
- Syri magjik (2006)
- Busulla (2007)
- Mao Ce Dun (2007)
- Koha e Kometës (2008)
- Ne dhe Lenini (2008)
- Sekretet (2008)
- Shënjtorja (2008)
- Të gjithë qajnë (2008)
- Trishtimi i Zonjës Shnajder (2008)
- Gjallë! (2009)
- Kronikë provinciale (2009)
- Lindje Perëndim Lindje (2009)
- Muaj Mjalti (2009)

== 2010s ==
- Maya (2011)
- Shqiptari (2010)
- Agon (2012)
- Amnistia (2011)
- Ballkan Pazar (2011)
- Farmakon (2012)
- The Ship (2012)
- Amsterdam Express (2013)
- Ada (2013)
- Femrat (2013)
- 17th Cine Las Americas International Film Festival Closing Night Remarks (2014)
- 6 Idiotet (2014)
- Amaneti (2014)
- BetObey! (2014)
- Bota (2014)
- Seven Lucky Gods (2014)
- Simon (2014)
- Skandal (2014)
- Chromium (2015)
- Drejt fundit (2015)
- Pit Stop Mafia (2016)
- Life Between the Waters (2017)
- Te thyer/Broken (2017)
- Distant Angels (2017)
- You Can Call Me John (2017)
- The Tunnel/Tuneli (2017)
- Bunker (2017)
- Albanian Gangster (2018)
- A Shelter Among The Clouds (2018)
- The Forgotten Mountain (2018)
- The Delegation/Delegacioni (2018)
- Seder (2019)
- 2 Fingers Honey (2019)
- Falco (2019)
- Encounter in the Air (2019)
- Open Door (2019)
- The Unfinished Portrait (2019)

== 2020s ==
- I Love Tropoja (2020)
- My lake (2020)
- Two Lions Heading to Venice (2021)
- Erik (2022)
- A Cup of Coffee and New Shoes On (2022)
- Police per koke (2022)
- Three Sparks (2023)
- Within Love (2023)
- 5 Times No (2023)
- 2 Fingers Honey 2 (2024)
- Golden brothers (2024)
- ADN (2025)
- Vlog#13 (2025)
- Luna Park (2024)
- Kazerma (2025)
- Qypi (2025)
- Luli & Goni i Lemes (2025)

== See also ==
- National Center of Cinematography
- Central State Film Archive
- Cinema of Kosovo
