= Cinema of Albania =

The film industry in Albania comprises the art of films and movies made within the country or by Albanian directors abroad. Albania has had an active cinema industry since 1897 and began strong activities in 1940 after the foundation of both the "Kinostudio Shqipëria e Re" and National Center of Cinematography in Tirana.

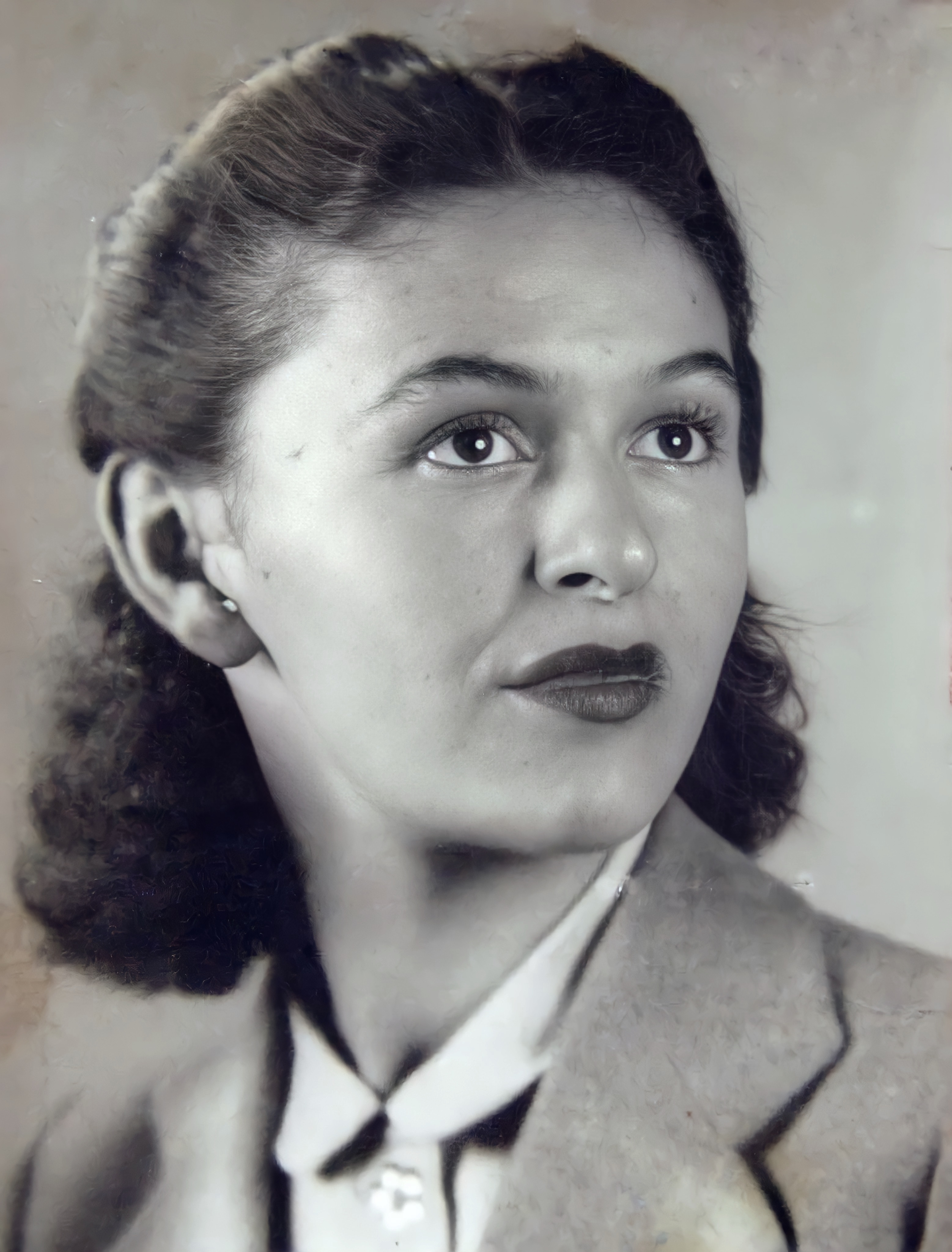
Merita Sokoli is regarded as the first female actor in Albanian cinema.

In consideration to the Albanian diaspora, there are several internationally renowned actors, such as: the Albanian-Americans Eliza Dushku, Klement Tinaj, Masiela Lusha, Jim and John Belushi, Kosovo-Albanians Bekim Fehmiu and Arta Dobroshi, Turkish-Albanian Barish Arduç and Albanian-German Aleksandër Moisiu

Albania annually hosts several International Film Festivals. The most important is certainly the Tirana International Film Festival, which takes place in the capital of Tirana. Born in 2008, the Durrës International Film Festival is also among the most prominent exhibitions held in summer at the Amphitheatre of Durrës.

== History ==
=== Foundation ===
Films were first shown in Albania starting in 1897, as part of travelling shows and to aristocrats. Kolë Idromeno, a photographer, started showing films in 1908 or 1909, and is regarded as the first Albanian to do so by the National Center of Cinematography. The Charles Urban Trading Company shot films in Albania from between 1902 and the Balkan Wars. Albert Kahn's ethnographical footage from 1912 was among the first films shot in Albania.

On 10 September 1942, Benito Mussolini ordered the creation of the Tomorri Society, which would make films in Albania. Mihallaq Mone, who studied at the Centro Sperimentale di Cinematografia, was its director. One of the first Albanian films shot with an Albanian cast was the short film Encounter at the Lake ("Takim në liqen") from 1943. Mone left Albania in 1945, and spent the remainder of his life in the United States.

=== Communist ===
The Central State Film Archive reported that 286 films were made in the communist period. Abaz Hoxha stated that 103 films were produced between 1978 and 1984, and 86 films were produced between 1985 and 1991.

In 1946, Italian films accounted for a plurality of films shown in Albania and still accounted for one-third of foreign films shown in 1955. Albania started importing films from the Soviet Union in the 1950s. 21 feature films and 87 documentaries were imported in 1951, and 9 feature films and 77 documentaries were imported in 1952.

The National Filmmaking Enterprise was formed in 1947, and started producing newsreels and documentaries. The Great Warrior Skanderbeg, a Soviet-Albanian coproduction, was released in 1953, and won an International Prize at the 1954 Cannes Film Festival. In 1950, Jani Nano, Mihal Çarka, Koço Tollko, Petraq Lubonja, Endri Keko and Xhanfise Keko were sent to study for two years at the Moscow Central Studio for Documentary Film. Keko was one of the few female directors in the communist period.

The New Albania Kinostudio was opened on 10 July 1952, and started producing newsreels and short films. It was Albania's only film studio under communist rule. Kristaq Dhamo's 1958 film Tana was Kinostudio's first feature-length film and is regarded as the first one in Albanian history.

In 1952, Daughters of China ("Zhong Hua nu er") became the first Chinese film shown in Albania. The Sino-Albanian Cultural Cooperation Agreement was signed on 14 October 1954. Forward, Side by Side ("Krah pёr krah"/ "Bing jian qianjin"), the first Sino-Albanian coproduction, was directed by Endri Keko and Hao Yusheng in 1964. Jerry Lewis' films were some of the few foreign films allowed to be shown in Albania under Hoxha.

Filmmaker Viktor Stratoberdha was imprisoned between 1956 and 1990.

The 1970s was a period of Albanian cinema in which the depiction of Italians and Fascist Italy's control of Albania were common.

Zana and Miri, released in 1975, was the first animated feature film in Albania.

There were 33 cinemas in Albania in 1945, with around 7,000 seats. The number of cinemas rose from 35 in 1950, to 72 in 1960, and 105 in 1973. The Albanian National Film Festival was held eight times between 1976 and 2001.

=== Modern ===
Kinostudio closed in 1991 and was split into: Albafilm, Albafilm Distribution, Albafilm Animation and the Albanian State Film Archive. The Tirana International Film Festival was launched in 2003.

Kujtim Çashku established Academy of Film and Multimedia Marubi ("Akademia e Filmit e Multimedias Marubi"), the first private film school in the country, in 2004.

The Institute for the Study of Communist Crimes and Consequences proposed banning showings of Kinostudio films, in 2017.

Erenik Beqiri's The Van was nominated for the Short Film Palme d'Or at the 2019 Cannes Film Festival, the first time an Albanian production was represented at Cannes since 1954.

== Notable Albanian Films ==
Title	Translation	Year	Genre
Bijtë e shqipës së Skënderbeut	The sons of Skanderbeg's Albania	1941	Documentary short
Luftëtari i madh i Shqipërisë Skënderbeu	The Great Albanian Warrior Skanderbeg	1953	Epic war
Fëmijët e saj	Her Children	1957	Drama
Tana	Tana	1958	Drama
Vitet e para	The First Years	1965	Historic war
Prita	The Trap	1968	War
I teti në bronx	The Father in Bronze	1970	
Mëngjese lufte	Mornings of War	1971	Coming of age
Malet me blerim mbuluar	The Mountains Covered in Tulips	1971	
Yjet e netëve të gjata	The Stars of the Long Nights	1972	Drama
Operacioni zjarri	Operation Fire	1973	War comedy
Rrugicat që kërkonin diell	The Alleys That Sought Sunlight	1975	Drama
Beni ecën vetë	Beni Walks on His Own	1975	Comedy
Zonja nga qyteti	The Lady from the City	1976	Comedy
Lulëkuqet mbi mure	Red Poppies on Walls	1976	Coming of age drama
Përballimi	The Confrontation	1976	
Njeriu me top	The Man with the Cannon	1977	
Tomka dhe shokët e tij	Tomka and His Friends	1977	Coming of age
Gjeneral Gramafoni	The General Gramophone	1978	Drama
Liri a vdekje	Freedom or Death	1979	Historic
Nëntori i Dytë	The Second November	1983	
Të paftuarit	The Uninvited	1985	Psychological
Një jetë më shumë	One More Life	1986	
Përrallë nga e kaluara	A Tale from the Past	1987	Comedy
Këmishët ne dyllë	The Cloaks in Wax	1987	
Rojet e mjegullës	The Keepers of the Fog	1988	Psychological thriller
Muri i gjallë	The Living Wall	1989	Medieval fantasy
Balada e Kurbinit	Ballad of Kurbin	1990	Romantic drama
Vdekja e kalit	The Death of the Horse	1992	Psychological drama
Plumbi prej plasteline	The Clay Bullet	1994	Sci-fi psychological drama
Një ditë nga një jetë	A Day from a Life	1994	
Kolonel Bunker	Colonel Bunker	1998	Historical
Tirana Viti Zero	Tirana Year Zero	2001	Comedy
Parullat	Slogans		Comedy, drama
Trishtimi i zonjës Shnajder	The Sorrow of Mrs. Schneider	2008	Romantic drama
Koha e Kometës	Time of the Comet	2008	Historical drama
Lindje, Perëndim, Lindje	East, West, East	2009	Comedy
Amnistia	Amnesty	2011	Drama
Falja e gjakut	The Forgiveness of Blood	2011	Drama
Farmakon	Pharmakon	2012	Drama
Jeta mes ujërave	Life Between the Waters	2017	Drama
Mali i harrum	The Forgotten Mountain	2018	Drama
Takim në ajër	Encounter in the Air	2019	Drama
Freestyle to Montenegro	Freestyle to Montenegro	2021	Documentary
Alexander (2023 film)	Alexander	2023	Documentary

== International influence ==
During China's Cultural Revolution, many Chinese audience members were introduced to avant-garde and modernist storytelling techniques and aesthetics through Albanian film.

== See also ==
- List of Albanian films by year
- Cinema of Kosovo
- Cinema of North Macedonia
- Albanian Central Film Archive
- National Center of Cinematography (Albania)
