= List of Albanian submissions for the Academy Award for Best International Feature Film =

Best International Feature Film submissions from Albania

Highlights
- Debut: 1996
- Submissions: 19
- Nominations: none
- Oscar winners: none

Albania has submitted films for the Academy Award for Best International Feature Film (Note: The category was previously named the Academy Award for Best Foreign Language Film, but this was changed to the Academy Award for Best International Feature Film in April 2019, after the Academy deemed the word "Foreign" to be outdated.) since 1996, but only a regular basis since 2008. The award is handed out annually by the United States Academy of Motion Picture Arts and Sciences to a feature-length motion picture produced outside the United States that contains primarily non-English dialogue. It was not created until the 1956 Academy Awards, in which a competitive Academy Award of Merit, known as the Best Foreign Language Film Award, was created for non-English speaking films, and has been given annually since. The Albanian submission is decided by a committee appointed by the Albanian Ministry of Culture.

As of 2026, Albania has submitted nineteen films, but none of them were nominated.

== Submissions ==
The Academy of Motion Picture Arts and Sciences has invited the film industries of various countries to submit their best film for the Academy Award for Best International Feature Film since 1956. The International Feature Film Committee oversees the process and reviews all the submitted films. Following this, they vote via secret ballot to determine the five nominees for the award.

Albania's first three films were historical tales set against the backdrop of the Enver Hoxha dictatorship which ruled Albania for over four decades. Kolonel Bunker (1996) and Slogans (2001) take place in the late 1970s, while The Sorrow of Mrs. Schneider (2008) takes place in 1961 Czechoslovakia.

Greece, Italy, Macedonia, Kosovo, and Switzerland, have each also submitted films about Albania and the Albanian diaspora.

All the films are primary in Albanian. Below is the list of the films that have been submitted by Albania for review by the academy for the award by year and the respective Academy Awards ceremony as follows.

| Year (Ceremony) | Film title used in nomination | Original title | Language(s) | Director | Result |
|---|---|---|---|---|---|
| 1996 (69th) | Kolonel Bunker | | Albanian | Kujtim Çashku | Not nominated |
| 2001 (74th) | Slogans | Parullat | Albanian | Gjergj Xhuvani | Not nominated |
| 2008 (81st) | The Sorrow of Mrs. Schneider | Trishtimi i zonjës Shnajder | Albanian, Czech | Eno Milkani, Piro Milkani | Not nominated |
| 2009 (82nd) | Alive | Gjallë | Albanian | Artan Minarolli | Not nominated |
| 2010 (83rd) | East, West, East | Lindje, Perëndim, Lindje | Albanian, Italian, Slovene, Serbian | Gjergj Xhuvani | Not nominated |
| 2011 (84th) | Amnesty | Amnistia | Albanian | Bujar Alimani | Not nominated |
| 2012 (85th) | Pharmakon | | Albanian | Joni Shanaj | Not nominated |
| 2013 (86th) | Agon | | Albanian, Greek | Robert Budina | Not nominated |
| 2015 (88th) | Bota | | Albanian | Iris Elezi, Thomas Logoreci | Not nominated |
| 2016 (89th) | Chromium | Krom | Albanian | Bujar Alimani | Not nominated |
| 2017 (90th) | Daybreak | Dita zë fill | Albanian | Gentian Koçi | Not nominated |
| 2019 (92nd) | The Delegation | Delegacioni | Albanian, French | Bujar Alimani | Not nominated |
| 2020 (93rd) | Open Door | Derë e hapur | Albanian, Italian | Florenc Papas | Not nominated |
| 2021 (94th) | Two Lions to Venice | Dy Luanë drejt Venecias | Albanian, Italian | Jonid Jorgji | Not nominated |
| 2022 (95th) | A Cup of Coffee and New Shoes On | Një Filxhan Kafe dhe Këpucë të Reja Veshur | Albanian | Gentian Koçi | Not nominated |
| 2023 (96th) | Alexander | Aleksander | Albanian, English | Ardit Sadiku | Not nominated |
| 2024 (97th) | Waterdrop | Pikë uji | Albanian, Italian | Robert Budina | Not nominated |
| 2025 (98th) | Luna Park | | Albanian | Florenc Papas | Not nominated |
| 2026 (99th) | A State Film | Film di stato / Film i Shtetit | Albanian | Roland Sejko | Pending |

== See also ==
- List of Academy Award winners and nominees for Best International Feature Film
- List of Academy Award-winning foreign language films
- Cinema of Albania
