= Red Poppies on Walls =

- Directed by: Dhimitër Anagnosti
- Written by: Petraq Qafëzezi; Dhimiter Anagnosti
- Starring: Timo Flloko; Agim Qirjaqi; Kadri Roshi
- Cinematography: Pëllumb Kallfa
- Edited by: Marika Villa
- Music by: Kujtim Laro
- Distributed by: Kinstudio
- Release date: 9 January 1976
- Running time: 100 minutes
- Country: Albania
- Language: Albanian

Red Poppies on Walls (Albanian: Lulëkuqet mbi Mure) is a 1977 Albanian drama film directed by Dhimitër Anagnosti and co-written by Anagnosti and Petraq Qafëzezi. The film is an adaptation of Qafëzezi's book The Orphans.

== Plot ==
At the time of the outbreak of World War II, orphans in an orphanage in Tirana, under Italian occupation, are forced to clean anti-fascist slogans off of walls. Four orphan friends, Jaçja, Lelua, Bardhi and Tomi, one of whom had a connection with the young anti-fascist Aliu, in protest against the invaders begin to secretly organize plans against some hated collaborators, who were known as servants and spies of the Italian fascists. Two of them, who were also targeted by the illegal communists, were the director of the orphanage and its caretaker.

== Cast ==
- Strazimir
- Enea Zeku
- Artur Hoxholli
- Krenar Arifi
- Kadri Roshi
- Agim Qirjaqi
- Timo Flloko

== Production ==
The Kinostudio produced a film adaption of Petraq Qafëzezi's novel Bonjakët (The Orphans). Red Poppies on Walls was directed by Dhimitër Anagnosti and co-written by Anagnost and Qafëzezi. Marika Villa edited the film and Kujtim Laro composed the music. Filming was done in Tirana. The 1970s was a period of Albanian cinema in which the depiction of Italians and Fascist Italy's control of Albania were common.

== Release ==
Red Poppies on Walls premiered in Tirana, on 9 January 1977. It was shown at the Albania, Si Gera film festival held in Rome from 4–7 April 2019. A 4K resolution restoration of the film was done by Dabimus SRL with financial support from the Association of European Cinematheques and released in 2023.

== Reception ==
The Association of European Cinematheques reported that Red Poppies on Walls "remains one of the country's most celebrated films".

== Works cited ==
=== Journals ===
- Bego, Fabio (2022). "The sound of the other: Albanian–Italian relations and Kinostudio films". Studies in Eastern European Cinema. 13 (1). Taylor & Francis: 3–20. doi:10.1080/2040350X.2021.1938396.

=== Magazines ===
- Nishku, Genta (2020). "The Wretched on the Walls: A Fanonian Reading of a Revolutionary Albanian Orphanage". Krytyka. Krytyka Group. pp. 39–63. Archived from the original on 16 April 2025.

=== News ===
- "Albanian Cinema Week in Rome to start with "Lulekuqe mbi mure"". Tirana Times. 4 April 2019. Archived from the original on 6 April 2025.
- "Premiera e filmit të restauruar "Lulëkuqet mbi mure" me praninë e regjisorit Dhimitër Anagnosti". Gazeta Sot. 8 December 2023. Archived from the original on 16 April 2025.
- "Skënder Jaçe: "Lulëkuqet mbi mure" një nga realizimet e shkëlqyera të regjisorit Dhimitër Anagnosti, restaurimi i filmave shqiptarë një domosdoshmëri e kohës". Gazeta Sot. 5 December 2023. Archived from the original on 5 December 2023.

=== Web ===
- "ArteKino Classics 2024" (PDF). Association of European Cinematheques. Archived (PDF) from the original on 24 June 2024.
- "Poppies on the Walls". Central State Film Archive. Archived from the original on 16 April 2025.
