= Encounter in the Air =

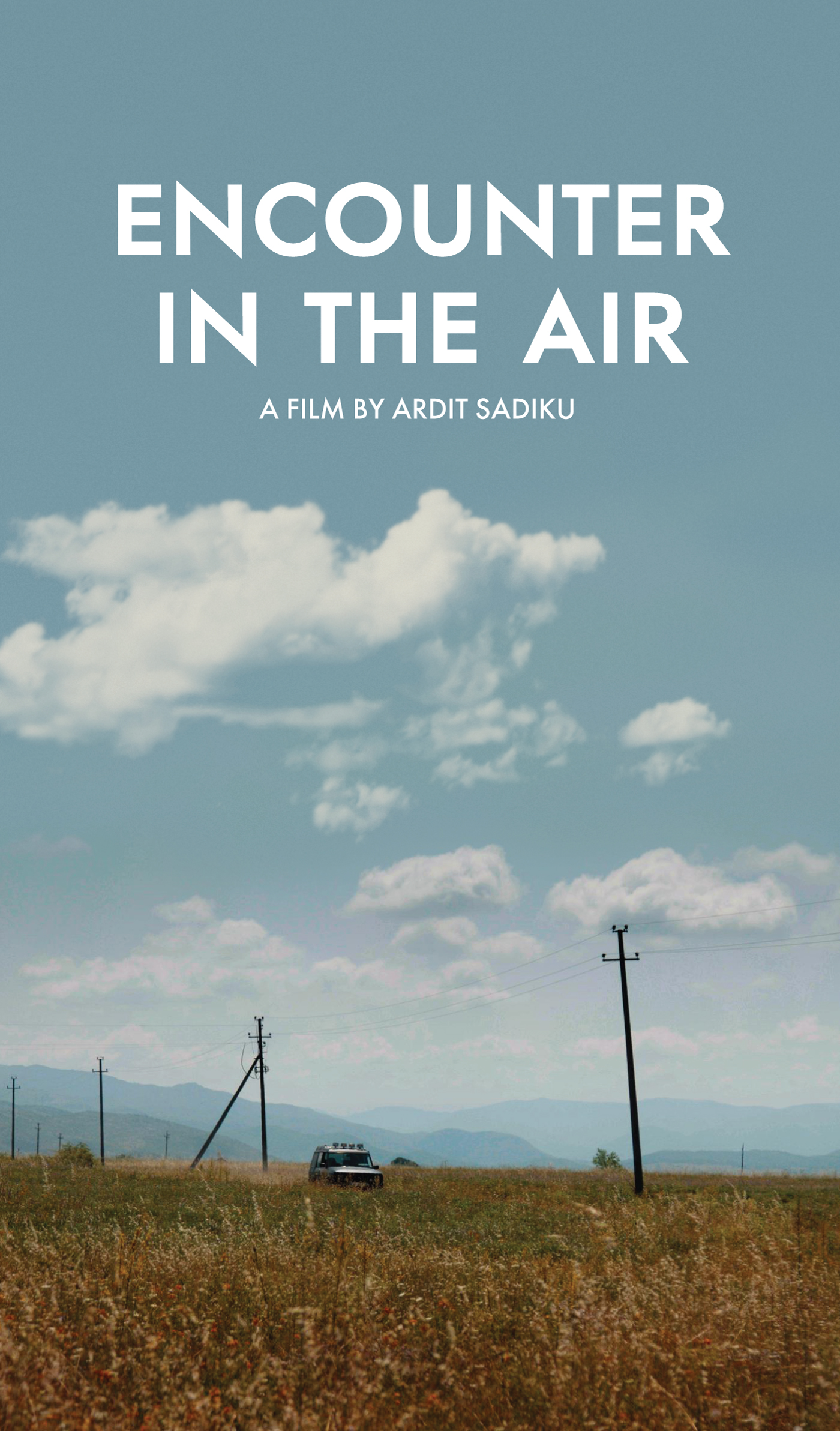
- Theatrical release poster
- Directed by: Ardit Sadiku
- Written by: Ardit Sadiku
- Starring: Herton Meta
- Cinematography: Adi Grishaj
- Music by: Marcus Fong
- Production company: Ardit Sadiku Film
- Distributed by: Ardit Sadiku Film
- Release date: 12 December 2019 (Albania)
- Running time: 90 minutes
- Country: Albania
- Language: Albanian

Encounter in the Air is a 2019 Albanian-language drama film written, directed and produced by Ardit Sadiku. The narrative focuses on a broadcast technician and a young man who has mental illness. The young man, desperate to find asylum in a foreign country, hires the broadcast technician to film a video of him discussing his mental condition — in the hopes that the video will convince foreign officials to grant him asylum.

== Plot ==
Blerim, an employee of a TV station, takes on a highly unusual side gig — one that immerses him in a world of mental illness, paranoia, and blurred reality. Blerim’s colleague introduces him to Drin, an unemployed young man who claims to be mentally ill — despite his neurologist’s belief that his symptoms are merely psychosomatic. Drin, convinced that he must leave his home country in order to become “well,” commissions Blerim to film a video of him discussing his unusual neurological condition — in the hopes that the clip will convince a foreign nation to grant him asylum. Blerim, tasked with shooting the video and somehow convincing his boss to broadcast it on the TV station, finds himself obsessed with the project — to the detriment of his professional and personal relationships.

== Cast ==
- Herton Meta as Blerim
- Todi Kasemi as Drin
- Auron Mimaj as Gëzim
- Sajmir Pepushaj as Ilir
- Sebina Matlija as Mira
- Mirsad Çanga as Albert
- Gerti Palali as Arbër

== Production ==
Auditions for Encounter in the Air started in February 2019, and lasted until April. Filming was done near Shkodër.

== Release ==
Encounter in the Air premiered in Tirana, on 12 December 2019, and was shown at the Tirana International Film Festival. It was one of the possible options for Albania's nominee for the Academy Award for Best International Feature Film at the 93rd Academy Awards, but Open Door was selected instead.

== See also ==
- Cinema of Albania

== Works cited ==
- "Official Selection 2020". Tirana International Film Festival. Archived from the original on 17 April 2025.
- ""Takim në ajër", flet regjisori: Për dy javë fika telefonin". ABC News. 16 December 2019. Archived from the original on 17 April 2025.
- "The film "Open Door" by Florenc Papas, represents Albania for Oscar". Koha Ditore. 28 October 2020. Archived from the original on 17 April 2025.
- Vrapi, Julia (5 December 2019). "Filmi "Takim në ajër" premierë në Tiranë, me temën e emigrimit dhe rolin e medias në shoqëri". Gazeta Sot. Archived from the original on 17 April 2025.
