= Waterdrop =

Waterdrop or water drop may refer to:

- Drop (liquid)
- Tianjin Olympic Center Stadium in Tianjin, China, also known as the "Water Drop"
- Kelvin water dropper, a type of electrostatic generator
- Water dropped from an aircraft as part of Aerial firefighting
- "Waterdrop", a song by Leama & Moor from the 2006 album Common Ground
- Waterdrop, a 2005 Japanese adult DVD by Rio Natsume
- Waterdrop (film), a 2024 Albanian film by Robert Budina
