= Meritas =

Meritas may mean

- Meritas (cloth), a brand of oilcloth and other specialist cloths
- Meritas (education), a former network of primary schools
- Meritas (law), an American network of business law practices

== See also ==
- Merita (disambiguation)
