= Fitim Makashi =

Albanian actor (1944–2026)

Fitim Makashi (10 April 1944 – 31 January 2026) was an Albanian actor.

== Life and career ==
Makashi was born in Gjirokastër on 10 April 1944. Throughout his career, he was featured in a number of Albanian films, including; (The Rrugicat që kërkonin diell (1975),Nga mesi i errësirës (1978) and Death of the Horse (1992).

Makashi died on 31 January 2026, at the age of 81. He was the father of singer Redon Makashi.
