= Sabina Kodra =

Albanian film producer

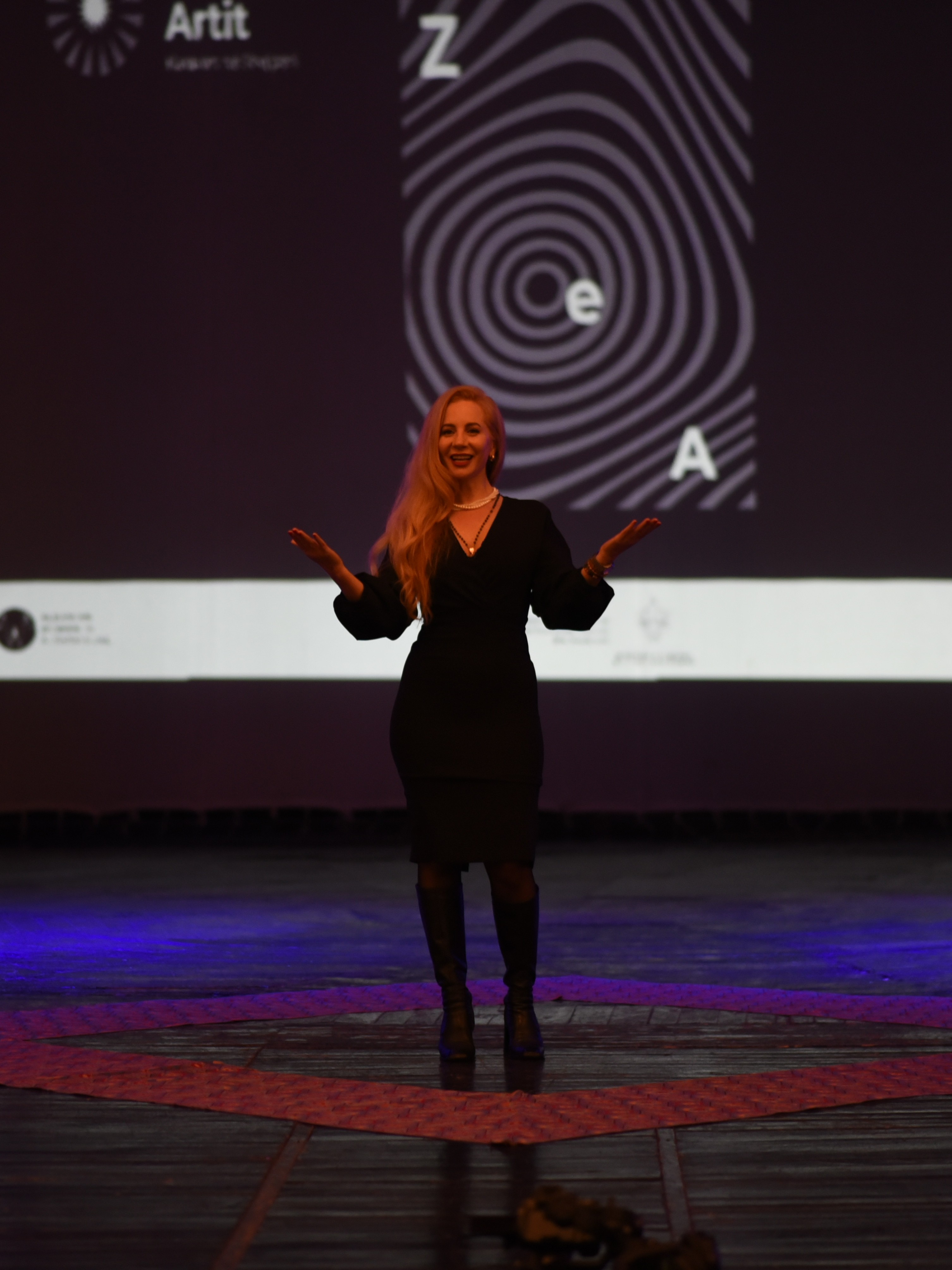
- Education: Academy of Arts, Tirana
- Occupation: Film producer
- Known for: Agon, Bota, Sworn Virgin, A Shelter Among the Clouds, Waterdrop

Sabina Kodra is an Albanian film producer. She is a member of the national list of registered producers maintained by the Albanian National Cinematography Center (QKK). She is known for producing films that have screened at international festivals and for representing Albania at the Academy Award for Best International Feature Film.

Kodra is also involved in the Albanian Women in Audiovisual (AWA) association, a professional organization for women in film supported by the national film center.

== Career ==
Kodra graduated from the Academy of Arts in Tirana in 1999 with a degree in theatre direction. In 2001, she founded the Albanian production company EraFilm, which produces and co-produces feature films and television series.

In 2005, Kodra co-wrote the screenplay for the Albanian short film Luleborë, directed by Robert Budina.

Since then she started producing films including *Balkan Bazaar*, *Agon*, and *Bota*. She also co-produced *Sworn Virgin* at the Berlin International Film Festival.

=== Notable productions ===
- Agon (2012), directed by Robert Budina, which was Albania's selection for the Academy Award for Best Foreign Language Film in 2013.
- Bota (2014), directed by Iris Elezi and Thomas Logoreci, Albania's submission for the 88th Academy Awards.
- Sworn Virgin (2015), with Kodra credited as co-producer, competed at the Berlin International Film Festival and won the Golden Firebird Award at the Hong Kong Film Festival.
- A Shelter Among the Clouds (2018), directed by Robert Budina, premiered at the Tallinn Black Nights Film Festival Official Competition and was reviewed by ScreenDaily.
- Waterdrop (2024), Albania's official submission for the 97th Academy Awards in the International Feature Film category. In QKK’s 2024 annual report, Waterdrop (Pikë Uji) premiered internationally at the Warsaw International Film Festival and was Albania’s official submission for the 97th Academy Awards.

== Selected filmography ==
Title	Year	Role	Director
Agon	2012	Producer	Robert Budina
Bota	2014	Producer	Iris Elezi & Thomas Logoreci
Sworn Virgin	2015	Co-producer	Laura Bispuri
A Shelter Among the Clouds	2018	Producer	Robert Budina
Waterdrop	2024	Producer	Robert Budina
