= Merita =

Merita may refer to:

== Businesses ==
- Merita Breads, a brand of breads in the United States
- Merita Bank, a Finnish bank, now Nordea

== People ==
- Merita, a martyr whose remains are in the Catacombs of Commodilla in Rome
- Merita Berntsen (born 1969), Norwegian beach volleyball player
- Merita Sokoli (1924–2007), Albanian singer and actress
- Lourdes Alves Araújo (1956–2021), also known as Merita Alves, East Timorese activist and politician
- Rita Allison (Merita Ann Allison, born 1940), American politician

== See also ==
- Meritas (disambiguation)
