= Ndriçim Xhepa =

Albanian actor (born 1957)

- Born: 22 January 1957 (age 69); Tirana, PR Albania
- Education: Qemal Stafa High School
- Alma mater: University of Arts
- Occupation: Actor
- Years active: 1981–present
- Spouse: Bardha Xhepa (m. 2010)
- Partner: Eva Alcb (1988–1991)
- Children: 1
- Parent(s): Margarita Xhepa, Xhavit Xhepa
- Relatives: Sokol Xhepa (brother)
- Awards: Merited Artist

Ndriçim Xhepa (born 22 January 1957) is an Albanian actor, considered as one of the best actors of the 80s, for his performance in films and theater since Communist Regime era until today's modern cinema.

== Career ==
He has acted at the National Theater of Albania.He has interpreted about 40 roles, which they stand out in "Prometheus" by Eftimiu, "In life" by Dh. Xhuvani, Robles's "Monserrat", Miller's "Death of a Commissioner", "Under the Lights of the Stage", "Tomorrow is Late" and R. Pulaha's "Stairs", "The Twelfth Night" and "Romeo and Juliet" Shakespeare, "Fernando Krafi wrote me this letter" by Dorst, with which he won the "Alexander Moisiu" Award for Best Actor at the National Theater Festival, 1995, "Death of Danton" by Bühner, "Night of Knocks" in the glass ”of Dh. Anagnosti, "Death and the Virgin" by Dorfman, "Portrait of Dorian Gray" by Wilde and "Chapter Two" by Simon, with which he won the Award for Best Actor at the Nationwide Acting Festival, "Apollo 2004", in Fier. Since 1988 he has been an external lecturer at the Academy of Arts, at the Faculty of Performing Arts.

In the '90s he interpreted protagonist roles in independent productions such as "Caution! It bites ... ”by Gern,“ The beautiful queen ”by Mc. Donagh, "Tomorrow we leave for heaven" by T. Dervishi and "Spousal betrayal" by Pinter. While at the Theater of Nationalities in Skopje he has performed in "King Lear" by Shakespeare.

Successfully activated in about 30 films, from which stand out "Friends" of K. Casku, "Long time away", "The train departs in seven without five" and "Rapists" by S. Pecan, "Love your name" and " The telephone of a morning "by I. Muçaj by K. Mitros," Shadows left behind "by E. Musliu" Butterfly in my cabin "and" Sako's wedding "by V. Prifti," Return of the Dead Army "by Dhimiter Anagnosti, "I love the Wind" and "Porta Eva" by A. Minges, "Plasticine bullet" by A. Minarolli and "Dear Enemy" by Gj. Xhuvanit. He is currently shooting the movie "Prayer of Love", directed by A. Minarolli and Y. Alicka.

== Biography ==
Xhepa was born to the Albanian actor Xhavit Xhepa and to Albanian actress Margarita Xhepa (an ethnic Aromanian). He studied at the Qemal Stafa High School, in Tirana. He has a younger brother, Sokol Xhepa who is a doctor.

== Personal life ==
Xhepa has been in relationship with Albanian actress Eva Alikaj with whom he acted in many films and theaters but unfortunately they split up. He married with Bardha Xhepa in 2010, they have a son.

== Filmography ==
- Pranvere e paharruar ne fshatin e harruar (2019) .... Drejtori i shkolles
- The Delegation (2018)
- Lutjet e dashurisë – Kronikë provinciale (2009) ....Zeneli
- Lindje, Perëndim, Lindje – (2008)
- Sekretet – (2008)
- Eduart – (2006)
- Omiros – (2005)
- I dashur armik – (2004) .... Harun
- Porta Eva – (1999) .... David
- Dasma e Sakos – (1998)
- Përdhunuesit – (1995)
- Loin des barbares – (1994) .... Selmani
- Plumbi prej plasteline – (1994)
- Pas fasadës – (1992)
- Enigma – (1991)
- Unë e dua Erën – (1991) (TV)
- Kthimi i Ushtrise se Vdekur – (1989)
- Flutura në kabinen time – (1988)
- Treni niset më shtatë pa pesë – (1988) .... Astriti
- Telefoni i një mëngjesi – (1987)
- Tri ditë nga një jetë – (1986)
- Hije që mbeten pas- (1985)
- Të mos heshtësh – (1985)
- Enveri ynë – 1985)
- Vendimi – (1984) .... Veroniku
- Duaje emrin tënd – (1984)
- Kohë e largët – (1983) .... Andrea Selca
- Shokët – (1982)
- Rruga e lirisë – (1982) .... Korabi
- Njeriu i mirë – (1982) .... Tekniku i TV
- Thesari – (1981) .... Limani
- Këshilltarët – (1979) .... Bejto
