= The Death of the Horse =

- Directed by: Saimir Kumbaro
- Written by: Nexhati Tafa
- Starring: Timo Flloko; Niko Kanxheri
- Cinematography: Bardhyl Martiniani
- Edited by: Nerman Furxhi
- Music by: René Aubry
- Distributed by: Albafilm
- Release date: April 28, 1992
- Running time: 80 minutes
- Country: Albania
- Language: Albanian

The Death of the Horse (Albanian: Vdekja e kalit) is a 1992 Albanian film directed by Saimir Kumbaro, written by Nexhati Tafa, and starring Timo Flloko, Rajmonda Bulku, and Niko Kanxheri.

== Plot ==
The film takes place in 1974 and follows a respected military horse trainer, Agron, whose regimen is suspected of being involved in a coup against the communist dictatorship of Enver Hoxha. In retaliation, the regime decides to destroy the army's horses by announcing that the horses are sick and must be shot. Agron, a devoted officer who knows that the horses are not sick, offers to shoot a beautiful Arab stallion he loves. However, instead of killing the horse, he takes it into the country and he gives it to some gypsies.

The commissar at the stud suspects what has happened and denounces (spies) Agron. After being arrested and tortured, he is put on trial where, despite testimony from the commandant of the stud who knows the commissar's malice, he is sentenced to fifteen years. His parents are evicted from their flat and sent into exile. Under pressure from her family, his pregnant wife files for divorce and then dies after a backstreet abortion.

Agron is released while the streets are full of jubilant citizens celebrating the overthrow of the dictatorship. With no family to return to, he wanders the streets when he suddenly bumps into the ex-commissar, newly elected to Parliament. The man promises that he did everything he could to save Agron and will now do anything he can to help. Agron stares at him coldly, and the ex-commisar leaves. Agron walks away, alone, in unknown direction.

== Cast ==
- Timo Flloko as Agron
- Niko Kanxheri as Commisar Estref
- Rajmonda Bulku as Meri Agron's wife
- Fitim Makashi as Commander

== Production ==
The International Federation of Film Archives stated that The Death of the Horse was the "first dramatic ficiton film" made after the fall of communism in Albania. It was one of the first Albanian films that critically explored the harsh realities of Enver Hoxha's dictatorship. The plot of the film is fictitious, but Agron is a parallel of Petrit Dume, who was executed in 1975.

Produced by Albafilm, the film was directed by Saimir Kumbaro and written by Nexhati Tafa. Nerman Furxhi edited the film and René Aubry composed the music. Filming was done in Tirana. Rajmonda Bulku said that they were unable to do multiple takes due to a lack of film.

== Release ==
A restoration of the film was done with the scanning being supervised by Shai Drori and the digital restoration being supervised by Steven Kastrissios. Financial support for the restoration was provided by Creative Europe and the Association of European Cinematheques. It was one of 20 films shown by Arte as part of the ArteKino Classics. From 19 to 26 May 2021, the film was shown on the Central State Film Archive's YouTube channel.

== Works cited ==
=== News ===
- "Filmi "Vdekja e kalit" i vitit 1992, shfaqet online nga AQSHF versioni i restauruar". Gazeta Sot. 21 May 2021. Archived from the original on 21 April 2025.
- ""Kishim kompleks edhe një skenë në krevat"/ Aktorja Rajmonda Bulku tregon prapaskenat e filmit "Vdekja e Kalit": Na kritikonin se brezi juaj nuk di të puthet, xhiruam në grahmat e fundit të…". Panorama. 21 September 2021. Archived from the original on 21 April 2025.
- "The Death of the Horse to be shown on Arte". Gazeta Tema. 31 March 2022. Archived from the original on 21 April 2025.

=== Web ===
- "A Season of Classic Films: Albanian Film The Death of a Horse". International Federation of Film Archives. Archived from the original on 21 April 2025.
- "Death of the Horse". Central State Film Archive. Archived from the original on 21 April 2025.
