= Alexander (2023 film) =

2023 Albanian film

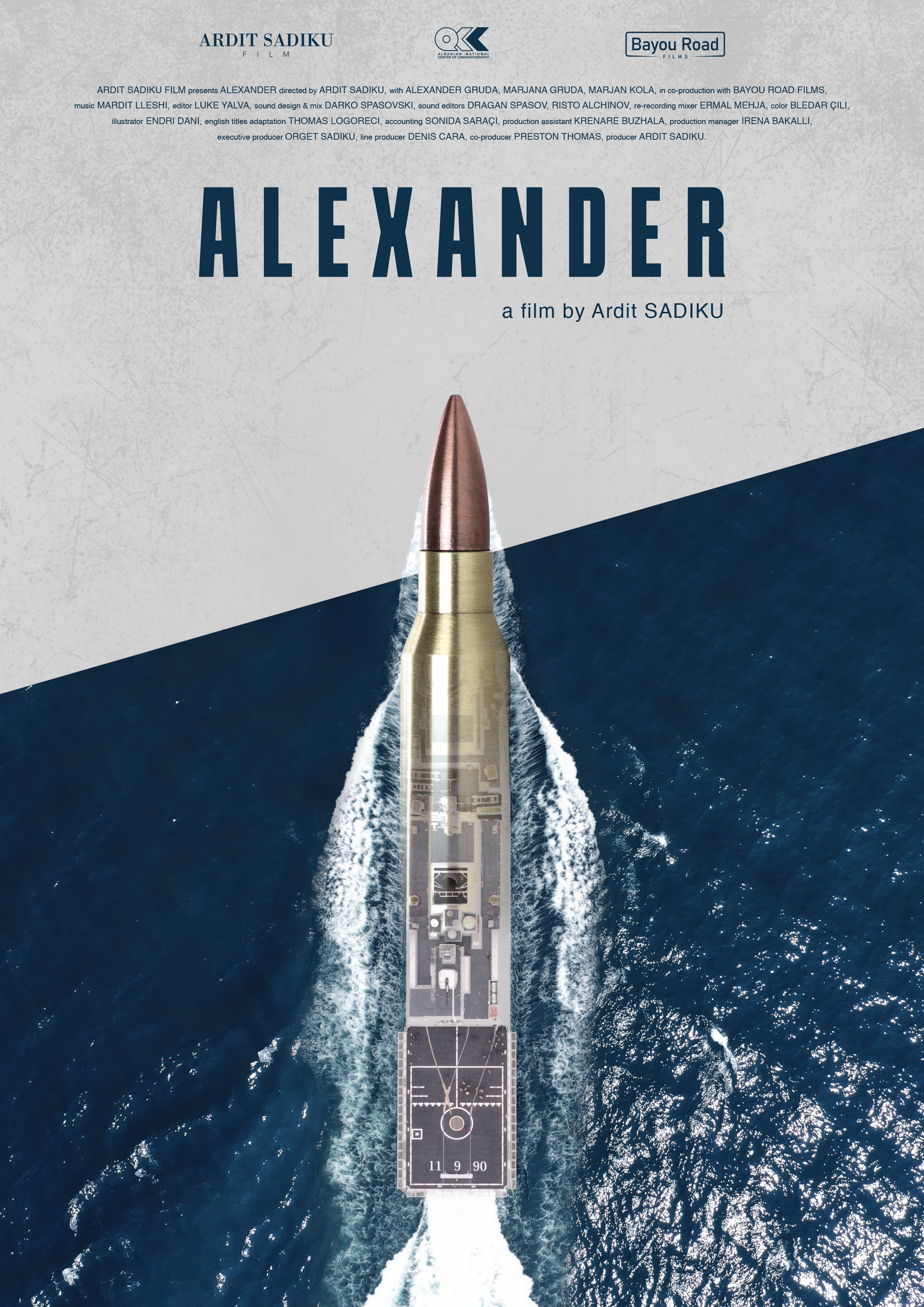
- Theatrical release poster
- Directed by: Ardit Sadiku
- Written by: Ardit Sadiku
- Produced by: Ardit Sadiku
- Starring: Alexander Gruda; Marjana Gruda; Marjan Kola
- Cinematography: Ardit Sadiku
- Edited by: Luke Yalva
- Music by: Mardit Lleshi
- Production companies: Ardit Sadiku Film; Bayou Road Films
- Release dates: 6 August 2023 (Dokufest); 5 October 2023 (Albania)
- Running time: 80 minutes
- Countries: Albania; United States
- Languages: Albanian; English

Alexander is a 2023 Albanian documentary film directed and written by Ardit Sadiku. The film covers Alexander Gruda and his family as they try to escape Albania for Yugoslavia after hijacking a ship.

== Plot ==
During the fall of communism in Albania in 1990, ship mechanic Alexander Gruda undertook one of the most daring feats of recent human history. Shortly after being fired from the Albanian Navy, he and his friends hatched a piratical plan to steal a warship in order to flee the country. Against all odds, they reached Yugoslavia, enduring mortar fire, helicopters, and machine guns. The refugees later emigrated to the West, but the journey cost them dearly as Alexander's daughter lost her life. In America, Alexander started anew as a concierge at Trump Tower in New York. Now, drawn by the past, he returns to Albania in order to attend a memorial service for the daughter he lost.

== Production ==
Produced by Ardit Sadiku Film and Bayou Road Films, Ardit Sadiku directed, wrote, and was the cinematographer for the film. Luke Yalva edited the film and Mardit Lleshi composed the music. Filming was done in New York City, Albania, Montenegro, and Australia. Financial support was provided by the National Center of Cinematography.

== Release ==
Alexander premiered at Dokufest on 6 August 2023, and in Tirana, and Shkodër, on 5 October. The National Center of Cinematography selected Alexander as Albania's nominee for the Academy Award for Best International Feature Film at the 96th Academy Awards, but it was not one of the finalists. It was the first documentary submitted as Albania's nominee to the Oscars.

== Reception ==
On the review aggregator Rotten Tomatoes website, the film has an approval rating of 100% based on 6 reviews, with an average rating of 7/10.

Eddie Harrison, reviewing for Film Authority, highlighted that the film is an extraordinary story that requires to be told carefully and without sensationalizing the content; there’s no animations, celebrity contributors, artful needle-drops; it’s a moving, sobering film that looks at the delicate balance between success and failure, and the personal cost that can go with freedom.

Bobby LePire, writing for Film Threat, praised the last 20 minutes for how it "effectively pull on the heartstrings of every audience member".

== See also ==
- List of submissions to the 96th Academy Awards for Best International Feature Film
- List of Albanian submissions for the Academy Award for Best International Feature Film

== Works cited ==
=== News ===
- "Albania at the "Oscars" with "Alexandre"". Gazeta Koha. 10 February 2023. Archived from the original on 11 April 2025.
- "Filmi 'Alexander' nga Ardit Sadiku, kandidatura e Shqipërisë për edicionin e 96-të të çmimeve 'Oscar'". Gazeta Si. 26 September 2023. Archived from the original on 11 April 2025.
- "Filmi "Alexander" nga regjisori Ardit Sadiku, kandidatura e Shqipërisë për edicionin e 96- të të çmimeve "Oscar"". Gazeta Sot. 26 September 2023. Archived from the original on 11 April 2025.
- Kiang, Jessica (7 November 2023). "United Nations of Cinema: 88 Countries Submit Entries for International Feature Oscar". Variety. Archived from the original on 11 April 2025.
- LePire, Bobby (14 August 2023). "Alexander". Film Threat. Archived from the original on 11 April 2025.

=== Web ===
- "Alexander". Cineuropa. Archived from the original on 11 April 2025.
- "Premiera e filmit dokumentar «Alexander», konkurenti zyrtar i Shqipërisë për OSCAR 2024". Qendra Kinematografike e Kosovës. 3 October 2023. Archived from the original on 11 April 2025.
