= Shame and Money =

- Festival poster
- Directed by: Visar Morina
- Written by: Visar Morina; Doruntina Basha
- Produced by: Fabian Altenried; Sophie Ahrens; Kristof Gerega; Pia Hellenthal; Visar Morina
- Starring: Astrit Kabashi; Flonja Kodheli; Kumrije Hoxha; Fiona Gllavica; Alban Ukaj
- Cinematography: Janis Mazuch
- Edited by: Joëlle Alexis
- Music by: Mario Batkovic
- Production companies: Vicky Bane; Schuldenberg Films
- Release date: January 25, 2026 (Sundance Film Festival)
- Running time: 130 minutes
- Countries: Germany; Kosovo; Slovenia; Albania; North Macedonia; Belgium
- Language: Albanian

Shame and Money is a 2026 drama film directed by Visar Morina and co-written by Doruntina Basha. It stars Astrit Kabashi, Flonja Kodheli, Kumrije Hoxha, Fiona Gllavica, and Alban Ukaj.

== Premise ==
A proud family man struggles to provide as financial pressures mount. Though his mother and brother-in-law offer help, accepting support wounds his dignity. As stability slips away, he faces tough choices about pride versus survival.

== Cast ==
- Astrit Kabashi as Shaban
- Flonja Kodheli as Hatixhe
- Kumrije Hoxha as Nana
- Fiona Gllavica as Adelina
- Alban Ukaj as Alban
- Tristan Halilaj as Liridon
- Abdinaser Beka as Agim

== Production ==
Principal photography took place in 2024, for a drama film directed by Visar Morina and co-written by Doruntina Basha. It is an international co-production between Germany, Kosovo, Slovenia, Albania, North Macedonia, and Belgium. Astrit Kabashi, Flonja Kodheli, Kumrije Hoxha, Fiona Gllavica, and Alban Ukaj round up the main cast.

== Release ==
Shame and Money premiered in the World Cinema Competition section at the 2026 Sundance Film Festival in Park City, Utah and Salt Lake City, Utah, where it won the Grand Jury Prize Dramatic. This qualified it to enter the 99th Academy Awards for Best International Feature Film.

The film was also part of Horizons section of the 60th Karlovy Vary International Film Festival, where it was screened from 5 July to 10 July 2026.

It had its Regional Premiere at the 32nd Sarajevo Film Festival, where it competes for Heart of Sarajevo award in the Competition Programme - Feature Film on 15 August 2026.

In October 2026, Oscilloscope Laboratories purchased North American distribution rights, planning to release the film in early 2027.

== Reception ==
=== Critical response ===
On review aggregator Rotten Tomatoes, the film holds an approval rating of 100% based on 16 reviews, with an average rating of 7.6/10.

=== Accolades ===
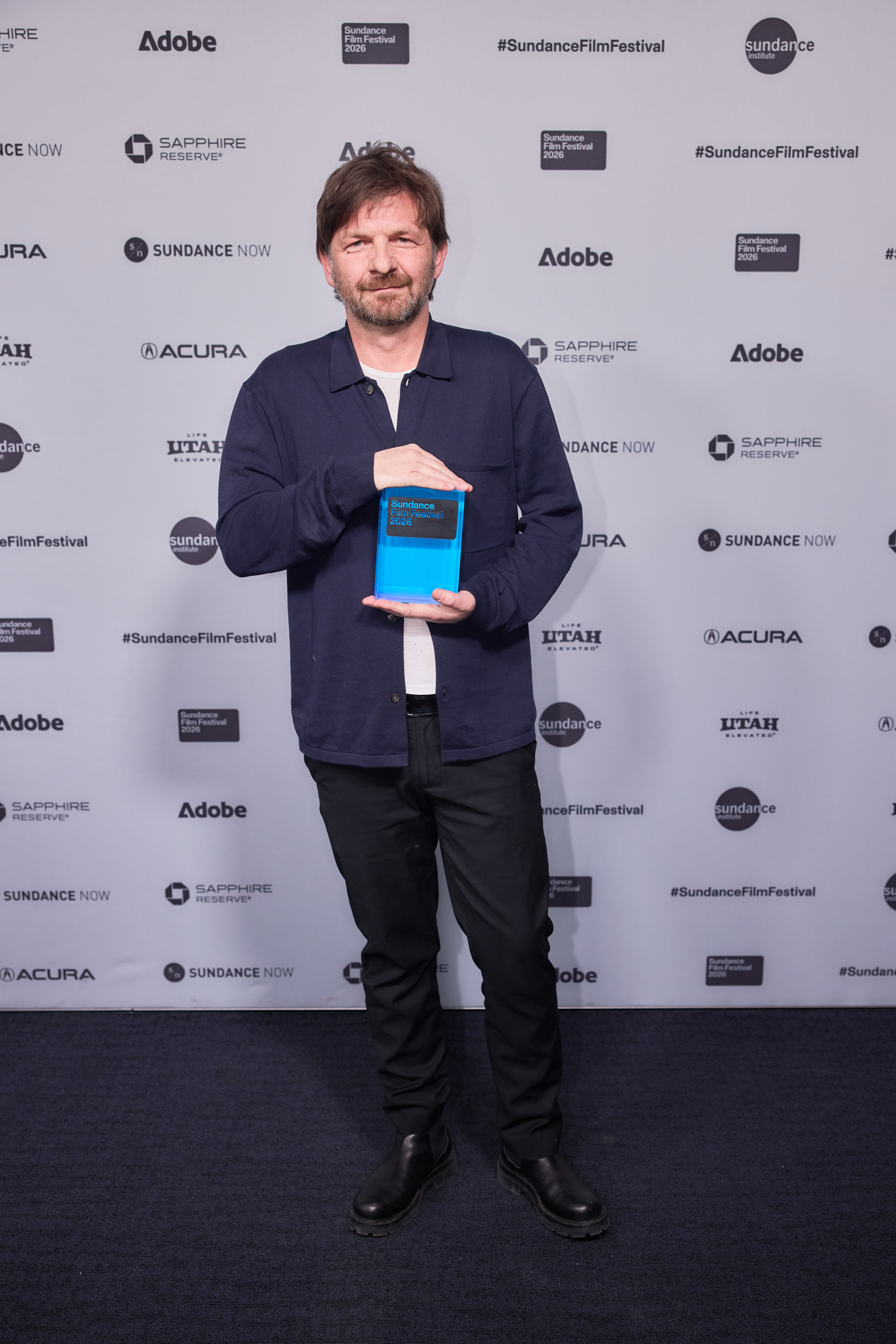
Visar Morina at 2026 Sundance Film Festival

Award	Ceremony date	Category	Recipient(s)	Result	Ref.
Sundance Film Festival	1 February 2026	World Cinema Grand Jury Prize: Dramatic	Shame and Money	Won	
Sarajevo Film Festival	21 August 2026	Heart of Sarajevo	Shame and Money	Nominated	
