= Flonja Kodheli =

Belgian actress, musician, pianist and composer

- Occupations: Actress, musician, pianist, composer
- Years active: 2000–present
- Website: flonjakodheli.com

Flonja Kodheli is an Albanian-born Belgian actress, musician, pianist and composer.

== Early life ==
Kodheli was born in Tirana, Albania to parents who were both artists, as her mother Justina Aliaj was a well-known singer and actress and her father Pjerin Kodheli was a famous actor. Her brother Rubin is also associated with music and cinema being a composer for film and orchestra. The Kodheli family fled Albania in 1993 and settled in Belgium. Having played the piano since the age of eight, she pursued her studies at the Conservatoire Royal de Mons, where she received a first prize for piano and for chamber music. After finishing her studies at the Conservatoire, she became increasingly interested in acting, and attended various acting workshops in Brussels run by different Belgian filmmakers, in particular Frédéric Dumont, Yves Hanchar and Stephan Carpiaux. She attended a theatre workshop run by Boris Rabey, a professor at the Russian Academy of Theatre Arts, which led her to devote herself to acting, and she soon moved to Paris, France to pursue an acting career. In 2010, Kodheli played the sister of Ilir (Guillaume Gouix) in the film Beyond the Walls (Hors les murs) by David Lambert, where she also wrote and performed the original music in the film.

Besides her native Albanian, Kodheli is fluent in French, Italian and English, and has used these to her advantage in her acting career.

== Filmography ==
Year	Title	Role	Notes
2012	Beyond the Walls (Hors les murs)	Ilir's sister	
2014	Amsterdam Express	Marta	
2014	Bota	July	
2015	Sworn Virgin	Lila	
2017	Tainted Souls	Marina	
2018	Forgive Us Our Debts	Rina	Netflix original film
2019	Helvetica	Tina	
2019	The Stork	Vezire	
2020	Exile	Hatixhe	
2024	Luna Park	Alma	Albanian film
2026	Shame and Money	Hatixhe	Albanian film

== Sources ==
- http://www.ungrandmoment.be/flonja-kodheli-entrevue/
- https://iloveitalianmovies.com/2016/07/02/italianmoviestreamingdvd/
- http://www.cine-woman.fr/flonja-kodheli/
- https://news.cinecitta.com/IT/it-it/news/54/63339/flonja-kodheli-conosco-la-durezza-di-lila.aspx
- https://flonjakodheli.com/article-standaard/
