= Waterdrop (film) =

2024 film

- Theatrical release poster
- Pike uji
- Directed by: Robert Budina
- Written by: Doruntina Basha; Robert Budina; Ajola Daja
- Produced by: Sabina Kodra; Carmen Rizac
- Starring: Arben Bajraktaraj; Gresa Pallaska
- Music by: Marius Leftãrache
- Production company: Era Film
- Release date: 12 September 2024
- Running time: 90 minutes
- Country: Albania
- Languages: Albanian; Italian

Waterdrop (Albanian: Pikë uji) is a 2024 Albanian drama film directed by Robert Budina and written by Budina, Doruntina Basha and Ajola Daja. The film follows Aida, a city planner in a small Albanian town by Lake Ohrid, whose life is overturned when her teenage son is accused of rape.

== Plot ==
Aida, a city planner from Albanian town near Lake Ohrid, enjoys a successful career and stable life. After her son is accused of rape, she attempts her own investigation to prove his innocence. As the investigation progresses, Aida is forced to confront her own complicity in his upbringing and attitudes.

== Cast ==
- Gresa Pallaska as Aida
- Arben Bajraktaraj as Ilir
- Adem Karaga as Elvis
- Iancu Paulo as Mark
- Gerhard Koloneci as Ben
- Klodjana Keco as Monda
- Henri Topi as Denis
- Astrit Kabashi as Luan
- Edoardo di Fratta Rossi as Stefano
- Erjola Meta as Judge
- Ilda Pepi as Besa

== Production ==
The film had a screenplay co-written by Doruntina Basha, director Robert Budina, and Ajola Daja. The production team includes producers Daniele de Cicco, Sabina Kodra, Carmen Rizac, Luan Kryeziu, Sasho Pavlovski, and Daniele Segre. Marius Leftãrache composed the music, Marius Panduru was cinematographer, and Enrico Giovannone editor.

== Release ==
Waterdrop premiered at Millenium Cinema in Tirana on September 12, 2024. The film's international premiere was at the Warsaw Film Festival in Poland on October 13, 2024. The film was Albania's submission for Best International Feature at the 97th Academy Awards. The submission comes eleven years after Robert Budinas first feature film Agon was submitted to the Academy Awards.

== Reception ==
The film was well received by critics. Manuel Betancourt of Variety described it as "an engrossing film that works as a modern fable about corruption, masculinity, impunity and the way towns and countries and families alike find it hard to disentangle the way those three forces complement and reinforce one another." Olivia Popp of Cineuropa wrote that "The writers craft a compelling arc, although we rush through many turns in Aida’s tale, which partially holds back the story’s gut-punch potential, even though the overall narrative tracks her evolution with success."

== Awards and nominations ==
Awards and Nominations for Waterdrop
Year	Award	Category	Result	Ref.
2024	FilmFestival Cottbus	Audience Award (Overall Programme)	Nominated	
2024	Warsaw International Film Festival	Warsaw Grand Prix	Nominated	

== See also ==
- List of submissions to the 97th Academy Awards for Best International Feature Film
- List of Albanian submissions for the Academy Award for Best International Feature Film
