= Agim Qirjaqi =

Albanian actor and television director

Agim Qirjaqi

Agim Qirjaqi (27 January 1950 – 28 March 2010) was an Albanian actor and television director. As an actor his filmography was extensive, while as a director his output was limited to some television work. He worked with a number of prominent Albanian directors, including Dhimitër Anagnosti and Gjergj Xhuvani. For his role in the film Lulekuqet mbi Mure he won the Best Actor prize in the Festival of Cinematography of Albania in 1977.
