= Chromium (film) =

2015 Albanian drama film

- Film poster
- Directed by: Bujar Alimani
- Written by: Bujar Alimani
- Starring: Frefjon Ruci
- Cinematography: Ilias Adamis
- Edited by: Bonita Papastathi
- Music by: Pjeter Gaci
- Production companies: 90 Production; Gegnia Film; Elsani Film; Fantasia
- Release dates: 8 July 2015 (KVIFF); 15 October 2015 (Albania)
- Running time: 78 minutes
- Country: Albania
- Language: Albanian

Chromium (Albanian: Krom) is a 2015 Albanian drama film directed by Bujar Alimani. Frefjon Ruci stars as a child who is illegally employed at a chromium mine. Produced by companies from Albania, Germany, Greece, and Kosovo, the film was Albania's nominee for the Academy Award for Best International Feature Film at the 89th Academy Awards, but it was not one of the finalists.

== Plot ==
15 year old Adi lives at the edge of town with his younger brother and deaf-mute mother. He becomes illegally employed at a chromium mine. The only person that Adi trusts is a young math teacher, who empathizes with Adi due to both of them being rebellious.

== Cast ==
- Frefjon Ruci as Adi
- Klodjana Keco as Mother
- Mirela Naska as Kujtim
- Kasem Hoxha as Math teacher
- Denis Shira as Denis
- Bledar Naska as Teacher
- Erjona Kaja as Bardha
- Suela Bako as Woman in mine
- Xhevdet Doda as Engineer
- Albulena Kryeziu as Sokol's mother
- Elton Deda as Singer at RockStock

== Production ==
Companies from Albania, Germany, Greece, and Kosovo produced Chromium. Bujar Alimani wrote and directed the film and stated that the main characters were inspiared by two brothers he knew as a child. Bonita Papastathi edited the film, Pjeter Gaci composed the music, and the cinematography was done by Ilias Adamis. Financial support was provided by the National Film Center of Serbia, Kosovo Film Centre, and National Center of Cinematography.

== Release ==
Chromium premiered at the Karlovy Vary International Film Festival on 8 July 2015. Albania selected the film as its nominee for the Academy Award for Best International Feature Film at the 89th Academy Awards, but it was not one of the finalists. Another one of Alimani's films, Amnesty, was Albania's submission in 2011.

== Reception ==
Clarence Tsui, writing for The Hollywood Reporter, praised Kuci's performance and how "delicate and restrained" the script was in regards to exposition and character relationships.

== See also ==
- List of Albanian submissions for the Academy Award for Best Foreign Language Film

== Works cited ==
=== News ===
- ""Krom" after Tirana comes to Prizren". Telegrafi. 2016. Archived from the original on 12 April 2025.
- Morton, Elise (19 September 2016). "Albania chooses Chromium for Oscars". New East Digital Archive. Archived from the original on 12 April 2025.
- Royo, Fran (19 September 2016). "Albania sends Chromium to the Oscars". Cineuropa. Archived from the original on 12 April 2025.
- Tsui, Clarence (29 September 2016). "'Chromium' ('Krom'): Film Review". The Hollywood Reporter. Archived from the original on 12 April 2025.
- Vilas, Jesús (12 September 2015). "Chromium: The light inside". Cineuropa. Archived from the original on 12 April 2025.

=== Web ===
- "Chromium". Karlovy Vary International Film Festival. Archived from the original on 12 April 2025.
- "Filmi KROM nga Bujar Alimani në Karlovy Vary International Film Festival". Ministry of Economy, Culture and Innovation. 6 July 2015. Archived from the original on 12 April 2025.
