= A State Film =

2025 Italian documentary film

- Italian promotional poster
- Italian: Film di Stato
- Albanian: Film i Shtetit
- Directed by: Roland Sejko
- Screenplay by: Roland Sejko
- Edited by: Luca Onorati
- Music by: Riccardo Giagni
- Production company: Luce Cinecittà
- Distributed by: Istituto Luce Cinecittà
- Release date: 4 September 2025 (Venice)
- Running time: 78 minutes
- Country: Italy
- Language: Albanian

A State Film (Italian: Film di Stato; Albanian: Film i Shtetit) is a 2025 Italian documentary film written and directed by Roland Sejko. It explores 40 years of Albania's communist regime under Enver Hoxha through archival state propaganda footage.

The film had its world premiere in the Venetian Nights - Giornate degli Autori section of the 82nd Venice International Film Festival on 4 September 2025.

It was also selected to represent Albania in the Best International Feature Film category at the 99th Academy Awards.

== Release ==
A State Film had its world premiere on 4 September 2025 at the 82nd Venice International Film Festival in Venice Nights of the Giornate degli Autori sidebar.

In November 2025, it was screened in The Opus Bonum competition of the Ji.hlava International Documentary Film Festival in Czech city of Jihlava. On 27 March 2026, it was presented in the Frontiere section of the Bari International Film Festival in Bari, Italy.

== Reception ==
Camillo De Marco of Cineuropa at the Ji.hlava International Documentary Film Festival, praised the film for its exclusive use of archival material and its decision to tell the story without narration, "historical commentary or captions," relying instead on editing and original sound. He opined that the film effectively exposes the mechanisms of Enver Hoxha's propaganda and its consequences, while its juxtaposition of official imagery with signs of scarcity and repression creates parallels with contemporary political communication.

=== Accolades ===
| Award | Date of ceremony | Category | Recipient | Result | Ref. |
|---|---|---|---|---|---|
| Nastro d'Argento | 2 March 2026 | Cinema del Reale: Siver Ribbon Doc | A State Film | Nominated | |

== See also ==
- List of submissions to the 99th Academy Awards for Best International Feature Film
- List of Albanian submissions for the Academy Award for Best International Feature Film
