= The Delegation =

2018 Albanian drama film

- Film poster
- Directed by: Bujar Alimani
- Written by: Artan Minarolli
- Produced by: Emir Turkeshi-Gramo
- Starring: Viktor Zhusti
- Cinematography: Ilias Adamis
- Edited by: Bonita Papastadhi
- Production company: Art Film
- Distributed by: Seven Films; Next Film Distribution
- Release date: 15 October 2018 (Warsaw)
- Running time: 77 minutes
- Country: Albania
- Language: Albanian

The Delegation (Albanian: Delegacioni) is a 2018 Albanian drama film directed by Bujar Alimani and written by Artan Minarolli, who died before production started. It was selected as the Albanian entry for the Best International Feature Film at the 92nd Academy Awards, but it was not nominated.

== Plot ==
In October 1990, a European delegation arrives in Tirana to determine Albania's readiness for entry into the Organization for Security and Co-operation in Europe. To boost their chances, Albania's struggling communist government plans the release of a political prisoner when things go awry.

== Cast ==
- Viktor Zhusti as Leo
- Xhevdet Ferri as Asllan
- Ndriçim Xhepa as Spiro
- Richard Sammel as Head of the Delegation

== Production ==
The Delegation was written by Artan Minarolli and directed by Bujar Alimani. Minarolli died before production of the film started.

Shooting started on 26 February 2017. The film was an international co-production between Albania, France, Greece, and Kosovo. Funding was provided by the Hellenic Broadcasting Corporation, Kosovo Cinematography Center, Greek Film Centre, and Eurimages. Of the 28 actors, 21 were from Albania and 7 were from Kosovo.

== Release ==
Seven Films and Next Film Distribution distributed The Delegation. It premiered in Albania on 25 December 2018, Greece on 5 December 2019, and France on 22 July 2020. Albania selected The Delegation as its nominee for the Academy Award for Best International Feature Film at the 92nd Academy Awards, but it was not one of the finalists. This was the third time that a film by Alimani was Albania's submission.

== Reception ==
Tina Poglajen, writing for Cineuropa, praised Xhevdet Ferri's performance.

== Accolades ==
| Award | Date of ceremony | Category | Recipients | Result | Ref. |
|---|---|---|---|---|---|
| Warsaw International Film Festival | 20 October 2018 | Grand Prix | The Delegation | Won | |
| Warsaw International Film Festival | 20 October 2018 | Ecumenical Jury Award | The Delegation | Special Mention | |
| Tirana International Film Festival | 3–9 November 2018 | Audience Award | The Delegation | Won | |
| Tirana International Film Festival | 3–9 November 2018 | Media Award | The Delegation | Won | |
| Tirana International Film Festival | 3–9 November 2018 | Best Screenplay | Artan Minarolli | Won | |
| Trieste Film Festival | 18–25 January 2019 | Best Feature Film | The Delegation | Won | |
| Trieste Film Festival | 18–25 January 2019 | PAG Jury Award | The Delegation | Won | |

== See also ==
- List of submissions to the 92nd Academy Awards for Best International Feature Film
- List of Albanian submissions for the Academy Award for Best International Feature Film

== Works cited ==
- "Filming of the film "Delegation" begins with actors from all over Albania". Koha. 27 February 2017. Archived from the original on 6 April 2025.
- "The Delegation". Cineuropa. Archived from the original on 6 April 2025.
- Holdsworth, Nick (19 September 2019). "Oscars: Albania Selects 'The Delegation' for International Feature Film Category". The Hollywood Reporter. Archived from the original on 6 April 2025.
- Poglajen, Tina (22 October 2018). "Her Job, The Delegation and other films from South-East Europe shine at Warsaw". Cineuropa. Archived from the original on 6 April 2025.
- Poglajen, Tina (18 October 2018). "Review: The Delegation". Cineuropa. Archived from the original on 6 April 2025.
