= Theth =

- Village
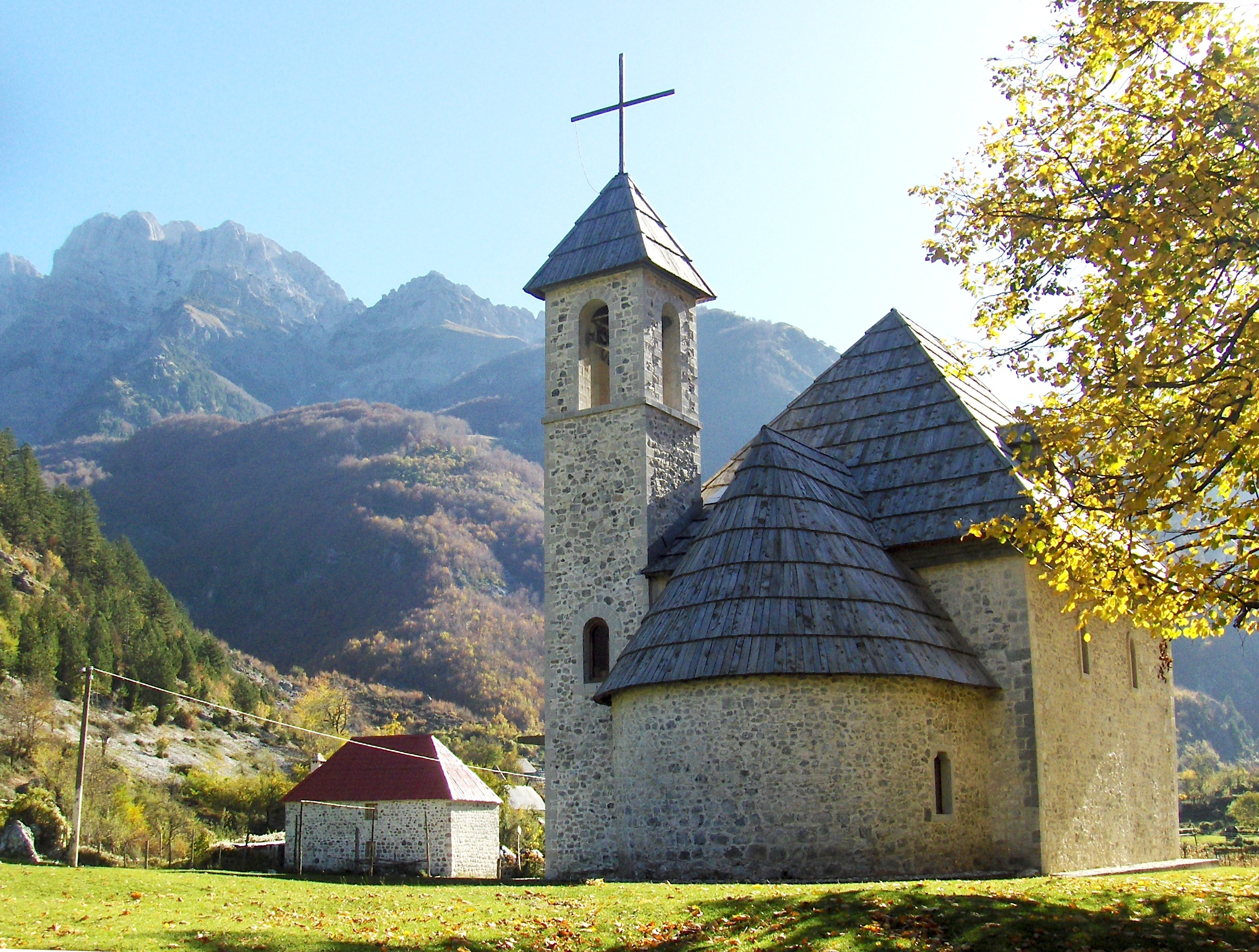
- The Catholic church of Theth

- Location within Albania
- Coordinates: 42°24′N 19°46′E
- Country: Albania
- County: Shkodër
- Municipality: Shkodër
- Administrative unit: Shalë
- Elevation: 750 m (2,460 ft)
- Time zone: UTC+1 (CET)
  - Summer (DST): UTC+2 (CEST)

Theth (Albanian definite form: Thethi) is a small village in Shkodër County, Albania. Following the 2015 local government reform, it became part of the municipality Shkodër, and has been declared a Protected Historic Center and a National Park by the Albanian Government. The community is at the centre of the Theth National Park, an area of outstanding natural beauty.

A new official information center on Rruga Fushe near the Thethi bridge is set to open by the Albanian Protected Areas Agency (AKZM), and administered by the Shkoder County Protected Areas Administration (ADZM Shkoder ).

== History ==
Local tradition asserts a single common ancestor for the community (one Ded Nika) and suggests that the population moved to Theth some 300 to 350 years ago in order to preserve their (Catholic) Christian traditions. Indeed, collective memory sustains the belief that migration to Theth from the lower Shala valley took place in order to avoid conversion to Islam.

Visiting Theth in the early 20th century, the traveller Edith Durham said:

I think no place where human beings live has given me such an impression of majestic isolation from all the world.

Durham described Theth as a "bariak" of some 180 houses and also observed that it was almost free from the tradition of blood feud (known in the Albanian language as Gjakmarrja) which so blighted other parts of the Albanian highlands.

Other notable travellers visited Theth in the early 20th century, including Rose Wilder Lane, Franz Nopcsa, and others. These travelers often detailed and praised the environment, culture and lifestyles of the locals.

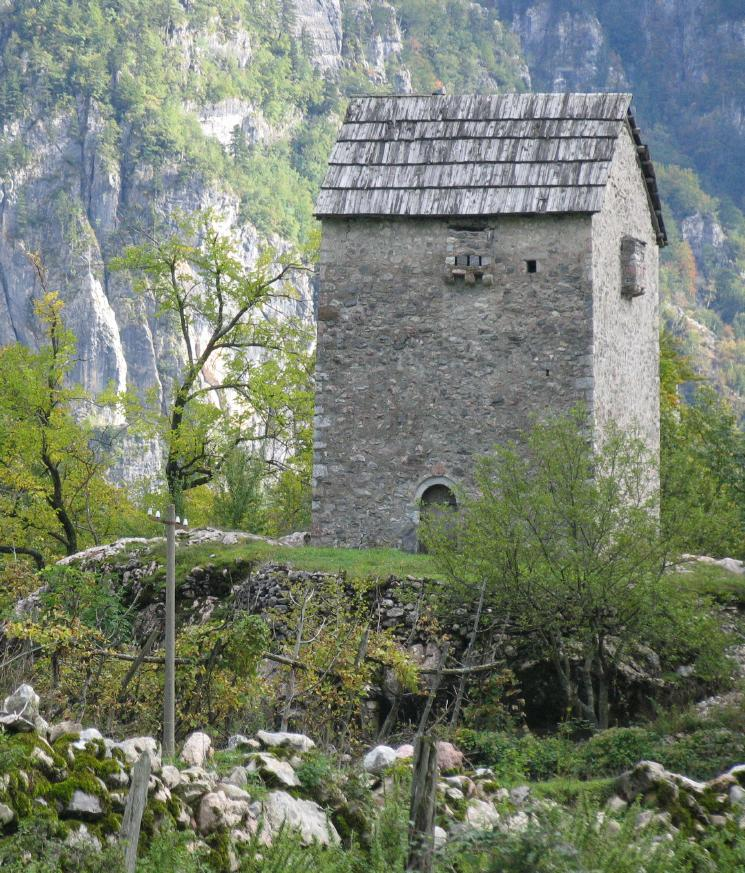
Lock-in Tower of Thethi

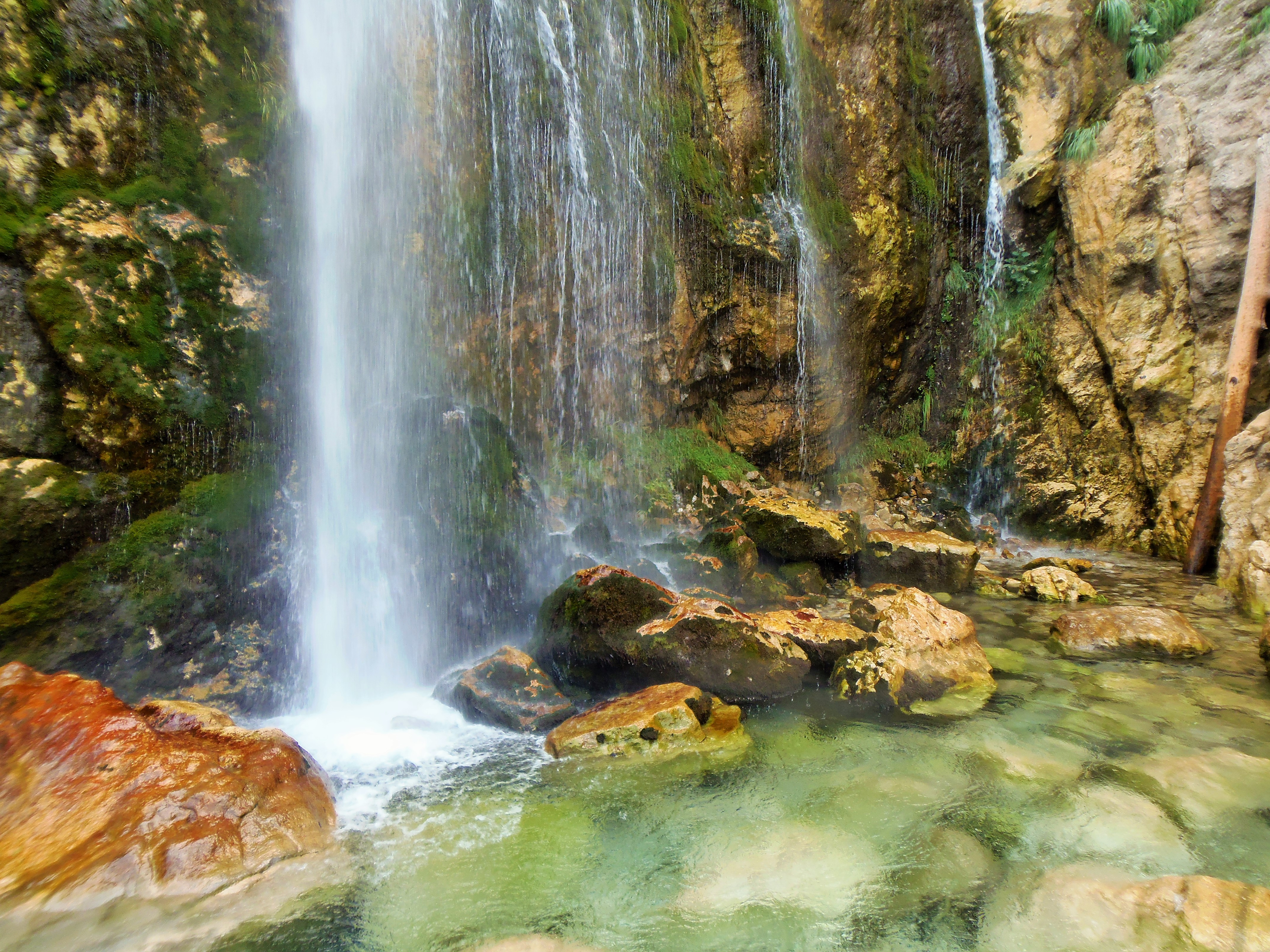
Grunas waterfall

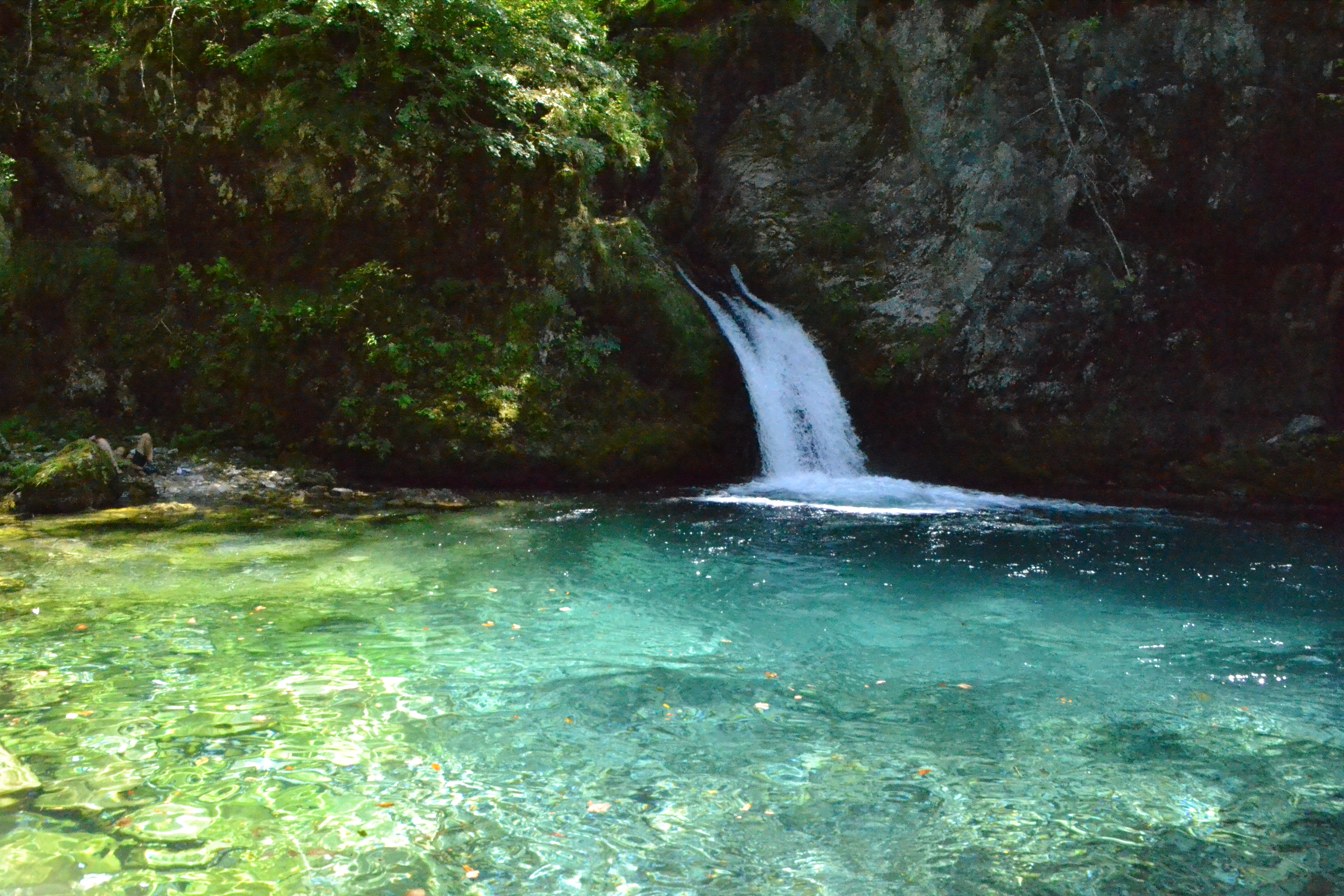
Thethi Blue Eye

Theth remains remote. The single road leading there from the village of Boga has been recently paved and upgraded but is still mostly impassable during the winter months until April.

Although the Kanun (traditional Albanian law) remains influential, Theth has not suffered from the recent (post-Communist) reappearance of the blood feud which has troubled other areas of Northern Albania. Theth boasts one of the very few remaining "lock-in towers", a historical form of protection for families that were "in blood".

Depopulation represents a serious long-term challenge for the community. The population has been greatly reduced over the past few decades and the majority of those remaining occupy Theth only during the summer months. However, the community has a nine-grade school and recent efforts have been made to stimulate tourism. A number of local families offer board and lodging to visitors who come to Theth to hike in the National Park - or merely to admire the mountain scenery.

Apart from the lock-in tower, other attractions include spectacular waterfalls, a working watermill (still used to grind the local inhabitants' corn) and a modest ethnographic museum.

There are now two projects working in the vicinity, aiming at improving and helping the tourist infrastructure in the area. A Balkans Peace Park Project is working towards the creation of a park extending across the borders of Albania, and Kosovo and has taken a lead in recent years in encouraging sustainable and ecologically sensitive tourism in and around Theth (for example by funding the marking of footpaths). Project Albanian Challenge has built a new bridge, which connects Theth to the nearby Grunas waterfalls over river Nanrreth. The project has also improved the marking of the trail to Curraj i Epërm, and has marked another approx. 80 kilometers of brand new trails in the nearby valleys, and created an opensource, free map of the area.

== In media ==
The feature film The Forgotten Mountain (2018) by Ardit Sadiku was filmed in Theth while the last scene was filmed in Nderlysa.

== Burials ==
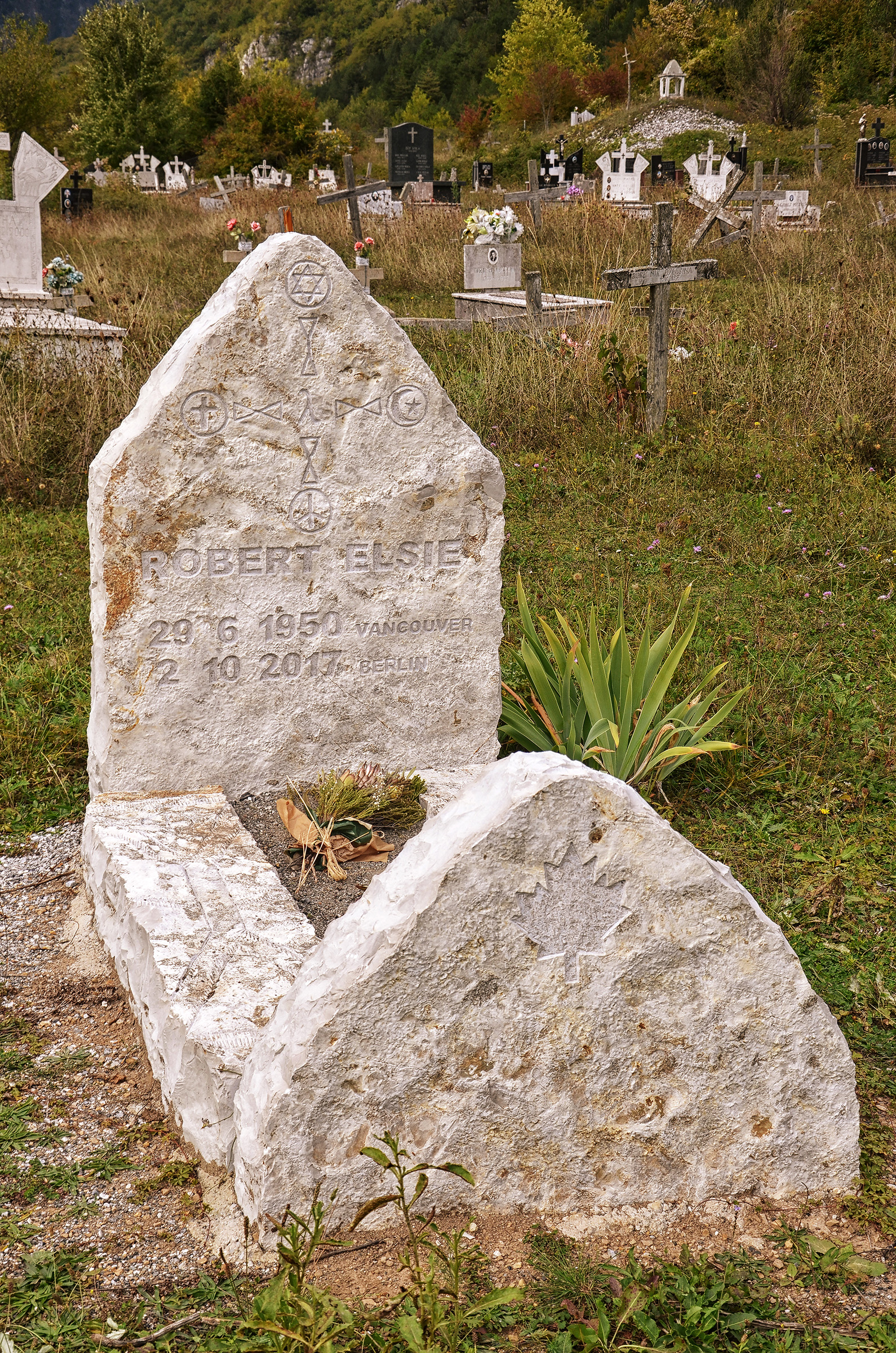
Grave site of Robert Elsie in Theth cemetery

During his lifetime, Albanian studies scholar Robert Elsie developed a fondness for Theth, seeing it as an Albanian "Shangri-La". On October 18, 2017, he was buried in Theth Cemetery.

== See also ==
- Theth National Park
- Albanian Alps
- Shkodër County
