= Luna Park (2024 film) =

2024 Albanian film

- Promotional poster
- Directed by: Florenc Papas
- Screenplay by: Florenc Papas; Glykeria Patramani
- Produced by: Dritan Huqi, Ioanna Bolomyti; Riccardo Neri; Vincenzo Filippo
- Starring: Adriana Matoshi; Orion Jolldashi; Nik Xhelilaj; Flonja Kodheli
- Cinematography: Simos Sarketzis
- Edited by: Federica Forcesi
- Music by: Matej Merlić
- Production companies: On Film Production; Lupin Film; Atalante; Studio Corvus; Buka Film; Hellenic Broadcasting Corporation - ERT
- Release date: 4 November 2024 (TIFF)
- Running time: 101 minutes
- Countries: Albania; Italy; Greece; Croatia; Kosovo
- Language: Albanian

Luna Park is a 2024 drama film co-written and directed by Florenc Papas. The film set in 1997 Albanian civil unrest, focuses on a mother and son's hardship. It had its premiere at the Thessaloniki International Film Festival on 4 November 2024. It was nominated for the Greek Minority Co-Production Film Award at the Hellenic Film Academy Awards.

The film was selected to represent Albania in the Best International Feature Film category at the 98th Academy Awards, but it was not nominated.

== Synopsis ==
Set against the backdrop of Albania’s 1997 Albanian civil unrest, Luna Park traces the agonising journey of Mira, a single mother from Elbasan, Albania, and her young son Toni. Mira, desperate to secure a future, becomes entangled in high-risk investments and a brief romance with Berti, a charismatic figure behind a dubious financial scheme. As the nation descends into chaos following the collapse of pyramid schemes, mother and son are forced to flee. Their escape leads them to the Greek border, where danger and separation await. Alone in a foreign land, Toni embarks on a search for the father he never knew, finding a fragile sense of peace near the shuttered Luna Park, a haunting emblem of lost innocence and fragile hope in a fractured world.

== Cast ==
- Adriana Matoshi as Mira
- Orion Jolldashi as Toni
- Nik Xhelilaj as Berti
- Flonja Kodheli as Alma
- Suela Bako
- Olivia Hysolli

== Production ==
The film directed by Florenc Papas, is an Albanian-Italian-Greek-Croatian-Kosovar co-production. It is produced by On Film Production, Lupin Film, Atalante Productions, Studio Corvus and Buka Production. The project was supported by National Center of Cinematography (Albania), the Greek Film Centre, Hellenic Broadcasting Corporation (ERT), the Croatian Audiovisual Centre, the Kosovo Cinematography Center and the SEE Cinema Network. It completed post production in September 2024.

== Release ==
Luna Park had its World Premiere at the 55th International Film Festival of India on 26 November in the Cinema of the World.

On 20 March 2025, it competed in Balkan Competition section of the Sofia International Film Festival.

== Reception ==
Davide Abbatescianni of Cineuropa at the Thessaloniki International Film Festival, praised Luna Park for its strong performances and expressive technical execution. Abbatescianni highlighted Adriana Matoshi’s portrayal as marked by "self-aware despair," and noted that Orion Jolldashi "manages to convey both the strength and the fragility of a fatherless teenage boy" navigating trust and hope. Abbatescianni commended the stylised writing of Berti’s character, which "helps keep the viewers focused on Toni and his mother," emphasizing that the film is not a David and Goliath tale but "about collecting the remnants of what’s left and looking ahead before being sucked into a vortex of despair." Concluding his review, Abbatescianni lauded Durim Neziri’s production design and Simos Sarketzis’s cinematography for crafting a "gloomy atmosphere" and a vivid depiction of late-1990s Albania, while calling Matej Merlic’s score "a nice touch" that avoids over-dramatization.

== Accolades ==
Award	Ceremony date	Category	Recipient(s)	Result	Ref.
Hellenic Film Academy Awards	11 June 2025	Greek Minority Co-Production Film Award	Luna Park	Nominated	

== See also ==
- List of submissions to the 98th Academy Awards for Best International Feature Film
- List of Albanian submissions for the Academy Award for Best International Feature Film
