= Bota (film) =

2014 film by Iris Elezi and Thomas Logoreci

- Film poster
- Directed by: Iris Elezi; Thomas Logoreci
- Written by: Iris Elezi; Thomas Logoreci
- Starring: Flonja Kodheli
- Cinematography: Ramiro Civita
- Edited by: Walter Fasano
- Distributed by: Erafilm
- Release date: 5 July 2014 (Karlovy)
- Running time: 104 minutes
- Country: Albania
- Languages: Albanian; Italian

Bota is a 2014 Albanian drama film directed and written by Iris Elezi and Thomas Logoreci. The film was selected as the Albanian entry for the Best Foreign Language Film at the 88th Academy Awards, but it was not nominated.

== Plot ==
The families of Juli, Nora and Beni were resettled during the communist rule to a small village in no man's land on the edge of a swamp. In present-day Albania, Juli works at her uncle Beni's café Bota. She lives with her grandmother Noje and takes care of her. Nora, Juli's friend, becomes Beni's mistress. Beni wants to expand the café and tries to attract new customers. With the expansion of the highway near the village, the peaceful life of the protagonists ends.

== Cast ==
- Flonja Kodheli as July
- Artur Gorishti as Beni
- Fioralba Kryemadhi as Nora
- Tinka Kurti as Noje
- Luca Lionello as Filipo

== Production ==
Bota is the Albanian word for "The World". Iris Elezi and Thomas Logoreci co-wrote and directed the film. Funding was provided by the National Center of Cinematography, Kosovo Cinematography Center, Eurimages, Rai Movie, and RTSH. The film was an international coproduction between Albania, Italy, and Kosovo.

== Release ==
Erafilm distributed the film in Albania and worldwide. Premiering at the Karlovy Vary International Film Festival, it was also shown at the Helsinki International Film Festival and Arras Film Festival. Albania's Ministry of Economy, Culture and Innovation selected Bota as its nominee for the Academy Award for Best International Feature Film at the 88th Academy Awards, but it was not one of the finalists.

== Reception ==
Stephen Dalton, writing for The Hollywood Reporter, praised the "vintage local pop ballads" as a "strong selling point" for the film and "its attractive panoramic" of Albania. Alissa Simon, writing for Variety, praised the film for including obscure pieces of Albanian history and nods to Albanian cinema and literature.

== See also ==
- List of submissions to the 88th Academy Awards for Best Foreign Language Film
- List of Albanian submissions for the Academy Award for Best Foreign Language Film

== Works cited ==
=== News ===
- Holdsworth, Nick (21 September 2015). "Oscars: Albania Nominates 'Bota' for Foreign-Language Category". The Hollywood Reporter. Archived from the original on 6 April 2025.
- Dalton, Stephen (23 December 2015). "'Bota': Film Review". The Hollywood Reporter. Archived from the original on 6 April 2025.
- Simon, Alissa (30 November 2015). "Film Review: 'Bota'". Variety. Archived from the original on 6 April 2025.

=== Web ===
- "Bota". Erafilm. Archived from the original on 6 April 2025.
- "Bota". SFFILM. Archived from the original on 6 April 2025.
- "Film Bota - New York Premiere". Albanian Institute New York. 31 May 2015. Archived from the original on 6 April 2025.
- Reed, Leslie (4 January 2016). "Former student's film enjoys recognition, honors". University of Nebraska–Lincoln. Archived from the original on 6 April 2025.
