= Merita Sokoli =

Albanian actress

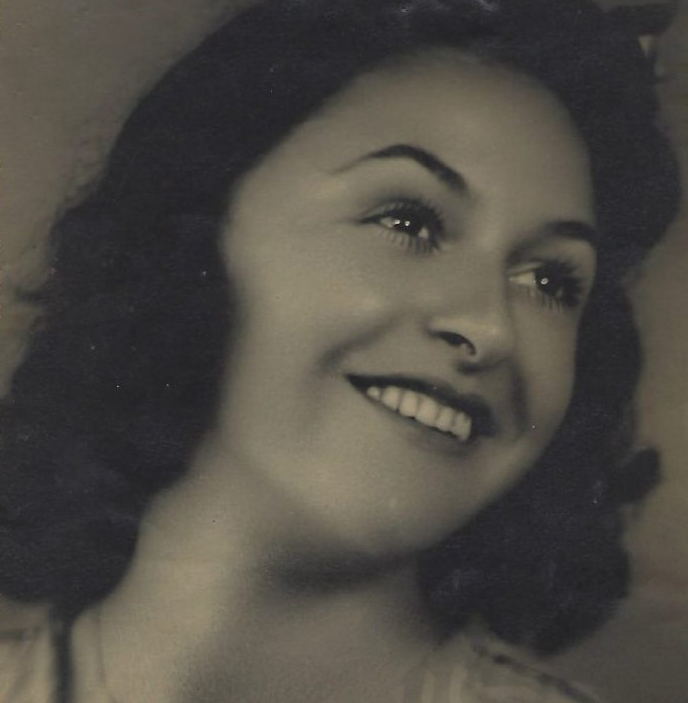
Merita Sokoli

Merita Sokoli, also known as Merita Sokoli Tezha (29 December 1924, Korça – 4 November 2007, United States), was an Albanian soprano singer and actress.

== Biography ==
Merita Sokoli was born on December 29, 1924, in the city of Korça, Albania. She was known for her rare talent for music and her wonderful voice, which attracted the attention of music teacher Prof. Sotir Kozmo at the National Lyceum of Korça. In the period between 1939 and 1944 she studied in Italy, at the National Academy of Santa Cecilia in Rome (Accademia Nazionale di Santa Cecilia).

Merita Sokoli is recognized as the first Albanian actress with the lead role in the first Albanian short film "Meeting at the Lake," which was shot in Shkodra and at the Manastir of St. Naum in Pogradec in 1942. However, the film was only shown in Italy.

She became active in the 'National Theater of Albania in 1945, performing alongside notable actors such as Naim Frashëri, Lazër Filipi, Prokop Mima, and Liza Vorfi. Merita Sokoli's talent and contributions to Albanian art were highly regarded, but her career was affected by the oppressive communist regime in Albania, which limited her opportunities to shine and damaged Albanian art.

== See also ==
- Cinema of Albania
