= Pharmakon (film) =

2012 film by Joni Shanaj

- Directed by: Joni Shanaj
- Written by: Joni Shanaj
- Produced by: Mevlan Shanaj
- Starring: Klevis Bega
- Cinematography: Ram Shani; Ji-Hwan Park
- Music by: Anton Lennartsson
- Release date: 12 April 2012
- Running time: 134 minutes
- Country: Albania
- Language: Albanian
- Budget: >26.5 million lek

Pharmakon is a 2012 Albanian drama film directed and written by Joni Shanaj in his feature film directorial debut. The film was selected as Albania's nominee for the Academy Award for Best International Feature Film at the 85th Academy Awards, but it was not one of the finalists.

== Plot ==
Branko is a pharmacist, but cannot find any other job besides the one he has working at his father's pharmacy near Tirana. His father Sokrat is involved in drug smuggling. Branko falls in love with Sara, a nurse, and she tells him that she was sexually abused by Sokrat as he promised to save the life of her sick mother.

== Cast ==
- Klevis Bega as Branko
- Olta Gixhari as Sara
- Niko Kanxheri as Dr. Sokrat
- Vasil Goda as Sherifi
- Pano Aliu as Gjergji

== Production ==
Touchy Feely Films and Zig-Zag Film produced Pharmakon. The film was directed and written by Joni Shanaj, in his directorial debut for a feature film. Pharmakon was selected for the film's name as the main character is a pharmacist and his father is involved in drug smuggling.

The funding for the film was solely from Albania. Shanaj said that the budget was so low that "it was shot almost for free". 24 million lek was provided by the National Center of Cinematography and 2.5 million lek from RTSH.

== Release ==
Pharmakon premiered in Tirana on 12 April 2012. On 21 September, the National Center of Cinematography selected the film as its nominee for the Academy Award for Best International Feature Film at the 85th Academy Awards, but it was not one of the finalists. It was the only film made in Albania that met the qualifications to be submitted.

== Reception ==
Mark Cousins, writing in Sight and Sound, praised the film as a masterpiece.

== See also ==
- List of submissions to the 85th Academy Awards for Best Foreign Language Film
- List of Albanian submissions for the Academy Award for Best Foreign Language Film

== Works cited ==
- "Albanian film, Pharmakon, to make premiere". Tirana Times. 2012. Archived from the original on 7 April 2025.
- "Filmi: "Pharmakon" i Joni Shanajt përfaqëson Shqipërinë në "Oskar"". Gazeta Shqip. 27 September 2012. Archived from the original on 7 April 2025.
- "Joni Shanaj". Institute for Documentary Filmmakers. Archived from the original on 7 April 2025.
- ""Pharmakon", mbi dy orë mes pyllit dhe betonit". Panorama. 10 April 2012. Archived from the original on 7 April 2025.
- Grgić, Ana; Papadimitriou, Lydia, eds. (2020). Contemporary Balkan Cinema: Transnational Exchanges and Global Circuits. Edinburgh University Press. ISBN 9781474458436.
- Holdsworth, Nick (25 September 2012). "Albania to enter 'Pharmakon' for Oscars". Variety. Archived from the original on 8 December 2024.
- Rama, Majlinda (2020). "The film 'Pharmakon', a divisive spark in Albanian cinema". Telegrafi.
