= The Forgotten Mountain =

2018 film by Ardit Sadiku

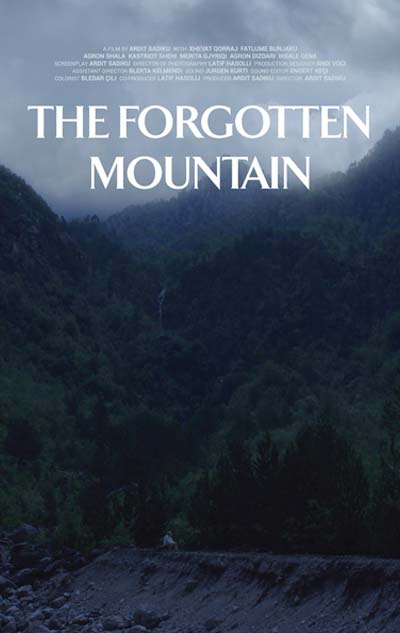
- Theatrical release poster
- Directed by: Ardit Sadiku
- Written by: Ardit Sadiku
- Starring: Xhevat Qorraj
- Cinematography: Latif Hasolli
- Music by: Orget Sadiku
- Production company: Ardit Sadiku Film
- Distributed by: Ardit Sadiku Film
- Release date: 29 November 2018
- Running time: 94 minutes
- Country: Albania
- Language: Albanian

The Forgotten Mountain (Albanian: Mali i Harrum) is a 2018 Albanian drama film directed and written by Ardit Sadiku. Xhevat Qorraj stars as a retired Albanian army colonel who finds himself suddenly defrauded of his home by his son.

== Plot ==
Rikard, after losing his property, relies on the kindness of his daughter, Ema, and her husband, Lorenc, who offer him a cabin dwelling in the ‘Accursed Mountains’. Disoriented by the foggy alpine landscape, Rikard travels deep into the mountains, along with Ema and Lorenci, in an attempt to find some peace of mind. However, in the wilderness, the trio encounter a strange man named Alban, who manages a local estate. Alban, posing as a kindly neighbor, takes a sinister personal interest in Ema and therefore starts to manipulate the family.

== Cast ==
- Xhevat Qorraj as Rikardi
- Fatlume Bunjaku as Ema
- Agron Shala as Lorenci
- Kastriot Shehi as Albani
- Merita Gjyriqi as Diella
- Agron Dizdari as Dom Gjovalini
- Igballe Qena as Marta

== Production ==
Ardit Sadiku wrote and directed The Forgotten Mountain. Latif Hasolli, who produced the film, was director of photography. Filming was done in Theth using actors from Albania and Kosovo that spoke entire in the Gheg dialect of the Albanian language. In July 2018, filming was completed.

== Release ==
The Forgotten Mountain premiered in Shkodër on 29 November 2018. It was shown at the Prishtina International Film Festival and Palić European Film Festival.

== Reception ==
The Newnan Times-Herald gave The Forgotten Mountain an 8 out of 10, praising the "skillful and purposeful" camerawork. Joshua Calladine, writing for UK Film Review, gave the film 5 stars stating that the "people on screen come close to being alive" and praised the "delicate camerawork".

== Works cited ==
=== News ===
- "Watch At Home: Echoes of Violence, American Sausage Standoff, The Forgotten Mountain". Newnan Times-Herald. 27 August 2021. Archived from the original on 3 July 2022.
- Bitel, Anton (14 April 2020). "The Forgotten Mountain (Mali i Harrum) (2018)". Projected Figures. Archived from the original on 24 April 2024.
- Calladine, Joshua (27 July 2020). "The Forgotten Mountain (Mali i Harrum) - Film Review". UK Film Review. Archived from the original on 13 April 2025.
- Shuaipi, Jolanda (16 September 2021). ""Mali i harrum" i Shqipërisë! Të flasësh për ekonominë me gjuhën e kinemasë". Koha Jonë. Archived from the original on 13 April 2025.
- Vrapi, Julia (23 November 2018). ""Mali i harrum" premierë në kinemanë e kryeqytetit, në fokus pasiguria ekonomike". KultPlus. Archived from the original on 13 April 2025.
- Vrapi, Julia (26 July 2018). ""Mali i harrum" përfundon xhirimet, një film për pasigurinë ekonomike dhe problemet shqiptare". Gazeta Sot. Archived from the original on 13 April 2025.

=== Web ===
- "Palićki festival: Život na platnu". Palić European Film Festival. 25 July 2019. Archived from the original on 30 July 2019.
- "Prifest Reveals Line-Up of the 11th Edition". Prishtina International Film Festival. 29 June 2019. Archived from the original on 12 July 2019.
