= Life Between the Waters =

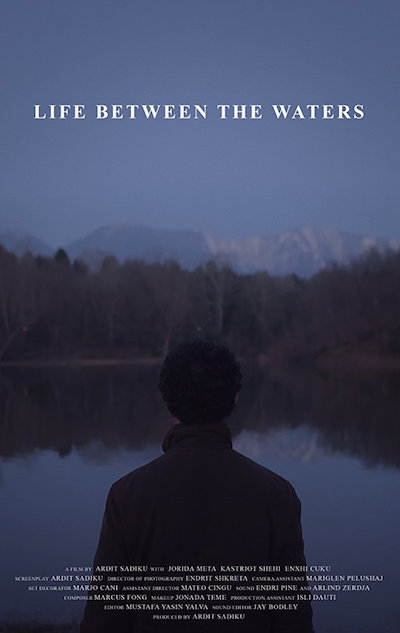
- Theatrical release poster
- Directed by: Ardit Sadiku
- Written by: Ardit Sadiku
- Starring: Jorida Meta
- Cinematography: Endrit Shkreta
- Music by: Marcus Fong
- Production company: Ardit Sadiku Film
- Distributed by: Ardit Sadiku Film
- Release date: 20 July 2017 (Albania)
- Running time: 75 minutes
- Country: Albania
- Language: Albanian

Life Between the Waters (Albanian: Jeta mes Ujërave) is a 2017 Albanian-language drama film written, directed and produced by Albanian filmmaker Ardit Sadiku, in his debut feature, starring Jorida Meta, Kastriot Shehi and Enxhi Cuku. The narrative focuses on a middle-aged, working-class married couple, whose lives unravel when their daughter suddenly disappears.

== Plot ==
A disaffected mechanic and his unemployed wife experience days of uncertainty and fear after their teenage daughter suddenly disappears. Suspecting that she has run off with a stranger from the Internet, they begin a frantic yet futile search for her, receiving only perfunctory assistance from the local police. During the search, they are forced to recognize the deep sense of alienation that has separated them from their daughter and from one another.

== Cast ==
- Jorida Meta as Drita
- Kastriot Shehi as Agimi
- Enxhi Cuku as Ermela
- Klodian Hoxha as Iliri
- Ermela Ruri as Shpresa
- Simon Shkreli as Oficeri
- Lorenc Kaja as Bujari
- Gerald Sejdini as Silvani
- Elmaz Pepa as Mario

== Production ==
Filming was done over the course of nine days. The editing was done in the United States.

== Release ==
Life Between the Waters premiered on 20 June 2017, in Tirana.

== Works cited ==
- ""Jeta midis ujërave", filmi shqiptar i xhiruar për 9 ditë (VIDEO)". Lapsi. 21 June 2017. Archived from the original on 21 April 2025.
- Vrapi, Julia (19 June 2017). "Nesër premiera e filmit "Jeta mes Ujërave", një dramë me ngjarje në Tiranë". Gazeta Sot. Archived from the original on 21 April 2025.
