= Three Sparks =

- Rotterdam release poster
- Directed by: Naomi Uman
- Written by: Naomi Uman
- Produced by: Naomi Uman
- Cinematography: Naomi Uman
- Edited by: Naomi Uman
- Music by: Naomi Uman
- Distributed by: Kino Rebelde
- Release date: February 1, 2023 (Rotterdam)
- Running time: 95 minutes
- Countries: Albania; Mexico
- Languages: English; Albanese

Three Sparks is a 2023 Albanian-Mexican documentary film written, directed, produced, filmed, scored and edited by Naomi Uman. The film shows the role of women in a small rural town in Albania.

== Synopsis ==
This three-part film explores the traditions of rural Albania and the role of women in society, all in an intimate documentary from a foreigner.

== Release ==
Three Sparks had its international premiere on February 1, 2023, as part of the Tiger Competition selection at the 52nd International Film Festival Rotterdam.

== Reception ==
=== Critical reception ===
Davide Abbatescianni from Cineuropa wrote: "All in all, this “motion-picture book” choice is fascinating, even though it may become harder and harder to follow as time passes. It also creates some distance from the subjects, who all seem to be part of the book's “illustrations”."

=== Accolades ===
Year	Award	Category	Recipient	Result	Ref.
2023	International Film Festival Rotterdam	Tiger Award	Naomi Uman	Nominated	
