= Meritas (cloth) =

19th-century brand of textiles

Meritas was a brand of oilcloth first produced in 1869 by A. F. Buchanan and Sons at Montrose, New York. The company was taken over by the Standard Soap Cloth Company which then became part of the Standard Textile Products Company. The range of cloths produced under the Meritas brand was expanded to include composite cloth, leather cloth and slate cloth which were used for a variety of purposes including upholstery and trim for automobiles. In 1909, the company built the Meritas Mills in Columbus to manufacture these cloths.
