= Robert Budina =

Albanian director producer and screenwriter

- Born: Korçë, Albania
- Education: Albanian Art Academy
- Occupations: Producer, director, writer
- Known for: Agon
- Spouse: Sabina Kodra
- Relatives: Edmond Budina (brother)

Robert Budina is an Albanian, independent film producer, director and scriptwriter.

== Biography ==
Born in Korçë, Albania, he graduated in the Academy of Arts of Tirana. Budina has also directed and written several theater plays. In 2001 he and Sabina Kodra, another Albanian film producer, founded EraFilm Production Company. Budina has also filed numerous roles as producer, executive producer, and supervisor production in various international co-productions including movies like Letters in the Wind, Balkan Bazaar and Broken by Edmond Budina, Littoral by Wajdi Mouawad, Forgiveness of Blood by Joshua Marston, Bota by Iris Elezi & Thomas Logoreci, Sworn Virgin by Laura Bispuri. Robert Budina is the brother of Albanian actor Edmond Budina.

Budina directed his first short film "Luleborë" in 2005. The film participated in many international film festivals and was given several awards such as Best Film in Algarve, Portugal and Best Male Actor in Tanger, Morocco.

Agon (film) was the first featured film of Budina. It was screened in more than 30 festivals worldwide and was awarded in some of them, such as Best Script in South East Europe Film Festival in Paris, Best Film and Best Male Actor in Bloody Hero International Film Festival in Phoenix Arizona, USA. "Agon" was selected as the Albanian entry for the Best Foreign Language Film at the 86th Academy Awards. Budina's second featured film, "A shelter among the clouds", had the world premiere in Tallinn Black Nights Film Festival in Estonia, in the Official Competition, November 2018. Consequently, the film participated in many other festivals worldwide collecting awards such as, Global Visual Award in Cinequest Film; Creativity Film Festival in San Jose, Usa, Best Film in La Valletta International Film Festival, Malta, Best Film, Best Actor, Best Actress in PriFilmFest, Kosovo, Best Music and Sound Mix in Mediterranean Film Festival Valencia, Spain. "A shelter among the clouds", is the first Albanian speaking language film distributed in German territories for more than six months, collecting around 20.000 admissions, Albania 5.000 admissions, broadcast in Digitalb Albania, Albanian National Tv RTSH and HBO. The TV series "The Square of power" written and directed by Budina in 2021 was broadcast in the biggest Albanian National TV KLAN, having an average audience tracking of 35%. Budina is currently in postproduction of his third feature film "Waterdrop".
