= Open Door (2019 film) =

2019 film

- Film poster
- Directed by: Florenc Papas
- Written by: Florenc Papas; Ajola Daja
- Produced by: Eno Milkani
- Starring: Luli Bitri; Jonida Vokshi
- Cinematography: Sevdije Kastrati
- Edited by: Stefan Stabenow
- Production companies: Bunker Film Plus; Circle Production; Lupin Film; Award Film & Video
- Release date: 19 August 2019 (Sarajevo)
- Running time: 78 minutes
- Country: Albania
- Languages: Albanian; Italian

Open Door (Albanian: Derë e hapur) is a 2019 Albanian drama road film written and directed by Florenc Papas. It was selected as the Albanian entry for the Best International Feature Film at the 93rd Academy Awards, but it was not nominated. The film debuted at the Sarajevo Film Festival on 19 August 2019, subsequently going on a festival tour that included Thessaloniki, Sofia, Luxembourg, Kolkata, Cartagena and a homecoming in Tirana.

== Plot ==
Rudina, a married middle-aged mother, is overburdened with responsibilities. In addition to working as a seamstress in a local factory, she is taking care of her old in-laws, while her demanding husband works abroad and they only see each other once a year. She is also single-handedly raising their five year old son, Orion.

Rudina is expecting her sister Elma to come back from Italy, where she lives and works, so that they can go and visit their father in their home village, on the anniversary of their mother's death. But when Elma arrives on the ferry from Bari, Rudina is shocked to see that she is pregnant. It will certainly be a problem for the old head of the family to see his unmarried daughter with a child on the way.

The two sisters, along with Orion, get on the road and come up with the idea to enlist an old friend of Elma's to pretend to be her husband during their visit.

== Cast ==
- Luli Bitri as Rudina
- Jonida Vokshi as Elma
- Sotiraq Bratko as Father
- Elidon Alikaj as Geni
- Maxwell Guzja as Orion
- Gulielm Radoja as Receptionist
- Visar Vishka as Rezart
- Jorgaq Tushe as Father-in-law
- Kastriot Shehi as Italian Boss
- Andi Begolli as Indrit
- Lutfi Hoxha as Passerby

== See also ==
- List of submissions to the 93rd Academy Awards for Best International Feature Film
- List of Albanian submissions for the Academy Award for Best International Feature Film
