= Telegrafi =

Kosovan Albanian-language news website

- Type: Daily
- Owner: Gentian Lluka (CEO)
- Staff writers: 50+ (2020)
- Founded: 25 December 2006; 19 years ago
- Language: Albanian
- Headquarters: Kosovo, Pristina
- Website: telegrafi.com

Telegrafi is an Albanian language news website published in Kosovo. It was founded on 25 December 2006.
