= Slogans (film) =

2001 film by Gjergj Xhuvani

Slogans Parullat
- Directed by: Gjergj Xhuvani
- Starring: Marko Bitraku; Mirjana Dedi; Artur Gorishti; David Elmasllari
- Release date: 31 October 2001 (France)
- Running time: 90 minutes

Slogans (Parullat) is a 2001 Albanian film directed by Gjergj Xhuvani. It was the first Albanian film to be selected to screen on the Directors' Fortnight at the 2001 Cannes Film Festival and has gone on to win many other festival awards. It was also Albania's submission to the 74th Academy Awards for the Academy Award for Best Foreign Language Film, but was not accepted as a nominee.

The film presents the ideological brainwashing that characterized the life of Albanians during the times of the communist Enver Hoxha regime. The protagonist is Andrea (Artur Gorishti; Andrea is a male name in Albania), a young and liberal-minded school teacher, who is sent from Tirana to work in a small village school. As a teacher he needs to participate in constructions of socialist and patriotic slogans on the slopes of a hill in the village. He does not take this task very seriously and for this he is continuously scorned by the village's Communist party officials.

== See also ==
- Cinema of Albania
- List of submissions to the 74th Academy Awards for Best Foreign Language Film
