= Agon (2012 film) =

2012 film by Robert Budina

- Film poster
- Directed by: Robert Budina
- Written by: Robert Budina
- Produced by: Sabina Kodra
- Starring: Eglantina Cenomeri
- Cinematography: Marius Panduru
- Edited by: Eugen Kelemen
- Music by: Aldo Shllaku
- Production companies: Erafilm; Inkas Film; Elefant Film
- Distributed by: Erafilm
- Release date: 19 October 2012 (Chicago IFF)
- Running time: 106 minutes
- Country: Albania
- Language: Albanian
- Budget: €1 million

Agon is a 2012 Albanian drama film directed and written by Robert Budina. It was Albania's nominee for the Academy Award for Best International Feature Film at the 86th Academy Awards, but it was not one of the finalists.

== Plot ==
Saimir and his younger brother Vini are Albanian immigrants living in Thessaloniki. Saimir is engaged to Elektra, a young Greek woman, and works in a workshop owned by her father, Nikos. Vini is unable to find steady employment and is dependent on Saimir. Vini meets Beni, a human trafficker associated with the mafia.

Vini joins Beni in his criminal activities and gains a large income, but tries to free one of the women, Majlinda, who is imprisoned by Keno. Keno is killed by the mafia and Vini tries to hide Majlinda in Elektra's house. A shootout breaks out in Elektra's house and Vini is killed. Saimir, who now has a son with Elektra, buries his brother.

== Cast ==
- Marvin Tafaj as Saimir
- Guliem Kotorri as Vini
- Eglantina Cenomeri as Majlinda
- Xhevdet Jashari as Keno (as Dzevdet Jasari)
- Laert Vasili as Beni (as Laertis Vasiliou)
- Antonis Kafetzopoulos as Nikos
- Isavela Kogevina as Elektra (as Isabella Kogevina)
- Hajrie Rondo as Aunt

== Production ==
Agon was produced by Albania's Erafilm, Greece's Inkas Film, France's Arizona Film, and Romania's Elefant Film. It directed by Robert Budina. Eugen Kelemen edited the film and the music was composed by Aldo Shllaku. Filming started in Thessaloniki in October 2011.

The budget was €1 million. Financing was provided by ERT1, Nova, Eurimages, Greek Film Centre, and the National Center of Cinematography.

== Release ==
Agon premiered at the Chicago International Film Festival on 18 October 2012, and Erafilm distributed the film in Albania. It was also shown at the Alexandria International Film Festival and Tirana International Film Festival.

The National Center of Cinematography selected it as Albania's nominee for the Academy Award for Best International Feature Film at the 86th Academy Awards, but it was not one of the finalists. It was the only film that met the qualifications to be nominated.

== See also ==
- List of submissions to the 86th Academy Awards for Best Foreign Language Film
- List of Albanian submissions for the Academy Award for Best Foreign Language Film

== Works cited ==
- "Agon". Erafilm. Archived from the original on 8 April 2025.
- "Agon movie to make world premiere at Chicago festival". Tirana Times. 2012. Archived from the original on 8 April 2025.
- "'Agon' officially selected as Albania's Oscar submission". Tirana Times. 2013. Archived from the original on 8 April 2025.
- Blaga, Iulia (21 March 2011). "PRODUCTION: Agon in development". Film New Europe Association. Archived from the original on 8 April 2025.
