= Gjergj Xhuvani =

Albanian film director (1963–2019)

- Born: 20 December 1963; Tirana, PR Albania
- Died: 14 August 2019 (aged 55); Rome, Italy
- Occupation: Filmmaker
- Years active: 1986–2019
- Spouse: Luiza Xhuvani (m. 1987)
- Children: 1
- Father: Dhimiter Xhuvani

Gjergj Xhuvani (20 December 1963 – 14 August 2019) was an Albanian film director, screenwriter and producer.

His 2001 film Slogans was Albania's submission to the 74th Academy Awards for the Academy Award for Best Foreign Language Film, but was not accepted as a nominee. His 2009 film East, West, East: The Final Sprint was selected as the Albanian entry for the Best Foreign Language Film at the 83rd Academy Awards, but it did not make the January shortlist.

== Death ==
Xhuvani died from complications of diabetes at age 55.
