= Central State Film Archive (Albania) =

Arkivi Qendror Shtetëror i Filmit

- Location: Tirana, Albania
- Type: Archives
- Established: 10 April 1947
- Director: Marinela Ndria
- Website: aqshf.gov.al

The Central State Film Archive (Albanian: Arkivi Qendror Shtetëror i Filmit) is the main film archive of Albania based in Tirana which lists in its repository 271 feature films, 166 animated films, 1,131 documentaries, and 1,012 film chronicles between the years 1945–2015.

== See also ==
- Lists of film archives
- Cinema of Albania
- National Center of Cinematography (Albania)
- List of Albanian films
- List of archives in Albania
