= Tirana Year Zero =

- Directed by: Fatmir Koçi
- Written by: Fatmir Koçi; Enzo Brandner; Marco Nicoletti
- Produced by: Fatmir Koçi
- Starring: Nevin Meçaj; Emilia Teli
- Cinematography: Enzo Brandner
- Edited by: Thomas Kuhne; Michel Klochendler
- Music by: Artem Denissov
- Production company: Cine-Sud Promotion
- Release date: 2001
- Running time: 89 minutes
- Countries: Albania; France; Belgium
- Language: Albanian
- Box office: $5,153

Tirana Year Zero (Tirana, année zéro), is a 2001 Albanian film produced, written and directed by Fatmir Koçi. It tells the story of a young couple in post-communist Albania, at a time when many Albanians left the country in search for a better life abroad.

== Plot ==
The protagonist of the movie is Nik, who lives in the capital of Albania, Tirana, along with his mother and father. He is in love with a beautiful girl named Klara, who wants to move to Paris to be a model. Nik makes his living with an old truck that belonged to his father, who is now sick, and seemingly dying.

Amidst the criticisms of his mother, the confusion and desperation covering the country, and the desire of his girlfriend to leave, Nik is still unsure whether he wants to leave. The film explores the way Nik handles the events of his life.

== Awards ==
The film appeared in competition at several film festivals, including Venice (2001); Sarlat, Amiens and Strasbourg; Namur, where it received the SACD prize; and Thessaloniki, where it won the first prize, the Golden Alexander.

== Cast ==
- Nevin Meçaj as Niku
- Ermela Teli as Klara
- Rajmonda Bulku as Martha
- Robert Ndrenika as Kujtim
- Lars Rudolph as Günter
- Juli Hajdini as Linda
- Laura Pelerins as Virginnie
- Behar Mera as Xhafa
- Birçe Hasko as Besim
- Nigda Dako as Dessi
- Vladimir Metani as Vladimir
- Artur Gorishti as Tare
- Gëzim Rudi as Titi
- Monika Lubonja as Nexhi
- Tea Pasko as Nexhi's daughter
- Marini as Nexhi's son
- Blegina Haskaj as Klara's sister
- Alfred Muçi as Klara's Sister's husband
- Fatos Sela as City Hall official
- Shpëtimi as drunk man 1
- Muharrem Kurti as drunk man 2
- Jorida Meta as Gipsy Girl
- Ledio Topalli as square police
- Enzo Bianchi as Paolino
- Muharrem Hoxha as barber
- Harilla Viero as Thoma
- Ardita Mullai as Barbie
- Lulzim Zeqja as maniac in train
