= East, West, East: The Final Sprint =

- Directed by: Gjergj Xhuvani
- Written by: Gjergj Xhuvani
- Starring: Shkumbin Istrefi; Nela Lucic
- Cinematography: Roberta Allegrini
- Edited by: Claudio M. Cutry
- Production companies: Albanian General Vision; Fast Rewind; ISSTRA Creative Factory
- Release date: November 14, 2009 (Thessaloniki)
- Running time: 100 minutes
- Countries: Albania; Italy
- Languages: Albanian; Italian; Slovenian; Serbian

East, West, East: The Final Sprint (Albanian: Lindje, Perëndim, Lindje) is a 2009 Albanian comedy film directed and written by Gjergj Xhuvani. The film is about an amateur cycling team from Albania that learns while on their way to France to take part in a tournament that a revolution is underway in Albania.

== Plot ==
Ilo Zoto was a competitive cyclist for twenty years, but retired from the sport. In 1990, Ilo is assigned by Albania's government to create a team of five cyclists to represent the country in a race in France. On their way to France they go to Trieste, where they see a revolution break out in Albania. They are unable to contact anybody in Albania and their remaining funds will only allow them to ride their bicycles to France.

== Cast ==
- Ndricim Xhepa as Ilo Zoto
- Helidon Fino as Gimi
- Fation Pustina as Ceti
- Ervin Bejleri
- Gentian Hazizi
- Lulzim Zeqja
- Romir Zalla

== Production ==
An Albanian and Italian coproduction, East, West, East: The Final Sprint was produced by Albanian General Vision, Fast Rewind, and ISSTRA Creative Factory. Gjergj Xhuvani directed and wrote the film. The cinematography was done by Roberta Allegrini and it was edited by Claudio M. Cutry. 35 mm colour film was used for filming. Financial support was provided by the National Center of Cinematography.

== Release ==
High Point Films acquired the international distribution rights for the film. The National Center of Cinematography selected it as Albania's nominee for the Academy Award for Best International Feature Film at the 83rd Academy Awards, but it was not one of the finalists.

== Reception ==
Nick Holdsworth, writing for Variety, praised the performances of the film's ensemble cast.

== Awards ==
Gjergj Xhuvani won the Best Director award at the Tirana Film Festival.

== See also ==
- List of submissions to the 83rd Academy Awards for Best Foreign Language Film
- List of Albanian submissions for the Academy Award for Best Foreign Language Film

== Works cited ==
- "East West East". Thessaloniki International Film Festival. Archived from the original on 7 April 2025.
- "East, West, East: The Final Sprint". Cineuropa. Archived from the original on 7 April 2025.
- Blaney, Martin (1 June 2010). "EFP adds Alabanian National Center of Cinematography". Screen Daily. Archived from the original on 7 April 2025.
- Hazelton, John (13 October 2010). "65 submissions for foreign language Oscar". Screen Daily. Archived from the original on 7 April 2025.
- Holdsworth, Nick (27 September 2010). "Albania looks 'East' for its Oscar choice". Variety. Archived from the original on 7 April 2025.
- Ward, Audrey (17 October 2008). "High Point Films takes rights to East, West, East - The Final Sprint". Screen Daily. Archived from the original on 7 April 2025.
