= Tirana International Film Festival =

Annual film festival in Tirana, Albania

- Festival logo
- Location: Tirana, Albania
- Founded: 2003
- Language: International
- Website: tiranafilmfest.org

The Tirana International Film Festival (TIFF; Albanian: Festivali Ndërkombëtar i Filmit në Tiranë) is an Academy Awards qualifying film festival and one of the major annual events taking place in Tirana each year. It was the first international cinema festival in Albania. This cultural event was created in 2003 and is currently the most important cinematic event in Albania.

The Festival is competitive with the International Section jury awarding several prizes each year, most notably the "Golden Owl" for Best Feature Film.

It is organised annually by the Albanian National Center of Cinematography. It features three distinct categories and combines features and short film; fiction, documentary, animation and experimental. The festival is open to any filmmaker from around the world and it also accepts student works.

== History ==
The festival was held for the first time in 2003. Since then it has been held annually in the cinemas of Tirana. During the 12th edition more than 5,400 applications were submitted.

In 2015, the Festival introduced DocuTIFF (Documentary Tirana International Film Festival), after large applications sent during the 12th edition of the Festival held in 2014. It was impossible to show all these production in one single festival and new festivals were created for each category such as DocuTIFF, for documentary film, AnimaTIFF, for animated productions and ExpoTIFF for experimental films.

== Award winners ==
The list of the Winners of the Golden Owl award for each year is as follows:

Year	English title	Original title	Director(s)	Country
2003	The Last Gunman	The Last Gunman	Alessandro Dominici	Italy
2004	Family Portrait		Ellery Ngiam	Singapore
2005	Before I Go		Heiko Hahn	Germany
2006	The Optimists	Оптимисти	Goran Paskaljević	Serbia
2007	Salvador	Salvador	Manuel Huerga	Spain
2008	Annem Sinema Ögreniyor	Annem Sinema Ögreniyor	Nesimi Yetik	Germany
2009	Woman without a piano	La mujer sin Piano	Javier Rebollo	Spain
2010	Woman in temptation	Ženy v pokušení	Jiří Vejdělek	Czech Republic
2011	Punk's not dead	Punk's not dead	Vladimir Blazevski	North Macedonia
2012	Siberia, Monamour	Sibir. Monamur	Slava Ross	Russia
2013	Seven Lucky Gods	Seven Lucky Gods	Jamil Dehlavi	United Kingdom
2014	Termitaria	Nuwebe	Joseph Israel Laban	Philippines
2015	Babai	Babai	Visar Morina	Kosovo
2016	Hear the Silence	Höre die Stille	Ed Ehrenberg	Germany
2017	Glory	Слава	Kristina Grozeva, Petar Valchanov	Bulgaria
2018	Irina	Ирина	Nadejda Koseva	Bulgaria

== See also ==
- International Film Summerfest of Durrës
