= Gazeta Sot =

Daily newspaper published in Albania

Gazeta SOT
- Type: Daily newspaper
- Format: Berliner
- Owner(s): Arjan Prodani
- Publisher: Arjan Prodani
- Editor-in-chief: Kliti Topalli
- Founded: October 26, 2002
- Headquarters: Tirana, Albania
- Country: Albania
- Website: sot.com.al

Gazeta SOT is a daily newspaper published in Albania.

Reporters Without Borders describes Gazeta Sot as a daily newspaper established in 2002.
