= Alive (2009 film) =

2009 Albanian drama film

- Directed by: Artan Minarolli
- Written by: Artan Minarolli
- Produced by: Marie Balducchi; Dritan Huqi; Vincent Lucassen; Artan Minarolli; Ebba Sinzinger
- Starring: Nik Xhelilaj; Xhevdet Ferri; Bruno Shllaku; Besart Kallaku; Luli Bitri
- Cinematography: Jacques Bouquin
- Edited by: Oliver Neumann
- Production companies: Agat Films & Cie; Art Film; Wildart Film
- Release date: July 5, 2009 (Czech Republic)
- Running time: 90 minutes
- Countries: Albania; Austria; France
- Language: Albanian
- Box office: $5,688

Alive (Albanian: Gjallë), stylized as Alive!, is a 2009 drama film directed and written by Artan Minarolli. It stars Nik Xhelilaj in the 1997 tragedy of Otranto, in which at least 84 Albanians died while attempting to emigrate to Italy by ship. It was Albania's nominee for the Academy Award for Best International Feature Film at the 82nd Academy Awards, but it was not one of the finalists.

== Plot ==
In a country where tradition and modernity are in constant conflict, Koli, a college student determined to fully embrace his youth, finds his life upended when his father passes away. Tasked with bearing the burden of an ancient crime, Koli is drawn into the brutal and archaic realities of contemporary Albania's feudal past.

== Cast ==
- Nik Xhelilaj as Koli
- Xhevdet Ferri as Zefi
- Bruno Shllaku as Roku
- Besart Kallaku as Fikja
- Luli Bitri as the pool girl
- Romir Zalla as Tiku
- Reshat Arbana as the godfather
- Arqile Lici as the mediator
- Eni Cani as Fatime
- Tinka Kurti as Fatime's grandmother
- Gentian Zenelaj as Fatime's brother
- Julian Deda as Fatime's brother
- Ermal Mamaqi as Fatime's brother

== Production ==
Alive was an Albanian, Austrian, and French coproduction by WILDart Film, Agat Films & Cie – Ex Nihilo, and Art Film. Artan Minarolli wrote and directed the film. Oliver Neumann edited the film, the cinematography was done by Jacques Bouquin, and Baptiste Bouquin composed the music.

Filming was done in Tirana, Baldushk, Lurë, Shkodër, and Durrës during 2008. Financial support was provided by the Österreichisches Filminstitut. Only one scene was not filmed in Albania and was shot in Vienna as the scene required underwater effects.

== Release ==
Alive premiered at the Karlovy Vary International Film Festival on 4 July 2009. It was distributed in Austria by ThimFilm, where it earned $5,688. Albania selected the film as its nominee for the Academy Award for Best International Feature Film at the 82nd Academy Awards, but it was not one of the finalists.

== Works cited ==
=== News ===
- ""Alive!" Represents Albania in Hollywood". Telegrafi. 2009. Archived from the original on 11 April 2025.
- Prot, Bénédicte (18 November 2009). "Cottbus chooses extra-Ordinary prize-winner". Cineuropa. Archived from the original on 11 April 2025.
- Ruci, Ani (2 January 2010). "The film "Alive" - the fate of the individual in post-totalitarian societies". DW News. Archived from the original on 18 August 2024.
- Van Joeij, Boyd (20 July 2009). "Alive!". Variety. Archived from the original on 11 April 2025.

=== Web ===
- "Alive!". Box Office Mojo.
- "Alive!". Austrian Film Institute. Archived from the original on 11 April 2025.
- "Alive!". Karlovy Vary International Film Festival. Archived from the original on 11 April 2025.
- "Alive!". Cineuropa. Archived from the original on 11 April 2025.
