= Prishtina International Film Festival =

Annual film festival held in Pristina, Kosovo

Prishtina International Film Festival- Prifest
- Location: Pristina, Kosovo
- Founded: 2009
- Awards: Golden Goddess
- Language: International

The Prishtina International Film Festival, also known as the Pristina Film Festival and PriFilmFest, is a film festival held annually in Pristina, Kosovo, that screens prominent international cinema productions in the Balkan region and beyond, and draws attention to the Kosovar film industry. It was created after the 2008 Kosovo declaration of independence. The first festival was held in 2009, and featured actress Vanessa Redgrave as the host. In 2015, the festival was cancelled due to a cut in funding by the Ministry of Culture of Kosovo. The 7th edition of the festival, which was scheduled to take place from 24 April to 1 May, was thus instead held in Tirana, Albania on 24 and 25 April and renamed to "PriFest in Exile".

== History ==
After its independence in 2008, Kosovo looked for ways to promote its cultural and artistic image. Vjosa Berisha "designed a project on promoting Kosovo internationally and build a better image for Kosovo." The project became PriFilmFest; Berisha served as an artistic director. The organizers submitted a proposal for the festival for June 2009, with actress Vanessa Redgrave serving as the chairman of the board. It was rescheduled to September. As of October 2009, it has become one of five active Kosovar film festivals that have emerged from 2002.

PriFilmFest posted that its mission was "to open doors of the newest country in the world, Kosovo, to welcome different cultures of the world through cinema, using it as a medium to promote open dialog between cultures and nations." It brought in international directors and producers, and promotes Kosovar films. Its organizers have stated that Kosovo should not be known solely for political events, but for its culture. Berisha stated that PriFilmFest was inspired by the Sarajevo Film Festival, which had "branded the city internationally."

As part of the event, the winners would each receive a statue called the Golden Goddess, which was based on "Goddess of the throne", a terracotta figure from the Neolithic period that was discovered in Kosovo in 1960, and had become the city's symbol.

The PriFilmFest founders are: Vjosa Berisha, Orhan Kerkezi, Fatos Berisha, and Faton Hasimja.

== PriFilm Forum ==
Starting with the second edition in 2010, the PriFilmFest launched a co-production group called PriFilm Forum. It consisted of seminars, workshops, and discussions designed to connect Kosovar filmmakers with those in neighboring countries. The two-day workshop in 2010 brought together filmmakers from Kosovo, Albania, Macedonia, Montenegro and Serbia; they listened to presentations from co-production professionals, including EAVE (European Audio-Visual Entrepreneurs), Medienboard (German Film Fund), and Robert Bosch Stiftung. Producers and filmmakers from Bosnia, Croatia and Bulgaria shared their experiences.

== PriFilmFest 2009 ==
The first edition ran from 22 to 30 September 2009. The slogan for the first edition was "The beginning...", which referenced Humphrey Bogart's Casablanca quote: "This is the beginning of a beautiful friendship." Actress Vanessa Redgrave, who had worked on many charitable causes in Kosovo, hosted the event. Berisha stated that Kosovo was trying to host events that shift media attention from politics, and that the movies in the competition include entries from the Balkans, Germany, UK and Afghanistan. The show opened with the world premiere of Gjergj Xhuvani's East, West, East: The Final Sprint. The event included both competition and non-competition films. Six awards were presented. The event only screened one Kosovar film: Across the Road by Yll Citaku. However, the film was not qualified for the competition section, because it had been filmed in digital camera format. The festival also fostered discussion among the filmmakers and the audience on how to help filmmaking in Kosovo.

=== Jury ===
The following people served as the jurors for the festival.

- Isa Qosja, film director. President of the jury.
- Marcel Maiga, festival organizer.
- David Gothard, director.
- Mira Staleva, deputy director of Sofia IFF.
- Saimir Kumbaro, director.

=== Awards ===
Source: PriFilmFest website and Southeast Europe website.

| Award | Film | Person |
|---|---|---|
| Best Film | Snow | Aida Begić (Bosnia and Herzegovina) |
| Best Director | Opium War | director: Siddiq Barmak (Afghanistan) |
| Best Actor | The Living and the Dead | unknown (Note: The PriFilmFest website listed "The crew of actors" as the best actor.) |
| Best Actress | I am from Titov Veles | Labina Mitevska |
| Special Jury Prize | East, West, East: The Final Sprint | Gjergj Xhuvani (Albania) |
| Jury's Special Mention for the Best Film | I am from Titov Veles | -- |
| Audience Prize | Time of the Comet | director: Fatmir Koçi (Albania) |

== PriFilmFest 2010 ==
The second edition ran from 22 to 29 September 2010. Italian actor Franco Nero attended. Eva Orner, who won an Oscar for the documentary Taxi to the Dark Side, opened the event, and chaired the jury. The festival included special screenings of Samuel Maoz's Lebanon, Roman Polanski's The Ghost Writer, Franco Nero's Angelus Hiroshimae, Goran Paskaljević's Honeymoons (Medeni mesec), and Jan Verheyen's Dossier K. Ten medium-length films were also presented. The Italian Embassy presented The Italian Retrospective which included five films from director Gianni Amelio.

The slogan for the festival was changed to "Friendship continues..."

=== Awards ===
| Award | Film | Person |
|---|---|---|
| Best Film | On the Path (Na putu) (Bosnia and Herzegovina) (Note: Actress Jasmila Zbanic and Actor/Co-Producer Leon Lucev accepted the award.) | -- |
| Best Directing | Tehroun (Teheran) (Iran) (France) | Nader T. Homavoun |
| Best Actor (Note: The Bekim Fehmiu Award for Best Actor is given by Kosovo's Ministry of Culture.) | The Albanian | Nik Xhelilaj |
| Best Actress | On the Path (Na putu) | Zrinka Cvitešić (Croatia) |
| Special Acknowledgements by the Jury | Alive (Gjalle); If I Want to Whistle, I Whistle | Artan Minarolli; Florin Şerban (Romania) |
| Media Award | War is over (North Macedonia) (Switzerland) | Mitko Panov |
| Audience Award | Border Donkeys (Gomaret e Kufirit) (Kosovo) | director: Jeton Ahmetaj |
| Special Award of the Jury | The Albanian (Albania) (Germany) | director: Johannes Naber |

== PriFilmFest 2011 ==
The third edition of the festival was held from 24 September to 1 October 2011. It opened with The Forgiveness of Blood, a film by American director Joshua Marston, and finished at the Square 21 with a red carpet gala. The president of the jury was Gedeon Burkhard (Inglourious Basterds), who had also submitted a medium-length film called Bridges.

The slogan for the third edition was changed to "Friendship. Forever."

The second edition of PriFilm Forum was held on 25 and 26 September, connecting worldwide directors and producers with those in Kosovo. Presenters included Sarah Calderon (Karma Films), Satu Elo (EAVE), Bernd Buder (Berlin International Film Festival), Roshanak Behesht Nedjad (Flying Moon), David Grumbach (French filmmaker), and Elma Tataragic (Program Selector, Sarajevo Film Festival).

=== Awards ===
Source: PriFilmFest website.

| Award | Film | Person |
|---|---|---|
| Best Film | Loverboy (Romania) | director: Cătălin Mitulescu |
| Special Jury Prize | Punk's Not Dead | director: Vladimir Blazevski (North Macedonia) |
| Best Director | Shelter | Dragomir Sholey |
| Best Actor | Loverboy | George Piştereanu (Note: Piştereanu was 21 years old when he starred in Loverboy, and it was his second film.) |
| Best Actress | Amnesty | Luli Bitri |
| Silver Goddess – Best Film in Middle-Length Category | Daddy | director: Umut Dag (Austria) |
| Special Jury mention | Room 304 (Denmark) | director: Birgitte Stærmose |
| Audience Award | Amnesty (Albania) | director: Bujar Alimani |
| Media jury award – Best Film | Our Grand Despair | director: Seyfi Teoman (Turkey) |

== PriFest 2012 ==
The fourth edition was held from 24 September to 1 October 2012.

=== Jury ===
The jury for the fourth edition were divided into four groups:

- Competition Program Jury: Daniela Weber, David Gothard and Blerta Zeqiri
- Honey & Blood Program Jury: David Gant, Sylvia Stevens and Barbara Lorey de Lacharierre
- Middle-Length Program Jury: Alban Ukaj, Nikola Ljuca and Igor A. Nola
- Media Jury: Arbana Osmani, Kushtrim Sudiku and Adriane Pajaziti

=== Awards ===
Source: PriFest website.

| Award | Film | Person |
|---|---|---|
| Best Film | Three Worlds (France) | director: Catherine Corsini |
| Special Jury Prize | Avé (Bulgaria) | director: Konstantin Bojanov |
| Best Director | tie: Kuma; Just the wind | tie: Umut Dag (Austria); Bence Fliegauf (Hungary) |
| Best Actor | The Repentant | Nabil Asli (Algeria) |
| Best Actress | Three Worlds | Arta Dobroshi (Kosovo) |
| Special Jury Mention | The House (Slovakia) | Zuzana Liová |
| Red Goddess – Balkan film category Honey and Blood | Parade | Srđan Dragojević |
| Silver Goddess – Middle Length Program | Vast (Netherlands) | director: Rolf van Ejik |
| Media Award (Note: The Media Award for 2012 was awarded by the Dritan Hoxha Foundation) | Three Worlds | director: Catherine Corsini |
| Audience Award | Agnus Dei (Kosovo) | Agim Sopi |
