= Esmeralda Metka =

Albanian comedian and actor (born 1987)

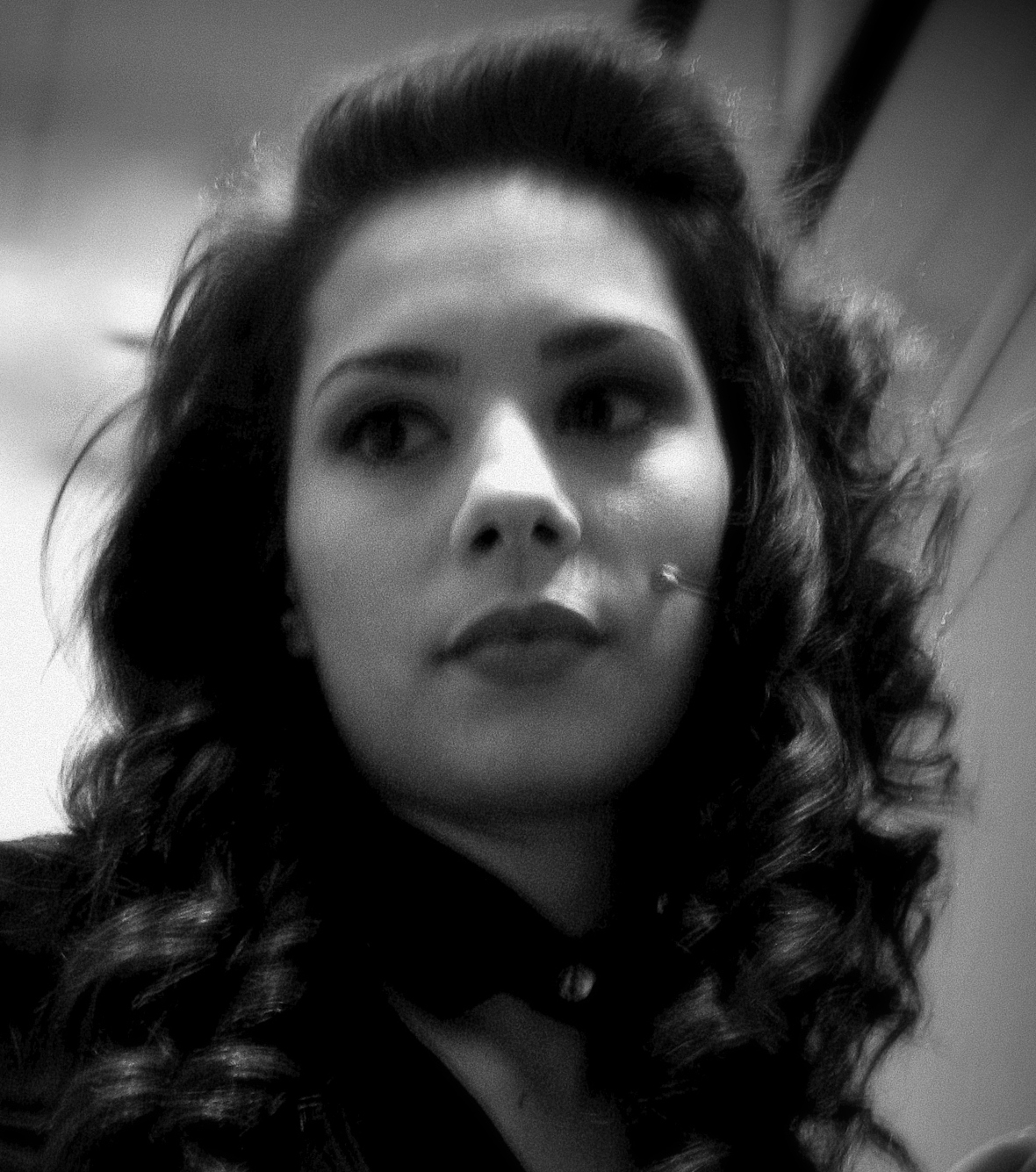
- Metka in November 2013
- Born: Tepelenë, Albania
- Other names: Cubi
- Citizenship: Albania
- Occupations: Actress, comedian, voice actress
- Years active: c. 2009–present
- Notable work: Apartamenti 2XL (2010s–2018); Klanifornia (2019–2023); Portokalli (2024–present)

Esmeralda Metka, known professionally as Cubi, is an Albanian television actress and comedian. She is known for her work in Albanian television comedy, particularly for performing in sketch shows such as Apartamenti 2XL, Klanifornia and Portokalli.

== Early life and education ==
Esmeralda Metka was born in Tepelenë. She completed primary and middle school at Avni Rustemi in Tepelenë, and later pursued formal training in the arts at the Academy of Arts in Tirana, where she studied performance and voice acting.

== Career ==
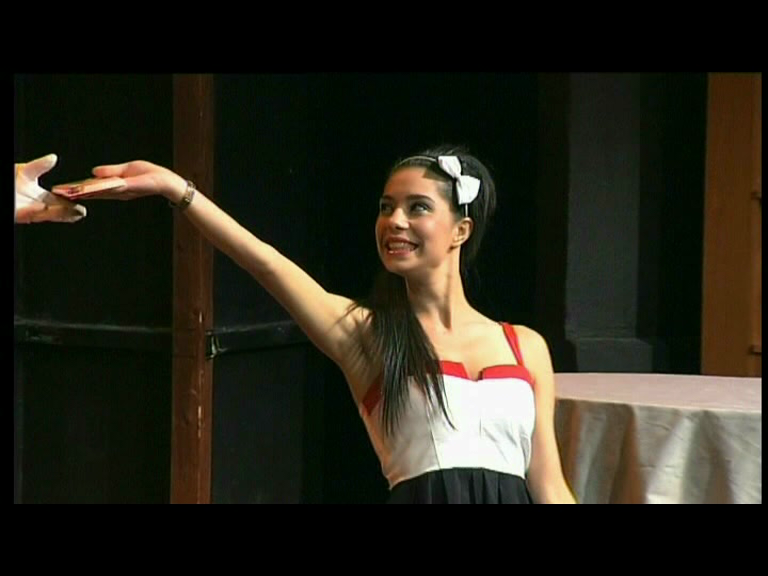
Metka in 2013

Metka rose to prominence as a comedic performer on the television comedy series Apartamenti 2XL around the 2010s, where she appeared in various sketches and ensemble performances.

Following this, she appeared in television work associated with the same comedy troupe, including the show Duplex, where she responded publicly to questions about her involvement and confirmed her role within the cast, but she left in August 2018, 2 months before the show started. Metka became a regular cast member of the comedy show Klanifornia, broadcast on TV Klan, hence the name Klanifornia, where she has appeared in sketches alongside other actors and shared her views on working with her colleagues.

In a 2021 interview, Metka explained that she stepped back from television for health reasons before returning to screen work after recovering. In October 2024, she came back to acting in Television, joining Portokalli.

== Television ==
Year(s)	Title
2010s–2018	Apartamenti 2XL
2019–2023	Klanifornia
c. 2024–present	Portokalli

== Personal life ==
Metka has explained the origin of her nickname “Cubi”, stating that it was given to her in childhood by family members and later became widely used by audiences. In media appearances, she has discussed personal challenges, including a period of serious health issues that affected her emotionally and professionally.

In interviews about her personal life, Metka has been candid about being in love but has kept further details private, sometimes addressing public speculation with humor.
