= Vjosa (disambiguation) =

The Vjosa is a river in Greece and Albania.

Vjosa may also refer to:

- KF Vjosa, Kosovo football club
- Vjosa Berisha (1972–2022), businessperson
- Vjosa Osmani (born 1982), Kosovar politician
