= Agon Channel =

Albanian television channel

Coordinates: 41°19′23.28″N 19°49′18.94″E

- Për një ditë të mbarë, shikoni Agon; Per una buona giornata, guarda Agon
- Country: Albania
- Affiliates: Television, online and livestream
- Headquarters: Tirana, Albania

Programming
- Language: Albanian
- Picture format: 576i (SDTV 16:9); 1080i (HDTV 16:9)

Ownership
- Owner: Francesco Becchetti Communications
- Sister channels: Agon Channel Italia

History
- Launched: 5 April 2013 (Albania)
- Founder: Francesco Becchetti

Agon Channel was a private television station from Tirana, Albania, launched on 5 April 2013 by Italian businessman Francesco Becchetti. The Italian version of Agon Channel was launched on 1 December 2014 on the Italian digital terrestrial television network with channel slot 33, as a sister channel of the Albanian Agon Channel. Agon was available in two languages; Albanian and Italian. Italian celebrities such as Simona Ventura, Pupo, Maddalena Corvaglia and Sabrina Ferilli were associated with the station along with Albanian personalities such as Sonila Meço from Vizion Plus, Adi Krasta and Saimir Kodra from Top Channel, Gentian Zenelaj, Mimoza Picari and Menada Zaimi.

Agon Channel shut down on 10 October 2015. Francesco Becchetti, the owner of the channel and his mother, Liliana Condomitti were accused and wanted for money laundering. Francesco Becchetti's assets were frozen, and Agon Channel was unable to continue which led to the channel's shutdown.

== Programs ==
| Program | Category | Host(s) | Hour and day of transmission |
|---|---|---|---|
| FreePass | Reality | Bledi Strakosha, Qetsor Ferunaj, Armela | Unknown |
| Star System | Showbiz | Bledi Strakosha | Unknown |
| Të Parët | Morning Show | Artion Vreto, Qetësor Ferunaj | Mondays – Fridays 07:30 |
| Kontrata | Politics | Sonila Meço, Barbara D'Urso | Wednesdays, 21:00 |
| Rrethuar | Interviewing | Sonila Meço, Mimoza Picari, Menada Zaimi | Saturdays, 20:30 |
| Antilope | Investigative | Artion Vreto, Qetësor Freunaj, Eva Murati | Tuesdays, 21:30 |
| Watching | Politics | Menada Zaimi | Tuesdays – Thursdays, 21:00 |
| A Krasta Show | Talk Show | Adi Krasta | Thursdays, 21:30 |
| Hit Play | Entertainment | Anjeza Maja | Fridays, 22:40 |
| Ça thu? | Satiro-Investigative | Saimir Kodra, Gentian Zenelaj | Mondays – Fridays 20:30 |
| Veni Vidi Vinci | Talk Show | Alessio Vinci | Mondays, 21:00 |
| Duartrokitje | Talk Show | Adi Krasta, Aferdrita Dreshaj, Kledi Kadiu | Saturdays, 21:00 |
| Dita e Shtatë | Weekend Show | Anjeza Maja, Xhesika Berberi, Artion Vreto, Sonila Meço, Gentian Zenelaj, Saimir Kodra, Giancarlo Padovan | Sundays, 14:30 |
| Harta Ime | Discovery Show | Andi Bica | Unknown |
| Dicendum | "Docu-city" Show | Ervin Kotori | Unknown |
| Kaliber '99 | Game Show | Arjon Muça | Mondays to Fridays, 14:00 |
| Surpriza je ti! | Talent | Two hosts, names unknown | Sundays, time unknown |
| Agon Land | Showbiz | DEE JAY TONI | Unknown |
| Amerikani – I pari në Lajme! | Talent/Reality | Alessio Vinci, Sonila Meco, Saimir Kodra, Artion Vreto | Unknown |
