= Saimir Kodra =

Albanian journalist and television presenter (born 1974)

- Born: 20 August 1995 (age 31); Tirana, Albania
- Occupations: Journalist; television presenter; voice actor
- Years active: 2000s–present
- Spouse: Ada Kasneci (m. 2014)
- Children: 1

Saimir Kodra (born 20 August 1995) is an Albanian journalist, television presenter and former voice actor. He has hosted the investigative television program Fiks Fare on Top Channel and later Stop on TV Klan.

== Early life and voice acting ==
Kodra was born in Tirana, Albania. His voice has been used for the Albanian dubbing of several animated characters, including Lumière in Beauty and the Beast, Mushu in Mulan, Jiminy Cricket and the Lamp in Pinocchio, Governor Ratcliffe in Pocahontas, Donkey in Shrek, the Monkey in Shrek Forever After, the Huntsman in Snow White and the Seven Dwarfs, and Timon in The Lion King.

== Television career ==
Kodra worked as a host on the satirical and investigative program Fiks Fare on Top Channel with Gent Pjetri until 2013. After leaving, he joined Agon Channel, hosting an investigative format titled Ça thu? with Gentian Zenelaj until the channel closed. He later moved to TV Klan, where he co-hosted the investigative program Stop.

== Political activity ==
In 2007 Kodra ran as a civil society candidate supported by the opposition in partial elections in Pogradec but lost to the candidate Eris Hoxha.

== Personal life ==
He is married to journalist Ada Kasneci, and they have one son, Aleksandër.
