= Albano Bogdo =

Albanian comedian and actor (born 1987)

- Born: 11 April 1987 (age 38); Sarandë, PSR Albania
- Education: Academy of Arts
- Occupations: Actor, comedian
- Years active: 2010–present
- Height: 1.86 m (6 ft 1 in)

Albano Bogdo (born 11 April 1987) is an Albanian comedian and actor, best known for his performances in the comedy shows Apartamenti 2XL, Duplex, and Klanifornia. In 2023, he was the host of his own show, Albano Show. In 2024 he hosted the "2984" show . Currently he is the co-host of "Fake Off" alongside Agron Llaka in Vizion Plus TV.

== Television career ==
In addition to his roles in comedy shows, Bogdo has also participated in reality television. A former contestant on the first edition of Ferma VIP, he returned for the second season in a different role, serving as the headman of the farm.
