= Qesh Mirë... Kush Qesh i Fundit =

- Genre: Comedy; Reality
- Directed by: Salsano Rrapi
- Presented by: Salsano Rrapi; Xhemi Shehu
- Country of origin: Albania
- Original language: Albanian
- No. of seasons: 1
- No. of episodes: 8

Production
- Executive producer: Altin Basha
- Camera setup: Multi-camera
- Running time: 60 minutes

Original release
- Network: Top Channel
- Release: 8 March – 26 April 2022

Related
- Documental

Qesh Mirë... Kush Qesh i Fundit (transl. He Who Laughs Last... Laughs Best) is an Albanian comedy reality television show based on the format of Japanese comedian Hitoshi Matsumoto's Documental. The first season premiered on 8 March 2022 on Top Channel, hosted by Salsano Rrapi and Xhemi Shehu. Several famous Albanian celebrities have to make laugh each other, but themselves should not laugh.

== Format ==
In each season, ten famous artists have fourteen hours to laugh at each other in a house equipped with all the facilities, with different programs, and remove them from the game, without laughing themselves.

The general space of the room where the participants are present and where the competition is held, has a design similar to the home space and has a living room and a kitchen. There is also an accessory and makeup room next to the participants' room. Participants go to this room whenever they want during the game and bring a tool from there or make a change in their appearance so that they can make others laugh with it.

Everyone should laugh at others during the match and not laugh at the same time. Each participant who laughs receives a yellow card the first time and is fined a second time with a red card and expelled from the room.

Each participant also has a special opportunity of laughing on a limited time that he can use whenever he wants. In this opportunity, others must pay full attention to him and are not allowed to do anything else, and during this time, the person performs a special performance to make others laugh.

Participants use different methods to make others laugh and perform different types of comedy. These include: comedy performances, characterization and typography, verbal jokes, comic music performances, stand-up comedy performances, the use of various accessories and tools such as dolls and funny costumes, parodying famous works, physical comedy, and so on.

Also, from time to time, a guest enters the contest to be able to make the participants laugh by performing stand-up comedy, telling jokes, playing a game, and so on.

The program has two hosts who also acts as the referee of the match. They have a separate room with a space similar to a monitoring room, where they sit during the race and monitors the participants. Whenever the hosts see one of the participants laughing from their room monitors, they stop the game with the red button in front of them. One of them then goes to the playroom and fines the offending participant by showing a slow laughter scene. After that, the host returns to their room and announces the continuation of the match with the green button.

Each participant who receives a red card and is eliminated from the competition, comes to the host room and watches the continuation of the competition with him. After 7 hours one celebrity that have been eliminated, can return in the show. With the elimination of the participants, the last person to stay in the room wins the contest and wins the statuette and the grand prize.

== Filming ==
The show was filmed in the Top Channel studio, with the name Studio Nova. The house is the same house was used in the Albanian version of Big Brother VIP, but with some changes. The garden, the bedroom and the bathroom were closed, but the rest of the house was open.

== Participants ==
Celebrity	Episode entered	Episode exited	Status
Besmir Bitraku	1	7	Winner
Marin Orhanasi	1	7	Winner
Bujar Asqeriu	1	6	Evicted
Valina Mucolli	1; 4	3; 5	Evicted
Ylber Bardhi	1	5	Evicted
Ermal Mamaqi	1; 4	1; 5	Evicted
Zamira Kita	1	5	Evicted
Olta Daku	1; 4	3; 4	Evicted
Genc Fuga	1	3	Evicted
Arben Derhemi	1	2	Evicted

== Elimination table ==
W The competitor wins the game
S The competitor has not undergone any action and is still safe
A The competitor is warned but continues the game
E The competitor is expelled and exits the game
E The competitor is warned and expelled in the same episode

Position	Competitor	Episode							
Position	Competitor	1	2	3	4	5	6	7	Reunion
1	Besmir	S	S	S	S	S	S	W (Note: Finished the 14-hour period unable to make each other be expelled, and shared the prize.)	Guest
1	Marin	S	A	S	S	S	A	W	Guest
3	Bujar	S	S	S	S	S	E		
4	Valina	S	S	E	A	E			Guest
5	Ylber	S	S	A	S	E			Guest
6	Ermal	E			A	E			Guest
7	Zamira	S	S	A	A	E			Guest
8	Olta	S	A	E	E				Guest
9	Genc	S	S	E					Guest
10	Arben	A	E						Guest
