= Julian Deda =

Albanian comedian and actor (born 1981)

- Born: 15 September 1981 (age 44); Shkodër, PSR Albania
- Education: Academy of Arts in Tirana
- Spouse: Armanda Duma Deda
- Children: 2
- Parent(s): Zef Deda; Rozi Deda

Comedy career
- Years active: 2003–present
- Genres: Observational comedy, Physical comedy, Improvisational comedy, Character comedy

Julian "Jul" Deda (born 15 September 1981) is an Albanian comedian and actor. He is known for his role on the Albanian live television non-scripted sitcom Apartment 2XL. He has also appeared in the sketch comedy show Portokalli. He was the co-host of the satirical television program Fiks Fare, along with Xhemi Shehu on Top Channel until September 2026.

== Career ==
=== Early life and television ===
Due to the political and economic turmoil in Albania during the early 1990s, Deda emigrated with his family to Germany, returning in 1996. Following his studies at the Academy of Arts, he began working in television in the early 2000s, initially appearing on the comedy show Portokalli. He later joined the cast of Apartamenti 2XL, an unscripted comedy format that ran for several seasons. Following that, he appeared on the humor program Duplex and began

=== Film ===
He has acted in various films, including Alive (2009), Der Albaner (2010), and I Love Tropoja (2020).

=== Reality television ===
In 2024–2025, Deda participated in the third season of Big Brother VIP Albania. He was the runner up of that season.

== Personal life ==
Julian Deda is married to Armanda Duma Deda, the couple have two children. He is also the son of actor Zef Deda, who died in 2023. Deda has publicly expressed the influence his father had on his career.

== Filmography ==
Year	Title	Character	Notes
2009	Alive	Fatime's brother	Big screen debut
2010	Der Albaner	Florenci	
2011	The Key Issue	Mr. Gigi	
2014	Simon	Simoni	
2020	I Love Tropoja	Valbona's brother	
