= Stop (Albanian TV program) =

Albanian satirical-investigative TV show (since 2015)

- Genre: Satirical-investigative
- Presented by: Saimir Kodra; Gentian "Gent" Zenelaj
- Country of origin: Albania
- Original language: Albanian

Production
- Running time: 50 minutes

Original release
- Network: TV Klan
- Release: 2015 – present

Stop is an Albanian satirical-investigative television program hosted by Saimir Kodra and Gentian Zenelaj. The show airs on the national channel TV Klan and reports on society issues, public concerns, and perceived negative phenomens in Albania.

The program presents a combination of satire and investigative reporting. It has used hidden cameras and field reports to examine issues such as administrative failures, corruption, and other societal concerns.

Stop began broadcasting in 2015. Since its debut, the program has covered a range of social issues in Albania.
