= Blerim Destani =

Albanian actor and producer

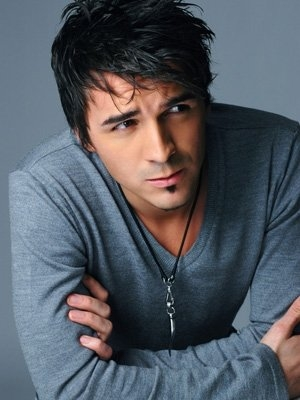
- Born: 12 April 1981 (age 43); West Germany
- Occupation(s): Actor, producer
- Years active: 1996–present

Blerim Destani is an Albanian actor and producer. He is best known for his roles in Time of the Comet and Dossier K.

== Biography ==
Destani was born in Stolberg near Aachen, West Germany. He spent his childhood in Tetovo, North Macedonia. His family is Albanian. Destani has lived and worked in Germany and North Macedonia for the last ten years.

== Career ==
At 14 years of age, Destani made his acting debut in the Albanian TV film Atje ku nuk lind dielli (Where the sun doesn't rise). While producing short documentaries, he began taking acting classes in England.

In 2004, Destani was offered his first major role in a film. He attracted significant public attention in Southeast Europe by playing the part of the main character "Beni" in the Kosovar TV production Metropolet (director: Sunaj Raca). The successful cooperation with the well-known director Sunaj Raca was continued in 2005 in the motion picture Kosova - Desperate Search. The film recounts the repercussions and effects of the Kosovar war on the Albanian population.

Destani has also directed and produced films. He was the associate producer of the Macedonian cinema production The Great Water (directed by Ivo Trajkov) shot in 2004. In 2005, The Great Water was shown at many renowned festivals and received a number of awards.

== Filmography ==
| Year | Title | Role |
|---|---|---|
| 1996 | Atje ku nuk lind dielli | |
| 2005 | Metropolet | Beni |
| 2006 | Kosova: Desperate Search | The Soldier |
| 2008 | Time of the Comet | Shestan |
| 2009 | Separation City | Conductor |
| 2009 | Ved Verdens Ende | Rudy Huber |
| 2009 | Get Low | Gary |
| 2009 | Wanderhure | Giso |
| 2010 | Dossier K. | Nazim Tahiri |
| 2010 | Tom und Hacke | GI Schwarzmarkt |
| 2011 | The Berlin Project | Sebastian |
| 2013 | Gone Back | Jim |
| 2013 | Harms | Türke |
| 2014 | Amsterdam Express | Bekim |
| 2019 | The Poison Rose | Lorenzo Rodriquez |
| 2023 | Seneca – On the Creation of Earthquakes | Piso |
| 2024 | Troubleshooters | Luan |
