= Luli Bitri =

Albanian actress (born 1976)

- Born: Luljeta Bitri; 27 June 1976 (age 50); Lushnjë, Albania
- Education: Academy of Arts, Albania
- Occupations: Actress; voice actress; director; screenwriter; producer
- Years active: 2003–present

Luljeta Bitri (born 27 June 1976), better known by her stage name Luli Bitri, is an Albanian actress, director, screenwriter, producer, and voice actress.

== Early life ==
Luli Bitri was born in Lushnjë, Albania, on 27 June 1976. She initially pursued medical studies but abandoned them after her first year to follow her passion for the arts. She then studied drama at the Academy of Fine Arts in Tirana, earning a diploma in professional acting in 2004.

While still a student, Bitri appeared in numerous short films, feature films, and theater productions. She launched her international career with the 2007 film Father and Godfather, directed by Dhimitër Anagnosti, followed by Alive! (2009), directed by Artan Minarolli, and Amnesty (2011), directed by Bujar Alimani. The latter two films were Albania's official submissions for the Academy Award for Best Foreign Language Film in 2009 and 2011, respectively.

In 2018 she starred in the film Holy Boom, directed by Maria Lafi.

== Career ==
Bitri gained international recognition for her portrayal of Elsa in Bujar Alimani's Amnesty, in which she played the title role to great acclaim, earning widespread media attention. The film won the C.I.C.A.E. Prize at the Berlinale International Forum in 2011. That same year, Bitri was nominated for Best Actress at several international film festivals, including the Sarajevo Film Festival, Copenhagen International Film Festival, Lecce European Film Festival (Cineuropa, FIPRESCI, Jury Prize), Jerusalem Film Festival, and Prishtina International Film Festival in Kosovo.

Following Amnesty, she starred in numerous feature films across different countries, including Dimmi che destino avrò (Italy) by Peter Marcias and Holy Boom (Greece) by Maria Lafi. She is also an established stage actress, performing at the National Theatre of Albania.

== Filmography ==
=== Film ===
Year	Title	Role	Notes
2006	Club by Erion Kame	The lover	Short film
2006	Gjoleka, djali i Abazit by Dhimiter Anagnosti	Nejmeja	
2007	Il Primo Kinematografo by Jesus Buonggioaninni	Herself	Documentary film
2008	Alive by Artan Minarolli	Pool girl	
2010	Zheg by Kelmend Karuni	Nevi	Short film
2011	Amnesty by Bujar Alimani	Elsa	Leading role
2011	Dyer, dyer, dyer by Kreshnik Saraci	Daughter	Short film
2012	Dimmi che destino avrò by Peter Marcias	Alina	Leading role
2013	Më në fund në shtëpi by Kreshnik Saraci	Mother	Leading role
2015	Breath by Artur Gorishti	Producer	Short film
2017	Water for the Roses	Director, producer	Short film
2022	The Black Pelicans	Screenwriter, director, producer	Short film
2018	Holy Boom by Maria Lafi	Adia	Leading role
2018	Open Door by Florec Papas	Rudina	Leading role
2019	Love by Dionis Papadhimitri	Ela	Co-protagonist
2022	Winter Fireflies by Artur Gorishti	Afina	Leading role

=== Theatre ===
Year	Title	Role	Director and company
2023	Woyzeck by Georg Büchner	Marie	Kuniaki Ida, National Theatre of Albania
2023	Fallait pas le dire by Salomé Lelouch	Elle	Artan Imami, National Theatre of Albania
2022	Ivanov by Anton Chekov	Anna Petrovna	Hervin Culi, National Theatre of Albania
2021	Edmond by Alexis Michalik	Rosemonde	Andia Xhunga, Indrit Cobani, National Theatre of Albania
2019	August: Osage County by Tracy Letts	Barbara Fordham	Spiro Duni, National Theatre of Albania
2019	Angels in America by Tony Kushner	Angel	Arben Kumbaro, National Theatre of Albania
2018	Macbeth by William Shakespeare	Lady Macbeth	Kled Kapexhiu, National Theatre of Albania
2017	Equus by Peter Shaffer	Hesther Salomon	Dino Mustafic, National Theatre of Albania
2015	Marat/Sade by Peter Weiss	Charlotte Corday	Arben Kumbaro, National Theatre of Albania
2013	Un bacio sul cuore by Michele Placido	Teresa Stolz	Michele Placido, Teatro dell'Opera di Roma
2011	Why Not Stay For Breakfast by Ray Cooney	Louise	Rozi Kostani, National Theatre of Albania
2010	Plus vraie que nature by Martial Courcier	Chloe	Rozi Kostani, Metropol Theatre
2006	Closer by Patrick Marber	Alice	Kico Londo, National Theatre of Albania
2006	La Musica deuxième by Marguerite Duras	Anne Marie	Sonila Kapedani, Academy of Arts of Albania
2005	Ivory Tower by Ronald Harwood	Emmi Straub	Erion Kame, National Theatre of Albania
2004	The Miser by Moliere	Elise	Hervin Culi, National Theatre of Albania
2004	Miss Julie by Strindberg	Miss Julie	Andia Xhunga, Academy of Arts of Albania
2004	The Father by Strindberg	Laura	Niko Kanxheri, Academy of Arts of Albania
2003	Goodbye My Love	The Girl	Arben Kumbaro, National Theatre of Albania
2003	Dull Season in Olympus by Ismail Kadare	The Prostitute	Gezim Kame, National Theatre of Albania

=== Voice acting ===
Year	Title	Role	Notes
2004	Thumbelina	Thumbelina	
2005	Mulan II	Mulan	
2005	The Incredibles	Elastigirl	
2005	Shrek 2	Princess Fiona	
2005	Pirates of the Caribbean: The Curse of the Black Pearl	Elizabeth Swann	
2006	Finding Nemo	Nemo	Redub
2010	The Princess and the Frog	Tiana	
2011	Megamind	Roxanne Ritchi	
2013	Epic	Mary Katherine	
2017	Finding Dory	Nemo	
2018	Incredibles 2	Elastigirl	
2021	Winx Club	Bloom	Seasons 7–8

== Awards and nominations ==
Year	Venue	Award	Result
2011	Prishtina International Film Festival	Best Actress	Won
2011	Sarajevo Film Festival	Best Actress	Nominated
2011	Copenhagen International Film Festival	Best Actress	Nominated
2011	Jerusalem Film Festival	Best Actress	Nominated
2011	Festival de Cinéma de Vernon	Best Actress	Won
2011	Akademia e Çmimeve Kult	Best Actress	Nominated
2012	East West International Film Festival, Orenburg	Best Actress	Won
2012	Albanian Film Festival	Best Albanian Actress	Won
2013	Busto Arsizio Film Festival	Best Actress	Won
2017	New York Albanian Film Festival	Outstanding Artistic Achievement	Won
2019	Aswan International Women Film Festival	Best Actress	Won
2019	Calella Film Festival	Actress Special Mention	Won
