= Sonila Meço =

Albanian television presenter and journalist (born 1977)

- Born: Sonila Meço; 3 July 1977 (age 48); Tirana, PSR Albania
- Occupations: Journalist, television presenter, lecturer
- Years active: 2001–present

Sonila Meço (born 3 July 1977) is an Albanian journalist, television presenter and lecturer. She is best known as the host of talk show "Task Force" airing at Syri TV.

== Career ==
Meço began her career as a television journalist and news anchor at Top Channel TV in 2001, where she worked until 2005. She later joined Vizion Plus (2005–2008) and subsequently TV Klan (2008–2010). In 2010 she moved to ABC News Albania, where she was a journalist and news anchor until 2013.

In 2013 she was appointed News Director at the newly launched TV, Agon Channel, a position she held until the station ceased operations. Since 2018 she hosted the weekly political talk show Tempora on RTV Ora News.

In 2021 she left "Ora News" and joined "Syri TV", where she launched the investigative and political program Task Force.

In March 2024, she served as a judge on the panel of the first season of the reality show Ferma VIP, alongside Enkel Demi.

In parallel with her television career, Meço also worked in academia. She was a lecturer at the University of Tirana, Faculty of Economics from 1999 to 2008, and later at the "European University of Tirana (UET)" from 2008 to 2009.
