= Kazerma =

2025 Albanian drama film

- Directed by: Xhoslin Rama
- Written by: Turjan Hysko
- Starring: Igli Zarka, Turjan Hysko, Fjoralba Ponari, Gentjan Zenelaj, Gerti Ferra
- Cinematography: Shpëtim Baça
- Edited by: Vivian Rama
- Music by: Vivian Rama
- Release date: November 20, 2025
- Running time: 120 minutes
- Country: Albania
- Language: Albanian

Kazerma (English: The Barracks) is a 2025 Albanian thriller film written by Turjan Hysko and Edi Oga, and directed by Xhoslin Rama and Turjan Hysko. The film centers on a reality show competition incorporating elements of military discipline, where contestants are kept under constant surveillance and face physical and psychological challenges.

== Synopsis ==
The film is set in contemporary Albania, where public attention and social media engagement are viewed as metrics of success. The story follows Fredi (Igli Zarka), a former reality show winner, who enters a new format titled Kazerma. The competition takes place in an isolated military barracks, with a grand prize of €200,000.

Following the closure of the competition within the controlled environment, which is surveilled 24/7, the contest gradually shifts into a psychological confrontation. The producer, Arius (Turjan Hysko), and his team aim to incite conflict by exploiting the pasts and secrets of the competitors, blurring the lines between television entertainment and actual danger.

== Cast ==
- Igli Zarka as Fredi
- Turjan Hysko as Arius
- Fjoralba Ponari as Katia
- Gentjan Zenelaj as Nesti
- Gerti Ferra as Tiku
- Rudina Dembacaj as The Author
- Ermira Hysaj as Deana
- Gerhard Koloneci as Dario
- Enisa Hysa as Sonja
- Silvio Goskova as Kudi
- Artemisa Kusi as Valeria
- Arber Aliaj as Koli
- Edvin Mustafa as The Usurer
- Jonida Shehu as Eljona
- Drini Zeqo as Roni
- Hatixhe Brika as Hati
- Xhejni Fama as Loshi
- Rael Hoxha as Amadeus
- Atlant Paris Prifti as Brian
- Valbona Ostreni as Tiku's Wife
- Ges Rabo as Gango
- Edi Oga as The Policeman
- Aurora Qazimi as The Nanny
- Oljana Maloku as News Anchor
- Vanesa Barushi as Velina 1
- Marsela Karaj as Velina 2
- Maya as Arius's Dog

== Production ==
Turjan Hysko serves as producer and co-director, while cinematography was handled by Shpëtim Baça. Editing was performed by Vivian Rama and Xhoslin Rama, and the musical score is attributed to Vivian Rama.

== Release ==
Media reports indicate that the film was released in Albanian cinemas in late November 2025, following premiere events in Tirana.

== Reception ==
Kazerma received coverage from Albanian media following its release, with reviews focusing on its narrative structure, genre approach, and production style.

In a review for Shqiptarja.com, Eduard Zaloshnja described the film as a blend of drama and comedy set within a reality-show format and stated that it uses this framework to address contemporary social themes in Albania. The article noted the film’s direction and screenplay, while also pointing out that some dialogue appeared theatrical in tone.

A review published by Anabel interpreted Kazerma as a satirical depiction of reality television and competition formats, commenting on its cinematography, music, and use of suspense. The article also mentioned pacing and dialogue among the aspects that were less consistent.
