= Xhensila Myrtezaj =

Albanian singer (born 1993)

- Born: 9 April 1993 (age 33); Tirana, Albania
- Occupation: Singer
- Years active: 2007–present
- Spouse: Bes Kallaku (m. 2013; div. 2024)
- Children: 2
- Musical career
- Genres: Pop
- Instrument: Vocals

Xhensila Myrtezaj (Albanian: [dʒɛnˈsila myrtezai]; born 9 April 1993) is an Albanian singer.

== Life and career ==
Myrtezaj was born on 9 April 1993 in Tirana, Albania. Her parents divorced when she was a child. At an early age, she attended the Jordan Misja Lyceum in Tirana. She became known for the talent show "Ethet e së premtes mbrëma", in which she took part at the age of 14. She also took part in the casting show Top Fest with the song "A më do ?" In 2009 she appeared on Top Fest 6 with the song "Ekzistoj", but did not reach the final.

In 2010 Myrtezaj sang "A më do?" at Top Fest 7. In 2011 she took part in Top Fest 8 with the song "Engjëlli" and won the Best Song Award in the Pop / R & B area. In December 2011, Myrtezaj took part in the Albanian preliminary selection for the Eurovision Song Contest 2012, Festivali i Këngës with the song "Lulet mbledh për hënën". She reached the final of the competition where she finished 13th overall.

In November 2016, she released "Uh Baby" with Kosovo-Albanian singer Kida. In June 2018 she sang "Çika Çika" with Ardian Bujupi. This song reached 100 million views on YouTube. They also released "Panorama" together in July 2020 which counts more than 60 million views to date.

== Personal life ==
Myrtezaj was married to Albanian actor, comedian and singer Besart Kallaku. On 12 July 2018, she gave birth to their daughter Ajka. In December 2022, it was announced that the singer and her husband faced disagreements on their relationship and are subjects of a possible divorce. In March 2024 the couple announced that they divorced.

== Discography ==
=== Singles ===
==== As lead artist ====
List of singles as lead artist, with selected chart positions
Title	Year	Peak chart positions			Album
Title	Year	ALB	GER	SWI	Album
"Më fal (Kam frikë)"	2008	—N/a	—	—	Non-album singles
"I vetëm"	2008	—N/a	—	—	Non-album singles
"Ekzistoj"	2009	—N/a	—	—	Non-album singles
"A më do?"	2010	—N/a	—	—	Non-album singles
"Engjëlli im"	2011	—N/a	—	—	Non-album singles
"Dikush të do"	2011	—N/a	—	—	Non-album singles
"Lulet mbledh për hënën"	2011	—N/a	—	—	Non-album singles
"Edhe 1 here"	2012	—N/a	—	—	Non-album singles
"Da da da"	2012	—N/a	—	—	Non-album singles
"Me ty jam"	2012	—N/a	—	—	Non-album singles
"Liar" (featuring Elgit Doda)	2013	—N/a	—	—	Non-album singles
"Jeton tek une"	2014	—N/a	—	—	Non-album singles
"Vespa" (featuring Endri Prifti)	2014	—N/a	—	—	Non-album singles
"Ring The Alarm"	2015	—N/a	—	—	Non-album singles
"Ama dorën" (featuring Mozzik)	2015	7	—	—	Non-album singles
"High Love"	2016	1	—	—	Non-album singles
"Çelsi i zemrës"	2017	18	—	—	Non-album singles
"Çika Çika" (with Ardian Bujupi)	2018	2	90	40	Non-album singles
"Sekreti im" (with Pirro Çako)	2019	12	—	—	Non-album singles
"Paris"	2019	10	—	—	Non-album singles
"Panorama" (with Ardian Bujupi)	2020	4	—	35	Non-album singles
"Ale Ale"	2022	4	—	—	Non-album singles
"Edhe një natë" (with Noizy)	2022	14	—	—	Non-album singles
"Me do" (with Kidda)	2022	50	—	—	Non-album singles
"—" denotes a recording that did not chart or was not released in that territory.

==== As featured artist ====
List of singles as featured artist, with selected chart positions
Title	Year	Peak chart positions	Album
Title	Year	ALB	Album
"Uh Baby" (Kida featuring Xhensila Myrtezaj)	2016	1	Non-album singles
"Lova" (Granit Derguti and Mixey featuring Xhensila Myrtezaj)	2017	4	Non-album singles
"Si të jem mirë" (Irkenc Hyka featuring Xhensila Myrtezaj)	2017	2	Non-album singles
"Çika Çika (Remix)" (Ardian Bujupi and Farruko featuring Xhensila Myrtezaj)	2019	—	Rahat
"Prit pak" (Lumi B featuring Xhensila Myrtezaj)	2021	41	Non-album singles
"Mëkati jem" (Geasy and Majk featuring Xhensila Myrtezaj)	2021	10	Non-album singles
"A e din" (Elgit Doda featuring Xhensila Myrtezaj)	2022	2	Non-album singles
"—" denotes a recording that did not chart or was not released in that territory.
