= Zef Deda =

Albanian comedian (1950–2023)

- Born: 27 July 1950; Shkodër, PR Albania
- Died: 24 November 2023 (aged 73); Tirana, Albania
- Years active: 1990–2023
- Known for: Role in the comedy sketch "Kunati i Shokut Xhemal"
- Spouse: Rozi Deda
- Children: Julian Deda; Marjan Deda
- Awards: Grand Master of the Republic of Albania

Zef Deda (27 July 1950 – 24 November 2023) was an Albanian comedian and stage actor. He was sometimes referred to as the "Charlie Chaplin of Albania" due to his physical comedy and character portrayals.

== Early life and education ==
He was born in Shkodër and completed his early education there. He later attended the Polytechnic School of Construction in Tirana, and enrolled in higher education for Albanian language and literature studies, which he did not complete due to health issues.

== Career ==
Deda began his stage career at the Migjeni Theatre in Shkodër. After a period abroad, he returned to Albania in 1996 and continued his acting career. He appeared in numerous stage performances, television sketches, and comedy programs.

== Notable roles ==
- Kunati i shokut Xhemal
- Kola i dritave
- Charlie Chaplin (impersonation)
- Kushëriri nga Amerika
- Altini (Altufi)
- Children's television appearances
- Gjurmë në kaltërsi (1981)

== Personal life ==
He was married to Rozi Deda and had two sons, including actor and comedian Julian Deda.

== Death ==
Deda died on 24 November 2023 following a long illness.
