= Ermal Mamaqi =

Albanian actor (born 1982)

- Born: 21 March 1982 (age 43); Tirana, PSR Albania
- Occupation: Actor
- Years active: 2004–present

Ermal Mamaqi (born 21 March 1982) is an Albanian former singer and retired actor.

== Career ==
Mamaqi is mostly known for his appearances in Portokalli (2004–2007) and Apartment 2XL (2008–2013). He is also known for hit songs that he created and performed, such as "Dita e Veres" (Summer Day), "Vetem Beso" (Just Believe), and "Ditet e Mia" (My Days).

He began his acting career in 2004 in the TV show Portokalli with the group ShBLSh, when this group was the most preferred sketch in the show. After four seasons on Portokalli, ShBLSh broke up and followed their own interests.

After a year, producer Turjan Hyska called Ermal Mamaqi to join the group again in Apartment 2XL. After three seasons, the show was canceled, and the same actors, producer and TV broadcaster created the Sketch Show Albania. It aired for two seasons but did not succeed.

Mamaqi left Apartment 2XL to publish an album, but declared that he would return in the show's next season. He was the host of Dancing with the Stars Albania for two years, and will now host Kenga Magjike with Albanian presenter and singer Ardit Gjebrea. He was the TV host of 6 Dite Pa Ermalin, and then the TV host of Xing me Ermalin.

== Personal life ==
Mamaqi is married to Albanian television presenter Amarda Toska. Together they have two children, a daughter and a son.

== Discography ==
=== Singles ===
- 2012: "Ku ka si Tirona" ft. Dr. Flori
- 2013: "Do te vij te Dielen " ft. Dr. Flori
- 2013: "Dukesh e bukur "
- 2013: "Ditet e Mia"
- ----: "Mos harro te vish"
- 2012: "Bej si di "
- 2011: "Vetem beso"
- 2012: "O gjo e eger"

== Awards ==
Kenga Magjike

Year	Nominee / work	Award	Result
2011	"Vetem beso tlt"	Best Dance	Won
2012	"Bej si di vete okej"	Best Production	Won

== Filmography ==
Television
Year	Title	Role	Notes
2010–2013	Apartmenti 2XL	Himself	Season 1–6
2009	Portokalli	Himself	Season 1-
2012	Plus	Himself	TV commercial in Albania
2013	Femrat	Riku	Movie
2014	6 Ditë Pa Ermalin	Himself/host	Talk show
2016	Xing me Ermalin	Himself/host	Talk show
2019	2 Gisht Mjaltë	Ervin	Film; Also director, writer, producer
2020	I Love Tropoja	Landi	Film; Also director, co-writer, producer and editor
2022	Qesh Mirë... Kush Qesh i Fundit	Himself	Contestant, season 1, 6th Place
2024	2 Gisht Mjaltë 2	Ervin	Film; Also director, writer, producer
