= Apartamenti 2XL =

Albanian comedy TV show (2010–2018)

- Genre: Non-scripted sketch comedy Alternative comedy In-joke; Improvisational comedy Satire
- Created by: Turjan Hysko
- Directed by: Genti Bejko; Turjan Hysko
- Starring: Julian Deda; Albano Bogdo; Eglen Laknori; Esmeralda Metka; Eliona Pitarka; Visjan Ukcenaj; Andrea Vreto
- Country of origin: Albania
- Original language: Albanian
- No. of seasons: 14
- No. of episodes: 196

Production
- Producer: Turjan Hysko
- Running time: 90 minutes
- Production companies: Vizion Plus; Tring

Original release
- Network: Vizion Plus
- Release: 17 January 2010 – 12 June 2018

Related
- Sketch Show; Grand Hotel 2XL

Apartamenti 2XL was an Albanian improvised sketch comedy television sitcom created and produced by Turjan Hysko which premiered every Tuesday at 21:00 on Vizion Plus from 17 January 2010 to 12 June 2018. The series features a cast of actors, whom the producer, Hysko, provides prompts to in real-time. They have to improvise and act out the prompts, and adjust them as the director pleases.

== Series overview ==
Series	Episodes	Originally released	
Series	Episodes	First released	Last released
1	16	17 January 2010	18 April 2010
2	14	3 October 2010	2 January 2011
3	12	27 February 2011	15 May 2011
4	10	12 February 2012	15 April 2012
5	16	7 October 2012	27 January 2013
6	18	17 February 2013	16 June 2013
7	12	6 October 2013	31 December 2013
8	13	2 March 2014	25 May 2014
9	12	5 October 2014	31 December 2014
10	15	8 March 2016	7 June 2016
11	14	3 October 2016	2 January 2017
12	15	7 March 2017	13 June 2017
13	14	3 October 2017	2 January 2018
14	15	6 March 2018	12 June 2018

== Cast ==
- Julian Deda
- Albano Bogdo
- Esmeralda Metka
- Visjan Ukcenaj
- Andrea Vreto
- Eliona Pitarka
- Eglein Laknori

=== Past members ===
- Ermal Mamaqi
- Gentian Zenelaj
- Lisa Kujofsa
- Erblin Bajko
- Irgen Çela
- Xheni Hallulli
- Ina Gjonçi
- Petrina Çako
- Erand Sojli
- Egzona Ademi
- Oriana Cama
