= Bes Kallaku =

Albanian actor (born 1985)

- Born: Besart Kallaku; 20 November 1985 (age 40); Bubq, Albania
- Other name: Bes Kallaku
- Occupations: Actor, comedian, former footballer and singer
- Known for: Multiple occupations
- Spouse: Xhensila Myrtezaj (m. 2017; div. 2024)
- Children: 2
Association football career
- Position: Forward
Senior career*
| Years | Team | Apps | (Gls) |
| 2013–2015 | Adriatiku | 5 | (0) |
| 2015 | → Korabi (loan) | 2 | (0) |
| 2015–2016 | Shënkolli | 1 | (0) |
| 2016–2017 | Kevitan | | |
- * Club domestic league appearances and goals as of 13 September 2017

Besart Kallaku (born 20 November 1985), commonly known as Bes Kallaku is an Albanian actor, comedian, singer and retired football player.

== Career ==
Currently, he is hosting BE Cafe TV show at Klan TV. He is famously known for acting at Top Channel's famous "Portokalli", a late night comedy show and his charitable endeavours. In addition to the humorous characters he plays, Besart has debuted in two Albanian films, "The Time of Comet" (Në kohën e Kometës) and "Alive" (Gjallë). In 2017, Besart married Xhensila Myrtezaj and moves from Top Channel to Klan TV. Besart, lately entered the music industry by publishing his first single "Katunari Gangsta" in 2011.

== Personal life ==
Kallaku was born in Tirana, Albania from Albanian parents, he converted to Roman Catholicism, prior to marrying his fiancé Xhensila Myrtezaj in a Church ceremony in 2017. In December 2022, it was announced that the couple are facing disagreements on their relationship and are in a subject for a possible divorce. In March 2024 the couple announced on the internet that they were divorced.

== Discography ==
=== Singles ===
- 2011 – "Katunari Gangsta"
- 2012 – "Regga Katunari"
- 2012 – "Eminemi i Katunarve"
- 2013 – "Loku ke blloku" (feat. Rati)
- 2013 – "Kom me te thy n'mes"
- 2013 – "A ti bim o bish"
- 2014 – "Jeta e funit" (feat. Rati)
- 2014 – "Skifterat" (feat. Rati)
- 2015 – "Me temina" (feat. Rati & Big Mama)
- 2015 – "Skifterat 2" (feat. Rati)
- 2016 – "S3 Amsterdam" (feat. Rati)
- 2016 – "Unaza" (feat. Muharrem Ahmeti)
- 2016 – "Si mjalti" (feat. Leonard)
- 2017 – "Gezuar Baftjar" (feat. Ylli Baka
- 2017 – "N'Dashni" (feat. Olsi Bylyku)
- 2017 – "Skifterja Zemres" (feat. Klajdi Haruni)
- 2018 – "Cohu kerceni" (feat. Ylli Baka)
- 2018 – "Daja" (feat. Ermal Fejzullahu)
- 2018 – "Makarena" (feat. Irkenc Hyka)
- 2018 – "O bir" (feat. Dani)
- 2019 – "Si rrush" (feat. Fatima Ymeri)
- 2019 – "Ca m'ke bo" (feat. Imbro Manaj)
- 2020 - "KTG"
- 2020 - Ciao po te le (feat. Anila Mimani)
- 2021 - Rudina (feat. Andi Shkoza)

== Selected filmography ==
As of 11 August 2017

| Year | Title | Role | Other notes |
|---|---|---|---|
| 2004–2017 | Portokalli | Different roles | TV series |
| 2008 | Time of the Comet | | |
| 2009 | Alive | Fikja | |
| 2010–2011 | Radio Radio | Lloni | TV series |
| 2016 | Pit Stop Mafia | Tulla | |
| 2017 | The Brave (aka Lazarat) | Ilir | |
| 2018 | The Temptation of Charles | The hit man | Announced |
| 2018 | Akira's Flying Wheelchair | Sumo | Filming |
