= Masiela Lusha =

American actress and author

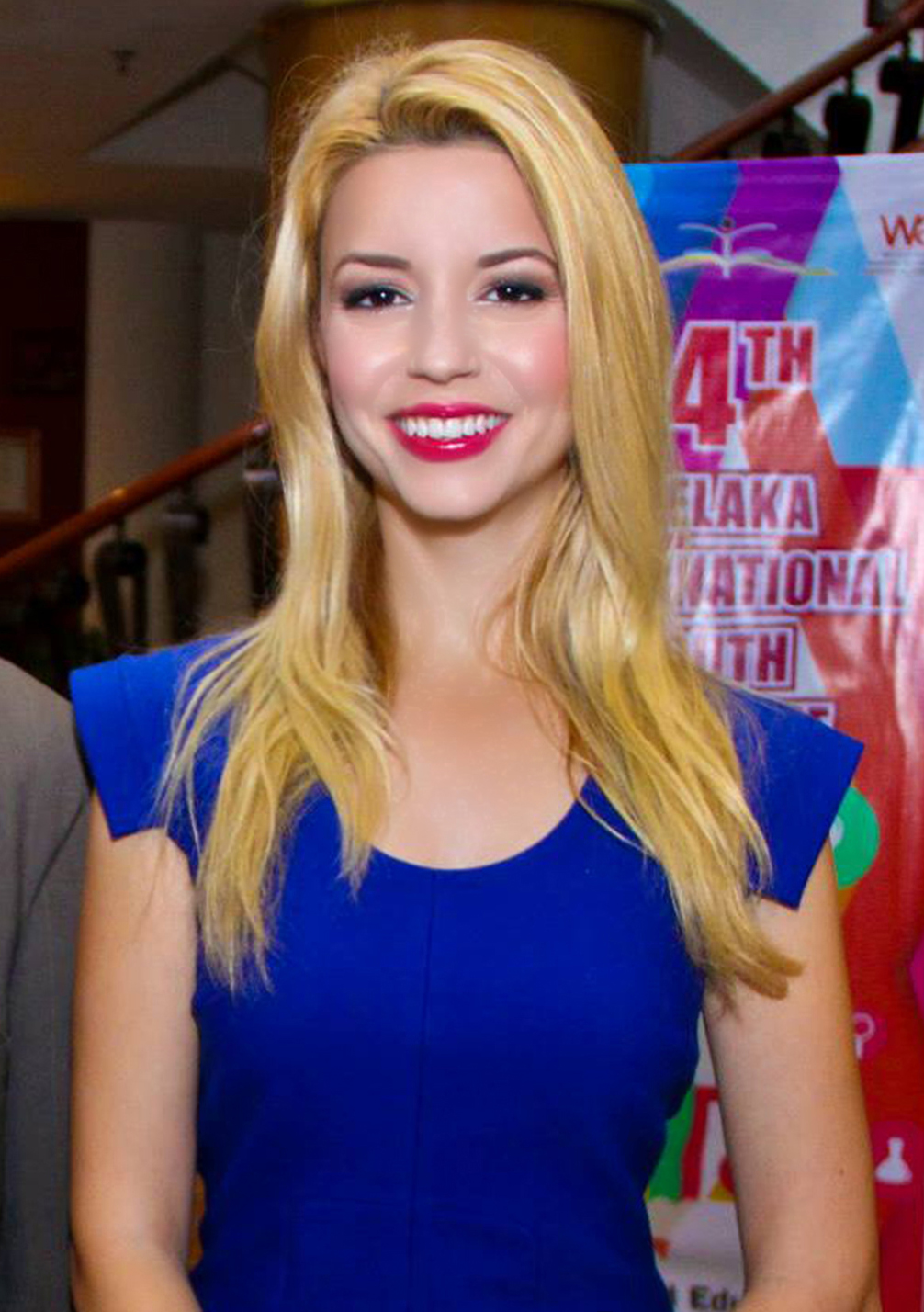
- Lusha in 2014
- Born: October 23, 1985 (age 40); Tirana, PSR Albania
- Education: University of California, Los Angeles (BA)
- Occupations: Actress; poet
- Years active: 1998–present
- Notable work: Drinking the Moon; The Besa; Inner Thoughts
- Spouse: Ramzi Habibi (m. 2013)
- Children: 2
- Awards: 2 Young Artist Awards for Leading Young Actress in a Comedy and Drama

Signature
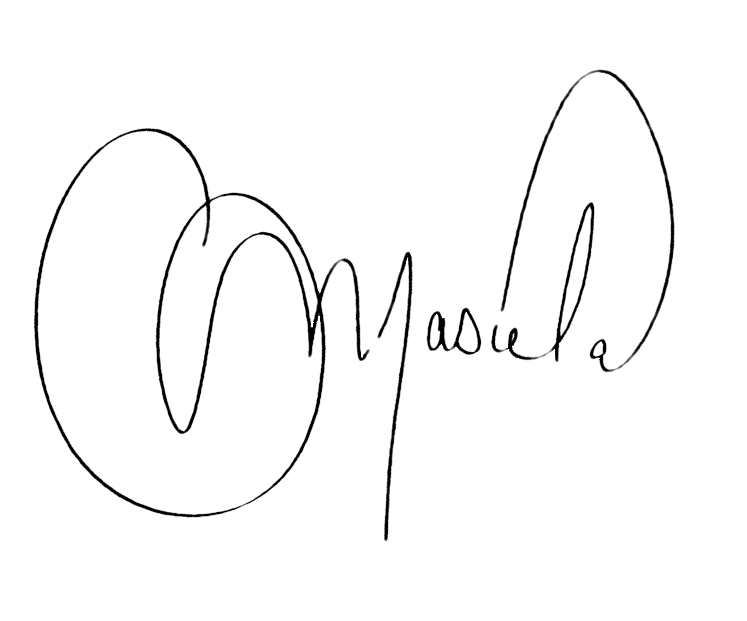

Masiela Lusha (/ˌmɑːsiˈɛlə ˈluːʃə/; born October 23, 1985) is an Albanian-American actress and author. She gained recognition for playing Carmen Lopez on the globally syndicated ABC sitcom George Lopez, a role that earned her two consecutive Young Artist Awards for Leading Young Actress in a Comedy or Drama. After transitioning into film, she starred in Sony Pictures’ Blood: The Last Vampire. Lusha also starred alongside David Hasselhoff and Ian Ziering in SyFy's television movie Sharknado: The 4th Awakens.

Lusha made her acting debut in Summoning in 2001. That same year, she made her television debut in the Disney Channel series, Lizzie McGuire. Lusha appeared as a main cast member in Clifford's Puppy Days (2003-2005) for PBS, and also appeared in Law & Order: Criminal Intent, and Anger Management. Lusha starred in movies comprising a variety of genres, including Cherry Bomb (2004), My Father's Eulogy (2007), Muertas (2007), Time of the Comet (2008), Ballad of Broken Angels (2009), Kill Katie Malone (2010), Dragonfyre (2013), The Architect (2014), Of Silence (2014), Fatal Instinct (2014), and Branded (2016).

In 2010, Lusha was appointed ambassador of Prince Harry's charity Sentebale. In 2014, Lusha was made the World Assembly of Youth's goodwill ambassador. Lusha is an advocate for UN Women.

Lusha has written five books of poetry, Inner Thoughts, Drinking the Moon, Amore Celeste, The Call, The Living Air; a novel, The Besa; and two children's books. Lusha has written poetry and translated it into Albanian. She has translated poems and prayers by Mother Teresa.

== Early life ==
Lusha was born in Tirana, Albania, and is the child of Max and Daniela Lusha. Her mother was a magazine publisher. In 1990, Lusha and her family left Albania as refugees. Upon leaving Albania, Lusha moved to Budapest and Vienna. In an interview in 2016, Lusha credits her early memories as a refugee for her lifelong humanitarian efforts.

=== Childhood and adolescence in America ===
At the age of seven, Lusha moved to Michigan where she and her mother reunited with her great-uncle Dr. Joseph H. Alli. Dr. Alli was a colonel in the army during World War II, and chief of laboratories for the United States Department of Veterans Affairs. English was Lusha's fourth language, after Albanian, Hungarian, and German. At the age of twelve, Lusha began a modeling career in Michigan. After a few months of professional modeling and acting in local theater plays, she was discovered by a Hollywood talent agent who held an open call in Detroit, Michigan. That following year, while acting in Los Angeles, Lusha became a published author with her first book of poetry, Inner Thoughts.

== Literary career ==
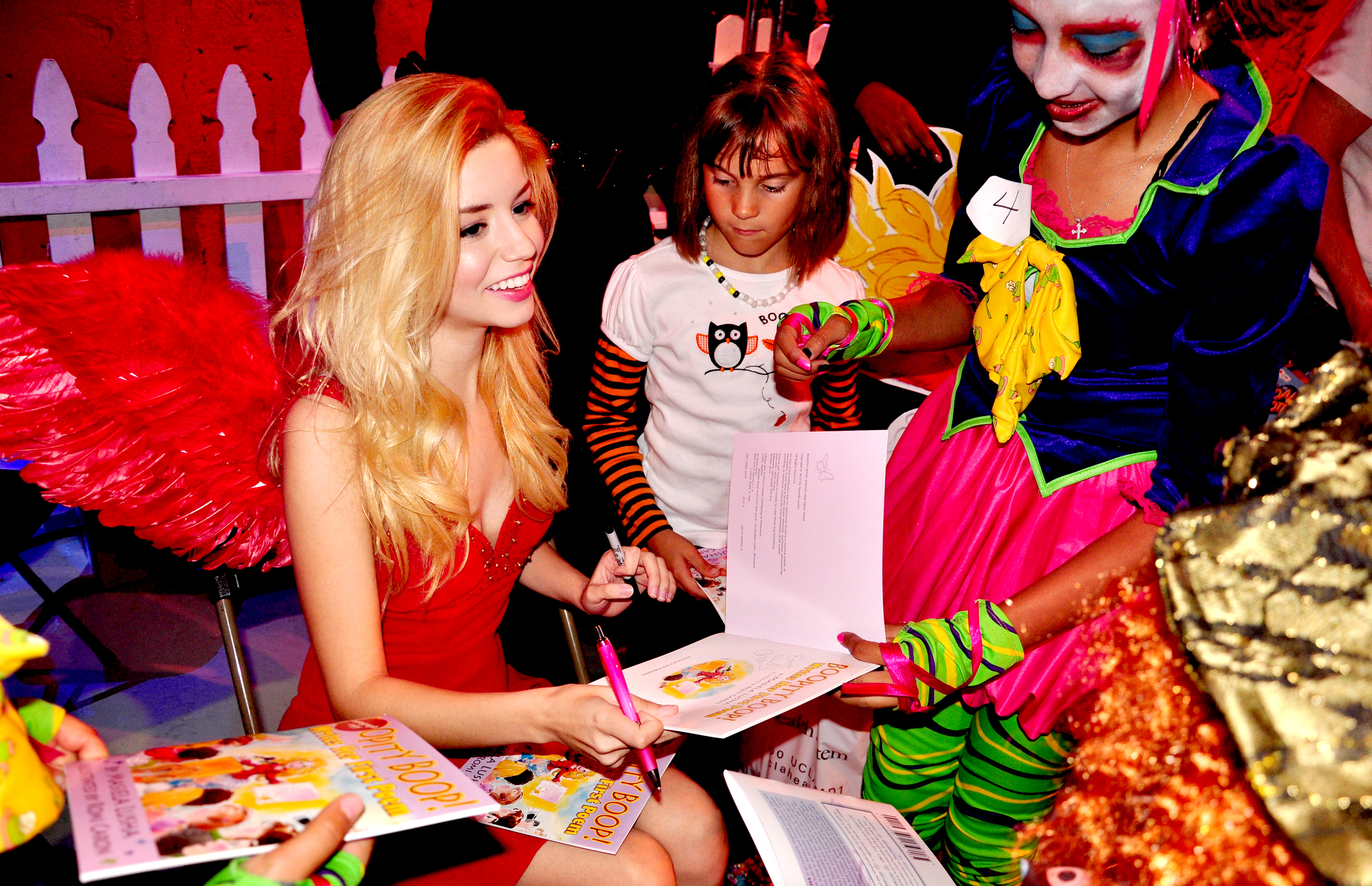
Lusha signing copies of her book, in October 2010.

=== Early recognition (1997–2004) ===
As a poet, Lusha was recognized as one of the Top Ten Talented Poets of North America for her published work, and also received the public recognition of former President Bill Clinton. Upon graduating high school, Lusha had published two collections of poetry. As of 2010, Lusha has since written seven books.

=== Drinking the Moon, The Living Air, a novel and children's books (2005–present) ===
From 2005 to 2010, Lusha wrote four poetry books. While filming George Lopez, Lusha published her second book, Drinking the Moon In 2010, Lusha wrote Boopity Boop Writes Her First Poem. Lusha chose poetry as the subject matter for her children's book because, "While some mothers sing lullabies to their children, my mother read me poetry," she said. "And to this day, I associate my strongest and most insistent feelings with words lyrically organized on a page." In 2016, Lusha released her fourth book of poetry, The Living Air.

In an interview, Lusha revealed that she completed her novel, The Besa, in one month, writing from 6 am until 8 pm every day while forgetting to eat. For her writing, Lusha also says, "In any art form, we have a responsibility to infuse a little color, compassion, movement into our society. Art cannot live in a void. It must impact, animate a little tug and pull in our world to stay alive and relevant."

== Acting career ==
=== Career beginnings and early roles (1997–1999) ===
Lusha launched her career as a model and theater actress in Michigan. While residing in her hometown, Lusha's first theatrical role was a nonspeaking, background character in her school's production of Up and Away. Upon entering the drama department, Lusha then portrayed the role of Cinderella in the play, The Last Dress Rehearsal and Belle in Beauty and the Beast. She also portrayed an Oompa Loompa and a Tap-Dancing Box in the play, Charlie and the Chocolate Factory. Soon after moving to California, Lusha was selected as the principle fashion model in a multinational Back-to-School J. C. Penney television campaign which aired in America and South America, and was cast in the Alanis Morissette music video "Hands Clean".

=== Hollywood: George Lopez and breakthrough (2000–2007) ===
Then in 2000, it was Lusha's television debut with a guest appearance on the Disney Channel series Lizzie McGuire as the character Olivia in the episode "Last Year's Model". Lusha made her film debut in the 2000 film A Father's Love as Lisa, the lead who reminisces on her experiences with her father.

In 2001, she was picked to play Carmen Lopez on the newly developed ABC sitcom George Lopez. Sandra Bullock and Bruce Helford were the show's executive producers. After completing its 120th episode, the show reached global syndication and established Lusha as a TV veteran by the age of 20. That following year, the George Lopez show won an Emmy and was established as the second-longest-running sitcom in television history to star a Hispanic lead, after I Love Lucy. In 2007, Lusha's character Carmen was written off the show due to "creative differences".

Lusha won two consecutive Young Artist Awards for Best Leading Actress in a Comedy and Drama for her portrayal as Carmen. While working on George Lopez, Lusha also voiced the role of Nina for four years on the PBS series Clifford's Puppy Days. It has been reported that portraying the character of Nina introduced Lusha to children's entertainment, inspiring her to write a children's book in 2009.

=== International film roles and global recognition (2008–present) ===
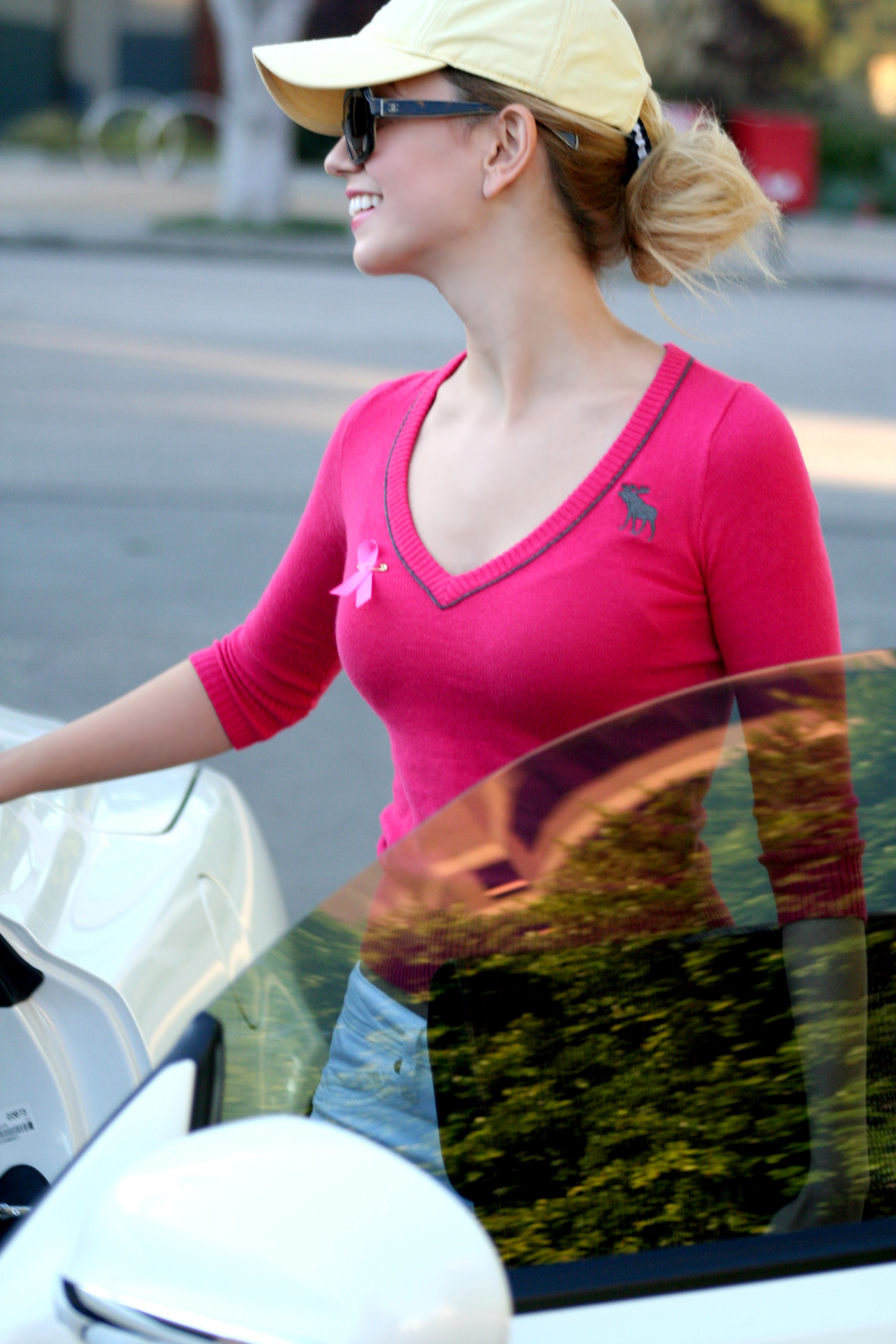
Lusha photographed at Warner Brothers Studios

In December 2009, Lusha joined the original cast of George Lopez for a televised reunion on Lopez Tonight. During the live reunion taping, when asked about her experiences on the show, Lusha said: "it is the show that keeps giving. Every year it offers something to society and it offered something to each and every one of us. It brought us all together for a lifetime".

Lusha has since appeared as Mira on an episode of Law & Order: Criminal Intent. At the suggestion of George Clooney, Lusha has also appeared in the Spanish language film Muertas (2008) in which she portrayed the main character Aracelli.

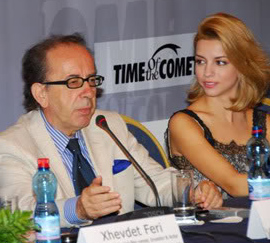
Lusha with poet laureate Ismail Kadare during a press conference for the film Time of the Comet

Lusha also starred as Saint Agnes in the Albanian production of Time of the Comet (2008) based on the novel A Difficult Year by Ismail Kadare. Throughout the film, Lusha's dialogue was in a specific Albanian dialect. In the film, Lusha plays a catholic nun who falls in love with a Muslim rebel.

Lusha portrayed the role of Sharon, the sword-wielding, vampire in disguise, in the Sony Pictures remake of the cult classic Blood: The Last Vampire alongside Jun Ji-hyun. The film was co-produced by French company Pathé. In 2009, the film premiered in Japan and was released internationally by Sony Pictures.

In 2011, Lusha also starred in the films Katie Malone and The Architect. In Katie Malone, she portrayed the role of Ginger, a premed college student who is tormented by the ghost of a slave girl. One Tree Hill actor Stephen Colletti and Superman star Dean Cain costarred in the movie. The film was released by American World Pictures. In The Architect, Lusha acted alongside Stacy Keach. In 2012, Lusha also starred in the film Of Silence, alongside Muse Watson.

In 2012, Lusha starred in the film Orc Wars, portraying the role of Princess Aleya, the last remaining elven warrior.

Lusha re-teamed with George Lopez creator and executive producer Bruce Helford on the FX series Anger Management. Lusha portrayed the love interest Molly in the episode "Charlie and Sean Fight Over A Girl".

Lusha was cast as one of the leads in SyFy's Sharknado: The 4th Awakens and Sharknado 5: Global Swarming. Lusha portrayed Gemini, the cousin of Ian Ziering's character, and niece of David Hasselhoff's character.

In 2017, Lusha starred in the Lifetime film Forgotten Evil. In the film, she portrayed Renee / Jane Doe, a woman suffering from amnesia. Without a past, Renee is forced to face a new reality with emerging challenges. Re-teaming with Sharknado director Anthony C. Ferrante, it is reported that the role was written with Lusha in mind.

== Humanitarian work and public service campaigns ==
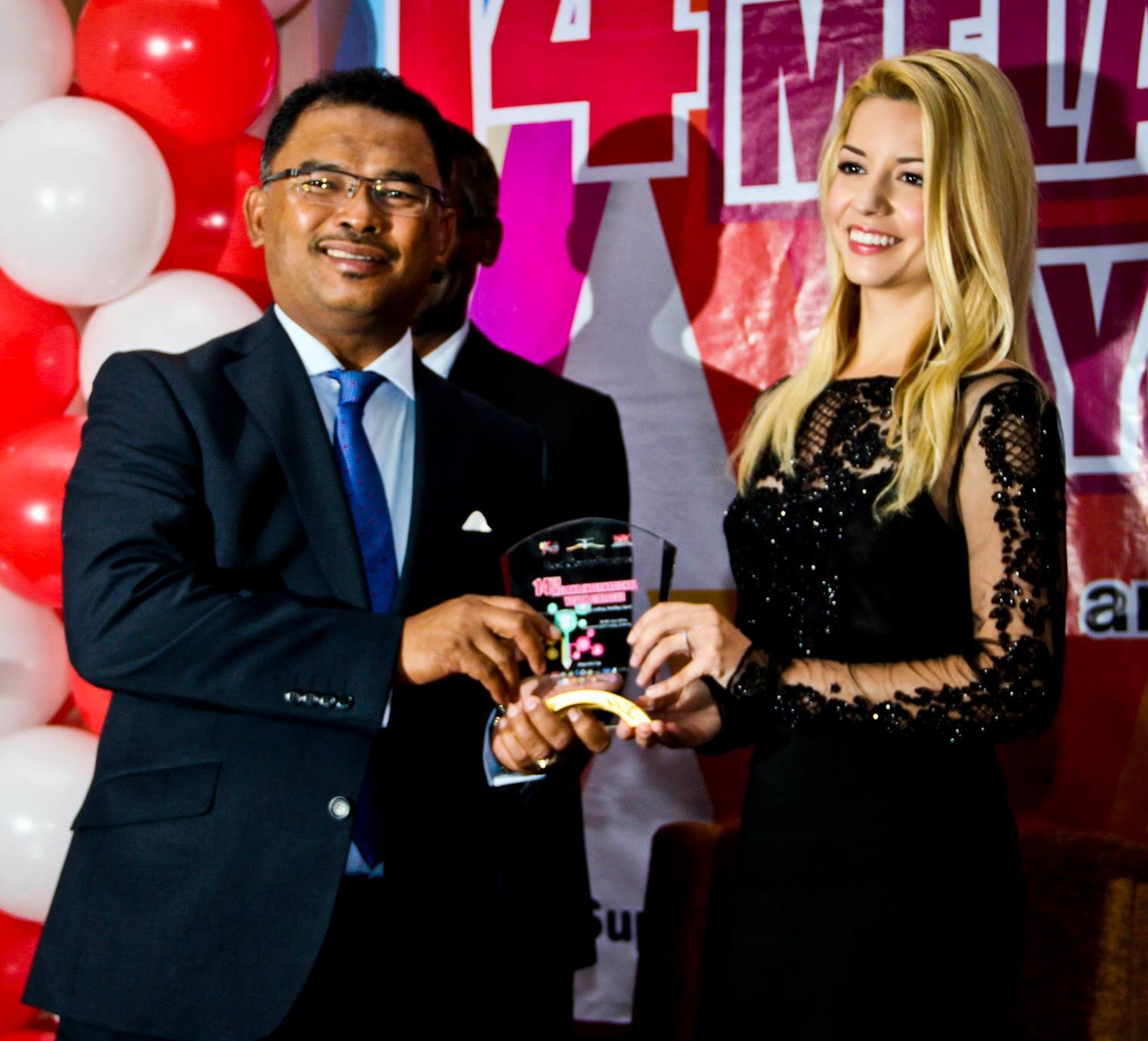
Goodwill Ambassador Masiela Lusha and WAY president, Idris Haron, attending a WAY event in 2014

In a 2016 interview, Lusha credited her childhood memories as a refugee for the drive behind her efforts as a humanitarian. In the same interview Lusha noted that her earliest memory was on a bus with her mother, fleeing Albania. Because of numerous bomb threats targeted at the bus, an international organization provided volunteers to sit in the bus with the refugees, allowing the people to enter Hungary safely. Lusha stated that because of these experiences, "humanitarianism is the bedrock of [her] existence and identity."

In 2010, Lusha was appointed Ambassador for Prince Harry's charity, Sentebale. The charity was founded by Prince Harry and Prince Seeiso of Lesotho, Africa in memory of their mothers, Diana, Princess of Wales, and Queen Mamohato of Lesotho. The cause helps vulnerable children in Lesotho, Africa through various grassroots efforts.

Lusha was the spokesperson for Scholastic's Read for Life, and she has been involved in national PSA commercials and school readings across the country. Throughout her career, Lusha has promoted "the value of appreciating the written word". As the national spokesperson for the Great American Bake Sale, a hunger-relief program, Lusha visits local towns throughout the United States and supports food drives to help battle childhood hunger. For her role as a national spokesperson, Lusha promotes the importance of raising funds to help local communities.

Lusha founded the Children of the World Foundation, a 501(c)(3) nonprofit that offers food, shelter and education to families in deprived conditions. For Children of the World, she donated 10 acres (40,000 m^{2}) of land for a community center focused on rehabilitating families in need.

In the spring of 2013, Athgo International appointed Lusha as their Ambassador for Youth. As an Ambassador, Lusha encouraged a dialogue between aspiring global entrepreneurs and Athgo's bodies of support such as the World Bank Group, the United Nations, and international universities. Lusha will participate with Paul Kagame, President of the Republic of Rwanda and Dr. Hamadoun Touré, Secretary-General of ITU and vice-chairman of the Broadband Commission for Digital Development.

World Assembly of Youth appointed Lusha as their first Goodwill Ambassador. WAY co-operates with the UN and many of its special agencies, particularly with UNAIDS, UNEP, ILO, UNESCO, UNFPA, UNICEF and WHO. As ambassador, Lusha promoted diverse causes concerning the global youth, such as improving gender equality, promote the democratic participation, increase inter-ethnic respect and to foster inter-cultural and international understanding and cooperation.

== Personal life ==
During the filming of George Lopez, Lusha was reportedly privately schooled on set. Lusha graduated from Burbank High School at the age of 15. She later attended Glendale College, in Southern California, graduating with an AA degree and transferring to UCLA as a junior at the age of 18. While at UCLA, Lusha majored in Creative Writing. She also earned a degree from FIDM, and credits her education when designing and sewing her own clothes on the red carpet.

In 2012, Lusha began dating financier Ramzi Habibi. In July 2013, it was announced that the two were engaged. On December 28, 2013, the couple married on Wanaka Peak in Queenstown, New Zealand. The couple have 2 children, a son, born in February 2018, and a daughter born in October 2020.

== Bibliography ==
=== Poetry collections ===
- Inner Thoughts (1999)
- Drinking the Moon (2005)
- Amore Celeste (2009)
- The Call (2010)
- The Living Air (2016)

=== Collected prose and novels ===
- The Besa (2008)

=== Children's books ===
- Boopity Boop! Writes Her First Poem (2010)
- Boopity Boop! Goes To Hawaii (2010)

== Filmography ==
=== Film ===
Year	Title	Role	Notes
2000	Father's Love	Lisa	
2002	Las muertas de Juarez	Aracelli	
2004	Cherry Bomb	Kim	
2008	Time of the Comet	Agnes	
2009	Blood: The Last Vampire	Sharon	
2009	Ballad of Broken Angels: Harmony	Rox	
2010	Kill Katie Malone	Ginger	
2012	The Architect	Iliriana	
2013	Dragonfyre	Princess Aleya	
2014	Of Silence	Annabelle	
2014	Fatal Instinct	Melissa Gates	
2017	Branded	Donna	

=== Television ===
Year	Title	Role	Notes
2001	Lizzie McGuire	Friend	Episode: "Last Year's Model"
2002–2007	George Lopez	Carmen Lopez	Main role (seasons 1–5)
2003–2005	Clifford's Puppy Days	Nina Flores	Recurring voice role
2006	Law & Order: Criminal Intent	Mira	Episode: "Blasters"
2014	Anger Management	Molly	Episode: "Charlie and Sean Fight Over a Girl"
2016	Sharknado: The 4th Awakens	Gemini	Television film
2017	Forgotten Evil	Renee / Jane Doe / Veronica	Television film
2017	Lopez	Herself	Episode: "George Dates His Daughter"
2017	Sharknado 5: Global Swarming	Gemini	Television film
2018	The Last Sharknado: It's About Time	Gemini	Television film
2019	My Best Friend's Christmas	Bella Vega	Television film; also known as Christmas Sweethearts

== Awards ==
Year	Award	Category	Work	Result	Refs
2003	Young Artist Award	Best Performance in a TV Series (Comedy or Drama) – Leading Young Actress	George Lopez	Won	
2004	Young Artist Award	Best Performance in a Voice-Over Role – Young Actress	Clifford's Puppy Days	Nominated	
2004	Young Artist Award	Best Performance in a TV Series (Comedy or Drama) – Leading Young Actress	George Lopez	Won	
