= Portokalli =

- Genre: Comedy show
- Directed by: Ilir Muhametaj
- Creative director: Ledion Liço
- Presented by: Currently: Salsano Rrapi; Nevina Shtylla; Kiara Tito; Formerly: Agron Llakaj; Amarda Toska; Eneda Tarifa; Xhemi Shehu; Ornela Bregu
- Country of origin: Albania
- Original language: Albanian
- No. of seasons: 40

Production
- Executive producer: Top Channel
- Production locations: Currently: Kashar, Tirana, Albania; Formerly: Qëndra Ndërkombëtarë e Kulturës, Tirana
- Camera setup: Multi-camera
- Running time: 130 min
- Production company: Top Channel

Original release
- Network: Top Channel
- Release: 31 December 2003 – present
- Network: DigitAlb

Related
- Saturday Night Live

Portokalli (transl. Orange) is an Albanian weekly night sketch comedy and variety show that airs on Top Channel. It began airing on 31 December 2003 and it includes stand-up comedy and live music which makes it similar to the American late-night live television show Saturday Night Live. The show is known to make fun of everyday problems through humor and satire. It also makes fun of political figures such as Sali Berisha, Edi Rama, Hashim Thaçi, Ramush Haradinaj, Lulzim Basha, Ilir Meta, Jozefina Topalli and Alfred Moisiu, including other world leaders like Emmanuel Macron, Vladimir Putin, Aleksandar Vučić, Donald Trump, Kim Jong Un, Angela Merkel and their relations with Albania. Portokalli reaches an audience of many ages and it is filmed in Kashar.

== Cast ==
- Agron Llakaj - until 2010
- Tan Brahimi
- Florjan Binaj - Until 2022
- Gazmend Paja
- Errand Sojli - Until 2014
- Ledio Lako
- Salsano Rrapi
- Rezart Veleshnja - Until 2022
- Albana Perhati
- Marin Orhanasi
- Gent Bejko - until 2010
- Elvis Pupa - Until 2008
- Romir Zalla
- Ermal Mamaqi - until 2008
- Gentian Zenelaj - until 2008
- Julian Deda - until 2008
- Ervina Kotolloshi
- Besart Kallaku - until 2017
- Irgen Çela
- Erion Isai until 2017
- Gent Hazizi - until 2014
- Ervin Bejleri
- Xheni Hallulli - until 2013
- Renada Caci - until 2022
- Erdit Asllanaj
- Suela Xhonuzi - until 2006
- Eneda Tarifa
- Xhemi Shehu - until 2022
- Roland Saro
- Bes Bitraku
- Jorke Broka
- Ilia Kaci - until 2018
- Kreshnik Ibrahimi
- Arben Dervishi
- Linda Jarani
- Rudina Dembacaj - until 2012
- Erblin Bajko
- Ergys Cekrezi
- Olsi Bylyku - until 2018
- Aleksandër Grami
- Delinda Zhupa
- Genci Fuga
- Gladiola Harizaj
- Dejvis Myslymi
- Juxhin Plovishti
- Visjan Ukcenaj since 2023
- Aleks Seitaj - until 2021
- Kejd Gishto - since 2023

== Viewers ==
Portokalli attracts over 1 million viewers in Albania, Kosovo, North Macedonia and Diaspora.

Country	Viewers (~)
Albania	800,000
Kosovo	100,000
North Macedonia	20,000
Diaspora	100,000

== Parts of Portokalli ==
- Një det me info (One sea with info)
- Portokill
- The SHBLSH
- RTV Kashari (Radiotelevision Kashar)
- Loja për Pushtet (Game for Power, Game of thrones parody)
- Kimikati (the Chemical)
- Bukra dhe sekretarja e saj (Bukra and her secretary)
- Dy Policat (The Two Policemen) [Formerly known as: Polici (The Policemen) / 2006-2015]
- Çifti i lumtur (Happy couple)
- TV Truthi (Truthi TV)
- Danoci Sh.p.k (Danoci Ltd)
- Muli Event
- Atentatet (Assassinations)
- InstaGirls (the Instagram Girls)
- Bab e bir (Father and Son)
- Burgu Privat (the Private Prison)
- Pasdite dhe Portokalle (Afternoons and Oranges)
- Familja Astari (Astari Family)
- Bukra dhe Luzja (Bukra and Luzja)
- Ramadan Kafsha

North King Minioni Kuzhinjeri Daja Dhe Nipi

- Bela dhe Stela (Bela and Stela)
- Piceri Django (Django Pizzeria)
- Nini dhe Vini (Nini and Vini)
- Mami dhe Vajza (Mother and Daughter)
- Zona e Brrylit (Brryli Zone)
- Koha Jote Show (Your Time Show, game show parody)
- Big Brother VIP Portokalli (spin-off of Big Brother VIP)
