= Time of the Comet =

- Theatrical poster
- Directed by: Fatmir Koçi
- Written by: Fatmir Koçi
- Based on: novel by Ismail Kadare titled Black Year (Albanian: Viti i Mbrapshtë)
- Produced by: Kkoci Productions
- Starring: Blerim Destani; Masiela Lusha; Xhevdet Ferri; Thomas Heinze; Vlado Jovanovski; Çun Lajçi
- Music by: Nexhat Mujovi
- Release date: 2008
- Running time: 104 minutes
- Country: Albania
- Language: Albanian
- Budget: $2 million

Time of the Comet (Albanian: Koha e Kometës) is a 2008 Albanian historical drama/black comedy film adapted from the 1985 novel by Albanian author Ismail Kadare titled Black Year (Albanian: Viti i Mbrapshtë). The film was directed by Fatmir Koçi, while Blerim Destani and Masiela Lusha starred in the leading roles. German bodybuilder and actor Ralf Möller also appeared in the film.

== Plot ==
The film takes place in 1914 when William of Wied was enthroned as Prince of Albania, and the Principality of Albania was occupied by all the neighbouring countries. Shestan (Blerim Destani), a young idealist villager forms a band and travels the country trying to find enemy troops to fight.

During his journeys he comes across many opposing factions like the Ottoman loyalist band of Kus Baba (Çun Lajçi) and meets Agnes (Masiela Lusha), whose father wants her to become a Catholic nun, and falls in love with her. However, Shestan continues his journey and arrives at Prince William's headquarters where he offers his services and asks to fight on the frontline but the prince mocks his willingness to fight. Shestan, while being extremely disappointed decides to return to his village but on the way back home he comes across Agnes who has been kidnapped by "Mad Ahmed", a Muslim extremist and saves her.

After arriving home Shestan and Agnes get married but on their wedding day Archduke Franz Ferdinand of Austria, heir apparent to the Austro-Hungarian throne, and his wife, Sophie, Duchess of Hohenberg, are assassinated in Sarajevo marking the beginning of World War I. When Shestan learns about the beginning of the war, his companions ask him about their future actions and the film ends with Shestan replying to them "Play the music louder".

== Cast ==
- Blerim Destani as Shestan
- Masiela Lusha as Agnes
- Xhevdet Ferri as Agnes's father
- Thomas Heinze as William, Prince of Albania
- Vlado Jovanovski as Meto
- Çun Lajçi as Kus Babaj
- Ralf Möller as Freiherr von Keittel
- Blerim Gjoci
- Xhevdet Jashari
- Luan Jaha as Doskë Mokrari
- Bes Kallaku
- Adem Karaga
- Gentian Zenelaj

== Reception ==
Time of the Comet was very successful in Albania and set a new box office record. Fatmir Koçi, the director of the film was criticized because of the script changes he made while adapting Ismail Kadare's novel. American actress Masiela Lusha received praise for her acting performance, however some questioned her level of knowledge in the rural Gheg Albanian dialect. Lusha is known to speak the official Midland Albanian dialect. Çun Lajçi's performance as Kus Baba was also praised by many critics.

== Awards ==
The film won the Audience Award in the Prishtina International Film Festival and the Best Albanian Movie in the International Summer Film Festival, held in the city of Durrës for the first time.
