= Turjan Hysko =

Albanian television and film producer (born 1985)

- Born: 30 March 1985 (age 41); Berat, Albania
- Occupations: Television producer, film producer, former singer, former songwriter
- Years active: 2000s–present
- Spouse: Orinda Huta (m. 2017)

Turjan Hysko (born 30 March 1985) is an Albanian television and film producer, former singer and songwriter. He is known for creating and producing the television sitcom Apartamenti 2XL and its spin-off Grand Hotel 2XL, Klanifornia, Duplex, as well as for his involvement in the 2025 film Kazerma.

== Early life and education ==
Hysko was born in Berat and completed his primary and secondary education there. He later moved to Tirana, where he attended the Petro Nini Luarasi High School. During this period, he co-founded the pop-rap group Produkt 28.

== Career ==
Hysko began his career in music as a member of the pop-rap group Produkt 28. He later moved into television, initially working as a presenter and later as a producer for Albanian broadcasters including Vizion Plus and Tring.

In 2010, he created and produced the improvisational sketch-sitcom Apartamenti 2XL, which aired on Vizion Plus from 17 January 2010 until 12 June 2018. The series was based on improvised scenes guided by prompts provided during recording. A related series, Grand Hotel 2XL, was later produced within the same television franchise.

In October 2019, Hysko created and produced the comedy television programme Klanifornia, which was broadcast on TV Klan. The programme began airing in October 2019 and continued for several seasons.

In 2025, Hysko worked in cinema with the feature film Kazerma, in which he served as producer, co-director, co-writer and actor.

== Television ==
Year(s)	Title	Role	Network
2010–2018	Apartamenti 2XL	Creator, producer	Vizion Plus
2010s	Grand Hotel 2XL	Creator, producer	Vizion Plus
2018–2019	Duplex	Creator, producer	TV Klan
2019–2023	Klanifornia	Creator, producer	TV Klan

== Film ==
Year	Title	Role	Notes
2025	Kazerma	Arius	Producer, co-director, co-writer, actor

== Personal life ==
Hysko has been married to singer and television presenter Orinda Huta since 2017.
