= Vjosa Berisha =

Kosovan film director (1972–2022)

Vjosa Berisha (23 July 1972 – 23 June 2022) was a director, co-owner, and executive director of B2 – PR & Media Solutions, a production and public relations company established in 2003 with offices in Kosovo and Albania. She was also a co-founder and director of PriFilmFest – the Prishtina International Film Festival in Pristina. From 2013, she was a member of the European Film Academy.

== Biography ==
Vjosa Berisha was born in Pristina on 23 July 1972, where she finished primary and secondary school. Berisha earned a master's degree in arts in Media and Communication from the University of Westminster, London, in the United Kingdom, and a postgraduate diploma in Contemporary Diplomacy from the University of Malta. With over 20 years of experience in the film industry, she played a significant role in various PR and media projects. Her contributions were crucial during the Independence Declaration campaign in Kosovo in 2008, supported by USAID and the Government of Kosovo.

Together with her husband, director Fatos Berisha, she founded the International Film Festival in Pristina with the inspiring motto "Friendship. Forever" In addition to her organisational role, she produced two artistic films, "Flying Circus" (2019) and co-produced the Macedonian film "The Happiness Effect" (2019). Berisha's filmography also includes producing television programs and documentaries. She was known for her passion for film, and support for young talents in Kosovo and the region. Beyond her contributions to the film industry, she was an advocate for human rights, women's rights, and LGBTQ rights.

Berisha died in London on 23 June 2022 at the age of 49.
