= Amnesty (2011 film) =

2011 Albanian film directed by Bujar Alimani

- French film poster
- Directed by: Bujar Alimani
- Written by: Bujar Alimani
- Produced by: Tefta Bejko
- Starring: Luli Bitri
- Cinematography: Elias Adamis
- Edited by: Bonita Papastathi
- Music by: Hekuran Pere
- Production companies: Fantasia; Arizona Films Productions; 90 Productions
- Distributed by: Arizona Films Distribution; One from the Heart
- Release date: February 2011 (Berlin)
- Running time: 83 minutes
- Country: Albania
- Language: Albanian
- Budget: €700,000

Amnesty (Albanian: Amnistia) is a 2011 Albanian drama film written and directed by Bujar Alimani. It was Albania's nominee for Academy Award for Best International Feature Film at the 84th Academy Awards, but was not one of the finalists.

== Plot ==
Elsa (Luli Bitri) is a woman with two children, recently unemployed, and living in post-communist Pogradec, Albania in grim circumstances. She is helped by her father-in-law Remzi (Todi Llupi). Her husband is in prison in Tirana for gambling and debt issues. The prison institutes a conjugal visit program, and during her visits she meets and falls in love with another conjugal visit participant Shpetim (Karafil Shena), whose wife is in prison for forging immigration certificates. Elsa becomes friends with Maya (Mirela Naska), whose recent husband is also in prison, and Maya helps Elsa to get a job at a hospital kitchen and a place to live in Tirana. Elsa's increasing independence and relationship with Shpetim creates problems with Remzi. Then a prisoner amnesty where the imprisoned spouses are released early threatens the bond between Elsa and Shpetim.

== Cast ==
- Luli Bitri as Elsa
- Karafil Shena as Shpetim
- Todi Llupi as Remzi
- Mirela Naska as Maya

== Production ==
An international co-production between Albanian, French, and Greek companies Fantasia, Arizona Films Productions, and 90 Productions, Amnesty was directed and written by Bujar Alimani. Elias Adamis was the cinematographer, Bonita Papastathi edited the film, and the music was composed by Hekuran Pere. Alimani was inspired to write the script after seeing a proposed law that would allow conjugal visits.

The National Center of Cinematography declined to support Alimani's film. Alimani went to Eurimages and Amnesty became the first Albanian production to receive financial backing from the organization. Filming was done in Greece and the Albanian cities of Tirana and Pogradec, in 2010, with a €700,000 budget. Additional financial support was provided by the Council of Europe's European Cinema Support Fund.

== Release ==
Amnesty premiered in Albania on 27 May 2011, France on 6 June, and Germany on 29 September. It was the first Albanian film shown at the Berlin International Film Festival.

The National Center of Cinematography selected The Forgiveness of Blood as Albanian's nominee for Academy Award for Best International Feature Film at the 84th Academy Awards. The Forgiveness of Blood was disqualified after Alimani criticized its selection stating that it was a majority American production. Amnesty was selected to replace it, but was not one of the finalists.

== See also ==
- List of Albanian submissions for the Academy Award for Best Foreign Language Film

== Works cited ==
=== News ===
- ""Amnistia" e Bujar Alimanit, premierë në kimenatë e Tiranës". Panorama (Albania). 2 May 2011. Archived from the original on 22 April 2025.
- "Bujar Alimani's Amnesty premiered in Berlinale". Tirana Times. 10 February 2011. Archived from the original on 10 April 2025.
- Holdsworth, Nick (29 September 2011). "Albanian Oscar choice sparks 'Blood' feud". Variety. Archived from the original on 22 April 2025.
- Holdsworth, Nick (18 September 2016). "Oscars: Albania Selects 'Chromium' for Foreign-Language Category". The Hollywood Reporter. Archived from the original on 22 April 2025.
- Holdsworth, Nick (19 September 2019). "Oscars: Albania Selects 'The Delegation' for International Feature Film Category". The Hollywood Reporter. Archived from the original on 22 April 2025.
- Scarpa, Vittoria (26 April 2011). ""Albania seeks the path to Europe"". Cineuropa. Archived from the original on 22 April 2025.
- van Hoeij, Boyd (12 February 2011). "Amnesty". Variety. Archived from the original on 22 April 2025.

=== Web ===
- "Amnesty (Amnistia)". Cineuropa. Archived from the original on 22 April 2025.
