= Gentian Zenelaj =

Albanian actor and comedian (born 1977)

- Born: 20 August 1977 (age 49); Lezhë, PSR Albania
- Occupations: actor, comedian
- Years active: 2003–
- Television: Portokalli (2003–2008); Apartment 2XL (2010–2013); TV Klan (2015–)

Gentian Zenelaj (born 20 August 1977) is an Albanian actor and comedian, best known for his appearances in Portokalli (2003–2008) and Apartment 2XL (2010–2013).

He started his career in 2003 in the show Portokalli with the group ShBLSh, when this group was the most popular sketch in all the shows. After four seasons in Portokalli, the group ShBLSh disbanded and everyone went into their own procupetions.

After three seasons on Apartmenti 2XL, the show was cancelled, but with the same cast, the producer and broadcaster created the Sketch Show Albania. The show aired for two seasons, but it was not successful. Then the show changed again to Apartment 2XL.

Currently, he hosts a satirical investigative show called "Stop" on TV Klan alongside Saimir Kodra since 4 January 2016.

== Filmography ==
Gentian Zenelaj is known for playing in movies. One of the movies that he has played is Time of the Comet (2008).
