= Celebrity Big Brother =

Adaptation of the Big Brother reality television series

Celebrity Big Brother Big Brother VIP
- Original work: Big Brother VIPs (Dutch TV series); Celebrity Big Brother (British TV series)

Films and television
- Television series: Celebrity Big Brother/Big Brother VIP (independent international versions, see below)

Miscellaneous
- Genre: Reality television

Official website
- Big Brother VIPS on Banijay Rights

Celebrity Big Brother or Big Brother VIP is an adaptation of the Big Brother reality television series. It is the celebrity version of its parent franchise Big Brother, the celebrity version airs in several countries, however, the housemates or houseguests are local celebrities. The format of the celebrity version usually keeps the same as the original version. In some countries, the prize money normally awarded to the winning housemate is donated to a charity, and all celebrities are paid to appear in the show as long as they do not voluntarily leave before their eviction or the end of the series. The rest of the rules are nearly the same as those of the original version.

== History ==
The first-ever celebrity version of Big Brother aired in Netherlands on 22 May 2000 with the name of Big Brother VIPs. It's a spin-off of the original Big Brother. The show was pre-recorded with four different groups of well-known Dutch celebrities (knowns as VIPs) entered the house. On 9 March 2001, British broadcaster Channel 4 introduced their first celebrity series Celebrity Big Brother, making it the second country to adopt the celebrity version.

== Popularity ==
The celebrity version has become particularly popular in the UK, causing British broadcaster Channel 5 to extend its deal with Endemol enabling them to air two celebrity series in addition to the civilian version every year from 2012. In total, the UK aired 22 celebrity series with their twenty-second and final series ending on 10 September 2018, Four days later on 14 September 2018, Channel 5 confirmed that they had axed both Big Brother and Celebrity Big Brother. In 2024, a revived version of Celebrity Big Brother began airing in the UK once again, this time broadcast by ITV.

In Bulgaria, VIP Brother has replaced the original format of the show and more seasons of the celebrity edition have been produced than the regular one. Due to the show's popularity there, it lasts for two months unlike most countries where it only airs for a month.

In the Philippines, Pinoy Big Brother: Celebrity Collab Edition gaining the most popularity among any other franchises, because artists from the former rivals, ABS-CBN and GMA Network can interacting each other.

== Versions ==
Currently airing
An upcoming season
Status unknown
No longer airing
Original version

Country/Region	Official name	Network	Series Overview	Presenter(s)
Albania	Big Brother VIP	Top Channel; DigitAlb (live)	1, 2, 3, 4, 5	Arbana Osmani (1–2); Ledion Liço (3–present)
Argentina	Gran Hermano Famosos	Telefe	1	Jorge Rial
Australia	Celebrity Big Brother	Network 10	1	Gretel Killeen
Australia	Big Brother VIP	Channel 7	1	Sonia Kruger
Balkans	Veliki Brat VIP	B92	1, 2, 3, 4, 5	Ana Grubin (1–2); Irina Vukotić (1); Milan Kalinić (2–3); Marijana Mićić (3–5)
Belgium	Big Brother VIPs	VTM 2	1, 2	Walter Grootaers
Bulgaria	VIP Brother	Nova	1, 2, 3, 4, 5, 6, 7, 8, 9, 10	Niki Kanchev (1–10); Aleksandra Sarchadjieva (4–10); Azis (10); Miglena Angelova (9); Dimitar Rachkov (3); Maria Ignatov (3); Evelina Pavlova (1)
Canada (French)	Big Brother Célébrités	Noovo	1, 2, 3, 4, 5	Marie-Mai
Colombia	La casa de los famosos Colombia	Canal RCN; Vix (live, season 1)	1, 2, 3	Carla Giraldo; Cristina Hurtado (1); Marcelo Cezán (2-present)
Croatia	Celebrity Big Brother	RTL	1	Antonija Blaće
Denmark	Big Brother V.I.P.	Kanal 4	1	Lisbeth Janniche
Finland	Julkkis Big Brother	Sub	1	Mari Sainio
Finland	Big Brother VIP	Nelonen	1	Anni Hautala; Tinni Wikström; Kimmo Vehviläinen
Germany	Promi Big Brother	Sat.1	1, 2, 3, 4, 5, 6, 7, 8, 9, 10, 11, 12, 13	Oliver Pocher (1); Cindy aus Marzahn (1); Jochen Schropp (2–present); Jochen Bendel (5); Marlene Lufen (6–present)
Hungary	Big Brother VIP	TV2	1, 2, 3	Claudia Liptai; Attila Till
India (Hindi-language)	Bigg Boss	SET (1); Colors TV (2-present)	1, 2, 3, 4, 5, 6, 7, 8, 9, 10, 11, 12, 13, 14, 15, 16, 17, 18	Arshad Warsi (1); Shilpa Shetty (2); Amitabh Bachchan (3); Salman Khan (4–present); Sanjay Dutt (5)
India (Hindi-language)	Bigg Boss Halla Bol (Spin-off)	SET (1); Colors TV (2-present)	1	Farah Khan
India (Kannada-language)	Bigg Boss Kannada	ETV Kannada (1); Suvarna TV (2); Colors Kannada (3–4; 7); Colors Super (4–6)	1, 2, 3, 4, 5, 6, 7, 8, 9, 10, 11	Sudeep
India (Bengali-language)	Bigg Boss Bangla	ETV Bangla (1); Colors Bangla (2)	1, 2	Mithun Chakraborty (1); Jeet (2)
India (Tamil-language)	Bigg Boss Tamil	Star Vijay	1, 2, 3, 4, 5, 6, 7, 8	Kamal Haasan (1–7); Vijay Sethupathi (8–present)
India (Telugu-language)	Bigg Boss Telugu	Star Maa	1, 2, 3, 4, 5, 6, 7, 8	Jr NRT (1); Nani (2); Nagarjuna (3–present)
India (Marathi-language)	Bigg Boss Marathi	Colors Marathi	1, 2, 3, 4, 5	Mahesh Manjrekar (1–4); Riteish Deshmukh (5–)
India (Malayalam-language)	Bigg Boss Malayalam	Asianet	1, 2, 3, 4, 5, 6	Mohanlal
Israel	HaAh HaGadol VIP	Channel 2 (1-2); Channel 13 (3-present)	1, 2, 3, 4	Erez Tal (1–2); Assi Azar (1–2); Liron Weizman (3–present); Guy Zu-Aretz (3–present)
Italy	Grande Fratello VIP	Canale 5	1, 2, 3, 4, 5, 6, 7, 8, 9	Ilary Blasi (1–3); Alfonso Signorini (4–7)Ilary Blasi (8-present)
Kosovo	Big Brother VIP Kosova	Klan Kosova	1, 2, 3, 4	Alaudin Hamiti; Jonida Vokshi
Mexico	Big Brother VIP	Televisa; Sky México (live)	1, 2, 3.1, 3.2, 4	Víctor Trujillo (1); Verónica Castro (2-4)
Mexico	La casa de los famosos México	Las Estrellas; Canal 5 Vix (live)	1, 2, 3	Galilea Montijo; Diego de Erice; Odalys Ramírez
Netherlands	Big Brother VIPs (Original Edition)	Veronica	1, 2	Unknown
Netherlands	Hotel Big Brother	Talpa	1, 2	Caroline Tensen
Pakistan	Tamasha	ARY Digital; ARY ZAP	1, 2, 3	Adnan Siddiqui
Philippines	Pinoy Big Brother: Celebrity Edition	ABS-CBN (1-2); GMA Network (3-4)	1, 2, 3, 4	Toni Gonzaga (1–2); Luis Manzano (1, 4); Mariel Rodriguez (1–2); Bianca Gonzales (2–4); Beatriz Saw (2); Melai Cantiveros (3–4); Robi Domingo (3–4); Kim Chiu (3–4); Enchong Dee (3–4); Alexa Ilacad (3–4); Gabbi Garcia (3–4); Mavy Legaspi (3–4)
Poland	Big Brother VIP	TV4	1	Kuba Klawiter; Małgorzata Kosik
Portugal	Big Brother Famosos	TVI	1, 2, 4, 5	Teresa Guilherme
Portugal	Big Brother VIP	TVI	3	Teresa Guilherme
Slovenia	Big Brother Slavnih	Pop	1	Nina Osenar
South Africa	Celebrity Big Brother	M-Net	1	Mark Pilgrim
Spain	Gran Hermano VIP	Telecinco	1, 2, 3, 4, 5, 6, 7, 8	Jorge Javier Vázquez (6-present); Jordi González (3-5; 7); Jesús Vázquez (1-2)
Spain	Secret Story	Telecinco	1, 2	Jorge Javier Vázquez; Carlos Sobera
United Kingdom	Celebrity Big Brother	BBC 1 (1); Channel 4 (1–7); Channel 5 (8–22); ITV1 (23–present)	1, 2, 3, 4, 5, 6, 7, 8, 9, 10, 11, 12, 13, 14, 15, 16, 17, 18, 19, 20, 21, 22, 23, 24	Davina McCall (1-7); Brian Dowling (8-12); Emma Willis (13-22); AJ Odudu (23–present); Will Best (23–present)
United States (English)	Celebrity Big Brother	CBS	1, 2, 3	Julie Chen Moonves
United States (Spanish)	La casa de los famosos	Telemundo	1, 2, 3, 4, 6	Jimena Gallego; Héctor Sandarti (1-3); Nacho Lozano (4); Javier Poza (5–present)
United States (Spanish)	La casa de los famosos: All-Stars	Telemundo	5	Jimena Gallego; Héctor Sandarti (1-3); Nacho Lozano (4); Javier Poza (5–present)

== Notes ==
1. The first series of Celebrity Big Brother UK was a collaboration between BBC One and Channel 4 in honour of Comic Relief
2. The series numbers next to certain channels indicate the series numbers aired by them.

== See also ==
- Big Brother (franchise)
