= Big Brother VIP Kosova season 2 =

Big Brother VIP Kosova
- Season 2
- Hosted by: Alaudin Hamiti; Jonida Vokshi
- No. of days: 106
- No. of housemates: 25
- Winner: Lumbardh Salihu
- Runner-up: Blerando
- Companion show: Big Talk Kosova
- No. of episodes: 30 (live shows)

Release
- Original network: Klan Kosova
- Original release: 20 October 2023 – 2 February 2024

Season chronology
- ← Previous; Season 1 Next → Season 3

Big Brother VIP Kosova 2, was the second season of Big Brother VIP Kosova, hosted by Alaudin Hamiti and Jonida Vokshi. The season began airing on 20 October 2023 on Klan Kosova, and ended after 106 days on 3 February 2024.

The viewers were able to watch the whole season live from the house in two live pay-per-view channels, with the name Big Brother VIP Kosova 1 and Big Brother VIP Kosova 2, which are available on the Kosovan TV platform Artmotion, as well as on NimiTV and TVALB for the Kosovo-Albanian diaspora in other countries of Europe, United States and Canada. For the first time, the show was also broadcast in Albania on the TV platform Tring.

Anita Haradinaj returned as opinionist in the prime shows and was joined by Bledi Mane, replacing Olti Curri. Mbresa Hajrullahu, who placed in the 5th place in the first season, was the new host of the spin-off show Big Talk Kosova.

On 3 February 2024, Lumbardh Salihu was announced as the winner of the season, with Blerando as the runner-up.

== Housemates ==
On Day 1, twenty housemates entered the house during launch.

Celebrity	Age on entry	Notability	Place of birth	Day entered	Day exited	Status
Lumbardh Salihu	30	Model and former footballer	Gjilan	1	106	Winner
Blerin "Blerando" Lajçi	24	Musician	Germany	1	106	Runner-up
Shqipe Hysenaj	31	Reality television star	Bellinzona	1	106	3rd place
Edona James	37	Erotic model and reality television star	Suhareka	1	106	4th place
Adri Rogaqi & Iliriana Sadriu	29 & 28	Musicians	Hani i Elezit & Ferizaj	1	99	Evicted
Ardi Gashi & Mirdon Pacolli	27 & 30	Musicians	Pristina & Vushtrri	43	99	Evicted
Santiana Maloku	27	Model	Gjakova	1	99	Evicted
Kader Kicaj	25	Model	Prizren	29	95	Evicted
Ylli "Buci" Dervishi	38	Reality television star	Pristina	1	92	Evicted
Alba Vukaj	22	Social media influencer	Shkodër	1	88	Evicted
Lindita Halimi	34	Musician	Novosella	1	85	Evicted
Visar Dërmaku "Gani Gërmia"	29	Comedian	Kamenica	1	82	Walked
Joana "Alby Rydes" Markaj	32	Former pornographic film actress	Laç	1	78	Evicted
Azem Gagica	27	Social media influencer	Switzerland	1	50	Evicted
Azem Gagica	27	Social media influencer	Switzerland	50	64	Evicted
Besart Zeneli	35	Actor	Pristina	1	60	Evicted
Blerim "Blero" Muharremi	45	Musician	Mitrovica	1	57	Walked
Erida Kadena "Miss Rose"	35	DJ	Tirana	43	57	Evicted
Monika Salihu	39	Musician	Pristina	1	43	Evicted
Vesa Vllasaliu	24	Social media influencer	Gjilan	1	36	Evicted
Dominique Mbarga Ambah	28	Blogger	Yaoundé	15	29	Evicted
Meti Alshiqi	34	Reality television star	Pristina	1	26	Ejected
Ledi Vokshi	39	Musician	Durrës	1	22	Evicted
Brikenda Karrica	23	Reality television star	Gjakova	1	15	Evicted

== Nominations table ==
	Week 2	Week 3	Week 4	Week 5	Week 6	Week 7	Week 8	Week 9		Week 11	Week 12		Week 13		Week 14		Week 15 Final	
	Week 2	Week 3	Week 4	Week 5	Week 6	Week 7	Week 8	Day 57	Day 60	Week 11	Week 12		Day 88		Day 95	Day 99	Week 15 Final	
Lumbardh	Ledi; Adri & Iliriana	Santiana; Gani	Ylli; Santiana	Nominated	No; Nominations	Ylli; Blerando	Blero; Lindita	No; Nominations	No; Nominations	Lindita; Santiana	Kader		No; Nominations	Santiana; Ylli	No; Nominations	No; Nominations	Winner (Day 106)	
Blerando	Meti; Ylli	Santiana; Azem	Blero	Santiana	No; Nominations	Santiana; Lindita	Lumbardh; Edona	No; Nominations	Nominated	No; Nominations	Ardi & Mirdoni		No; Nominations	Lumbardh; Edona	No; Nominations	No; Nominations	Runner-up (Day 106)	
Shqipe	Azem; Blero	Gani; Meti	Blero	Adri & Iliriana	No; Nominations	Blero; Blerando	Santiana; Alba	No; Nominations	No; Nominations	No; Nominations	Nominated		No; Nominations	Blerando; Ylli	No; Nominations	No; Nominations	Third place (Day 106)	
Edona	Santiana; Ylli	Santiana; Gani	Lindita; Ylli	Nominated	No; Nominations	Blero; Ylli	Kader; Lumbardh	No; Nominations	No; Nominations	No; Nominations	Santiana		No; Nominations	Blerando; Ylli	No; Nominations	No; Nominations	Fourth place (Day 106)	
Adri & Iliriana	Meti; Alby	Blerando; Meti	Lindita; Besi	Saved	No; Nominations	Ylli; Blerando	Ardi & Mirdoni; Blerando	No; Nominations	No; Nominations	Ardi & Mirdoni; Ylli	Lumbardh	Nominated	No; Nominations	Ardi & Mirdon; Ylli	No; Nominations	No; Nominations	Evicted (Day 99)	
Ardi & Mirdoni	Not in House					Adri & Iliriana; Kader	Lindita; Lumbardh	No; Nominations	Nominated	Adri & Iliriana; Lindita	Saved		No; Nominations	Adri & Iliriana; Santiana	No; Nominations	No; Nominations	Evicted (Day 99)	
Santiana	Monika; Meti	Blerando; Alby	Monika; Lumbardh	Ylli	No; Nominations	Blerando; Kader	Blerando; Kader	No; Nominations	Nominated	Lindita; Kader	Alba		No; Nominations	Kader; Blerando	No; Nominations	No; Nominations	Evicted (Day 99)	
Kader	Not in House			Exempt	No; Nominations	Lindita; Ylli	Lindita; Ardi & Mirdoni	No; Nominations	No; Nominations	Santiana; Lindita	Edona		No; Nominations	Santiana; Ylli	No; Nominations	Evicted (Day 95)		
Ylli	Ledi; Azem	Blero; Alby	Lumbardh; Alby	Besi	No; Nominations	Santiana; Blerando	Lindita; Blero	Nominated	No; Nominations	Lindita; Shqipe	Nominated		No; Nominations	Adri & Iliriana; Blerando	Evicted (Day 92)			
Alba	Monika; Alby	Lumbardh; Alby	Lindita; Alby	Shqipe	No; Nominations	Blero; Kader	Lumbardh; Kader	No; Nominations	No; Nominations	No; Nominations	Blerando		No; Nominations	Evicted (Day 88)				
Lindita	Ledi; Monika	Meti; Gani	Gani; Azem	Nominated	No; Nominations	Blerando; Kader	Blerando; Kader	No; Nominations	Nominated	Gani; Santiana	Nominated		Evicted (Day 85)					
Gani	Lumbardh; Blero	Blero; Lumbardh	Shqipe; Edona	Azem	No; Nominations	Ylli; Adri & Iliriana	Kader; Lindita	Nominated	No; Nominations	Lindita; Santiana	Walked (Day 82)							
Alby	Ylli; Adri & Iliriana	Ylli; Santiana	Ylli; Lindita	Nominated	No; Nominations	Lindita; Ylli	Santiana; Lindita	No; Nominations	Blerando; Santiana; Lindita	Santiana; Lindita	Evicted (Day 78)							
Azem	Ledi; Lindita	Blerando; Gani	Lindita; Edona	Alba	No; Nominations	Ylli; Blerando	Adri & Iliriana; Ardi & Mirdoni	No; Nominations	Nominated	Evicted (Day 64)								
Besi	Adri & Iliriana; Alby	Shqipe; Meti	Lumbardh; Lindita	Blero	No; Nominations	Blero; Blerando	Lumbardh; Kader	Nominated	Evicted (Day 60)									
Blero	Meti; Ylli	Ylli; Gani	Lindita; Ylli	Gani	No; Nominations	Shqipe; Ylli	Lumbardh; Ylli	Walked (Day 57)										
Miss Rose	Not in House					Gani; Ylli	Adri & Iliriana; Lindita	Evicted (Day 57)										
Monika	Meti; Ylli	Meti; Santiana	Ylli; Santiana	Nominated	No; Nominations	Evicted (Day 43)												
Vesa	Ylli; Meti	Meti; Ylli	Lindita; Meti	Nominated	Evicted (Day 36)													
Dominique	Not in House	Meti; Ylli	Lindita; Monika	Evicted (Day 29)														
Meti	Edona; Santiana	Shqipe; Blerando	Shqipe; Besi	Ejected (Day 26)														
Ledi	Meti; Lindita	Ylli; Meti	Evicted (Day 22)															
Brikenda	Ledi; Monika	Evicted (Day 15)																
Nominated (pre-veto)	none						Shqipe, Gani, Miss Rose, Lindita, Lumbardh, Kader	none										
Veto winner	none						Alba	none										
Against public vote	Blerando; Brikenda; Ledi; Meti; Shqipe; Ylli	Gani; Ledi; Lindita; Meti; Monika; Santiana; Ylli	Adri & Iliriana; Alba; Blero; Dominique; Lindita; Ylli	Alby; Edona; Lindita; Lumbardh; Monika; Vesa	All; Housemates	Alba; Azem; Besi; Ylli; Blerando; Kader; Blero	Shqipe, Gani, Miss Rose, Blero, Lumbardh, Kader	Besi; Gani; Ylli	Azem; Ardi & Mirdoni; Blerando; Santiana; Lindita	Blerando; Alba; Alby; Santiana; Lindita	Adri & Iliriana; Lindita; Shqipe; Ylli		All; Housemates	Ylli; Blerando; Santiana	All; Housemates	All; Housemates	Blerando; Edona; Lumbardh; Shqipe	
Walked	none						Blero	none			Gani		none					
Ejected	none		Meti	none														
Evicted	Brikenda; Fewest votes to save	Ledi; Fewest votes to save	Dominique; Fewest votes to save	Vesa; Fewest votes to save	Monika; Fewest votes to save	Azem; Fewest votes to save	Miss Rose; Fewest votes to save	Besi; Fewest votes to save	Azem; Fewest votes to save	Alby; Fewest votes to save	Lindita; Fewest votes to save		Alba; Most votes to evict	Ylli; Fewest votes to save	Kader; Fewest votes to save	Santiana; Fewest votes to be finalist	Edona; Fewest votes (out of 4)	Shqipe; Fewest votes (out of 3)
Evicted	Brikenda; Fewest votes to save	Ledi; Fewest votes to save	Dominique; Fewest votes to save	Vesa; Fewest votes to save	Monika; Fewest votes to save	Azem; Fewest votes to save	Miss Rose; Fewest votes to save	Besi; Fewest votes to save	Azem; Fewest votes to save	Alby; Fewest votes to save	Lindita; Fewest votes to save		Alba; Most votes to evict	Ylli; Fewest votes to save	Kader; Fewest votes to save	Ardi & Mirdoni; Fewest votes to be finalist	Blerando; Fewest votes (out of 2)	Lumbardh; Most votes to win
Evicted	Brikenda; Fewest votes to save	Ledi; Fewest votes to save	Dominique; Fewest votes to save	Vesa; Fewest votes to save	Monika; Fewest votes to save	Azem; Fewest votes to save	Miss Rose; Fewest votes to save	Besi; Fewest votes to save	Azem; Fewest votes to save	Alby; Fewest votes to save	Lindita; Fewest votes to save		Alba; Most votes to evict	Ylli; Fewest votes to save	Kader; Fewest votes to save	Adri & Iliriana; Fewest votes to be finalist	Blerando; Fewest votes (out of 2)	Lumbardh; Most votes to win
