= Big Brother VIP Kosova season 5 =

Big Brother VIP Kosova
- Season 5
- Hosted by: Alaudin Hamiti; Jonida Vokshi
- No. of housemates: 23
- Companion show: Big Talk Kosova
- No. of episodes: 1 (live shows)

Release
- Original network: Klan Kosova
- Original release: 30 October 2026 – present

Additional information
- Filming dates: 29 October 2026 – present

Season chronology
- ← Previous; Season 4

Big Brother VIP Kosova 5, is the fifth season of Big Brother VIP Kosova, once again hosted by Alaudin Hamiti and Jonida Vokshi. The season began airing on 30 October 2026 on Klan Kosova.

The viewers were able to watch the whole season live from the house in two live pay-per-view channels, Big Brother VIP Kosova 1 and Big Brother VIP Kosova 2, available on the Kosovan TV platform Artmotion. For the Kosovo-Albanian diaspora, the live feed was distributed via NimiTV, which serves audiences across Europe, and TVALB, which provides access for viewers in the United States and Canada. The show is also broadcast in Albania on the TV platform Tring and DigitAlb, which also broadcasts the Albanian version Big Brother VIP.

Rudina Dembacaj and Resul Sinani were the new opinionists, replacing Olta Gixhari and Leonora Jakupi.

== Production ==
In August 2026, producer Olsa Muhameti confirmed that preparations for the fifth season were underway and expressed hope that the season would premiere earlier than the previous one, potentially in October. On 23 October 2026, it was officially confirmed that the fifth season would premiere on 30 October 2026.

Jonida Vokshi had previously announced that she would not return as a presenter after four seasons, citing her desire to spend more time with her family and pursue other projects. However, during the premiere show, she returned as co-host alongside Alaudin Hamiti for the fifth season.

Actress Rudina Dembacaj and journalist and television presenter Resul Sinani joined the programme as opinionists.

== Housemates ==
For the first time in the show's history, three housemates entered the Big Brother house on 29 October 2026, one day before the official premiere. The first three housemates were Arlinda Morina, Nichi and Antoneta Koçi. A total of 21 housemates were introduced during the season's launch.

Celebrity	Age on entry	Notability	Day entered	Day exited	Status
Adrian Kalanderi	31	Personal trainer	2		Participating
Akil Varfi	28	Actor & comedian	2		Participating
Anjeza Gubetini	22	Television presenter	2		Participating
Antoneta Koçi	33	Reality TV star & television presenter	1		Participating
Arlinda "Liki" Morina	43	Film director	1		Participating
Daors Bejta	30	Singer	2		Participating
Edita Abazi		Make-up artist	16		Participating
Erik Briko	33	Personal trainer	16		Participating
Fatlum Dreshaj	26	Professional boxer	2		Participating
Ensar "Fuego" Elshani	26	Rapper	2		Participating
Fatjona Krasniqi	31	Activist	2		Participating
Kledja Muçaj	26	Fashion designer	2		Participating
Bleon "Nichi" Krasniqi	23	Rapper	1		Participating
Nora Tushi	26	Singer	2		Participating
Sharr Braina	26	Singer	2		Participating
Shqiponja Mustafaj	26	Social media personality	2		Participating
Valdet Haziri	29	Social media personality	2		Participating
Vjollca Haxhiu	52	Singer	2		Participating
Zoja Nushi		Journalist	2		Participating
Olga "Olechka" Grigorieva	24	Social media personality	2	19	Evicted
Rron Isufi	20	Personal trainer	2	16	Evicted
Behare Maksutaj	29	Former Miss Albania	2	13	Walked
Dion Mala	22	Model	2	9	Evicted

== Nominations table ==
	Week 1	Week 2		Week 3		Week 4	Week 5	Week 6	Week 7	Week 8	Week 9	Week 10	Week 11	Week 12	Week 13	Week 14 Final
	Week 1	Day 12	Day 16	Day 19		Week 4	Week 5	Week 6	Week 7	Week 8	Week 9	Week 10	Week 11	Week 12	Week 13	Week 14 Final
Viewers’ Favorite	none	Nichi	none	Nichi												
Viewers’ least Favorite	none	Fatlum	none	Olechka	Valdet											
Adrian	Rron, Zoja	Kledja, Olechka	Nominated	Nominated	Shqiponja, Akil											
Akil	Arlinda, Zoja	Behare, Valdet	Nominated	Nominated	Adrian, Bejta											
Anjeza	Shqiponja, Adrian	Adrian, Olechka	Nominated	Nominated	Fatlum, Bejta											
Antoneta	Arlinda, Fatlum	Shqiponja, Behare	Nominated	Nominated	Bejta, Arlinda											
Arlinda	Akil, Antoneta	Olechka, Behare	Nominated	Nominated	Fatlum, Adrian											
Bejta	Nichi, Sharr	Akil, Adrian	Nominated	Nominated	Adrian, Jona, Akil											
Edita	Not in House			Nominated	Akil, Jona											
Erik	Not in House			Nominated	Kledja, Shqiponja											
Fatlum	Zoja, Antoneta	Akil, Nichi	Nominated	Nominated	Jona, Arlinda											
Fuego	Arlinda, Akil	Valdet, Nichi	Nominated	Nominated	Fatlum, Adrian											
Jona	Dion, Akil	Adrian, Behare	Nominated	Nominated	Adrian, Fatlum											
Kledja	Arlinda, Akil	Behare, Adrian	Nominated	Nominated	Adrian, Jona											
Nichi	Adrian, Olechka	Olechka, Arlinda	Nominated	Nominated	Fatlum, Arlinda											
Nora	Zoja, Kledja	Behare, Adrian	Nominated	Nominated	Shqiponja, Adrian											
Sharr	Arlinda, Nichi	Zoja, Akil	Nominated	Nominated	Akil, Zoja											
Shqiponja	Akil, Dion	Adrian, Behare	Nominated	Nominated	Kledja, Fatlum											
Valdet	Behare, Arlinda	Akil, Kledja	Nominated	Nominated	Antoneta, Jona											
Vjollca	Akil, Arlinda	Arlinda, Bejta	Nominated	Nominated	Arlinda, Adrian											
Zoja	Fuego, Adrian	Nora, Jona	Nominated	Nominated	Adrian, Fatlum											
Olechka	Zoja, Nichi	Nichi, Akil	Nominated	Nominated	Evicted (Day 19)											
Rron	Shqiponja, Zoja	Adrian, Akil	Nominated	Evicted (Day 16)												
Behare	Zoja, Shqiponja	Arlinda, Zoja	Walked (Day 13)													
Dion	Nichi, Antoneta	Evicted (Day 9)														
Notes	1	1, 2	3	4	1, 4, 5, 6											
Against public vote	Adrian, Akil, Anjeza, Antoneta, Arlinda, Dion, Nichi, Shqiponja, Zoja	Adrian, Akil, Anjeza, Behare, Fatlum, Olechka	All housemates	All housemates	Adrian, Akil, Anjeza, Fatlum, Jona, Valdet											
Walked	none	Behare	none													
Evicted	Dion; Fewest votes to save	Eviction cancelled	Rron; Fewest votes to save	Olechka; Fewest votes to save												

=== Notes ===
- ^Note 1: The three housemates who entered on Day 1 - Antoneta, Arlinda and Nichi - had to nominate three housemates who they wished to see nominated for every eviction. They chose Anjeza, Dion and Zoja. On Day 5, the public chose Anjeza to face every eviction.
- ^Note 2: On Day 12, the public voted for their favourite housemate. Nichi received the most votes, and Fatlum received the least votes. As a result of being voted the least favourite, Fatlum was automatically nominated for the upcoming eviction.
- ^Note 3: Due to Behare leaving the competition, the original eviction for Day 16 was cancelled. On Day 16, Big Brother decided to put all housemates up for eviction.
- ^Note 4: On Day 19, the public voted for their favourite housemate. The housemate with the fewest votes, Olechka, was evicted from the house, and the housemate with the second fewest votes, Valdet, was automatically nominated for the upcoming eviction.
- ^Note 5: As the newest housemates, Edita and Erik were immune.
- ^Note 6: For winning a task, Bejta was made House Captain for the week. Big Brother also granted him the right to nominate an additional housemate for eviction following regular nominations; he chose Akil.
