= Big Brother VIP Kosova season 1 =

Big Brother VIP Kosova
- Season 1
- Hosted by: Alaudin Hamiti; Jonida Vokshi
- No. of days: 102
- No. of housemates: 26
- Winner: Stresi
- Runner-up: Vedat Bajrami
- Companion show: Big Talk Kosova
- No. of episodes: 29 (live shows)

Release
- Original network: Klan Kosova
- Original release: 5 December 2022 – 17 March 2023

Season chronology
- Next → Season 2

Big Brother VIP Kosova 1, was the first season of Big Brother VIP Kosova, hosted by Alaudin Hamiti and Jonida Vokshi. The season began airing on 5 December 2022 on Klan Kosova, and ended after 102 days on 17 March 2023.

The viewers were able to watch the whole season live from the house in two live pay-per-view channels, with the name Big Brother VIP Kosova 1 and Big Brother VIP Kosova 2, on the Kosovan TV platform Artmotion, as well as on NimiTV and TVALB for the Kosovo-Albanian diaspora in other countries of Europe, United States and Canada.

The opinionists in the prime shows, were Olti Curri, Afërdita Paqarada, who was until the 14th prime show, and Anita Haradinaj, who was from the 15th prime show until the final. Elita Rudi hosted the spin-off show Big Talk Kosova.

On 17 March 2023, Stresi was announced as the winner of the season, who won a €200,000 prize, with Vedat Bajrami as the runner-up.

== Housemates ==
On Day 1, fourteen housemates entered the house during launch.

Celebrity	Age on entry	Notability	Place of birth	Day entered	Day exited	Status
Arkimed "Stresi" Lushaj	36	Rapper	Tropojë	1	102	Winner
Vedat Bajrami	42	Comedian	Pristina	50	102	Runner-up
Juliana Nura	34	Model and fitness trainer	Skenderaj	1	102	3rd place
Artan Thaqi	35	Comedian	Pristina	1	102	4th place
Mbresa Hajrullahu	24	Musician	Ferizaj	36	102	5th place
Gresa Hoti	25	Model	Genoa	1	54	Evicted
Gresa Hoti	25	Model	Genoa	54	95	Evicted
Bruno Pollogati	32	Musician	Vlorë	47	95	Evicted
Andi Artani	26	Reality television star and former judoka	Brooklyn	1	92	Evicted
Melisa Lleshi	25	Reality television star	Laç	54	89	Evicted
Lorik "Blasta" Shaqiri	29	Musician	Ferizaj	47	82	Walked
Arta Selimi	39	Actress	Pristina	1	82	Evicted
Dafina Dauti	39	Musician	Skenderaj	54	75	Evicted
Vivien Thano	29	Reality television star	Durrës	1	68	Evicted
Atdhe Xharavina	29	Reality television star	Gjakova	47	65	Evicted
Himena Sherifi	23	Musician	Podujevë	47	62	Evicted
Ganimete Abazi	45	Musician	Pristina	36	50	Evicted
Fisnik "Fis" Juniku	33	Basketball player and television presenter	Pristina	33	47	Evicted
Gjon "Lugati" Karrica	38	Musician	Gjakova	1	45	Walked
Getoar "Getinjo" Aliu	31	Rapper	Ferizaj	1	43	Walked
Ana Kabashi	32	Musician	Peja	1	40	Evicted
Edon Shileku	25	Drag artist and actor	Pristina	1	33	Evicted
Shota Baraliu	40	Actress and musician	Suhareka	1	29	Evicted
Gigliola Haveriku	30	Musician	Foggia	5	19	Evicted
Bekim "MC Beka" Latifi	49	Rapper	Pristina	1	19	Evicted
Urim Çela & Alisa Maloku	23 & 20	Social media influencers	Austria & Belgium	1	12	Evicted

== Nominations table ==
	Week 2	Week 3		Week 4	Week 5	Week 6	Week 7		Week 8	Week 9		Week 10	Week 11	Week 12	Week 13		Week 14	Week 15 Final	
	Week 2	Day 15	Day 19	Week 4	Week 5	Week 6	Day 43	Day 50	Week 8	Day 57	Day 64	Week 10	Week 11	Week 12	Day 85	Day 89	Week 14	Week 15 Final	
Head of Household	Ana, Artan	MC Beka, Gigliola		Arta	none														
Stresi	Shota, Ana	Juliana, Vivien	No; Nominations	Vivien, Juliana	Ana, Vivien	Ana, Arta	Artan, Arta	No; Nominations	Juliana, Andi	Bruno	No; Nominations	Mbresa, Juliana	Artan, Blasta	Arta, Gresa, Mbresa	Artan, Melisa	No; Nominations	No; Nominations	Winner (Day 102)	
Vedat	Not in House								Exempt	Nominated	No; Nominations	Andi, Stresi	Andi, Stresi	Stresi, Juliana	Melisa, Andi	No; Nominations	No; Nominations	Runner-up (Day 102)	
Juliana	Vivien, Stresi	Lugati, Shota	No; Nominations	Stresi, Andi	Lugati, Vivien	Andi, Gresa	Lugati, Vivien	No; Nominations	Vivien, Mbresa	Saved	No; Nominations	Andi, Gresa	Arta, Melisa	Artan, Vedat, Andi	Andi, Vedat	No; Nominations	No; Nominations	Third place (Day 102)	
Artan	Getinjo, Vivien	Lugati, Shota	No; Nominations	Lugati, Edon	Lugati, Stresi	Ana, Stresi	Mbresa, Lugati	No; Nominations	Gresa, Mbresa	Juliana	No; Nominations	Juliana, Mbresa	Stresi, Andi	Stresi, Juliana	Melisa, Bruno	No; Nominations	No; Nominations	Fourth place (Day 102)	
Mbresa	Not in House						Arta, Andi	No; Nominations	Vivien, Arta	Nominated	No; Nominations	Arta, Artan	Arta, Artan	Vedat, Andi	Vedat, Artan	Nominated	No; Nominations	Fifth place (Day 102)	
Gresa	Juliana, MC Beka	MC Beka, Gigliola	No; Nominations	Shota, Juliana	Lugati, Edon	Juliana, Getinjo	Juliana, Mbresa	No; Nominations	Juliana, Mbresa	Vivien	No; Nominations	Juliana, Mbresa	Stresi, Arta	Mbresa, Vedat	Vedat, Melisa	Nominated	No; Nominations	Evicted (Day 96)	
Bruno	Not in House							Exempt	Mbresa, Gresa	Artan	No; Nominations	Mbresa, Blasta	Blasta, Melisa	Mbresa, Gresa	Artan, Melisa	Nominated	No; Nominations	Evicted (Day 96)	
Andi	Lugati	Juliana, Lugati	No; Nominations	Vivien, Arta	Lugati, Edon	Juliana, Ana	Mbresa, Juliana	No; Nominations	Juliana, Mbresa	Exempt	No; Nominations	Mbresa, Bruno	Bruno, Dafina	Mbresa, Melisa	Artan, Melisa	Nominated	Evicted (Day 92)		
Melisa	Not in House									Exempt	No; Nominations	Juliana, Mbresa	Bruno, Andi	Vedat, Gresa	Vedat, Gresa	Evicted (Day 89)			
Blasta	Not in House							Exempt	Gresa, Andi	Nominated	No; Nominations	Juliana, Stresi	Dafina, Melisa	Vedat, Andi	Walked (Day 82)				
Arta	MC Beka, Urim & Alisa	Gigliola, Ana	No; Nominations	Andi, Shota, Stresi	Lugati, Stresi	Vivien, Getinjo	Mbresa, Lugati	No; Nominations	Artan, Juliana	Nominated	No; Nominations	Melisa, Bruno	Artan, Dafina	Juliana, Stresi	Evicted (Day 82)				
Dafina	Not in House									Exempt	Nominated	Juliana, Mbresa	Arta, Artan	Evicted (Day 75)					
Vivien	Urim & Alisa, MC Beka	Stresi, MC Beka	No; Nominations	Shota, Lugati	Lugati, Gresa	Stresi, Juliana	Andi, Mbresa	No; Nominations	Juliana, Mbresa	Stresi	Nominated	Juliana, Mbresa	Evicted (Day 68)						
Atdhe	Not in House							Exempt	Vivien, Mbresa	Nominated	Nominated	Evicted (Day 65)							
Himena	Not in House							Exempt	Juliana, Arta	Nominated	Evicted (Day 62)								
Ganja	Not in House						Mbresa, Andi	No; Nominations	Evicted (Day 50)										
Fis	Not in House					Andi, Vivien	Mbresa, Ganja	Evicted (Day 47)											
Lugati	Ana, MC Beka	MC Beka, Ana	No; Nominations	Artan, Andi	Artan, Vivien	Arta, Juliana	Arta, Artan	Walked (Day 45)											
Getinjo	Juliana, Urim & Alisa	Shota, Juliana	No; Nominations	Gresa, Vivien	Lugati, Edon	Juliana, Arta	Walked (Day 43)												
Ana	Shota, Juliana	Shota, Arta	No; Nominations	Vivien, Juliana	Lugati, Vivien	Stresi, Vivien	Evicted (Day 40)												
Edon	Urim & Alisa, Shota	MC Beka, Artan	No; Nominations	Vivien, Gresa	Artan, Vivien	Evicted (Day 33)													
Shota	MC Beka, Ana	Ana, Juliana	No; Nominations	Vivien, Ana	Evicted (Day 29)														
Gigliola	Shota	Arta, Lugati	No; Nominations	Evicted (Day 19)															
MC Beka	Vivien, Arta	Lugati, Andi	Evicted (Day 19)																
Urim & Alisa	Juliana, MC Beka	Evicted (Day 12)																	
Nominated (pre-veto)	none											Andi, Bruno, Dafina, Juliana, Mbresa, Stresi, Vivien	none						
Veto winner	none											Bruno	none						
Against public vote	Artan, MC Beka, Juliana, Lugati, Shota, Urim & Alisa	MC Beka, Juliana, Lugati, Shota	All; Housemates	Andi, Juliana, Shota, Stresi, Vivien	Andi, Edon, Lugati, Vivien	Ana, Arta, Artan, Juliana, Stresi, Vivien	Andi, Arta, Fis, Gresa, Lugati, Mbresa, Stresi	All; Housemates	Gresa, Juliana, Mbresa, Stresi	Arta, Atdhe, Blasta, Himena, Mbresa, Vedat	Atdhe, Dafina, Vivien	Andi, Dafina, Juliana, Mbresa, Stresi, Vedat, Vivien	Andi, Arta, Artan, Dafina, Juliana, Mbresa, Melisa, Stresi	Arta, Artan, Bruno, Mbresa, Vedat	Artan, Juliana, Mbresa, Melisa, Stresi, Vedat	Andi, Bruno, Gresa, Mbresa	All; Housemates	Artan, Juliana, Mbresa, Stresi, Vedat	
Walked	none						Getinjo	Lugati	none					Blasta	none				
Evicted	Urim & Alisa; Fewest votes to save	MC Beka; Fewest votes to save	Gigliola; Fewest votes to save	Shota; Fewest votes to save	Edon; Fewest votes to save	Ana; Fewest votes to save	Fis; Fewest votes to save	Ganja; Fewest votes to save	Gresa; Fewest votes to save	Himena; Fewest votes to save	Atdhe; Most votes to evict	Vivien; Fewest votes to save	Dafina; Fewest votes to save	Arta; Fewest votes to save	Melisa; Fewest votes to save	Andi; Most votes to evict	Bruno; Fewest votes to be finalist	Mbresa; Fewest votes (out of 5)	Artan; Fewest votes (out of 4)
Evicted	Urim & Alisa; Fewest votes to save	MC Beka; Fewest votes to save	Gigliola; Fewest votes to save	Shota; Fewest votes to save	Edon; Fewest votes to save	Ana; Fewest votes to save	Fis; Fewest votes to save	Ganja; Fewest votes to save	Gresa; Fewest votes to save	Himena; Fewest votes to save	Atdhe; Most votes to evict	Vivien; Fewest votes to save	Dafina; Fewest votes to save	Arta; Fewest votes to save	Melisa; Fewest votes to save	Andi; Most votes to evict	Bruno; Fewest votes to be finalist	Juliana; Fewest votes (out of 3)	Vedat; Fewest votes (out of 2)
Evicted	Urim & Alisa; Fewest votes to save	MC Beka; Fewest votes to save	Gigliola; Fewest votes to save	Shota; Fewest votes to save	Edon; Fewest votes to save	Ana; Fewest votes to save	Fis; Fewest votes to save	Ganja; Fewest votes to save	Gresa; Fewest votes to save	Himena; Fewest votes to save	Atdhe; Most votes to evict	Vivien; Fewest votes to save	Dafina; Fewest votes to save	Arta; Fewest votes to save	Melisa; Fewest votes to save	Andi; Most votes to evict	Gresa; Fewest votes to be finalist	Juliana; Fewest votes (out of 3)	Vedat; Fewest votes (out of 2)
Evicted	Urim & Alisa; Fewest votes to save	MC Beka; Fewest votes to save	Gigliola; Fewest votes to save	Shota; Fewest votes to save	Edon; Fewest votes to save	Ana; Fewest votes to save	Fis; Fewest votes to save	Ganja; Fewest votes to save	Gresa; Fewest votes to save	Himena; Fewest votes to save	Atdhe; Most votes to evict	Vivien; Fewest votes to save	Dafina; Fewest votes to save	Arta; Fewest votes to save	Melisa; Fewest votes to save	Andi; Most votes to evict	Gresa; Fewest votes to be finalist	Stresi; Most votes to win	
