= Celebrity Big Brother 1 =

Celebrity Big Brother 1 may refer to:

- Celebrity Big Brother (British TV series) series 1, the 2001 British series of Celebrity Big Brother
- Celebrity Big Brother 1 (American season), the 2018 American season of Celebrity Big Brother
- Celebrity Big Brother, the 2002 celebrity edition of Big Brother Australia
- Celebrity Big Brother (Croatian TV series), the 2008 Croatian series of Celebrity Big Brother
- Celebrity Big Brother (South African TV series), the 2002 South African series of Celebrity Big Brother
- Big Brother Famosos 1, the 2002 series of Big Brother Famosos, the version of Celebrity Big Brother in Portugal
- Big Brother VIP, the upcoming 2019 celebrity edition of Big Brother in Albania and Kosovo
- Big Brother V.I.P., the 2003 celebrity edition of Big Brother in Denmark
- Big Brother VIP, the 2003 celebrity edition of Big Brother in Hungary
- Big Brother VIP 1, the 2002 celebrity edition of Big Brother in Mexico
- Big Brother VIP, the 2008 celebrity edition of Big Brother in Poland
- Big Brother VIPs, the 2001 celebrity edition of Big Brother in Belgium
- Big Brother VIPs, the 2000 celebrity edition of Big Brother in the Netherlands
- Big Brother Slavnih, the 2010 celebrity edition of Big Brother in Slovenia
- Bigg Boss (India):
  - Bigg Boss (Hindi TV series) season 1, the 2006-2007 Hindi season of Bigg Boss, the Indian version of Big Brother
  - Bigg Boss Kannada 1, the 2013 Kannada season of Bigg Boss, the Indian version of Big Brother
  - Bigg Boss Bangla 1, the 2013 Bengali season of Bigg Boss, the Indian version of Big Brother
  - Bigg Boss Tamil 1, the 2017 Tamil season of Bigg Boss, the Indian version of Big Brother
  - Bigg Boss Telugu 1, the 2017 Telugu season of Bigg Boss, the Indian version of Big Brother
  - Bigg Boss Marathi 1, the 2018 Marathi season of Bigg Boss, the Indian version of Big Brother
  - Bigg Boss Malayalam 1, the 2018 Malayalam season of Bigg Boss, the Indian version of Big Brother
- Gran Hermano Famosos, the 2007 celebrity edition of Gran Hermano, the version of Big Brother in Argentina
- Gran Hermano VIP 1, the 2005 VIP edition of Gran Hermano, the version of Big Brother in Spain
- Grande Fratello VIP 1, the 2017 VIP edition of Grande Fratello, the version of Big Brother in Italy
- HaAh HaGadol VIP 1, the 2009 VIP edition of HaAh HaGadol, the Israeli version of Big Brother
- Julkkis Big Brother, the 2013 celebrity edition of Big Brother in Finland
- Pinoy Big Brother: Celebrity Edition, the 2006 celebrity season of Big Brother in the Philippines
- Promi Big Brother 1, the 2013 celebrity season of Big Brother in Germany
- Veliki Brat VIP 1, the 2007 celebrity season of Veliki Brat, the version of Big Brother in Serbia, Macedonia, and Bosnia and Herzegovina
- VIP Brother season 1, the 2006 edition of Big Brother VIP in Bulgaria

== See also ==
- Celebrity Big Brother
