= Big Brother VIP Kosova season 4 =

Big Brother VIP Kosova
- Season 4
- Hosted by: Alaudin Hamiti; Jonida Vokshi
- No. of days: 103
- No. of housemates: 27
- Winner: Londrim Mekaj
- Runner-up: Elijona Binakaj
- Companion show: Big Talk Kosova
- No. of episodes: 29 (live shows)

Release
- Original network: Klan Kosova
- Original release: 17 November 2025 – 27 February 2026

Season chronology
- ← Previous; Season 3

Big Brother VIP Kosova 4, is the fourth season of Big Brother VIP Kosova, once again hosted by Alaudin Hamiti and Jonida Vokshi. The season began airing on 17 November 2025 on Klan Kosova.

The viewers were able to watch the whole season live from the house in two live pay-per-view channels, Big Brother VIP Kosova 1 and Big Brother VIP Kosova 2, available on the Kosovan TV platform Artmotion. For the Kosovo-Albanian diaspora, the live feed was distributed via NimiTV, which serves audiences across Europe, and TVALB, which provides access for viewers in the United States and Canada. The show is also broadcast in Albania on the TV platform Tring and DigitAlb, which also broadcasts the Albanian version Big Brother VIP.

Olta Gixhari returned as opinionist in the live shows and was joined by Leonora Jakupi, replacing Milaim Zeka. On several occasions, Valdrin Sahiti replaced Gixhari or Jakupi whenever one was temporarily away. Diellza Daka returned as the host of the fourth season of the spin-off show Big Talk Kosova, marking her second time in this role.

== Production ==
In June 2025, presenter Alaudin Hamiti and executive producer Olsa Muhameti, announced that the show will return with the fourth season. Early speculation suggested that the season would begin airing on 31 October 2025, while other outlets reported potential launch dates of 3 November or 7 November 2025, following a comment made by host Alaudin Hamiti in a viral video clip. Later sources indicated that the premiere had been postponed until mid to late November 2025, possibly due to production adjustments and the timing of the Kosovan local elections.

There were rumors that Jonida Vokshi might not return as the presenter for the fourth season, but according to promotional material from the production, she will host alongside Alaudin Hamiti for the fourth time. Several media outlets speculated on potential opinionists for the fourth season. Among the frequently mentioned names were Leonora Jakupi, Valdrin Sahiti, Milaim Zeka and Olta Gixhari. Reports also suggested that Dalina Buzi would serve as a opinionist, but in November 2025 she denied these reports, confirming that she would not participate in the season. Rumors suggested that the fourth season of Big Brother VIP Kosova may introduce a new panel format, replacing the usual male–female duo with two female opinionists.

During the live launch of the show, it was announced that Olta Gixhari would return for her second season as an opinionist, and that she would be joined by singer and songwriter Leonora Jakupi.

== Housemates ==
Celebrity	Age on entry	Notability	Day entered	Day exited	Status
Londrim Mekaj	24	Singer	1	103	Winner
Elijona Binakaj	18	Model	1	103	Runner-up
Ludovik "Ludo Lee" Tunaj	42	Fashion designer and hair stylist	29	103	3rd place
Klodian Mihaj	27	Reality TV star	1	103	4th place
Hygerta Sako	48	TV presenter and former model	1	103	5th place
Benita Zena	21	Singer	1	96	Evicted
Dolce Dona	31	Influencer	1	96	Evicted
Aurora & Suanita Rusta	22 & 34	Influencer & Singer	54	96	Evicted
Ardit Stafaj	45	Singer	1	68	Evicted
Ardit Stafaj	45	Singer	68	92	Evicted
Labinot Rexha	42	Singer	8	89	Evicted
Alba Pollozhani	29	Reality TV star	1	82	Walked
Kushtrim Kelani	28	Singer	1	82	Evicted
Blerim "Lim" Hoti	32	Director and singer	54	76	Walked
Labinot Haxhiu	28	Influencer	19	75	Evicted
Bia Khalifa	24	OnlyFans content creator	1	61	Evicted
Artan "Toney" Misini	33	Director	1	33	Evicted
Artan "Toney" Misini	33	Director	36	54	Evicted
Fjolla Morina	39	Singer	22	50	Walked
Eduard Kuçi	25	Reality TV star	1	50	Evicted
Saranda "Sasa" Hoda	34	Politician and journalist	1	47	Walked
Shkurta Haxhiu	34	Activist and painter	1	40	Evicted
Jasmin Kadriu	28	Reality TV star	26	40	Evicted
Ibro Deli	27	Singer	1	26	Evicted
Nailir Piri	34	Podcaster	1	19	Evicted
Getoar Halili	36	Bodybuilder and spiritualist	1	12	Evicted
Linda Rei	37	Make-up artist	1	8	Walked
Mentor Haziri	45	Singer	1	2	Walked

== Format ==
=== Housemate exchanges ===
It was announced that, for the first time, the Kosovan version would hold a housemate exchange with another country. It was revealed that the exchange would be with the Italian version, Grande Fratello, which is currently broadcasting its nineteenth season. On Day 12, it was announced that Dolce would enter the Grande Fratello house. She left the house on the same day, and on Day 15 she entered Grande Fratello.

=== Round Trip Ticket ===
Like in the last seasons, the housemates would have the Round Trip Ticket, which would allow the Housemates who picked it to re-enter the house immediately following eviction. Envelopes could only be opened by a Housemate following their eviction. If a Housemate opened their envelope prior to their eviction, their card would be voided. On Day 12, the housemates received their tickets.

== Nominations table ==
	Week 1	Week 2	Week 3	Week 4	Week 5	Week 6		Week 7	Week 8		Week 9	Week 10	Week 11	Week 12	Week 13			Week 14		Week 15 Final	
	Week 1	Week 2	Week 3	Week 4	Week 5	Day 36	Day 40	Week 7	Day 50	Day 54	Week 9	Week 10	Week 11	Week 12	Day 85	Day 89		Day 92		Week 15 Final	
Head(s) of Household	none		Londrim	Elijona	Bia	Labinot R.		Londrim	Toney		Elijona	Lim	Dolce	Ardit	Benita, Londrim			Klodian		none	
Viewers’ Favorite	none		Londrim	none	Elijona	none															
Viewers’ least Favorite	none		Hygerta	Ibro, Sasa	Toney, Kushtrim	none															
Londrim	Exempt	Getoar, Linda	Ibro, Nailir	Labinot R., Alba	Ardit, Labinot H.	Nominated	No; Nominations	Bia, Ardit	No; Nominations	No; Nominations	Hygerta, Ardit	Hygerta, Ardit	Benita, Ludovik	Labinot R., Ludovik	No; Nominations	No; Nominations	Nominated	Nominated	Nominated	Winner (Day 103)	
Elijona	Nominated	Shkurta, Nailir	Labinot R., Kushtrim	Labinot R., Alba	Labinot R., Benita	Nominated	No; Nominations	Labinot R., Bia	No; Nominations	No; Nominations	Ardit, Ludovik	Hygerta, Labinot H.	Labinot H., Dolce	Ludovik, Labinot R.	No; Nominations	No; Nominations	Nominated	Exempt		Runner-up (Day 103)	
Ludovik	Not in House				Exempt	Nominated	No; Nominations	Kushtrim, Sasa	No; Nominations	No; Nominations	Ardit, Labinot H.	Hygerta, Dolce	Labinot H., Kushtrim	Labinot R., Kushtrim	Nominated	Exempt				Third place (Day 103)	
Klodian	Nominated	Linda, Eduard	Shkurta, Ibro	Shkurta, Labinot R.	Labinot R., Bia	Nominated	No; Nominations	Bia, Alba	No; Nominations	No; Nominations	Ardit, Ludovik	Ardit, Ludovik	Aurora & Suanita, Ludovik	Ludovik, Aurora & Suanita	Nominated	No; Nominations	No; Nominations	Nominated	Nominated	Fourth place (Day 103)	
Hygerta	Nominated	Eduard, Bia	Shkurta, Nailir	Alba, Shkurta	Shkurta, Labinot H.	Nominated	No; Nominations	Ardit, Bia	No; Nominations	No; Nominations	Ludovik, Ardit	Labinot H., Ludovik	Labinot H., Aurora & Suanita	Kushtrim, Ardit	No; Nominations	No; Nominations	Nominated	Nominated	Nominated	Fifth place (Day 103)	
Benita	Nominated	Getoar, Nailir	Bia, Ibro	Labinot R., Bia	Labinot H., Dolce	Nominated	Nominated	Alba, Bia	No; Nominations	No; Nominations	Ardit, Labinot H.	Alba, Labinot H.	Aurora & Suanita, Labinot H.	Kushtrim, Aurora & Suanita	Nominated	No; Nominations	No; Nominations	Nominated	Nominated	Evicted (Day 96)	
Dolce	Nominated	Nailir, Klodian	In Italy; House	Toney, Shkurta	Bia, Shkurta	Nominated	Nominated	Alba, Bia	No; Nominations	No; Nominations	Ardit, Ludovik	Labinot R., Alba	Elijona, Labinot R.	Labinot R., Hygerta	Nominated	No; Nominations	No; Nominations	Nominated	Nominated	Evicted (Day 96)	
Aurora & Suanita	Not in House										Hygerta, Ardit	Labinot H., Labinot R.	Labinot R., Klodian	Labinot R., Alba	No; Nominations	No; Nominations	Nominated	Nominated	Nominated	Evicted (Day 96)	
Ardit	Nominated	Shkurta, Toney	Labinot R., Alba	Labinot R., Shkurta	Labinot R., Alba	Nominated	No; Nominations	Fjolla, Alba	No; Nominations	Nominated	Ludovik, Labinot R.	Labinot H., Alba	Labinot H., Kushtrim	Labinot R., Ludovik	No; Nominations	No; Nominations	Nominated	Nominated	Evicted (Day 92)		
Labinot R.	Not in House	Exempt	Ibro, Sasa	Klodian, Londrim	Dolce, Labinot H.	Nominated	Nominated	Labinot H., Sasa	No; Nominations	Nominated	Klodian, Hygerta	Aurora & Suanita, Dolce	Dolce, Aurora & Suanita	Kushtrim, Aurora & Suanita	Nominated	Nominated	Evicted (Day 89)				
Alba	Nominated	Sasa, Toney	Labinot R., Sasa	Labinot R., Bia	Labinot R., Bia	Nominated	Nominated	Kushtrim, Labinot H.	No; Nominations	Nominated	Ludovik, Hygerta	Ardit, Labinot H.	Labinot H., Kushtrim	Labinot R., Ludovik	Walked (Day 82)						
Kushtrim	Nominated	Klodian, Elijona	Labinot R., Alba	Alba, Labinot R.	Klodian, Londrim	Nominated	No; Nominations	Fjolla, Ludovik	No; Nominations	No; Nominations	Ardit, Ludovik	Ludovik, Lim	Hygerta, Ardit	Alba, Labinot R.	Evicted (Day 82)						
Lim	Not in House										Labinot H., Hygerta	Kushtrim, Hygerta	Klodian, Kushtrim	Walked (Day 76)							
Labinot H.	Not in House			Exempt	Benita, Alba	Nominated	No; Nominations	Ardit, Sasa	No; Nominations	Nominated	Ludovik, Ardit	Hygerta, Ardit	Hygerta, Aurora & Suanita	Evicted (Day 75)							
Bia	Nominated	Linda, Sasa	Ibro, Shkurta	Kushtrim, Ardit	Dolce, Alba	Nominated	No; Nominations	Klodian, Dolce	No; Nominations	Nominated	Hygerta, Ardit	Evicted (Day 61)									
Toney	Nominated	Getoar, Sasa	Ibro, Labinot R.	Labinot R., Kushtrim	Dolce, Alba	Nominated	No; Nominations	Sasa, Labinot H.	No; Nominations	Nominated	Evicted (Day 54)										
Fjolla	Not in House			Exempt	Labinot R., Alba	Nominated	No; Nominations	Labinot R., Alba	No; Nominations	Walked (Day 50)											
Eduard	Nominated	Ibro, Bia	Labinot R., Ibro	Labinot R., Alba	Fjolla, Labinot H.	Nominated	No; Nominations	Ardit, Bia	Nominated	Evicted (Day 50)											
Sasa	Nominated	Bia, Klodian	Labinot R., Alba	Alba, Labinot R.	Labinot R., Alba	Nominated	No; Nominations	Labinot R., Alba	Walked (Day 47)												
Shkurta	Nominated	Eduard, Elijona	Londrim, Klodian	Ardit, Kushtrim	Londrim, Klodian	Nominated	Nominated	Evicted (Day 40)													
Jasmin	Not in House				Exempt	Nominated	Evicted (Day 40)														
Ibro	Nominated	Toney, Bia	Labinot R., Nailir	Shkurta, Benita	Evicted (Day 26)																
Nailir	Nominated	Eduard, Dolce	Londrim, Alba	Evicted (Day 19)																	
Getoar	Nominated	Klodian, Bia	Evicted (Day 12)																		
Linda	Nominated	Refused	Walked (Day 8)																		
Mentor	Nominated	Walked (Day 2)																			
Notes	1	2	3, 4	5	6	7	8	7, 9	10	7, 9, 10	11, 12	13	none		14, 15	16	14	17	17	18	
Nominated	none										Alba, Ardit, Bia, Hygerta, Ludovik	none									
Saved by HoH	none										Hygerta	none									
Nominated by HoH	none										Kushtrim	none									
Against public vote	Alba, Ardit, Benita, Bia, Dolce, Eduard, Elijona, Getoar, Hygerta, Ibro, Klodian, Kushtrim, Linda, ~~Mentor,~~; Nailir, Sasa, Shkurta, Toney	Alba, Benita, Bia, Eduard, Getoar, Klodian, ~~Linda,~~; Londrim, Nailir, Sasa, Toney	Alba, Hygerta, Ibro, Labinot R., Nailir, Shkurta	Alba, Ibro, Labinot R., Sasa, Shkurta	Alba, Kushtrim, Labinot H., Labinot R., Toney	All; Housemates	Alba, Benita, Dolce, Labinot R., Shkurta	Alba, Ardit, Bia, Labinot H., Labinot R., ~~Sasa,~~; Toney	Eduard	Alba, Ardit, Bia, Labinot H., Labinot R., Toney	Alba, Ardit, Bia, Kushtrim, Ludovik	Alba, Ardit, Hygerta, Labinot H., Ludovik	Aurora & Suanita, Kushtrim, Labinot H.	Kushtrim, Labinot R., Ludovik	Benita, Dolce, Klodian, Labinot R., Ludovik	Labinot R.	Ardit, Aurora & Suanita, Elijona, Hygerta, Londrim	Ardit, Aurora & Suanita, Benita, Dolce, Hygerta, Klodian, Londrim	Aurora & Suanita, Benita, Dolce, Hygerta, Klodian, Londrim	Elijona, Hygerta, Klodian, Londrim, Ludovik	
Walked	Mentor	Linda	none					Sasa	Fjolla	none			Lim	Alba	none						
Evicted	Shkurta; Most votes to move	Getoar; Fewest votes to save	Nailir; Fewest votes to save	Ibro; Fewest votes to save	Toney; Fewest votes to save	Jasmin; Fewest votes to save	Shkurta; Fewest votes to save	Eviction postponed	Eduard; 65% to evict	Toney; Fewest votes to save	Bia; Most votes to evict	Ardit; Fewest votes to save	Labinot H. Fewest votes to save	Kushtrim; Fewest votes to save	Ludovik; Most votes to be finalist	Labinot R. Most votes to evict	Elijona; Most votes to be finalist	Ardit; Fewest votes to save	Aurora & Suanita; Fewest votes to be finalist	Hygerta; Fewest votes (out of 5)	Klodian; Fewest votes (out of 4)
Evicted	Shkurta; Most votes to move	Getoar; Fewest votes to save	Nailir; Fewest votes to save	Ibro; Fewest votes to save	Toney; Fewest votes to save	Jasmin; Fewest votes to save	Shkurta; Fewest votes to save	Eviction postponed	Eduard; 65% to evict	Toney; Fewest votes to save	Bia; Most votes to evict	Ardit; Fewest votes to save	Labinot H. Fewest votes to save	Kushtrim; Fewest votes to save	Eviction cancelled	Labinot R. Most votes to evict	Elijona; Most votes to be finalist	Ardit; Fewest votes to save	Dolce; Fewest votes to be finalist	Ludovik; Fewest votes (out of 3)	Elijona; Fewest votes (out of 2)
Evicted	Shkurta; Most votes to move	Getoar; Fewest votes to save	Nailir; Fewest votes to save	Ibro; Fewest votes to save	Toney; Fewest votes to save	Jasmin; Fewest votes to save	Shkurta; Fewest votes to save	Eviction postponed	Eduard; 65% to evict	Toney; Fewest votes to save	Bia; Most votes to evict	Ardit; Fewest votes to save	Labinot H. Fewest votes to save	Kushtrim; Fewest votes to save	Eviction cancelled	Labinot R. Most votes to evict	Elijona; Most votes to be finalist	Ardit; Fewest votes to save	Benita; Fewest votes to be finalist	Londrim; Most votes to win	

=== Notes ===
- ^Note 1: During the live launch of the show, Londrim had the power to place all housemates up for the public vote while receiving immunity himself. He decided to use this power. It was later announced that this week's eviction would be fake, and that the fake evicted housemate would enter a secret house next door. Shkurta was fake-evicted on Day 5 and remained in the secret room until Day 8.
- ^Note 2: Alba, Benita and Londrim were automatically nominated due to breaking the rules.
- ^Note 3: The viewers voted for their favorite housemate. The housemate with the fewest votes, was up for elimination and the housemate with the most votes was the Head of Household for the third week. Hygerta had the fewest votes and Londrim had the most votes.
- ^Note 4: On Day 15, Dolce had immunity because she was taking part in the Housemate exchange.
- ^Note 5: The viewers voted for their favorite housemate. The housemates with the fewest votes, were up for elimination. Ibro and Sasa had the fewest votes.
- ^Note 6: On Day 29, the viewers voted for their favorite housemate. The housemate with the fewest votes, was up for elimination. Toney and Kushtrim had the fewest votes and Elijona had the most votes.
- ^Note 7: On Day 36, Ardit, Benita and Labinot R. were given the option to bring Toney back in the competition, whilst sacrificing €20,000 from the prize fund, which they accepted. One condition of Toney’s return was that he must face every public vote for the rest of the season.
- ^Note 8: On Day 40, Alba, Benita, Dolce, Labinot R. and Shkurta were nominated due to breaking the rules.
- ^Note 9: On Day 47, Sasa walked from the competition due to medical reasons. The original eviction, which had featured Sasa, was postponed to the next live show on Day 50.
- ^Note 10: On Day 50, due to threatening behaviour towards other housemates, a public vote was held to decide whether Eduard should be allowed to stay in the house. The planned eviction from Day 47 was again postponed to the next live show on Day 54.
- ^Note 11: Alba and Bia were automatically nominated due to breaking the rules.
- ^Note 12: Elijona as the Head of Household, had the power to save and replace one of the current nominees. She chose to save Hygerta, and replace with Kushtrim.
- ^Note 13: Ardit was evicted by the public, but he was revealed to have picked the Return Ticket, therefore he went back into the house.
- ^Note 14: The housemates were divided into two teams, and Benita and Londrim, as Heads of Household, were the captains.

Team Benita: Dolce, Klodian, Labinot R., Ludovik and Benita; Team Londrim: Ardit, Aurora & Suanita, Elijona, Hygerta and Londrim. This week Team Benita was nominated to determine the first finalist and the evicted housemate. Next week Team Londrim will be nominated to determine the second finalist.

- ^Note 15: The eviction was cancelled due to Labinot R.’s ejection.
- ^Note 16: On Day 89, due to aggressive behaviour towards other housemates, a public vote was held to decide whether Labinot R. should be allowed to stay in the house.
- ^Note 17: Except for Elijona and Ludovik, who were already finalist, the remaining housemates were nominated to determine the finalists.
- ^Note 18: At the final round, the public voted for the winner.
