= Big Brother VIP Kosova season 3 =

Big Brother VIP Kosova
- Season 3
- Hosted by: Alaudin Hamiti; Jonida Vokshi
- No. of days: 99
- No. of housemates: 27
- Winner: Drilon Rama
- Runner-up: Xheneta Fetahu
- Companion show: Big Talk Kosova
- No. of episodes: 27 (live shows)

Release
- Original network: Klan Kosova
- Original release: 18 October 2024 – 24 January 2025

Season chronology
- ← Previous; Season 2 Next → Season 4

Big Brother VIP Kosova 3, was the third season of Big Brother VIP Kosova, once again hosted by Alaudin Hamiti and Jonida Vokshi. The season began airing on 18 October 2024 on Klan Kosova, and ended after 99 days on 24 January 2025.

The viewers were able to watch the whole season live from the house in two live pay-per-view channels, Big Brother VIP Kosova 1 and Big Brother VIP Kosova 2, available on the Kosovan TV platform Artmotion, as well as on NimiTV and TVALB for the Kosovo-Albanian diaspora in Europe, the United States, and Canada. The show is also broadcast in Albania on the TV platform Tring and, for the first time, on DigitAlb, which also broadcasts the Albanian version Big Brother VIP.

The two new opinionists for the prime shows were journalist Milaim Zeka and actress Olta Gixhari. In the sixteenth prime show, season 2 housemate Santiana Maloku replaced Olta Gixhari who was temporarily away. Diellza Daka was the new host for the third season of the spin-off show Big Talk Kosova, with season 2 housemates Edona James and Santiana Maloku, who were the two opinionists.

On 24 January 2025, Drilon Rama was announced as the winner of the season, with Xheneta Fetahu as the runner-up.

== Production ==
In June 2024, presenter Alaudin Hamiti announced that the third season would begin on Klan Kosova, with further details to be revealed in September 2024.

There were rumors that Jonida Vokshi might not return as the presenter for the third season, and that Alaudin Hamiti might co-host the show with Arbana Osmani, who has hosted the Albanian versions of Big Brother and Big Brother VIP. Additionally, there was speculation that Arbana Osmani and singer Luiz Ejlli, the winner of Big Brother VIP Albania 2, would co-host the third season of Big Brother VIP Kosova.

Rumors also circulated about potential new opinionists, with names like Luiz Ejlli, journalist Milaim Zeka, and TV presenter Einxhel Shkira being mentioned. There was further speculation that Olsa Muhameti, former director and executive producer of Për'puthen and Hell's Kitchen Albania on Top Channel, might no longer be with Top Channel and instead join Klan Kosova as the executive producer for the third season of Big Brother VIP Kosova.

On 5 September 2024, it was announced that Olsa Muhameti would be the new executive producer of the third season, replacing Yllka Sedllari Hamiti. On 29 September 2024, in an interview for the show SOL on Klan Kosova, Muhameti revealed that the series would begin airing in early October 2024. She also confirmed that Alaudin Hamiti would return as the presenter for the third season, a role he held the previous year. On 7 October 2024, it was announced that Milaim Zeka would be one of the new opinionists. On 13 October 2024, Alaudin Hamiti, in an interview for the show SOL on Klan Kosova, announced that Jonida Vokshi would continue to co-host the show with him. On 14 October 2024, Klan Kosova confirmed Olta Gixhari as the second opinionist.

The spin-off show Big Talk Kosova returned for its third season. On 13 October 2024, it was announced that Diellza Daka would be the new host of the show.

== Housemates ==
On Day 1, twenty housemates entered the house during the launch. On Day 71, following the eviction of Laurent Krasniqi & Fitim Sylejmani, the duo was split up and Big Brother gave the opportunity to enter the house as a single housemate. Laurent did not want to return, but Fitim wanted to return on the house. Then a televoting opened and the viewers decided if Fitim would return or would not return. The public decided to return Fitim on the house and play as an individual housemate. Besart "Gjesti" Kelmendi, one day after his eviction, went on to become a housemate on the fourth season of Big Brother VIP in Albania.

Celebrity	Age on entry	Notability	Day entered	Day exited	Status
Drilon Rama	24	Boxer	1	99	Winner
Xheneta Fetahu	28	Model	1	32	Runner-up
Xheneta Fetahu	28	Model	32	99	Runner-up
Vullnet Krasniqi	36	Journalist	1	99	3rd place
Naim "Xuxi" Bunjaku	56	Musician	8	99	4th place
Sara Kolami	30	Actress	1	99	5th place
Drenusha Latifi	39	Musician and former pageant model	1	92	Evicted
Gresë Gashi	30	Actress	1	92	Evicted
Leonardo Gashi	26	Musician and social media influencer	1	92	Evicted
Rovena Stefa	45	Musician	1	85	Evicted
Besart "Gjesti" Kelmendi	24	Musician	1	81	Evicted
Fitim Sylejmani	25	Social media influencer	53	71	Evicted
Fitim Sylejmani	25	Social media influencer	71	78	Evicted
Laurent Krasniqi	27	Social media influencer	53	71	Evicted
Florjeta "Lela" Seferi	24	Make-up artist and social media influencer	1	64	Evicted
Anisa Veseli	22	Musician	29	57	Evicted
Kevin Edmond	29	Musician	1	57	Evicted
Pajtim "Paul" Morina	34	Actor and businessman	29	53	Walked
Arion Rexha	26	Rapper	1	50	Evicted
Burim Vatovci	21	Social media influencer	1	43	Evicted
Eduard Kuçi	24	Reality television star	29	39	Walked
Ana Ejupi	19	Social media influencer	1	36	Evicted
Diana Tahiri	31	Model	1	33	Walked
Mevlan Shaba	39	Reality television star	1	29	Evicted
Besfort Daka	38	Actor	1	22	Ejected
Rezart Veleshnja	38	Actor	1	22	Ejected
Atilla Kardesh	44	Restaurateur	18	20	Walked
Burbuqe "Bay T" Tahiri	24	Rapper	1	15	Evicted
Arjeta "Aria" Palushaj	36	Singer and fashion designer	1	8	Evicted

== Nominations table ==
2-in-1 housemate called 'Laurent & Fitim', their nominations counted as one. (Week 8 - 10)

	Week 1	Week 2		Week 3	Week 4	Week 5		Week 6	Week 7	Week 8		Week 9	Week 10		Week 11	Week 12			Week 13	Week 14 Final	
	Week 1	Day 11	Day 15	Week 3	Week 4	Day 32		Week 6	Week 7	Day 53	Day 57	Week 9	Day 67	Day 71	Week 11	Day 81		Day 85	Week 13	Week 14 Final	
Head(s) of Household	Sara	Drilon		Gresë, Vullnet	Arion	Gresë		Lela	Drilon, Sara	Kevin, Xuxi		Laurent & Fitim, Sara	Laurent & Fitim		none	Leonardo			none		
Viewers’ Favorite	none	Drilon	none	Gresë	none			Gresë	Drilon	Vullnet	none		Gjesti	none							
Viewers’ least Favorite	none	Bay T Drenusha	none	Ana; Gjesti	Ana; Lela	none		Burim; Paul	none	Kevin	none		Laurent & Fitim, Xheneta	none							
Drilon	Aria, Leonardo	No; Nominations	No; Nominations	Xheneta, Lela	Mevlan, Leonardo	No; Nominations	Gjesti, Drenusha	Gresë, Lela	Kevin	Xuxi, Lela	No; Nominations	Lela, Leonardo	Drenusha, Vullnet	Not eligible	Drenusha, Gresë	Nominated	Leonardo, Drenusha	Nominated	Exempt	Winner (Day 99)	
Xheneta	Gresë, Lela	No; Nominations	No; Nominations	Xuxi, Sara	Xuxi, Gresë	Nominated	Sara, Arion	Arion, Xuxi	Arion	Anisa, Drenusha	No; Nominations	Rovena, Gjesti	Xuxi, Leonardo	Not eligible	Gresë, Fitim	No; Nominations	Sara, Rovena	Nominated	Nominated	Runner-up (Day 99)	
Vullnet	Xheneta, Rezart	No; Nominations	No; Nominations	Mevlan, Rezart	Gjesti, Leonardo	No; Nominations	Xuxi, Gjesti	Xuxi, Eduard	Anisa	Leonardo, Lela	No; Nominations	Gresë, Gjesti	Xuxi, Leonardo	Not eligible	Fitim, Rovena	No; Nominations	Xuxi, Gresë	Nominated	Nominated	Third place (Day 99)	
Xuxi	Not in House	Nominated	Nominated	Mevlan, Drenusha	Mevlan, Gjesti	No; Nominations	Vullnet, Gjesti	Drenusha, Drilon	Arion	Vullnet, Gresë	No; Nominations	Gjesti, Vullnet	Drenusha, Vullnet	Not eligible	Drenusha, Vullnet	No; Nominations	Rovena, Vullnet	Nominated	Nominated	Fourth place (Day 99)	
Sara	Gresë, Vullnet	No; Nominations	No; Nominations	Rezart, Xheneta	Xheneta, Gjesti	No; Nominations	Rovena, Drenusha	Eduard, Drilon	Gresë	Anisa, Leonardo	No; Nominations	Drenusha, Lela, Leonardo	Rovena, Leonardo	Not eligible	Drenusha, Fitim	No; Nominations	Xuxi, Leonardo	Nominated	Nominated	Fifth place (Day 99)	
Drenusha	Drilon, Leonardo	Nominated	No; Nominations	Xuxi, Besfort	Xuxi, Gresë	Nominated	Sara, Rovena	Gresë, Xuxi	Arion	Leonardo, Rovena	No; Nominations	Gjesti, Rovena	Vullnet, Leonardo	Not eligible	Fitim, Vullnet	No; Nominations	Sara, Rovena	Nominated	Nominated	Evicted (Day 92)	
Gresë	Rezart, Arion	No; Nominations	No; Nominations	Rezart, Xheneta	Drenusha, Xheneta	Drenusha, Xheneta	Gjesti, Rovena	Eduard, Drilon	Paul	Rovena, Leonardo	No; Nominations	Lela, Leonardo	Leonardo, Xuxi	Not eligible	Drenusha, Leonardo	No; Nominations	Rovena, Leonardo	Nominated	Nominated	Evicted (Day 92)	
Leonardo	Rezart, Drilon	No; Nominations	No; Nominations	Xheneta, Rezart	Xheneta, Arion	No; Nominations	Arion, Ana	Drilon, Eduard	Rovena	Sara, Anisa	No; Nominations	Gjesti, Rovena	Drenusha, Gresë	Not eligible	Vullnet, Drenusha	Drilon, Gjesti	Sara, Drilon	Nominated	Nominated	Evicted (Day 92)	
Rovena	Mevlan, Besfort	No; Nominations	No; Nominations	Xheneta, Gresë	Vullnet, Gresë	No; Nominations	Kevin, Sara	Eduard, Drilon	Saved	Vullnet, Gresë	No; Nominations	Vullnet, Lela	Gjesti, Xuxi	Not eligible	Vullnet, Drenusha	No; Nominations	Xuxi, Drenusha	Evicted (Day 85)			
Gjesti	Gresë, Bay T	No; Nominations	No; Nominations	Gresë, Vullnet	Xuxi, Gresë	No; Nominations	Rovena, Ana	Xuxi, Arion	Arion	Anisa, Gresë	Nominated	Lela, Leonardo	Leonardo, Drenusha	Not eligible	Leonardo, Xuxi	Nominated	Evicted (Day 81)				
Fitim	Not in House									Exempt	No; Nominations	Lela, Rovena	Sara, Xuxi, Rovena	Nominated	Drenusha, Leonardo	Evicted (Day 78)					
Laurent	Not in House									Exempt	No; Nominations	Lela, Rovena	Sara, Xuxi, Rovena	Evicted (Day 71)							
Lela	Xheneta, Mevlan	No; Nominations	No; Nominations	Rovena, Mevlan	Rovena, Gjesti	No; Nominations	Rovena, Paul	Drilon, Eduard	Leonardo	Xuxi, Rovena	No; Nominations	Gjesti, Rovena	Evicted (Day 64)								
Anisa	Not in House					No; Nominations	Rovena, Gjesti	Arion, Rovena	Lela	Gresë, Rovena	Nominated	Evicted (Day 57)									
Kevin	Besfort, Gresë	No; Nominations	No; Nominations	Rovena, Burim	Diana, Burim	No; Nominations	Rovena, Burim	Gresë, Rovena	Arion	Anisa, Drenusha	Evicted (Day 57)										
Paul	Not in House					No; Nominations	Gjesti, Rovena	Xheneta, Lela	Vullnet	Walked (Day 53)											
Arion	Rezart, Mevlan	No; Nominations	No; Nominations	Mevlan, Gjesti	Mevlan, Leonardo	No; Nominations	Leonardo, Gjesti	Drenusha, Xheneta	Sara	Evicted (Day 50)											
Burim	Drilon, Gresë	No; Nominations	No; Nominations	Arion, Rezart	Gjesti, Xheneta	No; Nominations	Kevin, Ana	Arion, Drilon	Evicted (Day 43)												
Eduard	Not in House					No; Nominations	Gjesti, Ana	Gresë, Rovena	Walked (Day 39)												
Ana	Xheneta, Gresë	No; Nominations	No; Nominations	Rovena, Vullnet	Gjesti, Leonardo	No; Nominations	Rovena, Gjesti	Evicted (Day 36)													
Diana	Aria, Gresë	No; Nominations	No; Nominations	Rezart, Besfort	Gjesti, Mevlan	No; Nominations	Gjesti, Leonardo	Walked (Day 33)													
Mevlan	Besfort, Aria	Nominated	No; Nominations	Rovena, Lela	Sara, Vullnet	Evicted (Day 29)															
Besfort	Rezart, Mevlan	Nominated	No; Nominations	Rezart, Drenusha	Ejected (Day 22)																
Rezart	Vullnet, Gresë	Nominated	No; Nominations	Xuxi, Besfort	Ejected (Day 22)																
Atilla	Not in House			Exempt	Walked (Day 20)																
Bay T	Gresë, Rezart	Nominated	Evicted (Day 15)																		
Aria	Gresë, Drilon	Evicted (Day 8)																			
Notes	1	2, 3	4	5, 6	7	8, 9, 10	8, 11	12, 13	14	15, 16	17	15, 18	15, 19, 20	21	15	22	15	23	24	25	
Nominated	Aria, Besfort, Drilon, Gresë, Mevlan, Rezart, Xheneta	none																			
Saved by HoH	Drilon	none																			
Nominated by HoH	Vullnet	none				Drenusha, Xheneta	none					Drenusha	Sara	none		Drilon, Gjesti	none				
Against public vote	Aria, Besfort, Gresë, Mevlan, Rezart, Vullnet, Xheneta	Bay T, Besfort, Drenusha, Mevlan, Rezart, Xuxi	Xuxi	Ana, Gjesti, Mevlan, Rezart, Rovena, Xheneta	Ana, Gjesti, Gresë, Lela, Leonardo, Mevlan, Xheneta	Drenusha, Xheneta	Ana, Arion, Drenusha, Eduard, Gjesti, Kevin, Leonardo, Rovena, Sara, Xheneta	Arion, Burim, Drilon, ~~Eduard~~, Gresë, Paul, Xuxi	Arion, Drenusha, Gjesti, Xheneta, Xuxi	Anisa, Gresë, Kevin, Leonardo, Rovena, Xheneta	Anisa, Gjesti	Drenusha, Gjesti, Lela, Rovena, Xheneta	Laurent & Fitim, Leonardo, Sara, Xheneta, Xuxi	Fitim	Drenusha, Fitim, Vullnet, Xheneta	Drilon, Gjesti	Leonardo, Rovena, Sara, Xheneta, Xuxi	All housemates	Drenusha, Gresë, Leonardo, Sara, Vullnet, Xheneta, Xuxi	Drilon, Sara, Vullnet, Xuxi, Xheneta	
Ejected	none			Besfort, Rezart	none																
Walked	none			Atilla	none		Diana	Eduard	none	Paul	none										
Evicted	Aria; Fewest votes to save	Bay T Fewest votes to save	Xuxi; 66.1% to stay	Eviction cancelled	Mevlan; Fewest votes to save	Xheneta; Most votes to evict	Ana; Fewest votes to save	Burim; Fewest votes to save	Arion; Fewest votes to save	Kevin; Fewest votes to save	Anisa; Most votes to evict	Lela; Fewest votes to save	Laurent & Fitim; Fewest votes to save	Fitim; 68% to return	Fitim; Fewest votes to save	Gjesti; Most votes to evict	Rovena; Fewest votes to save	Drilon; Most votes to be finalist	Leonardo; Fewest votes to be finalist	Sara; Fewest votes (out of 5)	Xuxi; Fewest votes (out of 4)
Evicted	Aria; Fewest votes to save	Bay T Fewest votes to save	Xuxi; 66.1% to stay	Eviction cancelled	Mevlan; Fewest votes to save	Xheneta; Most votes to evict	Ana; Fewest votes to save	Burim; Fewest votes to save	Arion; Fewest votes to save	Kevin; Fewest votes to save	Anisa; Most votes to evict	Lela; Fewest votes to save	Laurent & Fitim; Fewest votes to save	Fitim; 68% to return	Fitim; Fewest votes to save	Gjesti; Most votes to evict	Rovena; Fewest votes to save	Drilon; Most votes to be finalist	Gresë; Fewest votes to be finalist	Vullnet; Fewest votes (out of 3)	Xheneta; Fewest votes (out of 2)
Evicted	Aria; Fewest votes to save	Bay T Fewest votes to save	Xuxi; 66.1% to stay	Eviction cancelled	Mevlan; Fewest votes to save	Xheneta; Most votes to evict	Ana; Fewest votes to save	Burim; Fewest votes to save	Arion; Fewest votes to save	Kevin; Fewest votes to save	Anisa; Most votes to evict	Lela; Fewest votes to save	Laurent & Fitim; Fewest votes to save	Fitim; 68% to return	Fitim; Fewest votes to save	Gjesti; Most votes to evict	Rovena; Fewest votes to save	Drilon; Most votes to be finalist	Drenusha; Fewest votes to be finalist	Drilon; Most votes to win	

=== Notes ===
- ^Note 1: Sara as the Head of Household, had the power to save and replace one of the current nominees. She chose to save Drilon, and replace with Vullnet.
- ^Note 2: Besfort, Mevlan, Rezart and Xuxi were automatically nominated due to breaking the rules.
- ^Note 3: On Day 11, the viewers voted for their favorite housemate. The two housemates with the fewest votes, were up for elimination and the housemate with the most votes was the Head of Household for the second week. Bay T and Drenusha had the fewest votes and Drilon had the most votes.
- ^Note 4: Xuxi was automatically nominated due to breaking the rules. On Day 15, the viewers voted for Xuxi to stay in the house or to be evicted.
- ^Note 5: On Day 18, the viewers voted for their favorite housemate. The two housemates with the fewest votes, were up for elimination and the housemate with the most votes had a surprise. Ana and Gjesti had the fewest votes and Gresë had the most votes.
- ^Note 6: Due to Atilla's walking from the House on Day 20 and because Besfort and Rezart were ejected on Day 22, the eviction was cancelled.
- ^Note 7: On Day 25, the viewers voted for their favorite housemate. The two housemates with the fewest votes, were up for elimination. Ana and Lela had the fewest votes.
- ^Note 8: This housemate was Head of Household and received immunity from eviction for the week.
- ^Note 9: Gresë as the Head of Household, had the power to nominate two housemates and automatically face the public vote. She chose to nominate Drenusha and Xheneta.
- ^Note 10: Xheneta was evicted by the public, but she was revealed to have picked the Return Ticket, therefore she went back into the House.
- ^Note 11: Eduard and Xheneta were automatically nominated due to breaking the rules.
- ^Note 12: On Day 39, the viewers voted for their favorite housemate. The two housemates with the fewest votes, were up for elimination. Burim and Paul had the fewest votes. Gresë was voted as the favorite housemate.
- ^Note 13: The two Opinionists were given the opportunity to give immunity to one housemate of their choosing. They choose Sara.
- ^Note 14: On Day 46, each housemate had to save another contestant through a saving chain. Drilon began to choose as he was the favorite housemate by the viewers. Drenusha, Gjesti, Xheneta and Xuxi were the last housemates standing as they were not saved, and thus became the nominees. Then the four nominees had the power to nominate one from the saved housemates. They choose Arion.
- ^Note 15: Xheneta due breaking the rules, Big Brother announced that she would automatically face every eviction of the season until she was evicted, meaning she also could not be nominated by her fellow housemates in following weeks.
- ^Note 16: On Day 53, the viewers voted for their favorite housemate. The housemate with the fewest votes, was up for elimination. Kevin had the fewest votes and Vullnet had the most votes.
- ^Note 17: Anisa and Gjesti were automatically nominated due to breaking the rules.
- ^Note 18: On Day 60, Sara as the Head of Household, had the power to nominate one housemate and automatically face the public vote. She chose to nominate Drenusha.
- ^Note 19: On Day 67, Laurent & Fitim as the Head of Household, had the power to nominate one housemate and automatically face the public vote. They chose to nominate Sara.
- ^Note 20: On Day 67, the viewers voted for their favorite housemate. The housemate with the fewest votes, was up for elimination. Laurent & Fitim and Xheneta had the fewest votes and Gjesti had the most votes.
- ^Note 21: On Day 71, after the eviction of Laurent & Fitim, the viewers voted for Fitim to return or not return on the house as an individual player. He received the most votes and returned to the house.
- ^Note 22: Leonardo as the Head of Household, had the power to nominate two housemates and automatically face the public vote. He chose to nominate Drilon and Gjesti.
- ^Note 23: On Day 85, all housemates were nominated and the viewers voted for the first finalist.
- ^Note 24: Except Drilon, who was finalist, all other housemates were nominated and the viewers voted for the last four finalists.
- ^Note 25: At the final round, the public voted for the winner.
