= Dušan Zinaja =

Yugoslav footballer

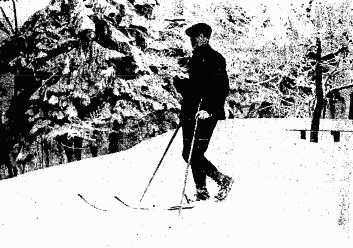
- Zinaja during skiing competition (1922) in Zakopane, Poland

Personal information
- Date of birth: 23 October 1893
- Place of birth: Budapest, Austria-Hungary
- Date of death: 26 September 1948 (aged 54)
- Place of death: Poklek, Yugoslavia
- Position: Striker

Senior career*
Years	Team	Apps	(Gls)
1923	HAŠK		

International career
1923	Kingdom of Yugoslavia	1	(0)

Managerial career
- 1924–1925: Kingdom of Yugoslavia
- * Club domestic league appearances and goals

Dušan Zinaja (23 October 1893 – 26 September 1948) was a Croatian and Yugoslav cross-country skier and football player and coach.

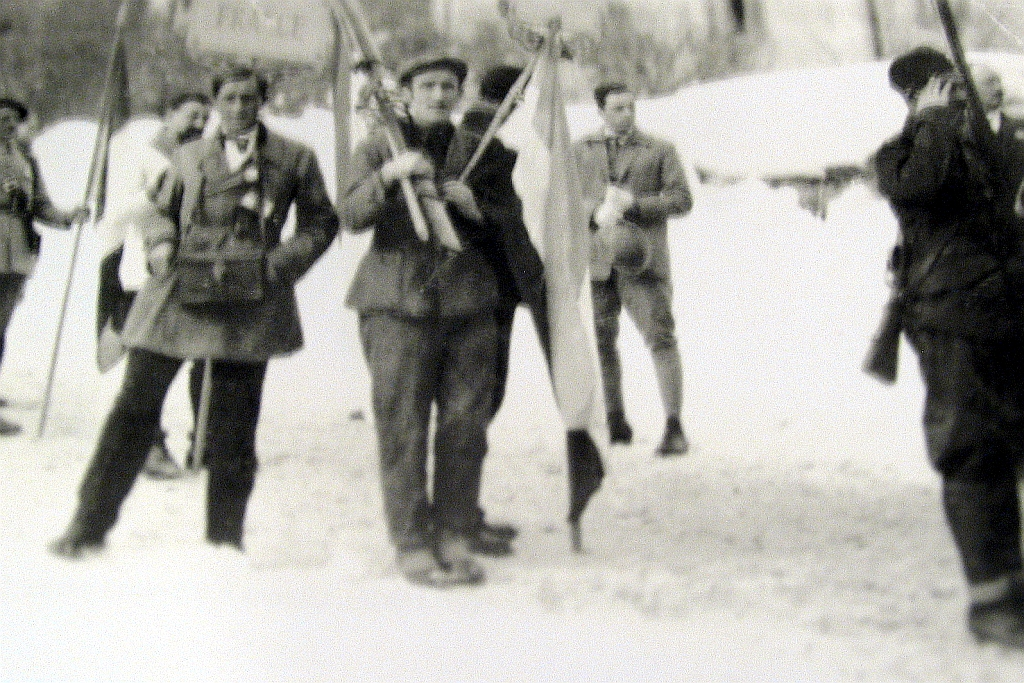
Zinaja at the opening ceremony of the 1924 Winter Olympics

Zinaja was born in Budapest (at the time Austria-Hungary). He was member of the Kingdom of Serbs, Croats and Slovenes team at the inaugural 1924 Winter Olympics in Chamonix where he took part in both cross-country skiing events.

== Football career ==
Zinaja spent his entire career with HAŠK (Croatian Academic & Sports Club). As member of the Kingdom of Serbs, Croats and Slovenes national football team, he has played only once, on 10 June 1923 in Bucharest against Romania.

Zinaja became first player in Yugoslav football history to be appointed a national team coach.

He led national team as coach from 28 September 1924 to 4 November 1925, during which time team of the Kingdom of Serbs, Croats and Slovenes played three matches.

== Death ==
Zinaja died on 26 September 1948 in a traffic accident near the village of Poklek on Mt. Žumberak.
