= Top Talent (Albanian TV series) =

Albanian reality competition show and TV series

- Genre: Reality competition
- Created by: Ledja Liku
- Directed by: Kliton Rama (season 1); Redi Treni (seasons 2–3)
- Creative director: Redi Neziri
- Presented by: Kelvi Kadilli (season 1); Eneda Tarifa (season 2); Oriela Nebijaj (season 3)
- Judges: Season 1: Marin Mema; Edi Manushi; Beti Njuma; Bieta Sulo; Kelvi Kadilli; Season 2: Muhamed Veliu; Elona Duro; Eno Popi; Salsano Rrapi; Season 3: Olti Curri; Jonida Vokshi; Anita Haradinaj; Hervin Çuli
- Country of origin: Albania
- Original language: Albanian
- No. of seasons: 3
- No. of episodes: 27 + 1 special

Production
- Executive producer: Ledja Liku
- Production company: Top Channel

Original release
- Network: Top Channel
- Release: 18 July 2018 – 27 March 2020

Top Talent, also known as Top Talent Albania, is an Albanian reality talent show competition produced by Top Channel. The show aired from 18 July 2018 to 27 March 2020 and featured contestants competing across three categories: journalism, television presenting, and performance. They were evaluated by a panel of rotating judges and advanced through successive elimination stages until a winner emerged.

== Format ==
Each season began with contestants from the three categories—journalist, presenter, and performer—presenting themselves before the judges during early weeks. The format progressed through quarter-finals spread over three shows, followed by two semi-final episodes, and concluded with a live final. Winners received a monetary prize and exposure on Top Channel.

== Production ==
The series was created and executive-produced by Ledja Liku. The first season was directed by Kliton Rama, with Redi Treni taking over direction for seasons two and three. The creative director throughout was Redi Neziri. The show was filmed and broadcast in Tirana, Albania.

== Judges and Presenters ==
Season	Host	Judges
1 (2018)	Kelvi Kadilli	Marin Mema, Edi Manushi, Beti Njuma, Bieta Sulo, Kelvi Kadilli
2 (2019)	Eneda Tarifa	Muhamed Veliu, Elona Duro, Eno Popi, Salsano Rrapi
3 (2020)	Oriela Nebijaj	Olti Curri, Jonida Vokshi, Anita Haradinaj, Hervin Çuli

== Seasons and Winners ==
Season	Episodes	First aired	Last aired	Winner
1	7	18 July 2018	29 August 2018	Xhesika Muça
2	10	3 May 2019	12 July 2019	Korado Aliaj
3	10	24 January 2020	27 March 2020	Quest Style Crew
