= CoolnFresh Magazine =

Online satirical magazine, based in Kosovo

- Categories: Satire
- Format: Online
- Founder: Fisnik Çerkini
- Founded: 2020
- Country: Kosovo
- Language: Albanian
- Website: coolnfreshmagazine.com

CoolnFresh Magazine is an Instagram-based satirical magazine founded by Fisnik Çerkini in 2020. It publishes content on taboo topics, social norms and political developments in Kosovo, the country where it originates from. As of January 2023, it has more than 130,000 followers on Instagram.

== History ==
CoolnFresh Magazine was founded in 2020 by Fisnik Çerkini, a marketing executive based in Kosovo. The magazine began to receive national coverage in Kosovo when it parodied Baton Haxhiu's statement on how the former Chairman of the Assembly of Kosovo Kadri Veseli supposedly jumped from a military aircraft - which was unable to land in Tiranë International Airport due to weather conditions - in order to join the Kosovo War. CoolnFresh Magazine began publishing scenes from Commando and Mission: Impossible films with the tagline, "Baton Haxhiu with exclusive footage from the Kadri Veseli jump". Previously, the magazine had received media coverage when it parodied the Prime Minister of Kosovo Albin Kurti's social media post on how "Kosovar people don't read enough" with a video where a Kosovar, who is reading a book during his holidays, tries to refute the Prime Minister's claim, only to be shown that the book was actually being used by him to hold his beach bed more tightly.
