= Big Brother VIP Kosova =

Kosovar reality television show

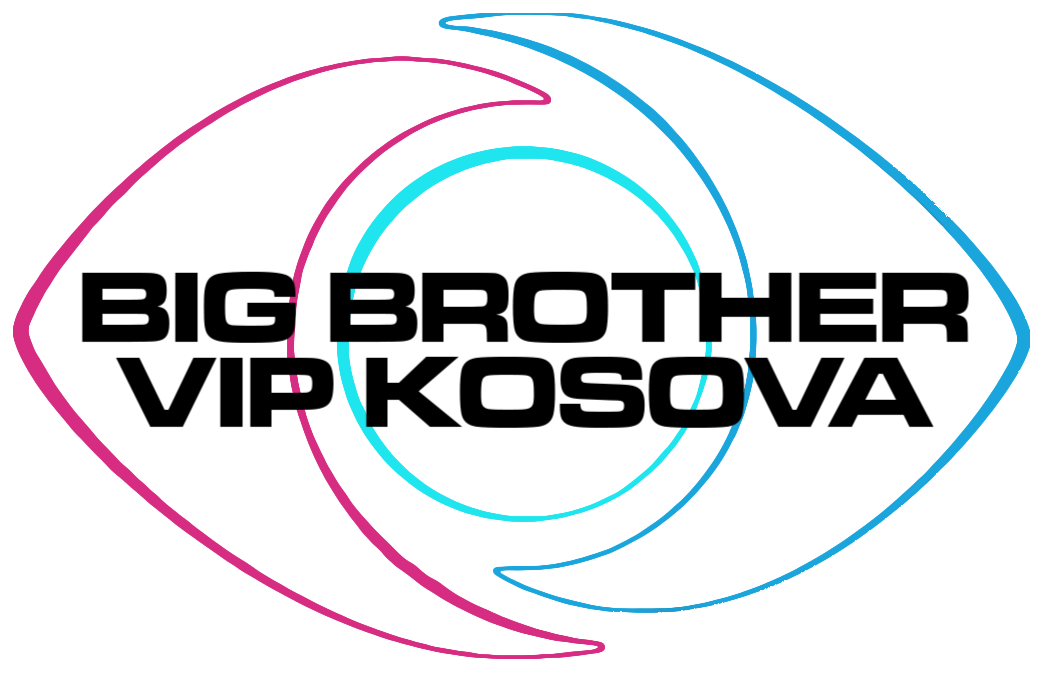
- Genre: Reality competition
- Created by: John de Mol Jr.
- Based on: Big Brother by John de Mol Jr.
- Directed by: Valon Morina (1–); Florent Dushi (1); Ervin Kotori (1)
- Presented by: Alaudin Hamiti; Jonida Vokshi
- Country of origin: Kosovo
- Original language: Albanian
- No. of seasons: 5
- No. of episodes: 87 (live shows)

Production
- Executive producers: Yllka Sedllari Hamiti (1–2); Olsa Muhameti (3–)
- Camera setup: Multi-camera
- Production company: Banijay

Original release
- Network: Klan Kosova
- Release: 5 December 2022 – present

Related
- Big Talk Kosova

Big Brother VIP Kosova is a Kosovar reality game show based on the Dutch reality competition franchise Big Brother. The show follows a number of celebrity contestants, known as housemates, who are isolated from the outside world for an extended period of time in a custom built house. Each week, one of the housemates is evicted by a public vote, with the last housemate named the winner.

Big Brother VIP Kosova started airing on Klan Kosova on 5 December 2022. The show is hosted by Alaudin Hamiti, who has presented the show since its first season. Jonida Vokshi served as co-host for the first four seasons, before departing ahead of the fifth season.

The viewers are able to watch the whole season live from the house in two live pay-per-view channels, Big Brother VIP Kosova 1 and Big Brother VIP Kosova 2, available on the Kosovan TV platform Artmotion, as well as on NimiTV and TVALB for the Kosovo-Albanian diaspora in Europe, the United States, and Canada. Since the second season, the show is also broadcast in Albania on the TV platform Tring and, since the third season, on DigitAlb, which also broadcasts the Albanian version Big Brother VIP.

Due to satisfactory ratings of the first season, Klan Kosova announced a second season of Big Brother VIP Kosova, which began airing on 20 October 2023. The show was renewed for a third season and began airing on 18 October 2024 on Klan Kosova. In June 2025, Klan Kosova renewed the show for a fourth season and began airing on 17 November 2025.

On 17 March 2023, renowned Albanian rapper Arkimed Lushaj, known as Stresi, was announced as the winner of the first season. On 3 February 2024, former professional football player and model Lumbardh Salihu was announced as the winner of the second season. On 24 January 2025, boxer Drilon Rama was announced as the winner of the third season. On 27 February 2026, singer Londrim Mekaj was announced as the winner of the fourth season.

== Format ==
Big Brother VIP Kosova is a reality game show where a group of celebrity contestants, known as housemates, live in isolation inside a specially designed "house," cut off from the outside world. The housemates are under constant video surveillance, and they are prohibited from accessing television, the internet, print media, or any other form of external communication.

Throughout the competition, the housemates are confined within the house with no contact with the outside world. Viewers often play a role in the game by voting for their favorite housemates, with the most popular contestants earning immunity from eviction. Additionally, housemates themselves vote for a fellow contestant they consider deserving of immunity.

At least once a week, housemates secretly nominate two of their peers to face a public vote for eviction. The two or more housemates with the most nominations are put up for elimination, and the public decides who stays and who goes through text message or phone vote. The housemate with the most votes for eviction is eliminated from the house.

Housemates can also choose to voluntarily leave the game at any time if they find the experience too difficult to endure. When a housemate withdraws, a replacement is typically introduced to take their place.

In the final week of the season (the final for short), the remaining housemates face one last challenge: the viewers vote for the winner, who receives a grand prize of €200,000 and is crowned the ultimate victor of Big Brother VIP Kosova. In other cases, like the fourth season, the grand prize money can be reduced when Big Brother punishes the housemates. The winner of that season got €124,000 instead of €200,000.

== History ==
In June 2022, it was announced that Big Brother will come for the first time in Kosovo on Klan Kosova and Artmotion, with a celebrity version under the name Big Brother VIP Kosova. The show is broadcast live 24/7 on two pay-per-view channels, Big Brother VIP Kosova 1 and Big Brother VIP Kosova 2, which are available on the Kosovan TV platform Artmotion, as well as on NimiTV and TVALB for the Albanian diaspora in other countries of Europe, United States and Canada.

== Hosts and Opinionists ==
On 27 June 2022, it was announced that Alaudin Hamiti will be the presenter of the live shows. On 14 September 2022, it was announced that Jonida Vokshi will be the second presenter of the live shows, alongside Hamiti. Hamiti and Vokshi, also returned for the second season, as the presenters of the live shows. On 29 September 2024, it was announced that Alaudin Hamiti would return as the host for the third season. On 13 October 2024, Hamiti announced that Jonida Vokshi would also return as host for the third season.

On 18 September 2022, it was announced that Olti Curri will be the opinionist in the live shows, for the first season. On 21 November 2022, it was announced that Afërdita Paqarada will be the second opinionist in the live shows, with Curri. Paqarada was replaced by Anita Haradinaj on 23 January 2023. Anita Haradinaj returned as opinionist in the prime shows, for the second season, and was joined by Bledi Mane, replacing Curri. On 7 October 2024, was posted on the official account of Big Brother VIP Kosova on Facebook, that the new opinionist, for the third season, will be Milaim Zeka. On 14 October 2024, Klan Kosova announced Olta Gixhari, as the second opinionist.

=== Timeline of hosts and opinionists ===
Person	Series				
Person	1	2	3	4	5
Host
Alaudin Hamiti					
Jonida Vokshi					
Opinionist
Anita Haradinaj					
Olti Curri					
Afërdita Paqarada					
Bledi Mane					
Olta Gixhari					
Milaim Zeka					
Leonora Jakupi					
Rudina Dembacaj					
Resul Sinani					

== Series overview ==
Series	Days	Housemates	Winner	Runner-up	Episodes	Originally released		
Series	Days	Housemates	Winner	Runner-up	Episodes	First released	Last released	Network
1	102	26	Stresi	Vedat Bajrami	29 (live shows)	5 December 2022	17 March 2023	Klan Kosova
2	106	25	Lumbardh Salihu	Blerando	30 (live shows)	20 October 2023	3 February 2024	Klan Kosova
3	99	27	Drilon Rama	Xheneta Fetahu	27 (live shows)	18 October 2024	24 January 2025	Klan Kosova
4	103	27	Londrim Mekaj	Elijona Binakaj	29 (live shows)	17 November 2025	27 February 2026	Klan Kosova
5	TBA	TBA	TBA	TBA	TBA	30 October 2026	2027	Klan Kosova

== Companion show ==
=== Big Talk Kosova ===
Big Talk Kosova is a spin-off show of Big Brother VIP Kosova. The show premiered on 11 December 2022 on Klan Kosova. The show was announced in November 2022 and has received its own title card and promotional videos. In the first season, the show was broadcast every Sunday at 03:30 pm and since the second season, is broadcasting every Sunday at 06:00 pm. The series features debates and conversations about the latest goings inside and outside the house with a studio audience and celebrity panel, and with the first eliminated housemate who are usually invited to the studio after leaving.

On 18 November 2022, it was announced that Elita Rudi will present the first season. Mbresa Hajrullahu was the new host for the second season, replacing Rudi. On 13 October 2024, it was announced that Diellza Daka would be the host for the third season, replacing Hajrullahu. Lela Seferi, who was a housemate in the third season of Big Brother VIP Kosova, announced on her Instagram account that she will be the host of the fourth season of Big Talk Kosova. Later, it was announced that Diellza Daka would remain as the host of Big Talk Kosova, through a video announcement made on Big Brother VIP Kosova's official Facebook page and on Klan Kosova's website.
