= Jo-Ann Strauss =

South African entrepreneur and former Miss South Africa contest winner

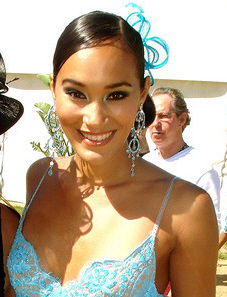
- Born: Jo-Ann Cindy Strauss; 3 February 1981 (age 45); Cape Town, South Africa
- Occupations: Media personality, model
- Beauty pageant titleholder
- Title: Miss South Africa 2000
- Years active: 2000–present
- Major competitions: Miss Universe 2001 (Unplaced); Miss World 2001 (Top 10)
- Website: www.joannstrauss.com

Jo-Ann Cindy Strauss (born 3 February 1981 in Cape Town) is a South African model, public speaker, businesswoman and beauty pageant titleholder. In 2001 she represented her country as Miss South Africa at the Miss Universe pageant in Puerto Rico as well as at the Miss World pageant hosted at Sun City in her home country in 2001. She was featured in the 2001 music video of the Irish pop group Westlife's single "When You're Looking Like That".

== Career ==
Strauss obtained her bachelor's degree at the Stellenbosch University. During her reigning year as Miss South Africa, she started her media career with the Afrikaans TV magazine programme Pasella before anchoring the English lifestyle magazine show Top Billing (TV show), for which she has interviewed the likes of Charlize Theron, Antonio Banderas and George Clooney. She featured as cover girl for many South African magazines.

A year after Strauss was crowned Miss South Africa, she took part in the first and only celebrity version of Celebrity Big Brother (South African TV series), where she finished runner-up.

In 2010, Jo-Ann presented the opening ceremony for the 2010 FIFA World Cup in South Africa for the German television network ZDF along with Thomas Gottschalk in a live broadcast from Johannesburg on 10 June.

== Social Projects ==
In 2008, Strauss spearheaded the Princess Project to give deserving young ladies the chance to go to their "Matric Balls" or "Proms" in designer dresses previously owned by South Africa's top celebrities. The idea behind her initiative was born of the fact that she herself went to her Matric Dance in a "previously-loved" designer dress which she bought with her mother at a second-hand store.

Strauss is one of South Africa's most respected media personalities and uses her profile and influence to help various initiatives. Her Princess Project has been supported by many South African and international stars and has donated over 80 dresses the help of the SA's magazines YOU, Huisgenoot and Drum, as well as Top Billing.

She partnered with the International Fashion Sale in 2010 and reached even more deserving young ladies in SA. Similar initiatives exist around the world, enabling young girls to feel like modern princesses.

In 2014, Strauss was appointed a Celebrity Advocate for international child rights organization, the United Nations Children's Fund (UNICEF) in South Africa.

== Awards and achievements ==
- Top Achiever in Class of "1995"
- Awarded the Duku Duku-Award for style
- Crowned Miss South Africa 2000.
