= Baton Haxhiu =

Kosovar journalist (born 1968)

- Born: February 24, 1965 (age 61); Poklek, SFR Yugoslavia
- Occupations: Columnist and journalist
- Years active: 1991–present
- Television: Klan Kosova (2009–2020); ABC News Albania (2020–2021); Euronews Albania (2021–)
- Awards: CPJ International Press Freedom Awards (1999)

Baton Haxhiu (born February 24, 1965 in Poklek, Kosovo) is a Kosovar columnist and journalist who has worked for media such as Koha Ditore, Gazeta Express, Klan Kosova and ABC News Albania. He now works for Euronews Albania and is the general director of Albanian Post.

== Background ==
He majored in sociology at University of Pristina, but his studies were interrupted when the government closed the university in 1991; he then continued studying with the city's underground academic movement. He worked as a section editor for Koha, a weekly Albanian-language magazine. He later became editor-in-chief of Koha Ditore, a Prishtina daily newspaper. According to the UK newspaper The Independent, under Haxhiu's management, Koha Ditore became "the leading Albanian-language source of information and of critical comment in Kosovo".

== 1999 threats ==
In March 1999, shortly before the NATO bombing of Serbia began, Haxhiu and Koha Ditore were fined under Yugoslav Information Law for their reporting. On March 23, the front page of Koha Ditore carried the headline "Nato, Just Do It", quoting the slogan of Nike shoes along with the Nike Swoosh.

In retaliation, government forces burnt down the paper's office that night, killing a guard. The paper's lawyer was murdered, and NATO incorrectly reported that Haxhiu had also been killed. Haxhiu escaped attack by hiding in a basement, where he spent more than a week with only apples and water. At one point, he heard reports of his own death on CNN, and he later described the experience as being "as close to death as skin to the bone."

On 2 April, soldiers ordered the entire neighborhood from their homes, and Haxhiu joined the line of refugees. He approached a woman with a child and persuaded her to pretend he was her husband and the child's father. Four days later, while Haxhiu was still trying to reach the Republic of Macedonia, word spread of his escape, and Albanian politician Arben Xhaferi dispatched a team to retrieve Haxhiu and bring him to safety. When Haxhiu reached the country, he resumed publishing Koha Ditore.

By October 1999, Haxhiu returned to Kosovo. In that month, the government of Kosovo Liberation Army leader Hashim Thaçi accused Haxhiu and publisher Veton Surroi were accused of being "pro-Serb vampires" coordinating with Yugoslav president Slobodan Milošević, stating: "people like them . . . should themselves realize that, one day, they too may be the targets of some personal vendetta, which is quite understandable. Therefore, both Veton Surroi and Baton Haxhiu, these ordinary Mafiosi, should not be left unpunished for their criminal acts." Despite the threat, the paper continued to publish.

That year, Haxhiu won the CPJ International Press Freedom Awards, which recognises journalists who show courage in defending press freedom despite facing attacks, threats, or imprisonment.

== Later journalism ==
Haxhiu later became the editor of the Gazeta Express. In July 2008, during the war crimes trial of Ramush Haradinaj, the International Criminal Tribunal for the former Yugoslavia found Haxhiu guilty of contempt of court for revealing the name of a protected witness in a newspaper article, and fined him US$10,000. Haxhiu appealed the verdict in September, but judges ruled that he had appealed outside the permitted window.

Upon the founding of Klan Kosova, he was appointed as General Director and hosted the debate programs Zona B and Zona e Debatit. He left the network in 2020. He is currently the head of Albanian Post, and makes appearances on Albanian-speaking television as a columnist.

== Personal life ==
Haxhiu has a wife and two sons.
