= Artmotion =

Data housing provider

- Company type: Privately held
- Industry: Data center
- Founded: 2000
- Headquarters: Steinhausen, Switzerland
- Key people: Mateo Meier (Founder and CEO)
- Services: Data housing
- Website: www.artmotion.eu

Artmotion Ltd. is a Swiss-based data housing provider. It operates two data centers near the Swiss Alps that are designed for security-seeking businesses, motivated by the country's political neutrality and ironclad privacy laws.

== History ==
Artmotion was founded in 2000 by Mateo Meier, who is also the current CEO of the company. In 2003, Artmotion acquired Cyberhost, a Swiss Cloud hosting services provider. Since 2011, the Swiss data center provider Everyware Ltd. holds 25% of Artmotion's shares. Artmotion increased its capital in 2015.

Artmotion acquired 58% of shares in Citadelo and became a shareholder and board member in 2020. However Artmotion and Citadelo continued to operate as separate companies. Artmotion also owns a stake in Citadelo Switzerland.

== NSA PRISM scandal ==
After the 2013 PRISM leak, several cloud computing companies faced criticism for their lack of security, especially those based in US. Artmotion, among other Swiss-based cloud computing providers gained the most out of this scandal. Mostly due to the country's stringent data privacy laws, their customer base increased and the company had their revenue increased 45 percent in a month following the scandal. According to the CEO Mateo Meier, except in a few European countries like Luxembourg and Switzerland, personal privacy is difficult to service in this modern world. Switzerland is not a member of European Union, hence it is exempt from pan-European agreements to share data with member states, as well as the United States.
