= Stresi =

Albanian rapper (born 1986)

- Born: Arkimed Lushaj; 15 June 1986 (age 39); Tirana, PSR Albania
- Occupations: Rapper, singer, songwriter, producer
- Years active: 2007–present
- Musical career
- Genres: Hip hop Rap
- Instrument: Vocals
- Label: BadBoys4Life

Arkimed Lushaj (born 15 June 1986), known professionally as Stresi, is an Albanian singer, songwriter/lyricist, reality show TV star as the winner of the first edition of Big Brother VIP Kosova. He is also a rapper and politician, recently elected by the vote of the National Assembly of the Democratic Party of Albania as a member of its National Council. He is the founder and leader of the hip-hop music label BadBoys4Life. He is considered one of the most famous and prominent musical figures and celebrities in the Albanian trap, hip-hop, drill and gangsta rap industry. His public rivalry and reconciliation with prominent Albanian hip-hop artist Noizy were coined as an era-defining period in Albanian and Balkan hip-hop and rap scene.

== Early life ==
Stresi was born on 15 June 1986 in Tirana to a father from Tropojë and a mother from Kosovo. When he was a child, his family moved to Belgium. During his childhood years there, he sang and performed in shows that were organized for Albanians in the diaspora. He lived in Belgium for several years, until he returned to Albania in 2007. He also lived in Italy for several years. As a troubled child who tried to run away from home, he was given the name Stresi, which means "stress" in Albanian, by his mother. Stresi graduated in psychology, although he has never practiced the profession.

== Career ==
Stresi started his career as a rapper in 2007 when he was 20 years old. In 2012, Stresi became the musical ally of the Babastars label, but the alliance ended in 2020 when the rappers Ghetto Geasy and Majk of the label dissed him in the song "Hajde Te Baba". In response to the diss, Stresi released the song "Po Foli i Fundit". Stresi is the founder of the music label BadBoys4Life. This label includes singers and bands from Albania and Kosovo, such as One T, Anestezion, Pakufijt, Enes Qosa, and Flor Bana.

== Discography ==
=== Singles ===
- 2004 – Unë jam
- 2009 – Sonte Është Nata Ime
- 2009 – Hi...
- 2010 – My Love
- 2010 – Tik Tak
- 2011 – Bad Boys
- 2012 – Lamtumirë (feat. Xheraldina Berisha)
- 2012 – Now Am Ballin (feat. Emiliano Pakufijt & Kulayde)
- 2012 – Lambo
- 2013 – Love Story
- 2013 – Thirrni Eulexin (feat. Anestezion & One T)
- 2014 – Më Fal (feat. Albresha)
- 2014 – Ushtari Rrugës (feat. Loni)
- 2015 – Mos Ma Luni Gocën
- 2016 – E Boj Temen
- 2017 – Shokun S'e Lo (feat. One T)
- 2017 – Fake Love (feat. Flor Bana)
- 2017 – Më Fal 2 (feat. Anxhelo Koçi)
- 2017 – Sa Her E Don (feat. Anxhelo Koçi & Flor Bana)
- 2018 – GTA
- 2018 – Të Du Mom (feat. Fatima Ymeri)
- 2019 – Real Life
- 2019 – Big Booty (feat. Don Phenom, Anxhelo Koçi & Flor Bana)
- 2019 – Nuk O Veq Gang (feat. MRK)
- 2019 – Hey Mama (feat. MRK)
- 2019 – Two Shots (feat. MRK & Anxhelo Koci)
- 2020 – Zemrën Maje
- 2020 – Loco
- 2020 – Kush Rakin Je Ti?
- 2020 – Shokun S'e Lo 3 (feat. One T & Anestezion)
- 2020 – Për Veti (feat. Finem & Solo)
- 2020 – Archimed
- 2020 – Gang Shit (feat. One T & Anestezion)
- 2021 – S'jom Dorzu (feat. Getinjo)
- 2021 – Feel Good (feat. Cbiz)
- 2021 – Out Of My Mind (feat. ISH)
- 2021 – A T'ka Marr Malli
- 2021 – Jo Jo Jo (feat. Pakufijt)
- 2021 – Shoqnia (feat. Bala)
- 2022 – Mafioz (feat. GER)
- 2022 – Savage
- 2022 – Paranoia (feat. Niku Bossi)
- 2022 – Noise
- 2022 – Coco (feat. Flor Bana)
- 2022 – Win Win (feat. One T)
- 2022 – I Smoke Them
- 2023 – Nobody (feat. One T)
- 2023 – Medalioni (feat. Noizy)
- 2023 – Cocaina
- 2023 – Sja Keni Iden
- 2023 – Maybach (feat. Il Ghost, Malsho, Riflo & Daxter)
