= Marin Mema =

Albanian journalist and footballer (born 1981)

Personal details
- Born: Marin Mema; 22 March 1981 (age 45) Tirana,
- Occupation: Footballer; Journalist
Association football career
- Positions: Midfielder; winger
Youth career
- Years: Team
- 1997–2002: Dinamo Tirana

Marin Mema (born 22 March 1981) is an Albanian investigative journalist and former footballer. In addition to being a reporter of Top Channel, he writes for Gazeta Shqiptare. During his football career, he played as a midfielder and winger. He is cousin of journalist Dojna Mema.

== Biography ==
Prior to dealing with journalism, Mema at the age of 9 started playing football at Dinamo Tirana, he was also part of one of Albania national youth team's regional selections in 1997, but after 12 years was forced to leave football due to injuries.

In July 2003, Mema graduated in journalism at the journalism department of the University of Tirana, he is mostly involved in investigative journalism, his reports range from government corruption to human rights abuses. In 2011–12, Mema reported from Margariti and Filiates about the properties of the Chams that have been appropriated by the Greek state. For his reports in August 2012, he was banned from entering Greece and declared persona non grata. The Union of Journalists of Albania protested in front of the Greek Embassy in Tirana against the entry ban.
