= Blerando =

- Born: Blerin Lajçi; 24 January 1999 (age 27); Germany
- Origin: Kosovo
- Occupations: Singer, songwriter, rapper
- Years active: 2021–present
- Label: Folé Publishing

Blerin Lajçi (born 24 January 1999), professionally known as Blerando, is a German-born Kosovan singer, songwriter, and rapper. He rose to fame and prominence after competing in the second season of Big Brother VIP Kosova, where he finished as the runner-up.

He crowned his relationship with marriage to his partner, Albulena Krasniqi, a well-known Albanian entrepreneur in Turkey.

== Life and career ==
Blerando was born on 24 January 1999, in Germany. His family is from Rugova, Kosovo and is of Albanian descent. Despite being born and raised in Germany, Blerando maintains ties to his Albanian heritage and creates music in the Albanian language. Some of Blerando's most successful songs include "Xhensila", "Magjike", and "Shadi".

He gained widespread recognition following his participation in the second season of Big Brother VIP Kosova. Blerando secured the 2nd-place position.

== Discography ==
- 2021: Shadi (feat. Fleggo)
- 2021: Magjike (feat. Fleggo)
- 2022: Tempelena
- 2022: Melancholy
- 2022: Vetun
- 2022: Shoke-Benefite
- 2022: Mesazhin
- 2022: Xhensila
- 2022: Nuse
- 2022: Nafta
- 2022: Dominante
- 2023: Loola (feat. Arvena)
- 2023: Manaferra
- 2023: Patinazh
- 2023: Nuk pritoj
- 2023: Çka na bone
- 2023: Po ti dikun po don me dal
- 2024: Jom betu
- 2024: Rrakata
- 2024: Katile 5.0 (feat. Klement)
- 2024: Rio e Tokyo
