= Lumbardh Salihu =

Footballer (born 1992)

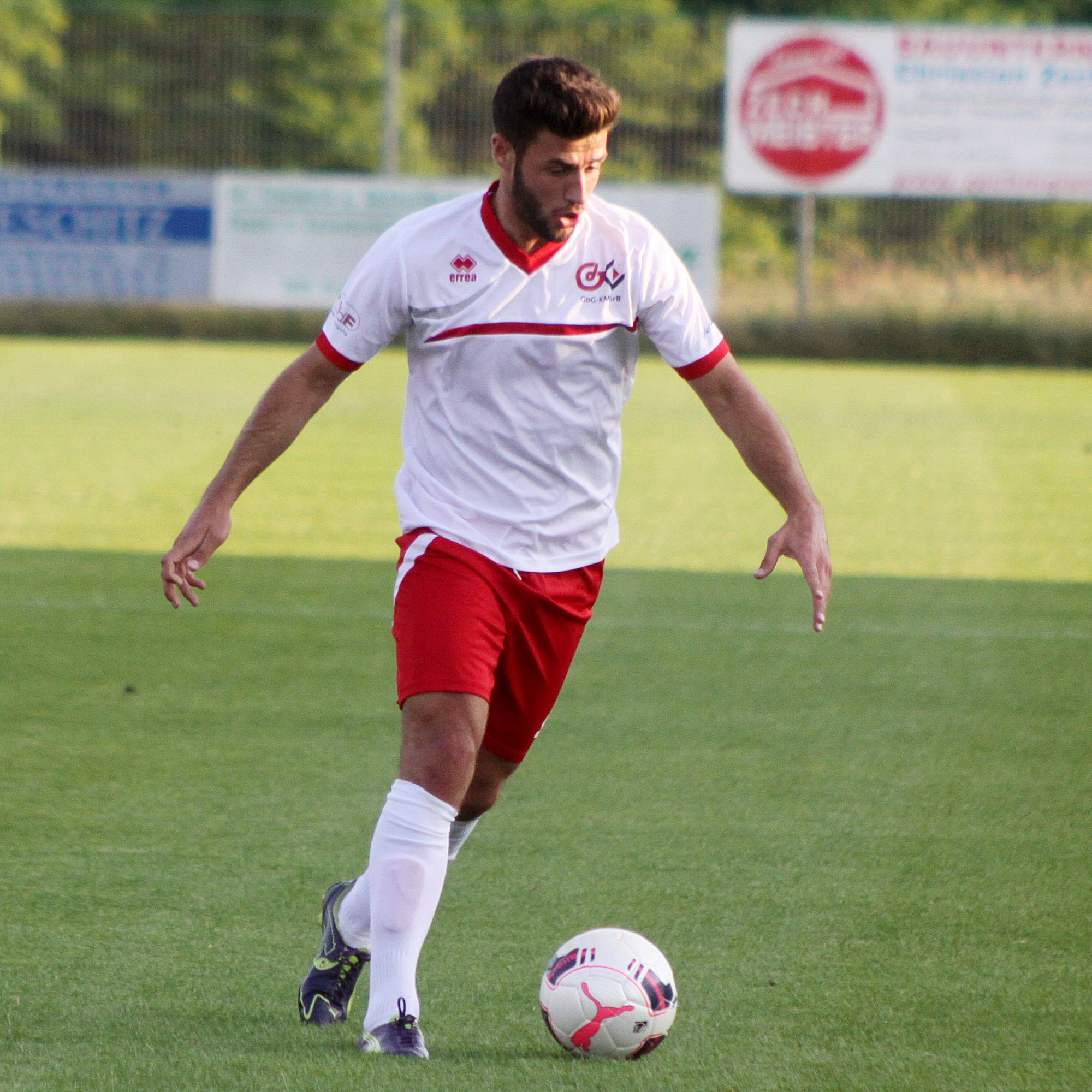
- Salihu with Austria at the 2015 FIFPro Tournament

Personal information
- Date of birth: 18 November 1992 (age 33)
- Place of birth: Gjilan, Kosovo
- Height: 1.80 m (5 ft 11 in)
- Position: Attacking midfielder

Youth career
- 2005–2010: Floridsdorfer AC
- 2008–2009: → Brigittenau (loan)

Senior career*
Years	Team	Apps	(Gls)
2009–2010	Wiener Linien	16	(11)
2010–2011	Liesing ASK	8	(4)
2011	SV Wienerberg	11	(4)
2011–2012	Northampton Town	2	(0)
2012–2014	Austria Klagenfurt	18	(0)
2013–2014	Annabichler SV	13	(2)
2015	Post SV Wien	13	(2)
2015–2016	SV Oberwart	16	(3)
2016	1. SC Sollenau	12	(1)
2016–2017	SV Schwechat	13	(2)
2017	Llapi	5	(0)
2017–2018	SV Haitzendorf	26	(2)
2018–2019	Obergänsernndorf	24	(0)
2019–2021	Oberp./Schwarz.	20	(2)
2022	Gerasdorf/Stammersdorf	7	(0)
2022–2023	FC Mistelbach	12	(2)
- * Club domestic league appearances and goals

Lumbardh Salihu (born 18 November 1992) is a former professional footballer who played as an attacking midfielder. Salihu lately competed on the celebrity version of Big Brother VIP Kosova and was crowned as the winner of the second season on 2 February 2024.

== Early life ==
His father, Salih Salihu, served as a deputy in the Assembly of the Republic of Kosovo for Vetëvendosje. His father left Kosovo for economic reasons. He and the family joined his father in Vienna in 2003.

== Football career ==
=== Early career ===
In 2005 Salihu started the career at Floridsdorfer AC. While, on 2008 was on loan for a year to Brigittenau.

On 1 January 2011. Salihu signed to Wiener Stadtliga side SV Wienerberg. On 13 March 2011, he made his debut in a 2–1 away win against Landstraßer after coming on as a substitute in the 61st minute in place of Denis Gavrilovic.

=== Northampton Town ===
On 29 July 2011. Salihu signed to League Two side Northampton Town. On 23 August 2011, he made his debut in a 4–0 defeat against Wolverhampton Wanderers in an EFL Cup match and after debut Gary Johnson, the Northampton Town manager said of his debut that "He's only just come back from an injury and he's only 18 so it was one of those where we just wanted to give him a little feel for it". He was released in January 2012.

=== Austria Klagenfurt and Annabichler SV ===
On 4 July 2012. Salihu signed to Regionalliga Mitte side Austria Klagenfurt and in 2013–14 season, he also came to Landesliga Kärnten side Annabichler SV (farm team).

=== Post SV Wien ===
On 1 January 2015. Salihu signed to Wiener Stadtliga side Post SV Wien. On 27 February 2015, he made his debut in a 0–0 away draw against Ostbahn XI after being named in the starting line-up.

=== Regionalliga Ost ===
He played for some the Regionalliga Ost teams as with Oberwart (2015–2016), 1. SC Sollenau (2016) and SV Schwechat (2016–2017).

=== Llapi ===
On 21 January 2017. Salihu signed to Football Superleague of Kosovo side Llapi.

=== Later career ===
On 1 July 2017. Salihu signed to 1. Niederösterreichische Landesliga side Haitzendorf. On 12 August 2017, he made his debut in a 1–1 home draw against Rohrbach/Gölsen after coming on as a substitute in the 46th minute in place of Benjamin Pasic.

== Media career ==
Salihu was crowned winner of the second season of Big Brother VIP Kosova in February 2024. He said he would invest the €144,000 prize money into property in Kosovo or Albania. On the show, he dated Kader Kicaj, though the pair split up after the series finished. He was later linked with singer Semi Japuaj. He gained Kosovar citizenship in September 2024.

== Political career ==
Salihu joined the Democratic League of Kosovo (LDK) in October 2024, being welcomed by party leader Lumir Abdixhiku, who said, "Welcome to the real biggest house in Kosovo, Lumbardh!" This was part of the LDK's strategy to recruit influential public figures with significant influence on social media. He met with the Kosovar diaspora in Switzerland in order to include expatriates in decision-making processes in Kosovo. However, he made a gaffe in a January 2025 interview by stating "I'm going to be a father soon" whilst talking about his sister's pregnancy.

He achieved 6,000 votes in his first bid for a seat in the Kosovo Assembly in February 2025. He was endorsed by the family of Ibrahim Rugova, former President of Kosovo. He ran for a seat for a second time in December 2025, but was again unsuccessful.
