= Milaim Zeka =

Kosovan journalist and former politician (born 1962)

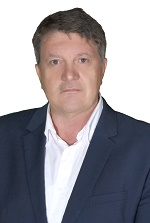
- Zeka in 2017

Member of the Assembly of Kosovo
- In office 3 August 2017 – 22 August 2019

Personal details
- Born: 25 October 1962 (age 63) Abria e Poshtme, Skenderaj, Kosovo
- Party: Social Democratic Initiative
- Children: 4
- Occupation: Journalist, television host, political adviser

Milaim Zeka (born 25 October 1962) is a Kosovan journalist, television host and former member of the Assembly of Kosovo.

== Journalism career ==
By profession, Zeka is a journalist. He has also worked as a film producer at RTK and as a political adviser. He was employed by Swedish television, Sveriges Television (SVT).

During the Kosovo War, although he was abroad for much of the conflict, he returned near its end and reported from the frontlines of the Battle of Košare, documenting events in the war.

== Political career ==
Zeka entered politics as a member of the Social Democratic Initiative (NISMA) party, serving as a deputy in the Assembly of Kosovo between 2017 and 2019.

== Television ==
Zeka is part of the panel on the television show Rrethi Katror on Top Channel, together with Alfred Cako and Bledi Mane, and appeared as a commentator in the third season of Big Brother Kosova. He also served as a judge on Dancing With the Stars Albania season 5. He is also the host of the program Zona 0 on Top News.

== Personal life ==
Zeka is married and has four daughters. He is a polyglot, fluent in Swedish, Norwegian, English and Croatian.

== See also ==
- Journalism in Kosovo
