= Celebrity Big Brother (South African TV series) =

- No. of days: 8
- No. of housemates: 10
- Winner: Bill Flynn
- Runner-up: Jo-Ann Strauss

Celebrity Big Brother is the celebrity season of the Big Brother. In it, the Housemates were only local celebrities. The show followed the main Big Brother rules, but with some changes. For example, the celebrity season's duration was much shorter, lasting only eight days.

The show started on 23 June 2002 and ended on 30 June 2002. The hosts were Mark Pilgrim and Gerry Rantseli. It was aired on M-Net. The winner was Bill Flynn. He won the chair from the diary room. All the money raised from voting was given for charity.

== Housemates ==
Housemates	Age	Famous for...	Residence
Thomas Msengana, "Bad Boy T"	27	DJ on YFM	
William Frederick Flynn, "Bill Flynn"	53	Actor and Singer	
Danny K	24	Singer	
Gloria Bosman		Singer	Pimvile, Soweto
Helen Desbois		Singer	Johannesburg
Jo-Ann Strauss	21	Miss South Africa 2000	Cape Town
Kabelo Ngakane	25	TV Presenter on Channel O	
Neil Stephen Andrews		M Net’s sports presenter	Farnham, England
Sam Cowan		DJ	
Tsakani Mhinga, "TK"		R&B singer	

== Nominations Table ==
	Day 2	Day 3	Day 4	Day 5	Day 6	Day 8 Final	
Bill	Gloria; Danny	Danny; Neil	? ?	? ?	? ?	Winner (Day 8)	
Jo-Ann	Gloria; TK	Bad Boy; Neil	? ?	? ?	? ?	Runner-Up (Day 8)	
Bad Boy	Gloria; Sam	TK; Bill	? ?	? ?	? ?	Third place (Day 8)	
Danny	Gloria; Sam	TK; Bad Boy	? ?	? ?	? ?	Fourth place (Day 8)	
Helen	Gloria; Sam	TK; Neil	? ?	? ?	? ?	Evicted (Day 7)	
Kabelo	Gloria; Bill	Jo-Ann; Neil	? ?	? ?	Evicted (Day 6)		
Neil	Gloria; Danny	Jo-Ann; TK	? ?	Evicted (Day 5)			
TK	Sam; Kabelo	Neil; Kabelo	Evicted (Day 4)				
Gloria	Neil; Helen	Evicted (Day 3)					
Sam	Gloria; Danny	Walked (Day 3)					
Up for eviction	Gloria; Sam; TK	Neil; TK	Bad Boy; Bill; Helen; Neil	Danny; Helen; Kabelo	Bad Boy; Bill; Helen; Jo-Ann	All; Housemates	
Walked	Sam	none					
Evicted	Gloria	TK	Neil	Kabelo	Helen	Danny	Bad Boy
Evicted	Gloria	TK	Neil	Kabelo	Helen	Jo-Ann	Bill
