= Celebrity Big Brother (Croatian TV series) =

- Presented by: Antonija Blaće; Marko Lušić
- No. of days: 15
- No. of housemates: 8
- Winner: Danijela Dvornik
- Runner-up: Marina Orsag

Release
- Original network: RTL
- Original release: 7 March 2008 – March 21, 2008

Celebrity Big Brother was a special celebrity edition of the Croatian version of the international reality television franchise Big Brother. It started on 7 March 2008 and was supposed to end on 28 March 2008. The show hosted by Antonija Blaća.

Unlike the regular version of Big Brother with civilian housemates who become famous after their stay in the house, eight housemates from Croatian public life entered this show.

The Big Brother house did not change significantly different from the fourth season, except that the entrance was not in the garden, but inside the house. The patterns on the walls of the living room and bedroom were also changed. The rules of this edition were no different from the regular seasons.

Because of lack of viewers, the season was cut short by one week and it was ended on 21 March 2008. The prize was 100,000 HRK, which the winner Danijela Dvornik donated for humanitarian purposes.

== Housemates ==
Celebrity	Age on entry	Notability	Residence	Day entered	Day exited	Status
Danijela Dvornik	41	Music Agent	Zagreb	1	14	Winner
Marina Orsag	29	Stand-up comedian	Zagreb	1	14	Runner-up
Iva Jerković	26	Model	Zagreb	1	14	3rd place
Ivica Kovačević	31	TV Director	Zagreb	1	14	4th place
Neven Ciganović	37	Fashion stylist	Zagreb	1	14	5th place
Marko Grubnić	26	Fashion stylist	Zagreb	1	14	Evicted
Salome Žentiily	39	Singer	Ljubljana, Slovenia	1	7	Evicted
Sandi Cenov	39	Singer	Zagreb	1	3	Evicted

== Nominations table ==
	Week 1	Week 2	Final		Nominations received
Danijela	Iva, Ivica	Marko, Marina	Winner (Day 14)		3
Marina	Neven, Marko	Marko, Iva	Runner-up (Day 14)		10
Iva	Marina, Salome	Marina, Danijela	Third place (Day 14)		2
Ivica	Salome, Marina	Marina, Marko	Fourth place (Day 14)		1
Neven	Marina, Salome	Marina, Danijela	Fifth place (Day 14)		1
Marko	Marina, Salome	Marina, Danijela	Evicted (Day 14)		5
Salome	Marko, Marina	Evicted (Day 7)			4
Sandi	Walked (Day 3)				N/A
Notes	1	2			
Nominated	Marina, Salome	Danijela, Marina, Marko	Danijela, Iva, Ivica, Marina, Neven		
Walked	Sandi	none			
Evicted	Salome; 61.09% to evict	Marko; 77.80% to evict	Neven; 4.27% (out of 5)	Ivica; 8.46% (out of 4)	
Evicted	Salome; 61.09% to evict	Marko; 77.80% to evict	Iva; 15.42% (out of 3)	Marina; 35.84% (out of 2)	
Saved	Marina; 38.91%	Marina; 15.47% Danijela; 6.73%	Danijela; 64.15% to win		

=== Notes ===
- ^Note 1: Sandi refused to nominate and chose to leave the house.
- ^Note 2: On the finale night, the eviction for the previous nomination took place first and then the public voted for the winner of the Celebrity Big Brother.
