= Leonora Jakupi =

Kosovar singer and songwriter

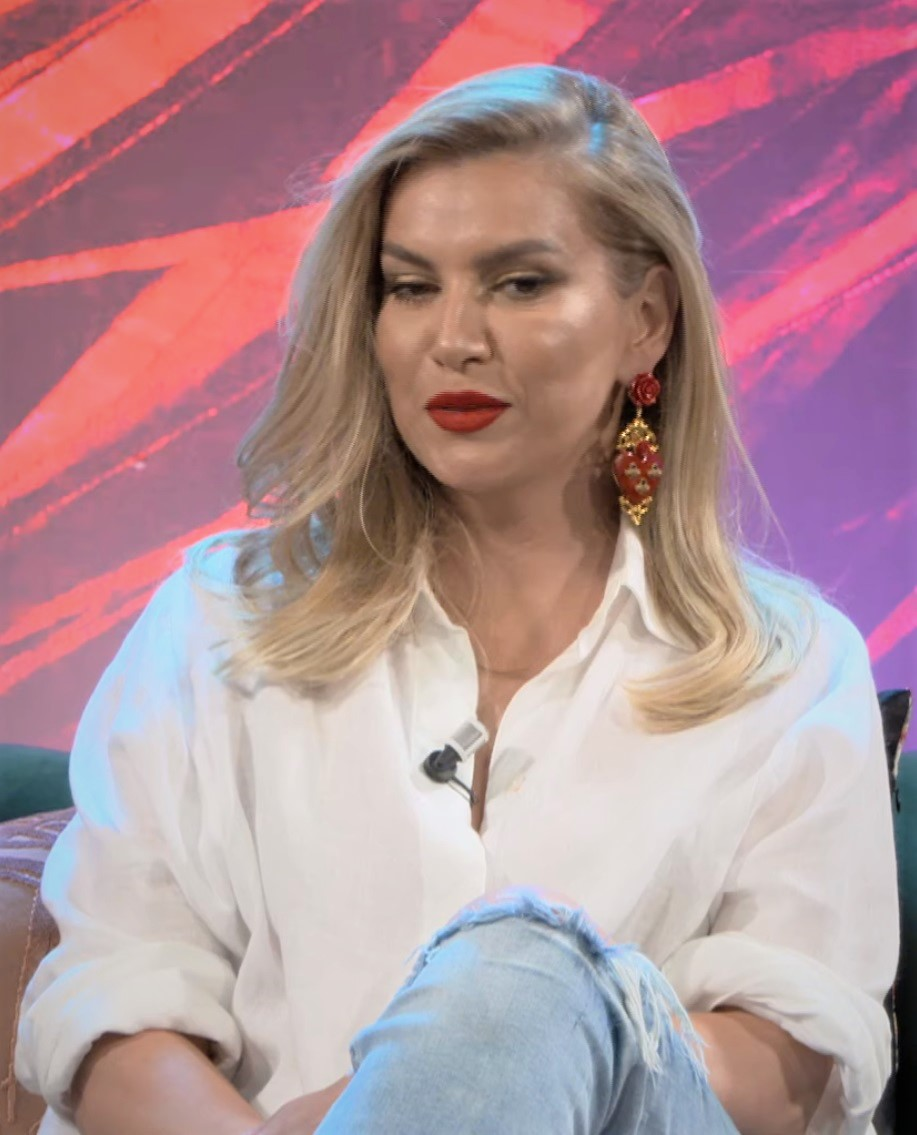
- Leonora Jakupi, 2019

Background information
- Born: Leonora Jakupi; 3 March 1979 (age 47); Skenderaj, (now Kosovo)
- Origin: Skenderaj, Kosovo
- Genres: Balkan pop
- Occupations: Singer, songwriter
- Years active: 1997–present

Leonora Jakupi (Albanian pronunciation: [lɛɔˈnɔɾa jaˈkupi]; born 3 March 1979) is a Kosovan singer and songwriter.

== Biography ==
=== Early career ===
Leonora Jakupi is an ethnic Albanian singer originally from Aqarevë, Skenderaj, Kosovo. She lost her father during the Kosovo War (1998–1999) – he was killed due to his involvement in the Kosovo Liberation Army. Her repertoire includes old-style Albanian folk and modern popular music.

The song that rose her to prominence was "A vritet pafajsia?" (Can innocence be killed?), released in 1998 while she was a war refugee in Albania. She dedicated the song to her father and other Albanians that were killed during the Kosovo War.

=== Present ===
Although Jakupi began her music career with ethno and folk-influenced songs, she has recently been working with modern pop. In 2009 she released "Ky është fundi" (This is the end), which became a hit on the radio and the Internet. She is popular in the Albanian-speaking territories of Albania, Kosovo, North Macedonia and Montenegro, and in countries such as Germany, Switzerland and, recently, Bulgaria.

Jakupi has been featured in gossip magazines and tabloids regarding her personal life. There have been rumors over whether or not she is single, but she has often declined to speak about this.

== Hits ==
'A vritet pafajsia' (1998)
Jakupi's most famous song released during Kosovo War

- 1997 – "O Bo Bo"
- 1997 – "Nuk Më Duhet Gjermania" (I Don't Need Germany)
- 1997 – "Buzekuqja" (Red-lipped Girl)
- 1998 – "A Vritet Pafajsia?" (Could innocence be killed?)
- 1999 – "Në Zemër Të Më Ndjesh" (Feel Me in Your Heart)
- 2001 – "Sahara"
- 2003 – "Ti Nuk Ekziston" (You Do Not Exist)
- 2005 – "Ende Të Dua" (I Still Love You)
- 2005 – "As Mos Provo" (Don't Even Try)
- 2006 – "Zemra Të Kërkon" (My Heart Asks for You)
- 2009 – "Ky Është Fundi" (This is the End)
- 2010 – "Puthja Jote" (Your Kiss)
- 2010 – "I Harruar" (Forgotten)
- 2011 – "Iluzion" (Illusion)
- 2011 – "Këngë E Pa Kënduar" (An Unsung Song)
- 2013 – "S'e Ndaloj" (I Don't Stop It)
- 2014 – "Vajza E Kojshisë" (The Daughter of a Neighbour)
- 2014 – "Ma Ngat" (Closer)
