= TVALB =

Albanian TV streaming platform

- Website type: OTT platform
- Founded: 2006; 20 years ago
- Headquarters: NY, U.S.
- Country of origin: United States
- Area served: United States; Canada
- Industry: Entertainment; Telecommunication
- Services: Pay television; Video on demand; Television distribution
- Website: tvalb.com
- Current status: Active

TVALB is an Albanian subscription video on-demand over-the-top streaming service, which caters to the Albanian diaspora in the US and Canada by offering them content in their native language. The service comes with live television, catch-up TV, and other features. It carries many mainstream Albanian channels from services like DigitAlb, Tring, Artmotion, TelKos and Kujtesa. As of 2021, TVALB is the only Albanian streaming service licensed to broadcast DigitAlb channels in the US and Canada.

The service offers popular reality game television shows such as Big Brother VIP Albania, Big Brother VIP Kosova, and Ferma VIP Albania catering to the Albanian diaspora in the United States and Canada.

== History ==
TVALB is the product of the Albanian-American television service company "FTAmarket". Since 2002, FTAmarket has been providing media services to the Albanian community in the USA and Canada. TVALB was founded in 2006 to show Albanian TV content to all Albanians living abroad with television services. This VOD platform streams hundreds of TV channels from Albania, Kosovo, Montenegro, Macedonia, and other countries.

In 2021, the Consulate General of the Republic of Kosovo in New York visited TVALB to express their support of Albanians and compatriots’ businesses.

Since 2021, TVALB is the only Albanian TV platform licensed to broadcast DigitAlb channels in North America.

== Services ==
TVALB is operated by a team of Albanians in New York City. The platform provides TV services, such as VOD, live TV, catch-up TV, and others, using the latest world technologies.

The company collaborates with DigitAlb, RTSH, Tring, Artmotion, and other Albanian media. TVALB offers 250 Albanian TV channels (more than 50 Digitalb channels, as well as Tring, and others), sports and film channels, and also international channels.

For delivering media, TVALB uses set-top boxes equipped with Wi-Fi.

== Supported devices ==
TVALB is also available on most popular devices with internet access, including:

- Smart TV (Samsung, LG)
- Amazon Fire TV
- Apple TV
- Roku TV
- Android TV
- Android devices (Android phones, Android tablets)
- Apple iOS devices (iPhone, iPad)
- PC, laptops (Windows, Linux, and MacOS)
