= Alaudin Hamiti =

Kosovan television presenter and media executive (born 1981)

- Born: 24 November 1981 (age 44); Pristina, SAP Kosovo, SFR Yugoslavia (now Kosovo)
- Occupations: Television presenter Media executive
- Years active: 2002–present
- Spouse: Yllka Sedllari Hamiti
- Children: 3

Alaudin Hamiti (born 24 November 1981) is a Kosovan television presenter and media executive. He is known for hosting Big Brother VIP Kosova and for his executive roles at Klan Kosova and Artmotion.

== Early life ==
Hamiti was born in Pristina, Kosovo, on 24 November 1981. He developed an interest in television as a child, following shows like Dynasty, Twin Peaks, as well as shows on MTV. In 1993, he moved with his family to Rovaniemi and then to Helsinki, Finland as refugees. He completed high school in Helsinki. In 2001, he returned to Kosovo following the Kosovo War.

== Career ==
After returning from Finland, Hamiti met Edona Kasapolli, then programming director at the public broadcaster RTK. In 2002, she inducted him into the RTK and he began his television career presenting Amazing Be Njeri until 2009.

In 2009, Klan Kosova was established, and Hamiti served as programming director and producer until 2018. He hosted the morning show Ora Shtatë for 14 years and created his talk show Nd'rrimi i Natës.

Since 2017, Hamiti has been serving as Content Director at Artmotion. Under his leadership, Artmotion became the main digital platform in Kosovo by 2022, offering local productions, reality shows, sports, and exclusive content.

He began hosting Big Brother VIP Kosova with Jonida Vokshi in December 2022 and continued for seasons two and three in 2023 and 2024.

== Personal life ==
In 2003, Hamiti met Yllka Sedllari during her visit from Switzerland to Kosovo; they later married. The couple has three children.

== Charity work ==
Following the 26 November 2019 earthquake in Albania, Hamiti announced on his show Nd'rrimi i Natës that he would collect funds to aid victims, in cooperation with the Fundjavë Ndryshe Foundation and other guest initiatives.
