= Jonida Vokshi =

Albanian television presenter and actress (born 1986)

- Born: 9 April 1986 (age 39); Tirana, Albania
- Occupations: Television presenter Actress
- Years active: 2007–present
- Spouse: Besnik Krapi (m. 2019)
- Children: 2

Jonida Vokshi (born 9 April 1986) is an Albanian television presenter and actress. She is best known for her role as Elizabeta in the comedy series O sa mirë, for co-hosting the 59th Festivali i Këngës, and as co-presenter of Big Brother VIP Kosova.

== Biography ==
Vokshi was born in Tirana, Albania. She studied acting and film directing at the Academy of Arts in Tirana, graduating in 2008, and later worked as a lecturer in drama.

== Career ==
Vokshi began acting in Albanian television and film productions in the late 2000s and was for around a decade one of the faces of the television platform DigitAlb.

In 2013, she was cast as Elizabeta in the sitcom O sa mirë, broadcast on Top Channel until 2017.

She later appeared as a jury member in the talent show Top Talent on Top Channel.

In December 2020, she co-hosted the 59th Festivali i Këngës alongside Blendi Salaj. Due to the COVID-19 pandemic, the event was held for the first time, outdoors at Sheshi Italia in Tirana.

Since 2022, Vokshi has co-presented Big Brother VIP Kosova with Alaudin Hamiti.

== Filmography ==
=== Films ===
- Shenjtoria (short film, 2008) – cast member
- 6 Idiotët (2014) – as Përbindëshi
- Shtatë Ditë (2016) – as Lana
- Derë e hapur (Open Door, 2019)
- The Albanian Virgin (2021) – as Lule

=== Television ===
- O sa mirë (2013–2017) – as Elizabeta
- Skanderbeg (2017) – as Lula
- HOT: Humans of Tirana (2021) – cast member
- Big Brother VIP Kosova (2022–present) – co-presenter

== Personal life ==
In September 2019, Vokshi married actor and director Besnik Krapi in Tirana. They have two children.
