= Klan Kosova =

Kosovo national television network

- The network's logo since 2015.
- Type: Private commercial
- Country: Kosovo
- Broadcast area: Kosovo; Albania; North Macedonia; Montenegro; Germany; Switzerland
- Affiliates: TV Klan (formerly)
- Headquarters: Lidhja e Pejës Street, Industrial Park, Pristina, Kosovo

Programming
- Language: Albanian
- Picture format: 1080i (HDTV 16:9)
- Timeshift service: Klan Kosova 2

Ownership
- Owner: Kushtrim Gojani (KGO Media Investments Holding)
- Key people: Barlet Imami (managing director); Fidan Syla (Technical director)
- Sister channels: Klan Kosova FM (radio)

History
- Founded: 8 December 2008 (17 years ago)
- Launched: 17 February 2009 (17 years ago)
- Founder: Aleksandër Frangaj; Baton Haxhiu

Links
- Website: klankosova.tv

Klan Kosova is a Kosovan private cable television channel based in Pristina, Kosovo. It was founded on 2 December 2008 and launched on 17 February 2009 as a Kosovan affiliate to TV Klan under the supervision of media mogul Aleksandër Frangaj. It is currently one of the most popular private broadcasters in the country.

The broadcaster was born out a need to answer to the latest developments in Kosovo and to get closer to Albania.

It is owned by KGO Media Investments Holding, a company based in Skopje.

== History ==
Klan Kosova was launched in 2009 on the first anniversary of Kosovo's independence, as a collaboration between the Albanian TV Klan and the Kosovan journalist Baton Haxhiu (who took on the role of General Director). The Albanian network would provide Klan Kosova its old equipment for use in its studios. Operating out of Hyzri Talla Street in the center of Pristina, the channel made the most of its limited conditions within a tight 11×6 square meter building.

It entered satellite frequencies in November 2009.

In 2015, Klan Kosova moved its offices to the former Shock Absorber Factory (Fabrika e Amortizatorëve) near Kosovo Polje, along the premises of several businesses owned by Devolli Corporation. This move came around the same time as its transition to high definition broadcasting.

In 2022, after the rights to broadcast the popular reality show Big Brother VIP for the Republic of Kosovo were secured with Banijay Rights, Klan Kosova announced that Big Brother VIP Kosova was going to debut on the channel starting 5 December 2022.

=== Temporary suspension of business license ===
Following an investigation by KosovaNews, Klan Kosova's business license was suspended on 14 June 2023 under the suspicion of misuse of official duties, as well as misuse of economic authorizations. The decision was controversial among the people of Kosovo and the international journalist community, grabbing the attention of the Quint countries which expressed "deep concern" over these events. Employees of Klan Kosova and members of the Association of Journalists of Kosovo (AJK) walked out in protest of the decision on 31 July 2023.

The decision to suspend Klan Kosova’s business license was overturned on July 24, 2023, by the Basic Court of Pristina. The court ruled that the suspension was not justified, allowing the television station to resume operations.

== Programmes ==
Klan Kosova's programmes include a broad range of mostly live and pre-recorded shows, news editions, socio-economic programs and entertainment (movies, sports, etc.).

=== News bulletins ===
Klan Kosova has four news editions - at 11am, 1pm, 3pm and the main news at 8pm. The news cycle also ends with Edicioni Special (Special Edition) at 11pm. These include mainly daily news about the political, economical, cultural, and social environment in Kosovo. The programs also provide information regarding the main events occurring in every part of the world.

=== Other programmes ===
- Çka ka Shpija (migrated from Radio Television of Kosovo)
- Big Brother VIP Kosova
- Ora 7
- Ora e Pasdites
- Info Magazine
- Minuta e Fundit
- Rubikon (moved from Kohavision)
- Privé
- Sports Show
- Kultora
- Familja Ime
- Kiks Kosova
- Pasion e Profesion
- Shija e Anës
- Sol me Adelina Hasanin
- Kosova Today
- DPT Te Fidani (moved from ATV)
- Fol Me Arin
- Hallakamë
- Weekend

== See also ==
- Television in Kosovo
- List of radio stations in Kosovo
- Artmotion
