= Newspapers in Kosovo =

Newspapers were one of the earliest methods of news dissemination in Kosovo. Rilindja was Kosovo's earliest Albanian-language newspaper, active from 1945 to 1990. After it was shut down by the occupying Serbian government, Rilindja rebranded in secret as Bujku until 1994. In the mid-to-late 1990s, the weekly Koha magazine, which later became the Koha Ditore, became the leading newspaper in Kosovo. Post-Kosovo War, print media in the country evolved into a competitive market. By 2010, there were eight active daily Albanian-language newspapers with anywhere between 25,000 and 35,000 copies in circulation. The most popular newspapers in Kosovo were Koha Ditore, Kosova Sot, Gazeta Express, Epoka e Re, Bota Sot, Infopress, Zëri, and Lajm.

Kosovo's press were subject to political pressure, as each major newspaper had a major party backing it, which may have led to its decline. With the world's evolution towards digital media like television and the internet, the decline of newspapers accelerated. As of January 2021, there are no newspapers in print in Kosovo, and each of the formerly popular newspapers have diverted to online-only editions, other media offerings like television, or shut down altogether.

== History ==
=== 1945–1990s: Rilindja, Bujku, and Koha Ditore ===
During the Serbian occupation of Kosovo in the 20th century, Rilindja (Albanian: "Rebirth"; formed in 1945 on the side of the National Liberation Movement alongside the Serbian-language publication Jedinstvo) was the first and only Albanian-language print publication in the country. The weekly publication was originally printed out of Prizren. The newspaper came out with strong stances in support of women's emancipation and the teaching of Albanian to children in homeschools. Rilindja became a daily newspaper by the mid-1960s and moved printing operations to its own building, the Rilindja Tower in Pristina, in the 1970s, also housing the weekly Turkish-language publication Tan.

Following attempts at an independent Republic of Kosovo in 1990, the publication of Rilindja was banned by the Serbian government. The following year, the Rilindja newsroom began publishing its news under the fake name Bujku (Albanian for "Farmer") in Kosovo, while publishing under Rilindja in Albania and Switzerland. This continued until 1998. At the same time as Bujku, journalist Veton Surroi founded the weekly magazine Koha in 1992 (modeled after Time Magazine), originally printed in Croatia, which became the leading magazine until its shutdown in 1997. Despite being inexperienced journalists, the weekly Koha planted the seeds of many of Kosovo's contemporary journalists such as Dukagjin Gorani, Baton Haxhiu, Shkëlzen Maliqi, and others. It also highlighted Albanian columnists like Mero Baze and Artur Zheji. In 1997, the Koha Ditore (Albanian: "Daily Time") was formed with Surroi as the editor-in-chief.

The late 1990s served a challenge for media in Kosovo at large. The Serbian government had been cracking down on Albanian-language media—shutting down the Radio Television of Prishtina and replacing it with the Radio Television of Serbia, and shuttering Rilindja. In the absence of Bujku, Koha Ditore filled the media blackout. During the NATO bombing of Yugoslavia, all written Albanian-language media was operating in exile, including Koha Ditore. At the same time as the first internet radio in Albanian—Radio 21—Koha Ditore began its short-lived written publication on the internet called ARTA (Albanian Radio and Television Agency), to inform the English-speaking public during the bombings.

=== 1999–2000s: Post-war plural press ===
Kosovo's post-war newspaper market blossomed, with Koha Ditore returning to Prishtina, and many other newspapers forming competition. According to a UBT University study, Koha Ditore's first issue back from exile in 1999 circulated up to 45,000 copies.

The plural newspaper market's growth coincided with the formation of a multi-party political system in the country, since each newspaper had a particular political party backing it. Koha Ditore was originally considered independent, but gained controversy when its founder Veton Surroi entered politics with the Reformist Party ORA.

Some of the largest newspapers in the country entered the Kosovo press: Gazeta Express, Epoka e Re, Bota Sot, Lajm, Kosova Sot, Infopress and Zëri.

By 2009, there were eight daily, Albanian-language newspapers in circulation in Kosovo. Each of them had around 25,000~35,000 copies per day, which translates to around three-in-five people reading a daily paper when taking Kosovo's population of 2.1 million people into account.

=== Late 2000s–present: Evolution into digital media and decline of print ===
In 2010, a report by the OSCE Mission in Kosovo asserted that the newsrooms in Kosovo were lacking funds and that media consumption trends were heavily skewed towards television as the emerging news source. Based on polls by Index Kosova that were cited in the report, 86% of respondents claimed that they got news from television, followed by 7% via print and 5% via radio. This charts relatively evenly with the rise of the three major television networks in Kosovo: the RTK, RTV21, and Kohavision, (Note: The RTK was formed by some of the former employees of the Radio Television of Prishtina after a decade-long exile. RTV21 is the evolution of Radio 21, and Kohavision is the television offering of the Koha Ditore.) which were covering the majority of current events in the region. Cable television was also on the rise at this time, with networks like Klan Kosova gaining popularity.

The same report judges that by the late 2000s, aside from a poor "elitist" approach to its audience and inability to adapt with the audiovisual medium, poor newspaper distribution and high political pressure were also deciding factors behind low newspaper circulation. The UBT University study specifies that newspaper circulation had dramatically fallen by 2019. In 2019, Koha Ditore had a circulation of 5,000 copies, Epoka e Re less than 2,500 copies, and Zëri less than 5,000 copies.

Global trends of newspaper decline caught up to Kosovo in the mid-2010s and early 2020s. Since Kosovo has a internet penetration rate (its penetration rate was 72.1% by 2012) its citizens rely more on internet media than on print media. More newspapers expanded their television and online offerings (for example: Gazeta Express began publishing exclusive video content, and became an online-only publication in 2013. It founded its own television station, T7, in 2017).

Their fate was sealed with the global COVID-19 pandemic, where newspapers could not be sold and online news thrived. By 2020, three of the major print publications shut down. In 2019, only four publications were in circulation: Koha Ditore, Zëri, Epoka e Re and Bota Sot. Koha Ditore ceased its print publication in March 2020 due to COVID-19 measures, and never returned. As of then, it offers the newspaper only as part of an online membership. As of January 2021, there are no newspapers in Kosovo. Most of Kosovo's media consumption is now through television, social media, and online websites.

== Major newspapers ==
- Kosova Press is the first news wire agency on Kosovo. The news agency Kosova Press was established on January 4, 1999. Since that time, it has published information in these languages: Albanian, English, German and French. It published in Albanian and English.
- Koha Ditore ("The Daily Time") claims it is independent, but the owner Veton Surroi was the leader of the Reformist Party ORA. It was the only newspaper published before 1999. Koha Ditore is considered the most serious newspaper in Kosovo.
- Gazeta Express ("Express Newspaper") is an independent online newsmedia with most visits in the country. The director of Gazeta Express Berat Buzhala is a former (PDK) MP . Owned by among others mobile operator IPKO. The paper has been accused by some people and organizations in Kosovo of Islamophobia.
- Bota Sot ('World Today') Pro-Democratic League of Kosovo (LDK). One of the few Kosovar newspapers distributed in many Western countries.
- Epoka e Re ("The New Era") pro-VETËVENDOSJE!
- Kosova Sot ("Kosovo Today") is Pro-Democratic Party of Kosovo (PDK). Claims to have the highest circulation.
- Lajm ("News", singular) pro-New Kosovo Alliance (AKR) owned by the Kosovo Albanian businessman and politician Behgjet Pacolli. Tabloid.

== Historical titles ==
- Tan, Turkish-language weekly newspaper published from 1969 to 1999
- Jedinstvo, Serbian-language weekly newspaper published from 1944, printed in Pristina alongside Rilindja during the Serbian occupation, now printed in South Mitrovica

== See also ==
- Media of Kosovo
