= Media in Pristina =

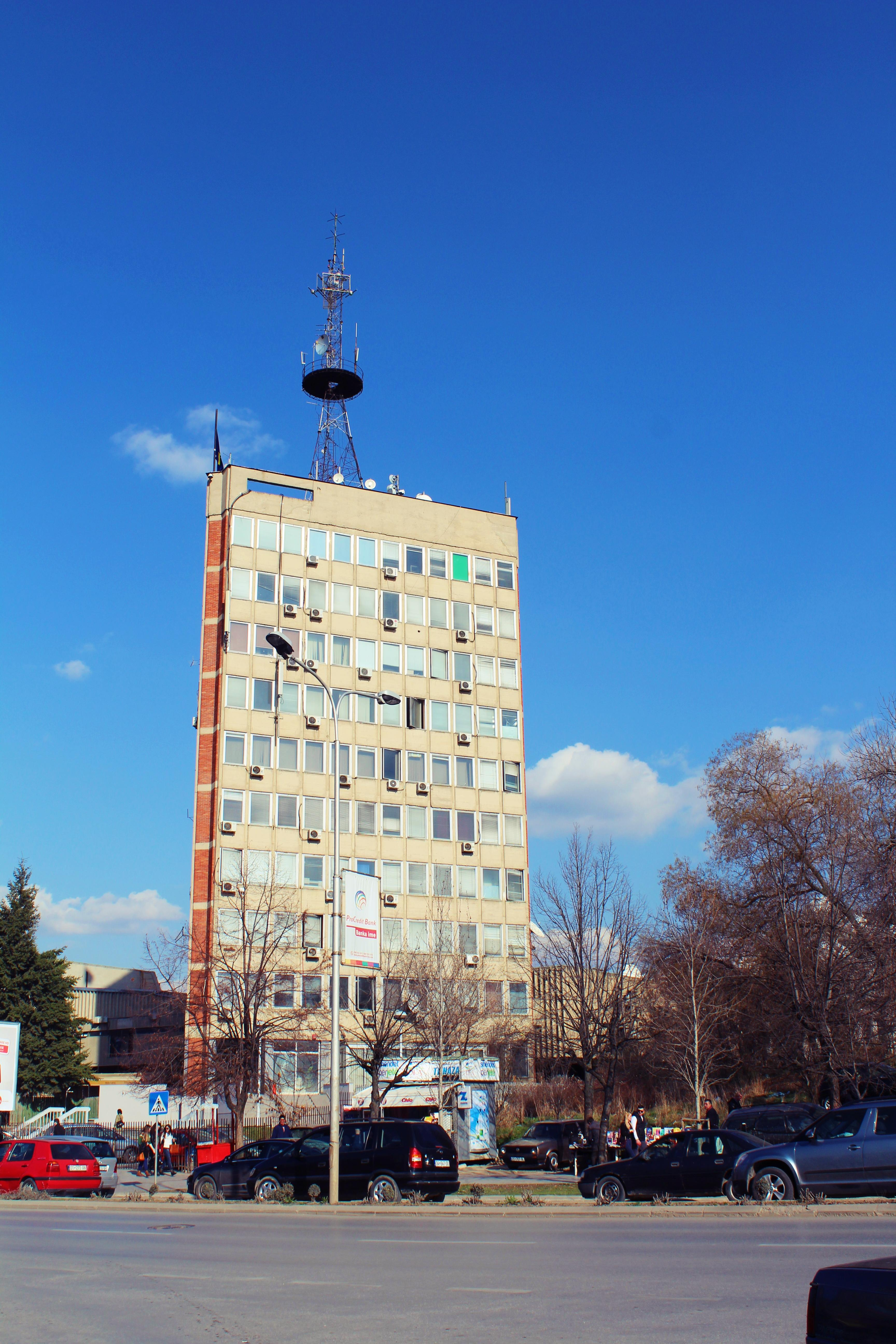
Building of Public television of Kosova, Kohavision and Radio Kosova

The media in Pristina includes some of the most important newspapers, largest publishing houses and most prolific television studio. Pristina is the largest communications center of media in Kosova. Almost all of the major media organizations in Kosova are based in Pristina.

The television industry developed in Pristina and is a significant employer in the city's economy. The four major broadcast networks, RTK, RTV21, KTV and Klan Kosova, are all headquartered in Pristina. Radio Television of Kosova (RTK) is the only public broadcaster both in Pristina and in all of Kosova as well, who continues to be financed directly by the state. All of the daily newspapers in Pristina have a readership throughout Kosova.

An important event which affected the development of the media, is that in University of Pristina since 2005 is established the Journalism Faculty within the Faculty of Philology in which a large number of young people are registered.

Media in Pristina have followed all elections held in Kosova, especially a great impact was noted in Kosova local elections, 2013, where media dedicated most of their time in political debates, advertisements and political parties programs.

The freedom and pluralism of the media is guaranteed by the Constitution of Kosova. Censorship is forbidden, except in the cases of provocation of violence and discrimination. In according to organization Reporters without borders in 2013 Kosova was ranked in the 85th place, after a year Kosova made progress and was ranked in the 80th place.

== Newspapers ==
The first newspaper was "Rilindja" (Renaissance), which first came out on February 12, 1945 in Prizren, and was the first newspaper in Albanian inside Yugoslavia. It was initially printed in the State Printing Shop in Prizren during the issues 1 to 60. Since issue 61, it was printed in Pristina Regional Printing House of the People's Front of Yugoslavia.

In the beginning, it had only four pages, being published weekly until June 27, 1948. After that it began to be published twice a week, on Sundays and Thursdays. Then, from November 1958, it started out as a daily paper (except on Fridays). By the year 1964, it appeared every day in a 20-page standard format, while on Saturdays and holidays in a 24-32 page format. On September 5, 1990, the Serbian government banned its publication. But with the entry of NATO forces, on June 12, 1999, it appeared again, but this time with additional pages and some of them in color.

It was undoubtedly one of the major sold newspapers in the Albanian sphere. Its maximum circulation was during New Year holidays, up to 234,000 copies. In 2002, the newspaper premises were blocked by UNMIK administration, and was listed as property of Kosova Agency of Privatisation, shutting it down abruptly. Nowadays the two most popular newspapers are Koha Ditore and Kosova Sot. And in the absence of an official and impartial survey, both of them claim to be the most-read newspaper in Kosova. The newspapers use three systems of distribution, the most used system is Rilindja's system, but some newspapers, as Koha Ditore and Bota Sot, in their attempt to hide the correct information about readership, have developed their own systems of distribution.

- Express
- Bota Sot
- Koha Ditore
- Kosova Sot
- Lajm
- Epoka e re

== Magazines ==
The first writings magazines in Kosova began in the early 40th and one of the first publications was Literary magazine of Albanians "Jeta e re"(The new life) was given in the newspaper "Rilindja"(Renaissance) on July 17, 1949 as one of the most influential magazines in the country. At that time there were many other magazines quite important, which with their work were known throughout the country. Some of magazines were: The newspaper "Zani i rinisë" (The Journal of Pioneers) which in 1946 was converted into Literary magazine for children "Pioneri" (Pioneers). In 1946 magazine for cultural and social issue "Përparimi" (The Progress) which from 1955 comes as magazine for culture, Literary magazine "Jeta e re"(The New life), then health education magazine "Shëndeti" (The Health) and some others as "Ndërtuesi" (The Builder), magazine for employees "Agimi" (The Sunrise), "Zora"-Women's Antifascist Front, "Bujku i ri"(The Young Farmer), whereas today most popular magazines are listed in this table:

Name	Content	Published
Oferta suksesi	Buying and selling	Weekly
OK. Kids	For children	Monthly
Flatra Fashion, culture	Fashion, culture	Monthly
IP Magazine	Politics, economy, history	Monthly
Teuta	Family, culture	Monthly
Revista Kosovarja	Fun, entertainment	Monthly
Ekonomia	Economy, business	Monthly
Metafora	Literature	Monthly
Sofra	Traditional Cooking	Monthly
Etika	Religious	Monthly
Kosova Boxing	Sport magazine	Monthly

== Radio ==
Radio Pristina started transmission immediately after the World War II in Prizren 1945 (later to be transferred to Pristina) and it was founded by Parliament of Kosovo province. Radio transmitted in Albanian, Serbian and Turkish language. October 1999 OSCE transfers the resurrected public radio station Radio Pristina to RTK. It is re-launched as Radio Kosovo. Radio Kosova is the first radio that transmitted news in English language, news edition called 'Live at Five' is still transmitted at 17:00.

=== Radio stations ===
Broadcaster	Location	Frequency	Coverage	Main language	Others languages	Address
Radio 21	Pristina	100.2	National	Albanian	No	Palace of Media/Annex 2
Radio KOSOVA 1	Pristina	101.7	National	Albanian	Serbian and Turkish	Str."Nena Tereze" n.n
Radio KOSOVA 2	Pristina	97.7	National	Albanian	Bosnian and Turkish	Str."Nena Tereze"n.n
Radio KENT FM	Pristina	95.2	Local	Turkish	No	Bregu i diellit, Mati 1
Radio KOSOVA E LIRË	Pristina	94.2	Local	Albanian	No	Str."Thimi Mitko" no.6
Radio PLUS	Pristina	102.2	Local	Albanian	No	Str."Gazmend Zajmi" no.4
Radio URBAN FM	Pristina	103.5	Local	Albanian	No	Str."Garibaldi, entrance" 5 no.11
TOP KOSOVA Radio	Pristina	91.1	Local	Albanian	No	Industrial zone
Radio VALA RINORE	Pristina	94.7	Local	Albanian	No	Str."Eqrem Qabej" no.1

== Television ==
Logo of RTP (1974-1990)

Television in Pristina has its beginnings on 26 November 1975, Radio Television of Pristina or RTP (Albanian: Radio Televizioni i Prishtinës, Serbian: Радио-телевизија Приштина, Radio-televizija Priština) was the first Albanian television channel in Kosova, and it was part of JRT and had its building in Kosova's capital Pristina (then a Yugoslav Autonomous Province). Both radio and television transmitted in Albanian, Serbian and Turkish language. Television discontinued transmission on 10 June 1999 and was relocated to Central Serbia, later it was dissolved. After the Kosova war, material and buildings of Radio Television Pristina are under the administration of Radio Television of Kosova, and have been established two other television RTV21 and KTV .

=== List of TV stations ===
Broadcaster	Location	Frequency	SR	Coverage	Main language	Other languages	Address
RTK 1	Pristina	12633 V	4883	National	Albanian	Serbian, Turkish, Bosnian and Roma	Str. "Xhemail Prishtina" no. 12
RTK 2	Pristina	12633 V	4883	National	Serbian	Turkish, Bosnian and Roma	Str. "Xhemail Prishtina" no. 12
KTV	Pristina	10762 H	27500	National	Albanian	No	The square "Nëna Terezë"
RTV21	Pristina	10762 H	27500	National	Albanian	No	Palace of Media, annex II
KLAN KOSOVA	Pristina	10804 H	30000	National	Albanian	No	Ish fabrika e Amortizatorëve
RROKUM TV	Pristina	-	-	National	Albanian	No	Str"Garibaldi", no.17
RTV DUKAGJINI	Pristina	10889 H	30000	National	Albanian	No	Str. "Gjergj Fishta",

=== Cable and Internet ===
Internet coverage is widespread but it experiences frequent outages. As of December 2013, the number of internet subscribers was 156,408 or 52.65% household penetration rate. In an effort to harmonize existing audiovisual media legislation with EU directives, Kosova's Independent Media Commission (IMC) issued regulations on licensing fees, cable operators, and protection of minors. Expansion of cable operators increased media diversity by bringing local and national TV stations, as well as special cable stations, to the public.

The following are some of the main internet providers:

- IPKO

IPKO logoo

Established in 1999, IPKO has grown from being the first Kosovo-wide Internet provider to becoming a modern enterprise offering full range of integrated services as well as content, in mobile communications, fixed telephony, digital cable television, Internet services as well as media.

IPKO has the largest land-line-fix network in Kosovo with 230.000 ports available.

Address: IPKO Telecommunications LLC, Zyra Qendrore, Lagjja Ulpiana, Str. "Zija Shemsiu", No. 34, Pristina.

- TiK TV

Telecom of Kosovo is the only public operator. Technical and customer care: 1699(free).

Address: Dardania, Pristina, Kosovo

- Kujtesa

Kujtesa - logo

Established in 1995, but only after the Kosovo war, Kujtesa starts to offer internet services and to implement local networks.

The network of Kujtesa include more thane 90% of Kosovo's territory. Technical and customer care: +381 38 22 55 99.

Address: Str.Pashko Vasa, #18, Pristina, Kosovo

- Artmotion

Artmotion is the newest cable and internet operator in Kosovo and its network area is growing.

== Online media ==
Magazines

- Oferta Suksesi
- OK. Kids
- Flatra
- IP Magazine
- Teuta
- Revista Kosovarja
- Ekonomia
- Metafora
- Sofra
- Etika
- Kosova Boxing

Newspapers

- Bota Sot
- Koha Ditore
- Kosova Sot
- Zëri
- Epoka e Re
- Gazeta Tribuna

Portals

- ofertasuksesi.com
- Telegrafi
- KohaNet
- Indeksonline
- LajmiNet
- Gazeta Express
- Kosovapress
- Teleshkronja Post
- Kosovo Spectator

Televisions

- RTK
- RTV 21
- KTV
- Klan Kosova
- Rrokum TV
