= Mass media in Kosovo =

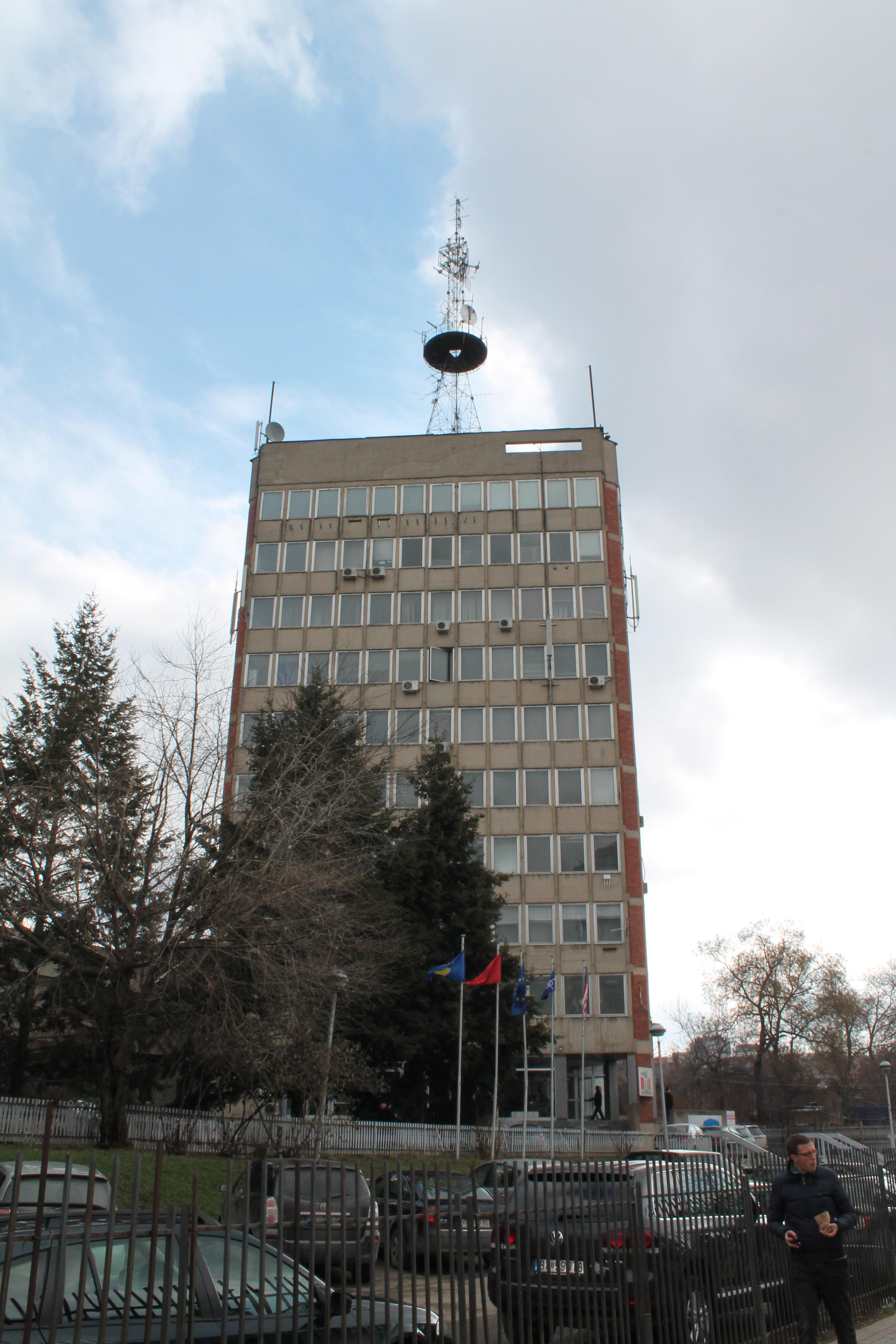
Building of Public television of Kosovo, Kohavision and Radio Kosova

The mass media in Kosovo consists of different kinds of communicative media such as radio, television, newspapers, and internet web sites. Most of the media survive from advertising and subscriptions.

Kosovo's Constitution and laws provide for freedom of expression and press freedom. Yet, these are often at stake due to political and economic interferences, fostered by media ownership concentration.

== History ==
In 2016, Reporters Without Borders ranked Kosovo in 90th place in its World Press Freedom Index, down three places from 2015 when it was in 87th place. In 2013, Kosovo was ranked in 85th place, below the average of the Western Balkan and far away from the countries of European Union. This was a slight progress from the 86th place of 2012.

== Legislative framework ==
The legal framework of Kosovo is deemed relatively good. The Constitution of Kosovo protects freedom of expression and media freedom.

Defamation and libel are decriminalised, but author, editor, and publisher may be liable for damages. The Criminal Code regulates hate speech. There is no special protection for state officials. Before going to court, the person seeking damages has to try with the publisher or with the appropriate regulatory body. A negative note is that journalists may face civil proceedings for defamation without support by their media outlets. Also, in defamation and insult cases the burden of proof is on the defendant, namely the journalist.

Censorship is forbidden, except in the cases of provocation of violence and discrimination.

A law on the protection of journalistic sources was passed in 2013 by the Kosovo parliament, based on Belgian standards, deemed among the most advanced in Europe.

The 2010 Law on Access to Public Documents guarantees access to information to official documents maintained, drawn or received by the public institutions. Applicants must submit a written request for the information that they wish to access. Each ministry has an official that is tasked with dealing with access requests, though implementation is uneven and overloaded courts are not a viable avenue for redress.

Online content is not regulated by law in Kosovo, besides generally applicable norms. The 2013 Code of the Press Council of Kosovo includes guidelines for online journalism, e.g. on responsibility for monitoring and control over published materials.

Kosovo media are free to enter the market freely, although the licensing system - and the politicisation of the Independent Media Commission (IMC) may be a hurdle.

There remain concerns about hate speech and defamation in the media. In September 2013, three persons were indicted for hate speech after protests against the Kosovo 2.0 print magazine issue entitled "Sex", which included content addressing LGBT issues.

The main issue with Kosovo's legislation, rather than its broad alignment with EU standards, is its uneven implementation, due to the lack of experience of the policy and judiciary and the challenges of interpreting a fragmented anc growing corpus of laws.

=== Status and self-regulation of journalists ===
A definition of journalist was provided in the 2013 Law on the Protection of Sources. It defines a journalist as "each natural or legal person, who is engaged regularly or professionally to contribute directly in the gathering, editing, production and dissemination of information to the public through the media".

The Association of Professional Journalists records around 20 cases annually of intimidation or threats against journalists, although physical threats violent attacks have not been recorded. Job security for journalists is not guaranteed, and cases of breach of contracts are often not reported to the authorities or to the public for fear of losing the job. Freedom House concluded in 2015 that "journalists have few professional rights, earn low wages, and often work without contracts, leaving them vulnerable to corruption and prone to self-censorship"

Two codes of ethics regulate the profession: the Kosovo Press Council's 2005 Code of Ethics, and the Independent Media Commission's 2010 Code of Ethics. Yet, the journalists' knowledge of media legislation is rather low. Investigative journalism is mostly lacking, as journalists end up reporting on protocol news, and no media has dedicated lawyers.

Journalists and editors are exempted from requirements to testify, according to the 2013 Criminal Procedure Code. They also have the right not to reveal their sources, except if necessary to prevent serious threats possibly leading to death, according to the 2013 Law on the Protection of Sources.

The Kosovo Press Council (KPC) is the self-regulatory body of the press, composed of 18 members from print and online media. It deals with around 100 claims per year, and its decisions are respected and published - though not self-executive. It is not yet financially sustainable and relies on foreign donors. It also has to face the issue of adjudicating on online media, particularly copyright and privacy violations, and hate speech.

Self-censorship is on the rise, due to the "permeability of editorial independence in the face of advertisers, political pressure through the close links between media owners and politicians and the global dwindling media revenues, particularly in the written press", according to the Kosovo NGO INDEP

Although several journalists' associations exist, there is no officially recognised professional trade union.

In May 2016, a Freedom of Expression, Media and Information report was published by Çohu!, Kosovo 2.0 and KPC which used the European Council's 27 Indicators for Media in a Democracy. It found that "While some progress has been made over the years, overall challenges remain with regard to freedom of expression and information, the legislative and regulatory framework, and independence, to ensure freedom of expression, information and media."

== Media outlets ==
According to IREX there were 92 radio stations and 22 television stations in Kosovo in 2012.

Media ownership is not regulated by law, but it was deemed "transparent" by the INDEP institute in 2012. Private print and broadcast media have to register with the Kosovo Business Registration Agency and disclose their ownership structure. The Independent Media Commission requires media companies to send it annual ownership reports and to disclose the same information with tax authorities. Anyway, media that are not registered as companies have no such legal requirement. Although ownership transparency rules are effective, the real backers of several print media remain opaque.

Media ownership is mainly local, as no foreign investor operates on the market. Media ownership concentration is very strong, according to the 2014 European Commission progress report.

Commercial media are mostly funded through advertisement revenues. Dependence on big advertisers - particularly the public or state-owned ones - often leads media to self-censorship when their interests are at stake. The state only provides small funding for minority media. In the analysis of advertising market in the Republic of Kosovo by Independent Media Commission 44% of the budget of public companies goes for advertisements in national televisions, 10% in local televisions, 8% in national radios, 9% in local radios, 11% for daily newspapers and 18% for other media. Kosovo lacks strong private advertisers, thus leaving private advertisers dependent on foreign donors. Most media outlets remain financially unsustainable, and operate only thanks to political or business supporters.

The 2008 financial crisis greatly affected Kosovo media; two daily newspapers closed in 2012, resulting in job losses and lack of job security for journalists. Yet, media close to political interests seem to withstand the crisis better and to secure advertisement funds more easily.

=== Public service broadcaster ===
The public service broadcaster is Radio Television of Kosovo, RTK, regulated by the Law on Public Broadcasting. Its financing was originally guaranteed by a license fee paid over electricity bill, until the Constitutional Court declared that it was not due and shifted RTK's budget over state subsidy (0.7% of Kosovo's budget). The change raised concerns for the preservation of RTK's independence. The legal requirement for RTK to plan an end to the transitional state budget funding has not been enacted.

RTK has been criticised for lack of investigative journalism and political bias, e.g. in the extensive coverage of the ruling political party (including the annual meeting of the ruling Kosovo Democratic Party) as opposed to the short and misleading coverage of opposition Vetvendosje 2012 protests, which was deemed "a major signal of state financing putting the editorial independence of public television at risk" (IREX, 2013b). Moreover, RTK coverage only reaches 62.7% of Kosovo's territory RTK Board members are elected by the Parliament by majority vote, thus entrusting their appointment to the majority parties. Political pressures aside, RTK maintains an untapped potential thanks to good equipment and professional editors and journalists.

=== Print media ===
In Kosovo there are several operating newspapers. They include:

- The Kosovo Spectator ('Independent') - English language
- Revista Kosovarja is a magazine published in Kosovo. It was founded on October 24, 1971
- Kosova Press ('Independent News Agency KosovaPress') is first News Agency on Kosovo. The news agency Kosova Press was established on January 4, 1999. Since that time, it has published information in these languages: Albanian, English, German and French. It currently publishes in Albanian and English.
- Koha Ditore ('Daily Time'), the only newspaper published before 1999, remains the leading daily newspaper. Its founder and owner Veton Surroi founded the Reformist Party ORA (now part of LDK), and the newspaper is run by his sister Flaka Surroi.
- Gazeta Express ('Express newspaper') was established in 2005 as an independent daily, financed by IPKO, Kosovo's leading private telecommunications company. In tabloid format, it is known for its distinctive editorials and op-ed's, as well as focus on investigative journalism.
- Arbresh ('Portali arbresh')is a Kosovo newsportal
- Infopress
- Bota Sot ('World Today'). Headquartered in Zurich, it launched as the newspaper of the Kosovo diaspora in Switzerland. Its editorial line supported the Democratic Party of Albania and the Democratic League of Kosovo.
- InfoKosova ('Portali InfoKosova') is a Kosovo newsportal
- Bota Press ('World Press') Pro-LDK.
- Epoka e Re ('The New Epoch'), established in 1999.
- Kosova Sot ('Kosovo Today') independent. Claims to have the highest circulation.
- Lajm ('News'), est. 2004, pro-AKR, owned by the businessman and politician Behgjet Pacolli.
- Tribuna ('The Tribune')
- Zëri ('The Voice'), owned by Blerim Shala, an analyst and journalist who also took part in the Kosovo status process negotiations
- Teleshkronja Post News and Media website based in Drenas (Ex-Glogoc) owned by Teleshkronja Post news company, founded date: 26 November 2017.
- Kosova24 ('Kosova 24') is an independent newsmedia based in Prizren owned by Kosova 24 SH.P.K., founded date: 13 May 2020.

Express, a newspaper best known for its front page on the day when Kosovo declared independence, since March 22, 2013 exists only online.

According to OSCE there are between 25.000-35.000 copies sold every day, which is a low number compared with Kosovo's population (around 2 million).

=== Radio broadcasting ===
There are six nationwide radio channels in Kosovo: Radio Kosova (part of RTK), Radio Blue Sky, Radio 21, Radio Dukagjini, and Radio K4 (the latter broadcasting in both Albanian and Serbian). There are then five regional-coverage channels (Radio BESA, 92.1 Capital FM, Radio HELIX, Radio MITROVICA, and Radio PULS - the latter in Serbian), and several local ones.

As the Kosovo Media Institute pointed out in 2010, local radios have a significantly larger share of the audience in comparison with national radios – 60.76% for local radios in comparison to 33.54% for national radio emitters (5.68% are for foreign and/or other radio stations). Likewise, there are around 30 radio stations in Kosovo that have the highest obedience in the regions where they operate

=== Television broadcasting ===
Television in Kosovo was first introduced in 1975. 92% of households in Kosovo have a television nowadays. TV remains the main source of information for most Kosovo residents.

The nationwide TV broadcasters in Kosovo are Radio Television of Kosovo (RTK), with four channels; Radio Television 21 (RTV21), Kohavision (KTV) and Klan Kosova. The public service broadcaster in Kosovo is RTK, which is subsidized by the government and also receives money from advertisement. The law obliges RTK to broadcast programs in Albanian and in Serbian language too. According to IREX, a nonprofit organization, insufficient market research and data on broadcasting ratings which are considered unreliable contribute to an overall unfavorable business environment for media organizations.

=== Telecommunications ===
The fixed telephony penetration rate in Kosovo is among the lowest in Europe, with 4.48 lines per 100 inhabitants. On the other hand, mobile telephony has boomed. In 2007, PTK reported growth of subscribers from 300,000 to 800,000 in less than a year. In 2010, 74 percent of the population was subscribed to mobile phone services, or a total number of 1,537,164 GSM-services in Kosovo are provided currently by Vala Mobile, a subsidiary of PTK (initially using the +377 Monaco prefix), and by IPKO (Si Mobitel), a company owned by Telekom Slovenije, which has acquired the second mobile operator license in Kosovo and has started operations in late 2007 (initially using the +386 Slovenia prefix). A Kosovo-specific +383 country calling code is in the process of being established. Three virtual operators existed during the years between 2000 and 2020: D3 Mobile (owned by Dukagjini Group), Z Mobile (defunct, numbers transferred to Kosovo Telecom), Zog Mobile (defunct, owned by IPKO).

=== Internet ===
Around 84% of Kosovo residents have access to internet, which is not restricted by the authorities.

In the last years web portals have become very important source of information. According to Kosovo Association of Information and Communication Technology 72.1% of households in Kosovo have access on the internet and the number of internet users is constantly growing.

As IREX points out, web news portals are constantly becoming more useful and attractive, in proportion with the growing of the internet usage. Telegrafi.com is an online news portal which is visited by more than 60.000 people each day. There are also other web news portals such as Koha.net, Gazeta Express, Kosova Press, Kosova24, Teleshkronja Post and so on.

Internet coverage is widespread but it experiences frequent outages. As of September 2010, the number of internet subscribers was 105,061 or 35.02% household penetration rate.

== Media organisations ==
The Independent Media Commission regulates the range of broadcasting frequencies in the Republic of Kosovo and other related issues.

In order for the media to start broadcasting they should have the license issued by Independent Media Commission. The license is renewed every seven years for radio broadcasts and every ten years for audiovisual media services.

The Association of Independent Broadcast Media of Kosovo (AMPEK) represents the interests of leading commercial broadcasters in Kosovo. Their role is to protect and to promote the interests of the Kosovo's private broadcasters.

Press Council of Kosovo is a self-regulatory body founded for and by the print media sector in Kosovo. Its mission is based on the convictions of the Press Code of Kosovo. PCK is established in September, 2005 with the help of OSCE Mission in Kosovo, however, the office of PCK has started its activity in December, 2005.

=== Regulatory authorities ===
Electronic media are regulated by the Independent Media Commission (IMC), established by law as an "independent body for regulation, management, and oversight of the broadcasting frequency spectrum". Yet, its composition and functioning remain under political influence. The IMC members are elected by the Kosovo Parliament, and are thus affiliated to the ruling political parties. The IMC board thus risks blocking civil servants' agenda for political reasons. The new IMC Board Chairman failed to disclose its previous activities in local government, which would have disqualified him from eligibility.

== Censorship and media freedom ==
In 2016, Freedom House scored Kosovo as "partly free", with an overall score of 49 (where 0 is the best and 100 the worst). The organisation recorded the persistence of political interference, financial pressures, and high media ownership concentration.

Minority issues are often neglected in the media, and at most limited to Kosovo Serbs. RTK started a Serbian-language cable channel RTK 2 in June 2013.

=== Attacks and threats against journalists ===
Journalists in Kosovo face recurrent threats and attacks. The backlogs of judicial courts and the flaws in the judiciary (with inefficient prosecutions) lead to delayed investigations.

The Association of Professional Journalists records around 20 cases annually of intimidation or threats against journalists, although physical threats violent attacks have not been recorded. The Association of Professional Journalists of Kosovo (APIK) recorded 22 cases of threats and physical assaults against journalists in 2014, on the rise from the previous years; AGK documented 25 cases in the same year. Although perpetrators are known, investigations tend to lag behind. Only one case was solved in 2012-14, resulting in a low fine. HRW checked 63 claims of threats, of which only one (Life in Kosovo) had led to prosecution and finally acquittal. The Kosovo interior minister Bajram Rexhepi told HRW in 2014 that they take crimes against journalists seriously and that the police is doing a good job, shifting the blame towards prosecutors and the judiciary. He also suggested that journalists share a part of the blame, as "not all journalists respect the ethical code". The police told HRW that they do not differentiate among victims, but that cases involving vulnerable groups (journalists, children, women, minorities) are treated as priority.

In 2015 AGK in cooperation with OSCE reported 27 death threats against journalists. According to data by Kosovo police the same year there were 24 cases of attacks and threats reported by journalists. In recent years several threats were received by journalists covering Islamic fundamentalism. Convictions for attacks and threats against journalists are still uncommon.

- Jeta Xharra, chief editor at Life in Kosovo TV show, complained in 2009 against the major of Skenderaj for death threats. The EULEX prosecutor acted upon the police complaint only three years after. The courts then dismissed the case based on statutes of limitation.
- Vehbi Kajtazi, journalist at Koha Ditore, got a death threat in 2011 from the former dean of Prizren university and adviser to the Kosovo government, after he having exposed corruption involving him. The prosecution indicted the perpetrator only in November 2013. Kajtazi reported about 15 threats to the police, finally concluding that it was useless to do so.
- Journalists reporting on religious radicalism often complain of online threats. The Kosovo Police set up a cybercrime unit in late 2012. Artan Haraqija received hundreds of online threats, including death threats; the police arrested one suspect, but released him the day after and told Haraqija he had nothing to worry about.
- Arbana Xharra, chief editor of Zëri, started receiving death threats after reporting on radical religious groups in 2012 and reported them to the police, but with no consequences.
- Faton Shoshi, owner of news portal Indeksonline accused Valon Salihu, a senior official of the Kosovo Intelligence Agency (KIA) of threatening him after he published an article about the agency director. The journalist brought the case to court, but a trial scheduled for June 2015 was cancelled because of Salihu's absence.
- In June 2014 a Serbian public TV reporter, covering a festival at the Gracanica monastery, was arrested for minor traffic violations and injured while manhandled in police custody.
- On 22 June 2014 three journalists were attacked, and one was slightly injured, by protestors against a barricade dividing Kosovska Mitrovica and North Mitrovica (inhabited mainly by Kosovo Serbs).
- On 2 July 2014 Mefail Bajqinovci, a journalist running a TV show about crime on Kohavision (KTV), received a telephone threat from an unknown person at Dubrava Prison.
- The satirical TV journalist Milot Hasimja from Klan Kosova channel was stabbed several times on its workplace in November 2014. The attacker was charged with attempted murder and condemned to four years in prison.
- Zekirja Shabani, APIK president and journalist for Tribuna, was attacked by the newspaper owner Sejdi Demiri in December 2014, allegedly for his trade union activities.
- In June 2015 several bullets were shot against the office of KoSSev news portal.
- In January 2016 Gazmend Morina, a journalist of the news portal Veriu.info, was physically attacked by a member of the municipal assembly and by another person after he criticized the management of the Trepča Mines in Mitrovica South.
- Astrit Gashi, journalist of Blic news portal, accused Dardan Nuhiu, the director of the Financial Investigation Unit (FIU) of threatening him, after he published a leaked confidential document.
- In August 2016 grenades were thrown in the courtyard of Radio Television of Kosovo (RTK) headquarters. There were damages but no injury. On 28 August 2016 a bomb was set off outside the home of Mentor Shala, the head of RTK. Both the attacks were probably done by a group opposing the cession of 80 square kilometres of territory to Montenegro.
- Adem Grabovci, a politician of the Democratic Party of Kosovo, filed a lawsuit against investigative news website Insajderi, accusing it of violation of his privacy and of his constitutional rights, for publishing a story containing proof of his role in cases of alleged corruption. While the lower court dismissed the complaint, in October 2016 the Court of Appeals of Pristina overturned the decision, even giving suggestions to the plaintiff according to Reporters Without Borders.
- In October 2016 Leonard Kerquki, editor-in-chief of the Gazeta Express, received death threats, insults and libel, for having directed a documentary (part of Zona Express weekly show), accusing the Kosovo Liberation Army of having committed war crimes against civilians in the name of patriotism.

Prosecutions and convictions for crimes against journalists are rare. In March 2014 three men were convicted to two-years suspended sentences in a high-profile case related to a 30-people storming of the launch of a Kosovo 2.0 issue on LGBT rights and gender issues.

=== Political interferences ===
"Political intimidation can thrive" in Kosovo, the OSCE concluded in June 2014, due to the small size of the country and the dependency of media professionals on public employment. Advertising and fundings are seen as the primary avenues for direct or indirect pressures on media outlets. The public service broadcaster RTK is particularly vulnerable to direct and indirect political interference, often seen as "a mouthpiece of the government".

Journalists that are critical of public officials are at risk of being denounced as traitors or "Serbian spies". Stories critical of government have been obstructed by editors, and some journalists have been threatened with dismissal. Non-aligned media outlets have been intimidated with tax inspections or have had their access to public information obstructed.

- The Association of Journalists of Kosovo (AGK) complained about verbal threats and obstruction against journalists by government officials, business interests and media owners.
- In May 2014 the AGK chairwoman resigned due to allegations of improper connections with the ruling PDK party.
- In October 2014 a Koha Ditore reporter complained of threats of prosecution from EULEX officials if he had refused to hand over documents allegedly implicating EULEX in corruption activities.
- Jeta Xharra complained that her TV show Life in Kosovo on the public channel RTK, airing since 2005, had its airtime cut for political reasons and was replaced by lower-league soccer games. The budget for investigative journalism on RTK had already been proposed for cuts in 2009, but this was later avoided by the Parliament. The show has not received due payments from RTK from late 2013 to November 2014 (and possibly further), endangering its financial security. "Public TV is exercising pressure by not paying for the programs containing our production", Xharra told HRW.

On 26 March 2015 journalists and trade union's members Arsim Halili and Fadil Hoxha were fired from the Radio Television of Kosovo (RTK) by the general director Mentor Shala after they had publicly asked to the television to stop following a "political agenda". 60 of the broadcaster top editors and journalists confirmed the accusation of their colleagues. Reporters Without Borders expressed concern. Later 80 journalists (10% of the staff) protested in front of the television's offices.

=== Smear campaigns ===
A reporter at Life in Kosovo was subject to a 12-days smear campaign by the daily Infopress, calling her a Serbian spy and asking for her to be punished, after she reported on local politics in Skenderaj in 2009–2010. She later left journalism due to pressures. The five Infopress columnists who had threatened her were acquitted in 2013, with the court establishing that the op-eds did not constitute a threat.

== Media ownership ==
=== Transparency ===
Transparency of media ownership refers to the public availability of accurate, comprehensive and up-to-date information about media ownership structures. A legal regime guaranteeing transparency of media ownership makes possible for the public as well as for media authorities to find out who effectively owns, controls and influences the media as well as media influence on political parties or state bodies.

According to a study carried out within the South East European Media Observatory, the lack of transparency in media ownership and in the financial flows for the media is one of the major problem affecting the media system in Kosovo. In the 2016 progress report, the European Commission (EC) expressed worries about the lack of transparency regarding media ownership in Kosovo. The implementation of measures to provide for transparent information on media ownership is among the recommendations made by the EC for the years to come. This situation is a consequence of the existing legal vacuum in the field. The scarce available data on media ownership and finances are badly reliable. Current legislation does not address the issue of media ownership transparency and concentration. These issues were not dealt with by the first provisional media regulations adopted by UNMIK in 2000, so that de facto the issue was left to the authority of the Temporary Media Commissioner. The Independent Media Commission database usually contains the names of media owners. In some cases, only the names of contact persons are disclosed. Private media are registered to the Kosovo Business Registration Agency according to the law regulating businesses transparency. If in the case of print media, the owners are de facto largely known due to the fact that they publish information about ownership and editorial staff, and to the small size of the market and social interaction, this does not apply to electronic media which sector lacks proper regulation resulting in the complete lack of registration and of information on ownership, finances and human resources. The problem of lack of transparency of online media has further augmented with the explosion of digital media market. A 2014 study that examined ownership transparency of eight news portals found out that none of them made publicly available information on ownership, only two published the names of the editors-in-chief, two provided information on the staff working in the media, and six offered information on the address of the outlet. According to some experts, this has contributed to an environment enabling fictive online portals to be established as political propaganda tools and to exert pressure on professional media outlets. The television and broadcast sector also remains heavily problematic in terms of media ownership transparency. Media analysts have thus raised concern on who exactly owns and controls the media in Kosovo, behind the nominal owners. This situation makes possible to identify a specific ownership pattern in Kosovo media system, which takes the shape of hidden ownership and nominal owners as a cover for actual owners. Experts find this fact suspicious and alarming.

=== Concentration and pluralism ===
There are many media outlets in Kosovo but the concentration of ownership is increasing, often in a non-transparent way. This, together with direct and indirect political and financial pressures and interference, creates repercussions on journalist and editors, with overall issues for the independence of the media sector.

Regulations and data

Since current media legislation does not cover media ownership transparency and concentration limited data are available and they are mostly unreliable. There also no reliable data on audience share of radio, television and newspapers. The advertising market is also not regulated and not transparent. Market research is also underdeveloped.

Development after 1999

Pluralistic media developed in Kosovo only after 1999. Ownership still changes often, and so does the way in which ownership influences journalism.

Most of the existing media were launched or supported by international donors. E.g. USAID and the Open Society Institute (OSI) -now Open Society Foundations (OSF)- Media Program provided funding for televisions RTV21, Kohavision, newspaper Kosova Sot. OSI also supported Koha Ditore. Since they were dependent on donors' money, when the flow was reduced many media found themselves in a difficult situation.

Models and patterns of ownership

Different models of ownership emerged.

One is economic ownership. Some big companies own media and use them not as business by themselves, but for the interests of pre-existing business, or even to protect them from media.

Another one is political ownership. Political parties, members of political parties or individual supporting them have launched or bought media (many newspapers, and recently also television channels), and use them to gain party and political power.

State advertising makes for the largest part of advertising revenue, and it has been used to support pro-government newspapers or influence editorial policies.

Advocacy media are often registered as non-governmental organizations. They are most likely to be internationally funded, which allow them to work without market pressure.

Recently there has been a flourishing of small independent news portals. This is a new model of ownership that adds to the pluralism, but quality is often low, and some practice copy-pasting.

There is also a pattern of hidden ownership, both by political and business groups. Some private owners are family businesses.

Advertising market

The fact that the advertising market is not regulated nor transparent is cited as a reason for the lack of interest by foreign media owners

Currently advertising industry is considered insufficient to fund all existing media, let alone supporting their growth.

==== Main media owners ====
Saraçini-Kelmendi family

Afërdita Saraçini-Kelmendi, her husband Florin Kelmendi, and her brother Eugen Saraçini, controls Company 21, owning TV21, Radio 21 and other media outlets.

Surroi family

Flaka Surroi owns the Koha Group, after her brother Veton Surroi transmitted it to her in 2004. It includes Kohavision (KTV), Arta TV, Koha Ditore, and other outlets.

Devolli Corporation

In 2014 it was claimed that Devolli Corporation became the owner of the 40% of Klan Kosova, but it was not possible to confirm or refute the news.

Lluka family

Ekrem Lluka "is the owner of the Dukagjini Group, which includes TV Dukagjini, Radio Dukagjini, Insurance Company, Slovenian-Kosovo Pension Fund, the mobile telephony business D3 Mobile, two hydro power plants in Albania, hotels, a hospital, a printing plant, a publishing house, the Tobacco import and distribution network, Birra Peja, etc." His son Gent Lluka is the owner of Telegrafi.com, "the second ranking news portal in Kosovo and Albania".

Public service broadcaster

Radio Television of Kosovo (RTK) is the public service broadcaster. It offers four television channels, two radio stations and a web portal. It is funded by the state (with additional funds from advertising) and it has been accused of not being balanced.

== See also ==
- Access to public information in Kosovo
