= Television in Kosovo =

Television in Kosovo was first introduced in 1974. The Radio Television of Pristina was the first Albanian-speaking broadcaster in Kosovo, founded in 1974 following Radio Pristina's founding in 1945. It was forcefully shut down in 1990 by the Yugoslavian government, forbidding the flow of information through Kosovan airwaves during the Kosovo War. In wartime, the information blackout was covered by Radio 21 (in exile via internet radio and the BBC World Service) and Koha Ditore (via its newspaper and an English-language website), while television was under the sole ownership of the Radio Television of Serbia.

In 1999, the Radio Television of Pristina was reformed into the Radio Television of Kosovo (RTK), founded with the help of the European Broadcasting Union (which it awaits membership into). Besides RTK, the end of the war brought along the creation of national private television networks such as Kohavision (a sister to Koha Ditore), RTV21 (expanding from Radio 21), and many others. In the mid-2000s, RTK partnered with IPTV companies like TVALB to expand its coverage to countries in Europe and North America. These efforts would go further in 2009 with RTV21's 21WorldTV cable service, which offered services to Albanians in the United States. For most of Kosovo's history in television, RTK, RTV21, and Kohavision are the most watched broadcasters in the country.^{:21}

The introduction of cable television through ISPs greatly increased the capacity of television coverage starting in the 2010s with companies bringing programming from Albania and foreign channels to Kosovo. According to a 2013 study by the Independent Media Commission, more than half of Kosovo receives their television signal through cable.^{:18}

Below is a list of television networks and channels with national, regional and cable coverage in Kosovo.

== National frequency ==
=== Public ===
- RTK 1
- RTK 2
- RTK 3
- RTK 4
- RTK Sat

=== Private ===
- RTV21
- Kohavision
- Klan Kosova
- T7
- RTV Dukagjini
- ATV
- Kanal 10 (formerly Rrokum TV)
- TëVë 1
- First Channel
- PRO1
- Arta News

== Regional frequency ==
- A-Mol TV
- Istogu Channel
- MTV Kosova
- ON TV
- Peace TV
- Puls TV
- RTI
- RTV Besa
- RTV Fontana
- Star Plus TV
- TV Arbëria
- TV Diaspora
- TV Dielli
- TV Festina
- TV Iliria
- TV Liria
- TV Llapi
- TV Mitrovica
- TV Opinion
- TV Opoja
- TV Prizreni
- TV Syri Vision
- TV Tema
- TV Vali
- TV Vushtrria
- Televizioni Syri
- Turbo Channel
- Zico TV
- Zëri TV
- TV Klina
- TV Rahoveci
- TV Kiss
- TV Lipjani
- TV Drenica
- TV Gjilani
- TV Plus Mitrovicë
- TV Menada
- TV Dardania

=== Defunct ===
- 3TV
- A9TV
- ART
- Click Channel
- Dasma TV
- Herc TV
- Kosova Channel
- Kutia TV
- 3+HD Music
- Men TV
- Metro TV
- News TV
- Next TV
- Olti TV
- Pro Channel
- RTV Balkan
- RTV Fan
- Top Kosova
- TV Glob
- TV Most
- TV Skenderaj
- Tribuna Channel
- Visa Channel

== Company 21 ==
- RTV21
- TV 21 (North Macedonia)
- 21 Plus
- 21 Popullore
- 21 Mix
- 21 Junior
- 21 NewsBiz
- Smart World TV
- KB RTV21

== Artmotion ==
- Kino 1
- Kino 2
- Kino 3
- Doku 1
- Doku 2
- Sport 1
- Sport 2
- Sport 3
- Sport 4
- Sport 5
- Sport 6
- Episode
- Prime
- Gurmania Channel
- Beat TV
- Prince Kids
- Big Brother VIP Kosova 1
- Big Brother VIP Kosova 2

== TelKos ==
- TëVë 1
- TëVë Aksion
- TëVë Comedy
- TëVë Dramë
- TëVë Fantasy
- TëVë Novela
- TëVë Shqip
- TëVë Doku 1
- TëVë Doku 2
- TëVë Kids 1
- TëVë Kids 2

== Kujtesa ==
=== Active ===
- K Sport 1
- K Sport 2
- K Sport 3
- K Sport 4
- K Sport 5

=== Defunct ===
- K Channel
- K Film Një
- K Film Dy
- K Film Tre
- K Film Katër
- K Film Pesë
- K Doku Një
- K Doku Dy
- K Reality
- K Sofia
- K Music

== ISP Broadcast ==
- ISP Aksion
- ISP Dramë
- ISP Film
- ISP Hits
- ISP Komedi
- ISP Triller
- ISP Premiere
- ISP Musix
- ISP Mix
- ISP Nostalgjia
- ISP Popullore
- ISP Shahirat
- ISP Dokumentar
- ISP Sport
- ISP Pikëpyetje
- ISP Kalamajtë

== SuperSport ==
- SuperSport Kosova 1
- SuperSport Kosova 2
- SuperSport Kosova 3

== CineStar ==
- CineStar 1
- CineStar 2
- CineStar Premiere 1
- CineStar Premiere 2
- CineStar Action
- CineStar Fantasy
- CineStar Comedy

== TV Vala ==
- Vala Sport 1
- Vala Sport 2

== SPI International ==
- FilmBox
- FilmBox Extra
- FilmBox Plus
- FilmBox Arthouse
- FightBox
- DocuBox
- Fast&FunBox
- FashionBox
- GameToonBox

== Other channels ==
- HBO Europe
- Star Channel
- Star Movies
- Star Life
- Star Crime
- Comedy Central Extra
- Nickelodeon
- Cartoon Network
- BabyTV
- Duck TV
- AMC
- National Geographic
- Discovery Channel
- Investigation Discovery
- Science Channel
- Animal Planet
- Travel Channel
- History Channel
- 24Kitchen
- Food Network
- TLC
- Alb'swissTV
- All of Albania's channels

== Cable networks ==
- IPKO
- Artmotion
- Kujtesa
- Telecom of Kosovo
- ISP Broadcast
- TelKos
- SkyNet
