= Kosovo–Oman relations =

- Kosovo: Oman

Kosovo–Oman relations are foreign relations between Kosovo and Oman.

== History ==
Kosovo declared its independence from Serbia on 17 February 2008. There were conflicting reports on whether Oman has recognised Kosovo, or de-recognised it.

In 4 February 2011, Kosovo announced that it received a note from Oman which stated that it "will welcome Kosovo's membership to the United Nations, as well as to other international and regional organizations" and that the countries had established diplomatic relations. However, in September 2011 Kosovo's deputy Foreign Minister Petrit Selimi stated that "Oman never recognised us". Later that month, Kosovo's Ministry of Foreign Affairs announced that Oman's Foreign Minister Yusuf bin Alawi bin Abdullah had informed them of his country's recognition of Kosovo. Kosovo's chargé d'affaires in Saudi Arabia was quoted in 2012 as saying that Oman had not recognised Kosovo.

In September 2022, the foreign ministry of Oman officially issued a press release explicitly stating that the Omani foreign minister had met with the president and foreign minister of the "Republic of Kosovo", implicitly confirming that Oman does recognise the Republic of Kosovo as an independent state.

== See also ==
- Foreign relations of Kosovo
- Foreign relations of Oman
