= Selimi =

Selimi may refer to:

- Petrit Selimi (b. 1979), Kosovar activist
- Sylejman Selimi, Kosovar general
