= Kmetoc =

Kmetoc Kmetovce
- Coordinates: 42°29′31″N 21°31′40″E
- Country: Kosovo
- District: Gjilan
- Municipality: Gjilan
- Elevation: 517 m (1,696 ft)

Population (2024)
  - Total: 620
- Time zone: UTC+1
  - Summer (DST): UTC+2

Kmetoc (Serbian: Kmetovce) is a village about 7 km northeast of Gjilan, Kosovo. It is in a hilly area that divides the neighborhoods starkly.

== Neighborhoods ==
The highland areas include Kmetoci (home to the Latifi, Azizi, and Maxhuni families), Sikreshtë (or Sikireshi, home to muhaxhir families such as the Svirca-Bislimi, Mahalla, Mustafa, Osmani, Rexhepi, and Pacolli), and the lowlands where the Hoti family and the Kosovo Serbs dwell. Other neighborhoods include Llanishtë, Çukë, Rapçugë, Te Prroni, Kolibja Salihit, Arat e Gata, Prroni i Shahës, and Arat e Poshtme.

== Geography ==
The village lies in the Përlepnicë River watershed near the Miresh Gorge. At a site called Qeramidica, on the road between Gjilan and Kamenica, many old shards of terracotta pottery can be found, hinting at late antique settlement. A local cemetery in Shavarina is labeled "Roman".

== Demographics ==
In 1897, there were 30 Serb households and 15 Albanian ones, which went down by 1901 to 21 Serbs with few Albanians; by 1911, there were 26 Serb ones. The 1913 census found 307 residents, which rose to 281 in 46 households by 1921. At the beginning of 1999, there were 79 Albanian households of 675 residents, 90 Serb households with 540 residents, and 3 Roma households with 14 residents. During the ethnic cleansing of the ensuing Kosovo War, two women and one man were killed, with much of the Albanian population deported to North Macedonia.

== 14th century historical monument ==
The ruins of Saint Barbara's Church lie about 1 km southeast of town. The monument is categorized as "archaeological" and numbered 02-369/63. First dedicated to Saint Demetrius of Thessaloniki but later to Saint Barbara, it was dated in 1963 by the national heritage authority to the 13th century or at the latest the 14th century. Protected by the Regional Center for Cultural Heritage in Gjilan, the building has little presence in the written record but is linked in oral tradition with monastic activity under the Byzantine Empire. The ruins include an increasingly simple version of the patriarchal cross similar to that in the church dedicated to Saint Nicholas in the Monastery of the Holy Archangels in Prizren. A typical cross-in-square, the plan includes a dome on the west side connecting the narthex with the central nave (Greek: naos), as well as two columns on the east side. A three-sided outer apse borders the chancel. Mostly stone with some brick elements, the temple included a fresco in the northeastern corner, described as follows from the 1963 listing: “Fragments of decoration and busts of saints on a red background display show stylistic features that, together with the architecture, suggest a sophisticated construction in the 14th century.” Part of the church fell after the Battle of Kosovo, and the remainder was destroyed in the 18th century. The current reconstruction work was done from 1966 to 1968.

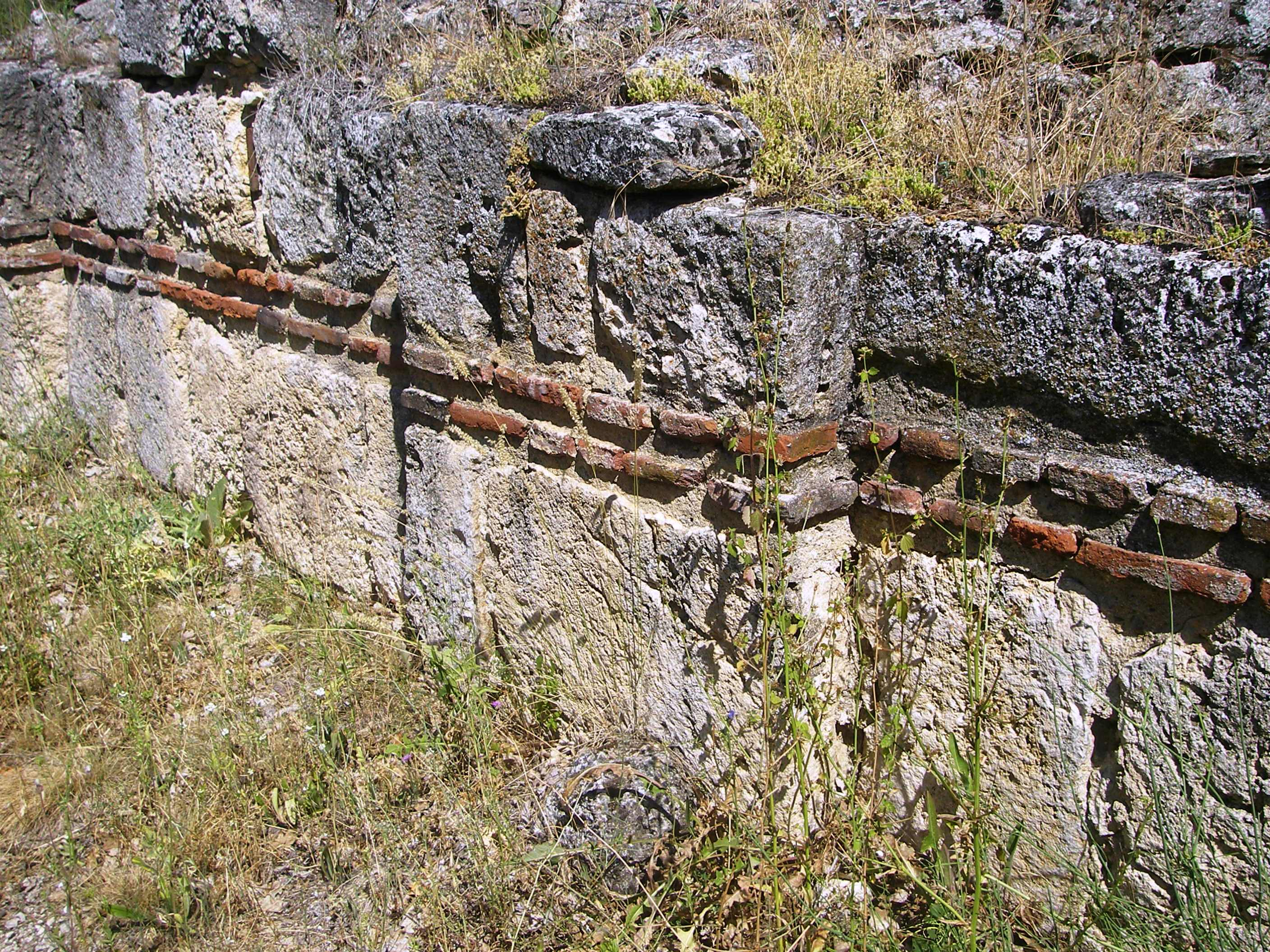
Wall detail

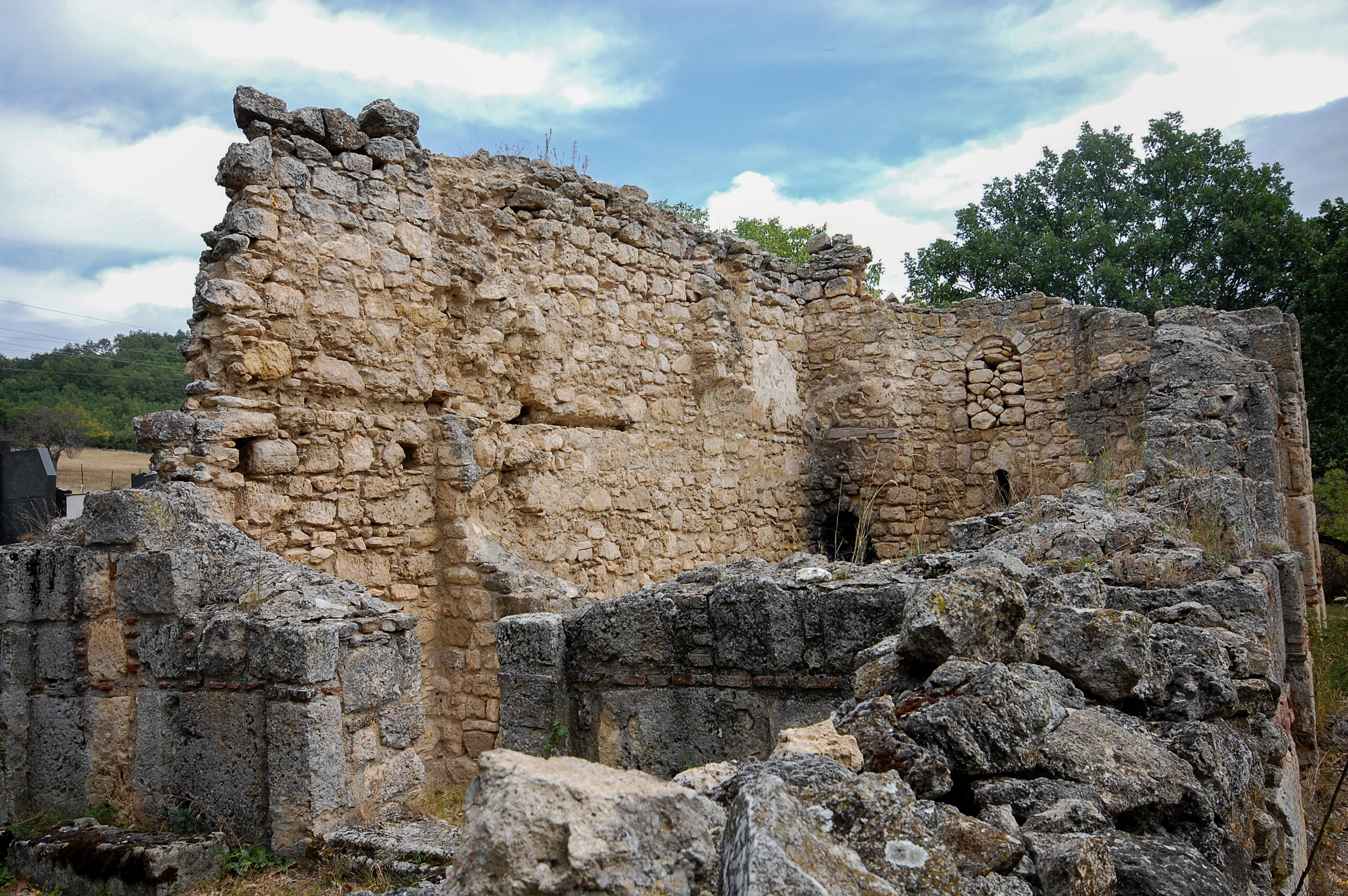
General view

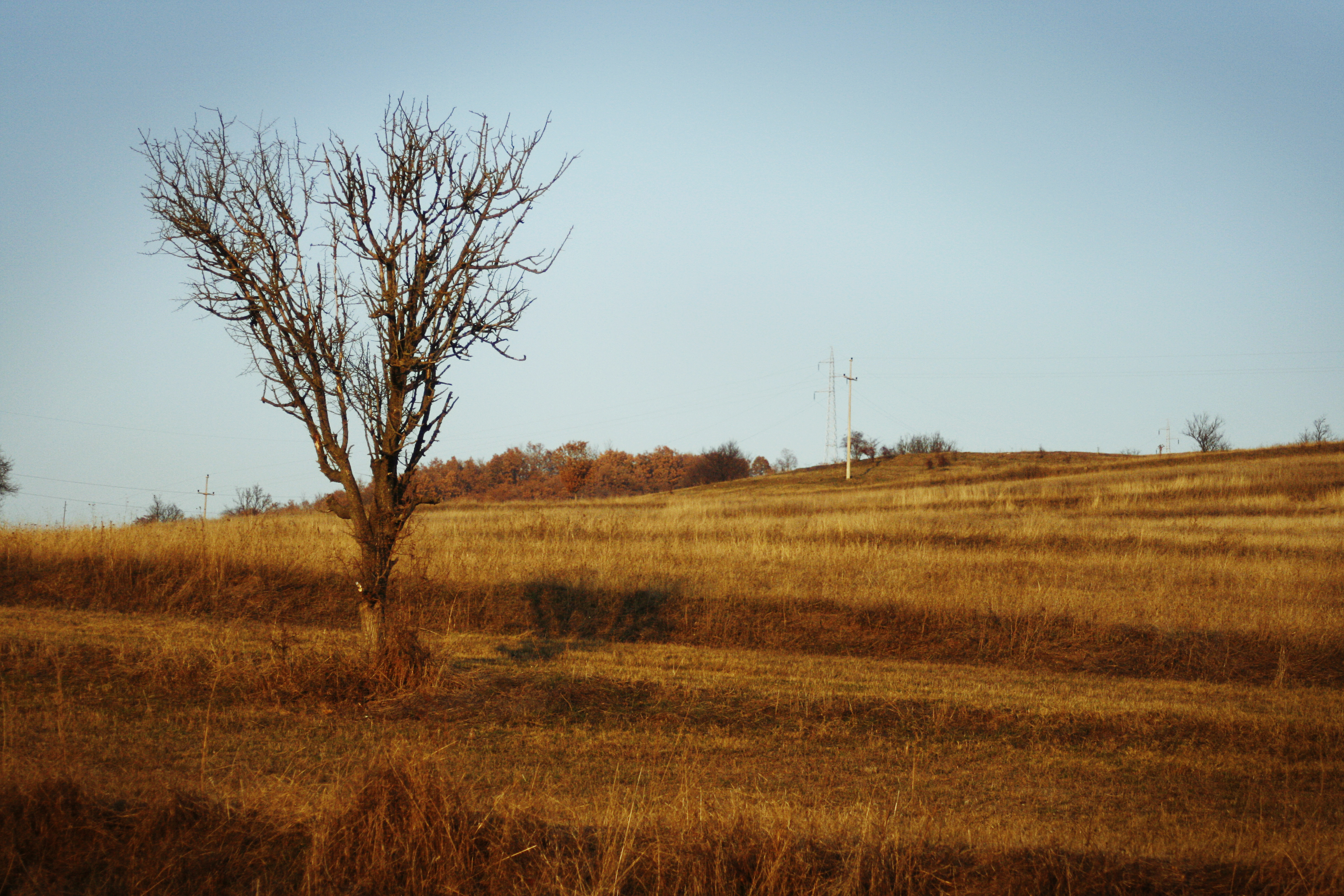
View from the Përlepnicë
