= ABC News (Albania) =

Albanian television channel

ABC
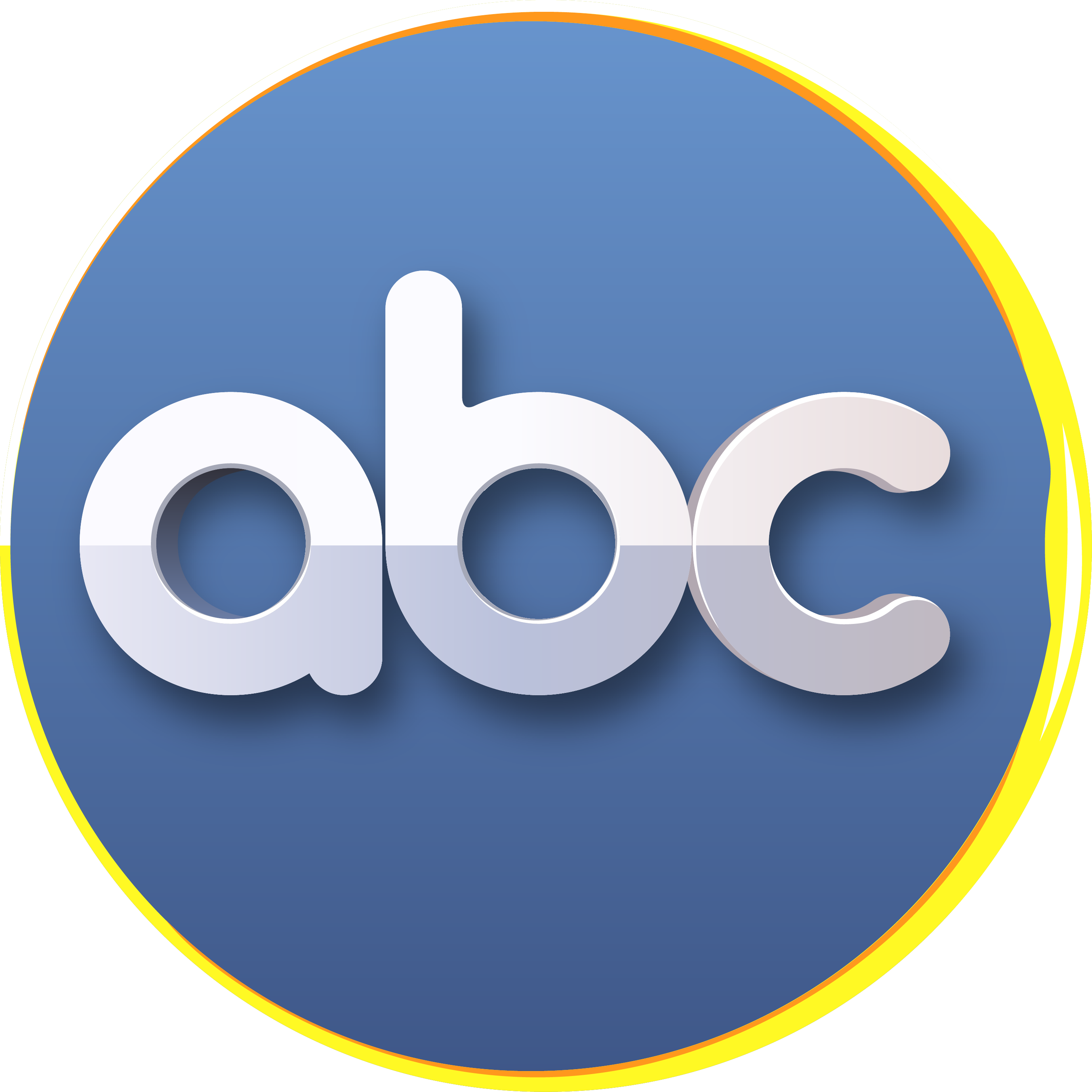
- Country: Albania
- Broadcast area: Albania

Programming
- Language: Albanian
- Picture format: 1080i HDTV (downscaled to 16:9 576i for the SDTV feed)

Ownership
- Owner: Aleksandër Frangaj (2010–2019); A.B.C. Management (2019–present)
- Sister channels: ABC News Radio; Televizioni 7 Gazeta Express

History
- Launched: 18 August 2010 (16 years ago)
- Former names: Telenorba Shqiptare

Links
- Website: abcnews.al

ABC News is an Albanian free-to-air television channel based in Tirana. It was founded in 2010 on the frequency of the defunct Italian-Albanian channel Telenorba Shqiptare and in 2019 was acquired by ABC Management sh.p.k. It is part of the ABC Media Group, together with Television 7 (T7) and Gazeta Express (gazetaexpress.com) in Kosovo.

== Programs ==
Apart from the news programs, ABC News features several programs on its channel.

Original name	Format	Origin
Log.	Political overview	Albania
Piranjat	Investigation show	Albania
Kosherja	Humor	Albania
ABC Story	Documentary	Albania
Radar	Talk show	Albania
ABC-ja e Mëngjesit	Morning show	Albania
Kutia 21	Game show	Albania
Shqiptarët per shqiptarët	Humanity show	Albania
Style Star Show	Talent show	Albania
ABC e pasdites	Talk show	Albania
ABC Live	Talk show	Albania
Bardh a Zi	Talk show	Albania
T'ka mami yll	Reality show	Albania

== See also ==
- Television in Albania
- Communication in Albania
- TV Klan
- Vizion Plus
- Tring
- Tip TV
- Klan Kosova
- Telenorba Shqiptare, defunct channel occupying same frequency
