= Rexhai Surroi =

Yugoslav Albanian journalist and diplomat

Yugoslav Ambassador to Spain
- In office 1985–1988
- Preceded by: Faik Dizdarević
- Succeeded by: Berislav Badurina

Yugoslav Ambassador to Mexico, Honduras and Costa Rica
- In office 1977–1981
- Preceded by: Branko Vukušić
- Succeeded by: Jože Brilej

Assistant Secretary of the Federal Secretariat of Foreign Affairs
- In office 1981–1983
- Minister: Josip Vrhovec; Lazar Mojsov
- In office 1974–1977
- Minister: Miloš Minić

Yugoslav Ambassador to Bolivia
- In office 1971–1974
- Preceded by: Iztok Žagar
- Succeeded by: Luka Belamarić

Vice-President of the Assembly of SAP Kosovo
- In office 1969–1970
- President: Ilaz Kurteshi

Personal details
- Born: 8 June 1929
- Died: 22 December 1988 (aged 59) Madrid, Spain
- Cause of death: Car accident
- Citizenship: Yugoslav
- Children: Veton and Flaka
- Education: University of Belgrade Faculty of Law
- Occupation: Diplomat
- Profession: Journalist and writer

Rexhai Surroi (Serbo-Croatian Cyrillic: Реџаји Суроји, romanized: Redžaji Suroji; 8 June 1929 – 22 December 1988) was a Yugoslav Albanian journalist, diplomat and writer.

== Biography ==
He was a member of the first cohort of students to have finished high school in Albanian in the former Yugoslavia in 1947–48. He graduated from the University of Belgrade's Law School. He was also one of the few Kosovo Albanians to become ambassadors of Yugoslavia. He was the father of Veton and Flaka Surroi.

He was an active football player for KF Prishtina before becoming journalist and editor of weekly "Zani i Rinisë". He was an editor in Radio Pristina, where he became director in the mid-sixties. In 1969–70, he served as vice-president of the provincial government of SAP Kosovo, he was one of the most fervent advocates for the establishment of the University of Pristina, the only in Yugoslavia where the medium of instruction was Albanian. In 1971, he was appointed ambassador of Yugoslavia to Bolivia and from 1974 to 1977 he held the post of assistant secretary in the Federal Secretariat of Foreign Affairs. From 1977 to 1981, he lived in Mexico City where he was the Yugoslav ambassador to Mexico, Honduras and Costa Rica, and from 1981 to 1983 again he held the post of the assistant secretary in the Federal Secretariat of Foreign Affairs. From 1983 to 1985 he was the general manager of the largest Albanian media company in Kosovo Rilindja.

He died in a car accident in December 1988 while serving as Yugoslavia’s ambassador to Spain. An award for excellence in journalism is named after him in Kosovo.

He is the author of a number of Albanian-language works such as Besniku, Dashunija dhe urrejtja, Pranvera e tretë, and Orteku I & II.

== See also ==
- Albanians in Kosovo
