= Berat Buzhala =

Kosovar journalist

Member of the Assembly of the Republic of Kosovo
- In office 2 July 2011 – 31 December 2014

Personal details
- Born: November 22, 1975 (age 50) Çabiqi, Klinë, SFR Yugoslavia (now Kosovo)
- Citizenship: Kosovo, Albania
- Other political affiliations: Democratic Party of Kosovo (2010-2013)
- Education: University of Prishtina
- Occupation: Journalist, Media Entrepreneur, Former Politician
- Profession: Journalist
- Known for: Co-founder of Gazeta Express, T7, and CEO of Nacionale
- Website: www.nacionale.com

Berat Buzhala (Albanian: [bɛˈɾat buˈʒaɫa]; born November 22, 1975) is a Kosovo-Albanian journalist and former Kosovo Member of Parliament for the former governing Democratic Party of Kosovo. He joined the political party after working as a journalist. He left politics and returned to journalism after serving a single mandate in the Parliament. Buzhala belongs to a young generation of Kosovar journalists, established after the Kosovo War. He initially worked as an economics journalist in daily Zëri and Koha Ditore, and was later one of the co-founders of daily Gazeta Express. In 2018, Buzhala helped establish a new TV channel in Kosovo named T7 which engages in independent journalism and in-depth political and economic coverage.

In 2021, Buzhala founded the digital news outlet Nacionale, based in Kosovo. The platform features contributions from journalists with prior experience in media and public affairs. It publishes original content in various formats, including articles, videos, and podcasts, and covers political, economic, and social topics relevant to Kosovo and the broader region.

Berat Buzhala was born in Çabiq, municipality of Klinë. He works and lives in Pristina.

== Controversy ==
The newspaper cofounded by Berat Buzhala, Gazeta Express, as well as the newspaper Zëri he worked for, has been labeled as a key disinformation channel in Kosovo by a European Parliament study.
