= Nacionale =

Kosovan online news portal

- Native name: Gazeta Nacionale
- Website type: News website
- Available in: Albanian
- Headquarters: Pristina, Kosovo
- Owner: Media Group Publico LLC (100% owned by Berat Buzhala)
- Founder: Berat Buzhala
- Website: nacionale.com
- Commercial: Yes
- Launched: 2 March 2022; 4 years ago
- Current status: Active

Nacionale is an Albanian-language digital online news outlet and cultural-journalistic portal based in Pristina, Kosovo. Launched in March 2022, it is operated by Media Group Publico LLC, fully owned by journalist and former politician Berat Buzhala. The platform offers original articles, videos, podcasts, and explanatory journalism; its TV content includes programs such as Ditari i Buzhalës on RTV21 and Ora e Nacionales on Kanal 10.

== Ownership and background ==
Media Group Publico LLC was established on 2 March 2022 by Berat Buzhala and Besnik Kallaba, with initial ownership of 95% and 5% respectively. By 3 June 2022, Kallaba transferred his share, making Buzhala the sole owner and director.

== See also ==
- Media of Kosovo
- Berat Buzhala
