= Prilepnica =

Përlepnicë Prilepnica
- Village
- Përlepnicë

- Location in Kosovo
- Coordinates: 42°30′46.01″N 21°31′9.01″E
- Location: Kosovo
- District: Gjilan
- Municipality: Gjilan

Population (2024)
  - Total: 1,642
- Time zone: UTC+1 (CET)

Përlepnicë (Albanian definite form: Përlepnica) or Prilepnica (Serbian Cyrillic: Прилепница), is a village in the Anamorava region of eastern Kosovo. The village is situated by the old mountainous road leading up to Novo Brdo, some 7 km from Gjilan.

== Etymology ==
The etymology of Prilepnica / Përlepnicë may come from the same origin as the etymology of Prilep a town today in North Macedonia. In the Albanian language also the word Përlep appears in both; the name Prilep means “stuck” on the rocks in Old Church Slavonic. This is in reference to an old fortress that was attached to the rocky hilltop. This can be in reference to Prilepac a Serbian medieval fortress near Novo Brdo which is by Përlepnicë.

== History ==
The village was inhabited in the Middle Ages. There are ruins of an old church. Prince Lazar of Serbia (r. 1373–1389) was born in Prilepac near Boževce, which according to tradition was Prilepnica. The village was mentioned in the Ottoman defter of 1455 of the Vlk Vilayet (Vilayet of Vuk), encompassing most of Vuk Branković's former territory. At that time the village was populated exclusively by Serbs, on the forehead with priest, living in 62 households.

The village is mentioned under the name Prilěpnica (Cyrillic: Прилѣпница).

During the Kosovo War, on 6 April 1999, Yugoslav forces entered the village and ordered the population to leave, in order to set up mines. On 13 April, they were again asked to evacuate, and the next day, houses were set on fire. A Serb was murdered on the Prilepnica road on 28 August.

Some old walls were found at the time a dam was built, but archaeologists have not yet studied the site. In old houses and during construction of new houses, items such as ancient bottles and swords are often found. Although the objects remain unidentified, some have been kept as possibly valuable.

== Notable people ==
- Mirlind Daku, (born 1 January 1998) is a professional footballer who plays as a forward for Russian Premier League club Rubin Kazan, who plays for the Albania national team.
- Leonit Abazi, (born 5 July 1993) is a Kosovar-Albanian professional footballer who plays as a left back for Football Superleague of Kosovo club Ballkani the Kosovo national team.
- Bardhyl Ajeti, (May 29, 1977 in Përlepnicë, SFR Yugoslavia – 28 June 2005 in Milan, Italy) was a reporter for the Albanian-language daily newspaper Bota Sot, published in Prishtina.
- Lazar of Serbia, (Serbian Cyrillic: Лазар Хребељановић; c. 1329 – 15 June 1389) was a medieval Serbian ruler born in this region.

== See also ==
- Përlepnicë River
- Përlepnicë Lake
- Lazar of Serbia
- Mirlind Daku
- Lutfi Haziri
- Leonit Abazi
