= Access to public information in Kosovo =

Access to public information and freedom of information (FOI) refer to the right of access to information held by public bodies also known as "right to know". Access to public information is considered of fundamental importance for the effective functioning of democratic systems, as it enhances governments' and public officials' accountability, boosting people participation and allowing their informed participation into public life. The fundamental premise of the right of access to public information is that the information held by governmental institutions is in principle public and may be concealed only on the basis of legitimate reasons which should be detailed in the law.

In the Republic of Kosovo, the Law on Access to Official Documents was enacted in 2010. The law repealed and superseded various other legislation and administrative orders that were previously in force. The right of access to public information is guaranteed by the Constitution. Several secondary acts aims at realizing the right and implement the 2010 Law. However, full implementation is lacking, the courts are slow to respond to appeals due to persistent backlogs in the judicial system. Even when the appeals process work, the institutions appear willing to ignore the rulings of the court when it comes to transparency and access to public information. Currently, in 2016, the law on access to public documents is undergoing a procedure of amendment together with other laws to which it should be harmonized.

== Legal framework ==
In Kosovo access to public information is a right guaranteed by Article 41 of the Constitution which establishes that every person is entitled of the right of access to public information and that documents held by public institutions and organs of state authorities are public, except for information that can be concealed by law for reasons due to privacy, business trade secrets or public security.

Also, the right of access to official documents is guaranteed by many international agreements and declarations, such as the Universal Declaration of Human Rights and the European Convention for the Protection of Human Rights and Fundamental Freedoms and Protocols which are directly applicable in the Republic of Kosovo and have priority in case of conflict of applicable laws.

There are also special laws regulating the application of the right of access to public information, such as the Law on Administrative procedure and the Law on Civil Service of the Republic of Kosovo.

Specifically, to implement the constitutional right of every person to have access, upon request, to documents of public interest held by public authorities, in 2010 the Assembly of the Republic of Kosovo approved the Law no. 03/L-215 on Access to Public Documents (LAPD). The LAPD Law applies to all documents maintained, drafted and received by public institutions and is based on ten principles:

- everyone has the right of access to information;
- access is the rule, secret is the exception;
- the law applies to all public bodies;
- the request should be simple, fast and free for the requester;
- officials have the duty to support the applicants in their search for information;
- the refusal should be justified;
- public interest is more important than secret;
- the right to appeal is guaranteed in case of negative reply;
- public authorities should proactively publish basic information;
- the right to information should be guaranteed by an independent body.

=== Procedures for exercising the right of access to information ===
Requesting and obtaining public information is free of charge. A fee may only be charged to applicants for copies of the document requested and have to be reasonable and aiming at only covering the actual costs of reproduction and document delivery. Exceptions to the right of access to public information can be applied and are defined by law.

According to the relevant law, access to public information may be restricted only for the purpose of protecting the public legitimate interests of life or other legitimate private interests, such as the right to privacy and for public security reasons. Other reasons for exceptions include: defence and international relations; detection and investigation of criminal activities, disciplinary investigations, atc.

The request can be made in writing or orally.

Public institutions have to respond to citizens' requests within seven days with their decision to fully or partially grant the access. The deadline for review may be exceptionally extended to 15 days.

The respect of the right of access to public information is guaranteed by the Ombudsperson Institution, an independent body supporting citizens to realize the right of access to documents that have been denied, according to the Law on Ombudsperson.

In case of rejection of the applicant's request, and non-response by the relevant authority within the deadline, the applicant can start an appeal procedure in front of the Ombudsperson Institutions or the competent courts, in accordance with applicable law.

== Access to public information in practice ==
The implementation of the laws on access to public information is problematic. According to the 2016 European Commission Progress Report, in practice the right of access to public information is “undermined by the authorities’ fragmented and unclear approach”.

Moreover, according to the Balkan Investigative Reporting Network (BIRN) the realization of the right is hindered by a secretive mentality and culture of many public authorities in the country. Also, According to the news portal Kosovo 2.0, institutions tend to disclose information on less important issues and when lower level institutions, such as municipalities, are involved. Other flaws in the application of the law consists in its misinterpretation, for instance in distinguishing between what to consider private and what a public interest, and the application of ad hoc administrative measures by certain institutions. According to Kosovo 2.0, even when the law is very clear in specifying procedures, certain institutions have created their own procedures which are not always in line with the law, resulting in barriers for interested applicants. For instance, there are numerous institutions requiring the payment of 1 euro when filling a freedom of information request, which is in contradiction with the law. Another problem concerns the officials who are responsible for receiving and processing freedom of information requests. According to Kosovo 2.0 in many cases they are not properly trained to effectively execute the law.

In Kosovo, the majority of requests for accessing public information are submitted by journalists, activists and civil society organizations, and very few by citizens that are not fully aware of their right of access to public information. According to a survey carried out in 2012, the level of knowledge about the content of the law on access to public information among citizens was extremely deficient, as well as their interest in making requests for access to public documents.

To test and monitor the implementation of the law, BIRN has submitted a series of requests for information to the majority of public institutions, at all levels, in Kosovo. From June 2013 to May 2014, it submitted a total of 125 official requests: of the requests submitted, 68 were denied, 50 approved and 7 partially denied, meaning that requested documents were received in only 40 per cent of cases. This result is considered as “rather poor” by the organisation. During the same monitoring period, one of the major problems observed by BIRN concerned access to courts information, in particular indictments. Another common problem highlighted by the organization is that, in practice and despite the law's provisions, the institution that does not have the information requested usually rejects the requests, rather than forwarding it to another institution that may have it as required by the law. According to another test, implemented between October 2013 to April 2016, only 25 per cent of BIRN's requests were approved and 38 were rejected.

== See also ==
- Access to public information in Europe
- Freedom of information
- Freedom of information laws by country
- Transparency of media ownership in Europe
- Media of Kosovo
- Transparency of media ownership in Kosovo
