= T7 (Kosovo TV channel) =

Kosovan television network

T7 Sh.p.k.
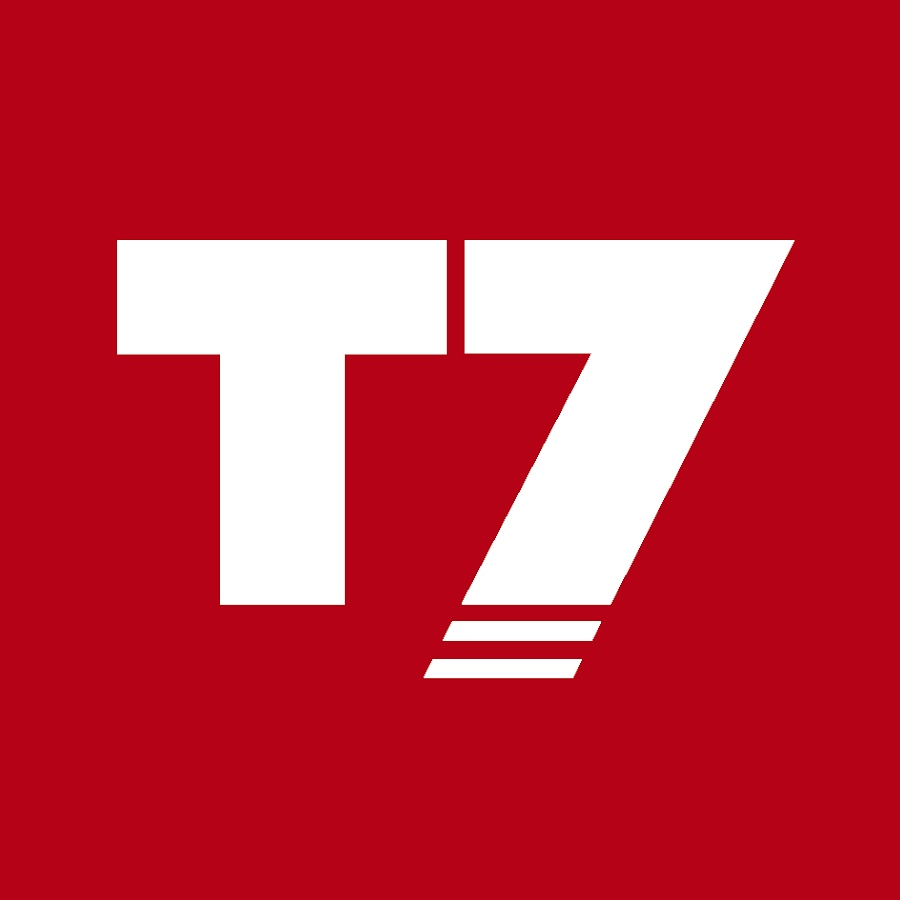
- Type: Private commercial broadcaster
- Country: Kosovo
- Broadcast area: Kosovo; Albania
- Headquarters: Pristina, Kosovo

Programming
- Language: Albanian
- Picture format: 1080i HDTV (downscaled to 16:9 576i for the SDTV feed)

Ownership
- Owner: MediaWorks Sh.p.k.
- Key people: Leonard Kerquki (director general); Arsim Lani (editor-in-chief)
- Sister channels: ABC News

History
- Launched: March 16, 2018; 8 years ago
- Founder: Berat Buzhala; Leonard Kerquki

Links
- Website: televizioni7.com

T7 (Note: Also registered as TE 7.) is a Kosovar private television channel, owned by MediaWorks Sh.p.k, It was founded by Berat Buzhala and Leonard Kerquki. T7 started broadcasting on 16 March 2018 as a sister outlet to the online publication Gazeta Express. It is best known for its debate programme Pressing.

== History ==
Gazeta Express was one of the leading newspapers in Kosovo. In 2017, the newspaper was producing programmes for other television networks such as Komiteti, Zona Express, ExpressRozë and MeShukin. Express journalists Berat Buzhala and Leonard Kerquki pitched the idea of a TV network called "ExpressTV". The name later became "T7". Express published a job posting on 3 November 2017. The channel launched on 16 March 2018 at 10:30pm. Its first programme was DPT me Fidanin presented by Fidan Jupolli. T7 co-founder Kerquki became the host of Pressing, a flagship prime-time debate programme in Kosovo.

In 2020, T7's parent company was sold to Albanian businessman Klodian Allajbeu, joining ABC News in Albania.

Co-founder Berat Buzhala left the network in 2021 in to focus on other media endeavors.

During the February 2025 Kosovan parliamentary election, Kosovo's prime minister Albin Kurti and his party Vetëvendosje chose to boycott T7 alongside Klan Kosova and RTV Dukagjini from making interviews with him. The decision was considered controverslal by T7, the other networks, and many press associations.

== Programming ==
- Lajme (3pm and 7:30pm)
- N'Fokus
- Frontal
- Mendimi për Motin
- Kendiv
- #gjesi
- Prizma
- Pressing
- 7në7
- Shneta
- Zen me Artan Behramin
- Canape
- Zanat
- Euro n'T7
- Favorit
- Majtas Jo Djathtas
- Socion
- Za me Kaltërinën
- Mirage
- Era Vere
- Fushata me Shkodran Hotin

== See also ==
- Gazeta Express, the station's online wing
- Nacionale, the news website formed by T7 co-founder Berat Buzhala after his departure from the network
