= Flaka Surroi =

Kosovar publisher

Flaka Surroi (born 1963) is a Kosovar journalist and author. She is the director general of the media company Koha Group, one of the leading media companies in Kosovo, since 2004. She comes from the family of politician and diplomat Rexhai Surroi, and is a sibling of the politician Veton Surroi (who founded the aforementioned media company).

Surroi regularly publishes op-eds in the Koha Ditore newspaper, and has published translations of English, Spanish and Serbian books.

== Life and career ==
Surroi was born in 1963 in Pristina, Kosovo. She finished her high school in Mexico, where her father was serving as an ambassador, and graduated at University of Pristina. Before the Kosovo war of 1999, Surroi has worked in several international NGOs. When her brother Veton Surroi formed the weekly magazine KOHA, she contributed as a film editor. After the war, she led the Community Development Fund from 1999 to 2004, founded by the World Bank to support Kosovo in post-war recovery. She worked for a short period of time as Secretary General of the Prime Minister of Kosovo.

After the re-entrance of her brother into politics in 2003, Surroi took the helm and sole ownership of the family enterprise Koha Group the following year. She would own 100% of the company by 2006. Koha Group consists of a national TV broadcaster called Kohavision, the biggest daily newspaper in Kosovo Koha Ditore (Daily Time), a publishing company, and other enterprises.

During her tenure as the head of Koha Ditore, the company has kept the leading position in Kosovo market.

== Advocacy ==
In 2013, she heavily supported protests against the Hashim Thaçi administration as being "thieves" and has promoted herself as an advocate of gender equality.
