= Kosova24 =

News and media website in Kosovo

- Type: Daily newspaper
- Format: Tabloid
- Owner(s): Kosova 24 SH.P.K.
- Publisher: Kosova 24 SH.P.K.
- Founded: 13 May 2020
- Language: Albanian
- Headquarters: Prizren, Kosovo
- Country: Kosovo
- Website: Official website

Kosova24 (English: Kosovo24) is an independent news media based in Kosovo. The news portal is designated for reporting events currently happening in the nation of Kosovo. The online daily news web portal Kosova24 is a medium of free sponsors. Kosova24 changed its name from (Previous: Kosova 24) to Kosova24 on 13, May 2020

== See also ==
- List of newspapers in Kosovo
