= Bardhyl Ajeti =

Kosovan reporter (1977–2005)

- Born: May 29, 1977; Përlepnica, SFR Yugoslavia (now Kosovo)
- Died: June 28, 2005 (aged 28); Milan, Italy
- Occupation: Reporter for Bota Sot

Bardhyl Ajeti^{[a]} (May 29, 1977 – June 28, 2005) was a reporter for the Albanian-language daily newspaper Bota Sot, published in Prishtina. He wrote daily editorials for the publication, and supported the anti-crime campaign of international authorities in arresting former members of the Kosova Liberation Army (KLA). Bota Sot also supported Ibrahim Rugova, a leader of the ethnic Albanian party, the Democratic League of Kosovo.

Several weeks before he was shot, Ajeti had written a complaint to the Temporary Media Commissioner, the internationally supervised media regulator in Kosovo. In his complaint he stated that his life had been threatened.

He was shot by unidentified assassins on June 3, 2005, while he was driving a car on the way to Prishtina. On June 28, 2005 he died of gunshot wounds in hospital in Milan, Italy. Police spokesman said that Bardhyl Ajeti was shot in the head at close range.

In the Country Reports on Human Rights Practices of the United States Department of State is emphasized that investigation of the killing of Bardhyl Ajeti had no developments.

Bardhyl Ajeti was not the only journalist of Bota Sot who was killed in Kosovo. Bekim Kastrati, killed on October 19, 2001 in the village Lauša near Prishtina, was also journalist of Bota Sot. The drive-by shooting of Bardhyl Ajeti was one of the apparently politically motivated killings of Kosovo Albanians during 2005. The Association of Journalists of Serbia (UNS) and Organization for Security and Co-operation in Europe condemned the attack on Ajeti, emphasizing that his case and several other attacks on journalists on Kosovo have not been solved.

== See also ==
- List of journalists killed in Europe

== Notes ==
a.	Albanian spelling: Bardhyl Ajeti, Serbo-Croat spelling: Bardil Ajeti, Бардил Ајети.
