= 21 Junior =

- Country: Kosovo
- Broadcast area: Kosovo, Albania
- Headquarters: Pristina, Kosovo

Programming
- Language(s): Albanian
- Picture format: 1080i HDTV (downscaled to 16:9 576i for the SDTV feed)

Ownership
- Owner: Company 21
- Sister channels: RTV21; 21 Plus; 21 Popullore; 21 Mix; 21 Business

History
- Launched: September 16, 2009

Links
- Website: Official Website

21 Junior is a Kosovan free-to-air television channel based in Pristina. It was launched in September 2009, by Company 21 and it's the first Kosovan TV channel dedicated to kids 24/7. A big part of its programming includes TV shows and movies by the European animation company Mondo TV. It also broadcasts children's music and musicals all made in Kosovo. Since 2015, the channel is also available in HD.

== Programming ==
=== Original programming ===
Original name	Format
21 petale	Kids program
Aventurat e mbretërisë	TV series
Hakerat	Musical
Junior Oscars	Film awards
Lajmërimi me muzikë	Morning music show
Picirrukët	Musical
Pylli i kukuvajkës	Musical
Top Hop Hiti	Song competition

=== Current programming ===
Original name	Albanian translation	Origin
Benjamin the Elephant	Elefanti Benxhamin	Germany
Christopher Columbus	Kristofor Kolombi	Italy
Dinofroz	Dinofroz	Italy
Farhat: The Prince of the Desert	Farhat	Italy
Garfield and Friends	Garfildi me miq	United States
Lauras Stern	Ylli i Laurës	Germany
Letters from Felix	Letra nga Feliksi	Italy
Lupo Alberto	Ujku Alberto	Italy
Make Way for Noddy	Hapi rrugë Nodit	United Kingdom
Pocahontas	Pokahontas	Italy
Sandokan	Sandokan	Italy
Simba Jr. to the World Cup	Simba Junior dhe kupa botërore	Italy
Simba: The King Lion	Simba: Mbreti luan	Italy
Sky Dancers	Vallëtarët e qiellit	United States
The Spaghetti Family	Shpageta familjare	Italy
The Black Corsair	Kusari i zi	Italy
The Great Book of Nature	Libri i madh i natyrës	Italy
The Last of the Mohicans	Mohikanët e fundit	Italy
The Legend of Sleeping Beauty	Bukuroshja e fjetur	Italy
The Legend of Snow White	Legjenda e Borëbardhës	Japan
The Legend of Zorro	Legjenda e Zorros	Japan
The Magician	Magjistari	France
The Nimbols	Nimbolët	Germany
The Old Testament	Testamenti i vjetër	Italy
The Story of Cinderella	Hirushja	Japan

=== Movies broadcast ===
Original name	Albanian translation	Origin
A Monkey's Tale	Historia e majmunit	France
A Series of Unfortunate Events	Një seri ngjarjesh fatkeqe	United States
Air Bud	Qeni Badi	United States
Air Bud: Golden Receiver	Qeni Badi 2	United States
Air Bud: World Pup	Qeni Badi 3	United States
Air Bud: Seventh Inning Fetch	Qeni Badi 4	United States
Air Bud: Spikes Back	Qeni Badi 5	United States
Alexander the Great	Aleksandri i Madh	Italy
Christmas in New York	Krishtlindje në Nju Jork	Italy
Felix: All Around the World	Feliksi: Anë e kënd botës	Italy
Felix: The Toy Rabbit and the Time Machine	Feliksi dhe makina e kohës	Italy
Finding Neverland	Në kërkim të Kurrkundit	United Kingdom
Happy Feet	Këmbë të lumtura	United States
Harry Potter Saga	Harry Potter Saga	United Kingdom; United States
Heidi	Haidi	United States
Hercules	Herkuli	Italy
Hua Mulan	Hua Mulan	Italy
Jack and the Beanstalk	Xheku dhe fasulja magjike	United Kingdom
King David	Mbreti David	Italy
Laura's Star	Ylli i Laurës	Germany
Little Men	Burra të vegjël	Canada
Lucky Luke: Daisy Town	Laki Luk: Qyteti Deizi	France
Lucky Luke: La Ballade des Dalton	Laki Luk dhe Daltonët	France
Pocahontas and the Spider Woman	Pokahontas dhe gruaja merimangë	Italy
Pocahontas: Princess of American Indians	Pokahontas: Princesha e indianëve	Italy
Quasimodo	Kuazimodo	Italy
Ramses	Ramses	Italy
Santa Who?	Babadimri	United States
Simba Jr. in New York	Simba Junior në Nju Jork	Italy
The Addams Family	Familja Adams	United States
The Fox and the Child	Fëmija dhe dhelpra	France
The Jungle Book	Libri i xhunglës	Italy
The Legend of the Titanic	Legjenda e Titanikut	Italy
The Magic Riddle	Enigma magjike	Australia
The Princess and the Goblin	Princesha dhe shpirti i keq	United Kingdom
The Thief of Baghdad	Hajni i Bagdadit	Italy
Turandot	Turandoti	Italy
Ulysses	Odisea	Italy
Welcome Back Pinocchio	Mirë se u ktheve Pinok	Italy

== See also ==
- Television in Kosovo
- List of radio stations in Kosovo
- RTV21
