= TeleNorba =

Albanian television channel

- Country: Albania
- Headquarters: Tirana

Programming
- Language: Albanian

Ownership
- Owner: Redi Sata

History
- Launched: 1996
- Founder: Telenorba
- Closed: 2007

Links
- Website: tnsh.tv

TeleNorba or TeleNorba Shqiptare (TNSH) was a private Albanian television channel based in Tirana. The station was launched in 1996 as an affiliate of Italian broadcaster Telenorba and became one of the earliest foreign-backed private television stations in the country, after the collapse of the communist regime. It later evolved into ABC News.

== History ==
TNSH broadcast a mixture of Albanian-language and Italian programming, including news, cartoons, telenovelas, entertainment shows and imported programs from Italy. The station grew in popularity during the late 1990s and early 2000s for airing subtitled Italian television content and Latin American soap operas.

At midnight, the station often simulcasted the Italian version of Telenorba. TNSH later became one of the few Albanian channels available via satellite throughout Europe through the DigitAlb platform.

In 2002, the channel reportedly held an audience share of approximately 11.3%, ranking among Albania’s most watched television stations at the time. TNSH also broadcast the program "Njerëz të Humbur" before the rights later moved to TV Klan.

The station underwent ownership changes over the years, passing from Italian investors to Greek and later Albanian ownership. In 2007, businessman Redi Sata acquired a majority stake in the channel and gradually transformed it into ABC News. After several years of inactivity under the TNSH name, ABC News officially began broadcasting in 2010 on the former TNSH frequency.
