= Epoka e Re =

- Type: Daily newspaper
- Publisher: Muhamet Mavraj
- Editor: Mal Qorraj
- Staff writers: Director: Sadik Zeqiri & Design: Shkembim Krasniqi
- Founded: 1999
- Political alignment: Pro-Vetëvendosje
- Headquarters: Pristina
- Website: Official website

Epoka e Re (English: The New Epoch) is a Kosovar daily newspaper published in the Albanian language in Kosovo's capital Pristina since 1999.

The founder and managing editor is Muhamet Maavraj, an activist and former leader of the University of Pristina students during the 1997 protests.

Epoka e Re is known for its critical journalistic framework, which aims to reach a new information environment and shape the Albanian and critical audience.

== See also ==
- Media of Kosovo
- List of newspapers in Kosovo
