= ArtSport =

Kosovan sports television network

- Company type: Partnership
- Industry: Telecommunications
- Founded: 2018
- Founder: ArtMotion
- Headquarters: Pristina, Kosovo
- Area served: Kosovo
- Parent: ArtMotion

ArtSport is a group of sports television channels in Kosovo, owned and operated by ArtMotion. The channels broadcast a variety of sports competitions, including the UEFA Champions League, UEFA Europa League, UEFA Europa Conference League, La Liga, Ligue 1, Coppa Italia, DFB-Pokal, Wimbledon, the NBA, judo, ONE Championship, MotoGP, Formula One, and others. All sporting events are broadcast live in Full HD. The channels are available through Artmotion, as well as on the television platforms of Kujtesa, IPKO, and TelKos.

The group includes Art Sport 1 (featuring original ArtSport programming and live matches with replays), Art Sport 2, Art Sport 3, Art Sport 4, Art Sport 5, and Art Sport 6 (primarily live match coverage with replays).

== Sports rights ==
=== Football ===
- UEFA Champions League (2021–2027)
- UEFA Europa League (2021–2027)
- UEFA Europa Conference League (2021–2027)
- La Liga (2021–2026)
- La Liga 2 (2021–2026)
- Serie A (2024–2029)
- Kosovo Superleague (2020–2024)
- Kosovo First League (2021–2024)

==== Cup competitions ====
- Kosovar Cup (2020–2024)
- Kosovar Supercup (2020–2024)

=== Basketball ===
- Kosovo Basketball Superleague (2018–2024)
- Kosovo First Basketball League (2018–2024)
- Liga Unike (2020–2024)
- NBA (2019–2024)
- Balkan League
- ABA League (2018–2023)

==== Cup competitions ====
- Kosovo Basketball Cup (2018–2024)
- Kosovo Basketball Supercup (2018–2024)
- FIBA 3x3 Europe Cup

=== Combat sports ===
- ONE Championship (2018–2021)
- World Judo Championships (2018–2022)
- Enfusion
- UFC (2023–present)

=== Motorsports ===
- MotoGP (2018–2024)
- Moto2 (2018–2024)
- Moto3 (2018–2024)
- Formula One (2018–2024)
- Formula 2 (2018–2024)
- Formula 3 (2018–2024)
- IndyCar Series (2018–2021)

=== Tennis ===
- Wimbledon (2021–2024)

=== Esports ===
- BLAST Premier
