= Leonard Kerquki =

Leonard Kerquki (born 1981) is editor-in-chief of Gazeta Express and author of Zona Express. He is a co-founder of Kosova television channel T7. Kerquki's career started in radio and then he worked for two years (2004-2006) as a journalist in the “Lajm” daily. Since 2006. Kerquki has worked for newspaper “Express” of which he was editor and editor-in-chief. He also runs www.gazetaexpress.com, a news portal in Kosovo. For two years, Kerquki has been a member of the Board of Association of Professional Journalists of Kosovo (APJK). Also, he has performed many study tours abroad. Kerquki studied journalism and he works as well as trainer of journalists in various workshops and seminars, dealing with ethics in journalism. He is also known as a political analyst and runs a political TV show.
