= Xhemail Mustafa =

Kosovo journalist and political advisor (1953–2000)

Xhemail Mustafa (August 23, 1953 – November 23, 2000) was a Kosovar journalist and prominent political advisor to Ibrahim Rugova, President of Kosovo.

== History ==
Xhemail Mustafa (Serbo-Croatian: Džemajil Mustafa) (born on August 23, 1953, in the village of Glamnik, Podujevo, FPR Yugoslavia) was a political advisor of Ibrahim Rugova (Kosovo President) and a member of the Democratic League of Kosovo (LDK). He was shot to death by two unknown gunmen in his apartment entrance stairwell in Pristina on 23 November 2000.

From 1997 to the time of his death, Mustafa was the senior media advisor to President Rugova, following a period as the spokesperson for the Democratic League of Kosovo.

Mustafa had long been an advocate of non-violent dissent. At the time of his assassination, he had recently written newspaper columns denouncing the criminal violence in Kosovo that had arisen following the 1999 cessation of hostilities in the Kosovo War.

Mustafa's assassination occurred a month after the Democratic League of Kosovo had won the largest share of votes in the municipal elections, resulting in the removal from office of members of three rival political parties formed from the Kosovo Liberation Army. Mustafa's assassination was the third such murder in two months, following the killings, by the same method, of a prominent Albanian architect and a prominent Albanian journalist.

In 2012, it was reported that authorities were close to arresting Mustafa's assassins, who were identified as a legislative member and a police officer.

== Remembrance ==
In Mustafa's honour, a primary school just steps from where he died bears his name.

On the 22nd anniversary of his assassination,the President of Kosovo Vjosa Osmani.She said:

Today marks the 22nd anniversary of the macabre murder of Xhemajl Mustafa, advisor to the historic president Dr. Ibrahim Rugova, intellectual, political activist, and spokesman for our struggle for freedom.

He was the voice of the truth during the dark days of our history, and hence, his assassination was a blow to our truth and its affirmation throughout the world.

The statement commemorated Xhemajl Mustafa and called for further investigation and accountability regarding his death.
