= Tan (weekly newspaper) =

Weekly newspaper in Kosovo (1969–1999)

- Type: Weekly newspaper
- Publisher: Tan Printing Company
- Founded: 1 May 1969
- Ceased publication: 1999
- Political alignment: Communist
- Language: Turkish
- Headquarters: Pristina
- Country: Yugoslavia; Kosovo

Tan (Turkish: Dawn) was a weekly language newspaper published between 1969 and 1999 in Pristina, Kosovo. It was one of the Turkish-language publications started in Yugoslavia.

== History and profile ==
The first issue of Tan appeared on 1 May 1969. The paper was started by the League of Communists of Kosovo. It was published by Tan Printing Company. It was first published on a biweekly basis, but later the frequency was switched to weekly. The goal of the newspaper was to transmit cultural identity of the Turkish-origin people in the region to next generations. Şükrü Zeynullah worked for the paper from 1975 to 1981 as a trade director.

Tan published several supplements and books. Some of its supplements were Çevren (Turkish for 'Your environment') which was first published in 1973 and Kuş (Turkish for 'The Bird'), a children's magazine, of which the first issue appeared in 1979. It frequently featured literary work by Turkish-origin authors. The paper ceased publication in 1999.
