= TV 21 (North Macedonia) =

Television channel in North Macedonia

- Country: North Macedonia
- Broadcast area: North Macedonia; Kosovo
- Headquarters: Skopje, North Macedonia

Programming
- Language(s): Albanian, Macedonian
- Picture format: 16:9 (576i, SDTV); 16:9 (1080i, HDTV)

Ownership
- Key people: Eugen Saraçini, Valon Saraçini
- Sister channels: RTV21

History
- Launched: 21 September 2015

Links
- Website: www.tv21.tv

Availability

Terrestrial
- Digital: Channel ?
- Boom TV: Channel ?

TV 21 is a television channel in North Macedonia. The channel was launched with an initial investment of 6.5 million euros and employs around 100 people. It is the Macedonian version of the Kosovan channel RTV21, and offers programming primarily in Albanian, with occasional content in Macedonian.

== See also ==
- Television in North Macedonia
