= Dukagjin Gorani =

Dukagjin Gorani is a journalist and media expert from Kosovo. Born in Pejë, he became one of the founders of weekly Koha in 1993, and was the first editor of Koha Ditore. He was one of the founders and first Editor-in-chief of the Gazeta Express.

== Career ==
Gorani has served as a senior advisor to the Prime Minister of Republic of Kosovo Hashim Thaçi. He is also a manager of Kosovo Institute for Journalism and Communication.

Dukagjin Gorani lives and works in Pristina.
