= Telecom of Kosovo =

Kosovar telecommunication company

- Type: Division of Post and Telecom of Kosovo
- Industry: Communications Services
- Founded: 1965
- Headquarters: Pristina, Kosovo
- Key people: Burbuqe Hana (Director)
- Products: Fixed telephony Internet; Cable TV; IPTV
- Number of employees: 3,900
- Website: https://kosovotelecom.com/en/

Telecom of Kosovo (Serbian: Телекомуникације Косова)(Albanian: Telekomi i Kosovës), trading as Vala, is a business unit of Post and Telecom of Kosovo. Telecom of Kosovo is a licensed public operator and the first choice provider of fixed network services and internet in the territory of Kosovo. At the end of 2010 Telecom of Kosovo began to provide triple-play services for its customers. With the new IPTV platform, Telecom of Kosovo together with Tring started the Cable TV & IPTV service branded TiK TV. Voice, Internet and media services in combination are provided with lower rates for about 30%.

== See also ==
- Posta e Kosovës
- Post and Telecommunication of Kosovo
- Telephone numbers in Kosovo
