= Kohavision =

Kosovan television network

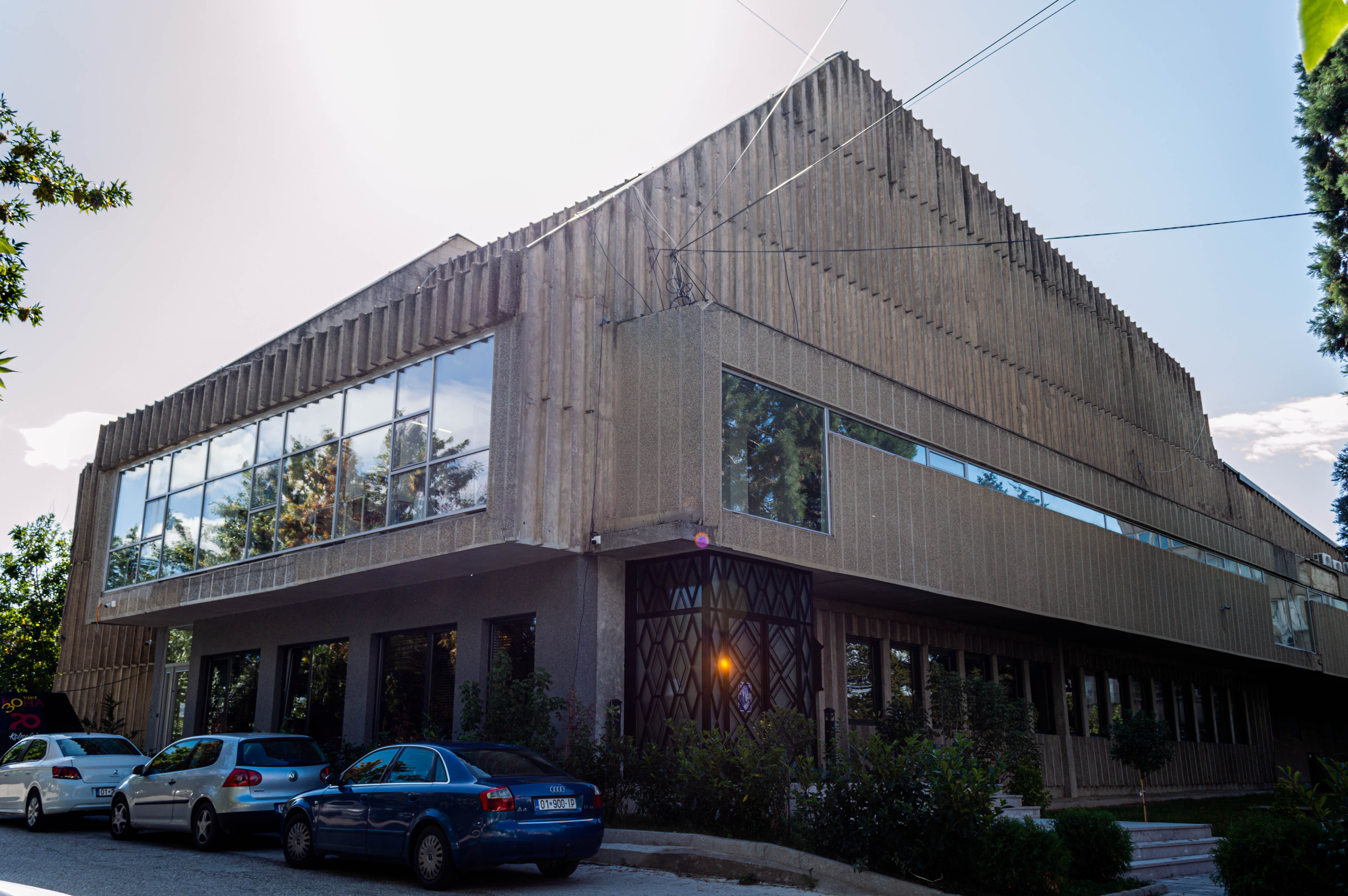
- Kohavision's headquarters in the annex of the RTK building in Pristina
- Type: Private commercial broadcaster
- Country: Kosovo
- Broadcast area: Kosovo; Albania; Montenegro; Germany; Switzerland
- Headquarters: Pristina, Kosovo

Programming
- Language: Albanian
- Picture format: 1080i HDTV (downscaled to 16:9 576i for the SDTV feed)

Ownership
- Owner: KOHA Group
- Key people: Flaka Surroi (CEO)
- Sister channels: Arta News

History
- Launched: September 21, 2000; 26 years ago
- Founder: Veton Surroi

Links
- Website: Official Website

Kohavision (shortened to KTV, previously also Koha Vision) is a Kosovan free-to-air television channel launched on September 21, 2000. It was founded by politician and journalist Veton Surroi as part of Koha Group, a media house currently led by Flaka Surroi. Its programming is centered towards news, with Koha e Lajmeve being the most watched news edition in the country. The broadcaster shares its press staff with the Koha Ditore, a daily newspaper. Kohavision also runs Arta News, a 24-hour news and documentary channel.

== History ==
Following the success of the Koha Ditore newspaper, publicist Veton Surroi launched Kohavision on September 21, 2000 as one of the first private broadcasters shortly after the Kosovo War. It received received a significant round of American support via USAID, alongside its competitor RTV21 which launched the day after.

In 2003, his sister Flaka Surroi took over as the managing director. Veton Surroi entered politics by founding the ORA Reformist Party in 2004, and thus transferred his control of KTV and the Koha Group to his sister in 2006.

== Nationally created shows broadcast by Kohavision ==
| Original name | Format |
|---|---|
| 038 | Talk show |
| Anima | Women program |
| Automan | Cars show |
| Ça ka '3? | Youth magazine |
| Cosmo | Weekly magazine |
| DokuKronika | Talk show |
| Euro | Current affairs |
| Express | Showbiz news |
| Fashionista | Fashion show |
| Fauna jonë | Animals show |
| Flladi | Summer show |
| Hajt pak | Interviews |
| Interaktiv | News show |
| Jeta | Talk show |
| Kaçurrelët | Teen TV series |
| Kënaqësia e gatimit | Cooking show |
| Konfront | Debate show |
| Kuzhina shqiptare | Cooking show |
| Nëpër film | Movies' news |
| Njerëzit dhe kujtimet flasin | Autobiography |
| Një moto për foto | Talk show |
| N'rrjet | Weekly magazine |
| Oxygen | Entertaining show |
| Përrallë me tupan | Stand-up comedy |
| PFF | Children's Sunday program |
| Pikëpresje | Current affairs |
| Prej 2 deri 12 | Sports show |
| Pro X | Interviews |
| Puls | Debate show |
| Reciklim | News show |
| Rreth botës | News edition |
| Rubikon | Debate show |
| Sot | Morning show |
| SpitaliKS | Sitcom |
| Sporti total | Sports show |
| Talent X | Talent show |
| Talk | Talk show |
| Te Linda | Cooking show |
| Top Koha Music | Music show |
| Tre gjermanët e trashë | Sitcom |
| Speciale | Dircetly TV |

== International shows broadcast by Kohavision ==
| Original name | Albanian translation | Origin |
|---|---|---|
| Servant of the People | Presidenti | Ukraine |
| Yasak Elma | Molle e Ndaluar | Turkey |
| 'Allo 'Allo! | Alo Alo! | United Kingdom |
| Amor real | Dashuri e vërtetë | Mexico |
| Asi | Asi | Turkey |
| Aşk ve Ceza | Dashuri dhe ndëshkim | Turkey |
| Aşktan Kaçılmaz | S'mund të ikësh | Turkey |
| Binbir Gece | 1001 net | Turkey |
| Bob the Builder | Bob Ndërtuesi | United Kingdom |
| Borgen | Borgen | Denmark |
| Bratz | Bratz | United States |
| Capri | Kapri | Italy |
| Cesur Ve Güzel | Trimi dhe e bukura | Turkey |
| Chaplin & Co | Çarli Çaplin | France |
| Chocolate com Pimenta | Çokollatë me piper | Brazil |
| Clase 406 | Klasa 406 | Mexico |
| Corazón Partido | Zemër e thyer | United States |
| Cuidado con el ángel | Kujdes nga engjëlli | Mexico |
| Digimon Adventure | Digimon Adventure | Japan |
| Dame Chocolate | Sekreti i ëmbël | United States |
| Dance Academy | Akademia e vallëzimit | Australia |
| Dila Hanım | Dila | Turkey |
| Everybody Hates Chris | Të gjithë e urrejnë Krisin | United States |
| Flight 29 Down | Fluturimi 29 | United States |
| Floricienta | Florisienta | Argentina |
| Footballers' Wives | Gratë e futbollistëve | United Kingdom |
| Frasier | Frasier | United States |
| Friends | Friends | United States |
| Fuego en la sangre | Gjaku i nxehtë | Mexico |
| H_{2}O: Just Add Water | H_{2}O | Australia |
| Heridas de amor | Plagë dashurie | Mexico |
| Iffet | Iffet | Turkey |
| İstanbullu Gelin | Nusja nga Stambolli | Turkey |
| Juanita, la soltera | Beqarja | Argentina |
| Kış Güneşi | Dieli Dimri | Turkey |
| Kurt Seyit ve Şura | Kurt Sejiti dhe Sura | Turkey |
| Kurtlar Vadisi | Lugina e ujqërve | Turkey |
| La fuerza del destino | Fuqia e fatit | Mexico |
| La Tormenta | Stuhia | Colombia |
| Lale Devri | Lale | Turkey |
| Las tontas no van al cielo | Budallaqet nuk shkojnë në parajsë | Mexico |
| Las Vegas | Las Vegas | United States |
| LazyTown | LazyTown | Iceland |
| Little Charley Bear | Arushi Çarli | United Kingdom |
| Medium | Medium | United States |
| Mi Pecado | Mëkati im | Mexico |
| NCIS | NCIS | United States |
| O Astro | Iluzionisti | Brazil |
| Oggy and the Cockroaches | Ogi dhe buburrecat | France |
| Ömre Bedel | Dashuro dhe vdis | Turkey |
| Only Fools and Horses | Budallenj dhe kuaj | United Kingdom |
| Out of Practice | Mjekë të pashpresë | United States |
| Pocoyo | Pokojo | Spain |
| Primera Dama | Zonja e Parë | Colombia |
| Puppy in My Pocket | Miku im këlysh | Italy |
| Rebelde Way | Rebelët | Argentina |
| Reina de corazones | Mbretëresha e zemrave | United States |
| Roman Mysteries | Misteret romake | United Kingdom |
| Rubí | Rubi | Mexico |
| Sortilegio | Joshja magjike | Mexico |
| Soy tu dueña | Je i imi | Mexico |
| The Following | Në ndjekje | United States |
| The Kennedys | Keneditë | Canada |
| Tormenta en el paraíso | Stuhi në parajsë | Mexico |
| Transporter: The Series | Transportuesi | Canada |
| Un Paso Adelante | Një hap përpara | Spain |
| Una Maid en Manhattan | Ndihmëse në Manhattan | United States |
| Uttaran | Uttaran | India |
| Will & Grace | Uill dhe Grejs | United States |
| Yo soy Betty, la fea | Beti e shëmtuar | Colombia |
| Yoho Ahoy | Yoho Ahoy | United Kingdom |

== See also ==
- Television in Kosovo
- List of radio stations in Kosovo
- Radio Television of Kosovo
- RTV21
