= Kosova Press =

KosovaPress
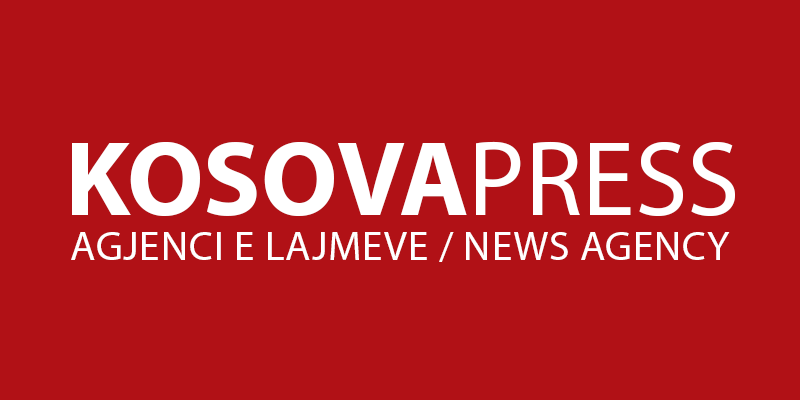
- Type: Daily online
- Format: Online
- Staff writers: Approximately 60 journalists
- Founded: 1999
- Language: Albanian, English
- Headquarters: Pristina, Kosovo
- Website: www.kosovapress.com

Kosova Press is a news agency headquartered in Pristina, Kosovo, established on 4 January 1999. Since that time, it has published information in Albanian, English, German, and French. It currently publishes in Albanian and English.

During the provisional stage under the international protectorate, and due to the political status of Kosovo, Kosova Press transformed into an independent news agency in September 2000. It is a member of the South East Europe Media Organisation, the Association of Balkan News Agencies (ABNA), and the Association of Private News Agencies.
