= Petrit Selimi =

Kosovar Albanian politician

Minister of Foreign Affairs Acting
- In office 7 April 2016 – 5 June 2016
- Preceded by: Hashim Thaci
- Succeeded by: Enver Hoxhaj

Personal details
- Born: 1 May 1979 (age 47) Pristina, SR Serbia, SFR Yugoslavia
- Party: Democratic Party of Kosovo
- Spouse: Arlinda Selimi
- Children: Rrok Trim Selimi
- Education: BA in Social Anthropology from University of Oslo; Master of Science in Media and Communication from London School of Economics (Ongoing).
- Website: Petrit Selimi, Millennium Foundation Kosovo

Petrit Selimi (born 1 May 1979 in Pristina, Kosovo) is a former Kosovar Albanian politician, who has served as a Minister of Foreign Affairs of the Republic of Kosovo. He's now a private entrepreneur and an author. He initially served in the position of a Deputy Foreign Minister during two consecutive mandates, under Prime Ministers Hashim Thaci (2011–2014) and Isa Mustafa (2014-2017). After the election of the former Foreign Minister Hashim Thaci as a President of Kosovo, Selimi was named the country's Foreign Minister.

Selimi has also served as the chief executive officer of the Millennium Foundation Kosovo, (2017-2023) Kosovo's biggest foundation, responsible for implementing the programs financed by the US federal agency Millennium Challenge Corporation. He is also a Fellow at German Marshall Fund of United States and a recipient of the Chevening Scholarship of Foreign, Commonwealth & Development Office (FCO).

In his previous job as country's Foreign Minister and Deputy Foreign Minister Selimi has initiated several noted diplomatic initiatives including Kosovo's award-winning Digital Diplomacy program as well as Interfaith Kosovo initiative. Wired Magazine called Selimi "a pioneer in digital diplomacy." He was also selected as the "team-leader of the year 2013 in digital diplomacy" in the global survey by Turkish magazine Yeni Diplomasi. In recent press coverage in Huffington Post, Selimi was also noted as a prominent promoter of global interfaith dialogue.

== Career ==
As a children's rights activist in his teens, Selimi in 1995 co-founded "Postpessimists", the first network of youth NGOs in the former Yugoslavia. The organization later won Global Youth Peace and Tolerance Award.

After finishing studies in Norway, Selimi returned to participate in various civic initiatives, serving as a member of the board of directors of Soros Foundation in Kosovo. He later helped found Balkan Children and Youth Foundation, serving for two terms as a member of the board of directors, alongside President Martti Ahtisaari, CNN Chief International Correspondent Christiane Amanpour and others.

Selimi was also one of the founders of the daily newspaper Express, serving as the first publishing director of this daily newspaper. In 2004 he co-founded Stripdepot, comics bookshop/cafe, situated in downtown Pristina.

Selimi worked as private public relations consultant in Kosovo, until June 2011, when he got appointed by the prime minister of Kosovo Hashim Thaçi as a deputy minister of foreign affairs of Kosovo. Selimi was also the initiator of the installation of the memorial stone dedicated to Kosovar Jews who perished in the Holocaust, erected by the gates of the Kosovo Parliament.

== Personal life ==
Petrit Selimi is married with Arlinda Selimi since 2010. They have a son Rrok Trim Selimi. They live and work in Pristina.

== Awards ==
In 2019, Petrit Selimi has received the prestigious Marshall Memorial Fellowship 2019, provided by the German Marshall Fund. The Marshall Memorial Fellowship (MMF) is GMF's flagship leadership development program and previous alumni include President Emmanuel Macron of France and EU’s former Foreign Policy chief Federica Mogherini.

In 2016, Selimi was awarded the prestigious global Doha Award for Interfaith Dialogue, in a ceremony organized by the Doha International Center for Interfaith Dialogue. The Award was granted to Selimi by the Qatar Minister of Justice.

In 2014 Selimi was honored as Knight Commander of Royal order of Francis I, bestowed to him by Vatican's nuncio to the United Nations Cardinal Martino of Sacred Military Constantinian Order of Saint George, for Selimi's role in promoting interfaith dialogue and tolerance.

In 2008 Selimi won a Chevening Scholarship from the British Council enabling him to undertake studies at London School of Economics.
