= Veton Surroi =

Kosovar journalist, politician and founder of the ORA political party

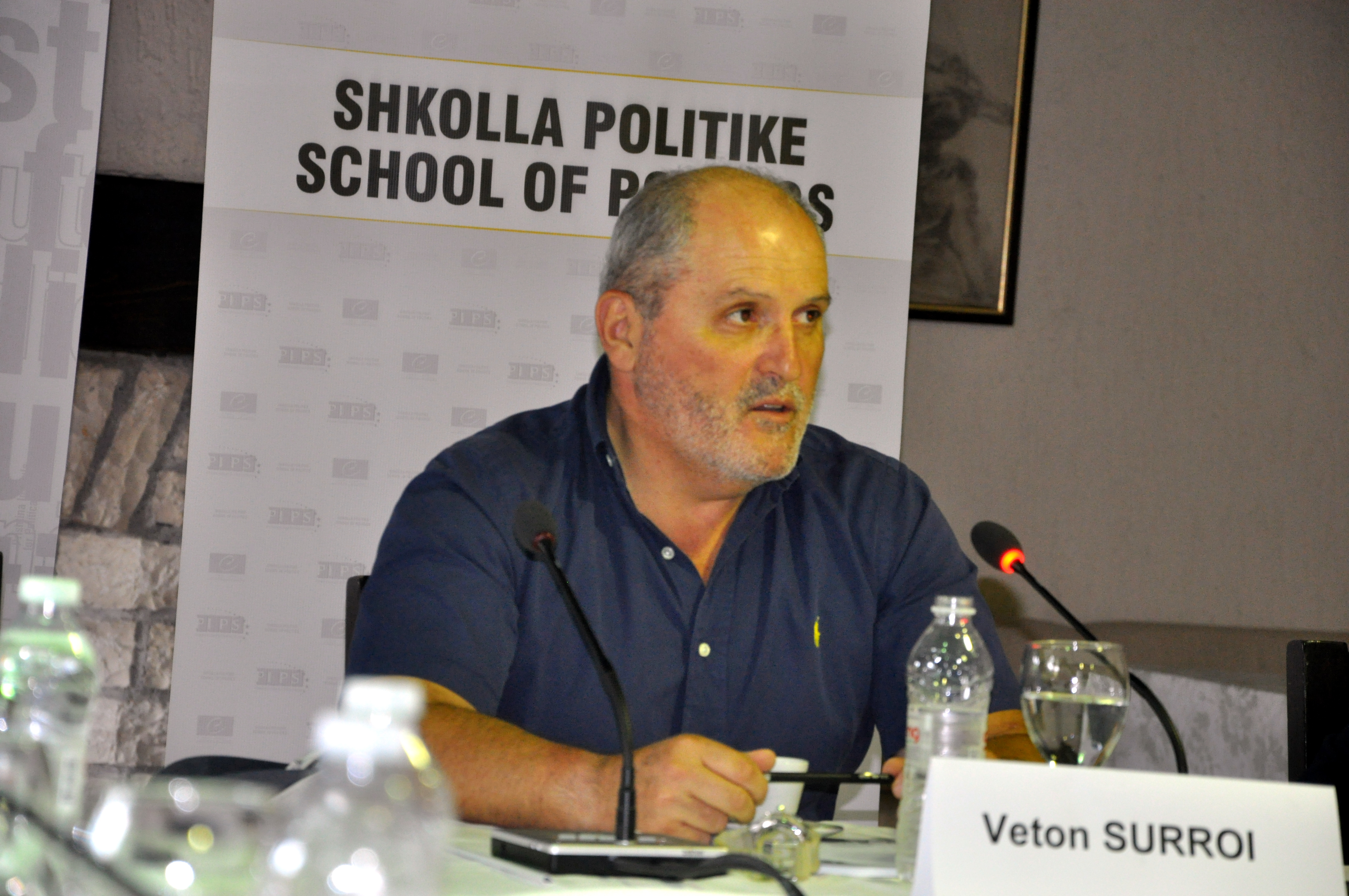
- Veton Surroi in 2015.
- Born: 17 July 1961 (age 65); Kosovo, FPR Yugoslavia
- Citizenship: Kosovo

Veton Surroi (born 17 July 1961) is a Kosovar-Albanian publicist, politician and former journalist. Surroi is the founder and former leader of the ORA political party, and was a member of Kosovo assembly from 2004 to 2008.

== Career ==
Veton Surroi studied Modern English Language and Literature at the National Autonomous University of Mexico (UNAM). He worked as a journalist in the Albanian language daily Rilindja. In 1989, he was one the founders of the Association for the Yugoslav Democratic Initiative and the first independent trade unions in Kosovo. In 1990, he founded and became editor-in-chief of the independent Koha weekly. From 1991-92, he was president of the Parliamentary Party of Kosovo.

In 1997, Surroi established one of the biggest Kosovo Albanian daily newspapers Koha Ditore and was the editor-in-chief for a number of years before he entered politics in Kosovo.

Surroi won the 2011 SEEMO Human Rights Award.

== Personal life ==
Surroi's father, Rexhai Surroi, was one of the very few Albanians to become ambassadors of the former Yugoslavia. His father was the Yugoslav ambassador to Spain and a number of Latin American countries. As a result, Surroi spent a part of his life in the Spanish-speaking world where he was also educated.

Surroi is a polyglot, speaking four languages, namely Albanian, English, Serbian and Spanish.
