= Kosova Sot =

Newspaper published in Kosovo

- Type: Daily newspaper
- Founded: 1998
- Political alignment: Pro-Democratic Party of Kosovo
- Headquarters: Pristina
- Website: Official website

Kosova Sot (English: Kosovo Today) is a newspaper published in Kosovo. The Netherlands supported the independent media in the country and the first edition was published on 12 September 1998.

The founder of Kosova Sot is Ruzhdi Kadriu. Editor-in-chief and director until 2014 was Margarita Kadriu.

Kosova Sot is published in hard copy as well as online.
