= Bota Sot =

Newspaper from Kosovo

- Type: Daily newspaper
- Format: Tabloid
- Owner: Media Print
- Publisher: Mazrekaj Media
- Editor: Idriz Morina
- Staff writers: 45
- Founded: 1995
- Political alignment: Democratic League of Kosovo; Democratic Party of Albania
- Headquarters: Zürich, Pristina
- Country: Kosovo
- Circulation: 13,000 (daily)
- Website: www.botasot.info

Bota Sot (English: World Today) is a daily newspaper in Kosovo, originally published by members of the Kosovo diaspora in Switzerland.

== History ==
Bota Sot is published by Media Print and is owned by Xhevdet Mazrekaj, a diaspora businessman. The newspaper was published for the first time in 1995, and initially solely published abroad. The paper editorially supports the Democratic League of Kosovo and the Democratic Party of Albania and has supported two previous presidents of Kosovo and Albania, Ibrahim Rugova and Sali Berisha.

A number of the newspaper's journalists have been assassinated. Xhemail Mustafa, a journalist and advisor to President Rugova, was assassinated in November 2000. Bota Sot journalist Bekim Kastrati was assassinated in October 2001, along with two other men who were in his car at the time, in the village of Lauša, near Pristina. Bardhyl Ajeti wrote daily editorials for Bota Sot, supporting the anticrime campaign of international authorities in arresting former members of the Kosovo Liberation Army. He was shot by unidentified assassins in June 2005.
