= Rilindja (newspaper) =

Kosovo Albanian newspaper and book publisher

Rilindja's logo.

Rilindja (English: Renaissance) was a Kosovo Albanian newspaper and book publisher. It was the first newspaper in Albanian in Yugoslavia.

== History ==
Rilindja first came out on 12 February 1945, in Prizren, as the first newspaper in Albanian in Yugoslavia. It was initially printed at the State Printing Shop in Prizren for issues 1 to 60. From issue 61 onward, it was printed in Pristina's Regional Printing House of the People's Front of Yugoslavia.

In the beginning, it was published weekly until 27 June 1948. After that, it began to come out twice a week, on Sundays and Thursdays. Then, from November 1958, it continued as a daily paper (except Fridays). By the year 1964, it appears every day. On 5 September 1990, the Serbian government banned its publication. With the entry of NATO forces, on 12 June 1999, it appeared again.

It was one of the best sold newspapers in the Albanian sphere. Its maximum circulation reached up to 234,000 copies during the New Year holidays.

In 2002, the premises were blocked by UNMIK administration and listed as a property of Kosovo Agency of Privatization, shutting it down abruptly.
