= Gazeta Express =

Kosovar newspaper

- Cover of Gazeta Express, year 2006
- Type: Daily newspaper
- Format: Tabloid
- Owner: MediaWorks
- Publisher: MediaWorks
- Staff writers: Leonard Kerquki (CEO)
- Founded: 2005
- Language: Multilingual
- Headquarters: Pristina
- Website: www.gazetaexpress.com

Gazeta Express is a newsportal owned by MediaWorks in Kosovo.

== History ==
A new media company founded in 2005 by a group of senior editors and journalists with financing from IPKO, Kosovo's leading private telecommunications company. Initial group of founders include: Berat Buzhala, Petrit Selimi, Dukagjin Gorani, Ilir Mirena, Astrit Gashi, Arlinda Desku, Andrew Testa, Gjergj Filipaj, Bul Salihu, etc. First Editor-in-chief was Dukagjin Gorani (2005), followed by Berat Buzhala (2007). Company's first CEO was Petrit Selimi (2005), and was later followed by Baton Haxhiu (2007) and Shpend Jakupi (2010-2013). Current CEO is Leonard Kërquki.

== See also ==
- List of newspapers in Kosovo
