= Koha Ditore =

Daily news publication in Kosovo

- Koha Ditore of 11 April 2010
- Type: Daily newspaper
- Format: Berliner
- Owner: Koha Group
- Publisher: Flaka Surroi
- Staff writers: 37
- Founded: 31 March 1997; 29 years ago
- Ceased publication: 16 March 2020; 6 years ago (print; switched to online only)
- Headquarters: Pristina
- Country: Kosovo
- Circulation: 10,665 daily
- Website: koha.net/koha-ditore

Koha Ditore ('Daily Time') is a daily news publication in Kosovo, and its newspaper of record. It is the leading daily newspaper in the country. It was the first Albanian-language newspaper during the country's Yugoslav occupation (SAP Kosovo), founded on 31 March 1997 by the publicist Veton Surroi.

Veton Surroi left the newspaper after his entry into politics in 2004, and handed over control to his sister Flaka Surroi. Due to the impact of the COVID-19 pandemic in Kosovo, Koha Ditore ended its print edition on 16 March 2020 and switched to a digital-only publication via the website Koha.net. Koha Ditore is a sister of the television network Kohavision, and its 24-hour news channel Arta News.

The newspaper initially published as the weekly magazine Koha, which ran from 1992 to 1994. Its initial team fostered a generation of opinion-makers such as Ylber Hysa, Baton Haxhiu, Dukagjin Gorani, Eqrem Basha, Kelmend Hapçiu, and Shkelzen Maliqi.

== Editorial independence ==
The newspaper is generally considered independent, however issues of conflict of interest were raised when the founder of the newspaper Veton Surroi entered local politics in Kosovo.

In 2012, US Ambassador to Kosovo, Christopher Dell, accused the newspaper of promoting the political aspirations of Veton Surroi. Dell referred to events in early 2011 when Kosovo did not have any president and Surroi, a long-time friend of the ambassador, was in talks with Kosovo's Prime Minister, Hashim Thaci, and Dell to be proposed as Kosovo's new president. According to Dell, during these time the newspaper that usually has been a fierce critic of the Thaçi government, quit criticizing the government. When the plans changed and Behgjet Pacolli was elected president, the newspaper launched a series of articles against both the ambassador and Pacolli. Among other things Koha Ditore published pictures of SMS messages taken during the parliamentary session when the president was elected showing that Dell was influencing the election of the president. Dell claimed media was violating his privacy while Koha Ditore claimed the ambassador wanted to censor them and limit freedom of speech. Surroi has confirmed he was positive when asked if he wanted to be president but has accused Dell of exaggerating and spreading rumours when describing the events. Koha Ditore has answered that the newspaper is not edited by Veton Surroi but by his sister Flaka Surroi, and that the newspaper was doing its job when they published the SMS messages.

== See also ==
- List of newspapers in Kosovo
- Kohavision, a television network and Koha Ditore's sister subsidiary
