= RTV21 =

Radiotelevizioni 21
- Type: National; Private; Generalist channel
- Country: Kosovo
- Broadcast area: Kosovo; Albania; North Macedonia; United States

Programming
- Language: Albanian
- Picture format: PAL; HDTV 1080i

Ownership
- Owner: 21 Media
- Sister channels: TV21 (North Macedonia); 21 Plus; 21 Popullore; 21 Mix; 21 Junior; 21 Business

History
- Launched: May 11, 1998 (radio); September 22, 2000 (television)

Links
- Website: rtv21.tv

Radiotelevision 21 (Albanian: Radiotelevizioni 21), abbreviated as RTV21, is a broadcaster and media company based in Pristina, Kosovo, which includes a radio (est. May 11, 1998), a television station (est. September 22, 2000), and six sister stations. Its launch in online radio made it the first Albanian station to air over the internet.

== History ==
=== Founding ===
Founded as Radio 21 by Afërdita Saraçini and her husband, Florin Kelmendi, this transmission was a 30-minute news program about the events in Kosovo during the 1998-1999 war. Radio 21 reported from Skopje temporarily during the NATO bombing (March–June 1999). After the war began the revival of this broadcaster and with the help of donations from abroad the company also launched the national TV channel RTV21. In 2000 the station was licensed nationally and broadcast two hours of programming daily, which was increased to 18 hours in 2001. Since 2002, the transmitter airs a round-the-clock programming, consisting of 70% in-house productions.

RTV21 broadcasts via terrestrial and satellite in Europe and America. Even Radio 21 broadcasts 24 hours through FM waves.

=== Further endeavors ===
Since September 2007, RTV21 launched multiple cable channels: the music channel 21 Plus, the Albanian folk music station 21 Popullore, the children's channel 21 Junior, the cultural channel 21 Mix, and the economy channel 21 Business. This would be followed up by the foundation of TV 21 in North Macedonia on September 21, 2015.

Company 21 owns a 2200-square meter venue named Sheshi 21 (Square 21), which is rented to event organizers.

=== Major firsts in Kosovo programming ===
Being one of the major three television stations in Kosovo at the time, it and Kohavision were competing with their arrivals of foreign shows to the country. The network aired Latin American telenovelas as a part of its regular schedule, however in 2009 this programming slowly shifted to the Turkish drama series which was already growing in popularity worldwide. Acı Hayat (Bitter Life) first aired on the network that year, to major success in the Kosovan market as it brought stiff competition to the competing networks. Kohavision soon followed suit, along with other networks using the same strategy and steadily replacing Latin American telenovelas.

In January 2012, RTV21 became the first station in Kosovo to broadcast on digital terrestrial. 2013 marked RTV21's efforts in anamorphic widescreen, later broadcasting in high-definition, the first station in Kosovo and in the Balkans to do so. By the end of 2012, RTV21 was selected as TV channel of the year on the first edition of IMK.

Besides various newscasts, RTV21 broadcasts primarily cultural and entertainment programs such as Diçka po zihet or magazine program Relax. Also the first season of Shpija e Kosovës (the early Kosovan version of Big Brother) was broadcast on RTV21.

== See also ==
- Television in Kosovo
- List of radio stations in Kosovo
- Radio Television of Kosovo
- Kohavision
- 21 Junior
