= El Independiente (Colombian newspaper) =

Newspaper in Colombia

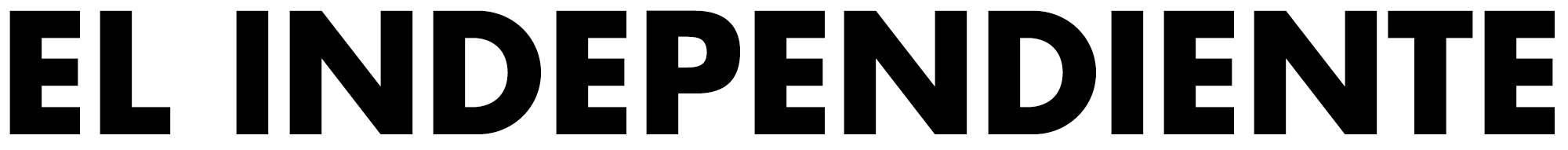

- Extra edition of "El Independiente", when Gustavo Rojas Pinilla resigned the Presidency of Colombia; May 10, 1957
- Type: Daily newspaper
- Format: Broadsheet
- Founder: Gabriel Cano Villegas
- Publisher: El Espectador
- Editor-in-chief: Alberto Lleras Camargo (February–April 1956); Guillermo Cano Isaza (February 1957 – May 1958)
- Founded: February 20, 1956
- Ceased publication: May 31, 1958
- Political alignment: Liberalism
- Language: Spanish
- Headquarters: Bogotá, Colombia

El Independiente (English: The Independent) was a Colombian newspaper that replaced El Espectador, when this newspaper suspended its publication due to a series of illegal actions committed against it by the military regime of Gustavo Rojas Pinilla in 1956.

== Historical context ==
On November 9, 1949, President Mariano Ospina Pérez established a state of siege, closed down the Congress and instituted press censorship, which remained in force during the next three administrations. This last action caused the resignation of the director of El Espectador, Luis Cano Villegas, who was substituted by his brother Gabriel Cano. Rojas Pinilla got the Presidency by a coup d'état, and the Colombian mass media situation got worse. In August 1953, El Siglo and El Colombiano were closed down, and in August 1955, the government ordered the closure of El Tiempo.

== Closing of El Espectador ==
Unlike the above-mentioned newspapers, El Espectador was not closed down by the dictatorship, but it was permanent target of a strong harassment by the government. On May 11, 1954, Primo Guerrero, a correspondent to the newspaper in Quibdó, was put in jail for having written a report in which he complained on the precarious conditions of the capital of Chocó in comparison with the luxury of the cars that had been assigned to official employees in that city. On December 20, 1955, the ODIPE (Acronym for Office of Information and Press), led by Jorge Luis Arango, fined El Espectador and El Correo (from Medellín) with 10,000 Colombian pesos, accusing both newspapers of having given news on violence, which was strictly prohibited. Gabriel Cano paid the fine without any appeal, but the next day he published an editorial column entitled "The Treasure of the Pirate", without showing it first to the government censors to be approved. He criticized the regime directly, comparing it with a group of pirates, and ironically hinting that Rojas was the leader of that gang of thieves:

"The main submarine of Mr. Arango has already gotten a small victory against us, and tomorrow will surely come other one from the Mr. Villaveces' Coast Guard, which since last August, in disgusting coincidence with the closure of El Tiempo, docked in the offices of that distinguished daily and ours, supposedly hunting unknown monstrous frauds to the national treasury [...] They have dived deep into our accounting books and in our archives, and they are still there with their jaws open like lurking sharks. What we do not know yet is the precise amount of the booty that they will give to Mr. Morgan... Mr. Morgan, the banker".

On January 6, 1956, the government, by Resolution 7130 of the Dirección Nacional de Impuestos (the Colombian National Tax Office), fined El Espectador with 600,000 Colombian pesos for an alleged inaccuracy in the tax return made by the company in 1953. Gabriel Cano wanted to make public his position on the situation in a new editorial column titled "Treasure Island", but this time he was forced to show it first to the official censors and they rejected it. In that prohibited text there was a detailed summary of the persecutions suffered by the newspaper in previous governments and the economic difficulties that they were having after being set on fire in September 1952. The last paragraph pointed out that:

"Nevertheless, it is a little sarcastic that we now appear like the unpaid and non payable victims of September 6, like the punishable fraudsters of the Treasury, while others, government or people -two entities that in the long and dark days of this state of siege are mixed in punishable and harmful concubinage- have been able to diminish with impunity the historical wealth of the Republic, which is much more valuable and more sacred than its simple tax wealth".

As not being allowed to publish the column with which he tried to defend his newspaper in front of national opinion, Gabriel Cano decided to close El Espectador for an indefinite time.

== Creation of El Independiente ==
As well as Eduardo Santos did when he founded Intermedio to replace El Tiempo, Gabriel Cano thought that he could not leave his employees without a job, whereas the newspaper's machinery just caused losses by being out of business. Through some acquaintances and friends, he tried several times to get required authorizations to print a new publication under another title. The names of La Idea, La Consigna and La Correspondencia were rejected, among other reasons, because they were the same titles that Fidel Cano Gutiérrez had chosen to keep printing newspapers in the end of the 19th century and the beginning of the 20th century whenever the governments of the so-called "Regeneration" and the Colombian Conservative Party hegemony frequently closed down El Espectador.

First edition of "El Independiente", February 20, 1956

Finally, Darío Bautista and José Salgar obtained the authorization to print El Independiente. The first edition circulated on February 20, 1956, directed by Alberto Lleras Camargo. However, since Lleras was simultaneously the leader of Liberal Party, many of the actions against the regime were planned from the offices of El Independiente, and some handbill regarded as subversive by the government was linked to the activity of the newspaper. Lleras was accused of being an accomplice of such clandestine maneuvers. He was not allowed to defend himself, and the new daily was closed on April 15, 1956, less than two months after being founded.

In October 1956, during the General Assembly of the Inter American Press Association held in Havana, Cuba, several journalists and continental political celebrities suggested Gabriel Cano to restart the publication of El Espectador. Back in Colombia, Alberto Lleras Camargo and Alfonso López Michelsen also asked Cano to do it. But he refused to accept these suggestions, saying that his daily would not reappear until when his defense editorial column could be published "without the most minimum cut, although it was within a month, within a year, or within a century". Anyway, he gave the chance of printing El Independiente or any other newspaper that was in accordance with the ideals of El Espectador.

El Independiente resumed its issuing on February 2, 1957, directed by Guillermo Cano Isaza (son of Gabriel Cano). One month later, on March 4, the Administrative Court of Cundinamarca derogated the fine imposed on El Espectador and ordered the refund of the paid money. The lawsuit that succeeded was set up by Carlos Lleras Restrepo, lawyer of the company. The censorship kept merciless. According to Guillermo Cano, there were two completely different newspapers every day: "The one that was read the three or four censors, and another which was printed and that was in the hands of thousands of people. The first one was good, complete and informative. The second one was elaborated in a hurry, very varied and amusing, with many curiosities and little information, with many beauty queens in swimsuit, but no current opinions".

== Return of democracy and reopening of El Espectador ==
Since May 5, 1957, the country was in a national strike. The opposition newspapers, banks, factories, stores, schools, clubs, cinemas and theaters ceased their activities. Rojas Pinilla resigned on May 10 and left the government in charge of a Military Junta. In the extra edition that El Independiente issued that day, the editorial column announced its full support to the agreement signed between Alberto Lleras Camargo and Laureano Gómez that helped to end the dictatorship, and that resulted in the return of democracy through a mechanism of alternation in Presidency and equal distribution of the public offices between liberals and conservatives. This agreement was known as the National Front.

"There is only one thing we can and we want to say, and it is that we are willing to give our modest but patriotic contribution to any resolutions that, now or later, be taken by the directives of the Liberal and Conservative parties, whose historic agreement signed in March we supported timely, loyally and decidedly".

However, in the same extra edition, it was made clear that El Espectador would only return when democratic institutions were fully and definitively restored. And this lasted a long time to be fulfilled. The plebiscite that ratified the validity of the pact between Liberals and Conservatives took place on December 1, 1957. The Congress elections were on March 16, 1958. And the presidential elections were held on May 4, 1958.

With democracy fully restored, El Independiente published its final number on May 31, 1958. The next day, June 1, El Espectador circulated again, with a morning edition directed by Gabriel Cano and other one in the afternoon, led by Guillermo Cano.
