= La casa de los famosos Colombia season 1 =

Reality show season

La casa de los famosos Colombia
- Season 1
- Hosted by: Cristina Hurtado; Carla Giraldo
- No. of days: 128
- No. of houseguests: 27
- Winner: Karen Sevillano
- Runner-up: Julián Trujillo
- No. of episodes: 128

Release
- Original network: Canal RCN
- Original release: 11 February – 17 June 2024

Season chronology
- Next → Season 2

The first season of the Colombian reality television series La casa de los famosos Colombia premiered on 11 February 2024, with a live move-in on Canal RCN. The show follows a group of celebrities living in a house together while being constantly filmed with no communication with the outside world as they compete to be the last competitor remaining to win the cash grand prize. The season is hosted by Cristina Hurtado and Carla Giraldo.

The season concluded on 17 June 2024, after 128 days of competition with Karen Sevillano being crowned the winner, and Julián Trujillo the runner-up.

== Housemates ==
On 9 January 2024, actress Martha Isabel Bolaños was the first confirmed housemate. Later, figures such as the actress and singer Diana Ángel, the actors Sebástian Gutiérrez and Julián Trujillo, and the influencers Natalia Segura and Ornella Sierra were named.

| Name | Age | Hometown | Occupation | Day entered | Day exited | Status | Ref. |
|---|---|---|---|---|---|---|---|
| Karen Sevillano | 28 | Cali, Colombia | Influencer | 1 | 128 | Winner | |
| Julián Trujillo | 37 | Bogotá, Colombia | Actor | 1 | 128 | Runner-up | |
| Miguel Melfi | 27 | Panama City, Panama | Singer | 1 | 128 | 3rd Place | |
| Sebastián González | 34 | Cali, Colombia | Actor | 56 | 128 | 4th Place | |
| Eduardo Ferrer | 25 | Cartagena, Colombia | Influencer | 1 | 127 | Evicted | |
| Kevin Fuentes | 33 | Riohacha, Colombia | Model, athlete and reality star | 1 | 120 | Evicted | |
| Martha Isabel Bolaños | 50 | Cali, Colombia | Actress and reality star | 1 | 113 | Evicted | |
| Ornella Sierra | 23 | Barranquilla, Colombia | Influencer | 1 | 106 | Evicted | |
| Natalia Segura | 31 | Cali, Colombia | Influencer | 1 | 99 | Evicted | |
| Diana Ángel | 48 | Bogotá, Colombia | Actress and singer | 1 | 92 | Evicted | |
| Juan Camilo Pulgarín | 28 | Medellín, Colombia | Influencer | 53 | 88 | Evicted | |
| Mafe Walker | 47 | Bogotá, Colombia | Influencer | 1 | 85 | Evicted | |
| Isabella Santiago | 31 | Caracas, Venezuela | Actress and beauty queen | 1 | 84 | Expelled | |
| Miguel Bueno | 22 | Medellín, Colombia | Singer-songwriter | 54 | 78 | Evicted | |
| Omar Murillo | 42 | Cali, Colombia | Actor and comedian | 1 | 71 | Evicted | |
| Tania Valencia | 34 | Cali, Colombia | Model and former beauty queen | 56 | 64 | Evicted | |
| Juan David Zapata | 27 | Medellín, Colombia | Athlete | 1 | 57 | Evicted | |
| Sandra Muñoz | 45 | Manizales, Colombia | Actress and reality star | 1 | 57 | Evicted | |
| Nanis Ochoa | 34 | Medellín, Colombia | Actress | 55 | 56 | Expelled | |
| Camilo Díaz | 26 | Bogotá, Colombia | Comedian | 1 | 50 | Evicted | |
| Nataly Umaña | 38 | Ibagué, Colombia | Actress | 1 | 43 | Evicted | |
| Sebastián Gutiérrez | 25 | San Salvador, El Salvador | Actor | 1 | 43 | Walked | |
| José Rodríguez Medina | 34 | Bogotá, Colombia | Singer, actor and dancer | 1 | 36 | Evicted | |
| Isabella Sierra | 18 | Neiva, Colombia | Actress, singer and dancer | 1 | 29 | Evicted | |
| Beto Arango | 58 | Bogotá, Colombia | Actor | 1 | 22 | Evicted | |
| Johana Velandia | 39 | Villavicencio, Colombia | Comedian | 1 | 15 | Evicted | |
| Naren Daryanani | 52 | Bogotá, Colombia | Actor | 1 | 8 | Evicted | |

== Nomination table ==
| Housemates | Week 1 | Week 2 | Week 3 | Week 4 | Week 5 | Week 6 | Week 7 | Week 8 | Week 9 | Week 10 | Week 11 | Week 12 | Week 13 | | Week 14 | Week 15 | Week 16 | Week 17 | Week 18 | Final | |
|---|---|---|---|---|---|---|---|---|---|---|---|---|---|---|---|---|---|---|---|---|---|
| Head of Household(s) | Karen; Miguel M. | Nataly | ~~Miguel M.~~ | Isabella S. | Julián | Camilo D. | Isabella S. | Omar | Kevin | Miguel M. | Alfredo | ~~Kevin~~ Alfredo | Miguel M. | Julián | S. González | Kevin | Miguel M. | none | | | |
| Nominated by the Leader(s) | Julián; Naren | ~~Camilo D.~~ | Julián | S. Gutiérrez | Miguel M. Nataly | ~~Omar~~, Miguel M. | Alfredo; Omar | Natalia; Karen | Omar | Mafe | Isabella S. | ~~Mafe~~; S. González | S. González | Kevin | Karen | Miguel M. | none | | | | |
| Housemates Nominees | Martha; Ornella | Martha; Sandra; Diana; S. Gutiérrez; Omar | Beto | Martha | Mafe; José | Julián; Juan D. | Mafe | Isabella S. Miguel M. | Julián | S. González | none | Martha; Isabella S. | Diana; Julián | S. González; Alfredo | Julián; Miguel M. | Julián; S. González | none | | | | |
| Nominated by the Public | Beto; Julián | José | Kevin; Juan D. | Diana; Isabella I. | Juan D. Ornella | Kevin | Juan D. Sandra | Juan D. Sandra | Camilo D. | Omar | none | Diana; Alfredo | Juan C. Natalia | Diana; Karen; Ornella | Kevin | Alfredo; Ornella | Alfredo; Karen; Kevin; Miguel M. | none | | | |
| Nominated by the Eliminated | none | Miguel M. | ~~Martha~~; Alfredo | Karen | Isabella S. | Nataly | Camilo D. | Martha | Miguel M. Isabella S. | Diana | Kevin | Julián | Alfredo | Martha | Martha | Martha | none | | | | |
| Karen | Martha | ~~Mafe~~ | Julián | Martha | Mafe | Julián | Mafe | Isabella S. | Julián; Omar | S. González; Julián | Miguel M. Diana | Martha; Isabella S. | ~~Julián~~; ~~Martha~~ | S. González; Ornella | Julián; Ornella | S. González; Julián | No Nomination | No Nomination | | Winner (Day 128) | |
| Julián | Johana | Sandra | Camilo D. | Natalia | Ornella | Juan D. | Miguel M. | Miguel M. | Ornella; Diana | ~~Camilo~~; ~~Ornella~~ | Mafe; Isabella S. | Camilo; Miguel M. | Camilo; Ornella | Kevin; Alfredo | Alfredo; Miguel M. | Alfredo; Ornella | No Nomination | | Finalist | Runner-up (Day 128) | |
| Miguel M. | Martha | ~~Mafe~~ | Beto | Martha | Banned | Julián | Kevin | Mafe | Julián; Mafe | Omar; Martha | Diana; Miguel B. | Martha; Isabella S. | ~~Julián~~; ~~Martha~~ | S. González; Kevin | Julián; Alfredo | S. González; Julián | No Nomination | No Nomination | | 3rd Place (Day 128) | |
| S. González | Not in House | | | | | | | Exempt | Ornella; Alfredo | Kevin; Ornella | Miguel B. Mafe | Miguel M. Alfredo | Diana; Ornella | Diana; Ornella | Kevin; Alfredo | Alfredo; Miguel M. | No Nomination | Exempt | No Nomination | 4th Place (Day 128) | |
| Alfredo | Juan D. | ~~Mafe~~ | Omar | Julián | Mafe | Omar | Banned | Isabella S. | Julián; Omar | S. González; Isabella S. | Diana; Miguel M. | Isabella S. Martha | ~~Martha~~; ~~S. González~~ | ~~S. González~~; ~~Natalia~~ | Julián; Miguel M. | Julián; S. González | No Nomination | No Nomination | | Evicted (Day 127) | |
| Kevin | Martha | ~~Mafe~~ | Julián | Nataly | Sandra | Mafe | Banned | Isabella S. | Omar; Julián | S. González; Isabella S. | Natalia; Karen | Martha; Isabella S. | ~~Martha~~; ~~Julián~~ | S. González | Julián; Natalia | Julián; S. González | No Nomination | No Nomination | Evicted (Day 120) | | |
| Martha | S. Gutiérrez | ~~Sandra~~ | Diana | Natalia | Banned | Juan D. | Miguel M. | Miguel M. | Diana; Ornella | ~~Camilo~~; ~~Ornella~~ | Mafe; Isabella S. | Miguel M. Alfredo | Diana; Natalia | Kevin; Alfredo | Miguel M. Ornella | Karen; Miguel M. | No Nomination | Evicted (Day 113) | | | |
| Ornella | Juan D. | ~~Mafe~~ | Julián | José | Mafe | Julián | Mafe | Isabella S. | Banned | Omar; S. González | In Loft | Martha; Isabella S. | ~~Julián~~; ~~Martha~~ | S. González; Alfredo | Julián; Alfredo | Julián; S. González | Evicted (Day 106) | | | | |
| Natalia | Martha | ~~Mafe~~ | Beto | Martha | Banned | Julián | Mafe | Isabella S. | Julián; S. González | Omar; S. González | Banned | Martha; Isabella S. | ~~Julián~~; ~~Martha~~ | S. González; Alfredo | Julián; Ornella | Evicted (Day 99) | | | | | |
| Diana | Martha | ~~Mafe~~ | Beto | Omar | Mafe | ~~Omar~~ | Mafe | Isabella S. | Julián; S. González | S. González; Julián | Miguel M. Karen | Martha; S. González | ~~Julián~~; ~~Martha~~ | S. González; Natalia | Evicted (Day 92) | | | | | | |
| Juan C. | Not in House | | | | | | | Exempt | Banned | Julián; Martha | Miguel M. S. González | Isabella S. Martha | ~~Martha~~; ~~Julián~~ | Evicted (Day 88) | | | | | | | |
| Mafe | Sandra | Sandra | Nataly | Natalia | Alfredo | Juan D. | Miguel M. | Karen | Diana; Ornella | ~~Camilo~~; ~~Karen~~ | Julián; Isabella S. | Alfredo; Miguel M. | Evicted (Day 85) | | | | | | | | |
| Isabella S. | Alfredo | Johana | Beto | Isabella I. | Miguel M. | Juan D. | Sandra | Miguel M. | Diana; Ornella | ~~Camilo~~; ~~Ornella~~ | Julián; Mafe | Camilo; Alfredo | Ejected (Day 84) | | | | | | | | |
| Miguel B. | Not in House | | | | | | | Exempt | Banned | Isabella S. Julián | Melfi; S. González | Evicted (Day 78) | | | | | | | | | |
| Omar | Martha | Martha | Juan D. | Camilo D. | Alfredo | Diana | Alfredo | Diana | Ornella; Diana | Kevin; Ornella | Evicted (Day 71) | | | | | | | | | | |
| Tania | Not in House | | | | | | | Exempt | Alfredo; Diana | Evicted (Day 64) | | | | | | | | | | | |
| Juan D. | Ornella | Omar | Julián | José | José | Isabella S. | ~~Mafe~~ | Isabella S. | Evicted (Day 57) | | | | | | | | | | | | |
| Sandra | Martha | ~~Mafe~~ | Beto | Martha | Banned | Mafe | Mafe | Mafe | Evicted (Day 57) | | | | | | | | | | | | |
| Nanis | Not in House | | | | | | | Ejected (Day 54) | | | | | | | | | | | | | |
| Camilo D. | Ornella | S. Gutiérrez | Julián | Omar | Martha | Omar | Omar | Evicted (Day 50) | | | | | | | | | | | | | |
| Nataly | Martha | ~~Mafe~~ | Beto | José | José | ~~Mafe~~ | Evicted (Day 43) | | | | | | | | | | | | | | |
| S. Gutiérrez | Martha | ~~Mafe~~ | Omar | Kevin | José | ~~Omar~~ | Walked (Day 43) | | | | | | | | | | | | | | |
| José | Alfredo | Diana | Nataly | Ornella | S. Gutiérrez | Evicted (Day 36) | | | | | | | | | | | | | | | |
| Isabella I. | Martha | ~~Mafe~~ | Beto | Martha | Evicted (Day 29) | | | | | | | | | | | | | | | | |
| Beto | Ornella | Sandra | Diana | Evicted (Day 22) | | | | | | | | | | | | | | | | | |
| Johana | Martha | ~~Mafe~~ | Evicted (Day 15) | | | | | | | | | | | | | | | | | | |
| Naren | Johana | Evicted (Day 8) | | | | | | | | | | | | | | | | | | | |
| Nominated | Beto; Isabella S. José; Julián; Mafe; Martha; Naren; Ornella | Diana; Johana; José; Martha; Miguel M. Omar; Sandra; S. Gutiérrez | Alfredo; Beto; Juan D. Julián; Kevin; Omar | Diana; Isabella I. Juan D. Karen; Martha; Sandra; S. Gutiérrez | Isabella S. José; Juan D. Mafe; Miguel M. Nataly; Sandra | Juan D. Julián; Kevin; Miguel M. Nataly; Sandra | Alfredo; Camilo D. Juan D. Mafe; Miguel M Omar; Sandra | Isabella S. Juan D. Julián; Karen; Martha; Miguel M. Natalia; Sandra | Isabella S. Juan C. ~~Julián~~; Karen; Martha; Miguel M. Natalia; Omar; Tania | ~~Alfredo~~; Diana; Isabella S. Kevin; Mafe; Miguel B. Omar; S. González | Diana; Isabella S. Juan C. Karen; Kevin; Martha; Miguel B S. González | Alfredo; Diana; ~~Isabella S.~~; Juan C. Julián; Karen; Mafe; Martha; Miguel M. S. González | Alfredo; Diana; Juan C. Julián; Natalia; S. González | Alfredo; Diana; Karen; Kevin; Martha; Ornella; S. González | Alfredo; Julián; Karen; Kevin; Martha; Miguel M. Natalia; Ornella | Alfredo; Julián; Martha; Miguel M. Ornella; S. González | Alfredo; Karen; Kevin; Martha; Miguel M. | Alfredo; Julián; Karen; Kevin; Miguel M. | Alfredo; Karen; Miguel M. S. González | Julián; Karen; Miguel M. S. González | |
| Saved by the HoH(s) or another | José; Ornella | none | | Martha | Mafe | Juan D. | Mafe | Karen | Juan C. | Mafe; Diana | S. González | Diana | Diana | Martha | none | | | | | | |
| Immunity Competition Winner(s) | Isabella S. Julián | Miguel M. Sandra | Kevin | Sandra | Miguel M. | Sandra | Miguel M. | Miguel M. | Miguel M. | Isabella S. | Kevin | Alfredo | none | Alfredo | Martha | none | Kevin | Miguel M. | none | | |
| Against public vote | Beto; Mafe; Martha; Naren | Diana; Johana; José; Martha; Omar; S. Gutiérrez | Alfredo; Beto; Juan D. Julián; Omar | Diana; Isabella I. Juan D. Karen; S. Gutiérrez | Isabella S. José; Juan D. Nataly; Sandra | Julián; Kevin; Miguel M. Nataly | Alfredo; Camilo D. Juan D. Omar; Sandra | Isabella S. Juan D. Julián; Martha; Natalia; Sandra | Isabella S. Karen; Martha; Natalia; Omar; Tania | Kevin; Miguel B Omar; S. González | Diana; Isabella S. Juan C. Karen; Martha; Miguel B. | Juan C. Julián; Karen; Mafe; Martha; Miguel M. S. González | Alfredo; Juan C. Julián; Natalia; S. González | Diana; Karen; Kevin; Ornella; S. González | ~~Alfredo~~; Julián; Karen; ~~Kevin~~; ~~Miguel M.~~; Natalia; Ornella | Alfredo; Julián; Martha; Miguel M. Ornella; S. González | Alfredo; Karen; Martha; Miguel M. | Alfredo; Julián; Karen; Kevin | Alfredo; Karen; Miguel M. S. González | Julián; Karen; Miguel M. S. González | |
| Saved | Beto; Mafe; Martha (to save) | Martha; 35.31% (Out of 6); Omar; 20.39% (Out of 6); S. Gutiérrez; 24.31% (Out of 4); José; 36.20% (Out of 3); Diana (Out of 2) | Alfredo; 32% Julián; 22% Juan D.(Out of 3); Omar (Out of 3) | Diana; Karen; Juan D. S. Gutiérrez (to save) | Ornella; 24.07% Isabella S. 22.80% Nataly; 17.73% Juan D. 17.70% | Julián; 43.71% Kevin; 32.63% Miguel M. 12.56% | Omar; 24.87% Alfredo; 20.50% Juan D. 18.40% Sandra; 18.32% | Natalia; 36.51% Julián; 15.81% Martha; 15.24% Isabella S. 14.89% | Natalia; 30.93% Karen; 30.65% Martha; 23.93% Isabella S. 7.05% Omar; 4.90% | Kevin; 35.03% Miguel B. 28.22% S. González; 25.38% | Karen; 28.37% Martha; 22.78% Diana; 15.11% Isabella S. 13.99% Juan C. 10.29% | Karen; 33.06% Miguel M. 22.58% Julián; 12.43% Juan C. 10.69% Martha; 8.72% S. González; 7.84% | Natalia; 31.41% Julián; 24.40% Alfredo; 19.43% S. González; 14.22% | S. González; 45.25% Karen; 16.15% Ornella; 14.10% Kevin; 12.34% | Julián; 45.11% Ornella; 24.26% Karen; 16.96% | Julián; 22.04% Martha; 17.63% Miguel M. 16.14% Alfredo; 15.45% S. González; 14.55% | Miguel M. 0.66% Karen; 3.08% Alfredo; 43.05% | Julián; 57.31% Karen; 26.22% Alfredo; 10.83% | Karen; Miguel M. S. González (to save) | Karen; 51.27% to win | Julián; 38.39% to win |
| Evicted | Naren | Johana (out of 2) | Beto; 9.5% | Isabella I. | José; 17.69% | Nataly; 11.10% | Camilo D. 17.91% | Juan D. 14.75% Sandra; 2.80% | Tania; 2.49% | Omar; 11.37% | Miguel B. 9.47% | Mafe; 4.68% | Juan C. 10.54% | Diana; 12.15% | Natalia; 13.67% | Ornella; 14.20% | Martha; 53.21% | Kevin; 5.64% | Alfredo | Miguel M. 9.38% to win | S. González; 0.96% to win |
| Walked | none | | | | | S. Gutiérrez | none | | | | | | | | | | | | | | |
| Ejected | none | | | | | | | Nanis | none | | | Isabella S. | none | | | | | | | | |

== Episodes ==
| No. | Title | Original release date | Colombia viewers (Rating points) |
|---|---|---|---|
Week 1
| 1 | "Se abren las puertas de la casa" | 11 February 2024 | 5.9 |
| 2 | "Eligiendo al segundo nominado" | 12 February 2024 | 6.1 |
| 3 | "Ya hay cuatro nominados y dos líderes" | 13 February 2024 | 5.6 |
| 4 | "Sorprendentes decisiones" | 14 February 2024 | 5.2 |
| 5 | "Nominaciones inesperadas" | 15 February 2024 | 5.8 |
| 6 | "Un gran carnaval y salvaciones" | 16 February 2024 | 5.0 |
| 7 | "Dos famosos se salvaron de ir a eliminación" | 17 February 2024 | 2.4 |
| 8 | "Se conoció el primer eliminado de La casa de los famosos" | 18 February 2024 | 3.7 |
Week 2
| 9 | "¡Nuevo líder de la semana!" | 19 February 2024 | 5.4 |
| 10 | "Corriendo por el mercado" | 20 February 2024 | 4.4 |
| 11 | "Nominaciones válidas e inválidas" | 21 February 2024 | 5.0 |
| 12 | "Discusiones y tensiones en la casa" | 22 February 2024 | 4.5 |
| 13 | "Una fiesta de otro planeta" | 23 February 2024 | 4.1 |
| 14 | "Cumpleaños y salvaciones" | 24 February 2024 | 2.9 |
| 15 | "Noche de tensión, posicionamiento y eliminación" | 25 February 2024 | 3.5 |
Week 3
| 16 | "Consecuencias por incumplir las reglas" | 26 February 2024 | 5.0 |
| 17 | "El público y los números tienen el poder" | 27 February 2024 | 5.0 |
| 18 | "Nominados y verdades de frente" | 28 February 2024 | 5.6 |
| 19 | "Dialogar para sanar" | 29 February 2024 | 5.1 |
| 20 | "Una casa sin líder" | 1 March 2024 | 5.5 |
| 21 | "La salvación es un plato dulce" | 2 March 2024 | 3.0 |
| 22 | "Intrigas y nuevas despedidas" | 3 March 2024 | 4.7 |
Week 4
| 23 | "Se reestructuran los equipos" | 4 March 2024 | 6.7 |
| 24 | "Una visita dejó congelados a los famosos" | 5 March 2024 | 7.3 |
| 25 | "La comida, un tema crítico en la casa" | 6 March 2024 | 7.8 |
| 26 | "Discusiones y una visita sorpresa" | 7 March 2024 | 7.5 |
| 27 | "Celebración del Día de la Mujer" | 8 March 2024 | 6.9 |
| 28 | "Dos famosos se salvan de la eliminación" | 9 March 2024 | 4.1 |
| 29 | "Esposo de Nataly Umaña la visitó" | 10 March 2024 | 6.5 |
Week 5
| 30 | "Dos habitantes nuevos" | 11 March 2024 | 8.3 |
| 31 | "El hambre genera discordia" | 12 March 2024 | 7.7 |
| 32 | "Nominaciones y una visita" | 13 March 2024 | 8.2 |
| 33 | "Ruptura y beneficios" | 14 March 2024 | 8.1 |
| 34 | "Discusión por un beneficio" | 15 March 2024 | 6.2 |
| 35 | "La salvación se construye" | 16 March 2024 | 4.3 |
| 36 | "Reconciliaciones y despedidas" | 17 March 2024 | 5.9 |
Week 6
| 37 | "El amor se acaba" | 18 March 2024 | 7.1 |
| 38 | "Correr para ganar" | 19 March 2024 | 7.2 |
| 39 | "Nominaciones inesperadas" | 20 March 2024 | 7.5 |
| 40 | "Palabras de aliento" | 21 March 2024 | 7.6 |
| 41 | "Noche de ángeles y demonios" | 22 March 2024 | 7.2 |
| 42 | "Sábado de salvación y romance" | 23 March 2024 | 3.8 |
| 43 | "Dos emotivas despedidas" | 24 March 2024 | 5.1 |
Week 7
| 44 | "Famosa repite liderazgo" | 25 March 2024 | 6.1 |
| 45 | "El cuarto de la discordia" | 26 March 2024 | 7.0 |
| 46 | "Decisiones polémicas" | 27 March 2024 | 5.4 |
| 47 | "Séptima nominación" | 28 March 2024 | 3.7 |
| 48 | "Noche de cartas especiales" | 29 March 2024 | 5.3 |
| 49 | "Dos participantes salvados" | 30 March 2024 | 4.2 |
| 50 | "Séptimo eliminado" | 31 March 2024 | 6.2 |
Week 8
| 51 | "Los nuevos participantes" | 1 April 2024 | 7.5 |
| 52 | "Llegó la visita más esperada" | 2 April 2024 | 7.3 |
| 53 | "Inicia el caos en la casa" | 3 April 2024 | 7.6 |
| 54 | "Dos nuevos congelados" | 4 April 2024 | 6.6 |
| 55 | "Una mujer entra a la casa" | 5 April 2024 | 6.5 |
| 56 | "Una participante expulsada" | 6 April 2024 | 5.0 |
| 57 | "Dos participantes eliminados" | 7 April 2024 | 6.6 |
Week 9
| 58 | "Liderazgo en medio del caos" | 8 April 2024 | 6.9 |
| 59 | "La película que generó desacuerdos" | 9 April 2024 | 6.5 |
| 60 | "Nueve famosos en la placa" | 10 April 2024 | 7.7 |
| 61 | "El laberinto de la salvación" | 11 April 2024 | 7.6 |
| 62 | "Dos meses de convivencia" | 12 April 2024 | 6.3 |
| 63 | "Dos salvaciones sorprendentes" | 13 April 2024 | 4.3 |
| 64 | "El décimo eliminado" | 14 April 2024 | 6.1 |
Week 10
| 65 | "Melfi, el líder de la semana" | 15 April 2024 | 7.6 |
| 66 | "¿Castigo o beneficio?" | 16 April 2024 | 6.0 |
| 67 | "A una llamada de la salvación" | 17 April 2024 | 6.0 |
| 68 | "Un intercambio trascendental" | 18 April 2024 | 5.9 |
| 69 | "Un día sin agua en la casa" | 19 April 2024 | 5.2 |
| 70 | "Una salvación enredada" | 20 April 2024 | 4.3 |
| 71 | "Todos son nominados" | 21 April 2024 | 6.4 |
Week 11
| 72 | "Terminan las treguas" | 22 April 2024 | 6.0 |
| 73 | "Las misiones de Carla" | 23 April 2024 | 7.0 |
| 74 | "Un emotivo regreso" | 24 April 2024 | 6.5 |
| 75 | "Una divertida visita" | 25 April 2024 | 5.9 |
| 76 | "Una fiesta de otra época" | 26 April 2024 | 5.9 |
| 77 | "Ganador invicto" | 27 April 2024 | 4.8 |
| 78 | "Miguel Bueno se fue" | 28 April 2024 | 6.5 |
Week 12
| 79 | "Dos emocionantes visitas" | 29 April 2024 | 5.6 |
| 80 | "Sin mercado suficiente" | 30 April 2024 | 5.6 |
| 81 | "Siete participantes en la placa" | 1 May 2024 | 5.4 |
| 82 | "La Segura dijo ¡Sí!" | 2 May 2024 | 6.0 |
| 83 | "Wendy Guevara en la casa" | 3 May 2024 | 5.3 |
| 84 | "Una expulsada y dos salvados" | 4 May 2024 | 3.9 |
| 85 | "Mafe regresó a su planeta" | 5 May 2024 | 6.7 |
Week 13
| 86 | "Semana de revolución" | 6 May 2024 | 5.9 |
| 87 | "Martes de mercado y nominaciones" | 7 May 2024 | 5.4 |
| 88 | "Los papillentes despiden a un integrante" | 8 May 2024 | 5.8 |
| 89 | "El equipo Galáctico toma el control" | 9 May 2024 | 5.3 |
| 90 | "Segunda noche de nominaciones" | 10 May 2024 | 5.1 |
| 91 | "Un reto de equilibrio para la salvación" | 11 May 2024 | 3.3 |
| 92 | "Una triste eliminación" | 12 May 2024 | 4.2 |
Week 14
| 93 | "Sorpresivo liderazgo" | 13 May 2024 | 4.3 |
| 94 | "Comienza el exilio" | 14 May 2024 | 6.0 |
| 95 | "Nuevos exiliados" | 15 May 2024 | 6.2 |
| 96 | "Prueba de beneficio entre el exilio y La casa" | 16 May 2024 | 5.1 |
| 97 | "Cinco famosos en riesgo" | 17 May 2024 | 5.5 |
| 98 | "Una galáctica se salvó" | 18 May 2024 | 3.9 |
| 99 | "La Segura es la decimosexta eliminada" | 19 May 2024 | 6.9 |
Week 15
| 100 | "Cien días de competencia" | 20 May 2024 | 6.0 |
| 101 | "La llave maestra" | 21 May 2024 | 6.1 |
| 102 | "Nataly nuevamente en la casa" | 22 May 2024 | 6.4 |
| 103 | "Una llamada reconfortante" | 23 May 2024 | 5.2 |
| 104 | "Vuelve el viernes de fiesta" | 24 May 2024 | 5.1 |
| 105 | "Sábado de película, pillaron a Sebastián González" | 25 May 2024 | 4.6 |
| 106 | "Día de juicio y Gala de eliminación" | 26 May 2024 | 6.3 |
Week 16
| 107 | "El último líder de la casa" | 27 May 2024 | 6.5 |
| 108 | "Segundo nominado del top 7" | 28 May 2024 | 5.7 |
| 109 | "Quiz sobre el programa y tercer nominado" | 29 May 2024 | 5.2 |
| 110 | "Prueba de beneficio y cuarto nominado por el público" | 30 May 2024 | 5.6 |
| 111 | "Viernes de vallenato" | 31 May 2024 | 4.6 |
| 112 | "Reflexiones, elegancia y salvación" | 1 June 2024 | 4.2 |
| 113 | "El equipo Galáctico se desmorona" | 2 June 2024 | 5.7 |
Week 17
| 114 | "A unos puntos de la semifinal" | 3 June 2024 | 4.2 |
| 115 | "Nuevos líderes en la tabla" | 4 June 2024 | 4.2 |
| 116 | "Los números son decisivos" | 5 June 2024 | 3.8 |
| 117 | "Dos llamadas decisivas" | 6 June 2024 | 4.5 |
| 118 | "Sebastián González, primer semifinalista" | 7 June 2024 | 4.5 |
| 119 | "Se conoce al segundo semifinalista" | 8 June 2024 | 3.7 |
| 120 | "Un participante ocupa el sexto lugar" | 9 June 2024 | 4.3 |
Week 18
| 121 | "Ingreso de jefes de campaña" | 10 June 2024 | 4.9 |
| 122 | "Inician las campañas" | 11 June 2024 | 4.9 |
| 123 | "Gran debate" | 12 June 2024 | 4.8 |
| 124 | "Campaña y concierto" | 13 June 2024 | 4.9 |
| 125 | "Primer finalista" | 14 June 2024 | 4.2 |
| 126 | "La última cena" | 15 June 2024 | 3.2 |
| 127 | "Última eliminación hacia la gran final" | 16 June 2024 | 4.5 |
| 128 | "¡Gran final!" | 17 June 2024 | 7.9 |
