= La casa de los famosos Colombia =

Colombian reality television series

- Genre: Reality television
- Based on: Big Brother by John de Mol Jr.
- Presented by: Cristina Hurtado; Carla Giraldo; Marcelo Cezán
- Country of origin: Colombia
- Original language: Spanish
- No. of seasons: 3
- No. of episodes: 400

Production
- Production locations: Bogotá, Colombia
- Camera setup: Multi-camera
- Production company: RCN Televisión

Original release
- Network: Canal RCN
- Release: 11 February 2024 – present

Related
- Gran Hermano (2003–2012); La casa de los famosos (2021–); La casa de los famosos México (2023–)

La casa de los famosos Colombia (LCFC) is a Colombian reality television that premiered on Canal RCN on 11 February 2024. The series follows the format pioneered by the Dutch franchise Big Brother, known as Gran Hermano in Spanish speaking countries, created by John de Mol Jr. in 1999.

La casa de los famosos Colombia is the second version of the show held in Colombia, being preceded by two seasons of Big Brother, broadcast by the Caracol Televisión and Citytv channels in 2003 and 2012, respectively. However, it is the first edition of the franchise developed in Colombia using competition between celebrities as a primary audience draw. The show is a direct adaptation of the American program of the same name which premiered in 2021 on the Telemundo network, and is the second version of this format to be carried out globally, after the broadcast of La casa de los famosos México in 2023.

In June 2025, the series was renewed for a third season, that premiered on 12 January 2026.

== Format ==
As in the international franchise Big Brother, La casa de los famosos Colombia follows a group of contestants, in this case celebrities, who stay inside an expansive mansion for a predetermined period of time. One of the main aspects of the series are the 24-hour live feeds which allows viewers to watch the day-to-day activities of the cast at all times. During their time in the mansion, the celebrity contestants compete in weekly physical and logical tests, puzzles and competitions in order to avoid elimination. Contestants are eliminated by an online viewer ballot. The challenges are categorized according to their level of importance; the five categories are as follows:

- Prueba de líder (Head of Household Competition): The contestants compete to become the "leader" of the house. Being leader gives the contestant a set of rewards and benefits for the development of the game.
- Prueba de presupuesto (Budget Task): This competition determines the distribution of the resources available to competitors throughout the week.
- Nominación (Nomination): All contestants cast a ballot to nominate one of their opponents for elimination. If a contestant is nominated they can be eliminated at the Elimination Gala.
- Prueba de salvación (Salvation Competition): This gives nominated contestants the ability to prevent their name from being available to viewers in the Elimination Gala.
- Gala de eliminación (Elimination Gala): On the last day of every week, viewers vote on which nominated contestant is eliminated from the show. Elimination means removal from the mansion and an inability to win the grand prize.

== Production ==
In August 2023, it was reported that Canal RCN had acquired the format La casa de los famosos, itself based on the franchise Celebrity Big Brother. Cristina Hurtado and Carla Giraldo were announced as hosts of the program. The construction of the mansion began at the end of 2023 in Bogotá, Colombia. The space has an area of approximately 2,000 square meters and is equipped with 40 cameras which livestream and film any events within the mansion. In December 2023, it was announced that streaming service Vix would host the 24/7 live feeds of the series. On 15 January 2024, the Panamanian television channel TVN announced its partnership with Canal RCN for the distribution of the show in Panama. The partnership included the addition of a Panamanian contestant. The premiere occurred on 11 February 2024.

On 17 June 2024, Canal RCN renewed the series for a second season. In November 2024, it was announced that Vix would not renew its contract with Canal RCN for the broadcast of the 24/7 live feeds, and instead, RCN would take over the broadcast through its digital platforms for the second season. That same month, it was announced that Cristina Hurtado wouldn't return as co-host for the second season. On 4 December 2024, Marcelo Cezán was confirmed as Hurtado's replacement. The season premiered on 26 January 2025.

On 9 June 2025. Canal RCN renewed the series for a third season. The season premiered on 12 January 2026.

== Production crew ==
Color key

Live galas host
Digital content host
Housemate
Aftershow host
Voiceover for "El Jefe"

Presenter	Seasons			Ref.
Presenter	1	2	3	Ref.
Cristina Hurtado				
Carla Giraldo				
Marcelo Cezán				
Emmanuel Restrepo				
Ornella Sierra				
Lina Tejeiro				
Roberto Velásquez				
Karen Sevillano				
Vicky Berrío				
Lucho Gardeazábal				
Gastón Velandia				

== Series overview ==
Series	Episodes	Originally released		Days	HouseGuests	Winner	Runner–up	Final vote
Series	Episodes	First released	Last released	Days	HouseGuests	Winner	Runner–up	Final vote
1	128	11 February 2024	17 June 2024	128	27	Karen Sevillano	Julián Trujillo	51.27–38.39%
2	134	26 January 2025	9 June 2025	135	27	Andrés Altafulla	Melissa Gate	51.84–44.81%
3	138	12 January 2026	29 May 2026	138	28	Alejandro Estrada	Juanda Caribe	63.87–28.11%

== Reception ==
=== Ratings ===
Season	Timeslot (COT)	Episodes	First aired		Last aired		Avg. viewers (in points)
Season	Timeslot (COT)	Episodes	Date	Viewers (in points)	Date	Viewers (in points)	Avg. viewers (in points)
1	Sun–Sat 9:00 p.m. (1–71, 82–128); Sun–Sat 8:00 p.m. (72–81)	128	11 February 2024	5.9	17 June 2024	7.9	5.6
2	Sun–Sat 9:00 p.m	134	26 January 2025	4.6	9 June 2025	6.6	6.0
3	Sun–Sat 8:00 p.m	138	12 January 2026	4.2	29 May 2026	6.5	3.6

=== Awards and nominations ===
Year	Award	Category	Nominated	Result	Ref
2025	Produ Awards	Best Adapted Coexistence and Relationships Reality Series	La casa de los famosos Colombia	Nominated	
2025	Produ Awards	Best Reality Show Host	Carla Giraldo	Nominated	

== See also ==
- Gran Hermano
- La casa de los famosos
- La casa de los famosos México
