= La casa de los famosos Colombia season 3 =

Reality show season

La casa de los famosos Colombia
- Season 3
- Hosted by: Carla Giraldo; Marcelo Cezán
- No. of days: 138
- No. of houseguests: 28
- Winner: Alejandro Estrada
- Runner-up: Juanda Caribe
- No. of episodes: 138

Release
- Original network: Canal RCN
- Original release: 12 January – 29 May 2026

Season chronology
- ← Previous; Season 2

The third season of the Colombian reality television series La casa de los famosos Colombia premiered on 12 January 2026, with a live move-in on Canal RCN. The show follows a group of celebrities living in a house together while being constantly filmed with no communication with the outside world as they compete to be the last housemate remaining to win the cash grand prize.

The season was announced on 9 June 2025. Carla Giraldo and Marcelo Cezán returned as co-host of the series. The season concluded on 29 May 2026, after 138 days of competition with Alejandro Estrada being crowned the winner, and Juanda Caribe the runner-up.

== Housemates ==
Name	Age	Hometown	Occupation	Day entered	Day exited	Status	Ref.
Alejandro Estrada	46	Cúcuta	Actor	1	138	Winner	
Juanda Caribe	31	Barranquilla	Comedian and influencer	1	138	Runner-up	
Valentino Lázaro	26	Medellín	Influencer	1	138	3rd Place	
Esteban "Tebi" Bernal	38	Medellín	Model and influencer	1	138	4th Place	
Valerie de la Cruz "Beba"	26	Barranquilla	Influencer	1	63	Evicted	
Valerie de la Cruz "Beba"	26	Barranquilla	Influencer	75	133	Evicted	
Mariana Zapata	24	Medellín	Influencer	1	126	Evicted	
Franck Luna "Campanita"	22	Cali	Influencer and dancer	1	119	Evicted	
Alexa Torrex	25	Cúcuta	Singer and influencer	1	112	Evicted	
Aura Cristina Geithner	59	Bogotá	Actress	79	105	Evicted	
Juan Carlos Arango	61	Cali	Actor	38	98	Evicted	
Karola Alcendra	24	Cartagena	Influencer	29	91	Evicted	
Eidevin López	26	Valledupar	Actor and influencer	1	88	Expelled	
Marilyn Patiño	43	Cali	Actress and singer	1	28	Evicted	
Marilyn Patiño	43	Cali	Actress and singer	75	84	Evicted	
Yuli Ruiz	32	Calarcá	Influencer and model	1	77	Evicted	
Manuela Gómez	36	Medellín	Influencer	1	74	Evicted	
Juan Palau	30	Bogotá	Singer and actor	1	70	Evicted	
Juanse Laverde	19	Bogotá	Singer	1	56	Evicted	
Lady Noriega	55	Montería	Actress and singer	38	52	Evicted	
Lorena Altamirano	35	Cali	Actress	1	49	Evicted	
Nicolás Arrieta	34	Bogotá	Influencer	1	42	Evicted	
Maiker Smith	34	Apartadó	Influencer	1	39	Evicted	
Jay Torres	32	Carolina, Puerto Rico	Singer and model	1	35	Evicted	
Sara Uribe	35	Medellín	Model and TV host	1	28	Evicted	
Johanna Fadul	40	Bogotá	Actress	1	22	Expelled	
Sofía Jaramillo	36	Cali	Model and actress	1	21	Evicted	
Renzo Meneses	29	Barranquilla	Model	1	14	Evicted	
Luisa Cortina	31	Sincelejo	Influencer	1	7	Evicted	
Marcela Reyes	36	Armenia	Influencer and DJ	1	4	Walked	

== Episodes ==
No. overall	No. in season	Title	Original release date	Colombia viewers (Rating points)
Week 1
263	1	"La temporada de los poderes"	12 January 2026	4.2
264	2	"Un famoso queda fuera"	13 January 2026	4.3
265	3	"En la cuerda floja"	14 January 2026	4.1
266	4	"Sobres sorpresivos"	15 January 2026	3.3
267	5	"Famosos al calabozo"	16 January 2026	N/A
268	6	"Los prohibidos de la casa"	17 January 2026	2.0
269	7	"Primera eliminación y sanción"	18 January 2026	2.7
Week 2
270	8	"El terror de los famosos"	19 January 2026	3.6
271	9	"Sobre bueno y sobre malo"	20 January 2026	2.8
272	10	"Una robusta placa de nominados"	21 January 2026	2.7
273	11	"Castigo para toda la casa"	22 January 2026	3.7
274	12	"Calculando el tiempo"	23 January 2026	3.0
275	13	"Todo se salió de control"	24 January 2026	2.1
276	14	"Reñida eliminación"	25 January 2026	4.1
Week 3
277	15	"Supervillano de la semana"	26 January 2026	3.3
278	16	"Misión que sacudió la casa"	27 January 2026	3.5
279	17	"Máquina de la verdad"	28 January 2026	3.5
280	18	"Reconciliación inesperada"	29 January 2026	3.1
281	19	"Mensajes que reconfortan"	30 January 2026	2.7
282	20	"Supervillano en aprietos"	31 January 2026	2.2
283	21	"Amistades que terminan"	1 February 2026	3.8
Week 4
284	22	"La decisión del jefe"	2 February 2026	3.8
285	23	"Sin presupuesto en la casa"	3 February 2026	3.2
286	24	"El juicio de los famosos"	4 February 2026	3.0
287	25	"Revolcón de habitaciones"	5 February 2026	3.5
288	26	"Valentino se confesó"	6 February 2026	2.8
289	27	"La noche salsera"	7 February 2026	2.6
290	28	"Por partida doble"	8 February 2026	3.9
Week 5
291	29	"¡Karola congeló a varios!"	9 February 2026	3.9
292	30	"¿Suenan campanas de boda?"	10 February 2026	2.7
293	31	"Las banderas definieron"	11 February 2026	2.8
294	32	"Juanda quedó congelado"	12 February 2026	2.6
295	33	"Primera función de cine"	13 February 2026	2.6
296	34	"Gala de premios"	14 February 2026	2.3
297	35	"Un adiós internacional"	15 February 2026	3.5
Week 6
298	36	"El video de la discordia"	16 February 2026	3.2
299	37	"Congelados por partida doble"	17 February 2026	3.3
300	38	"Lady y Juancho ingresan"	18 February 2026	4.1
301	39	"Maiker se fue en camión"	19 February 2026	4.3
302	40	"La hija de Tebi"	20 February 2026	3.9
303	41	"Valetino quedó seco"	21 February 2026	2.5
304	42	"Adiós al aprendiz de baile"	22 February 2026	3.9
Week 7
305	43	"El regreso de Melissa Gate"	23 February 2026	5.0
306	44	"Nuevos encantamientos y presupuesto"	24 February 2026	4.0
307	45	"El pozo de los encantamientos"	25 February 2026	4.2
308	46	"Valentino cruzó los límites"	26 February 2026	3.7
309	47	"Yuli Ruiz recibió sanción"	27 February 2026	4.1
310	48	"Un show de talentos polémico"	28 February 2026	2.4
311	49	"Posicionamiento con Melissa incluida"	1 March 2026	3.2
Week 8
312	50	"Juanda Caribe es sancionado"	2 March 2026	4.2
313	51	"El teléfono da las instrucciones"	3 March 2026	4.0
314	52	"Eliminado sin salvación"	4 March 2026	3.5
315	53	"Un liderazgo luchado"	5 March 2026	3.2
316	54	"Una nominación llena de huevos"	6 March 2026	3.5
317	55	"Noche de cabaret"	7 March 2026	2.4
318	56	"Juanse Laverde no va más"	8 March 2026	3.5
Week 9
319	57	"Todos a la placa"	9 March 2026	3.3
320	58	"Una salvación selectiva"	10 March 2026	3.3
321	59	"Salvando con flores"	11 March 2026	3.8
322	60	"Salvación de Tetris"	12 March 2026	3.5
323	61	"¿El fin de tormenta?"	13 March 2026	3.4
324	62	"Parranda vallenata"	14 March 2026	2.3
325	63	"Eliminación sin porcentajes"	15 March 2026	3.4
Week 10
326	64	"Ingreso de Altafulla"	16 March 2026	3.9
327	65	"Primera función del cine"	17 March 2026	3.7
328	66	"Nominaciones entre parejas"	18 March 2026	3.7
329	67	"Salvación por caja de pandora"	19 March 2026	3.5
330	68	"Regresó la papilla"	20 March 2026	3.5
331	69	"Fiesta de época"	21 March 2026	2.2
332	70	"Un congelado desató tensión"	22 March 2026	3.1
Week 11
333	71	"Líder y sobre misterioso"	23 March 2026	3.8
334	72	"Poder de la resurrección"	24 March 2026	3.8
335	73	"Nominación salvaje"	25 March 2026	3.7
336	74	"Regresó el camión de la mudanza"	26 March 2026	4.2
337	75	"Dos famosas resucitaron"	27 March 2026	3.7
338	76	"Fiesta del Lejano Oeste"	28 March 2026	2.6
339	77	"Yuli Ruiz es eliminada"	29 March 2026	3.5
Week 12
340	78	"Poder de la paranoia"	31 March 2026	3.9
341	79	"Aura Cristina es nueva participante"	31 March 2026	4.2
342	80	"Una peligrosa placa parcial"	1 April 2026	3.9
343	81	"Sorpresas en la placa"	2 April 2026	3.4
344	82	"El teléfono cambia la placa"	3 April 2026	2.8
345	83	"Fiesta de casino"	4 April 2026	2.1
346	84	"Fuerte posicionamiento y eliminación"	5 April 2026	4.7
Week 13
347	85	"Líder invisible"	6 April 2026	4.1
348	86	"Carla Giraldo aliada del líder invisible"	7 April 2026	3.9
349	87	"Participantes en manos del público"	8 April 2026	3.9
350	88	"Expulsión y emotivas reacciones"	9 April 2026	4.4
351	89	"Castigo historico"	10 April 2026	N/A
352	90	"Besos van, besos vienen"	11 April 2026	2.3
353	91	"Eliminación en negativo"	12 April 2026	4.5
Week 14
354	92	"Liderazgo y amigo secreto"	13 April 2026	4.1
355	93	"Función de cine y el fin de una amistad"	14 April 2026	3.5
356	94	"Nominaciones con poderes inesperados"	15 April 2026	4.1
357	95	"Se terminó el destierro"	16 April 2026	4.3
358	96	"Una Navidad adelantada"	17 April 2026	3.9
359	97	"Besos teatrales"	18 April 2026	3.0
360	98	"Juancho Arango es eliminado"	19 April 2026	4.5
Week 15
361	99	"Sofía visita y Tebi llora"	20 April 2026	3.7
362	100	"Cumplen 100 días"	21 April 2026	5.1
363	101	"Apretada nominación con bolas"	22 April 2026	4.6
364	102	"Karinazos en la casa"	23 April 2026	3.7
365	103	"Un beneficio que causó revuelo"	24 April 2026	3.6
366	104	"Fiesta cavernícola"	25 April 2026	2.9
367	105	"Salvación a último momento"	26 April 2026	5.3
Week 16
368	106	"Contundente congelado"	27 April 2026	4.3
369	107	"Presupuesto con cena especial"	28 April 2026	3.9
370	108	"Nominaciones apretadas"	29 April 2026	3.7
371	109	"Decisiones inesperadas"	30 April 2026	3.4
372	110	"Emiro en la casa"	1 May 2026	2.9
373	111	"El fin de los especialistas"	2 May 2026	2.4
374	112	"Eliminación sorpresiva"	3 May 2026	4.5
Week 17
375	113	"Conexión de Alexa y nuevo liderazgo"	4 May 2026	3.9
376	114	"Violeta Bergonzi invitada VIP"	5 May 2026	3.8
377	115	"Rogelio Pataquiva invitado VIP"	6 May 2026	4.0
378	116	"Kimberly Reyes invitada VIP"	7 May 2026	3.5
379	117	"La oportunidad de irse"	8 May 2026	4.1
380	118	"La pijamada real"	9 May 2026	1.9
381	119	"Campanita fuera del Top 6"	10 May 2026	3.8
Week 18
382	120	"Los factos de Campanita"	11 May 2026	3.9
383	121	"Entreteniendo al Jefe IA"	12 May 2026	3.8
384	122	"Una carga pesada"	13 May 2026	3.5
385	123	"Alexa regresa para ayudar a la IA"	14 May 2026	3.6
386	124	"El beneficio conmovió a los famosos"	15 May 2026	3.6
387	125	"Día de marioneta y fiesta hawaiana"	16 May 2026	2.0
388	126	"Una eliminación que pocos esperaban"	17 May 2026	4.2
Week 19
389	127	"El último liderazgo"	18 May 2026	4.4
390	128	"Convivencia en familia"	19 May 2026	3.4
391	129	"Nominación en familia"	20 May 2026	4.0
392	130	"La suerte del juego"	21 May 2026	4.4
393	131	"Usando el poder de salvación"	22 May 2026	4.4
394	132	"La graduación del TOP 5"	23 May 2026	2.8
395	133	"Confirmados los finalistas"	24 May 2026	4.0
Week 20
396	134	"Ingresaron los jefes de campaña"	25 May 2026	3.9
397	135	"Un llamado de atención"	26 May 2026	4.1
398	136	"Argumentos para ganar"	27 May 2026	4.6
399	137	"El beso de la temporada"	28 May 2026	4.2
400	138	"La historia no termina"	29 May 2026	6.5
