= La casa de los famosos Colombia season 2 =

Reality show season

La casa de los famosos Colombia
- Season 2
- Hosted by: Carla Giraldo; Marcelo Cezán
- No. of days: 135
- No. of houseguests: 27
- Winner: Andrés Altafulla
- Runner-up: Melissa Gate
- No. of episodes: 134

Release
- Original network: Canal RCN
- Original release: 26 January – 9 June 2025

Season chronology
- ← Previous; Season 1 Next → Season 3

The second season of the Colombian reality television series La casa de los famosos Colombia premiered on 26 January 2025, with a live move-in on Canal RCN. The show follows a group of celebrities living in a house together while being constantly filmed with no communication with the outside world as they compete to be the last competitor remaining to win the cash grand prize.

The season was announced on 17 June 2024. Carla Giraldo returned as co-host of the series. Cristina Hurtado did not return as co-host and was replaced by Marcelo Cezán. The season concluded on 9 June 2025, after 135 days of competition with Andrés Altafulla being crowned the winner, and Melissa Gate the runner-up.

== Housemates ==
| Name | Age | Hometown | Occupation | Day entered | Day exited | Status | Ref. |
|---|---|---|---|---|---|---|---|
| Andrés Altafulla | 32 | Barranquilla, Colombia | Singer | 63 | 135 | Winner | |
| Melissa Gate | 33 | Medellín, Colombia | Influencer and reality TV star | 1 | 135 | Runner-up | |
| Emiro Navarro | 22 | Magangué, Colombia | Influencer | 1 | 135 | 3rd Place | |
| Toxi Costeña | 28 | Sincelejo, Colombia | Singer | 1 | 135 | 4th Place | |
| Valentina Ruiz "La Jesuu" | 23 | Cali, Colombia | Influencer | 1 | 29 | Evicted | |
| Valentina Ruiz "La Jesuu" | 23 | Cali, Colombia | Influencer | 89 | 131 | Evicted | |
| Mateo Varela | 30 | Medellín, Colombia | Athlete and reality TV star | 1 | 127 | Evicted | |
| Camilo Trujillo | 34 | Neiva, Colombia | Actor | 1 | 120 | Evicted | |
| Fernando Solórzano | 61 | Cartagena, Colombia | Actor | 1 | 113 | Evicted | |
| Yina Calderón | 33 | Oporapa, Colombia | DJ and businesswoman | 1 | 109 | Evicted | |
| Karina Garcia | 34 | Yolombó, Colombia | Influencer and model | 1 | 106 | Evicted | |
| Norma Nivia | 45 | Líbano, Colombia | Actress and model | 1 | 99 | Evicted | |
| Lady Tabares | 43 | Medellín, Colombia | Actress and businesswoman | 1 | 92 | Evicted | |
| Mauricio "Liendra" Gomez | 25 | Medellín, Colombia | Influencer | 1 | 85 | Evicted | |
| Laura González | 29 | Villavicencio, Colombia | Model and businesswoman | 61 | 78 | Evicted | |
| Juan Ricardo Lozano | 59 | Bogotá, Colombia | Comedian | 1 | 71 | Evicted | |
| Luis Fernando Salas | 50 | Cali, Colombia | Actor and TV host | 1 | 64 | Evicted | |
| José Rodríguez (Note: José Rodríguez previously participated on the third season of La casa de los famosos USA.) | 30 | Cali, Colombia | Influencer and reality TV star | 1 | 57 | Evicted | |
| Sebastián Arias | 34 | Bucaramanga, Colombia | Actor and model | 40 | 50 | Evicted | |
| Aleyda Gaviria | 68 | Chinchiná, Colombia | Influencer | 1 | 50 | Evicted | |
| Yana Karpova | 27 | Moscow, Russia | Singer | 18 | 50 | Walked | |
| Mauricio Figueroa | 72 | Medellín, Colombia | Actor | 1 | 44 | Walked | |
| Gonzalo Escobar | 53 | Pereira, Colombia | Actor | 1 | 43 | Evicted | |
| Yaya Muñoz | 31 | Ibagué, Colombia | TV host and athlete | 1 | 36 | Evicted | |
| Cristian Pasquel | 32 | Bogotá, Colombia | Influencer | 1 | 22 | Evicted | |
| Marlon Solórzano | 28 | Medellín, Colombia | Model and actor | 1 | 15 | Evicted | |
| Sofía Avendaño | 34 | Medellín, Colombia | Influencer and model | 1 | 8 | Evicted | |
| Jery Sandoval | 39 | Barranquilla, Colombia | Actress and singer | 1 | 7 | Walked | |

=== Housemate exchange ===
On April 4, 2025, a housemate exchange with La casa de los famosos USA was announced. Melissa was swapped with Manelyk González from La casa de los famosos: All-Stars on Day 73, and returned to the house on Day 77.

== Episodes ==
| No. overall | No. in season | Title | Original release date | Colombia viewers (Rating points) |
|---|---|---|---|---|
Week 1
| 129 | 1 | "Los famosos entran a la casa" | 26 January 2025 | 4.6 |
| 130 | 2 | "Tensiones y una nueva nominación" | 27 January 2025 | 5.2 |
| 131 | 3 | "Melissa ingresa a la casa" | 28 January 2025 | 4.1 |
| 132 | 4 | "Los primeros nominados" | 29 January 2025 | 5.5 |
| 133 | 5 | "La salvación en juego" | 30 January 2025 | 5.0 |
| 134 | 6 | "Conflictos por la comida" | 31 January 2025 | 4.7 |
| 135 | 7 | "La tensión se apodera de la casa" | 1 February 2025 | 3.0 |
| 136 | 8 | "Una participante es eliminada por votación" | 2 February 2025 | 4.6 |
Week 2
| 137 | 9 | "Norma Nivia es la nueva líder" | 3 February 2025 | 5.2 |
| 138 | 10 | "Celebración y visita a la despensa" | 4 February 2025 | 4.6 |
| 139 | 11 | "Nominaciones de impacto" | 5 February 2025 | 4.8 |
| 140 | 12 | "Enfrentamiento por la salvación" | 6 February 2025 | 4.5 |
| 141 | 13 | "Nominación sorpresa" | 7 February 2025 | 4.6 |
| 142 | 14 | "Una prueba negativa" | 8 February 2025 | 4.1 |
| 143 | 15 | "Corazones rotos y despedida" | 9 February 2025 | 4.1 |
Week 3
| 144 | 16 | "Visitas inesperadas" | 10 February 2025 | 6.3 |
| 145 | 17 | "Amor, lágrimas y sanciones" | 11 February 2025 | 6.3 |
| 146 | 18 | "Una nueva famosa llega a La casa" | 12 February 2025 | 5.8 |
| 147 | 19 | "Día de juicios y visitas especiales" | 13 February 2025 | 5.5 |
| 148 | 20 | "La Liendra recibió una visita muy esperada" | 14 February 2025 | 5.4 |
| 149 | 21 | "San Valentín en La casa" | 15 February 2025 | 4.3 |
| 150 | 22 | "Noche de estrategia" | 16 February 2025 | 5.8 |
Week 4
| 151 | 23 | "Drama, estrategia y sorpresas" | 17 February 2025 | 5.9 |
| 152 | 24 | "Famosos a prueba de mentiras" | 18 February 2025 | 5.6 |
| 153 | 25 | "La presión sube en La casa" | 19 February 2025 | 5.2 |
| 154 | 26 | "Salvación y un mensaje claro" | 20 February 2025 | 5.3 |
| 155 | 27 | "Una polémica salvación" | 21 February 2025 | 5.2 |
| 156 | 28 | "Fiesta de neón" | 22 February 2025 | 4.5 |
| 157 | 29 | "Brunch y verdad al descubierto" | 23 February 2025 | 5.6 |
Week 5
| 158 | 30 | "Una visita lo cambia todo" | 24 February 2025 | 6.3 |
| 159 | 31 | "El sobre de la tentación" | 25 February 2025 | 6.3 |
| 160 | 32 | "Una nominación con diferentes matices" | 26 February 2025 | 6.1 |
| 161 | 33 | "Sin filtros en La casa" | 27 February 2025 | 6.1 |
| 162 | 34 | "Mensajes que llenan de energía" | 28 February 2025 | 5.8 |
| 163 | 35 | "Melissa es sancionada" | 1 March 2025 | 4.6 |
| 164 | 36 | "Un adiós doloroso" | 2 March 2025 | 5.9 |
Week 6
| 165 | 37 | "Duele la ausencia de Yaya" | 3 March 2025 | 4.1 |
| 166 | 38 | "La infancia se recuerda" | 4 March 2025 | 5.1 |
| 167 | 39 | "Nominación de frente" | 5 March 2025 | 6.3 |
| 168 | 40 | "Un compañero paralizante" | 6 March 2025 | 6.5 |
| 169 | 41 | "Nuevas reglas, nuevo integrante" | 7 March 2025 | 5.5 |
| 170 | 42 | "Día de fiesta y homenajes" | 8 March 2025 | 3.6 |
| 171 | 43 | "Un nuevo hombre abandona la casa" | 9 March 2025 | 6.5 |
Week 7
| 172 | 44 | "Adiós a Mauricio" | 10 March 2025 | 6.2 |
| 173 | 45 | "Sebastián nominó en La casa" | 11 March 2025 | 6.0 |
| 174 | 46 | "Juicio, nominaciones y apariencias" | 12 March 2025 | 6.2 |
| 175 | 47 | "Yina Calderón salió de la placa" | 13 March 2025 | 6.1 |
| 176 | 48 | "La Toxi Costeña subió la tensión" | 14 March 2025 | 6.0 |
| 177 | 49 | "Sebastián en la mira" | 15 March 2025 | 4.5 |
| 178 | 50 | "Más despedidas de las esperadas" | 16 March 2025 | 6.5 |
Week 8
| 179 | 51 | "Emiro es el nuevo líder" | 17 March 2025 | 6.4 |
| 180 | 52 | "Cine en casa" | 18 March 2025 | 6.8 |
| 181 | 53 | "Nominación inesperada" | 19 March 2025 | 6.9 |
| 182 | 54 | "Emiro retiene la salvación" | 20 March 2025 | 6.2 |
| 183 | 55 | "Temido castigo" | 21 March 2025 | 5.6 |
| 184 | 56 | "Un zoológico en la casa" | 22 March 2025 | 3.8 |
| 185 | 57 | "La tristeza de los 'Lavaplatos'" | 23 March 2025 | 5.5 |
Week 9
| 186 | 58 | "El revolcón de las habitaciones" | 24 March 2025 | 6.4 |
| 187 | 59 | "El presupuesto se desmorona" | 25 March 2025 | 6.8 |
| 188 | 60 | "Nominación en positivo" | 26 March 2025 | 6.0 |
| 189 | 61 | "Llegó Laura, la nueva participante" | 27 March 2025 | 7.3 |
| 190 | 62 | "Castigos y ruptura en fuego" | 28 March 2025 | 6.5 |
| 191 | 63 | "La entrada triunfal de Altafulla" | 29 March 2025 | 5.1 |
| 192 | 64 | "El Negro Salas dijo adiós" | 30 March 2025 | 7.1 |
Week 10
| 193 | 65 | "Mateo es el nuevo líder" | 31 March 2025 | 6.9 |
| 194 | 66 | "El cine cambió todo" | 1 April 2025 | 7.1 |
| 195 | 67 | "La placa está definida" | 2 April 2025 | 5.6 |
| 196 | 68 | "Robo de salvación inesperado" | 3 April 2025 | 6.4 |
| 197 | 69 | "Beneficio y castigo" | 4 April 2025 | 6.8 |
| 198 | 70 | "El Fulano que visitó la casa" | 5 April 2025 | 5.2 |
| 199 | 71 | "Llorada por partida doble" | 6 April 2025 | 7.1 |
Week 11
| 200 | 72 | "Melissa dijo hasta pronto" | 7 April 2025 | 7.0 |
| 201 | 73 | "Mane está en la casa" | 8 April 2025 | 7.0 |
| 202 | 74 | "Tensa nominación" | 9 April 2025 | 7.4 |
| 203 | 75 | "Mane conquistó la casa" | 10 April 2025 | 7.2 |
| 204 | 76 | "Mane dijo adiós" | 11 April 2025 | 7.2 |
| 205 | 77 | "Castigo bajo el agua" | 12 April 2025 | 5.9 |
| 206 | 78 | "Eliminación y verdades" | 13 April 2025 | 8.0 |
Week 12
| 207 | 79 | "Altafulla gana el liderazgo" | 14 April 2025 | 7.1 |
| 208 | 80 | "El cine del terror" | 15 April 2025 | 7.0 |
| 209 | 81 | "El cuarto Agua juega" | 16 April 2025 | 6.5 |
| 210 | 82 | "Hay fuego en la salvación" | 17 April 2025 | 5.4 |
| 211 | 83 | "Un hombre enamoradizo" | 18 April 2025 | 4.5 |
| 212 | 84 | "Una fiesta ¿blanca?" | 19 April 2025 | 5.1 |
| 213 | 85 | "Agua pierde un integrante" | 20 April 2025 | 7.4 |
Week 13
| 214 | 86 | "La Liendra se despidió" | 21 April 2025 | 6.6 |
| 215 | 87 | "Un congelado con nostalgia" | 22 April 2025 | 6.4 |
| 216 | 88 | "El poder de la manzana" | 23 April 2025 | 6.7 |
| 217 | 89 | "Poderoso regreso de La Jesuu" | 24 April 2025 | 6.8 |
| 218 | 90 | "Altafulla está de regreso" | 25 April 2025 | 7.1 |
| 219 | 91 | "Una exparticipante vuelve a casa" | 26 April 2025 | 5.3 |
| 220 | 92 | "El fuego se apaga" | 27 April 2025 | 7.6 |
Week 14
| 221 | 93 | "Emiro es el nuevo líder" | 28 April 2025 | 7.4 |
| 222 | 94 | "Cine de estrategia" | 29 April 2025 | 7.1 |
| 223 | 95 | "La casa arde" | 30 April 2025 | 8.0 |
| 224 | 96 | "Un invitado rompe la rutina" | 1 May 2025 | 6.8 |
| 225 | 97 | "Altafulla recibió una visita" | 2 May 2025 | 7.6 |
| 226 | 98 | "Más desacuerdos en fuego" | 3 May 2025 | 5.0 |
| 227 | 99 | "Se descompleta una pareja" | 4 May 2025 | 7.7 |
Week 15
| 228 | 100 | "Otra sanción para La Jesuu" | 5 May 2025 | 6.1 |
| 229 | 101 | "Presupuesto a punto de reventar" | 6 May 2025 | 6.2 |
| 230 | 102 | "Lealtades y traiciones" | 7 May 2025 | 6.4 |
| 231 | 103 | "Trapitos al sol" | 8 May 2025 | 6.4 |
| 232 | 104 | "Adiós a fuego" | 9 May 2025 | 6.5 |
| 233 | 105 | "Viaje al futuro" | 10 May 2025 | 4.2 |
| 234 | 106 | "Eliminación en negativo" | 11 May 2025 | 6.6 |
Week 16
| 235 | 107 | "La caja de pandora" | 12 May 2025 | 7.1 |
| 236 | 108 | "Primera nominación" | 13 May 2025 | 6.4 |
| 237 | 109 | "Yina se despide" | 14 May 2025 | 7.4 |
| 238 | 110 | "Camilo es el nuevo líder" | 15 May 2025 | 5.9 |
| 239 | 111 | "Emiro, nominado por el público" | 16 May 2025 | 6.1 |
| 240 | 112 | "Un artista deja un mensaje" | 17 May 2025 | 4.1 |
| 241 | 113 | "Una reñida eliminación" | 18 May 2025 | 6.2 |
Week 17
| 242 | 114 | "Cris y Yaya regresan" | 19 May 2025 | 6.9 |
| 243 | 115 | "El doble de likes" | 20 May 2025 | 5.9 |
| 244 | 116 | "Intensa nominación" | 21 May 2025 | 6.4 |
| 245 | 117 | "Un congelado especial" | 22 May 2025 | 7.2 |
| 246 | 118 | "Inesperada visita" | 23 May 2025 | 6.0 |
| 247 | 119 | "¡Fiesta pirata en la casa!" | 24 May 2025 | 5.0 |
| 248 | 120 | "La tristeza de Emiro" | 25 May 2025 | 6.9 |
Week 18
| 249 | 121 | "El último liderazgo" | 26 May 2025 | 6.6 |
| 250 | 122 | "Desaprovecharon los sobres" | 27 May 2025 | 5.5 |
| 251 | 123 | "La última placa de nominados" | 28 May 2025 | 6.2 |
| 252 | 124 | "Maravillosa sorpresa" | 29 May 2025 | 6.9 |
| 253 | 125 | "La Toxi salvada" | 30 May 2025 | 6.2 |
| 254 | 126 | "La graduación de los famosos" | 31 May 2025 | 3.8 |
| 255 | 127 | "Un famoso no llega al top 5" | 1 June 2025 | 6.0 |
Week 19
| 256 | 128 | "¡Jefes de campaña en casa!" | 2 June 2025 | 5.5 |
| 257 | 129 | "Último cine de la casa" | 3 June 2025 | 7.0 |
| 258 | 130 | "El gran debate" | 4 June 2025 | 6.7 |
| 259 | 131 | "Los cuatro finalistas" | 5 June 2025 | 6.6 |
| 260 | 132 | "Recuerdos de la casa" | 6 June 2025 | 6.6 |
| 261 | 133 | "Posicionamiento positivo" | 8 June 2025 | 6.1 |
| 262 | 134 | "La gran final" | 9 June 2025 | 9.9 |
