= El Tiempo Casa Editorial =

Colombian business conglomerate

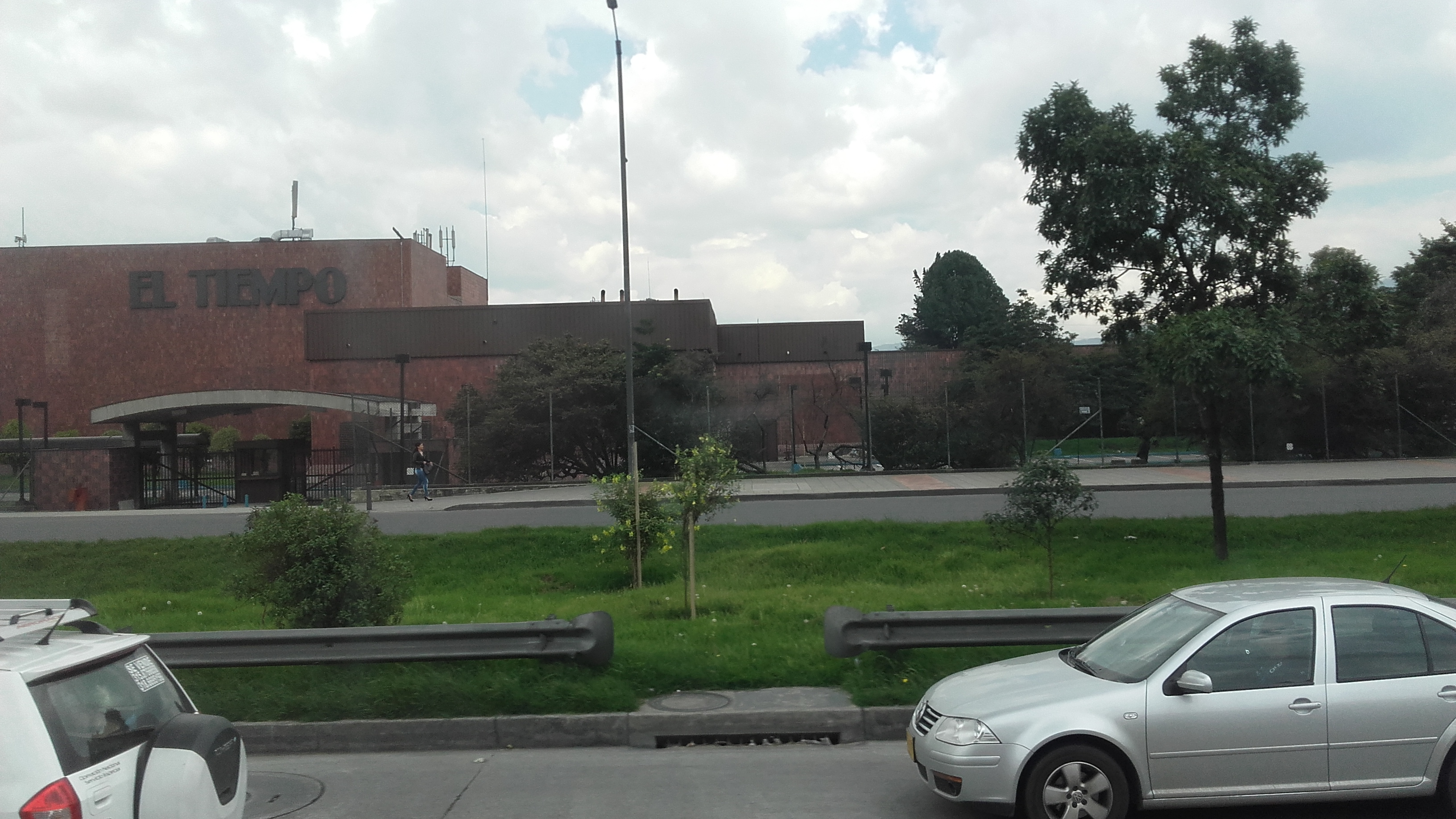
- El Tiempo building in Bogotá
- Trade name: El Tiempo Casa Editorial
- Type: Conglomerate
- Industry: Media conglomerate
- Founded: February 1, 1956; 70 years ago
- Founder: Eduardo Santos Montejo
- Headquarters: Cl. 22d #129, Bogotá, Colombia
- Brands: El Tiempo; Citytv
- Website: eltiempocasaeditorial.com

El Tiempo Casa Editorial is a Colombian media conglomerate and the publishing house that owns Colombia's main national daily newspaper, El Tiempo. It was founded by former president Eduardo Santos Montejo on February 1, 1956. Six months after, the dictatorship of General Gustavo Rojas Pinilla closed the newspaper. Santos Montejo formed the Publishing House to use the facilities and staff of El Tiempo in the production of other publications, preventing the disappearance of the company and the dismissal of its workers. The former president distributed the shares among the main members of the Santos family, Roberto García-Peña, Abdón Espinosa Valderrama, and several officials he trusted completely. The first publication of the new company was the newspaper Intermedio.

In March 2012, the economic group led by Luis Carlos Sarmiento Angulo acquired 88% of the shareholding, and two months later he carried out a negotiation to acquire all of the shares.

The ETCE conglomerate also manages the e-commerce portals: loencontraste.com, quebuenacompra.com, elempleo.com, metrocuadrado.com, carroya.com and one of the most important football portals in Colombia, Futbolred.com. Since its creation, ETCE has been the main shareholder of the local television channel Citytv, inaugurated on March 17, 1999, and of El Tiempo Televisión (Canal EL TIEMPO), created on October 5, 2010, which has rebroadcast Citytv's programming since 2019.

== Publications ==
- Portafolio: A leading economic publication in Colombia and one of the most important in Latin America, reaching users in three ways: a daily newspaper, a monthly magazine (subscribers only), and a digital version.
- Motor: Bi-weekly publication of information about automobiles. Its used vehicle price list is a reference for most car dealerships. (Second and last Wednesday of each month)
- Elenco: Entertainment and celebrity magazine. (Biweekly, Thursdays) had two phases, the first between 1979 and 1999 and the second between 2008 and 2015.
- Carrusel: Enfocada al entretenimiento y variedades. (Quincenal, jueves)
- Habitar: Housing information (Monthly, Saturday, and only for subscribers)
- Sunday Readings: Cultural supplement. (First Sunday of each month)
- Sunday to Sunday: A weekly magazine that provides in-depth analysis of the week's most relevant news. It began circulation after the cancellation of The New York Times Magazine. With the newspaper's redesign in 2010, it became the "Must Read" supplement, and in late 2017, with another redesign, it was renamed "In Depth"
- Boyacá 7 Días and Llano 7 Días: Regional newspapers with daily circulation (except Sundays and holidays), formerly in the format of regional weekly newspapers, in addition to this the weekly newspapers Tolima 7 Días (1992-2010), Café 7 Días (1998-2001) and Cundinamarca 7 Días (2008-2011) were also circulated, which ceased circulation to be included as a local section of the Diario EL TIEMPO of said regions; both Boyacá and Llano 7 Días are no longer part of the CEET business unit after being acquired from independent entrepreneurs; In the case of Boyacá 7 Días in April 2018 it was acquired by a group of Boyacá businessmen forming the Grupo Empresarial Boyacá 7 Días S.A.S which will be in charge of the financial, administrative and journalistic administration, despite this its layout and printing as well as its distribution and circulation will continue to have the support of the Casa Editorial El Tiempo; Similarly, Llano 7 Días, after its last edition under the administration of CEET on February 28, 2018,, the publication began circulating again on September 1 of the same year, under the administration of businessmen from the city of Villavicencio, led by the former mayor and former minister of agriculture Juan Guillermo Zuluaga.
- Bocas: Sunday magazine with reports and interviews with current personalities. (Second Sunday of each month)
- UN Newspaper: Publication of the National University of Colombia. (Every three weeks, Sunday, and only for subscribers).
- EL TIEMPO Zona: Weekly with community news, depending on the sector of Bogotá where the newspaper is sold (Weekly, Thursday).
- Don Juan: Monthly magazine with adult content.
- Metrocuadrado: Monthly magazine featuring new housing projects in Bogotá, Cali, and the coast. Also includes content on celebrity homes, decoration news, remodeling, and industry news. Monthly circulation
- Aló: A bi-weekly magazine founded in 1988 that focuses primarily on women's issues.
- Credencial: A purely cultural magazine distributed to subscribers and cardholders of Banco de Occidente.
- ADN Free newspaper of the capital city. It also publishes its own editions in the cities of Medellín, Cali, Barranquilla, Bucaramanga, and Ibagué.
- ENTER.CO Technology information (Monthly, for subscribers, and for sale to the public at a higher price than the subscription). The magazine is no longer part of CEET; it spun off and is now under Enter.co S.A.S., whose director is Guillermo Santos.

== Audiovisuals ==
- Citytv: A local open television channel that began broadcasting on March 19, 1999. It is aimed exclusively at the public of Bogotá and its metropolitan area, but has national coverage through the different subscription television systems, and via the web.

== See also ==
- El Tiempo
- Santos family
