= Sara Uribe =

Colombian model and TV host

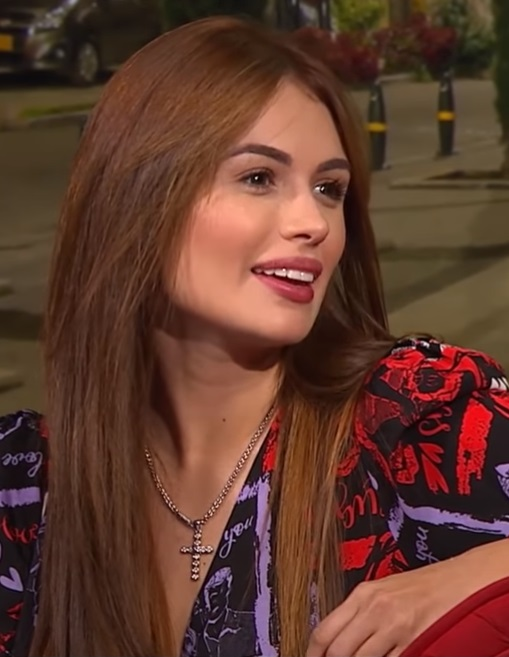
- Uribe in 2019
- Born: November 28, 1990 (age 35); Andes, Antioquia, Colombia
- Occupations: Model; TV host
- Years active: 2009–present
- Partner: Freddy Guarín (2018-2020)
- Children: 1

Sara Uribe Cadavid (born November 28, 1990) is a Colombian model and TV host. She rose to fame in 2012, being one of the winners of the second season of Colombian reality TV show Protagonistas de Nuestra Tele on RCN.

== Early life ==
Uribe was born in Andes, Antioquia. Her mother worked selling arepas while her father worked harvesting coffee. They lived in the municipality of Andes until Uribe was about 3 years old and then moved to Medellín as her parents fell apart. While in Medellín, she lived in her grandmother's house until problems emerged within the family.

As a child, she faced many struggles, one of the most prominent being not having a secure income for her family so she started working from a very young age selling candies at school and getting part-time jobs such as selling clothes. At 14, she started modeling for various agencies doing advertising for several well-known trade-marks in Colombia.

== Career ==
Finishing high school she was offered a college scholarship from her high school's principal, allowing her to pursue the studies she wanted. She decided to pursue a career in Business Administration. Soon after, she left it to study Social Communication. As part of the final terms of her studies she worked for Teleantioquia as a TV host for shows such as Venga a mi pueblo Antioqueño in 2009 and for Cosmovisión in the show Modelos Televisión. She also participated in the beauty contest Miss Gaming Colombia in 2012, ending up winning the title.

In 2012, Uribe was cast as one of the contestants of the reality TV Show Protagonistas de Nuestra Tele on RCN being the winner. This show boosted her career, allowing her to work as a host for several TV shows mainly on RCN. Nonetheless, she has worked in different TV networks such as Canal 1 in the show Lo sé todo in 2017 and Caracol TV in La Kalle and La vuelta al mundo en 80 risas, the latter being in 2019.

== Filmography ==
=== Television ===
Year	Title	Role	Notes
2009-2010	Venga a mi pueblo Antioqueño	Herself	Co-host
2012	Protagonistas de Nuestra Tele	Herself	Contestant; Winner
2013-2014	Estilo RCN	Herself	Host
2014-2015	El Lavadero	Herself	Co-host
2015-2016	En Exclusiva	Herself	Host
2017-2018	La Kalle	Herself	Co-host
2017-2018	Lo sé todo	Herself	Co-host
2019	La vuelta al mundo en 80 risas	Herlself	Co-host
2026	La casa de los famosos Colombia	Herself	Contestant

== Awards and nominations ==
Year	Association	Category	Nominated work	Result
2016	TVyNovelas Awards Colombia	TVyNovelas Award for Best TV Host	Herself	Nominated
