= Citytv (Colombia) =

Television channel in Bogotá, Colombia

- Logo used since 2025
- Type: Digital terrestrial television
- Country: Colombia
- Broadcast area: Bogotá and Cundinamarca; Nationwide (cable and satellite)
- Affiliates: Univision
- Headquarters: Bogotá

Programming
- Language: Spanish
- Picture format: 1080i HDTV (rescaled to 16:9 480i for the channel's standard resolution signal)

Ownership
- Owner: El Tiempo Casa Editorial (brand licensed by Rogers Media)
- Key people: Luis Carlos Sarmiento Angulo; Luis Carlos Sarmiento Gutiérrez (CEO)

History
- Launched: March 19, 1999; 27 years ago
- Founder: Juan Lozano Ramírez

Links
- Website: citytv.eltiempo.com/noticias

Availability

Terrestrial
- Analog UHF: Channel 21
- Digital UHF: Channel 27.1

Citytv (Spanish pronunciation: [sˈɪti tˌeˈβe]) is a Colombian free-to-air television channel, owned by El Tiempo Casa Editorial (ETCE), owner of the newspaper of the same name. ETCE licensed the Citytv from CHUM Limited. It began broadcasting on March 19, 1999 on UHF channel 21 in Bogotá. The channel is a member of Asociación Colombiana de Medios de Comunicación (ASOMEDIOS). It broadcasts for the metropolitan area of Bogotá and the department of Cundinamarca.

== History ==
It began broadcasting on March 19, 1999, on UHF channel 21 in Bogotá.

Some programs from the original Citytv, such as MuchMusic and Electric Circus (whose Colombian versions are Mucha Música and Circo Eléctrico), were adapted for local audiences. While others, such as Fashion TV and SeXTV, were dubbed until 2007. Also, following the style of the original Citytv, on newscasts such as CityNoticias and the morning show Arriba Bogotá, the anchors read the news standing up, just as they do at the parent company of Toronto.

In 1999, with the channel's launch, "Sin Cédula" (Without a Cédula) stood out, broadcast Monday through Friday from 4:30 to 5:00 p.m. This program stood out for highlighting all the schools located in the Bogotá capital. It also aired cartoons such as Oggy and the Cockroaches and Space Goofs.

After eight years of broadcasting, in 2007, "Sin Cédula" was replaced by "Zonalocha," a youth-oriented program similar to its predecessor. Anime series were also incorporated into the channel's programming schedule during this time slot. Additionally, blocks such as "Nikneim" and "El Toque" were created, aimed at a young adult audience. Until then, Citytv had been broadcasting children's programs for Bogotá.

In 2009, "Cool's Cool" appeared, a program dedicated solely to school activities throughout the city. In 2011, this program was replaced by "Nick City," featuring animations and live action from the American channel Nickelodeon, in addition to highlighting school and university activities. The "Nick City" segment ended in 2016.

In 2013, Citytv launched "Intervención Colombia" in partnership with A&E.

== Website ==
Citytv.com.co
- Website type: Video sharing
- Available in: Spanish
- Dissolved: September 2017; 9 years ago
- Owner: Casa Editorial El Tiempo
- Website: citytv.com.co (archived)
- Launched: 2009; 17 years ago
- Current status: Defunct; now redirects to citytv.eltiempo.com
- Content license: Copyrighted and Creative Commons

Citytv.com.co launched in 2009 as a Colombian video sharing website. The website was created by El Tiempo Publishing Company (Casa Editorial El Tiempo) in order to compete with other popular video sharing websites such as YouTube and Metacafe with the difference being that it targets a Colombian audience. By August 2009, the vast majority of videos in the website came from Citytv's television programming. Users were able to upload their own videos upon registration or by accessing via Facebook Connect. The website's terms of service warned that videos with improper material such as pornography or defamation were prohibited and that all videos were screened prior to publishing. In September 2017, the video sharing features were removed and the website shifted to a more general website for Citytv.

== Programming ==
The channel's programming has been notable for its news, entertainment programs, journalistic programs, youth programs, animated series, documentaries, and special events.

=== News system ===
Citytv offers news programs, Monday through Friday mornings such as Arriba Bogotá, and Monday through Sunday afternoons and evenings such as CityNoticias.
