= Intermedio (Colombian newspaper) =

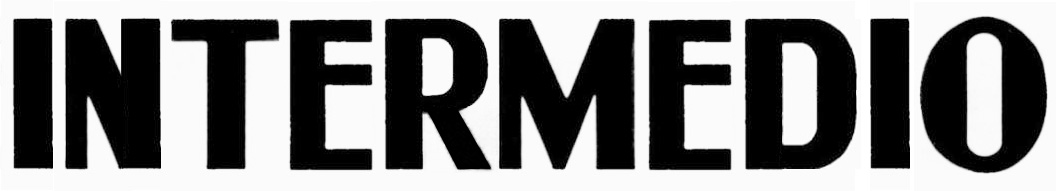

- Front page of the first edition of "Intermedio"; February 21, 1956
- Type: Daily newspaper
- Format: Broadsheet
- Founder: Eduardo Santos
- Publisher: Casa Editorial El Tiempo
- Editor-in-chief: Enrique Santos Montejo
- Founded: February 21, 1956
- Ceased publication: June 7, 1957
- Political alignment: Liberalism
- Language: Spanish
- Headquarters: Bogotá, D.C., Colombia

Intermedio (English: Interlude) was a Colombian newspaper issued as a replacement for El Tiempo, when it was closed down during the dictatorship of General Gustavo Rojas Pinilla, in the early morning of August 4, 1955. The night before, the newspaper building was occupied by government troops that prevented the publication of a new edition. Intermedio was the first publication of the Casa Editorial El Tiempo, a publishing company founded by former President Eduardo Santos in order to use printing equipment to make different kind of printed products.

== Historical background ==
On June 13, 1953 Lieutenant General Gustavo Rojas Pinilla assumed the presidency of Colombia in a coup d'état from Laureano Gómez, as he was retiring from his office due to health problems and had delegated his functions to the acting president, Roberto Urdaneta Arbeláez. Press censorship had been imposed during the Mariano Ospina Pérez administration, in 1949, and intensified with his successors Gómez and Urdaneta. Under Rojas, the situation did not change. The event that triggered the closure of El Tiempo was the death of journalist Emilio Correa Uribe, editor of El Diario in Pereira, and his son Carlos Correa. The official version claimed that they had died in a traffic accident, but all available information led to conclude that both of them had been killed by a group of armed conservative assassins known as "Los Pájaros" (English: "The Birds"). President Rojas Pinilla, during his trip to Ecuador, accused the Colombian press of lying about it. Roberto Garcia-Peña, editor-in-chief of El Tiempo, sent a telegram to his colleague of El Comercio in Quito, setting out his position and emphasizing that the deaths had been murder and not due to a simple car crash.

The government wanted to force El Tiempo to print on the front page for thirty days, a message retracting on its statements and apologizing to the President for having "offending him unfairly", but without saying that it was a rectification ordered by the regime. The intended text to be published was as it follows:

"We express sincere and public excuses to the President of Colombia on behalf of our newspaper and our editor-in-chief, Roberto García-Peña, and we confess that we committed an unfair offense, since what he said at the press conference held in the city of Quito is rigorously true".

Garcia-Peña roundly refused to publish that retracting message because his newspaper had nothing to beg for forgiveness. The dictatorship issued Act 036, and officially, in the early morning of August 4, 1955, El Tiempo was closed down. That same day, Minister of Government Lucio Pabón Núñez, read the official press release on Radio Nacional de Colombia (the Colombian government radio station) A few weeks later, Rojas Pinilla himself during a speech boasted of having destroyed a mass media that he regarded as his enemy and a sort of super-state, saying that "Since August 4, 1955, the country has been notified that the Head of State of Colombia is in the President's Palace and not in the publishing department of any newspaper".

== Foundation of Intermedio ==
In order not to leave his employees without a job and avoid bankruptcy, Eduardo Santos created the "Casa Editorial El Tiempo" by redistributing shares among some members of the Santos family, Roberto García-Peña, Abdón Espinosa Valderrama, and other people of his inner circle of friends and collaborators. After having fulfilled the legal requirements, Intermedio was first published on February 21, 1956. The editor in charge was Enrique Santos Montejo "Calibán", brother of Eduardo Santos.

Cartoons by "Chapete". LEFT. The old actor says: "Thank you very much, ladies and gentlemen. And now, some moments of Interlude" (First edition of Intermedio. February 21, 1956). RIGHT. After the falling of the dictatorship, the same old actor says: "As we were saying yesterday..." (Return of El Tiempo. June 8, 1957).

Intermedio used the same typeface in its masthead as used by El Tiempo, the layout was identical, and the sections and columns were the same ones that usually appeared in El Tiempo. Even street sellers of newspapers kept announcing it as El Tiempo, although that was not its name. What is more, the name of Intermedio was purposely chosen to mean that the situation was something temporary, short-lived, like the interlude of a theater play, and that the dictatorship of Rojas, sooner rather than later was going to fall. To emphasize that idea, the front page of the first edition included a cartoon by Hernando Turriago "Chapete", in which a very old actor standing on stage, with an hourglass and a scythe in his hands, greets the spectators by saying: "Thank you very much, ladies and gentlemen. And now, some moments of Interlude". However, in that first edition of twenty four pages, Intermedio reluctantly had to publish a press release ordered by the regime in which ratified that the death of the Correas (what triggered the closure of El Tiempo), had been caused by an accident.

The relationship between the government and the newspaper was ambivalent. On the one hand, in April 1956, Rojas suggested that the Santos brothers reopen El Tiempo, but Eduardo Santos rejected the proposal and assured him that his newspaper would not return as long as the dictatorship existed. From then on, censorship became a little more flexible, but on the other hand, the import of paper and other supplies needed for printing were blocked by bureaucratic paperwork.

== Falling of the dictatorship, end of Intermedio and return of El Tiempo ==
While Rojas's de facto regime was collapsing, two deadly enemies of previous decades, the leaders of Liberal and Conservative parties, Alberto Lleras Camargo and Laureano Gómez, respectively, were creating a strategy to overthrow the dictatorship. Thus, by the Agreement of Benidorm, on July 24, 1956, and the "Agreement of March" (from 1957), they set the basis of what would later be known as the National Front, which consisted of the democratic alternation in the Presidency of the two traditional parties and the equal distribution of bureaucratic offices.

Front page of "Intermedio", giving the news on the falling of Rojas Pinilla's dictatorship, on May 10, 1957

The political situation reached a critical point when a national strike was organized by most sectors of the Colombian society on May 5, 1957. Mass media, banking, industry, commerce, transport and other groups of the economy ceased their activities. Rojas Pinilla announced his resignation, designated as a replacement a Military Junta and escaped from the country on May 10, 1957. That same day Intermedio and its colleague El Independiente (issued as a substitute of El Espectador) released extraordinary editions, with the breaking news on the end of the dictatorship.

Thousands of people filled up the streets of Colombia to celebrate the falling of the dictator. In Bogotá, a group of them went to the building of El Tiempo. The most enthusiastic ones climbed up the balconies to the fourth floor and tore off the Intermedio banner which had temporary covered the El Tiempo sign. In the May 11 edition, Intermedio announced that El Tiempo would circulate again when Eduardo Santos returned from his exile in France and there would be proper conditions to restart issuing. Those proper conditions were finally given by the Resolution 0199 of June 4, 1957, which rescinded the closure order against El Tiempo proclaimed in August 1955.

The last edition of Intermedio (number 458) was issued on June 7, 1957. This was the final paragraph of the editorial column:

"We are not writing a farewell. Tomorrow, we will resume the battle from another trench, now protected by more benevolent signs. We have had a prolific interval, never static, permanently illuminated by a deep faith in the invincible spiritual values of our homeland. We are going forward, towards that new republic reborn from chaos, pain and hopeless. The interlude has ended. The front curtain will rise".

As a tribute, the next day on June 8, 1957, when El Tiempo restarted, a new cartoon of "Chapete" was published on the front page. It was the sequel to the one published in the first number of Intermedio. Now it showed the same old actor standing on stage, with an hourglass and a scythe in his hands and a pair of broken chains lying down on the floor. The old man greets the spectators with a quote from Fray Luis de León: "As we were saying yesterday ..."

Besides, "Caliban" summarized in his column "Danza de las Horas", which had been the performance of Intermedio through the difficult conditions which it had to deal with, and once finished its mission, welcomed the return of El Tiempo:

"Intermedio comes to an end. And, as in the ancient dramas, it is just pending for the actors to ask the people for an applause, which is the only reward that we expect. And El Tiempo goes on, although, in fact, it never stopped. The street sellers boys refused to ratify the closure of El Tiempo, and with that old battle name they announced it in avenues and squares. In the printing workshops, the publishing department and the management – with very few exceptions – the same personnel of El Tiempo worked always with bravery and without selfishness. The ideals were not modified even in one line. The compass always marked the same north."
