= El Tiempo (Colombia) =

Colombian newspaper

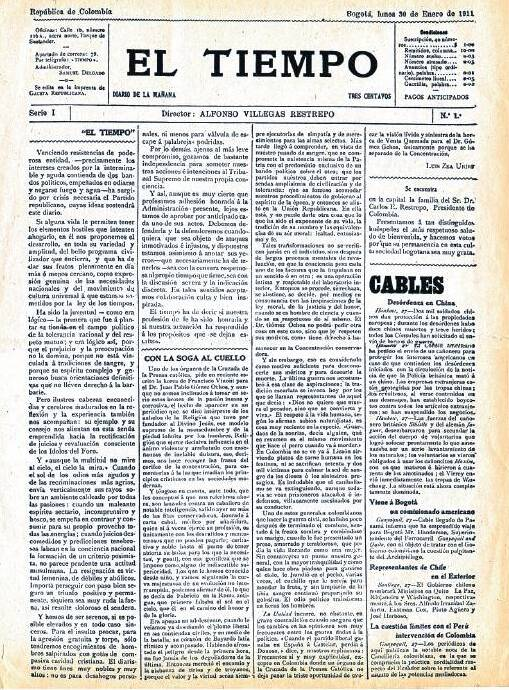
- Type: Daily newspaper
- Format: Broadsheet
- Owner: Luis Carlos Sarmiento Angulo
- Founder: Alfonso Villegas Restrepo
- Publisher: Casa Editorial El Tiempo S.A.
- Editor-in-chief: Andrés Mompotes
- Founded: 30 January 1911
- Political alignment: Centrism
- Language: Spanish
- Headquarters: Cl. 22d #129, Bogotá, D.C., Colombia
- Circulation: 1,137,483 Daily readers 1,921,571 Sunday readers (2012)
- ISSN: 0121-9987
- OCLC number: 28894254
- Website: www.eltiempo.com

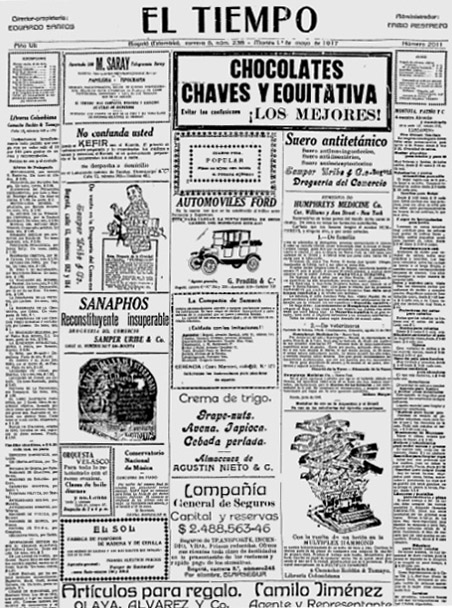
First Edition of El Tiempo using its now traditional logo, published on May 1, 1917. The first edition of the newspaper was published 6 years before, in 1911.

El Tiempo (English: "Time" or "The Times") is a Colombian newspaper founded on January 30, 1911, by Alfonso Villegas Restrepo. It is currently the newspaper with the largest circulation in Colombia and for seven years was practically the only one with national circulation, due to the crisis of its main competitor, El Espectador, which became a weekly in 2001 but returned to daily publication in 2008. El Tiempo is considered a leading newspaper in Colombia. Its owner is the economic group led by the Colombian businessman Luis Carlos Sarmiento Angulo, who bought its share from the Planeta Group of Spain, in March 2012. Two months later, it was revealed that Sarmiento Angulo also acquired the shares of the minority shareholders: Abdón Espinosa Valderrama and the members of the Santos family. The newspaper is the foundation of the media conglomerate known as El Tiempo Casa Editorial (ETCE).

According to the 2015 General Media Study, it had 3,515,548 readers across all its platforms, with an average of 969,713 readers of the print edition, from Monday to Saturday. and 1 695 107 of the Sunday edition.

== History ==
The newspaper was founded on January 30, 1911, by Alfonso Villegas Restrepo, starting with 300 four-page copies, in octavo format. Ideologically, it aligned itself with the Republican Union (Colombia), the coalition that had brought then-President Carlos E. Restrepo to power.

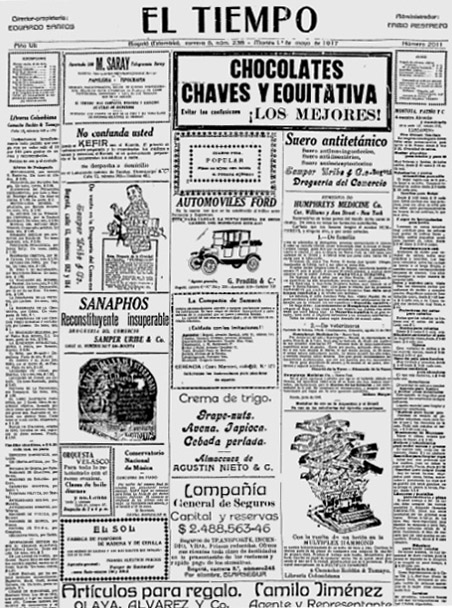
First edition of El Tiempo with its traditional logo, published on May 1, 1917.

=== Beginnings ===
Its first offices were located in a house within Santander Park. It did not have its own printing equipment, so the newspaper was printed on the presses of the "Gaceta Republicana". A few months later, in July 1911, it moved to another building in the same park, on the side where the Gold Museum is currently located. There, it could print on its own machinery, but the page typesetting was still done manually, letter by letter, with lead type. A third move took place in March 1912, to 14th Street, near Florián Street, an area where the Bogotá Stock Exchange operated until the end of the 20th century. The new building housed the newspaper's offices, the printing workshops, and, on the upper floor, the residence of the Villegas Restrepo family.

Following the death of Carlota Restrepo de Villegas, the founder's mother, he temporarily stepped down from managing the newspaper, being replaced by Tomás Rueda Vargas. By June 1913, given the evident failure of the Republican Union and the fact that the newspaper was heavily indebted, Villegas chose to retire from politics and journalism. He sold the company to Eduardo Santos Montejo, a young official at the Ministry of Foreign Affairs, who had been a columnist for the publication since its second edition. The value of the negotiation was five thousand pesos, which Santos paid with money from a bank loan. From issue 686, July 10, 1913, Eduardo Santos was listed as the sole director and owner of El Tiempo. Four years later, Santos married Lorenza Villegas, sister of the newspaper's founder.

To resolve the economic chaos left by his predecessor, Santos appointed Fabio Restrepo as manager. He stabilized the newspaper's finances, paid off its debts, and managed the newspaper for the next 36 years. In the editorial section, Enrique Santos Montejo "Calibán," brother of Eduardo Santos and founder of La Linterna in Tunja, joined the editorial pages. He began publishing his column "Dance of the Hours" on August 20, 1915, which he wrote until his death in September 1971. The arrival of Eduardo Santos to the direction of El Tiempo meant his gradual distancing from republicanism. By 1921, the newspaper proclaimed its total adherence to the ideology of the Liberal Party, which at that time was a minority in Congress and opposed to the conservatism, a group that had been hegemonically in power since 1886.

Advances in technology, format, design, and information resources continued to emerge. In 1915, it began publishing information from the Reuters news agency. Three years later, it also affiliated with the Associated Press. On May 1, 1917, the masthead with the newspaper's traditional logo was published for the first time, which, with minor variations, remains to this day. By 1918, the Linotype typesetting system was incorporated, and from July 25, 1919, El Tiempo began to be printed on a duplex rotary press. By 1920, the publication already had a circulation of more than ten thousand eight-page copies. In 1926, a second duplex press was acquired, which allowed for the printing of fifteen thousand 24-page newspapers per hour. The airline Scadta, now Avianca, first transported the edition of El Tiempo to Barranquilla by plane in 1928.

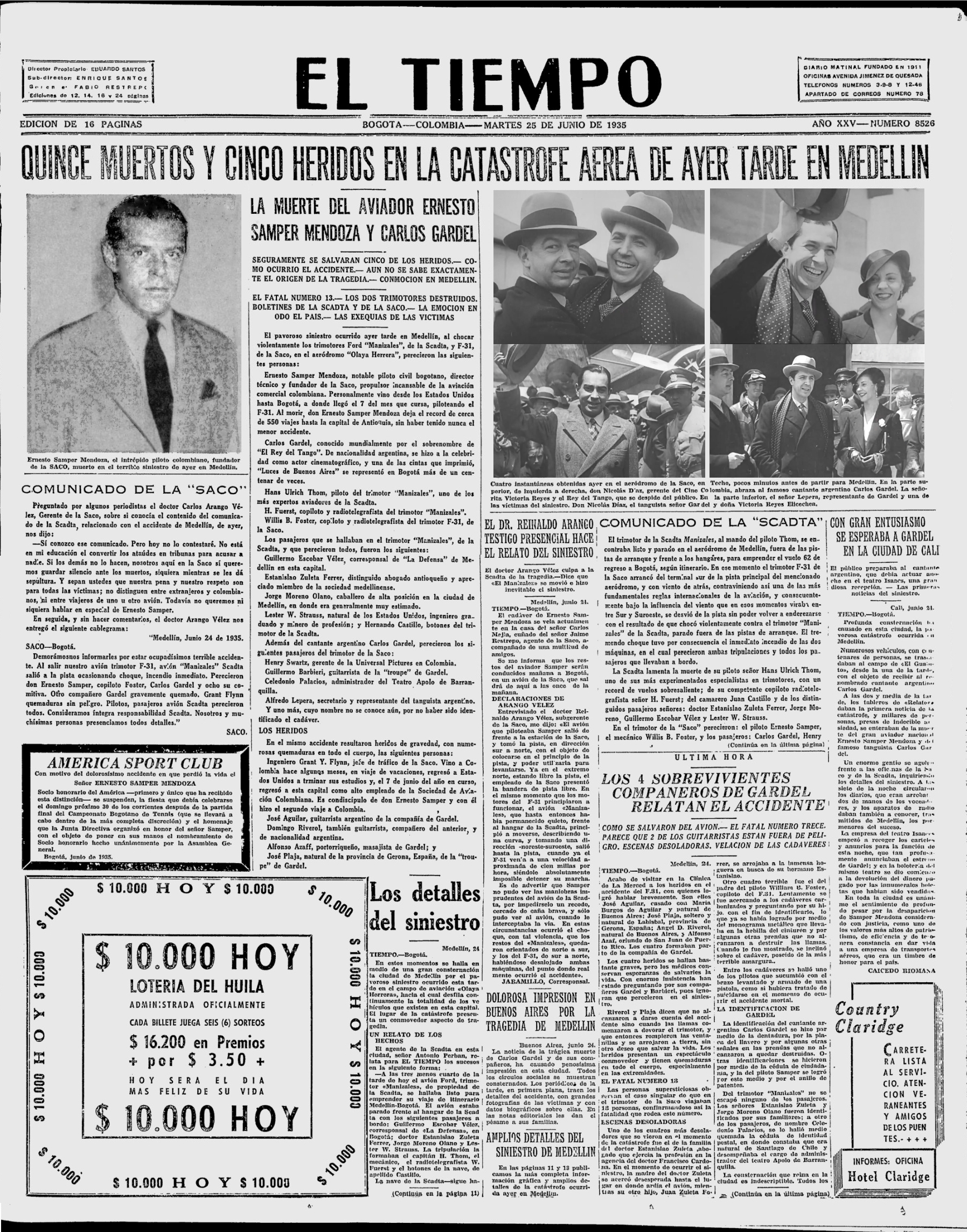
Front page of El Tiempo with the news of the death of the singer Carlos Gardel, published on June 25, 1935.

=== From the Opposition to the Government ===
The disrepute of conservatism—which, after 44 consecutive years in power, went into the elections divided into two factions—and the social climate heated by violent events such as the Banana Massacre, and the Great Depression (the global economic crisis of 1929) led to the victory of the liberal candidate Enrique Olaya Herrera in 1930. One of the key factors for the victory was the influence that El Tiempo had both in the selection of the candidate and in the editorial campaign it carried out in his favor, especially considering that Olaya's debate manager was Eduardo Santos. And it was just the first step. During the four terms of the Liberal Republic (Colombia), the newspaper consolidated itself as the most powerful media outlet in shaping public opinion, not only within liberalism but also among the entire national ruling class.

During the four-year terms of Olaya Herrera and Alfonso López Pumarejo, and taking advantage of the enormous prestige he had gained with the newspaper in his work consolidating liberalism in power, Santos held several public offices, such as Minister of Foreign Affairs, Colombian Ambassador to the League of Nations, Minister Plenipotentiary to Europe, Governor of Santander, Deputy to the Cundinamarca Assembly, Representative to the Chamber, and President of the Senate. He then launched his presidential candidacy for the 1938–1942 term, leaving the direction of El Tiempo to Germán Arciniegas on February 27, 1937. Arciniegas], who in turn was replaced by Roberto García-Peña "Ayax", on April 1, 1939. Once his term as President of the Republic ended, Eduardo Santos continued to appear in the newspaper's organizational chart until his death as "Director-Owner".

=== From Government to Opposition ===
For the 1946 presidential elections, the Liberal Party went to the polls divided into two factions: the official faction, with Gabriel Turbay, the candidate supported by the party director (who was Eduardo Santos himself) and therefore had the backing of El Tiempo newspaper, and the dissident sector, led by Jorge Eliécer Gaitán. Mariano Ospina Pérez, the sole Conservative candidate, won the elections, and during his term, the partisan violence between Liberals and Conservatives fully developed, the most serious event of which was the assassination of Gaitán, an event popularly known as the Bogotazo, on April 9, 1948. Due to the serious public order incidents that took place in the capital, El Tiempo, like its colleague El Espectador, ceased publication for three days. That same year, the Goss rotary press was put into operation, which allowed the printing of fifteen thousand 48-page copies per hour.

The political situation continued to worsen. Ospina closed Congress, decreed a state of siege, and imposed censorship. On September 6, 1952, the offices of El Tiempo and El Espectador, the headquarters of the Liberal Party, and the residences of Alfonso López Pumarejo and Carlos Lleras Restrepo were looted and set on fire by a mob. of conservatives attending the funeral of police officers murdered in Tolima. Its circulation had to be suspended for 48 hours, and for twelve days it was published in tabloid format, printed on borrowed equipment. People called this newspaper "El Tiempito" (Little Time) because of its small size.

=== Closure of El Tiempo and appearance of Intermedio ===
The press censorship, established by Ospina Pérez, and which had continued during the governments of Laureano Gómez and Roberto Urdaneta Arbeláez, intensified during the dictatorship of General Gustavo Rojas Pinilla. On the night of August 3, 1955, the facilities of El Tiempo were militarized and the newspaper was shut down. The pretext for the closure was a telegram that the newspaper's director, Roberto García-Peña sent a series of corrections and clarifications to Jorge Mantilla, his counterpart at El Comercio (Ecuador) in Quito, regarding a statement Rojas Pinilla had made during his visit to Ecuador, in which he attacked the Colombian liberal press, calling it liars for having claimed that some people killed in a traffic accident had actually been murdered by a group of conservative thugs called «Los pájaros» (the deceased were Emilio Correa Uribe, director of «El Diario», of Pereira, and his son).

The regime ordered El Tiempo to publish a front-page apology to the President of the Republic for "unjustly offending" the government he led, since the official version, and therefore the only one permitted, was that of an accident. When El Tiempo refused to apologize, Decree 036 of August 4, 1955, was enacted, which determined the indefinite suspension of its publications. Weeks later, Rojas boasted in a speech of having been able to destroy a media outlet he considered a superstate, a parallel government, and declared that "as of August 4, 1955, the country has been notified that the Head of State is in the presidential palace and not in the newsroom of any newspaper." name="cincuentenariobis"/>

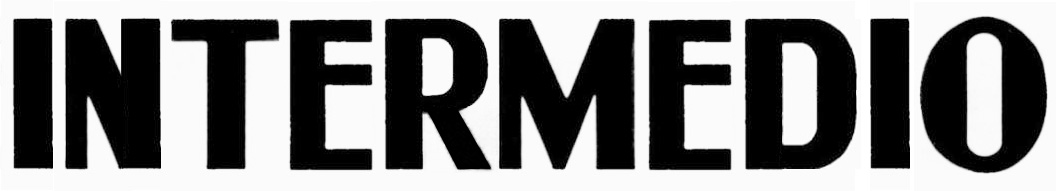
Logo of "Intermedio", which circulated in place of El Tiempo, between February 21, 1956 and June 7, 1957.

Seeing that the closure of the newspaper meant, on the one hand, an enormous economic loss, and on the other, leaving almost a thousand employees without work, Eduardo Santos decided to found the El Tiempo Publishing House, distributing part of the shares he owned with his wife among the Santos family group, Roberto García-Peña and several long-standing senior officials of the newspaper. After processing the necessary permits, it went out into the streets Intermedio, on February 21, 1956, under the direction of Enrique Santos "Caliban." The logo on the masthead of the new newspaper used the same font as El Tiempo, and even the newsboys announced it as El Tiempo. The name "Intermedio" was chosen deliberately, making a veiled allusion to the fact that this situation was merely a brief pause, like an intermission in a play, and that the dictatorial regime was not going to last long. From dictator Rojas Pinilla to imprisoned mayor Samuel Moreno The caricature of "Chapete" on the cover of the first edition made this clear. An actor on stage greeted the audience, saying, "Respected audience, thank you very much. And now, a few moments of Intermedio." In April 1956, eight months after the closure, Rojas offered the Santos brothers the option of resuming publication of El Tiempo, but they refused. Although censorship of Intermedio continued, it was somewhat permissive from then on.

On May 10, 1957, after a nationwide civic strike that lasted several days, Gustavo Rojas Pinilla resigned from the presidency, appointed a five-member military junta, and left the country. Demonstrations of jubilation over the fall of the dictatorship erupted spontaneously in Colombian cities. A group of citizens gathered in front of the El Tiempo building; several of them climbed onto the balconies and tore down the "Intermedio" sign that obscured the name of the traditional newspaper. Hours later, it was announced that El Tiempo would reappear as soon as Eduardo Santos returned to Colombia (he was in exile in France) and the conditions were right to resume publication. Resolution 0199 of June 4, 1957, overturned the closure order of the newspaper. "Intermedio" said goodbye to its readers on June 7, closing its editorial in this way: "It is not a farewell we are writing. Tomorrow we will resume the battle from another trench and under more favorable signs (...) We are moving forward, toward that new republic reborn from chaos, pain, and despair. The intermission has ended." The curtain is about to rise.» In turn, in the «Dance of the Hours», «Caliban» thanked the public for their support of the short-lived newspaper and indicated the continuation of his work, again from El Tiempo, saying: «»Thus Intermedio disappears from the stage. And as in the old dramas, all that remains for us actors is to ask the people for applause, which is the only reward we aspire to. And El Tiempo continues its march...»»

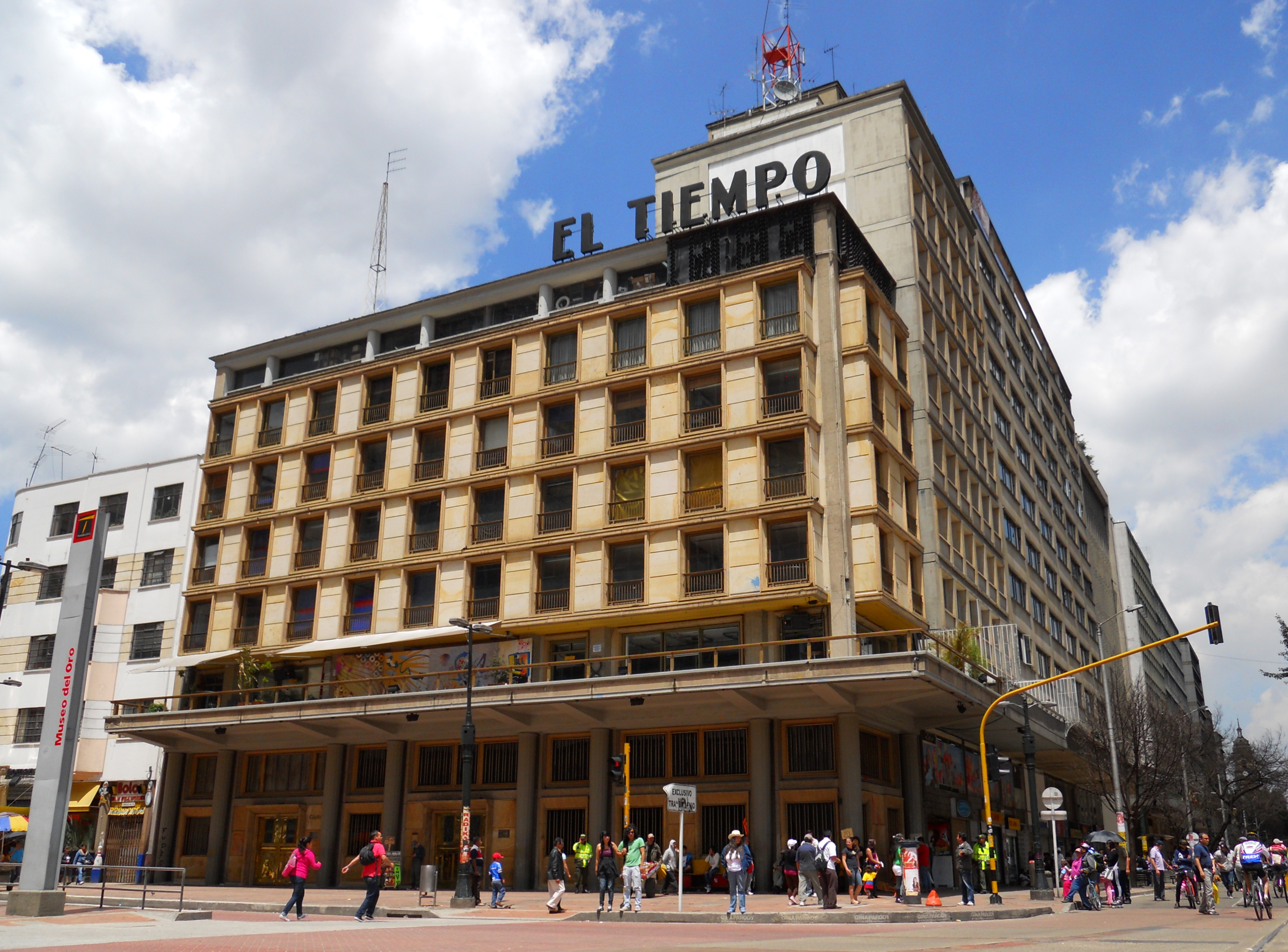
El Tiempo Building located on Avenida Jiménez with Carrera Séptima, in Bogotá. (Currently, Headquarters of the University of Rosario).

=== Reappearance and adherence to the National Front ===
El Tiempo returned on June 8, 1957, and as a continuation of the "Chapete" cartoon in the first edition of "Intermedio," this time it presented on its front page the image of an old man (time) who, on a stage where there are broken chains, addresses the public with the famous phrase of Fray Luis de León: "As we were saying yesterday..." The dictatorship had fallen not only due to popular pressure but also from the ruling class that had remained on the sidelines of power. Months earlier, Alberto Lleras Camargo, representing the Colombian Liberal Party, and Laureano Gómez, representing the Colombian Conservative Party, had held meetings abroad that led to the Benidorm Pact and the Sitges Pact. These agreements established the bipartisan pact historically known as the National Front, which consisted of alternating the Presidency of the Republic for the next four terms and distributing public offices equally between the two parties.

In this new landscape of peaceful coexistence between liberals and conservatives, the newspaper showed its full support for the National Front in two full-page headlines and in its respective editorials, and changed the motto that accompanied it during the days of violence, censorship and dictatorship, which read "El Tiempo is a liberal newspaper at the service of the homeland and justice, which fights for the "Democratic principles that the Charter of Human Rights enshrines as the right of free peoples, must be a secure reality for all Colombians," by "El Tiempo is at the service of the ideals of democratic faith and patriotic solidarity that the National Front advocates, and under whose protection, the principles enshrined in the Charter of Human Rights, as the right of free peoples, must be a constant reality for all Colombians." According to some experts, El Tiempo, in order to defend the bipartisan agreement, directly attacked, through its headlines, any other political tendency that did not fit into the red and blue of the National Front, as happened during the 1962 election campaign.

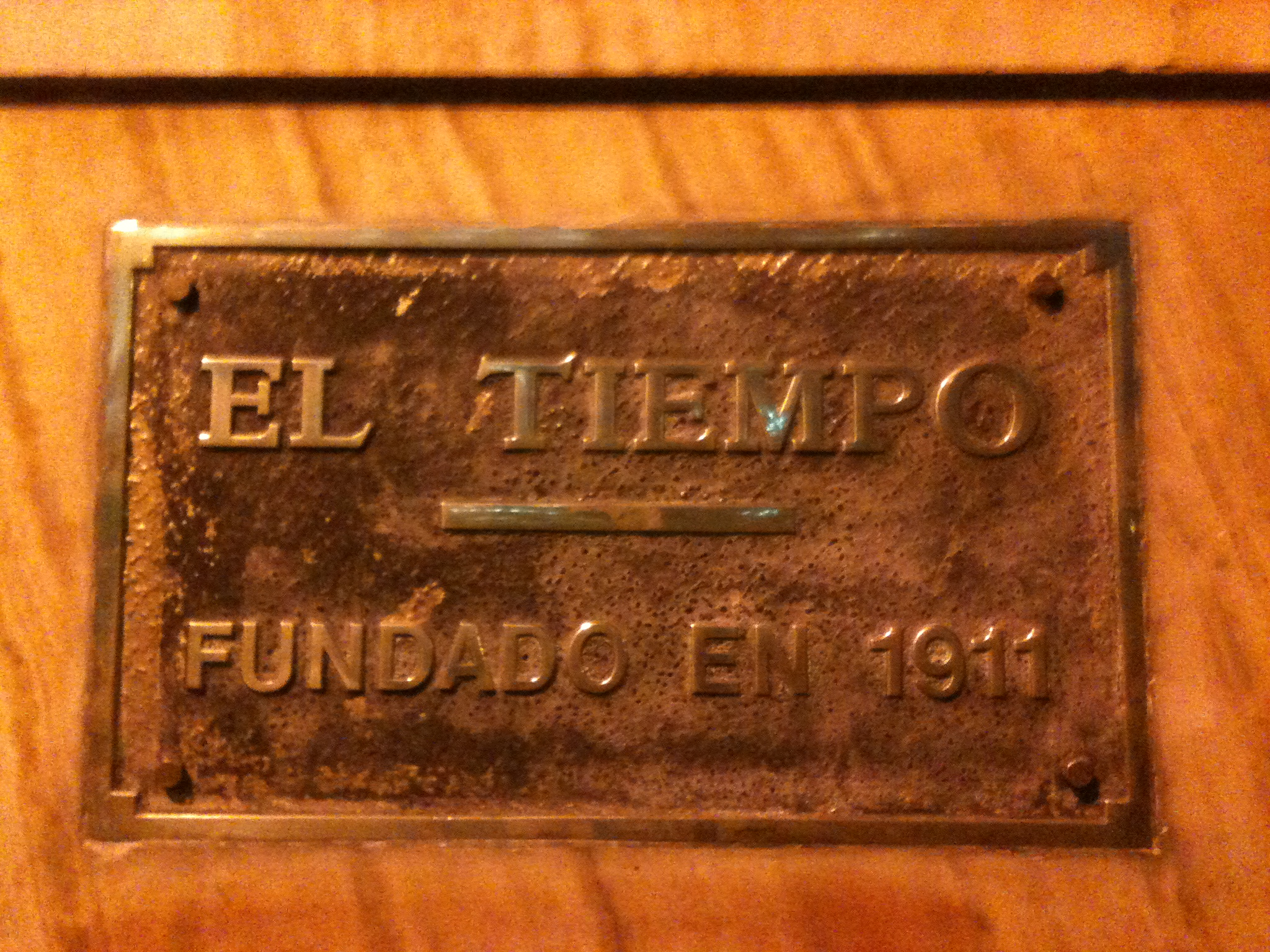
Commemorative plaque marking the founding of the newspaper in the El Tiempo Building.

To mark the 50th anniversary of the newspaper's founding, on January 30, 1961, the El Tiempo Building on Avenida Jiménez and Carrera Séptima was officially inaugurated, and the Goss Headliner rotary press, with a capacity to print 50,000 newspapers per hour, was put into operation. Color also arrived on the pages of the newspaper during this decade. Although not new, special editions became famous in the 1960s, appearing on the streets faster than in previous eras thanks to technological advances, as was the case with the assassination of John F. Kennedy and the assassination of Robert F. Kennedy. Pope Paul VI's visit to Colombia and Apollo 11's arrival on the Moon]. On January 16 1972, El Tiempo debuted a new layout and typographic style, which, with minor adjustments, remained in use until March 1988.

The first part of the 1970s brought with it the loss of the two Santos brothers. Enrique Santos Montejo, known as Caliban, died on September 28, 1971, just four days after writing his last "Dance of the Hours," and former president Eduardo Santos Montejo passed away on March 27, 1974. Having no surviving children, Eduardo Santos left his legacy to his nephews, Hernando Santos Castillo and Enrique Santos Castillo, who took charge of managing the newspaper company, the former as deputy director and the latter as general editor.

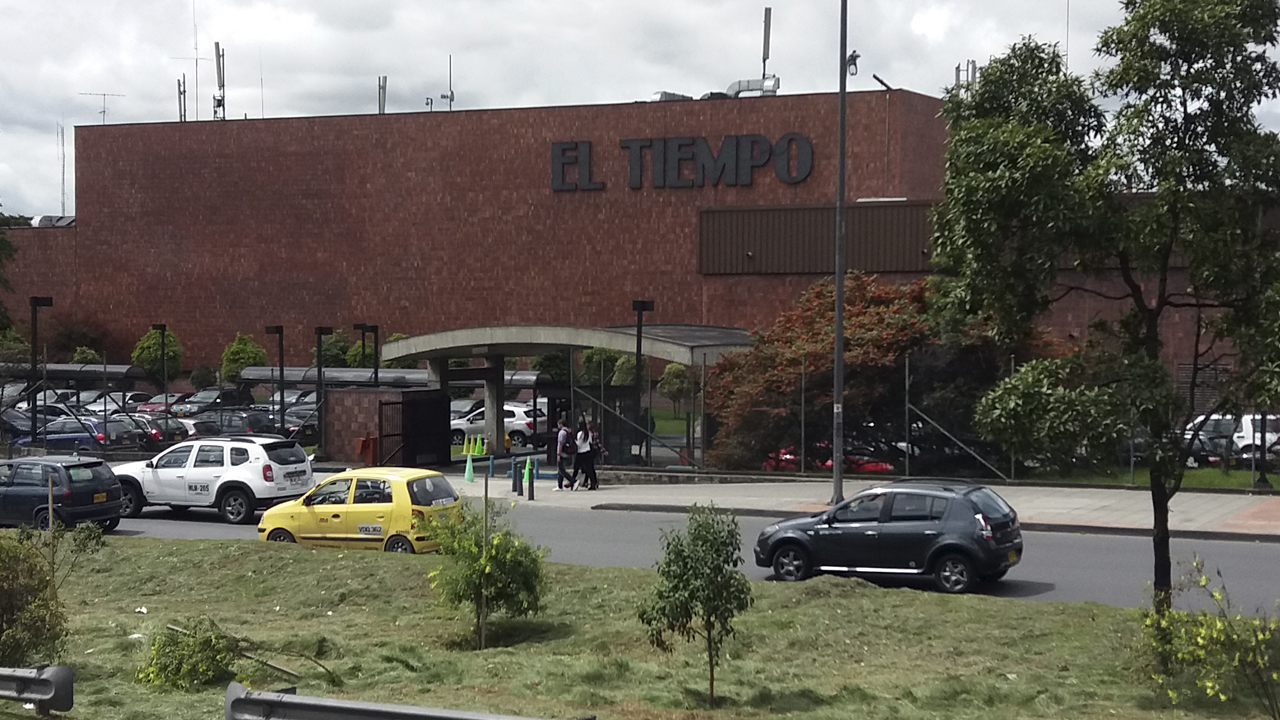
El Tiempo building on Avenida El Dorado with Carrera 69, in Bogotá.

=== End of the 20th century ===
The Linotype era ended on April 27, 1978. Starting the next day, El Tiempo moved its offices and workshops to its current headquarters at the corner of Avenida El Dorado and Carrera 69, designed by the architect Germán Samper Gnecco. Issue 23 285, Friday, April 28, was edited by the photocomposition system and printed on the new Metro Headliner rotary presses, capable of printing 70,000 copies of 56 color pages per hour. In later years, two Metroliner rotary presses (1981 and 1995) and one Newsliner (1998) were acquired.

Hernando Santos Castillo "Hersán" replaced Roberto García-Peña on July 18, 1981, and served as director until his death in April 1999. In turn, García-Peña became "director emeritus" until his death in 1993.

From the last third of the 1970s and the beginning of the 1980s, the newspaper has published magazines specializing in different topics. Thus, "Carrusel" (women's issues, fashion and decoration) appeared on March 18, 1977, and "Elenco" (Television, film, music and entertainment) appeared on November 1, 1979, and "Motor" appeared on November 1, 1979. (Vehicles), on November 28, 1981, "To Inhabit" (Architecture), on November 5, 1983, and "To Travel" (Tourism), on November 9, 1983.

To celebrate the 25,000th edition, the so-called "Time Capsule" was created, a hermetically sealed device containing 1,408 items from daily life in the 20th century, donated by citizens from across the country. The capsule was buried in the building's garden on March 3, 1983, and is to be opened in July 2052, when El Tiempo reaches its 50,000th edition. Interestingly, President Belisario Betancur failed to activate the sealing mechanism. To respect protocol, they had to wait until the guests had left, and in the early morning, they extracted the capsule, injected it with nitrogen and argon, sealed it, and reburied it under concrete.

In the wake of the wave of violence unleashed against journalists by drug traffickers in the mid-1980s, and following the assassination of Guillermo Cano Isaza, director of El Espectador, El Tiempo, the main national newspapers, radio and television news programs, and opinion magazines formed the "United Front," through which the grouped media outlets jointly and simultaneously produced, wrote, and published a series of special reports revealing the links between drug traffickers and the country's political, economic, and social activities, and their responsibility for the actions against the journalists. communicators.

On March 21, 1988, the newspaper's new layout was unveiled, following a process that had begun internally the previous year. Except for some minor modifications introduced in 2000, including a reduction in format from 35cm x 58cm to 32cm x 56cm, this design remained until 2010. The Sunday editions, on the other hand, underwent four substantial changes, in 1990, 1994, 1997, and 2000.

With the creation of the regional editions, different supplements dedicated to each part of the country were born, such as "El Tiempo Cali" in 1991, "Tolima 7 Días" in 1992, "Llano 7 Días" and "Boyacá 7 Días" in 1993, "El Tiempo Caribe" in 1994, "Cundinamarca 7 Días" in 1996, "Café 7 Días" in 1998, and "El Tiempo Medellín" in 2000. Most of these supplements began to circulate weekly, in tabloid format, and gradually became daily sections, in universal format.

=== 21st Century ===
After the death of Hernando Santos Castillo, the last directors of El Tiempo belonging to the Santos family took over: Enrique Santos Calderón and Rafael Santos Calderón. On August 1, 2007, the acquisition of 55% of the newspaper's shares and 40% of City TV (Bogotá) by Grupo Planeta was finalized. This meant, shortly after, the arrival of journalist Roberto Pombo. Luis Fernando Santos held the symbolic position of president of the board of directors, until it was eliminated. Currently, only Rafael Santos Calderón remains as director of publications.

On January 30, 2011, El Tiempo celebrated its 100th anniversary, and to celebrate, it published a 128-page special, along with the news edition of that day. Likewise, a commemorative digital version of the centennial was posted on the website.

Faced with the failure of the bidding process for the third private national television channel, in which Grupo Planeta was competing to win the contract, and consequently, El Tiempo, the Spanish investment conglomerate put its stake in the publishing house up for sale. The negotiation, through which the economic group of Colombian businessman Luis Carlos Sarmiento Angulo acquired the part The acquisition of El Tiempo by Grupo Planeta was finalized between March and April 2012. This allowed Sarmiento Angulo, who already held a smaller stake (33%), to control 88% of the newspaper's shares. Shortly afterwards, he bought the shares of the Santos family and Abdón Espinosa Valderrama, thus becoming the sole owner of the newspaper.

There have been two major changes throughout the decade. On October 3, 2010, the redesign of the newspaper was presented, whose development was led by the Cuban creative Mario García. Opinions about the newspaper's new image were divided, because even some of the newspaper's editors pointed out that the visual aspect was prioritized over the quality of the information. This version was in effect for seven years. On October 22, 2017, after 15 months of preparation, the Sunday edition was published with a new layout and design, eliminating the colored headers in each section and returning to a more classic and traditional look, which, unlike the previous one, was well received by the public.

In March 2025, construction began on the new headquarters of El Tiempo newspaper, located on a 15,000-square-meter lot in the Fontibón district, near El Dorado International Airport. It will consist of two buildings: one for the printing plant, with rotary presses brought from Spain, and another for the administrative offices, the newspaper's newsroom, and the CityTV studios. Construction is expected to be completed in the first half of 2026, and the move to the new facilities will take place gradually throughout that year. The current headquarters will be demolished to make way for an urban renewal project, undertaken by Construcciones Planificadas S.A., a subsidiary of the Luis Carlos Sarmiento Angulo Organization. Thirty-five percent of the site will be dedicated to a park. The entire project is expected to be completed in approximately eight years.

== Awards ==
Both directors and editors, columnists, photojournalists, journalists and designers have received numerous awards and recognitions from public and private organizations, and journalistic associations based in Colombia and abroad.

== CEET Internet Portals ==
Their website is the most visited Colombian website in the country. Their alliance with Terra Networks began in 2000, after acquiring the portals Laciudad.com and eureka.com.co, created by the New Media division of CEET. This alliance was dissolved on August 15, 2006.

In addition to presenting news as the day progresses, the eltiempo.com website has a digital archive of news articles published since 1990, and most print editions can also be accessed through the Google News portal.

Closely linked to the newspaper is the local television channel Citytv, launched in February 1999.

On October 5, 2010, El Tiempo Televisión (El Tiempo Television) began broadcasting news continuously, 24 hours a day. Since February 24, 2019, due to low viewership, it has mostly rebroadcast the CityTV signal.

== Controversies ==
There have been several disputes between El Tiempo and El Espectador regarding their respective circulation figures. Among the documented episodes are those that occurred in 1951, 1960, 1962, 1982 and 1994. In all cases, El Tiempo indicated that circulation should be measured and certified by determining the number of copies purchased by readers, as stipulated in the methodology of the Audit Bureau of Circulations, ABC. El Espectador, for its part, indicated that circulation should be measured based on the number of copies printed and delivered to points of sale. The National Association of Advertisers (ANDA) intervened in the discussion and suggested adopting certified circulation.

Lucas Caballero Calderón, "Klim," a prominent columnist for El Tiempo since the 1940s, resigned from his position on March 30, 1977, as a result of the confrontation he waged through his writings with then-President Alfonso López Michelsen. As was learned decades later, López summoned the newspaper's directors and threatened to resign if "Klim" continued attacking him in his columns. Hernando Santos Castillo, deputy director of the newspaper, met with Caballero and asked him to moderate his attitude, because El Tiempo had given its full support to the president. "Klim" considered this a clear act of censorship against him and immediately submitted his resignation. In solidarity, his brother, Eduardo Caballero Calderón "Swann" and his cousin Enrique Caballero Escovar, also resigned.

The newspaper was criticized for its response to a column by journalist Claudia López, in which she questioned the handling of the presidential program "Agro Ingreso Seguro" and suggested that the newspaper had a conflict of interest with then-presidential candidate Juan Manuel Santos. Reflections on a Scandal, El Tiempo, October 13, 2009[Roberto Pombo], the newspaper's director since 2009, rejected the accusations, interpreted the column as a resignation, and fired López.

On September 18, 2012, José Obdulio Gaviria, former advisor during the administration of Álvaro Uribe Vélez, published a column titled "We Have to Believe Them," in which he made a series of unverified claims and speculations about the negotiation of a kidnapping and the release of the hostage by the FARC, amidst the ongoing peace process with President Juan Manuel Santos. Following the controversy generated in the media and social networks, The following day, El Tiempo addressed the issue in its editorial, strongly criticizing Gaviria and stating that while columnists have complete freedom of opinion, they must also be responsible for what they write, and above all, that when making accusations, they must have sufficient evidence to corroborate their claims. affirming. Roberto Pombo maintained that if Gaviria submitted his resignation letter, he, in his capacity as director of El Tiempo, would accept it. On September 25, it was reported that El Tiempo's management decided to suspend Gaviria's column and remove him from the newspaper.

On May 6, 2014, Fernando Londoño, former Minister of the Interior of Colombia and a contributor to the newspaper for ten years, published a column titled "Santos's Eight Thousand," in which he launched harsh criticisms of President Juan Manuel Santos and drew a comparison between the current situation of his government and that of the controversial president Ernesto Samper Pizano, due to the Process 8000 investigation against him. He also mentioned the alleged secret negotiations between the government and a group of drug traffickers for their surrender to justice, in which the controversial campaign advisor JJ Rendón acted as mediator. According to Londoño, the negotiations fell apart because Santos prioritized the Havana peace talks with the Revolutionary Armed Forces of Colombia (FARC) to boost his reelection bid. Enrique Santos Calderón, the president's brother, is participating in these talks. Londoño even accused Santos of bending the State to the FARC, communism, and the political left led by Cuba, and of, once the agreement was achieved, facilitating the assassination of former President Álvaro Uribe Vélez and himself, in order to intimidate the supporters of the Colombian political right.

That same day, the newspaper's editorial, titled "Regarding a Column," questioned Londoño's claims, arguing that he offered no evidence to support his accusations against Santos and merely connected the dots and made arbitrary conjectures. Going further, the editorial described Londoño's column as disrespectful, indecent, and indicative of the polarization and intolerance toward dissenting opinions prevalent in the country. However, El Tiempo's management allowed the column to be published, so as not to portray Fernando Londoño as a martyr for freedom of expression. Londoño submitted his resignation letter to the editor, Roberto Pombo, on May 7, 2014.

Just days after writing a strongly worded critique of the newspaper's current owner in her regular column, Margarita Rosa de Francisco resigned from her opinion piece on February 16, 2021. In the article, which sparked considerable controversy, she stated that Sarmiento Angulo was "unmentionable" due to his enormous economic power, which allowed him to control half the country, and his political power, because it was he, and not the other "unmentionable" figure (former president Álvaro Uribe Vélez), who actually made and broke presidents in Colombia. Luz Ángela Sarmiento, the businessman's daughter, also responded in the editorial pages. In the statement announcing her resignation, De Francisco stated that it was an ethical dilemma to continue writing for a newspaper whose stance was contrary to her own.

== Print Editions of El Tiempo ==
Currently, the newspaper prints nine different editions, depending on the region of the country they are distributed to:

'Bogotá:' It circulates in the Capital District, where three different editions are published: South-Central, North-Lake, and West-Chapinero. The standard edition is also sent to Cundinamarca, Boyacá, Tolima, and Meta, including in each case the sections "Cundinamarca 7 Days," "Boyacá 7 Days," "Tolima 7 Days," and "Llano 7 Days."

Caribbean: La Guajira, Cesar, Magdalena, Atlántico, Bolívar, Córdoba, and Sucre. Since October 1991, it has been printed in Barranquilla, at a dedicated printing plant to which the printing plates are sent via satellite.

Medellín: For Antioquia and Chocó.

Coffee Region: ("Café 7 Días"): Caldas, Quindío, and Risaralda.

Western Region: Valle del Cauca, Cauca, and Nariño. Since October 1991, it has been printed in Cali, at its own plant, to which the printing plates are sent via satellite from Bogotá.

National: This is the standard newspaper that circulates in the rest of the country.

El Tiempo is a member of the Grupo de Diarios América (GDA), an organization made up of eleven of the most important newspapers in Latin America.

== Magazines and Special Supplements of El Tiempo ==
- Motor: Bi-weekly publication with information about automobiles. (First and last Wednesday of each month)
- Carrusel: Focused on entertainment and variety. (Bi-weekly, sold separately from the newspaper)
- Habitar: Information about housing (Monthly, Saturday, and only for subscribers)
- Lecturas Dominicales: Cultural and literary supplement.
- El Tiempo Cali, El Tiempo Medellín, El Tiempo Caribe, Cundinamarca 7 Días, Boyacá 7 Días, Tolima 7 Días, Café 7 Días, and Llano 7 Días: These are sections with local information included with the newspaper in each of those regions.
- Bocas: A Sunday magazine with reports and interviews with current figures. (Sold separately from the newspaper.)
- Classifieds: Pages dedicated to ads paid by users to buy, rent, or sell goods and services, as well as legal notices. (Currently only published in the Friday, Saturday, and Sunday editions.)

== Distribution ==
El Tiempo is published in six regional editions:

- Bogotá
- Caribe (Barranquilla, Cartagena, Santa Marta, Sincelejo, Riohacha and Valledupar)
- Medellín
- Café (Pereira, Manizales, Armenia)
- Cali (Cali, Popayán, Pasto)
- Región, for the remainder of the country.

On Sundays there are special sections. For about 3 years it published every Sunday a special section with a weekly selection of articles from The New York Times, translated into Spanish and using the same pictures. This section was dropped in January 2008 and since August 2008 it has been published by rival newspaper El Espectador.

El Tiempo is part of Grupo de Diarios América (America Newspaper Group), an organization of eleven leading newspapers from eleven Latin American countries.
