= Carla Giraldo =

Colombian actress, model and singer (born 1986)

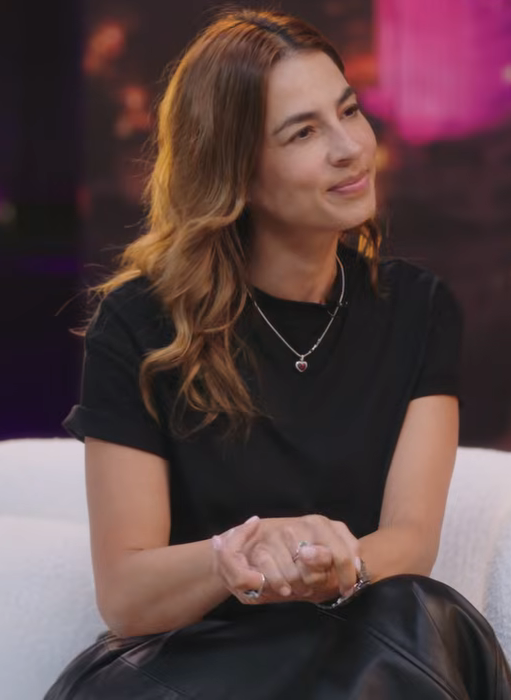
- Giraldo in 2026
- Born: Carla Evelyn Giraldo Quintero; August 30, 1986 (age 40); Medellín, Colombia
- Occupations: Actress, singer, model
- Years active: 1999–present

Carla Evelyn Giraldo Quintero (born on August 30, 1986, in Medellín, Colombia) is a Colombian actress, model and singer.

She made her debut in television when she was 13 in telenovela Me Llaman Lolita where she portrays young Lolita Rengifo.

== Filmography ==
=== Telenovela ===
- 2018 – Las Munecas de la Mafia 2 .... Janeth
- 2014 – Nora, La Emprendedora .... Nora
- 2013 – La Madame .... Maribel
- 2013 – Los Graduados .... Gabriela "Gaby" Torres
- 2011 – Los Herederos Del Monte .... Rosario
- 2010 – El Clon ....Latiffa
- 2009 – Verano en Venecia .... Manuela Tirado Toledo
- 2006 – La diva .... Nicole
- 2005 – Juego limpio .... Claudia
- 2000 – Pobre Pablo .... Jenny Paola Guerrero
- 1999 – Francisco el Matemático .... Tatiana Samper
- 1999 – Me llaman Lolita .... Lolita Rangel (niña)

=== Series ===
- 2013 – Cumbia Ninja .... Talita
- 2008 – Tiempo final .... Claudia Guerra
- 2004 – Enigmas del más allá .... Valeria Herrante

=== Reality ===
- 2024-2026 - La casa de los famosos Colombia .... Host
- 2021 - MasterChef Celebrity .... Winner
