= Festivali i Këngës (Kosovo) =

Kosovan song contest

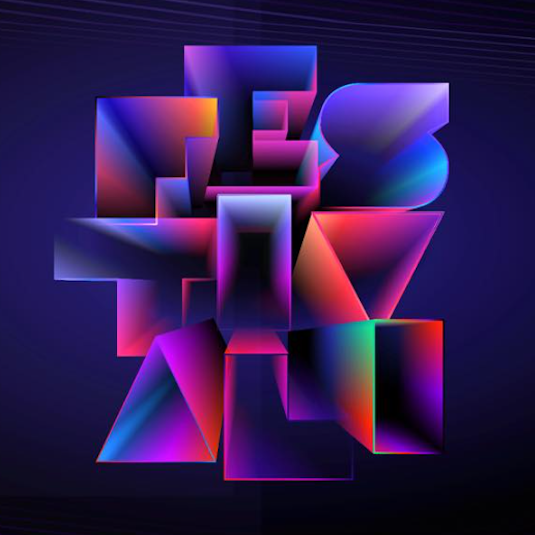
- Logo of the Festival for the third edition (2025)
- Genre: Various
- Dates: October
- Locations: Palace of Youth and Sports; Pristina, Kosovo
- Years active: 2023–present
- Organiser: Radio Television of Kosovo (RTK)
- Website: rtklive.com/festivali

Festivali i Këngës në RTK (Albanian: [fɛstiˈvali i ˈkəŋɡəs nə ɾətəˈkə]; transl. "The Song Festival on RTK"), simply known as Festivali i Këngës and informally as Fest, is an annual music competition in Kosovo organised by the national broadcaster Radio Television of Kosovo (RTK) since 2023. It is broadcast on RTK 1, RTK 2 and Radio Kosova 1, as well as on RTSH in Albania and on MRT 2 in North Macedonia. It was replaced by Akordet e Kosovës, a revival of the 1963–1989 contest of the same name, on 30 October 2026.

== History ==
The contest was modelled based on the festival of the same name held in Albania since 1962 and used as the Albanian national final for the Eurovision Song Contest since 2003. Kosovo, formerly part of Yugoslavia, has never participated in the Eurovision Song Contest on its own, but the contest has been broadcast in the territory since 1961 and a number of Kosovan artists have represented Albania or Serbia in the event.

Despite its inability to become a full member of the European Broadcasting Union (EBU) in order to take part in the contest, in February 2023 Kosovan broadcaster RTK started to develop the format, with the long-term aim of using it as its national selection for Eurovision. The format was ultimately defined on 7 March 2023. In October 2023, shortly before the launch of its first edition, the festival's director Adi Krasta reported that he had been in contact with people at EBU who had expressed "extreme enthusiasm" regarding the event. Director-general of the EBU Noel Curran made a remote appearance during the first night of the festival to express his congratulations.

RTK stated it would apply for EBU membership in June 2024, having reaffirmed the intention to participate in Eurovision and use the next edition of the festival to select its 2025 entrant.

According to reports beginning in May 2026, the contest is set to be replaced by Akordet e Kosovës under a more ambitious format, as a revival of the 1963–1989 contest of the same name. This will occur alongside the first edition of a corresponding children's contest.

== Editions ==
=== 2023 ===
The inaugural edition of Festivali i Këngës was held at the Great Hall of the Palace of Youth and Sports in Pristina, directed by Adi Krasta and co-hosted by Krasta and Besim Dina (all shows) alongside Edona Kasapolli (first night), Anjeza Shahini (second night) and Edona Reshitaj (third night); it consisted of two qualification shows on 26 and 27 October 2023 and a final on 28 October 2023. The artistic director for this edition was Florent Boshnjaku, while performances were conducted by Alfred Kaçinari, Edon Ramadani and Valton Beqiri; the four, as well as Shpëtim Saraçi and Visar Kuçi, also served as orchestrators.

A submission period was open between 2 June and 9 September 2023 to select eighteen competing entries. At the festival, a 5-member jury – consisting of Adi Hila, Alban Nimani, Zake Prelvukaj, Ulla Sjöström and chair Alma Bektashi – voted to determine ten qualifiers from the first phase and the first three places in the final. The winner was La Fazani (Arbër Salihu) with "Oj Kosovë".

A number of guest performers also made an appearance in this edition, namely Bektashi herself, Alban Nimani, Dafina Zeqiri, Enver Petrovci, Fitnete Tuda, Genc Salihu, Ilire Vinca and her daughters, Irma Libohova, Kamela Islamaj and Teuta Kurti, Timo Flloko, Shpat Deda, and Xuxi.

Qualifying phase
R/O		Artist	Song	Songwriter(s)	Result
Show 1	Show 2	Artist	Song	Songwriter(s)	Result
3	16	Albin Nikprelaj	"Ajo"	Enis Mullaj; Erjona Rushiti	Qualified
4	15	Angus Dei	"Një zemër për dy"	Erjon Zaloshnja	Qualified
5	14	Ariela Krasniqi	"Emri grua"	Gjergj Jorgaqi	—N/a
6	13	Auron Deva	"Çmimi i dashnisë"	Korab Shaqiri	Qualified
2	17	Bana Zahiti	"Dukat"	Arbana Zahiti	—N/a
7	12	Ermal Demiri	"Merri"	Gentiana Azizi; Gëzim Hasani	—N/a
15	4	Franc Koruni	"Shqip"	Franc Koruni	—N/a
16	3	Hilmi Obertinca	"Pa ty s'më rrihet"	Hilmi Obertinca	Qualified
1	18	InorgA	"Shumë herë më nervozojnë"	Agron Hajdari	—N/a
12	7	Klea Dina	"Trenat"	Drenusha Zajmi; Memli Kelmendi	Qualified
8	11	La Fazani	"Oj Kosovë"	Arbër Salihu	Qualified
13	6	Mentor Mripa	"Po ju rrëfehem"	Bekim Bislimi; Riza Dolaku	—N/a
9	10	Neki Emra	"Heroi im"	Neki Emra	Qualified
17	2	Nita Latifi	"Marrëzi"	Nita Latifi	Qualified
14	5	Saranda Alija	"Mendoj ku je"	Arbër Krasniqi	Qualified
11	8	Teuta Statovci	"Sekreti i tij"	Arianit Abazi; Dardan Gjinolli; Yll Limani	—N/a
18	1	Urban Band	"Ëndrrat s'kanë faj"	Endrik Beba; Klodian Rexhepaj	Qualified
10	9	Vjosa Shehu	"Vetes"	Junior Akwety; Vjosa Shehu	—N/a

Final
R/O	Artist(s)	Song	Songwriter(s)	Result & Awards
7	Albin Nikprelaj	"Ajo"	Enis Mullaj; Erjona Rushiti	3rd place
4	Angus Dei	"Një zemër për dy"	Erjon Zaloshnja	2nd place
1	Auron Deva	"Çmimi i dashnisë"	Korab Shaqiri	Unknown
8	Hilmi Obertinca	"Pa ty s'më rrihet"	Hilmi Obertinca	Unknown
5	Klea Dina	"Trenat"	Drenusha Zajmi; Memli Kelmendi	Unknown
9	La Fazani	"Oj Kosovë"	Arbër Salihu	1st place Municipality of Pristina Award
3	Neki Emra	"Heroi im"	Neki Emra	Unknown
6	Nita Latifi	"Marrëzi"	Nita Latifi	Unknown
10	Saranda Alija	"Mendoj ku je"	Arbër Krasniqi	Orchestra Award
2	Urban Band	"Ëndrrat s'kanë faj"	Endrik Beba; Klodian Rexhepaj	Unknown

=== 2024 ===
The RTK Song Festival took place at the Palace of Youth in Pristina, and was broadcast live on RTK. In its second edition, the Kosovo Radio Television Song Festival featured 16 artists on October 24, 25, and 26, 2024.

The winner’s trophy for this edition was the 'Blue Diamond', symbolizing Kosovo, its flag, and its blue color. The festival jury consists of Minire Fetahu, the chairperson, Jane Sugarman, Ardiana Pajaziti, Valbona Selimllari, and Blerta Zeqiri.

Before the festival commenced, Festim Kabashi and Fëllënza Çitaku recited poems by Gjergj Fishta, Faik Konica, Fan Noli, Atë Zef Pllumi, and Ukshin Hoti.

Semi-Final
R/O		Artist	Song	Songwriter(s)	Result
Show 1	Show 2	Artist	Song	Songwriter(s)	Result
7	10	Ardita Begu	"Fundosu në dritë"	Ylljeta Kokolli; Atdhe Marku	—N/a
3	14	Agim Poshka	"Ndarja erdhi"	Ismail Kadare; Agim Poshka	Qualified
11	6	Ardit Stafaj	“Faji”	Ardit Stafaj	Qualified
13	4	Arnitë Kastrati	"Blla Blla"	Ardiana Gashi; Arnitë Kastrati	Qualified
16	1	Bruna Sata	"Ti je i pa shpirt"	Ramazan Ceka; Artion Qamili	—N/a
5	12	InorgA	”SEKS MASHINA NGA PRISHTINA”	Inorga	—N/a
4	13	Jehona Lumi	"Shko"	Jehona Lumi; Rinor Ukimeri	—N/a
8	9	Besmir Shishko	"Unë Ajo"	Armend Shala; Besmir Shishko	Qualified
9	8	Bledi Kaso	"Një të vetme ka në jetë"	Eriona Rushiti; Endrit Shani	Qualified
1	16	Dea Strica	"N'Shqipni"	Dea Strica	Qualified
10	7	Endrit Krasniqi	"Flas me gjethen"	Bekim Këpuska	Qualified
2	15	Greta Azizi	"Verës"	Ardiana Gashi; Valon Gashi; Diell Gashi	Qualified
15	2	Luna Çausholli	"Dielli të më shohë"	Pandi Laco; Endrit Shani	—N/a
6	11	Rei Bezhani	"Zonja tradhëti"	Eriona Rushiti; Enis Mullaj	Qualified
12	5	Santino De Bartolo	"Unë jam Arbëresh"	Santino De Bartolo	—N/a
14	3	Vlona Boshnjaku	"Lotët"	Rozana Radi Kledi Bahiti	—N/a

The live broadcast on RTK began at 20:10 with the arrival of guests on the red carpet of the Palace of Youth, while the festival officially started at 21:00. The contest was broadcast live on RTK 1, RTK 2, Radio Kosovo, and on the digital platforms of the public broadcaster.

The jury awarded the second prize to Greta Azizi for the song “Verës”, while the third prize went to Dea Strica for the song “N’Shqipni”. Endrit Krasniqi is the winner of the second edition of the RTK Song Festival, receiving the “Blue Diamond” trophy for the song “Flas me gjethen”. The prize from the Palace of Youth and the capital was awarded to Besmir Shishko for the song “Unë Ajo”. The orchestra prize was awarded by the festival's artistic director, Florent Boshnjaku, to Arnite Kastrati for the song “Blla blla”.

Final
R/O	Artist(s)	Song	Songwriter(s)	Result & Awards
6	Agim Poshka	"Ndarja erdhi"	Ismail Kadare; Agim Poshka	Unknown
8	Ardit Stafaj	“Faji”	Ardit Stafaj	Unknown
7	Arnitë Kastrati	"Blla Blla"	Ardiana Gashi; Arnitë Kastrati	Orchestra Prize
9	Besmir Shishko	"Unë Ajo"	Armend Shala; Besmir Shishko	Palace of Youth Prize; The Capital Prize
1	Bledi Kaso	"Një të vetme ka në jetë"	Eriona Rushiti; Endrit Shani	Unknown
4	Dea Strica	"N'Shqipni"	Dea Strica	3rd Place
2	Endrit Krasniqi	"Flas me gjethe"	Bekim Këpuska	1st Place
3	Greta Azizi	"Verës"	Ardiana Gashi; Valon Gashi; Diell Gashi	2nd Place
5	Rei Bezhani	"Zonja tradhëti"	Eriona Rushiti; Enis Mullaj	Unknown

=== 2025 ===
The third edition of the Kosovo Radio and Television Song Festival took place in the Palace of Youth. The festival was moderated by Dukagjin Podrimaj and Rina Krasniqi.

The third edition opened with the song “Këngë Moj” by composer Musa Piperku, performed by the Siparantum choir, under the direction of conductor Memli Kelmendi.

Qualifying phase
R/O		Artist	Song	Songwriter(s)	Result
Show 1	Show 2	Artist	Song	Songwriter(s)	Result
2	8	Almir Krraba	"Nuk ka si ti"	Almir Krraba	—N/a
17	1	Arjeta Palushaj	"Andrra"	Eriona Rushiti	Qualified
8	5	Arsi Bako	"Rreze Zjarr"	Gjergj Kacinari	Qualified
5	15	Art Lokaj	"Ty"	Art Lokaj	Qualified
15	13	Bledi Kaso	"S’do të doja dy jetë"	Pandi Laqo; Endrit Shani	—N/a
13	14	Dea Berisha	"Afër"	Lis Boshtrakaj; Besart Zhuja	—N/a
7	9	Egzon Pireci	"Kënga Jonë"	Ilir Berani	—N/a
3	4	Elmedinë Ramushi	"A po m’sheh"	Elmedinë Ramushi	Qualified
12	2	Florent Abrashi	"Unë dhe ti"	Florent Abrashi	Qualified
6	17	Kiara Juba	"Nirvana"	Eriona Rushiti; Enis Millaj	Qualified
11	16	Klea Dina	"At"	Ana	Qualified
9	12	Laorjan Ejlli	"Një natë shkruajta për ty"	Elvis Mula; Osman Mula	Qualified
16	18	Nita Latifi & Algert Sala	"Pija"	Algert Sala	—N/a
18	6	Santino de Bartolo	"Naze Naze"	Vorea Ujko; Santino de Bartolo	—N/a
4	20	Semi Tafaj	"Vazhdoj"	Algert Sala; Kejdi Musta	—N/a
1	19	Teutë Halili	"Amin"	Diell Gashi	Qualified
10	3	Vjosa Shehu	"Alo"	Valon Gashi	—N/a
19	7	Vlera Kastrati	"Nanë"	Vlera Kastrati	—N/a
20	11	Xuxi	"Identitet"	Andos	Qualified
14	10	Zergjina Hasanaj	"Pres"	Jetmir Mehmedaj	—N/a

Final
R/O	Artist(s)	Song	Songwriter(s)	Result & Awards
1	Arjeta Palushaj	"Andrra"	Eriona Rushiti	3rd Place
4	Arsi Bako	"Rreze Zjarr"	Gjergj Kacinari	1st Place; The Capital Prize
5	Art Lokaj	"Ty"	Art Lokaj	Orchestra Prize
9	Elmedinë Ramushi	"A po m’sheh"	Elmedinë Ramushi	Unknown
2	Florent Abrashi	"Unë dhe ti"	Florent Abrashi	2nd Place
10	Kiara Juba	"Nirvana"	Eriona Rushiti; Enis Millaj	Unknown
3	Klea Dina	"At"	Ana	Unknown
6	Laorjan Ejlli	"Një natë shkruajta për ty"	Elvis Mula; Osman Mula	Unknown
8	Teutë Halili	"Amin"	Diell Gashi	Silver Pen "Best Text" Prize
7	Xuxi	"Identitet"	Andos	Unknown
