= UEFA Euro 2004 broadcasting rights =

Football tournament broadcasting rights

UEFA Euro 2004 was an international football tournament that took place in June and July 2004 involving 16 men's national teams from nations affiliated to the Union of European Football Associations (UEFA). The tournament was broadcast via television and radio all over the world.

== Broadcasters ==
=== UEFA ===
Territory	Rights holder	Ref
Albania	RTSH	
Armenia	APMTV	
Austria	ORF	
Azerbaijan	Lider TV	
Belarus	BTRC	
Belgium	RTBF; VRT	
Bosnia and Herzegovina	RTVBH	
Bulgaria	BNT	
Croatia	HRT	
Cyprus	CyBC	
Czech Republic	Czech Television	
Denmark	DR; TV 2	
Estonia	ETV	
Finland	Yle	
France	TF1; France Télévisions; Eurosport France	
Georgia	GPB	
Germany	ARD; ZDF	
Greece	ERT	
Hungary	MTV	
Iceland	RÚV	
Ireland	RTÉ	
Israel	IBA	
Italy	RAI	
Latvia	LTV	
Lithuania	LRT	
Macedonia	MKRTV	
Republic of Moldova	TRM	
Netherlands	NOS	
Norway	TV 2	
Poland	TVP	
Portugal	RTP; SIC; TVI; SportTV	
Romania	TVR	
Russia	Pervyi Kanal; VGTRK	
Serbia and Montenegro	RTS; RTCG	
Slovakia	STV	
Slovenia	RTV Slovenija	
Spain	TVE	
Sweden	SVT; TV4	
Switzerland	SRG SSR	
Turkey	TRT	
Ukraine	NTU	
United Kingdom	BBC; ITV; British Eurosport	

=== Rest of the world ===
Territory	Rights holder	Ref
Africa	SuperSport	
Algeria	ENTV	
Brazil	SporTV	
People's Republic of China	CCTV	
Colombia	Canal 1	
Egypt	ERTU	
Hong Kong	Cable TV	
Indonesia	RCTI	
Japan	TBS; WOWOW	
Jordan	JRTV	
Lebanon	TL	
Kosovo	RTK	
Malaysia	Media Prima (8TV)	
Mexico	Televisa (Canal 9)	
Morocco	RTM	
Singapore	StarHub TV; MediaCorp	
South Africa	e.tv	
South Asia	ESPN Star Sports	
Thailand	Channel 3; Channel 7	
Tunisia	ERTT	
Vietnam	HTV; VTV	
United States	INHD; Setanta Sports; DirecTV; Fox Sports en Español	
