= Three Sheets =

- Directed by: Mike Kelly
- Starring: Zane Lamprey
- Country of origin: United States
- No. of seasons: 4
- No. of episodes: 52 (list of episodes)

Production
- Editors: Brian Musser; Alex Perrault
- Running time: Approx. 30m

Original release
- Network: MOJO HD until Dec 1, 2008; FLN July 20, 2009 - May 30, 2010; Travel Channel April 14, 2010 - May 5, 2010, June 30, 2010 - July 2010; Spike February 8, 2011 - 2011
- Release: June 18, 2006 – December 7, 2009

Three Sheets is an international travelogue/pub-crawl television series which aired on Spike in the United States. The first three seasons of the show originally aired on MOJO HD before moving to FLN for the fourth season. Repeats of the show briefly aired on The Travel Channel before being picked up by Spike. The title is taken from the popular expression, "three sheets to the wind," referring to one who is staggering drunk.

Comedian Zane Lamprey hosts a humorous trip around the world sampling the local well-known (and little-known) food and drink while also engaging in local alcohol-related customs. In each episode Lamprey samples various food and drinks and learns about the customs and libations of that area, and then experiences the local hangover cure. The series is produced by Screaming Flea Productions.

== Format ==
Each episode begins with an overview of the places Zane will visit on his trip. Typically over the course of the episode Zane will introduce different local alcoholic beverages and spend some time with either a bartender or alcohol-maker to learn more about the drinks discussed. Often when a new term or item is introduced a note will appear on the screen to provide further information or help with pronunciation.

A number of recurring segments and gags surface in almost every episode. A voice-over feature starring "The Professor" will occasionally appear to introduce an in-depth history or description of something culturally significant, a locale, or the science behind a particular drink. Zane also often refers to his drinking buddy, a stuffed monkey named Pleepleus, who appears at random points in the show.

== Recurring characters ==
Throughout Zane's travels he meets a number of diverse and unique characters. During the "NY Pub Crawl", several of these individuals returned to the show. These included:

- Steve McKenna: A running gag on the show (see above), Zane's college friend Steve first made an actual appearance during the episode "Three Sheets to Kentucky". During the episode, Steve invented a drink (The Irish American) and ended the episode in typical Steve McKenna fashion. In the episode McKenna claimed to own Byrd's Country Store in Keeseville, NY. A Sunoco served as a background to his brief ad. It is assumed this Sunoco was his store. As of July, 2010 the store pictured in the episode, while still a Sunoco, is not owned by Mr. McKenna, having been sold some five+ months prior according to the current owner.
- Logan "The Beer Hunter": Logan travels the world always in search of the greatest brews. His zeal for beer was first documented during "Three Sheets to Belgium", the pilot episode of the show, where he met Zane at the Délirium Café in Brussels. He had a penchant for stealing Zane's beer.
- Jim the Cop: Jim, a New York police officer, ran into Zane in Puerto Rico. He lost a beer chugging contest and returned to the States in shame. He 'contacted MOJO to demand a rematch' to take place in NYC. During the "NYC Pub Crawl", Zane and Jim had a rematch. While the results were considerably closer, he lost again, while spilling a good deal of beer on his shirt. Zane now makes reference to someone who has spilled beer on themselves during the course of chugging a drink as having "Jim the Cop'd". He made a guest appearance during the Las Vegas episode where he wins at celebrity poker, defeating pro player and fellow MOJOHD show host Phil Laak. Jim was a friend of Zane's before the show.
- Pleepleus the Monkey: Pleepleus is a stuffed monkey and Zane's main travel companion so he does not have to drink alone at times. He's a stuffed monkey that is available on Zane's web site. He appeared in "Three Sheets" and now "Drinking Made Easy" on HDNet. When Zane was visiting Greece, prior to shooting "Three Sheets", his friend Steve McKenna asked what part of Greece he was going to. Knowing that Steve knew nothing about Greece, Zane told him that he was going to the island of Pleepleus, which was overrun with monkeys. Steve believed him. When Zane started shooting "Three Sheets", he tried to get the network to hire Steve as his sidekick. When they didn't, Zane hid the monkey in the show to taunt Steve, which turned into the drinking game. Zane still says that "Steve's job, co-hosting 'Drinking Made Easy', is so easy, a monkey could do it". The original costume was sold to Mad Horse Brewpub in Lovettsville, VA and can be seen there.
- Ski Patrol: Ski Patrol is defined as someone a little too interested in free drinks and camera time, usually being fairly intoxicated. This can be anyone that Zane happens across in his adventures. The term refers to an un-aired segment in which a creepy guy who wouldn't leave Zane alone tried to get the crew to follow him to a mountain ski patrol where he supposedly worked.
- Others: Often the crew will appear on camera, such as the show's field producer, Christina Kindwall; Eric, the sound guy; and Curtiss, the cameraman. Fellow MOJOHD show host Dave Hill (comedian) has featured on two episodes of Three Sheets in his outfit and persona for his television show The King of Miami.

== Drinking game rules ==
The show also doubles as a drinking game, introduced in the Costa Rica episode. The rules are as follows:

1. When Zane drinks, you drink.
2. The first person to spot a monkey (including real monkeys or Pleepleus the monkey), makes someone else drink. (Pleepleus shirts count.)
3. When Zane mentions his friend, Steve McKenna, everyone drinks.
4. When Zane or anyone burps, the last person to give the "Good Burp" sign (thumb on your forehead, pinky in the air) drinks.
5. If someone in the show "Jim-The-Cops" (spills their beverage while drinking) it’s a social. However, if YOU Jim-The-Cop, you have to buy someone a drink. If you're watching at home, or a friend's house, it’s your turn to make a run to the fridge. If you Jim-The-Cop while in a chugging contest, you get three seconds added to your time.
6. If you ever spot Zane holding a drink improperly, you can make someone drink.
7. Whenever you see a puppy, you drink. Zane creates this rule in the Moscow episode.
8. Make sure you make someone drink when something's blurred out in the show, like Coke products. This rule, by Zane, was found on the Zane Lamprey message center (shopping list for the Cape Town episode).
9. Whenever you drink, drink with a smile. (Just like the lemon in Lithuania.)

== "Save Three Sheets" ==
With the ending of the MOJO HD network on December 1, 2008, the future of Three Sheets was unclear. At the time, the third season had finished airing and the fourth season had been put into production with a majority of the shows completed; however, there was no network for the unaired fourth season shows. On December 9, 2008, Zane himself went to his fans to enlist their help in finding a new home for Three Sheets. He scheduled two rallies "to help save their favorite show from extinction".

After staging the fan rallies, Zane Lamprey and the new network officially announced in July 2009 that Three Sheets would begin airing on Fine Living Network on July 20, 2009.

== "Sheet It Forward" Movement ==
A small movement started in December 2009 with the stated goal of "making the world a better place one drink at a time". The rule for members of the movement is to purchase a drink for someone they don't know if they are seen wearing anything related to the show "Three Sheets".

== Travel Channel ==
On March 22, 2010, the Official Three Sheets Page on Facebook announced that Three Sheets would premiere on The Travel Channel and Travel Channel HD on April 14, 2010. It is stated as being "for one month only." Three Sheets finished its trial run on May 5, 2010. On June 18, 2010, Lamprey announced on his website that the Travel Channel has decided to air all 52 episodes in order starting June 30, 2010, at 11:00 and 11:30 pm ET. On August 8, 2010, Lamprey announced on his website that the Travel Channel had dropped the show from its lineup. On November 27, 2010, at a show for Zane Lamprey's and Steve McKenna's "Sing The Booze" tour, Steve McKenna announced that Spike will begin to air Three Sheets on Wednesday nights at 10:30 pm.

== Drinking Made Easy ==
Zane's follow-up incarnation, Drinking Made Easy, aired on the now-defunct HDNet. This newer show had a slightly different format than Three Sheets and focused on cities within the United States. Drinking Made Easy ended in 2013 after HDNet transitioned into AXS TV.
