= Antonio Esfandiari =

American poker player, former magician (b. 1978)

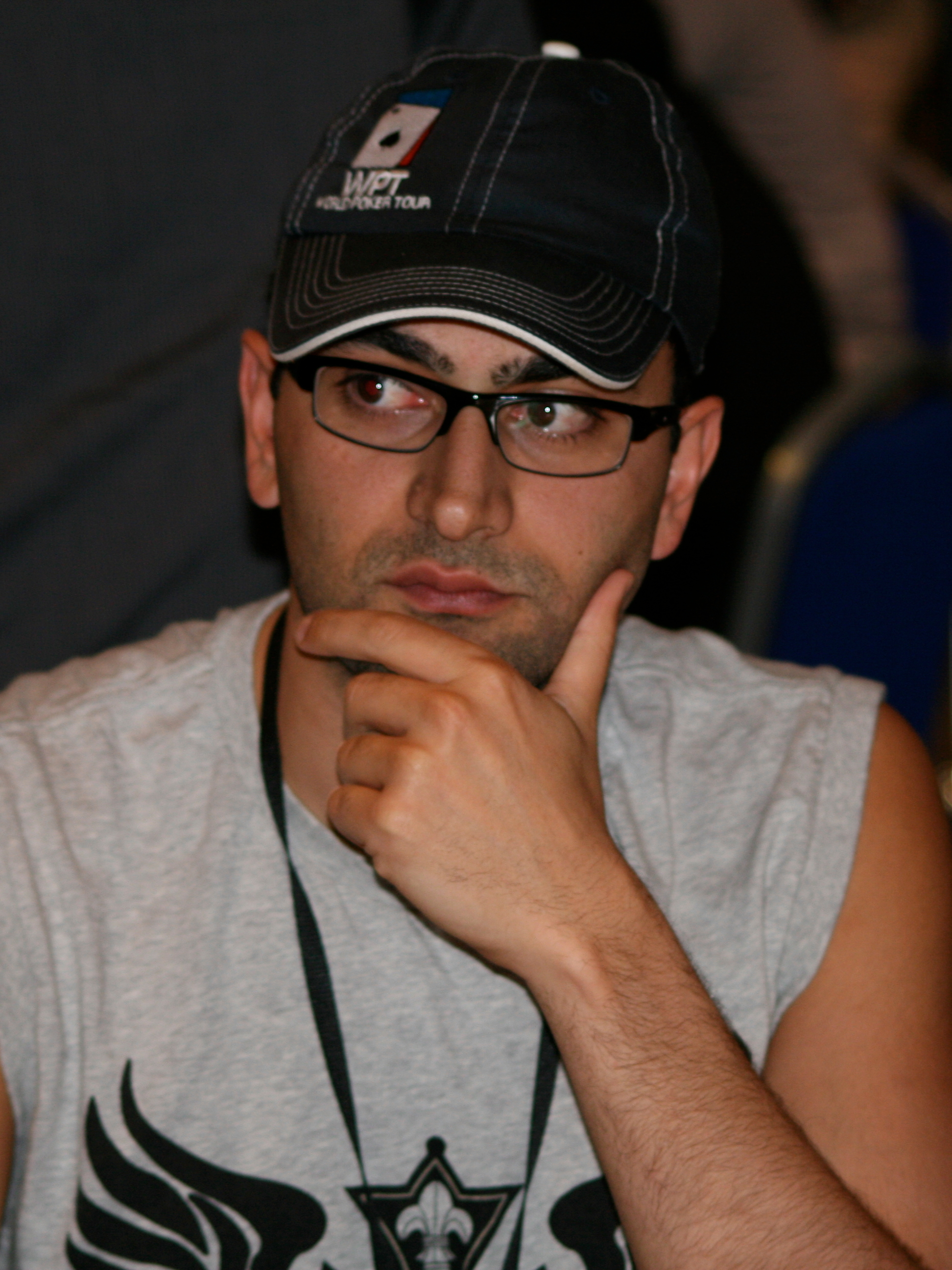
- Esfandiari in 2008
- Nickname: The Magician
- Born: Amir Esfandiary; December 8, 1978 (age 47); Tehran, Iran

World Series of Poker
- Bracelets: 3
- Final tables: 10
- Money finishes: 46
- Highest WSOP Main Event finish: 24th, 2009

World Poker Tour
- Titles: 2
- Final tables: 8
- Money finishes: 16

European Poker Tour
- Title: None
- Final table: 1
- Money finish: 1

Antonio "The Magician" Esfandiari (Persian: امیر اسفندیاری; born December 8, 1978, as Amir Esfandiary), is an Iranian American professional poker player and former professional magician, known for his elaborate chip tricks. Esfandiari was the face of the now-defunct poker site, UltimatePoker.com.

In addition to appearing on several poker television shows, he has won two World Poker Tour (WPT) championships and three World Series of Poker (WSOP) bracelets in his career, including the "Big One for One Drop" in 2012, a $1,000,000 buy-in tournament benefiting the One Drop Foundation. By winning the event, Esfandiari won the second largest single payout in tournament poker history at $18,346,673. Esfandiari was ranked number one for all-time tournament poker winnings, until Daniel Negreanu took this title by finishing 2nd in the "Big One For One Drop 2014".

In 2012, he authored The Magician's Secrets for Winning Tournaments on Insta Poker, a poker strategy game available for iOS.

== Early life ==
Esfandiari was born in Tehran, Iran. When he was nine years old, his family moved to San Jose, California. He graduated from Del Mar High School in 1997. He then went briefly to jail after he got caught by the police selling marijuana.

At the age of 19, he changed his name to Antonio, which was adopted from a desire to be a magician. Antonio the magician sounded more mystical than Amir the magician. At the same time he also had a nose job done to look less foreign.

He became a professional magician. While he was performing magic, he was invited to a game of Texas Hold 'em and started to play poker. He has a younger brother, Pasha, who also plays poker.

== Personal life ==
Esfandiari married Amal Bounahra in 2014, daughter of Lebanese-Belizean poker pro Badih "Bob" Bounahra. Esfandiari and his wife had a son on January 7, 2015.

== Live poker ==
In 2004, Esfandiari won his first World Series of Poker bracelet in pot-limit Texas Hold 'em. He won close to $1.4 million and his first World Poker Tour title at the L.A. Poker Classic.

Esfandiari appeared in the second and third seasons of the Poker Superstars Invitational Tournament. After finishing last the previous year, Antonio was able to redeem himself with a second-place finish the third season. He was also in each season of GSN series High Stakes Poker and each season of NBC's Poker After Dark.

On April 12, 2008, Esfandiari made the final table at the 2008 PokerStars.com EPT Grand Final in Monte Carlo finishing in eighth place, winning €168,000 ($266,004). On July 14, 2009, Esfandiari made his deepest finish to date in the World Series of Poker Main Event, finishing 24th on day 8 of the tournament, earning $352,832.

In 2010, he won his second World Poker Tour title by winning the WPT Doyle Brunson Five Diamond World for over $870,000. On July 3, 2012, he won the largest buy-in tournament in history, the Big One for One Drop, a $1,000,000 buy-in live event. After beating 47 other players, he earned $18,346,673, the biggest cash prize in poker history. The same year at the 2012 World Series of Poker Europe, Esfandiari won his third bracelet in the €1,100 No Limit Hold'em event, defeating Remi Bollengier heads-up to earn €126,207. In the 2013 World Series of Poker, he placed fourth in the One Drop High Roller tournament, the successor to the Big One that he had won a year earlier, and earned $1,433,438.

As of June 2026, his total live tournament winnings exceed $27.8 million. Esfandiari has been ranked as high as #14 on the Global Poker Index.

On January 10, 2016, Esfandiari was disqualified from the 2016 PokerStars Caribbean Adventure $5,300 Main Event after apparently urinating in a bottle as a result of a prop bet with Bill Perkins.

=== World Series of Poker Bracelets ===
Year	Tournament	Prize (US$/EU€)
2004	$2,000 Pot Limit Hold'em	$184,860
2012	$1,000,000 Big One for One Drop No Limit Hold'em	$18,346,673
2012E	€1,100 No Limit Hold'em	€126,207

An "E" following a year denotes bracelet(s) won at the World Series of Poker Europe

World Poker Tour Titles
Year	Tournament	Prize (US$)
2004	$10,000 L.A. Poker Classic	$1,399,135
2010	$10,000 Doyle Brunson Five Diamond World Poker Classic	$870,124

== Other television appearances ==
Esfandiari co-starred in the TV show I Bet You, on MOJO HD, with Phil Laak. He is the face of World Poker Tour's Poker-Made Millionaire. He was also seen in the season 7 opener of Entourage. In 2012 Esfandiari appeared as an undercover officer in the movie Freelancers starring Robert De Niro and Curtis "50 Cent" Jackson.

In January 2014, Antonio Esfandiari began shooting a web reality series with Ultimate Poker: Strip Magic. The series features Esfandiari performing street magic on the Las Vegas strip along with exclusive interviews. In March 2014, the season one debuted on Youtube.com/UltimatePoker.

In September 2014, Esfandiari paired with fellow poker professional Phil Laak on 'Underground Poker', which aired on the Discovery Channel as part of a three-part mini-series entitled 'All In, All Night'.

== Bibliography ==
- World Poker Tour: In the Money (2006) ISBN 0-06-076305-1
