= Akordet e Kosovës =

Kosovan song contest

- Genre: Various
- Dates: Various
- Location: Kosovo
- Years active: 1963–1989; 2026
- Organiser: Radio Television of Prishtina (1963–1989); Radio Television of Kosovo (RTK) (2026)
- Website: rtklive.com/festivali

Akordet e Kosovës (transl. "Kosovo Chords") is an annual music competition in Kosovo organised by the national broadcaster Radio Television of Kosovo (RTK) from 1963 to 1989 and starting again in 2026. Its revival replaced Festivali i Këngës ne RTK, which aired from 2023 to 2025.

== History ==
Originally named Akordet Muzikore, the contest started in 1963 as a cultural showcase, with the first edition occurring on 24 May 1963. After the contest's last regular occurrence in 1989, attempts to hold it occurred in 1995 and 1996 but were stopped for various reasons.

According to reports beginning in May 2026, the contest was set to be revived, replacing Festivali i Këngës ne RTK. In addition, a corresponding children's subcontest named Akordet për Fëmijë (transl. "Chords for Children") was added, which can double as a national selection should Kosovo become able to enter the Junior Eurovision Song Contest.

== Editions ==
=== 2026 ===
The inaugural edition of the Akordet e Kosovës revival is being held at the 1 Tetori Sports Hall in Pristina. Twenty acts were selected to compete in the adult contest, and fifteen acts were selected to compete in the youth contest. However, only seventeen of the acts competed in the adult contest. Additionally, Dalina Haxhiu's song was originally titled "E kam një ëndërr" in the press release announcing the participants.

Adult Section - 30 and 31 October 2026
R/O		Artist	Song	Songwriter(s)	Result
Show 1	Show 2	Artist	Song	Songwriter(s)	Result
12	5	Algert Sala & Jet	"Gati tu"	Algert Sala	—N/a
9	9	Arbër Krasniqi	"Vjeshtë"	Arbër Krasniqi	—N/a
—N/a	—N/a	Art Lokaj	"Pa Ngjyra"		—N/a
1	17	Besmir Shishko	"Përjetësisht"	Armend Shala; Besmir Shishko	—N/a
15	14	Dea Pasha	"Sërish"	Arben Neziri; Inis Neziri	—N/a
17	1	Fatbardha Nikçi	"Hajde mor i bukur"	Arjola Zadrima; Fatbardha Nikçi; Memli Kelmendi	2nd Place; Orchestra Prize
6	13	Hawolf	"Ti si unë"	Hawolf	3rd Place
16	2	Herva Novaku	"Voilà"	Dario Logallo; Herva Novaku; Mario Spada	—N/a
—N/a	—N/a	Khuba	"Larg"		—N/a
10	10	Miranda Lipovica	"Pranvera"	Miranda Lipovica	—N/a
—N/a	—N/a	Niki Selmanaj	"E lirë"		—N/a
14	4	Olimpia Smajlaj	"Amanet"	Gjergj Kaçinari; Nonejm; Olimpia Smajlaj	"Best Text" Prize
11	8	Rei Bezhani & Martina Serreqi	"2011"	Enis Mullaj	—N/a
8	12	Rinea Vitja	"Histori"	Diell Gashi	—N/a
4	11	Sajana Kodheli	"E lirë"	Arbër Koçllari; Klodian Rexhepaj; Sonia Vokopola	—N/a
2	15	Shpend Lleshi	"Vala"	Rinor Ukimeri; Shpend Lleshi	—N/a
7	6	Sidorela Kelmendi	"Vetëm kam mbetur"	Arbnor Gashi; Sidorela Kelmendi Gashi	—N/a
5	7	Troja Bicurri	"Mali dhe Hana"	Troja Bicurri; Valon Gashi	1st Place
13	3	Urim Salihu	"I njëjti"	Adrian Kastrati; Ilir Berani	—N/a
3	16	Verona Kastrati	"Flakë"	Valon Gashi	—N/a

Youth Section - 1 November 2026
R/O	Artist(s)	Song	Songwriter(s)	Result
1	Shega Krasniqi	"Vajza e okarinave"	Dafina Smajli; Marigo Kelmendi	—N/a
2	Afrona Thaçi & Androna Thaçi	"Për çdo fëmijë"	Besarta Murtezani; Nexhat Mujoviwirus	—N/a
3	Alika Ajeti	"Jemi bota vetë"	Mimoza Neziri-Ajeti; Rinor Ukimeri	—N/a
4	Marin Kerri	"Ëndrrat s’kanë kufij"	Dilan Reka; Jeris Kaso	3rd Place
5	Nuar Llapashtica	"Fitorja akullorja"	Dardan Shkreli; Muhamet Veseli	—N/a
6	Dalina Haxhiu	"Ëndrra ime s’fle"	Dalina Haxhiu; Memli Kelmendi	1st Place
7	Aksa Sylejmani	"Lëshoni Pëllumbat"	Valon Gashi	"Best Text" Prize
8	Afrina Macula	"Superstar"	Afrim Macula; Velrina Macula	—N/a
9	Luana Duli	"Ëndrrat"	Arbnor Gashi	—N/a
10	Blin Tufa	"Magji"	Arbnor Gashi; Sidorela Kelmendi-Gashi	—N/a
11	Aelia Berisha	"Kjo jam unë"	Astrit Stafai	—N/a
12	Rrita Krasniqi	"Soprano"	Avini Krasniqi; Përparim Namani	2nd Place
13	Kenza Pllana	"Buzëqeshi jetës"	Jehona Lumi; Rinor Ukimeri	—N/a
14	Kanarinë Kovanxhiu	"Jam vetvetja"	Hajrullah Syla; Milaim Islami	—N/a
15	Mia Muçaj	"Lartë e më lartë"	Arber Salihu	—N/a
