= Geared Up =

- Presented by: Emery Wells Janna Robinson Steven Smith
- Original language: English

Production
- Production company: MOJO HD

Original release
- Release: December 6, 2006

Geared Up is a television program on MOJO HD (formerly INHD) that showcases the latest in personal technology in 1080i. It is very similar to a former TechTV production called Fresh Gear. Its hosts are Emery Wells, Janna Robinson, and Steven Smith. The show premiered in the United States on December 6, 2006.
