= List of Drinking Made Easy episodes =

Drinking Made Easy is an American pub-crawl reality show that airs on AXS TV. It features Zane Lamprey, Steve McKenna and Marc Ryan (only in Season 1) on a bus tour of United States bars.

== Series overview ==
Seasons	Episodes	Originally aired		DVD release date		
Seasons	Episodes	Season premiere	Season finale	Region 1	Region 2	Region 4
1	24	October 6, 2010	April 13, 2011	—N/a	—N/a	—N/a
2	24	October 5, 2011	April 2, 2012	—N/a	—N/a	—N/a
3	13	October 3, 2012	January 2, 2013	—N/a	—N/a	—N/a

== Episodes ==
=== Season 1: 2010–2011 ===
No. in series	Title	Original release date
1	"Phoenix"	October 6, 2010
The series premiere takes Zane Lamprey to Phoenix, Arizona. He meets an illegal tequila moonshiner, makes a monster margarita and invents the ranch dressing beer-bomb.
2	"Santa Fe"	October 13, 2010
Zane visits Santa Fe, New Mexico, where he meets a master margarita maker, drinks a beer that can kill chickens and eats some of the hottest chili pepper sauce in the state.
3	"Austin"	October 20, 2010
Zane rolls into Austin, Texas, where he infuses vodka with fruit, drinks the hottest bloody mary in town and tries his hand at an Austin tradition, spiking a watermelon.
4	"Dallas"	October 27, 2010
Zane visits Dallas, Texas where he mixes a spicy margarita, tries some of Mama's mixes in a Double Wide and gives his competition the boot at Dallas Cowboy Stadium.
5	"New Orleans"	November 3, 2010
Zane drinks his way through the Big Easy. He suffers a brain freeze at Lafitte's Blacksmith Bar Shop, the oldest bar in the U.S. He tries a Hand Grenade, supposedly the strongest drink in NOLA. Finally he faces down a Hurricane at the world-famous Pat O'Brien's.
6	"Florida"	November 10, 2010
Zane hits Miami Beach, Florida, where it's time for some fun in the sun. He makes 40 mojitos in a minute at Lario's on the Beach, taps a cask of ale at premier beer bar Red Light Red Light and tries to cool off with liquid nitrogen at the Ritz-Carlton, South Beach.
7	"Atlanta"	November 17, 2010
Zane visits Atlanta, Georgia, where he gets a personalized beer tap, finds out what 420 is all about and meets a backwoods moonshiner. It's Drinking Made Easy, Atlanta.
8	"Virginia"	November 24, 2010
Zane heads to Virginia. He downs an Orange Crush at Waterman's Surfside Grille, a Virginia Pony and a Wasabi Martini at Empire Little Bar Bistro, and a Patrick Henry at where else but Patrick Henry's Pub And Grille!
9	"Philadelphia"	December 1, 2010
Host Zane Lamprey travels to Philadelphia, where he drinks beer from Presidential recipes, visits the oldest bar in the city, and discovers the temple shot.
10	"New York City"	December 8, 2010
Zane Lamprey visits the Big Apple. He drinks at one of the city's oldest bars, the longest bar, and a bar that's location is a secret.
11	"Boston"	December 15, 2010
Zane Lamprey visits Bean Town. He tries beer that's brewed with fruit, drinks mead, and has a beer where everybody knows your name.
12	"Chicago"	December 22, 2010
Zane visits Al Capone's own Windy City. He drinks a 'French 75' at the Green Door Tavern, has a $200 Cloud Gate Martini at Tavern At The Park, and an Apricot Margarita at Chicago's most intimate bar, The Matchbox.
13	"Milwaukee"	December 29, 2010
Zane hits up 'Beertown' He goes to 'The Bomb Shelter' where he downs Turkey Gizzard Shots, sips a 'Pink Squirrel' at Bryant's and nails some strikes in America's oldest bowling alley at Holler House. He finishes up by 'Closing Wolski's'.
14	"St. Louis"	January 12, 2011
Zane visits the 'Gateway to the West'. He drinks at the Famous Bar on Route 66, Chuck Berry's hangout 'Blueberry Hill' and tests his vodka knowledge at Sub Zero Vodka Bar. He tops it off at St Louis' first dessert bar called Bailey's Chocolate Bar, with a Hot Chocolate Martini and a Cinnamon Stout Shake.
15	"Kansas City"	January 19, 2011
Zane Lamprey visits the Paris of the Plains. He tries edible cocktails, meets the creator of the Bergin Malt and squares off in a Kansas City BBQ eating challenge.
16	"Denver"	January 26, 2011
Zane Lamprey visits the Mile High City. He visits the home of Fat Tire, hits his limit at Rio Grande, and watches his buddy Steve compete in a bull ball eating contest.
17	"Salt Lake City"	February 2, 2011
Zane Lamprey visits the SLC. He visits Utah's oldest bar, dispels the myths about drinking in Utah, and learns the difference between vodka and whiskey.
18	"Boise"	February 9, 2011
Zane Lamprey visits B-Town. He has a 10-minute martini, visits a micro-distillery, and challenges Steve to a French fry eating contest in the back of a car.
19	"Portland"	February 16, 2011
Zane Lamprey visit's Rose-City. He drinks at a converted elementary school, has an avocado margarita, and drinks in the city's oldest restaurant.
20	"Napa"	February 23, 2011
Zane Lamprey heads to wine country. He makes fresh Limoncello, visits Rubicon Estates to meet with a Master Sommelier, and has a grape leaf eating contest with Steve.
21	"San Francisco"	March 2, 2011
Zane Lamprey visits the City by the Bay. He meets with Fritz Maytag, who lead the craft beer revolution, drinks Fernet Branca upside down, and drinks on a mobile island.
22	"Las Vegas"	March 9, 2011
Zane Lamprey visits Sin City. He drinks a bacon martini, eats deep-fried Oreos at Aces & Ales, and hits the tables in Planet Hollywood.
23	"San Diego"	April 6, 2011
Zane Lamprey visits San Diego. He drinks at Noble Experiment, a hidden speakeasy, drinks schooners or beer at the Shore Club, and hangs out with an Arrogant Bastard.
24	"Los Angeles"	April 13, 2011
In the final episode of season one, Zane returns home to Los Angeles. He drinks out of fruit at Paradise Cove, takes a flight at Blue Palms Brew House and stops by Musso & Franks, a Hollywood institution.

=== Season 2: 2011–2012 ===
No. overall	No. in season	Title	Original release date
25	1	"Maui"	October 5, 2011
In this season 2 premiere, Zane Lamprey visits Maui, Hawaii. On his travels, he visits laid back atmospheres and beach paradise. Zane and Steve travel along the sandy path to find who is doing the best mixing, brewing, and hallucinating in this island paradise.
26	2	"Kauai"	October 12, 2011
For a 6-million-year-old island that’s home to one of the rainiest areas in the world and thousands of wild chickens, Kauai is anything but chaotic. Hawaii’s most green island is adorned with tourists and locals looking for the best ways to wind down and there’s no better place on the island to listen to the rainfall, then under the roof of one of the many local bars, pubs or watering holes. In this episode, Zane dives into the Pacific for some reef snorkeling, learns about the aphrodisiac benefits of honey mead, and mixes up some classic Hawaiian cocktails with some of Kauai’s best bartenders.
27	3	"Monterey"	October 19, 2011
California’s “first city” might seem like a sleepy and quaint little oceanside town, but Monterey, California knows how to party. Located on the California coast smack dab in the middle of the state, Monterey isn’t just known for its historic buildings and world-class aquarium. From Alvarado Street, with the densest collection of bars and pubs in the area, to the many vineyards along the outskirts of town, you won’t have to wander far to find a drink.
28	4	"Key West"	October 26, 2011
Located on the southernmost tip of the continental United States, Key West is the heart and soul of the Florida Keys. Its Caribbean vibe, year round sunshine, laid back lifestyle and Bahamian and Cuban influences help make Key West what is today: a great place for a tropical liquor-inspired vacation. At only 4 miles long and 2 miles wide, it was made for pub-crawling. From its proximity to some of the best rums in the world, to its lax open container laws and the abundance of bars and restaurants on the world famous Duval Street, Key West couldn’t be an easier place to drink.
29	5	"Miami"	October 31, 2011
Zane and Steve start the morning with fresh fruit for a 500-person brunch. They whip up some "adult" milkshakes. And they take a boat to Virginia key to shotgun beer with a squatter.
30	6	"Tampa"	November 7, 2011
Zane visits Tampa, Florida, where he visits Cigar City Brewing, stops by the first Hooters location for an "Orange Shorts Margarita" and Steve McKenna's special take on the "orange shorts" part, samples the "Bloody Gazpacho" at Columbia Restaurant Ybor City, and sips on a "Blue Blazer" at Mandarin Hide.
31	7	"St. Augustine"	November 14, 2011
We venture to our country's oldest city, visit an 18th century tavern, board a pirate ship, and do some native hunting. Then, we try to clean it all up with a drink from the Fountain of Youth. It's Drinking Made Easy, St. Augustine.
32	8	"Savannah"	November 21, 2011
Zane and Steve stroll through the southern streets in the historic town of Savannah. They cure bad hangovers with some early morning mint juleps, consume pink eggs, and visit some alligators. Then Zane challenges Steve to a duel, in the "gentlemanly" sport of fencing.
33	9	"Washington, D.C."	November 28, 2011
Zane and Steve explore our nation's capitol. They start with a shoot off challenge, sample some controversial drinks, and take in some art. Then, they learn to make DC's official cocktail.
34	10	"Baltimore"	December 5, 2011
Zane and Steve head out to an apple farm to learn about hard apple cider. They visit a museum where sampling a flight of cocktails is a lunch-time activity, learn about the controversy surrounding Flying Dog Brewery, apply for the Jack Daniels Club, and make a bad decision.
35	11	"Newport, RI"	December 12, 2011
Zane and Steve explore the historic city of Newport, Rhode Island and learn about rum running and local brews in this episode of Drinking Made Easy. Newport is home to one of the highest collections of surviving colonial buildings and is also known for its illustrious mansions, shopping, and scenery. But Zane and Steve are here for the booze. Though they will be able to partake in a lovely game of tennis, the drunken duo will be focused on sipping local brews and enjoying local drinking customs including the first ever Drinking Made Easy Beergatta Race!
36	12	"Cape Cod"	December 17, 2011
Zane and Steve vacation on the maritime beaches of Cape Cod. They find a way to take lighthouses home, jump into some Goombay Smash, and turn a beer warehouse into an Olympic stadium.
37	13	"Portland, ME"	December 26, 2011
Drinking Made Easy heads to Maine's largest city, Portland. As always they will explore the best drinks of the area as well as visit some unique breweries and fermentories that make use of rich local ingredients and employ unique strategies the making of their beverages. This cozy water-front city has a large amount of local influences in their beers, their bars, and the cocktails.
38	14	"Memphis"	January 2, 2012
Zane and Steve check out the birthplace of Rock and Roll. They make their own version of notorious "purple sizzurp" with some locals. They make a cocktail in honor of Elvis, brew some beer with rocks, and march ducks down an elevator.
39	15	"Nashville"	January 9, 2012
Zane and Steve check in to Music City: Nashville, Tennessee. They start their day off with a liter beer race, visit a modern moonshine distillery, and put their whiskey knowledge to the test. They learn to carbonate their own cocktails, and then join a roller derby team for a race around the rink.
40	16	"Asheville, NC"	January 16, 2012
Zane visits the gateway to the West. He takes the vodka-challenge, indulges his sweet tooth with a hot chocolate martini and tries a signature beer cocktail.
41	17	"Charlotte, NC"	January 23, 2012
Zane and Steve visit the largest city in the Carolinas. They befriend a drifter named Nathaniel and decide to drink 40 oz. beers stolen from a gas station. The boys then head to Ray's Rib Shack where they indulge in drinking fermented emu urine.
42	18	"Charleston, SC"	January 30, 2012
Charleston, South Carolina is known for its good manners and for its historic architecture which is why many describe the city as a ‘Living Museum’. Zane and Steve get to check out some of the fine drinking establishments and taste breakfast drinks, fizzy gin drinks, classical drinks, and even some drinks chilled to −320 degrees.
43	19	"Seattle, WA"	February 6, 2012
Seattle is the largest city in the Pacific Northwest and is commonly known as The Emerald City for its lush green landscape. Due to its size, Seattle has a number of different districts, each offering up its own distinct style and culture. In this episode, Zane and Steve will speak with the “Godfather of Micro-Brewing Industry”, Charles Finkel, as well as explore Seattle’s many different bars to get a taste of their different styles…literally.
44	20	"Vancouver"	February 13, 2012
Zane and Steve jump the border for Canada to tour the city of Vancouver, which is the largest metropolitan area in western Canada. They’ll taste local beers, local wines, and some local cocktails while also experiencing the cities different districts like Gastown. The drunken duo will also refine their taste with an elegant wine, cheese, and meat pairing dinner…then bring it back down again for some creative cocktails and booze.
45	21	"Spokane, WA"	February 20, 2012
Spokane is an area of immense beauty and tasty libations, where many of the local establishments rely on homegrown local ingredients. Fresh and natural creations are abundant in these parts and Zane and Steve plan to taste as much as they can. The boys will hit up some local breweries and distilleries as well as some local bars that speak to the spirit of Spokane. Then they forget all that and shoot each other with paintball guns and Zane pours a two story shot for Steve…fun stuff, can’t miss it!
46	22	"Missoula, MT"	February 27, 2012
Join Zane and Steve as they tackle ‘Big Sky’ Country in beautiful Missoula, Montana. Montana is the 4th largest state in the US and gets its Big Sky nickname for having flat, wide open landscapes, allowing one to see all horizons. Now that is all find and dandy, but Drinking Made Easy is here for one thing: Booze. Luckily, Missoula is fit to deliver with plenty of local bars, breweries, and fun “Montana Style” establishments.
47	23	"Santa Barbara, CA"	March 5, 2012
Santa Barbara is known for its beautiful landscapes, unbeatable weather and spectacular coastline which has made it an ideal environment for vineyards. California is the 4th largest wine producer in the world behind France, Italy, and Spain; with much of its wine coming straight from Santa Barbara. In this episode the guys will explore the local wineries and vineyards and even crush some of their own wine grapes. They then will pay their respects to the many local taverns, brewhouses, and restaurants that reflect Santa Barbara’s unique culture.
48	24	"Aspen, CO"	April 2, 2012
Aspen is an illustrious ski resort located within the Rocky Mountains of Colorado and is often visited for its simple luxury, beautiful scenery, and great slopes. Aspen is known as a prominent winter vacation spot for many celebrities and high-society, and now it is getting a visit from Zane Lamprey and Mr. Dumbbeard, Steve McKenna. We hope Aspen is ready, because Drinking Made Easy is coming to hit the slopes, hit the bars, and see what Aspen has too offer!

=== Season 3: 2012–2013 ===
No. overall	No. in season	Title	Original release date
49	1	"Houston, TX"	October 3, 2012
Drinking Made Easy is back and to kick things off we start in Houston, the largest city in Texas and fourth largest in the United States. Zane Lamprey and Steve McKenna will visit Texas’ oldest craft brewery, Saint Arnold Brewing Company, and check out some great mixology, dive, and party bars. The boys also get down and dirty with some pig scramblin’ and attempt a world record for the fastest firkin race.
50	2	"San Antonio, TX"	October 10, 2012
Well, yeeehaaww! The boys are drinking up in Alamo City this week as they visit San Antonio, Texas. Things get a little bit country as Zane Lamprey and Wyatt Burp, travel the city’s hot spots and saloons. Aside from great beer and awesome cocktails, there is also a heated competition brewing between Zane and Steve where they will each attempt to tame a raging bull for our Bull Riding 6-Pack Challenge! Ok, the bull is fake, but it is for the bulls protection, we don’t allow Steve near live animals.
51	3	"Baton Rouge, LA"	October 17, 2012
The boys travel down to the bayou in Louisiana for Drinking Made Easy: Baton Rouge. They visit Tin Roof Brewing Company and participate in the new hip thing, Stacked Beer Shotgunning. They also create their own beer recipes at The Chimes; sort some crawfish and dance the Fais Do Do at Sammy’s, do some voodoo at Boudreaux & Thibodeaux, and get a little wild at Fred’s.
52	4	"Louisville, KY"	October 24, 2012
Zane and Steve head down to bourbon county in Louisville, Kentucky to learn more about America’s official spirit and this great southern city. We turn Steve into a proper southern gentleman and then make him less and less proper by tasting a whole lot of bourbon as we crawl a bunch of great bourbon bars.
53	5	"Indianapolis, IN"	October 31, 2012
Drinking Made Easy heads to Indianapolis to taste the local flavor and explore distilleries, breweries, and some historic bars dating back to the 19th century. They also get a chance to visit the Indianapolis Motor Speedway to take a ride AND work on a million dollar car. Lots of great bars, cool drinks, and fun times ahead.
54	6	"Anchorage, AK"	November 7, 2012
Drinking Made Easy heads way up north to Anchorage, Alaska to explore drinking in America’s largest state (yes, it is bigger than Texas). Zane and Steve drink vodka on the Kachemak Bay with real glacier ice, taste some exceptional meads and beer, and hit up the local bars that are full of history and great drinks.
55	7	"Juneau, AK"	November 14, 2012
Drinking Made Easy continues its trek through the Alaska’s great wilderness and stops in Juneau in search of some great bars and beverages. Zane and Steve visit some of Alaska’s great historic places like the Alaska Hotel and Red Dog Saloon. The boys also fly and hike up to a glacier wall to do a bit of ice climbing.
56	8	"Quebec City, Quebec, CAN"	November 19, 2012
Zane and Steve freshen up on their french as they venture to Quebec, Canada to explore what they have to offer the areas of beer, liquor, and nightlife. They will embrace the rich culture, see the sites, frolic in the countryside and enjoy the many great libations Quebec has to offer. Also, in the episode, Steve is Mime! Not a very good one, but at least he can’t say anything dumb, though somehow he still gets his points across.
57	9	"Montreal, Quebec, CAN"	November 27, 2012
Drinking Made Easy finishes up its tour of Canada in Montreal where they experiment with some zesty mixology and experience a whole lot of Canadian craft beer. Steve dresses up as a hockey player but still manages to throw them back with his huge gloves. Steve also decides to challenge Zane at Champagne Bottle Sabering even though Zane holds the world record.
58	10	"Burlington, VT"	December 5, 2012
Drinking Made Easy heads to the state with most breweries per-capita as they visit Burlington, Vermont. In addition to visiting multiple breweries like Magic Hat and Switchback, Zane Lamprey and Steve Mckenna will also learn about bitters, infusion, and Burlington’s bar scene. There is a wide spectrum of drinking knowledge in this episode, from craft cocktails, craft beer, and craft…shots and bombs.
59	11	"Providence, RI"	December 12, 2012
Drinking Made Easy heads to Providence, Rhode Island where Zane Lamprey and Steve McKenna will imbibe in many a beer and cocktail. Along with exploring the rich history of Rhode Island’s largest city, the guys will also be stepping up the competitiveness with straw challenges, food challenges, and another specialty cocktail competition.
60	12	"Montauk, NY"	December 19, 2012
The guys head up to Long Island through the Hamptons to Montauk to drink at the most eastern end of New York state. The guys will visit wineries, breweries, and some cool bars with original drink creations. We try to pass Steve off as a respectable doctor and he even gets a chance to produce! This episode also holds the record for the most straw races in Drinking Made Easy history! Needless to say, doctor McKenna gets very McKenna’d.
61	13	"Downtown L.A., CA"	January 2, 2013
On the season finale of Drinking Made Easy season 3, the guys head to downtown Los Angeles to find explore some secret bars, breweries, and even wineries! We dive deep into the Downtown underground to find some awesome speak easy bars as well as historic establishments that have survived the test of time to provide some great drinks. We also wrap up things up by announcing the winner of the 6-pack challenge for the season. For the first time, the boys are tied at the season’s end so who ever wins the next match wins the season!
