= Three Sheets to Belgium =

- Three Sheets episode
- Episode no.: Season 1 Episode 1

Episode chronology
← Previous —	Next → "Three Sheets to Costa Rica"

"Three Sheets to Belgium" is the first episode of the television show Three Sheets. It originally aired on June 18, 2006.

== Synopsis ==
Comedian and host Zane Lamprey begins his beer tour in the capital city of Belgium, Brussels. Zane claims that you should never drink on an empty stomach so he ventures to meet "Terry" at Chez Léon, a local restaurant famous for serving the national dish of mussels and fries. When Zane goes to the bar to order a beer, he notes that the bartender scraped the foam off the top of the glass after he was done pouring. Belgians believe that this releases the bouquet of the beer and makes drinking it more enjoyable. He takes his beer over to a table to eat lunch with Terry. Zane tries to toast their meal and finds out the word for "cheers" in Belgium is "gesundheit", the same word Americans use when someone sneezes.

Zane's next stop is a café called "À la Mort Subite", which translates to "Sudden Death". Inside, Zane meets "Bart the Bartender" who serves beer to customers and oftentimes drinks with them too. At one point he says it is not unusual for him to consume 20 beers in one day. Bart introduces Zane to a game called 421. It is played by rolling three die and trying to get the combination of 4, 2 and 1 among the three. One person gets three tries to get the combo before letting someone else try. The person who ends up getting 421 wins the game and the loser has to buy the round of beers. Zane ends up losing to Bart and buys a round of apple-flavored beer for the two of them. He states that fruit flavored beer is so common to Belgium because beer is so common to Belgium and they want a beer to fit everyone's tastes.

The final bar on Zane's drinking excursion is the Delirium Café. The café is famous because it contains the largest selection of beer at one bar in the world with the number currently topping 2,600. Zane tries to toast with Francois the bartender by saying Gezondheid but discovers that there are two official languages of Belgium: Flemish and French. Francois encourages him to use "Santé", the French word for cheers. The beer they are drinking is non-filtered, giving it a cloudy appearance, and triple fermented, making the alcohol content about 8.5 percent. By contrast, American beers are usually only fermented a single time and contain about 4 or 5 percent alcohol. The next beer they sample is another apple beer but with an extra kick of flaming apple schnapps. Francois explains that the fruity beers only have an alcohol content of 2.5 percent so the shot is used for more potency and flavor in the beer. The shot increases the alcohol content to 6 or 7 percent.

Francois and Zane take a break from drinking beer after that to try some Brussels sprout flavored liquor. It seems to be gin infused with Brussels sprouts and was not to Zane's taste.

The next beer is made by monks and can only be found in Belgium. This "mystery beer" could not be shown on camera and can only be acquired a case at a time. The show then breaks from the Delirium cafe to the Orval monastery where Orval beer is brewed. Father Dennis is a trappist monk who presides over the monastery and explains that Orval means "Golden Valley" and that the profits from the beer mostly go to people and charities. Zane goes inside the brewery and explains that Orval beer is flavored with giant tea bags full of hops. He meets a "beer engineer" who is in charge of checking the color and the alcohol content of the beer. Orval is about 6.7 percent alcohol.

The show flashes back to the Delirium Café where Zane says that trappist beers are non-pasteurized so they contain active yeast which keeps the beer fermenting. For this kind of beer, it is important not to drink the entire bottle. The yeast will settle to the bottom while the drinkable piece remains on top. As a result of the constant fermentation, Zane ends up drinking a beer with 11.3 percent alcohol. He goes on to say that most American beers are clearer and milder than the beer brewed in Belgium. It is at this time that Logan the "Beer Hunter" makes his appearance. He explains that he has been on the road for nearly a year sampling beers across the U.S. and Europe. He then proceeds to spend the rest of his time on camera stealing samples of Zane's beer and talking profusely.

An important staple of the show is introduced in this first episode by Francois. He says that it is a German tradition to make a sign with your hand after someone burps while drinking. The sign consists of your thumb touching your forehead while your pinky points skyward and your other fingers are curled in toward your palm. The sign means "good burp" and it has been used in all seasons including the newest episodes.

The last few beers that Zane samples at the Delirium Café are fruit flavored beers. He first tries those flavored mainly with sugar including chocolate, strawberry, and cactus, which Zane says tastes like "window cleaner". His time ends with a beer flavored purely with cherries and not sugar. The taste makes him gag and he leaves the café in a drunken stupor.

== The Hangover Cure ==
The show ends with a trip to "Le Chocolatier Manon" so that Zane may try to cure his hangover with Belgian chocolate. The chocolatier is a third generation at Manon Chocolates in Brussels and takes Zane through the process of making world-famous chocolate. It needs to be cooled to 32 degrees Celsius before molding so Zane takes a crack at folding the chocolate until its ready. The entire process, including the temperature readings and molding, is done by hand. The show ends with a recap of the trip and Zane's claim that the chocolate cured his hangover.

Episode cost: 180k Host cost: 51k per episode

== Trivia ==
- The population density of Belgium is so dense that the night city glow can be seen from space
- French fries were invented in Belgium and not France
- There are over 200 fruit flavored beers made in Belgium
- There are three official languages of Belgium: Dutch, French and German
- The Orval Brewery is one of only six trappist breweries in the world
- Orval can be found the U.S. for about five dollars a bottle

== See also ==
- Three Sheets
