= List of Three Sheets episodes =

This is a list of episodes for the television series Three Sheets.

The following is an episode list for Three Sheets, an international travelogue/pub-crawl television series. The show began June 18, 2006 on MOJO HD and aired for three seasons. The fourth season aired on FLN. As of early 2010, FLN continues to air rerun episodes from all four seasons.

== Series overview ==
Season	Episodes	Originally released	
Season	Episodes	First released	Last released
1	8	June 18, 2006	August 6, 2006
2	11	March 14, 2007	December 31, 2007
3	15	April 10, 2008	December 31, 2008
4	18	July 20, 2009	December 7, 2009

== Episodes ==
=== Season 1 (2006) ===
No. overall	No. in season	Title	Original release date
1	1	"Three Sheets to Belgium"	June 18, 2006
2	2	"Three Sheets to Costa Rica"	June 25, 2006
3	3	"Three Sheets to Wales"	July 2, 2006
4	4	"Three Sheets to Champagne"	July 9, 2006
5	5	"Three Sheets to Jamaica"	July 16, 2006
6	6	"Three Sheets to Ireland"	July 23, 2006
7	7	"Three Sheets to Tequila, Mexico"	July 30, 2006
8	8	"Three Sheets to Belize"	August 6, 2006

=== Season 2 (2007) ===
No. overall	No. in season	Title	Original release date
9	1	"Three Sheets to Croatia"	March 14, 2007
10	2	"Three Sheets to Japan"	March 21, 2007
11	3	"Three Sheets to Czech Republic"	March 28, 2007
12	4	"Three Sheets to Philippines"	April 4, 2007
13	5	"Three Sheets to Venice"	April 11, 2007
14	6	"Three Sheets to Taipei"	April 18, 2007
15	7	"Three Sheets to Munich"	April 25, 2007
16	8	"Three Sheets to Puerto Rico"	May 2, 2007
17	9	"Three Sheets to South Korea"	May 9, 2007
18	10	"Three Sheets to Kentucky"	May 16, 2007
19	11	"NY Pub Crawl"	December 31, 2007

=== Season 3 (2008) ===
No. overall	No. in season	Title	Original release date
20	1	"Three Sheets to Chile"	April 10, 2008
21	2	"Three Sheets to Rio de Janeiro"	April 17, 2008
22	3	"Three Sheets to Portugal"	April 24, 2008
23	4	"Three Sheets to Hong Kong"	May 1, 2008
24	5	"Three Sheets to Las Vegas"	May 8, 2008
25	6	"Three Sheets to Gibraltar"	May 15, 2008
26	7	"Three Sheets to Denmark"	May 22, 2008
27	8	"Three Sheets to Saigon"	May 29, 2008
28	9	"Three Sheets to Scotland"	June 5, 2008
29	10	"Three Sheets to Barcelona"	June 12, 2008
30	11	"Three Sheets to Cognac"	June 19, 2008
31	12	"Three Sheets to Bangkok"	June 26, 2008
32	13	"Three Sheets to Argentina"	July 3, 2008
33	14	"Three Sheets to Moscow"	July 10, 2008
34	15	"New Years Eve Special: London Pub Crawl Webisode"	December 31, 2008

=== Season 4 (2009) ===
No. overall	No. in season	Title	Original release date
35	1	"Three Sheets to New Zealand"	July 20, 2009
36	2	"Three Sheets to Tanzania"	July 27, 2009
37	3	"Three Sheets to Lithuania"	August 3, 2009
38	4	"Three Sheets to St. Martin"	August 10, 2009
39	5	"Three Sheets to Cape Town"	August 24, 2009
40	6	"Three Sheets to Tuscany"	September 14, 2009
41	7	"Three Sheets to Hawaii"	September 21, 2009
42	8	"Three Sheets to Poland"	September 28, 2009
43	9	"Three Sheets to Namibia"	October 5, 2009
44	10	"Three Sheets to Hamburg"	October 12, 2009
45	11	"Three Sheets to Barbados"	October 19, 2009
46	12	"Three Sheets to Newcastle"	October 26, 2009
47	13	"Three Sheets to Lesbos"	November 2, 2009
48	14	"Three Sheets to Iceland"	November 9, 2009
49	15	"Three Sheets to Tahiti"	November 16, 2009
50	16	"Three Sheets to Whistler, Canada"	November 23, 2009
51	17	"Three Sheets to Panama"	November 30, 2009
52	18	"Three Sheets to Amsterdam"	December 7, 2009
