= Wall Street Warriors =

American television series

Wall Street Warriors is a documentary and reality TV series that details the lives of various Wall Street entrepreneurs. A Mojo HD channel original series, each episode is 30 minutes long and shot in high definition video. The series ran for three seasons between 2006 and 2009. MOJO HD closed down its programming in December 2008, but completed series 3 which was sold to other networks and issued on DVD.

== Production ==
The first season of Wall Street Warriors aired on October 22, 2006, on INHD (later called Mojo HD). Sean Skelton and Scott Gill produced the show. Wall Street Warriors starred the 25-year-old hedge fund manager Timothy Sykes. Nielson did not rate the show or the Mojo channel.

== Reception ==
Alana Semuels of the Los Angeles Times wrote that in the midst of the 2008 financial crisis, the television series was "good drama, yes, but it may not appeal to viewers already reeling from losses to their pension plans and stock market accounts".

== Featured Wall Streeters ==
Season One began airing in October 2006 and had six episodes. It featured the following people:

Warrior	Nickname
Timothy Sykes	The Start-Up
Alex Gerchik	The Day Trader
Sandra Navidi	The Deal Maker
Parker Quillen	The Portfolio Manager
Jill DiLosa	The Analyst
Guy De Chimay	The Fund Manager
Bob Nunn	The Specialist

Season Two began airing in January 2008 and had ten episodes. It featured the following people:

Warrior	Nickname
Laetitia Vaval	The Rookie
Jessica Pearson	The Options Broker
Brett Hickey	The Fund Manager
James Ayers	The Stockbroker
Lance Cooley	The Hard Sell
Larry Alintoff	The Floor Trader

Season 3 was released in 2009 and had 10 episodes. It featured the following people:

Warrior	Nickname
Tony	The Options Trader
Richard	The Money
Phillip	The Brokers

== List of episodes ==
=== Season 1 ===
No.	Title	Original release date
1	"Capitalism Rules"	October 22, 2006
2	"Closing the Deal"	October 29, 2006
3	"From Robes To Riches"	November 5, 2006
4	"Work Hard, Play Harder"	November 12, 2006
5	"Written in the Stars"	November 19, 2006
6	"Size Does Matter"	November 26, 2006

=== Season 2 ===
No.	Title	Original release date
1	"Up on Futures"	January 24, 2008
2	"Holding Patterns"	January 31, 2008
3	"The Hate Index"	February 7, 2008
4	"The Spread"	February 14, 2008
5	"The Open Outcry"	February 21, 2008
6	"Downside Up"	February 28, 2008
7	"The Squeeze"	March 6, 2008
8	"Distance Indicators"	March 13, 2008
9	"Bulls, Bears and Whales"	March 20, 2008
10	"Survivors Algorithm"	March 27, 2008

=== Season 3 ===
No.	Title
1	"Enter the Bears"
2	"The Fear Gauge"
3	"The Strangle"
4	"Volatile, Volatility"
5	"Options, Options"
6	"Between the Trades"
7	"Meltdown"
8	"The Fallout"
9	"The Beatdown"
10	"The Final Bell"
