= RTK 4 =

Kosovar public TV channel

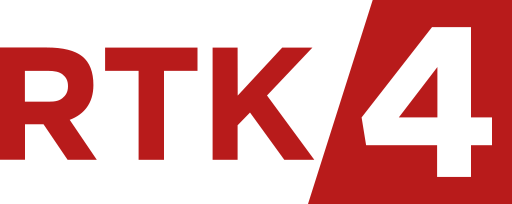
- Country: Kosovo
- Broadcast area: Kosovo
- Headquarters: Pristina, Kosovo

Programming
- Language(s): Albanian
- Picture format: 576i (SDTV 16:9); 1080i (HDTV 16:9)

Ownership
- Owner: RTK
- Key people: Rilind Gërvalla (director)
- Sister channels: RTK 1; RTK 2; RTK 3

History
- Launched: 13 March 2014

Links
- Website: RTK Website

Availability

Streaming media
- RTK 4: RTK 4 Live

RTK 4 (English: Radio Television of Kosovo 4, Albanian: Radio Televizioni i Kosovës 4) is the fourth public television channel of Kosovo. RTK 4 is part of the Radio Television of Kosovo (RTK), a public service broadcaster, along with the other public channels, RTK 1, RTK 2, and RTK 3. Its primary programming is documentaries, films, and locally-produced series.

== About ==
After the launch of the second public channel, RTK 4 was launched in March 2014, as an arts and documentaries channel for the Kosovar viewers. RTK 4 was launched along with the third channel, RTK 3, on behalf of the EBU officials. The European Broadcasting Union also helped and funded the launch of the 2 new channels.
