= E! Hollywood Hold'em =

- Also known as: Hollywood Poker Night
- Genre: Game show
- Presented by: Phil Laak
- Country of origin: United States
- Original language: English
- No. of seasons: 1
- No. of episodes: 6

Production
- Production company: Flutie Entertainment

Original release
- Network: E!
- Release: March 17 – April 21, 2005

E! Hollywood Hold'em is a poker television program. It aired in 2005 on the E! television network. The show featured young celebrities (including co-executive producer Laura Prepon and brothers Chris and Danny Masterson) hosting single table Texas hold em tournaments at their homes. The winner of each tournament pocketed $10,000. Professional poker player Phil Laak served as host and dealer, offering occasional tips to the players and home viewers.
