= Drinking Made Easy =

- Starring: Zane Lamprey
- Country of origin: United States
- No. of seasons: 3
- No. of episodes: 61 (list of episodes)

Production
- Editors: Travis Ford; Eric Grabowski
- Running time: Approx. 30m

Original release
- Network: AXS TV
- Release: October 6, 2010 – December 26, 2012

Drinking Made Easy is a pub-crawl television series that premiered in 2010 and airs on AXS TV in the United States. Comedian Zane Lamprey hosts a humorous bus trip around the United States and Canada, exploring the local drinking culture of various cities in the countries. In each episode, Lamprey samples popular or original cocktails and beers from bars and breweries in the area.

Season two premiered with an hour long episode on October 5, 2011, on HDNet.

== Format ==
Each episode begins with an overview of the highlights of the episode. Throughout the show Zane and his friend Steve McKenna visit popular bars, breweries, and distilleries where they sample different offerings from the establishments. At bars, Zane is typically behind the bar interviewing the bartender, as well as making cocktails with the help of the bartender. At some point during the episode, McKenna (and sometimes Lamprey) will engage in an eating challenge where he attempts to eat a large portion of a signature dish from a restaurant in the area. Sometimes McKenna is trying to set a record at the restaurant, othertimes he and Zane are racing to finish first or eat the most.

Another segment found only in season one is an interview led by Marc Ryan. He typically visits a brewery or distillery on his own, and tries to learn the history and story of the business, as well as sample what they produce.

Zane and Steve hold a competition in each episode called the "Six Six-Pack Challenge" where Lamprey and McKenna face off in some sort of game and bet each other six six-packs on the outcome. The games are usually inspired by the location of the episode or the bars they visit.

== Cast ==
- Zane Lamprey: Host.
- Steve McKenna: Sidekick to Zane Lamprey. He typically accompanies him to all of the bars and breweries, tries the drinks Zane mixes, and participates in the food challenge(season 1 only) and six six-pack challenge.
- Marc Ryan: Correspondent who does his own interviews. Only in season one.
- Wes DuBois: Wears the Pleepleus costume in each episode.

== Drinking game rules ==
The show also doubles as a drinking game, introduced after the first commercial break in each episode. The rules are as follows:

1. The first person to see Pleepleus in a shot can make someone else drink.
2. The first person to notice a continuity error can make someone else drink.
3. Whenever Zane and Steve compete during the show, pick a side. If you lose, you drink.
4. When Zane burps, the last person to make the "Good Burp" sign (putting your thumb to your forehead) has to drink.
5. When Marc touches someone the first person to say "touché" can make someone else drink.

== Eating Challenges (Only in Season 1) ==
In each episode Zane challenges Steve to an eating contest. This usually involves Steve trying to finish a restaurant's specialty or Zane racing Steve to eat the most of a certain food. The eating challenges were discontinued after the first season. Zane said the reason for this was because he had always won them, which made it unfair for Steve.

Episode	Location	Challenge	Result
S01E01	Phoenix	Steve has to eat a 5 pounds of Tater Tots in an hour at Chuey's Mini Bar.	Not clear
S01E02	Santa Fe	Steve takes the Fireman's 10 LB Burrito Challenge: a burrito with 10 eggs, 2 lbs potatoes, 0.5 lbs bacon, 0.5 lbs sausage, 0.5 lbs pork, 0.5 lbs beans, 0.5 lbs red chile, 0.5 lbs green chile, 0.5 lbs cheese, and 3 tortillas at Cecilia's Cafe.	Fail
S01E03	Austin	Steve tries to break the restaurant record of 9 breakfast burritos at Juan in a Million.	Fail (6.5 burritos)
S01E04	Dallas	Steve has to eat 10 lbs chicken fried steak with 5 lbs of potatoes at the Cowtown Diner.	Fail
S01E05	New Orleans	Steve and Zane race to see who can eat 100 Cajun spiced crawfish first at Tony Moran's.	Zane (100-79)
S01E06	Florida	Steve has to eat the "Kitchen Sink" (4 heaping scoops of ice cream, covered in multiple syrups, whipped cream, bananas, nuts, and maraschino cherries) at Jaxson's Ice Cream Parlor.	Fail
S01E07	Atlanta	Steve tries to break the restaurant record of 14 peach cobblers at Gladys Knight & Ron Winans Chicken & Waffles	Fail (9 peach cobblers)
S01E08	Virginia	Steve tries to eat eight Stupid Wings at Caliente.	Fail
S01E09	Philadelphia	No eating challenge.	-
S01E10	New York	Zane tries to eat 30 oysters and drink a pint of Guinness in two minutes at Tracks.	Success (1:05)
S01E11	Boston	Steve tries to eat two quarts of Clam Chowder.	Success
S01E12	Chicago	Steve and Zane race to finish a deep dish pizza at Giordano's.	Zane
S01E13	Milwaukee	Steve and Zane challenge each other to eat the most scorpions at Bad Genie.	Zane
S01E14	St. Louis	Steve and Zane race to eat the most fried ravioli in twenty minutes at Blueberry Hill.	Zane (26-22)
S01E15	Kansas City	Steve, Wes and Zane race to eat three BAR-B-Q Sundaes (6 oz pork, 5 oz coleslaw, 6.5 oz beans) at B-B's.	Zane
S01E16	Denver	Steve, Wes, and Tabor (owner) race to eat the most rocky mountain oysters in ten minutes at the Wood Cellar Bar and Grill.	Tabor
S01E17	Salt Lake City	Steve and Zane race to eat the most Jello cups in ten minutes.	Zane
S01E18	Boise	Steve and Zane race to eat the most french fries in ten minutes at Donnie Mac's Trailer Park Cuisine.	Zane
S01E19	Portland	Steve and Zane race to eat the most hazelnut butter and marian berry sandwiches in two minutes.	Zane
S01E20	Napa	Steve and Zane race to eat the most stuffed grape leaves.	Zane
S01E21	San Francisco	Steve and Zane race to eat a sourdough bread bowl and cup of New England Clam Chowder.	Zane
S01E22	Las Vegas	Steve paired with Ryan (from the restaurant) race against Zane to eat the most fried Oreos in one minute at Aces and Ales.	Zane
S01E23	San Diego	Steve and Zane race to eat the most fish tacos in ten minutes at Pacific Beach Shore Club.	Zane
S01E24	Los Angeles	No eating challenge.	-

== Six Six-Pack Challenges ==
In each episode Zane and Steve challenge each other to a contest. The winner gets six six-packs. Marc always chooses a side before the game begins.

=== Season 1 ===
Episode	Location	Challenge	Winner
S01E01	Phoenix, AZ	Miniature golf	Zane
S01E02	Santa Fe, NM	Keg foot (keg walking)	Steve
S01E03	Austin, TX	Billiards	Steve
S01E04	Dallas, TX	Field goal kicking	Zane
S01E05	New Orleans, LA	First to finish a frozen drink	Zane
S01E06	Florida	Golf ball driving for distance	Zane
S01E07	Atlanta, GA	Keg throwing	Zane
S01E08	Virginia	Bar shuffleboard	Zane
S01E09	Philadelphia, PA	Race up the steps of the Philadelphia Museum of Art	Zane
S01E10	New York, NY	Beer checkers	Steve
S01E11	Boston, MA	Batting cage	Zane
S01E12	Chicago, IL	Go kart racing	Steve
S01E13	Milwaukee, WI	Bowling	Zane
S01E14	St. Louis, MO	Darts	Steve
S01E15	Kansas City, MO	Beer pong	Zane
S01E16	Denver, CO	Hockey shoot out	Steve
S01E17	Salt Lake City, UT	Alpine sled racing	Zane
S01E18	Boise, ID	Sack race	Zane
S01E19	Portland, OR	Washoos	Zane
S01E20	Napa, CA	Bocce	Steve
S01E21	San Francisco, CA	Backwards keg roll racing	Steve
S01E22	Las Vegas, NV	Blackjack	Steve
S01E23	San Diego, CA	Gold fish racing	Steve
S01E24	Los Angeles, CA	No challenge	-
Wins:	Zane: 13, Steve: 10		

=== Season 2 ===
In season two, the challenge was changed to simply the "Six Pack Challenge".

Episode	Location	Challenge	Winner
S02E01	Maui, HI	Bike race down mountain	Zane
S02E01	Maui, HI	Paddleboarding race	Zane
S02E02	Kauai, HI	While snorkeling, 1st to take a picture of Hawaii's state fish	Zane
S02E03	Monterey, CA	Golfing	Zane
S02E04	Key West, FL	Oyster shucking speed contest	Zane
S02E05	Miami, FL	Play Jai alai	Zane
S02E06	Tampa, FL	Sea Doo race	Zane
S02E07	St. Augustine, FL	Atlatl (Seminole spear) hay-bale target practice	Steve
S02E08	Savannah, GA	Fencing match	Zane
S02E09	Washington, D.C.	Target practice at a gun range	Zane
S02E10	Baltimore, MD	Lacrosse	Steve
S02E11	Newport, RI	Tennis	Zane
S02E12	Cape Cod, MA	Sextathalon (6-event competition at Cape Cod Brewery)	Steve
S02E13	Portland, ME	The Wife Carry (Carrying a partner around a pond)	Zane
S02E14	Memphis, TN	Clay pigeon target shooting with a shotgun	Steve
S02E15	Nashville, TN	Roller derby race	Steve
S02E16	Asheville, NC	Beer taste and match test	Steve
S02E17	Charlotte, NC	White water rafting race	Steve
S02E18	Charleston, SC	Underwater hockey	Zane
S02E19	Seattle, WA	Footrace to the top of the Space Needle	Zane
S02E20	Vancouver, BC, CA	Footrace up Grouse Mountain	Steve
S02E21	Spokane, WA	Paintball	Zane
S02E22	Missoula, MT	1-on-1 game of basketball	Steve
S02E23	Santa Barbara, CA	Grape stomping to fill a 1-gallon jug	Zane
S02E24	Aspen, CO	Sled race down a snow hill	Zane
S02E25	Southern California	200-cup beer pong game	Steve
Wins:	Zane: 16, Steve: 10		

== Season Three ==
The first episode of Season 3 aired on October 3, 2012, at 8 pm eastern time. The episodes were:

- Episode 1 - Houston
- Episode 2 - San Antonio
- Episode 3 - Baton Rouge
- Episode 4 - Louisville
- Episode 5 - Indianapolis
- Episode 6 - Anchorage
- Episode 7 - Juneau
- Episode 8 - Quebec City
- Episode 9 - Montreal
- Episode 10 - Burlington
- Episode 11 - Providence
- Episode 12 - Montauk
- Episode 13 - Angel City

== Future ==
According to the official website of the show, "Due to the re-branding of AXS TV and despite the overwhelming support of the fans, Drinking Made Easy will not be continuing with a 4th season on AXS TV. While there is still a chance that the show could be picked up by other networks, Zane and the rest of the crew decided to use this opportunity to return to an international format through the new show Chug. Most of the crew of Drinking Made Easy will continue on with the new project and even crew from Three Sheets, like Executive Producer, Mike Kelly, will be joining the team. "

== Awards and recognition ==
Award Ceremony	Year	Category	Nominee	Result	Source
The People's Telly Awards	2011	TV Program / Segments	Drinking Made Easy	Nominated	
The Tasty Awards	2011	Best Drink or Beverage Program: Television	Drinking Made Easy	Won	
The Tasty Awards	2011	Best Comedy Series	Drinking Made Easy	Nominated	
