= RTK 3 =

Kosovar public TV channel

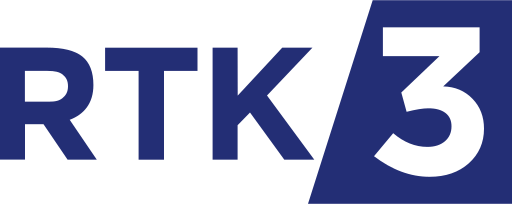
- Country: Kosovo
- Broadcast area: Kosovo
- Headquarters: Pristina, Kosovo

Programming
- Language(s): Albanian
- Picture format: 576i (SDTV 16:9); 1080i (HDTV 16:9)

Ownership
- Owner: RTK
- Key people: Rilind Gërvalla (director)
- Sister channels: RTK 1; RTK 2; RTK 4

History
- Launched: March 13, 2014; 11 years ago

Links
- Website: RTK Website

Availability

Streaming media
- RTK 1: RTK 3 Live
- RTSH: RTK 3 Live (RTSH)

RTK 3 (English: Radio Television of Kosovo 3, Albanian: Radio Televizioni i Kosovës 3) is the third public television channel of Kosovo. As part of the Radio Television of Kosovo (RTK), a public service broadcaster, RTK 3 produces and airs newscasts and talk shows.

== History ==
After the launch of the second public channel (RTK 2), in March 2014, RTK 3 was launched, which is a 24-hour news channel for the Kosovar viewers. It also broadcasts political talk shows. RTK 3 was launched along with the fourth channel, RTK 4, on behalf of the EBU officials. The European Broadcasting Union also helped and funded the launch of the 2 new channels.
