= Motormouth (American TV series) =

- Presented by: Zane Lamprey
- Country of origin: United States

Production
- Running time: 60 minutes (including commercials)

Original release
- Network: VH1
- Release: October 26 – October 28, 2004

Motormouth is an American reality television series on VH1, presented by Zane Lamprey, that showcases people unknowingly being taped in their cars while singing a song. It began airing October 26, 2004. The skits would end when the victim stopped and Lamprey would appear to tell them "You've been Motormouth-ed".

== Episodes (incomplete list) ==
No.	Location	Directed by	Written by	Original release date
1	"Jersey City, New Jersey/Morristown, New Jersey"	James Flint	Brad Gyori	October 26, 2004
Jersey City: Christine. Morristown: Thelma. Champion: Thelma
2	"Las Vegas, Nevada/Staten Island, New York"	James Flint	Brad Gyori	October 27, 2004
Las Vegas: Bennie Mae. Staten Island: Jenna. Champion: Bennie Mae
3	"New Brunswick, New Jersey/Lafayette, Louisiana"	James Flint	Brad Gyori	October 28, 2004
New Brunswick: Manny. Lafayette: Justin. Champion: Justin
4	"Brooklyn, New York/Cincinnati, Ohio"	James Flint	Brad Gyori	October 28, 2004
Brooklyn: Olivia. Cincinnati: Barbara. Champion: Barbara

== See also ==
- Scare Tactics
