= I Bet You =

- Starring: Phil Laak; Antonio Esfandiari
- Country of origin: United States
- No. of seasons: 2
- No. of episodes: 24

Production
- Running time: 25 minutes

Original release
- Network: MOJO HD
- Release: April 16, 2007 – July 10, 2008

I Bet You is a show about the lives of best friends and professional poker players Phil "The Unabomber" Laak and Antonio "The Magician" Esfandiari as they wandered the streets of America betting and daring each other on anything and everything that inspired them, using their own money.

The series was produced by NorthSouth Productions for the MOJO HD network. Two seasons aired on MOJO HD before the network went down on December 1, 2008; a third season was filmed but has gone unaired.

== Cast ==
- Dealer Dolls-Poker Dealers (1 episode, 2007)
- Brian Danner-Himself
- Tim Weske-Himself
- Antonio Esfandiari-Himself - Host (unknown episodes, 2007)
- Phil Laak-Himself - Host (unknown episodes, 2007)
- Melissa Pollard-Poker Dealer (unknown episodes, 2007)
- Brian Wilson WSOP champion

=== Settings ===
Each episode was filmed in a different location, though usually in or around a major American city, such as New York City, Las Vegas or Miami.

== Episodes ==
Most episodes were centered on a big bet (referred to in the title of the episode) of which the development was shown in several pieces. Between those pieces, smaller bets around town were shown.

=== Series overview ===
Season	Episodes	Originally released	
Season	Episodes	First released	Last released
1	10	April 16, 2007	September 23, 2007
2	14	April 10, 2008	July 10, 2008

=== Season 1 (2007) ===
No.	Title	Original release date	Prod. code
1	"Bartending"	April 16, 2007	101
Main bet: Phil and Antonio want to find out who is able to collect more tips when bartending for one hour.
2	"Strip Poker"	April 23, 2007	102
Main bet: Phil and Antonio want to find out who is better at dancing.
3	"Surfing"	April 30, 2007	103
Main bet: Phil and Antonio want to find out who is a better surfer.
4	"Tattoo"	May 7, 2007	104
Main bet: Phil and Antonio want to find out who is better at dune buggy racing.
5	"Roller Derby"	May 14, 2007	105
Main bet: Phil and Antonio want to find out who is a better roller derby player.
6	"YMCA"	May 21, 2007	106
Main bet: Phil and Antonio want to find out who is better at coaching a children's basketball team at a YMCA.
7	"Paintball"	May 28, 2007	107
Main bet: Phil and Antonio want to find out who is better at paintball.
8	"Knights"	June 4, 2007	108
Main bet: Phil and Antonio want to find out who makes a better knight. To find out who is, they compete in a number of games at Medieval Times.
9	"The Lost Footage, Vol. 1"	September 23, 2007	109
Main bet: None, this episode consists of collected unused footage from previous episodes.
10	"The Lost Footage, Vol. 2"	September 23, 2007	110
Main bet: None, this episode consists of collected unused footage from previous episodes.

=== Season 2 (2008) ===
No. overall	No. in season	Title	Original release date	Prod. code
11	1	"Sperm Bank" "Who's more of a man?"	April 10, 2008	201
Main bet: Phil and Antonio visit a sperm bank to measure their manliness by testing their sperm. They bet on measures of volume, motility, and count.
12	2	"Modeling"	April 17, 2008	202
Main bet: Phil and Antonio are judged on who would be a better model. They are judged on three criteria: better walkway performance, better photo shoot, and a tie-breaking better Zoolander pose.
13	3	"Firefighting"	April 24, 2008	203
Main bet: Phil and Antonio do firefighter training to determine who would make the better firefighter.
14	4	"Air Combat"	May 1, 2008	204
Main bet: Phil and Antonio do fighter pilot training to determine who would make the better fighter pilot. They are also joined by Jennifer Tilly and a mime and compete in a game of charades.
15	5	"Songwriting"	May 8, 2008	205
Main bet: Phil and Antonio bet on who is the better singer and song writer.
16	6	"Camping"	May 15, 2008	206
Main bet: Phil and Antonio bet who can catch the first fish when they go fishing at the end of their camping trip.
17	7	"Demolition Derby"	May 22, 2008	207
Main bet: Phil and Antonio decide to find out who would win a demolition derby contest in Tennessee. However, since Phil has injured his toe, the line-producer Chris takes his place in the car. The duo also visit a Civil War re-enactment event and make various bets.
18	8	"F1 Racing"	May 29, 2008	208
Main bet: Phil and Antonio visit a racing school in Las Vegas and bet on who would be a better Formula One racer. They also meet and make bets with Eli Elezra and Howard Lederer.
19	9	"Detectives"	June 5, 2008	209
Main bet: Phil and Antonio want to find out who is a better detective. They also make bets hanging around the Las Vegas Strip and play a strip roleplaying game with strippers as their teammates.
20	10	"Fencing"	June 12, 2008	210
Main bet: Phil and Antonio find out who is better at fencing. They also meet up with Marianela Pereyra and bet on who could last riding a mechanical bull the longest. The duo also bet on who would need psychotherapy the most.
21	11	"Radio"	June 19, 2008	211
Main bet: Phil and Antonio find out who is a better radio host by spending a day on the air with Loveline. They also bet on who would build a better ice sculpture, who could train a mouse to run through the maze the fastest, and also meet up with Annie Duke to have a rock-paper-scissors competition between her and passers-by in the street.
22	12	"Circus"	June 26, 2008	212
Main bet: Phil and Antonio see who is a better trapeze artist. The duo also bet on other circus-based activities, on who could sell more lemonade in the street, and compete in street luge.
23	13	"Ballet"	July 3, 2008	213
Main bet: Phil and Antonio see who is a better ballet dancer by being judged on similar routines.
24	14	"Vegas"	July 10, 2008	214
Main bet: Phil and Antonio see who is the better skydiver.

== Home releases ==
Season #	# of Discs	# of Episodes	Region 1 release
1	2	10	June 24, 2008
