= Have Fork, Will Travel =

Have Fork, Will Travel is a television show that premiered on September 4, 2007 on the Food Network. Host Zane Lamprey traveled to various countries, exploring the native cuisine and culture. One season (with a total of 13 episodes) was produced.

== Reception ==
According to Food Network executive Bob Tuschman, Lamprey's "everyman quality" appeals to a broad audience. However, its mocking tone drew criticism from food critic Anthony Bourdain.
