= Besim Dina =

Kosovar comedian, actor, writer, producer and TV host

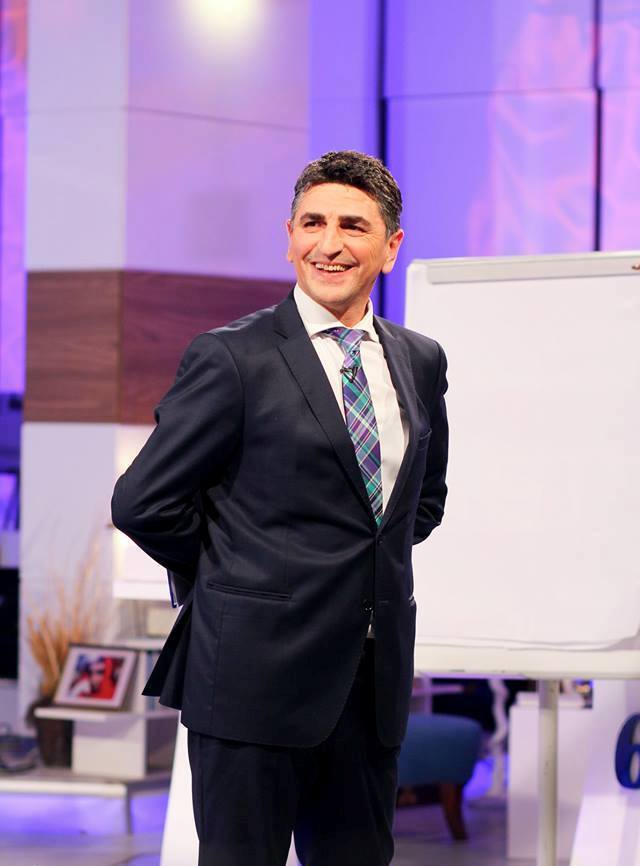
- Born: Besim Dina; 6 July 1971 (age 54); Gjakove, Kosovo
- Notable work: Oxygen Show (2008–present)

Comedy career
- Years active: 1990–present
- Medium: Television, film, stand up
- Website: kohavision.tv/ballina/oxygen/

Besim Dina (born 6 July 1971) is a Kosovar comedian, actor, writer, producer and television host. He has been the host and executive producer of Oxygen Show on Klan Kosova since 2008.

In 2023, he was one of the two main hosts of the first edition of the Kosovan song contest Festivali i Këngës në RTK, alongside Adi Krasta.

== Sources ==
- "Besim Dina me Oksigjen në KTV (video)".
- "Adi Krasta dhe Besim Dina bashkë në një emision [video]".
