= The King of Miami =

American television series

The King of Miami (2007–2008) was a reality comedy TV show that tracked the adventures of comedian Dave Hill and his sidekick (Phil Costello) as they try to establish themselves as big-name celebrities in Miami, Florida. Despite having dubious credentials and being from Cleveland, Ohio, Hill adopts the moniker “The King of Miami” and begins acquiring the accoutrements and buzz of a famous Miamian.

The show was co-created by Hill and Elyse Roth.

The King of Miami ran for one season. The show aired on the MOJO HD network. It is also currently airing on Film24 in the United Kingdom.
