= Zane Lamprey =

American actor, screenwriter and producer

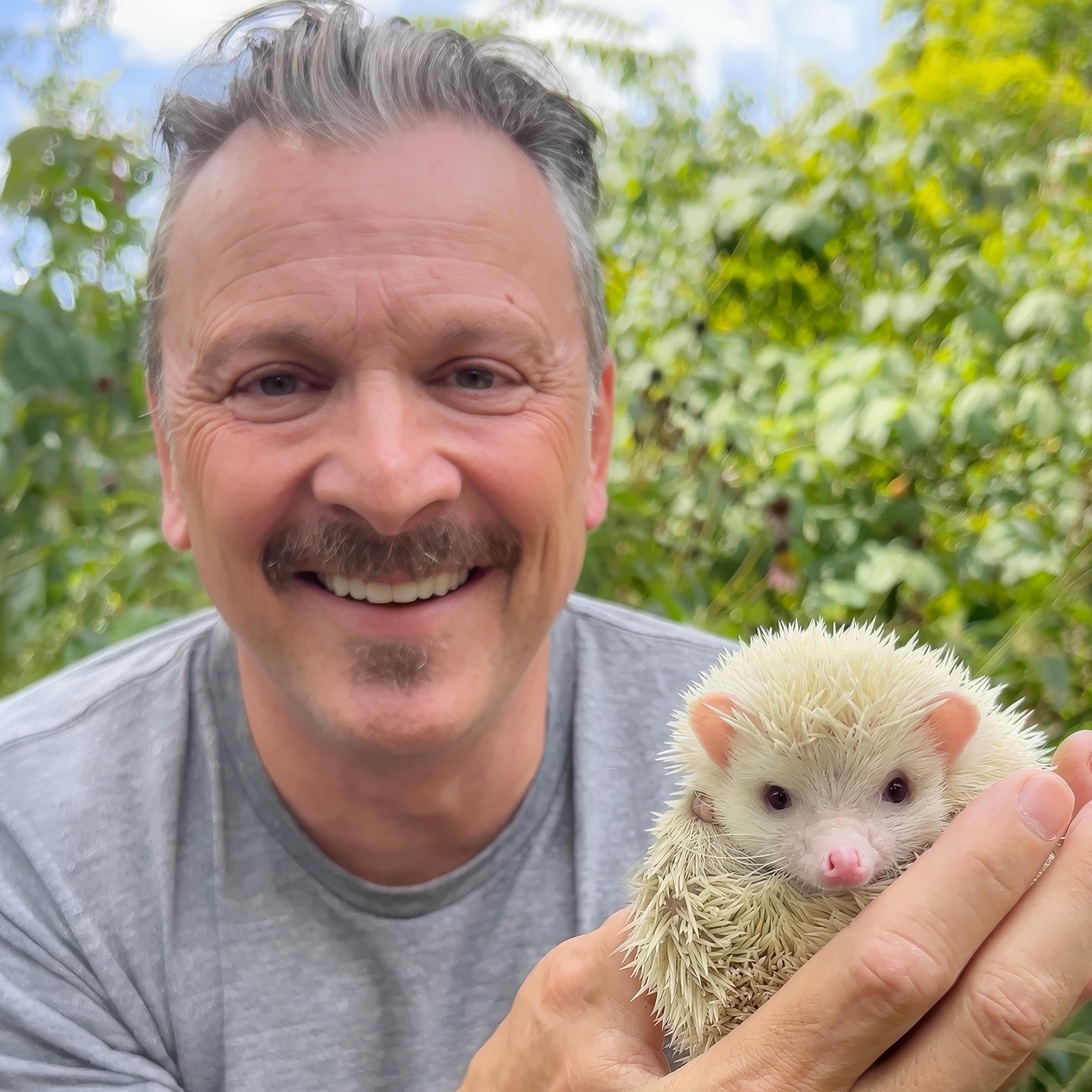
- Zane Lamprey holding a hedgehog.
- Born: April 2, 1972 (age 54); Syracuse, New York
- Education: SUNY Cortland
- Occupations: Actor; Writer; Producer; Editor; Director; Entrepreneur
- Television: Three Sheets and Drinking Made Easy
- Spouse: Melissa Lamprey
- Website: http://www.zanelamprey.com/

Zane Lamprey (born April 2, 1972 in Syracuse, New York, United States) is a comedian, actor, and author. After two decades pursuing a career in entertainment in Los Angeles, Lamprey landed his breakout role hosting the cult sensation Three Sheets for the now defunct MOJO HD channel.

Shortly after arriving in Los Angeles, Lamprey began creating hidden-camera shows with friends. Over time, as many of his collaborators left the city or moved on from entertainment, he continued pursuing creative work independently. Drawing on the skills he developed producing his own projects, Lamprey secured a series of editing and producing positions within the television industry. He went on to develop and sell multiple television concepts, including hidden-camera formats, and appeared in several pilots and series. Early in his career, he hosted television pilots for networks including VH1, was a cast member on the short-lived MTV series Damage Control, and sold projects to Comedy Central, Warner Bros. Animation, and Merv Griffin Entertainment.

Lamprey's career took off when he began hosting Three Sheets, which had him traveling around the world to learn about cultures by drinking with the locals. While still shooting Three Sheets, he was also signed on for his own Food Network show called Have Fork, Will Travel, where he proved that the magic of his hosting was not just inside the bottle.

When MOJO HD went off the air, Lamprey hosted a second travel-drinking show in 2010, Drinking Made Easy, for Mark Cuban's HDNet. He has also hosted travel-drinking shows for National Geographic Channel (Chug), and Amazon Prime (Four Sheets).

== Early life ==
Zane David Lamprey was born on April 2, 1972, in Syracuse, New York to Ann Lamprey (born 1944), a physical therapist, and Donald Lamprey (1940–1991), an engineer who co-owned the Midstate Elevator company. He has an older brother, Dan, and a younger sister, Amy.

At age 15, Lamprey was diagnosed with attention deficit hyperactivity disorder (ADHD). The diagnosis did little to help his parents clarify a path forward, as he continued to struggle in traditional classroom settings but excelled in art and theatre. He received several awards for his paintings and was active in local and community theatre productions before stepping away from acting in high school due to self-consciousness and worried about not being considered cool.

Lamprey was admitted to the SUNY Cortland largely on the strength of his art portfolio, despite his academic record, where he majored in fine arts with a concentration in oil painting. After years of spending long hours working alone in the studio, he realized that a solitary artistic career did not suit him. He briefly switched his focus to pre-med studies, spending much of his time studying while his peers socialized. Ultimately, he returned to complete his fine arts degree while pursuing a minor in theatre, a decision that rekindled his enthusiasm for performing and entertaining.

After taking five years to graduate from college, Lamprey moved out to Los Angeles to pursue comedy and acting.

== Career ==
Early in his career he worked on several projects for Comedy Central, VH1 and Nickelodeon. He was also a cast member on MTV's Damage Control and host of VH1's reality show Motormouth.

He is best known for hosting Three Sheets, which ran on MOJO HD from 2006 through 2008, Fine Living channel in 2009 and the Travel Channel in 2010. He also hosted Have Fork, Will Travel, which previously ran on Food Network, a show similar to Three Sheets focusing on local food and eating customs. The February/March 2009 of Mutineer Magazine featured an extensive interview with Zane Lamprey, which highlighted Lamprey's views of fine beverage and the evolution of Three Sheets. Zane Lamprey appeared on the April/May 2009 cover of Mutineer Magazine, which also featured an exclusive behind the scenes look at Three Sheets with photos from Lamprey's personal collection.

After Three Sheets, Zane Lamprey created Drinking Made Easy, a similar drinking and traveling show focused on American bars and drinks. Drinking Made Easy ran on AXS TV for three seasons and a total of 62 episodes until 2013. After the show's end, Zane worked together with fans of his previous shows to create a new crowd-funded travel and drinking show known as Chug. After raising $591,804, six hour-long episodes were created and were expected to be released in 2014.

Lamprey has performed stand-up comedy full time since June 2021. After his 2020 stand-up tour was canceled due to the COVID-19 pandemic, he attempted to rebook shows in early 2021, but many comedy clubs and theaters were uncertain whether they would reopen that year. As an alternative, Lamprey reached out to friends who owned breweries and proposed performing stand-up comedy at their venues, an idea that was well-received. In 2021, he performed at 140 breweries across the United States. He has continued this model since, performing primarily at breweries around the country. As of January 1, 2026, Lamprey has performed stand-up comedy at breweries more than 600 times since 2021. In addition to his brewery shows, he also performs at comedy clubs in Los Angeles.

== Media projects ==
=== Three Sheets ===
Lamprey's first television project was an international travelogue/pub crawl series which initially aired on MOJO HD, named Three Sheets. The format of the show featured Lamprey traveling abroad learning about the origin of regional drinks and their drinking customs.

After MOJO HD ceased operations and went off the air on December 1, 2008, Zane worked to find a network to pick up Three Sheets. Several networks were approached about purchasing the series, including the successor to the MOJO HD network, the Screaming Flea Productions.

On December 16, 2008, Lamprey hosted a rally to generate awareness of Three Sheets in an attempt to garner interest from other networks. The rally took place in Los Angeles, California and attracted approximately 400 people. A second rally on December 18, 2008 in New York City brought around 700 people. The chairman of HDNet, Mark Cuban was in attendance at the New York rally and expressed interest in acquiring the show.

On May 2, 2009 Zane announced that the Fine Living Network (FLN) had purchased Three Sheets. Three Sheets was originally set to begin airing on FLN on Friday May 29, 2009 at 11:00pm and 11:30pm, but delays in the closure of the deal resulted in the premiere of the first two episodes of the nineteen-episode season being pushed to June 5, 2009.

However, on June 2, 2009, Lamprey reported that the deal was still not complete. On June 22, FLN finally made the official announcement that Three Sheets would begin airing July 20, 2009 and would air new episodes each Monday with rerun episodes scheduled to run Tuesday through Friday. Lamprey said on his website that the likelihood of the show being picked up for a fifth season would depend on the ratings of Season 4, with a focus on the ratings of the premiere.

In October 2009, it was announced that FLN would be re-branded as Cooking Channel, with content similar to their sister channel Food Network. Three Sheets was canceled from the re-branded network and Lamprey again began the search for a new network. Lamprey did find a home for Three Sheets on the Travel Channel for a brief stint in 2010 when fans flooded the Travel Channel's official Facebook page with support for the show. After one month, Travel Channel dropped Three Sheets from its lineup.

In February 2011, Three Sheets again found a home on a new network with Spike TV. Spike aired the first seven episodes of the third season that originally aired on FLN, but no further episodes have been shown since. Despite being absent from the television network, Three Sheets was still listed on Spike TV's official website as late as November 2014.
