= Phil Laak =

Irish-born American poker player (born 1972)

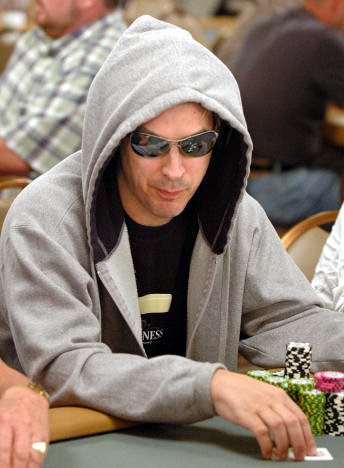
- Laak in 2006
- Nickname: The Unabomber
- Born: September 8, 1972 (age 54); Dublin, Ireland

World Series of Poker
- Bracelet: 1
- Final tables: 6
- Money finishes: 21
- Highest WSOP Main Event finish: 412th, 2015

World Poker Tour
- Title: 1
- Final tables: 4
- Money finishes: 9

European Poker Tour
- Title: None
- Final table: None
- Money finish: 1

Philip Courtney Laak (born September 8, 1972) is an Irish-American professional poker player and poker commentator residing in Los Angeles, California. Laak holds a World Poker Tour (WPT) title, a World Series of Poker (WSOP) bracelet, and has appeared on numerous nationally aired television shows.

== Early life ==
Laak was born in Dublin, Ireland and his family moved to Wellesley, Massachusetts, when he was four years old. He was raised on the East Coast of the United States, and he lives in Los Angeles and Las Vegas.

Laak graduated from the University of Massachusetts Amherst with a degree in mechanical engineering and worked in varying jobs prior to getting into open poker games in California. He is a former roommate of fellow professional poker player Antonio Esfandiari. Prior to moving to the west, Laak lived for several years in New York City where he honed his skills as a backgammon player before turning his focus to poker.

== Poker career ==
Laak learned to play poker as a child. His first major tournament victory was at the World Poker Tour (WPT) Celebrity Invitational in February 2004. He has made two other WPT final tables since his victory: sixth place in both the season two Battle of Champions and the 2005 Five Diamond World Poker Classic.

At the 2005 World Series of Poker (WSOP), Laak finished second to Johnny Chan in the $2,500 pot limit hold 'em event. Laak defeated Ram Vaswani to win the inaugural William Hill Poker Grand Prix, taking home the £150,000 first prize. He has also competed in numerous Poker Royale series. Laak appeared on seasons two through seven of High Stakes Poker on GSN, and served as the dealer on the short-lived television series E! Hollywood Hold'em.

Laak was a winner of NBC's Poker After Dark, earning the weekly prize of $120,000. The tournament was titled "Phil Phil" because both Phil Laak and Phil Hellmuth were contenders. Apart from Laak and Hellmuth the table consisted of Doyle Brunson, Antonio Esfandiari, Jennifer Harman, and Erik Seidel. He again won $120,000 in the "Nicknames" episode, defeating Annette Obrestad, Mike Matusow, Antonio Esfandiari, Erick Lindgren and Phil Hellmuth.

At the 2007 conference of the Association for the Advancement of Artificial Intelligence in Vancouver, British Columbia, Laak and fellow professional player Ali Eslami competed against, and beat, Polaris, a poker playing computer program developed at the University of Alberta, in two of the four rounds with the remaining rounds being a loss and a draw.

In 2008, Laak made a cameo appearance in the Knight Rider television movie, where he was credited as "Poker Pro".

Laak wrote a monthly column called "Being Phil Laak", in the poker-themed Bluff Magazine, from 2005 until the magazine folded in 2015. Laak co-hosted a show called I Bet You on the (MOJO network) with his friend Antonio Esfandiari, where they can be found betting on any and all things.

Laak also played in the 2009 Aussie Millions cash game Invitational.

In October 2009, Laak was crowned PartyPoker.com World Open V champion winning $250,000 in the process. He overcame a final table that included Luke 'FullFlush' Schwartz and Laak's long-term partner, actress and poker pro Jennifer Tilly.

On September 16, 2010, Laak won his first career WSOP bracelet by winning the £2,500 buy-in Six-Handed No-Limit Hold’em championship at the 2010 World Series of Poker Europe. His win came after an accident involving an all-terrain vehicle in August, where he suffered a broken elbow amongst other injuries.

World Series of Poker bracelet
| Year | Tournament | Prize |
|---|---|---|
| 2010E | £2,650 Six-Handed No-Limit Hold’em | £170,802 |

An "E" following a year denotes bracelet(s) won at the World Series of Poker Europe

As of 2018, his total live tournament winnings exceed $3,650,000.

== Nickname and personality ==
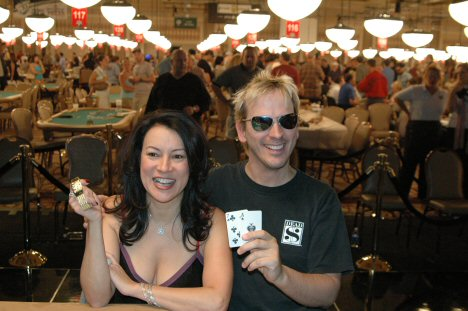
Jennifer Tilly and Phil Laak right after her win at the 2005 World Series of Poker $1,000 Ladies Only Event – No Limit Hold'em.

Laak became known widely in the poker scene as the "Unabomber" because of the hooded sweatshirt and sunglasses he wears at the table, making him resemble the forensic sketch of Theodore Kaczynski, who was known as the Unabomber. These items were given to him by fellow poker player Gus Hansen. Laak is also known for his unusual and inventive manner of speech. He coined the poker terms "felted", which means having lost all of one's chips (i.e. nothing left in front of the player except the table felt), as well as "upstuck", meaning being down from your high point of the session (i.e., if you won $15,000 and then lost $10,000 within the same session). He also coined the terms "POW" (Pay-off wizard), which he uses in a self-mocking fashion (i.e. one who pays off big bets on the river), and "Cherry bomb", which refers to large, ultimately unsuccessful bets.

Laak played the first day of the Main Event of the 2008 World Series of Poker incognito, in a latex mask, wig, make-up, and costume. His disguise was reported thereafter by AP reporter Oskar Garcia. The WSOP 2009 rules added a new rule prohibiting wearing masks at the table.

On June 2–7, 2010, at the Bellagio in Las Vegas, Laak set the world record for the longest time spent playing poker in a single session. He halted at 115 hours. The previous official record, 72 hours and 2 minutes, was held by Larry Olmsted, set at the Foxwoods Resort Casino in 2004. Guinness allows one 5-minute break every hour, in which Laak could do whatever he wanted, and Laak could "bank" those 5-minute breaks into longer breaks if he played through. Laak banked several breaks to take a 30-minute nap (allowed), but he vows that he did not use caffeine or any stimulants. Playing $10/$20 No-Limit Hold'em (with uncapped buy-ins), Laak finished up $6,766 and donated half of his winnings to charity. He did this for Camp Sunshine, a charity that helps sick children enjoy summer camp. His feat was witnessed live on streaming video by over 130,000 people.
