= RTK 2 =

Kosovar public TV channel

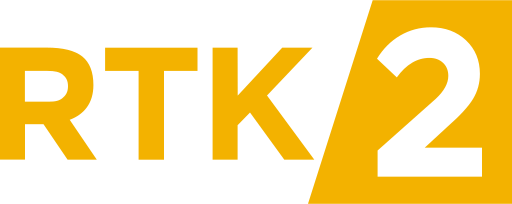
- Country: Kosovo
- Broadcast area: Kosovo, Serbia
- Headquarters: Pristina, Kosovo

Programming
- Languages: Serbian (predominantly); Turkish; Bosnian; Romani
- Picture format: 576i (SDTV 16:9); 1080i (HDTV 16:9)

Ownership
- Owner: RTK
- Key people: Željko Tvrdišić (director)
- Sister channels: RTK 1; RTK 3; RTK 4

History
- Launched: June 2013; 13 years ago

Links
- Website: RTK 2

Availability

Streaming media
- RTK 2: RTK 2 Live

RTK 2 (English: Radio Television of Kosovo 2, Serbian: Радио Телевизија Косова 2 / Radio Televizija Kosova 2, Albanian: Radio Televizioni i Kosovës 2) is the second public television channel of Kosovo, providing news and shows.

As part of the Radio Television of Kosovo (RTK), a public service broadcaster, RTK 2 produces and airs newscasts, sports updates and talk shows of interest for Kosovo's largest minorities, and also airs in all the territory of Kosovo. As it is called the "minority channel", RTK 2 broadcasts programs for all the minorities of Kosovo; mostly programs in Serbian, as well as programs in the other minority languages, Bosnian, Turkish, and Romani.

== History ==
Before the launch of RTK 2, each of the other minorities in Kosovo had a special program in their own language on the primary public broadcaster, RTK 1. After the launch of RTK 2, all the programs moved to RTK 2, and started airing there, and thus, creating new programs.

In June 2013, RTK 2 had 50 employees. Although most programs will be in Serbian, the RTK 2 director, Zarko Joksimovic, stated that it won't be a purely Serbian channel, the TV station will also broadcast programs in Bosnian, Turkish and Romani languages.
