= Timothy Sykes =

American stock trader

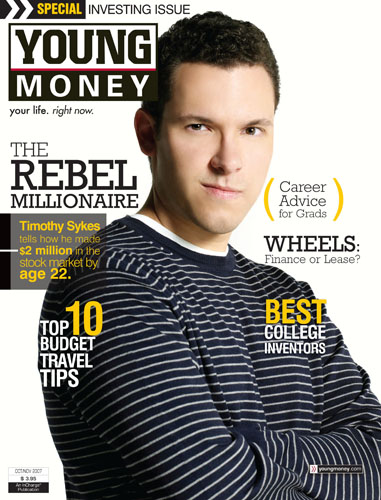
- Sykes on the cover of Young Money magazine for November 2007
- Born: April 15, 1981 (age 45); Orange, Connecticut, U.S.
- Education: Tulane University
- Website: timothysykes.com

Timothy Sykes is a penny stock trader and blogger who self-reported trading profits of $1.65 million from a $12,415 Bar mitzvah gift through day trading while in college. He runs a blog and subscription platform whose aim is to teach about how to trade penny stocks. According to a Forbes editorial piece, he made up to $20 million via subscriptions to this platform in 2015 alone.

== Career ==
Timothy Sykes graduated from Tulane University in 2003 with a bachelor's degree in philosophy and a minor in business. He is Jewish. While at Tulane, Sykes routinely cut classes to day trade. In 2003 he founded Cilantro Fund Management, a small-short bias hedge fund, using $1 million mostly from his friends and family. After initially acquiring profits the fund shut down 3 years later due to heavy losses.

In 2006, Sykes was included on Trader Monthly's "30 Under 30" list of up-and-coming traders in the market, a selection which editor Randall Lane later called "our worst pick" among the chosen honorees. Sykes claimed that the Cilantro Fund was "the number one long-short microstock hedge fund in the country, according to Barclays"; Lane later discovered that the rating came from "the Barclay Group," a small research company based in Fairfield, Iowa, and not the well-known Barclays British bank.

In 2008 Sykes attempted to recreate his initial investing success by again starting with $12,415.

Sykes self-published An American Hedge Fund: How I Made $2 Million as a Stock Operator & Created a Hedge Fund in 2007. The book documented Sykes' experiences as a day-trader and the difficulties he encountered in attempting to start a hedge fund.

In 2012, Sykes created "Miss Penny Stock," a financial beauty pageant among the female representatives for his brand and company.

Sykes has appeared on Below Deck twice, on season 2 episode 10 and season 5 episode 13.

== Teaching and other projects ==
After the shutdown of Cilantro Fund Partners in 2007, Sykes wrote the book "An American Hedge Fund" and launched TimothySykes.com.>

In 2009, Sykes launched Investimonials.com, a website devoted to collecting user reviews of financial services, videos, and books, as well as financial brokers.

Sykes co-founded Profit.ly in 2011, a social service with about 20,000 users that provides stock trade information online. Sykes said the service serves three purposes: "creating public track records for gurus, newsletter writers and students. He also wants everyone to learn from both the wins and losses of other traders to benefit the entire industry." One of Sykes’ students, Tim Grittani, was able to turn $1,500 into $1 million in three years by trading stocks. Another student, Jack Kellogg, made more than $10 million by stock trading under Sykes’ tutelage.

Sykes founded The Timothy Sykes Foundation, which has raised $600,000 and has partnered with Make-a-Wish Foundation and The Boys and Girls Club.

In February 2017, Sykes donated $1 million to Pencils of Promise to help build 20 new primary schools across Ghana, Guatemala and Laos which are to be completed between 2017 and 2018.

The Timothy Sykes Foundation was eventually renamed the Karmagawa Foundation and by 2019, Karmagawa had built 57 schools and donated more than $4 million to 45 charities for environmental causes.

In 2020, Sykes and Karmagawa made a joint pledge to donate $1 million for relief efforts in Yemen during the Yemeni civil war and the cholera and COVID-19 epidemics. Karmagawa built its 100th school in Myanmar in 2022.

== Controversy ==
Sykes has publicly criticized various businesses and celebrities, including Shaquille O'Neal and Justin Bieber, for promoting "pump and dump" schemes, in which an investor purchases stock, hypes others into buying that stock to inflate its price, then sells the shares at a higher price. The investor subsequently shorts the stock to profit from the resulting decline.

In May 2017, Sykes and Bow Wow had an Instagram feud in which at least one user accused Sykes of using "coded racist language".

In 2020, Sykes was sued for allegedly stealing trading platform technology. The lawsuit was filed by Scanz Technologies, Inc., who claimed that Sykes copied their trading platform, EquityFeed, to create a copycat platform called StocksToTrade. Scanz Technologies alleged that Sykes violated a termination contract by copying the look, feel, assets, and trade secrets of EquityFeed. They sought $10 million in damages plus punitive damages.
