= RTK 1 =

Public television channel in Kosovo

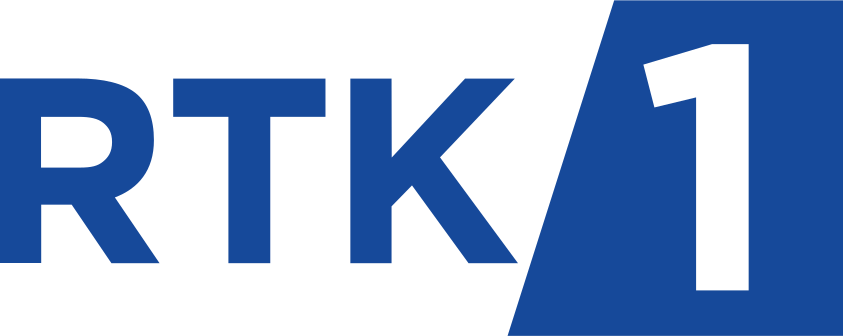
- Logo used since 2013
- Country: Kosovo
- Broadcast area: Europe
- Headquarters: Pristina, Kosovo

Programming
- Language: Albanian
- Picture format: 576i (SDTV 16:9); 1080i (HDTV 16:9)

Ownership
- Owner: RTK
- Key people: Rilind Gërvalla (director)
- Sister channels: RTK 2; RTK 3; RTK 4

History
- Launched: November 1974 (as RTP); June 1999 (as RTK)

Links
- Website: RTK 1

Availability

Streaming media
- RTK 1: RTK 1 Live

RTK 1 (English: Radio Television of Kosovo 1, Albanian: Radio Televizioni i Kosovës 1) is the first public television channel of Kosovo, providing general programming. As part of the Radio Television of Kosovo (RTK), a public service broadcaster, RTK 1 produces and airs newscasts, sports updates and talk shows of interest to Kosovo viewers. RTK 1 airs throughout the whole territory of Kosovo, as well as in Albania, North Macedonia, Montenegro, Slovenia, Germany and Switzerland.

== History ==
RTK 1 was founded a few weeks after the end of the NATO bombing of Yugoslavia, at the instigation of then United Nations Interim Administration Mission in Kosovo & the Organization for Security and Co-operation in Europe. Originally funded through contributions from international donors, this $3 Million Project, but it was also strongly supported by Bernard Kouchner, then senior UN Official in Kosovo.

In February 2008, RTK was made a national public service television. A few months later, the Director-General Agim Zatriqi abandoned his functions at the head of the RTK, denouncing the ruling party's interference in the management of the chain. These accusations were later taken up by the head of the European Broadcasting Union. Jean Réveillon, stated that "the pressure from the Kosovo government to transform the Kosovo Radio and Television into a radio-television of non-critical state that will not be useful to citizens."

RTK 1 also broadcasts political debates and broadcasts as well as sessions of the Kosovo Assembly. RTK 1 also used to broadcast programs in the other minority languages of Kosovo. After the launch of the second public channel, RTK 2, which is supposed to air in all the minority languages of Kosovo, all the programs moved there.
