= Radio Television of Kosovo =

Public broadcaster of Kosovo

- Type: Radio, television and online
- Country: Kosovo
- First air date: September 19, 1999; 26 years ago
- TV stations: RTK 1; RTK 2; RTK 3; RTK 4
- Radio stations: Radio Kosova 1 Radio Kosova 2
- Headquarters: Pristina, Kosovo
- Broadcast area: Worldwide
- Owner: Government of Kosovo
- Key people: Hysen Hundozi (Acting)
- Launch date: 1945 (as Radio Pristina); 1974 (as part of Television Belgrade); 29 November 1975 (as RTP); 19 September 1999 (as RTK)
- Official website: www.rtklive.com
- Replaced: Radio Television of Pristina

The Radio Television of Kosovo (Albanian: Radiotelevizioni i Kosovës; (Note: Formerly spelled Radio Televizioni i Kosovës.) Serbian: Радио-телевизија Косова, romanized: Radio-televizija Kosova; RTK) is the public service broadcaster in Kosovo. It was founded after the Kosovo War, replacing the equipment and property of the RTS branch in Pristina. RTK operates two radio services, offering a diverse range of news, music, and entertainment programs. Additionally, it runs four 24-hour television channels, broadcasting a variety of content including news, sports, culture, movies, and documentaries. RTK’s services are available on terrestrial and satellite networks, ensuring wide accessibility across Kosovo and to the diaspora.

As a public service broadcaster, RTK is funded through a combination of public funding, advertising revenue, and donations.

The RTK replaced the Radio Television of Pristina (Albanian: Radiotelevizioni i Prishtinës; Serbian: Радиотелевизија Приштинa, romanized: Radiotelevizija Priština) which was originally founded in 1974 until its end in 1990.

== History ==
=== Radio Television of Pristina (1974-1992) ===
Logo of RTP (1974–1992)

In 1945, Radio Pristina (Albanian: Radio Prishtina) began broadcasting out of Prizren following the Second World War. The Albanian-language editorial office of Television Belgrade was founded in 1966, and by 1974 it began airing television programming from the station, borrowing its equipment since it had no equipment of its own. On 29 November 1975, the Radio Television of Pristina (RTP) was founded in accordance with the 1974 Constitution of the SFRY as the first and only Albanian-language broadcaster, with its own headquarters in Pristina employing 1,700 people.

On 5 July 1990, the station was threatened to follow orders from a new Serbia-appointed director, foregoing any editorial independence. The majority of the staff refused, and thus the RTP was violently repossessed by the Serbian police. Almost all Kosovo Albanian employees were fired as the station went dark in the middle of a news broadcast. The remaining 50 employees were left operating the station under surveillance of, and allegiance to Serbia and later in 1992, the television itself, together with Television Belgrade and Television Novi Sad, became a branch of the Radio Television of Serbia (Serbian: РТС Приштина, romanized: RTS Priština).

=== Radio Television of Kosovo (1999-present) ===
RTK's previous logo used from 1999 to 2013

The newly liberated Kosovo regained control of RTP on 28 June 1999 after the end of the Kosovo War. After UNMIK took over the administration of Kosovo in June 1999 and re-employed former RTP staffs, RTK began broadcasting on 19 September 1999 via analog satellite in PAL and SECAM television broadcast standards with a daily two-hour transmission, expanding to four hours per day in November 2000, with programming mainly in Albanian and once-a-day news edition in Serbian and Turkish. The following July, it expanded to seven hours a day and began offering programming in Bosnian as well.

In 2001, RTK was established as an independent public service broadcaster by a UNMIK broadcasting regulation. The station was initially managed by the European Broadcasting Union to permit time for a non-political Board of Directors to be established. This was in place and the station was independent of the EBU by the end of the year. In January 2002, an office was opened in Tirana, with a website launching in July. A second office was opened in Tetovo in November 2002.

In 2002, at which time it was broadcasting 15 hours a day, 35% of the station's broadcasts were produced externally, with the bulk of programming local. It included news and business coverage as well as farming information. Broadcasting remained multilingual, with programming in another language (the Romani language magazine “Yekhipe") beginning in September 2003. On 22 December of that year, the station began broadcasting 24 hours a day. Also in 2002, RTK began hosting awards, with the best news moderator being honored by the "Drita Germizaj" award and the best cameraman by the "Rudolf Sopi" award.

RTK's radio transmission began with the October 1999 acquisition of the multilingual public radio station "Radio Prishtina", which became "Radio Kosovo". In 2000, it acquired the multi-ethnic UN youth radio station Radio Blue Sky.

In 2013, RTK introduced a new logo and a newly corporate identity for the first time of 14 years since 1999. By that, the grey-coloured 1-numeral along with the red letter R, the white letter T, and the yellow letter K are all replaced by something brand new that is the RTK wordmark which is coloured blue, but it has the letter K being put inside a half square. At the same time, RTK's TV services were expanded to include a channel called RTK 2, which is intended to focus on minorities, and with it, all minority language programming were moved from RTK 1 to RTK 2.

By 2014, RTK saw the launch of two new stations such as RTK 3 which is a news channel and RTK 4 which is an arts and documentary channel. In 2018, the network switched to high-definition broadcasting for all its channels.

Journalists at RTK have repeatedly protested in 2015 against political interference, up to asking for the dismissal of chief editors for obstruction and internal censorship.

== Management ==
RTK is regulated by the Law on Public Broadcasting, and it is governed by a Board whose members are approved by the Kosovo Assembly. Its financing was originally guaranteed by a license fee paid over electricity bill, until the Constitutional Court declared that it was not due and shifted RTK's budget over state subsidy (0.7% of Kosovo's budget). The change raised concerns for the preservation of RTK's independence. The legal requirement for RTK to plan an end to the transitional state budget funding has not been enacted.

RTK has been criticised for lack of investigative journalism and political bias, e.g. in the extensive coverage of the ruling political party (including the annual meeting of the ruling Democratic Party of Kosovo) as opposed to the short and misleading coverage of opposition Vetëvendosje 2012 protests, which was deemed "a major signal of state financing putting the editorial independence of public television at risk" (IREX, 2013b).

RTK Board members are elected by the Parliament by majority vote, thus entrusting their appointment to the majority parties. Political pressures aside, RTK maintains an untapped potential thanks to good equipment and professional editors and journalists.

== EBU membership ==
The RTK has cooperated with the European Broadcasting Union since its inception. However, it is not yet a member and has campaigned for its membership. Such a thing isn't possible given that Kosovo isn't a member of the International Telecommunication Union (ITU) or the Council of Europe, both formal requirements for EBU membership. Kosovo's application to the Council of Europe is still underway. One of the main motivations for the RTK to become an EBU member is its potential participation in the Eurovision Song Contest, the campaign for which has also been going since 2014. In 2023, the RTK began its efforts to embed itself into a possible debut at the Eurovision Song Contest by hosting its own annual song contest, Festivali i Këngës (adapted from but not to be confused with Albania's contest of the same name).

== Logos ==
=== Television ===
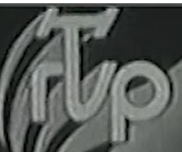
RTP logo in 1974

RTP logo since 1989

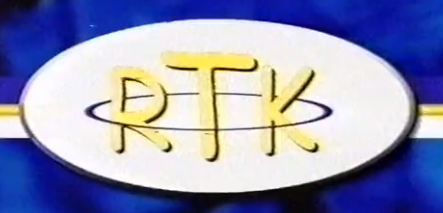
RTK logo in the first broadcast after the War in 1999

RTK logo from 1999-2013

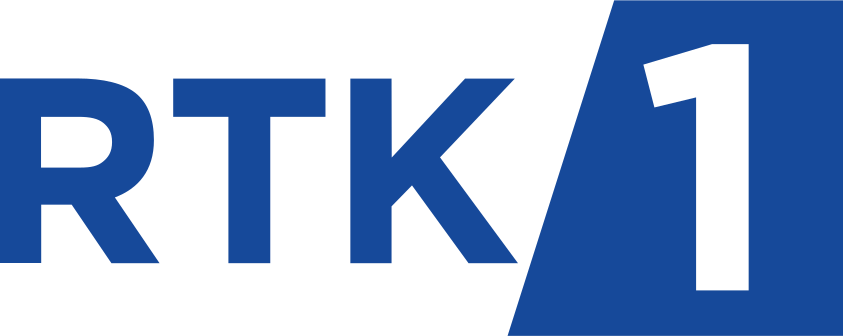
RTK 1 logo from 2013

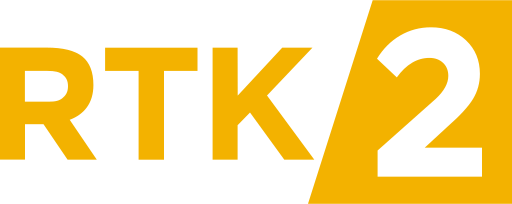
RTK 2 logo

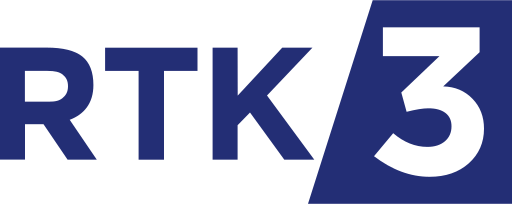
RTK 3 logo

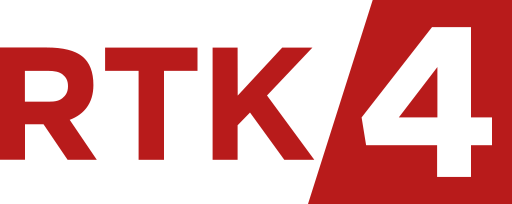
RTK 4 logo

=== Radio ===
The logo of Radio Kosova 1 from 1999-2013

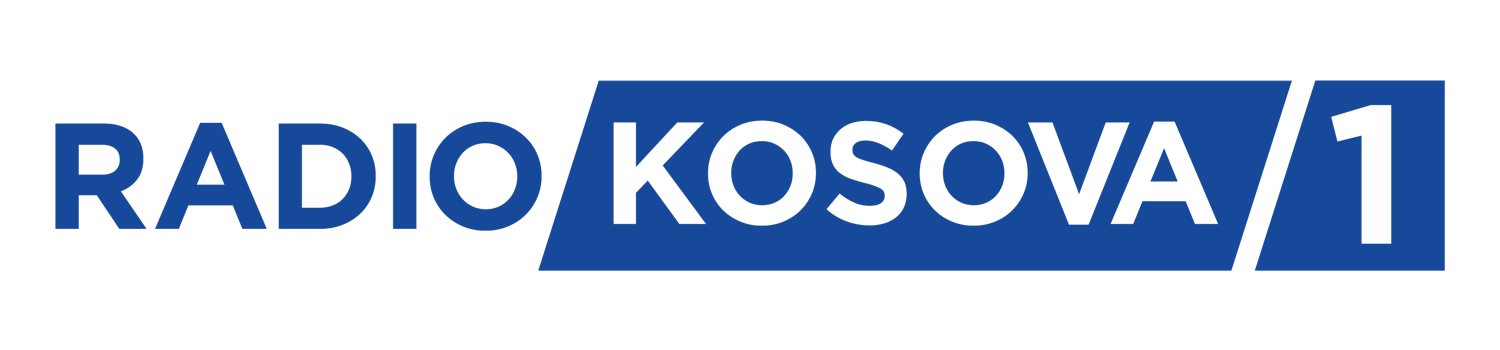
The logo of Radio Kosova 1 from 2013

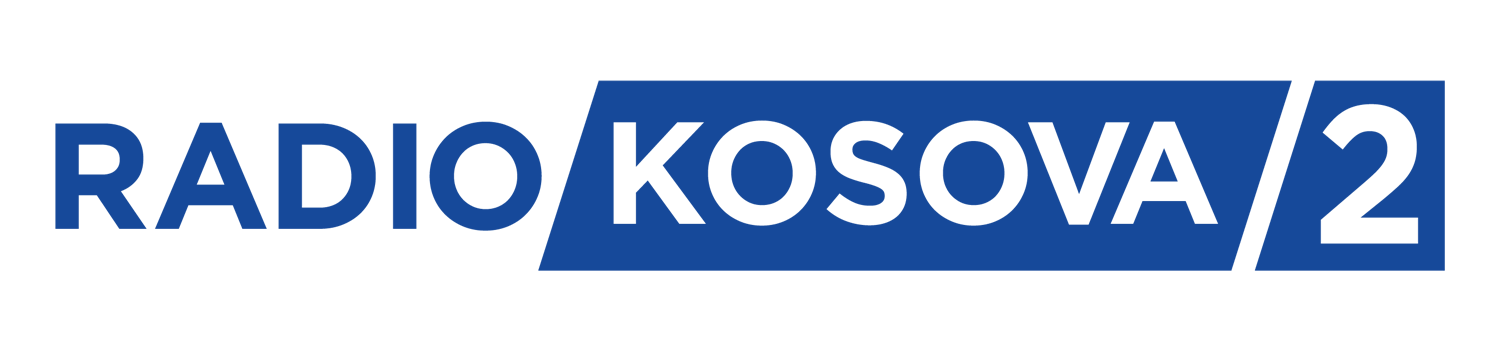
The logo of Radio Kosova 2 from 2013

== See also ==
- List of radio stations in Kosovo
- Television in Kosovo
