= Mojo HD =

Ownership
- Owner: In Demand LLC. (Comcast In Demand Holdings, Inc., Cox Communications Holdings Inc., & Charter Communications)
- Sister channels: In Demand, Hot Choice

History
- Launched: September 2003; 22 years ago (as INHD)
- Closed: December 1, 2008; 17 years ago (as linear channel)
- Former names: INHD

Links
- Website: www.mojohd.com

Mojo HD was an American VOD television channel, owned by In Demand LLC. As a linear television channel, it replaced INHD on May 1, 2007. In Demand, the owner of Mojo HD, canceled its Mojo HD regularly scheduled programming on December 1, 2008, but continued to provide video on demand programming and sales of their programs on optical media.

== Overview ==
The channel is owned by In Demand L.L.C. On January 1, 2007, In Demand ceased operations of INHD2 (stylized as "INHD^{2}"), and in May, renamed INHD "Mojo HD" as a non-pay per view 24-hour basic cable channel. Until December 1, 2008, Mojo HD was available on Bright House Networks, Cablevision, Charter, Comcast, Cox, Time Warner Cable, Mediacom, and Midcontinent cable systems. The network had broadcast all content in high definition 1080i format and 5.1 audio to cable subscribers with HD service, usually at no additional charge. The channel featured original programming, movies and sports programming geared to the lifestyle interests of affluent males; its website (www.mojohd.com) continues to feature streaming episodes, interactive forums, and a store for its content on DVD. Mojo HD programming also continues on other digital platforms such as iTunes, Amazon.com, Hulu and others.

== Programming ==
Mojo HD aired original programming series such as After Hours with Daniel, Three Sheets, I Bet You, Pressure Cook, Wall Street Warriors, Bobby G: Adventure Capitalist, Start-Up Junkies, Dr. Danger, The King of Miami, The Show, Technology Jones, and Uncorked with Billy Merritt. Other shows include London Live, Getting Abroad, Hooked, Timeless and Beer Nutz.

Mojo HD aired select NBA TV games in HD, when many cable providers did not yet carry NBA TV HD; games were blacked out on systems which did not carry NBA TV, or if the game aired in a team's market, where the team's broadcaster received preference. Some cable systems used Mojo HD for RSN HD over flow feeds.

The channel acquired the off-network rights for Heroes in high definition starting in October 2007, and aired several episodes leading up to the network premiere in September 2008. G4 later took both the regular broadcast and HD rights, as their HD channel launched on the day Mojo HD ended operations.
