= Pla =

Pla may refer to:

== People ==
- Cecilio Plá (1860–1934), Spanish painter
- Conrad Pla (born 1966), Canadian kickboxer and actor
- Jim Pla (born 1992), French racing driver
- Joan Baptista Pla (ca. 1720–1773), Spanish composer and oboist
- José María Plá (1794-1869), Uruguayan politician, interim President in 1856
- Josefina Pla (1903–1999), Spanish writer
- Josep Pla (composer) (ca. 1728–1762)
- Josep Pla (1897–1981), Spanish journalist and writer
- Manuel Pla (ca. 1725–1766), Spanish composer
- Marylin Pla (born 1984), French skater
- Olivier Pla (born 1981), French racing driver
- Oriol Pla (born 1993), Catalan actor
- Rodrigo Plá (born 1968), Mexican screenwriter

== Places ==
- El Pla del Penedès, a municipality in the comarca of Alt Penedès, Spain
- El Pla de Santa Maria, a municipality in the comarca of the Alt Camp, Spain
- Le Pla, a commune in southwestern France
- Pla d'Urgell, a comarca in Catalonia, Spain

== See also ==
- PLA (disambiguation)
- Plas (disambiguation)
