= Plas =

Plas or Plass may refer to:

== People ==
- Plas Johnson (born 1931), American saxophonist
- Adrian Plass (born 1948), British author who writes primarily Christian humor
- Gilbert Plass (1920–2004), Canadian-born physicist
- Jennifer Plass (born 1985), German field hockey player
- Maria Plass (born 1953), Swedish Moderate Party politician
- Thierry Plas (born 1959), Belgian guitarist, producer and composer
- Reuben H. Plass, creator of the 1897 Plass automobile

== Other ==
- Plas (song), a song by Albanian composer Flori Mumajesi
- Plass, an American automobile manufactured only in 1897
- Roald Dahl Plass, referred to as "The Plas", site of the Wales Millennium Centre in Cardiff

== See also ==
- Michel Plasse (1948–2006), Canadian ice hockey goaltender
- Pla (disambiguation), for the singular of Plas
- PLA (disambiguation), for the singular of PLAs
- Place (disambiguation)
- Plaz
