= List of awards and nominations received by Flori Mumajesi =

The List of awards and nominations received by Flori Mumajesi refers to the awards and nominations which were received by Albanian composer, singer and songwriter Flori Mumajesi.

== Balkan Music Awards ==
The Balkan Music Awards is an award ceremony organized by Balkanika TV celebrating the most successful in music from the Balkan countries. Flori has won three awards from four nominations.

Year	Nominated work	Award	Result
2009	"Playback"	Best Song from Albania	Won
2009	"Playback"	Best Song from Balkans	Nominated
2011	"Origjinale"	Best Song from Albania	Won
2011	"Origjinale"	Best Song from Balkans	Won

== Kënga Magjike ==
Kënga Magjike is an annual competition, which has been broadcast every year since its debut in 1999, and the second longest-running television competition in Albania. Flori has participated seven times since its debut in 2003 and has won several awards. His first victory as a singer was in 2018 though he was additionally the composer of the winning entries "Hape Vetën" by Aurela Gaçe in 2007 and "Ma Zgjat Dorën" by Eneda Tarifa in the following 2019.

Year	Nominated work	Award	Result
2003	"Merrmë Të Fundit Natë" (feat. Alketa Vejsiu)	Best Video	Won
2004	"Gjithmonë Do Jem Me Ty"	Best Performer	Won
2005	"Me Sy Mbyllur"	Songwriter Prize	Won
2007	"Fluturimi 3470" (feat. Soni Malaj)	Hit Song	Won
2007	"Fluturimi 3470" (feat. Soni Malaj)	Second Prize	Won
2007	"Hape Vetën" (by Aurela Gaçe)	First Prize (As Composer)	Won
2009	"Play Back"	Hit Song	Won
2015	"Me Fjale Të Vogla"	Best Artist on Web	Won
2018	"Plas"	Best Ballad	Won
2018	"Plas"	First Prize	Won
2019	"Ma Zgjat Dorën" (by Eneda Tarifa)	First Prize (As Composer)	Won

award do not exist

== Top Fest ==
Year	Nominee / work	Award	Result
2011	"Tallava"	Internet Prize	Won

Year	Nominee / work	Award	Result
2016	"Gone Girl (ft 2po2)"	Collaboration of the Year	Nominated
2016	"Gone Girl (ft 2po2)"	Song of the Year	Nominated
2016	"Flori Mumajesi"	Male Artist of the Year	Nominated

== Videofest ==
Year	Nominee / work	Award	Result
2007	"Flori feat. Tingulli 3'nt. - Njëherë në jetë"	Best R&B Video	Won
2007	"Flori feat. Tingulli 3'nt. - Njëherë në jetë"	Best Video / First Prize	Nominated
2007	"Flori feat. Tingulli 3'nt. - Njëherë në jetë"	Best Editing	Nominated
2007	"Flori feat. Tingulli 3'nt. - Njëherë në jetë"	Best Production	Nominated
2012	"Flori ft. Albatrit Muqiqi & Noga – Tequila Vava"	The most views video on YouTube	Won
2012	"Flori ft. Albatrit Muqiqi & Noga – Tequila Vava"	Best Pop Folk Video	Nominated
2013	"Pa jete"	Best Video / First Prize	Won
2013	"Pa jete"	Best Male	Won
2013	"Pa jete"	Best Ballad	Won
2013	"Pa jete"	Best Director	Nominated
2013	"Pa jete"	Best Performance	Nominated
2014	"Flori Ft. Kaos - Lule Lule"	Best Director	Nominated

== Zhurma Show Awards ==
Year	Nominee / work	Award	Result
2012	"Me zemer"	Best Pop	Nominated
2013	"Pa jete"	Best Performer	Nominated
2014	"Ke"	Best Dance	Nominated
2014	"Ta boja me drita"	Best Pop	Nominated
2015	"Flori Mumajesi ft. Dj Vicky- Nallane"	Best Pop	Nominated
