= Flori Mumajesi discography =

- Studio albums: 1
- Singles: 30

This article features the discography of Albanian composer, singer and songwriter Flori Mumajesi. Mumajesi's discography includes a studio albums and numerous singles as a lead artist and featured artist.

== Albums ==
=== Studio albums ===
Title	Details
Detaj	Released: 7 August 2011; Label: Super Sonic; Format: CD, digital download

== Singles ==
=== As lead artist ===
Title	Year	Peak chart positions	Album
Title	Year	ALB	Album
"Fluturimi 3470" (featuring Soni Malaj)	2007	—	Detaj
"Playback"	2009	—	Detaj
"Crazy Girl" (featuring 2po2)	2010	—	Detaj
"Tallava"	2011	—	Detaj
"Tequila vava" (featuring Albatrit Muçiqi)	2011	—	Detaj
"S'të mbaj inat" (featuring Labi)	2012	—	Non-album single
"Gjithë jetën" (featuring 2po2)	2012	—	Non-album single
"Me zemër"	2012	—	Non-album single
"Pa jetë"	2013	—	Non-album single
"Jo vetëm fjalë" (featuring Gena)	2013	—	Non-album single
"Lule Lule" (featuring KAOS)	2013	—	Non-album single
"Ke"	2014	—	Non-album single
"Ta boja me drita"	2014	—	Non-album single
"Ku isha une" (featuring Argjentina Ramosaj)	2014	—	Non-album single
"Nallane" (featuring Dj Vicky)	2015	—	Non-album single
"Me fjalë të vogla"	2015	—	Non-album single
"Beautiful" (featuring Ledri Vula)	2016	1	Non-album single
"Nallane 2" (featuring Dj Vicky)	2016	—	Non-album single
"Në shpirt" (featuring Elinel)	2017	21	Non-album single
"Nallane 3" (featuring Arilena Ara & Dj Vicky)	2017	—	Non-album single
"Karma" (featuring Bruno, Klajdi & Dj Vicky)	2017	1	Non-album single
"Shanghai" (featuring Dj Vicky)	2018	—	Non-album single
"Plas"	2018	—	Non-album single
"Mori" (featuring Ghetto Geasy & Bruno)	2018	1	Non-album single
"Thjesth të du"	2019	29	Non-album single
"Dhemb"	2020	21	Non-album single
"—" denotes a recording that did not chart or was not released in that territory.

=== As featured artist ===
Title	Year	Peak chart positions	Album
Title	Year	ALB	Album
"Baby" (Ghetto Geasy featuring Flori)	2007	—	Non-album single
"Crazy Girl" (2po2 featuring Flori)	2009	—	Non-album single
"Ne e krayat" (Alisia featuring Flori	2010	—	Non-album single
"Vajno li ti e?" (Alisia featuring Flori)	2010	—	Non-album single
"I ngjan asaj" (Evi Reçi featuring Flori)	2010	—	Non-album single
"Ani ani syn" (Tingulli 3nt featuring Flori)	2011	—	Non-album single
"Ne se pravi (Tallava)" (Stefani featuring Flori))	2014	—	Non-album single
"Lutem une sot" (Klajdi Haruni featuring Flori)	2014	—	Non-album single
"Kuq e zi je ti" (Elvana Gjata featuring Flori)	2015	—	Non-album single
"All In" (Besa featuring Flori)	2015	—	Non-album single
"Gone Girl" (2po2 featuring Flori)	2016	11	Non-album single
"123" (Besa featuring Flori)	2016	8	Non-album single
"Nuk ma la" (Ledri Vula featuring Flori)	2016	2	Non-album single
"Tu luta" (Shkurte Gashi featuring Flori)	2016	—	Non-album single
"Si dikur" (Shkurte Gashi featuring Flori)	2017	—	Non-album single
"Trëndafil" (Dhurata Dora featuring Flori)	2018	1	Non-album single
"Dashni me raki" (Ghetto Geasy featuring Flori)	2018	2	Non-album single
"Doja" (Arilena Ara featuring Flori)	2019	—	Non-album single
"—" denotes a recording that did not chart or was not released in that territory.

== Videography ==
=== As lead artist ===
Title	Year	Album	Director(s)	Ref.
"Ke"	2014	Non-album single	Unknown	
"Ta Boja Me Drita"	2014	Non-album single	Himself	
"Jo Vetem Fjalë"	2014	Non-album single	Unknown	
"Ku Isha Unë" (feat. Argjentina Ramosaj)	2014	Non-album single	Himself	
"Nallane" (feat. Dj Vicky)	2015	Non-album single	Unknown	
"Beautiful" (feat. Ledri Vula)	2016	Non-album single	Unknown	
"Nallane 2" (feat. Dj Vicky)	2016	Non-album single	Unknown	
"Në Shpirt" (feat. Elinel)	2017	Non-album single	Unknown	
"Nallane 3" (feat. Arilena Ara & Dj Vicky)	2017	Non-album single	Unknown	
"Karma" (feat. Bruno, Klajdi & Dj Vicky)	2017	Non-album single	Unknown	
"Shanghai" (feat. Dj Vicky)	2018	Non-album single	Unknown	
"Mori" (feat. Ghetto Geasy & Bruno)	2018	Non-album single	Unknown	
"Thjesht Të Du"	2019	Non-album single	Unknown	

=== As featured artist ===
Title	Year	Album	Director(s)	Ref.
"Baby" (feat. Ghetto Geasy)	2007	Non-album single	Unknown	
"Crazy Girl" (feat. 2po2)	2009	Non-album single	Unknown	
"Ne E Krayat" (feat. Alisia	2010	Non-album single	Unknown	
"Vajno Li Ti E?" (feat. Alisia)	2010	Non-album single	Unknown	
"I Ngjan Asaj" (feat. Evi Reçi)	2010	Non-album single	Himself	
"Ani Ani Syn" (feat. Tingulli 3nt)	2011	Non-album single	Unknown	
"Ne Se Pravi (Tallava)" (feat. Stefani))	2014	Non-album single	Unknown	
"Lutem une sot" (feat. Klajdi Haruni)	2014	Non-album single	Unknown	
"Kuq E Zi Je Ti" (feat. Elvana Gjata)	2015	Non-album single	Unknown	
"All In" (feat. Besa)	2015	Non-album single	Unknown	
"Gone Girl" (feat. 2po2)	2016	Non-album single	Unknown	
"123" (feat. Besa)	2016	Non-album single	Unknown	
"Nuk Ma La" (feat. Ledri Vula)	2016	Non-album single	Unknown	
"Tu Luta" (feat. Shkurte Gashi)	2016	Non-album single	Unknown	
"Si Dikur" (feat. Shkurte Gashi)	2017	Non-album single	Unknown	
"Trëndafil" (feat. Dhurata Dora)	2018	Non-album single	Unknown	
"Dashni Me Raki" (feat. Ghetto Geasy)	2018	Non-album single	Unknown	

== See also ==
- Flori Mumajesi production discography
