= Flori Mumajesi production discography =

The following list is a partial discography of production by Flori Mumajesi, an Albanian composer, producer, singer and songwriter, which includes music he produced and co-produced.

== Selected production discography ==
=== Albanian–speaking Europe ===
Title	Artist	Year	Songwriter	Producer	Music	Ref.
"Afër dhe Larg"	Elvana Gjata		check	check		
"Kudo Që Jam"	Elvana Gjata			check	check	
"Gjaku Im"	Elvana Gjata			check	check	
"1990"	Elvana Gjata ft. MC Kresha			check	check	
"123"	Besa feat. Flori	2016	check	—N/a	—N/a	
"Beautiful"	Flori feat. Ledri Vula	2016	check	—N/a	—N/a	
"Nuk Ma La"	Ledri Vula feat. Flori	2016	check	—N/a	check	
"Lejla"	Elvana Gjata feat. Capital T and 2po2	2016	check	—N/a	check	
"Mirmëngjes Dashni"	Artjola Toska feat. Bruno	2016	check	check	—N/a	
"Duam"	Tuna	2016	check	check	—N/a	
"Nallane 2"	Flori feat. Dj Vicky	2016	check	—N/a	check	
"Tu Luta"	Shkurte Gashi feat. Flori	2016	check	—N/a	check	
"Kokëfortë"	Besa	2017	check	—N/a	check	
"Në Shpirt"	Flori feat. Elinel	2017	check	—N/a	check	
"Karma"	Flori feat. Bruno, Klajdi Haruni and Dj Vicky	2017	—N/a	—N/a	check	
"Si Dikur"	Shkurte Gashi feat. Mumajesi	2017	check	—N/a	check	
"Shanghai"	Flori feat. Dj Vicky	2018	—N/a	—N/a	check	
"Trëndafil"	Dhurata Dora feat. Flori	2018	check	—N/a	check	
"Dashni Me Raki"	Ghetto Geasy feat. Flori	2018	check	—N/a	check	
"Digjem"	Bruno ft. Artjola Toska	2018	check	—N/a	check	
"Më Ke Mua"	Kejsi Tola	2018	check	—N/a	check	
"Nuk Të Dua Dot Më Pak"	Klajdi Haruni	2018	check	—N/a	check	
"Ja Ke Bo Vetës"	Bruno feat. Flori	2018	check	—N/a	check	
"Plas"	Flori	2018	check	—N/a	check	
"Mori"	Flori feat. Ghetto Geasy and Bruno	2018	check	—N/a	check	
"Dashuria"	Flori	2019	check	—N/a	check	
"Jeten Tënde"	Shkurte Gashi feat. Bruno	2019	check	—N/a	check	
"Thjesht Të Du"	Flori	2019	check	—N/a	check	
"Ma Zgjat Dorën"	Eneda Tarifa	2019	check	check	check	

=== Bulgaria ===
Title	Artist	Year	Music	Ref.
"Doseshtay Se Sam"	Emanuela	2010	check	
"Nishto Ne Znaesh"	Emanuela	2010	check	
"Na Ti Mi Govori"	Alisia	2011	check	
"Stoi Daleche"	Emanuela	2012	check	
"Tuk Do Men"	Andrea	2012	check	
"Popitay Za Men"	Emanuela	2013	check	

=== Greece ===
Title	Artist	Year	Music	Ref.
"Μπέμπα"	Tus	2017	check	
"Ταξίδι Μαγικό"	Christina Salti feat. Ilias Vrettos	2019	check	
"Ρίξε Με"	Ivi Adamou	2022	check	

=== Serbia ===
Title	Artist	Year	Music	Ref.
"Ne Stiže Me Kajanje"	Dunja Ilić	2011	check	

=== Turkey ===
Title	Artist	Year	Music	Ref.
"Dileğim Aşk"	Serdar Ortaç	2012	check	
"Konuş Yüzüme"	Serdar Ortaç	2015	check	

== See also ==
- Flori Mumajesi discography
- Flori Mumajesi videography
