= Artigues, Ariège =

Commune in Occitanie, France

Artigues
- Commune
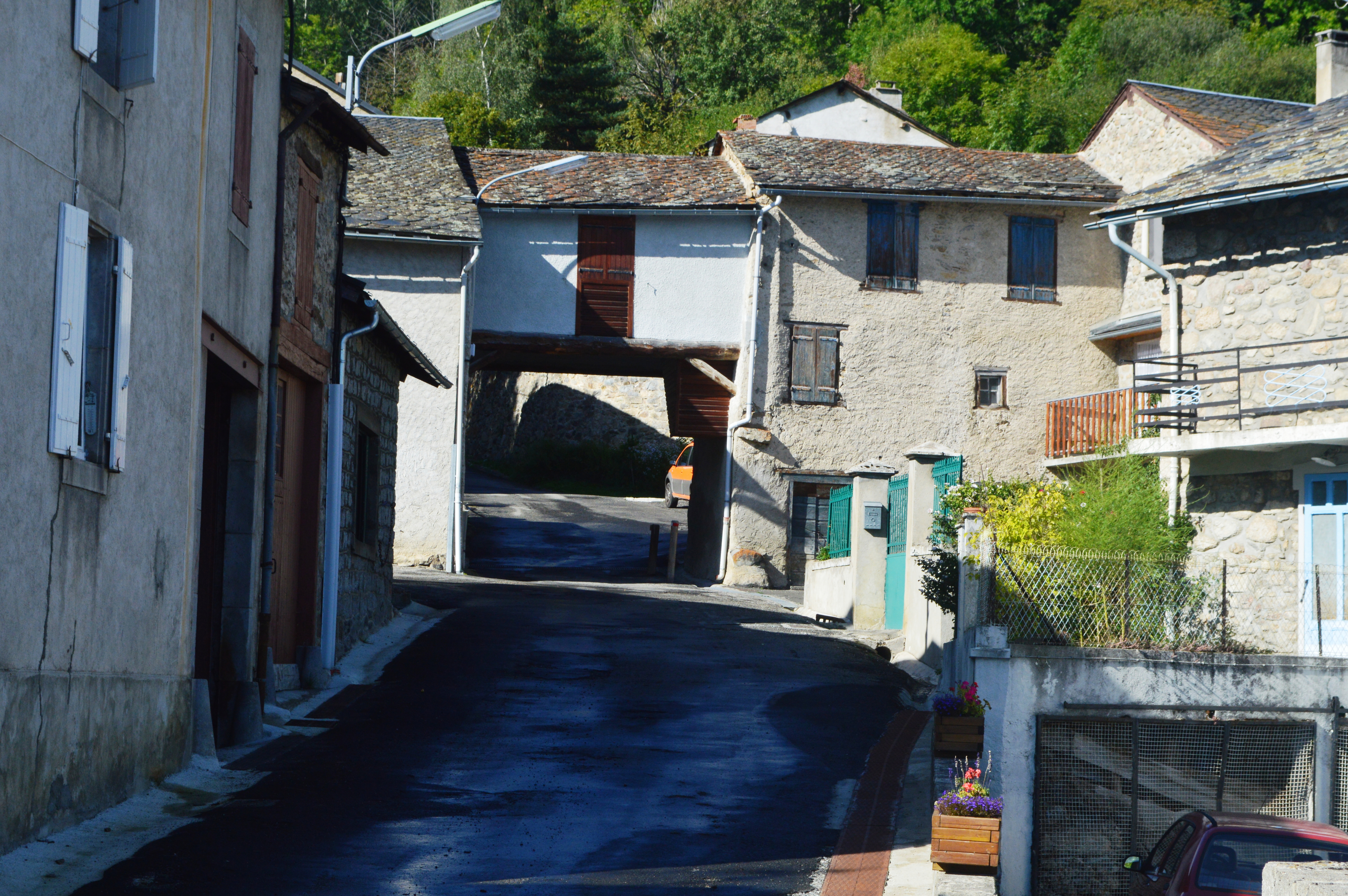
- A street in Artigues
- Location of Artigues
- Location within France Location within Occitanie
- Coordinates: 42°43′07″N 2°04′11″E
- Country: France
- Region: Occitania
- Department: Ariège
- Arrondissement: Foix
- Canton: Haute-Ariège
- Intercommunality: CC Haute-Ariège

Government
  - Mayor (2020–2026): Jean-Luc Annouilles
- Area^{1}: 12.43 km^{2} (4.80 sq mi)
- Elevation: 1,100 m (3,600 ft)
- Highest elevation: 2,547 m (8,356 ft)
- Lowest elevation: 990 m (3,250 ft)
- Population (2023): 30
  - Density: 2.4/km^{2} (6.3/sq mi)
- Time zone: UTC+01:00 (CET)
  - Summer (DST): UTC+02:00 (CEST)
- INSEE/Postal code: 09020 /09460
- ^{1} French Land Register data, which excludes lakes, ponds, glaciers > 1 km^{2} (0.386 sq mi or 247 acres) and river estuaries.

Artigues (French pronunciation: [aʁtiɡ]; Occitan: Artigas) is a commune in the Ariège department, region of Occitania, southwestern France.

== Geography ==
Artigues is a remote mountain commune some 25 km south by south-west of Quillan and 20 km east of Ax-les-Thermes in a direct line. The D16 road from Rouze to Le Pla passes through the north-eastern corner of the commune but has no access to the commune. Access to the village is by a small mountain road, Laoutre, from Mijanès in the north-west. The commune is extremely rugged and heavily forested with alpine vegetation below the snow line. There is some farming activity near the village.

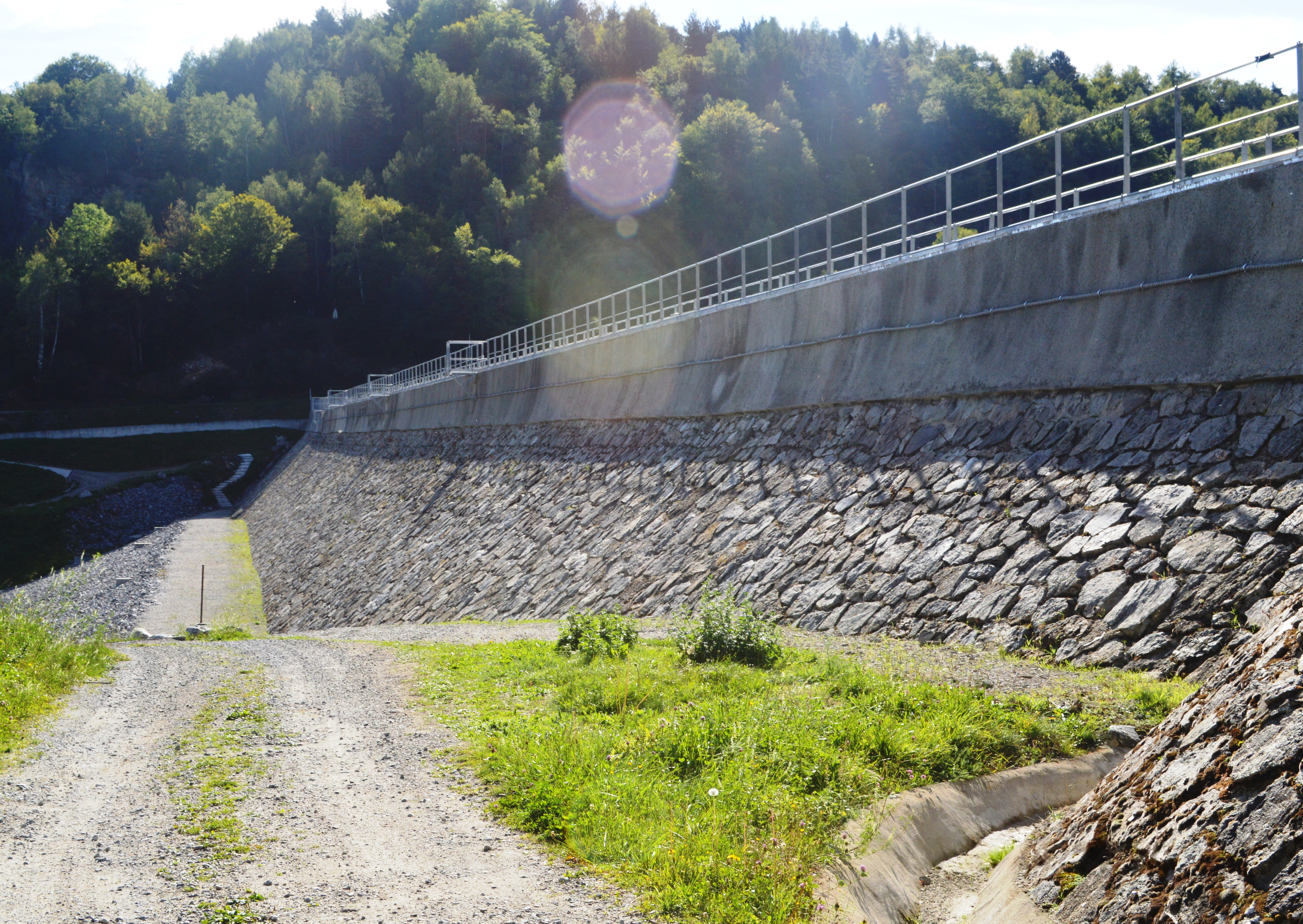
The Noubais Dam

The Ruisseau de Boutadieu forms the south-eastern border of the commune and flows north to join the Ruisseau d'Artigues which forms the rest of the eastern border as it flows north to join the Quérigut River just north of the commune. The Ruisseau de Laurenti rises in the south of the commune and flows north into the Étang de Laurenti in the south-centre of the commune. From there it continues east to join the Ruisseau de Boutadieu. The Ruisseau de Fournet rises in the centre of the commune and flows north to join the Bruyante west of the commune. The Barrage de Noubais is on the northern border of the commune and the stream flowing out of it forms the northern border as it flows north-east to join the Quérigut.

== Administration ==
List of Successive Mayors

From	To	Name
2001	2008	Édouard Macou
2008	2026	Jean-Luc Annouilles

== Demography ==
The inhabitants of the commune are known as Artiguois or Artiguoises in French.

Historical population

Year	Pop.	±% p.a.
1793	234	—
1821	287	+0.73%
1846	319	+0.42%
1872	376	+0.63%
1901	218	−1.86%
1926	139	−1.78%
1946	102	−1.54%
1962	67	−2.59%
1968	60	−1.82%

Year	Pop.	±% p.a.
1975	50	−2.57%
1982	29	−7.49%
1990	21	−3.95%
1999	38	+6.81%
2007	69	+7.74%
2012	48	−7.00%
2017	56	+3.13%
2023	30	−9.88%

Source: EHESS and INSEE

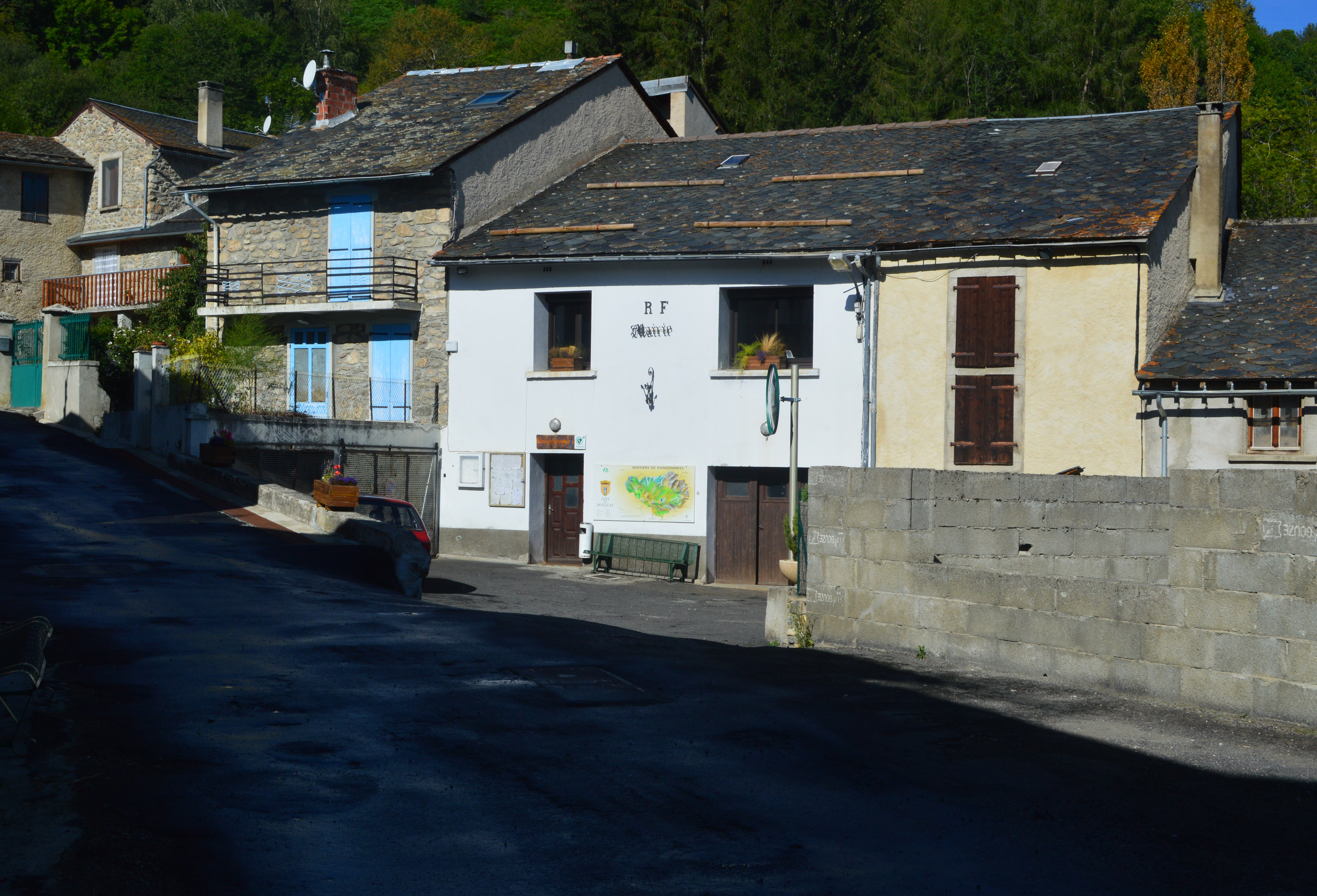
Artigues Town Hall

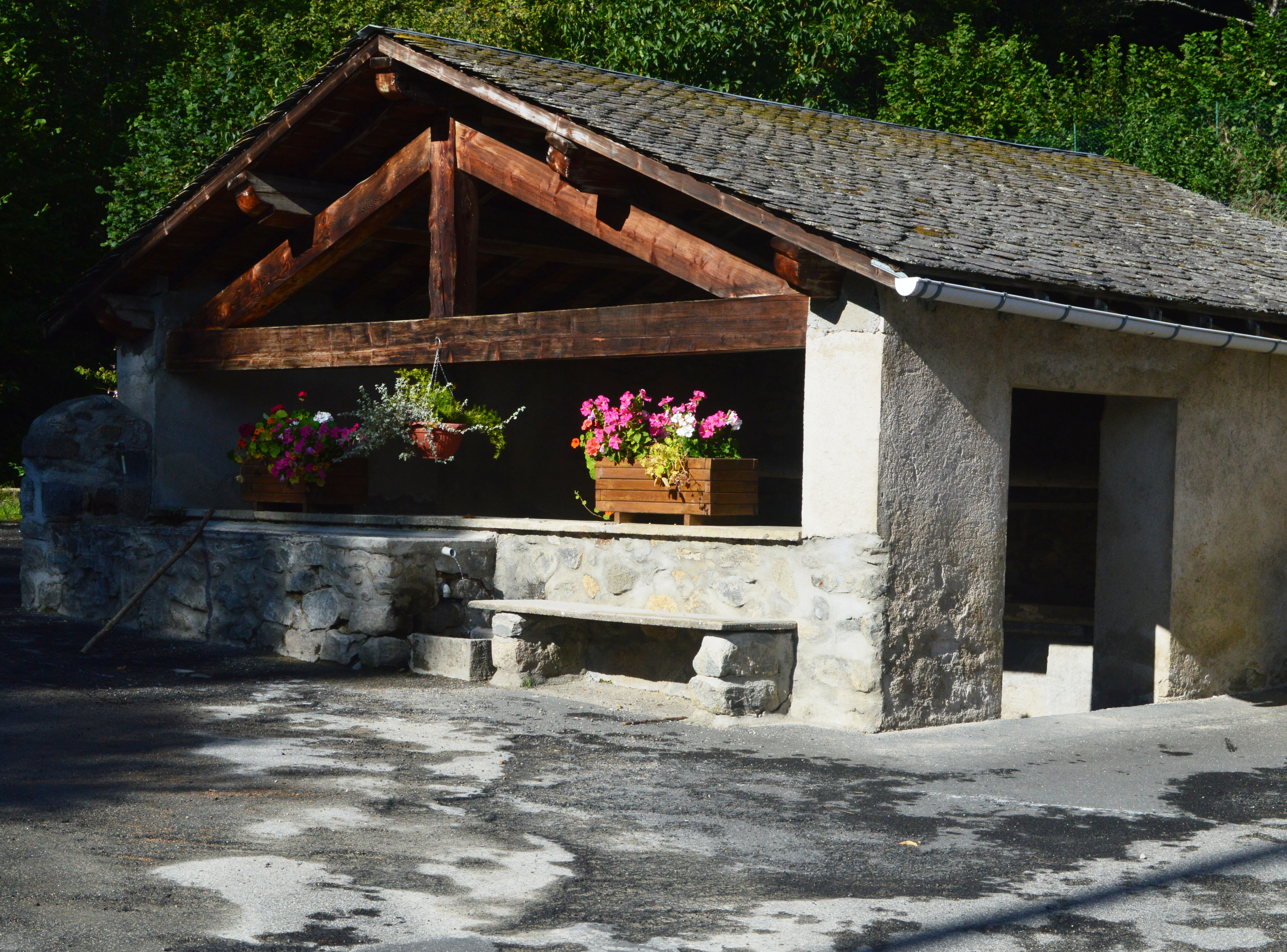
The Lavoir (Public Laundry)

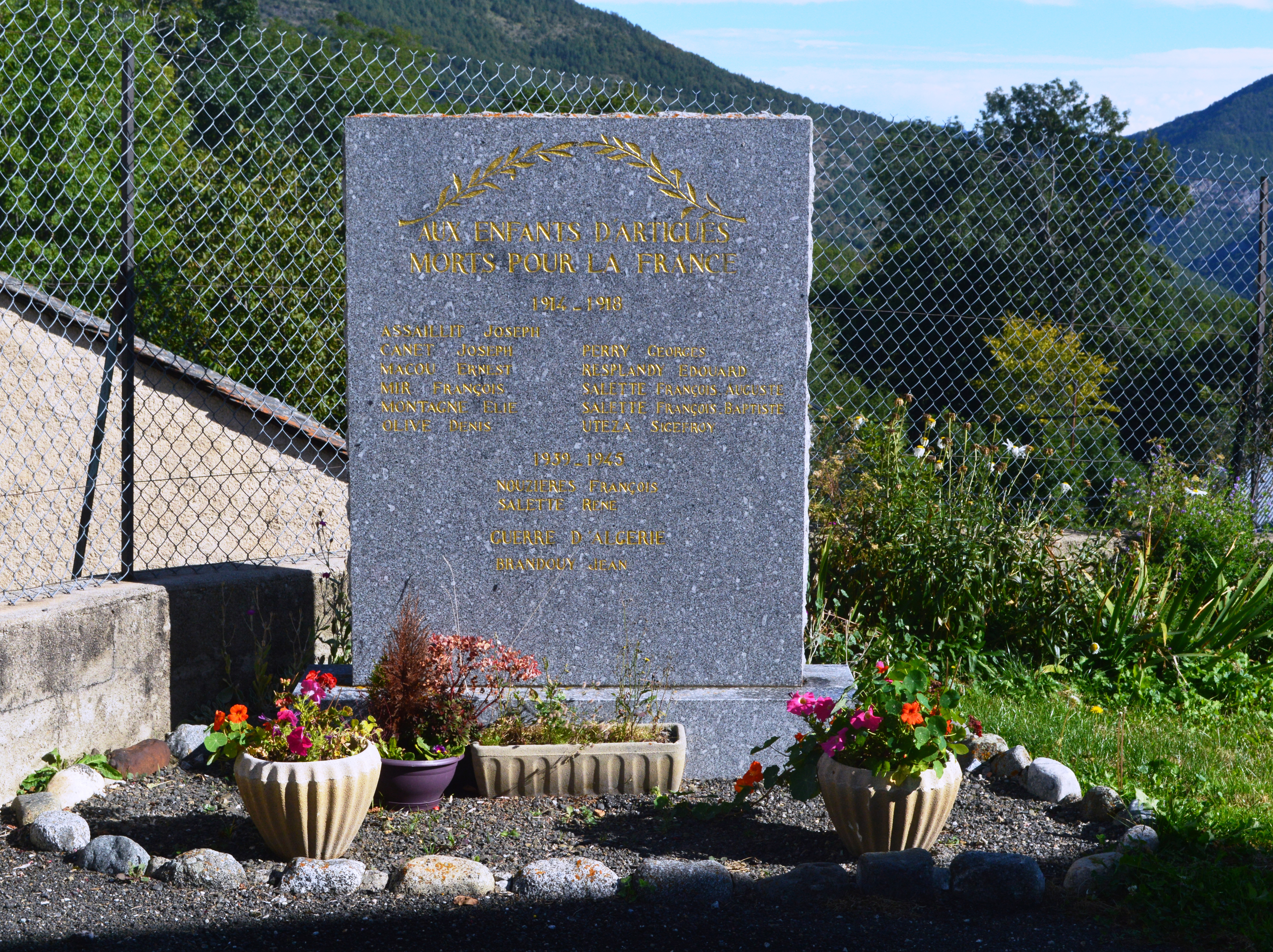
Artigues War Memorial

== Sites and monuments ==
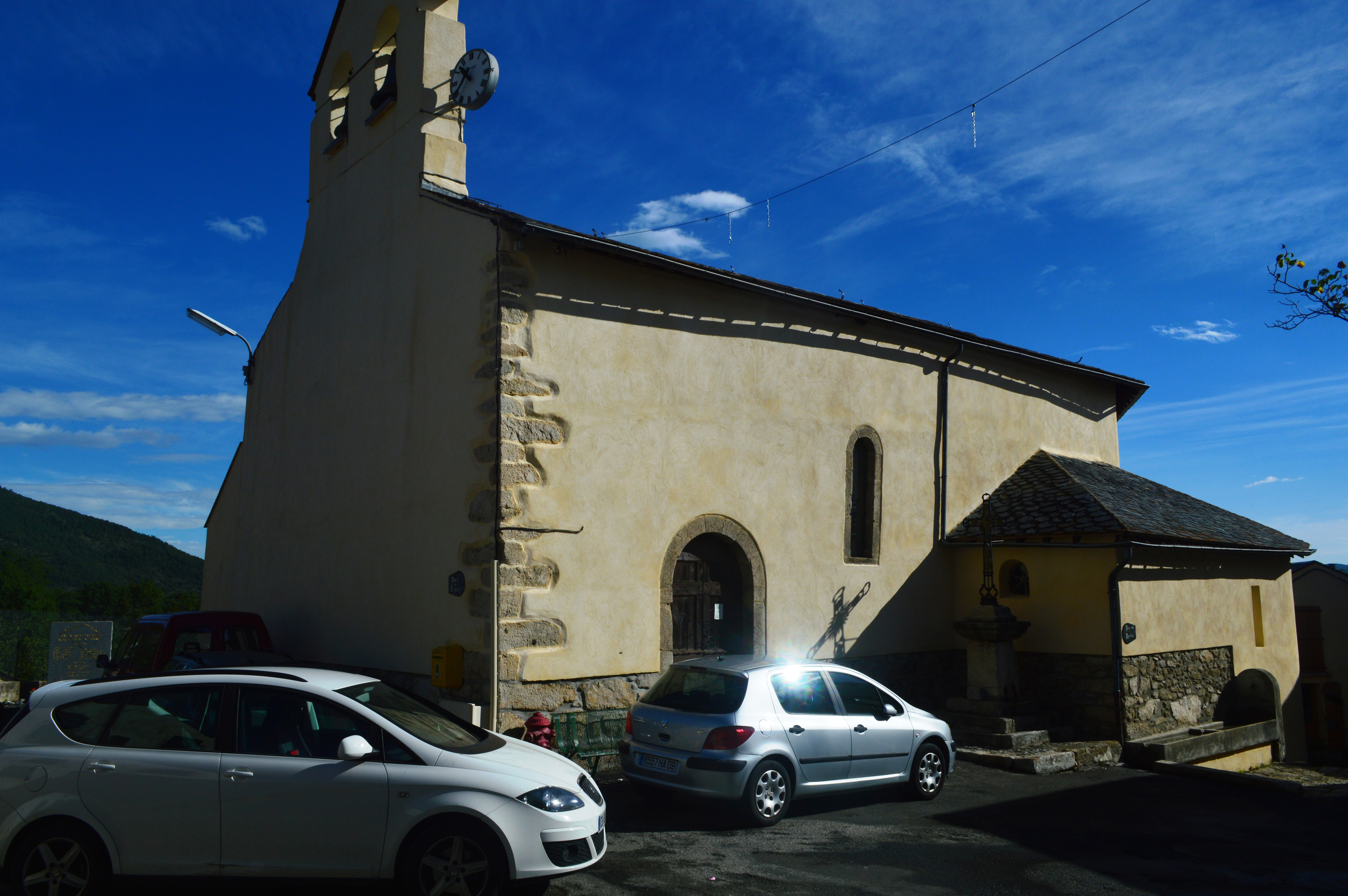
Artigues Church

In the Parish Church are several objects which are registered as historical objects:

- 2 Statues: Saint Just and Saint Pasteur (18th century)
- A Chalice (17th century)
- 6 Candlesticks (17th century)
- A Chandelier (18th century)

== See also ==
- Communes of the Ariège department
