= Mijanès =

Commune in Occitanie, France

- Commune
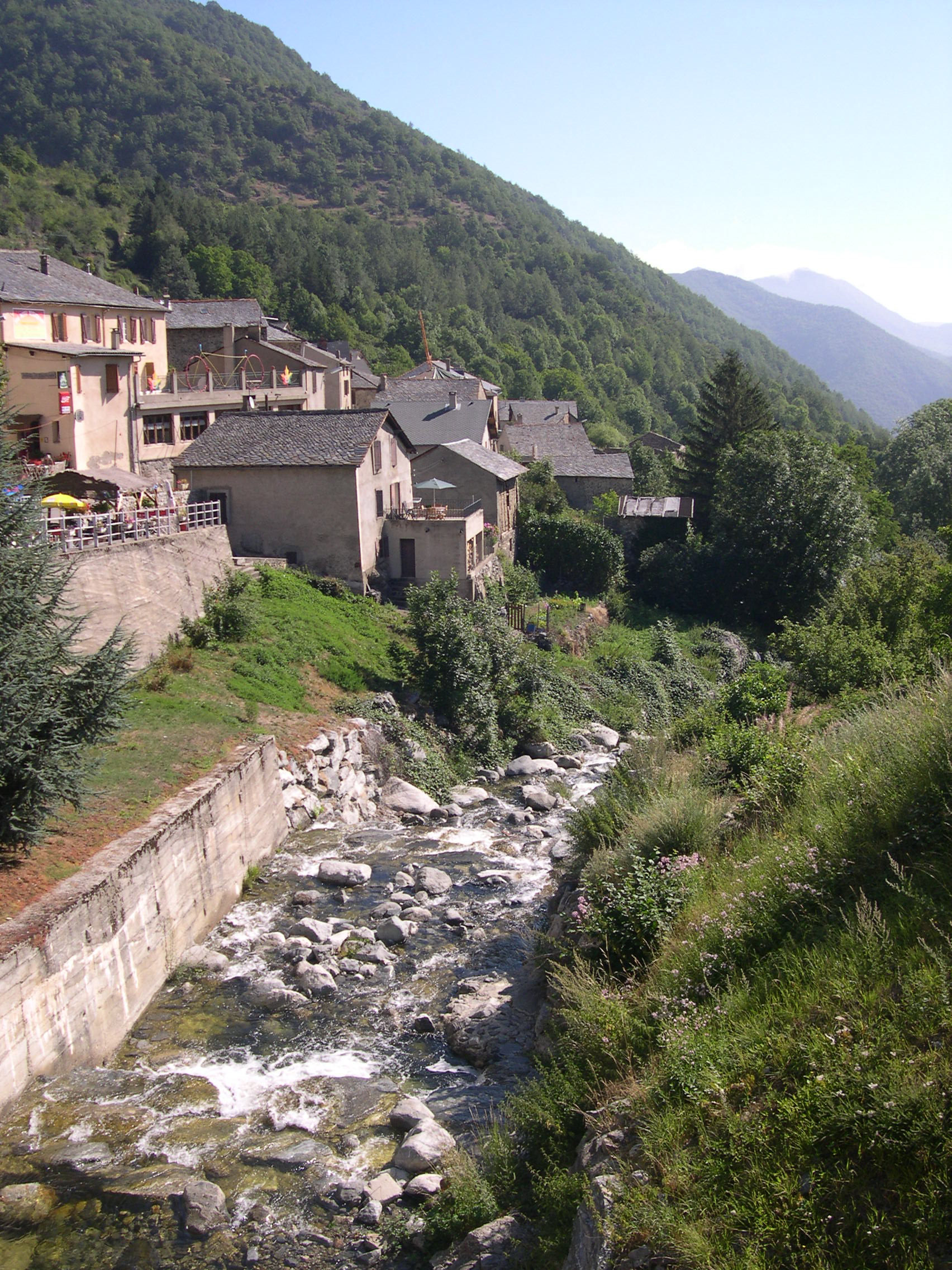
- The Bruyante river at Mijanès
- Location of Mijanès
- Location within France Location within Occitanie
- Coordinates: 42°43′54″N 2°03′25″E
- Country: France
- Region: Occitania
- Department: Ariège
- Arrondissement: Foix
- Canton: Haute-Ariège

Government
  - Mayor (2020–2026): Christian Dubuc
- Area^{1}: 39.95 km^{2} (15.42 sq mi)
- Elevation: 1,130 m (3,710 ft)
- Highest elevation: 2,541 m (8,337 ft)
- Lowest elevation: 1,037 m (3,402 ft)
- Population (2023): 56
  - Density: 1.4/km^{2} (3.6/sq mi)
- Time zone: UTC+01:00 (CET)
  - Summer (DST): UTC+02:00 (CEST)
- INSEE/Postal code: 09193 /09460
- ^{1} French Land Register data, which excludes lakes, ponds, glaciers > 1 km^{2} (0.386 sq mi or 247 acres) and river estuaries.

Mijanès (French pronunciation: [miʒanɛs]; Occitan: Mijanes) is a commune in the Ariège department in southwestern France. It is located close to two Cathar castles, the Château d'Usson and the Château de Quérigut.

During World War II, the villagers of Mijanès were involved in the rescue of six British airmen of the Royal Air Force after their plane crashed on the Pic de la Camisette, a nearby mountain, in December 1944. Wreckage of the plane is displayed today at the Château d'Usson.

== Population ==
Historical population
Year	Pop.	±% p.a.
1968	91	—
1975	71	−3.48%
1982	75	+0.79%
1990	79	+0.65%
1999	78	−0.14%
2007	91	+1.95%
2012	80	−2.54%
2017	59	−5.91%
2023	56	−0.87%
Source: INSEE

== Administration ==
From	To	Name	Party	Notes
March 1983	1995	Jean-Pierre Bel	Parti Socialiste (PS)	Regional Councillor, Midi-Pyrénées
March 1995	2001	Jean Jacques Resplandy	PS	
March 2001	2014	Christian Dubuc	PS	

== Landmarks and communities ==
=== Church of St John the Baptist ===
The church in Mijanès is dedicated to John the Baptist and dates from the 17th century. It was built in the Renaissance style and the façade was restored in 1965.

=== La Forge à la catalane ===
The community of la Forge à la catalane is located near to Mijanès by the River Bruyante and close to an area called la Mouline. It is so called because during the Middle Ages a forge operated at this location.

It is mentioned for the first time in 1714 when the Marquis d'Usson was authorized by King Louis XIV to build an ironworks there. The Mijanès forge was located by a river with a current strong enough to drive a water wheel to power industrial bellows and metalworking machinery. Because it was situated in the village, the water wheel was also used to run flour mills and a sawmill. The iron ore was brought up by mules from Rancié and possibly also the iron mines at Boutadiol. The iron was extracted from the ore by smelting with wood charcoal.

=== Cathar Castles ===
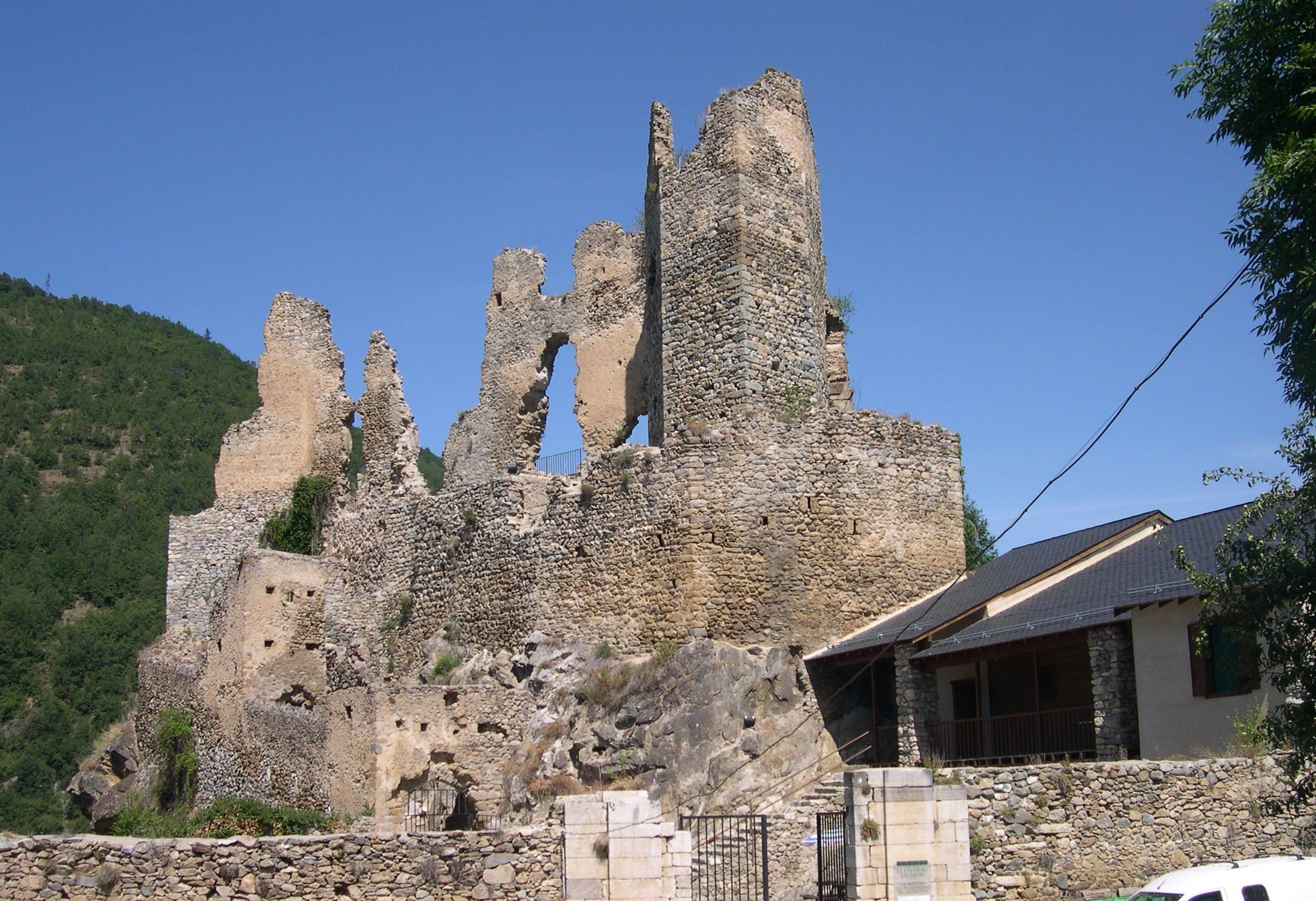
Château d'Usson

Near to Mijanès is the Château d'Usson, an 11th-century ruined fortification which was used for sanctuary by the Cathars towards the end of the wars against the Cathars. The village is also situated close to and the Château de Quérigut.

=== Les Orrys ===
A number of shepherds' huts (orrys) survive in the hills around the village. These structures enabled shepherds and farmers to take shelter without having to return to the village. These huts have through the years without much deterioration due to their quality and simplicity of construction. Although they are numerous, they are difficult to find without the assistance of a mountain guide.

=== Mijanès ski station ===
Mijanès Donezan ski station is at 1470 m-2000 m altitude, with 45 km of ski routes including 36 km of cross-country skiing and 10 alpine skiing pistes, and five ski lifts. It was founded in 1961 (M. Castilla, General Counsel).

=== Noubals ===
A hydroelectric dam is located at nearby Noubals. The facility also offers public access for leisure activities such as a fitness trail.

== Geography ==
The river running through the village is La Bruyante. Surrounding peaks include Pic de Balbonne (2305 m), Roc Blanc (2 546 m) and Pic de la Camisette. The Monegou cave, which was discovered in 1968, is a pit cave which reaches a depth of 324m.

== Notable people ==
The Abbot and geologist J. M. Durand, who was appointed at Montségur, carried out excavations in the area. His discoveries are housed in a museum in Paris. He was the attached to the château d'Usson. Jean-Pierre Bel, President of the French Senate from 2011, was a former mayor of Mijanès.

== 1944 Pic de la Camisette air crash ==
1944 Camisette Air Crash
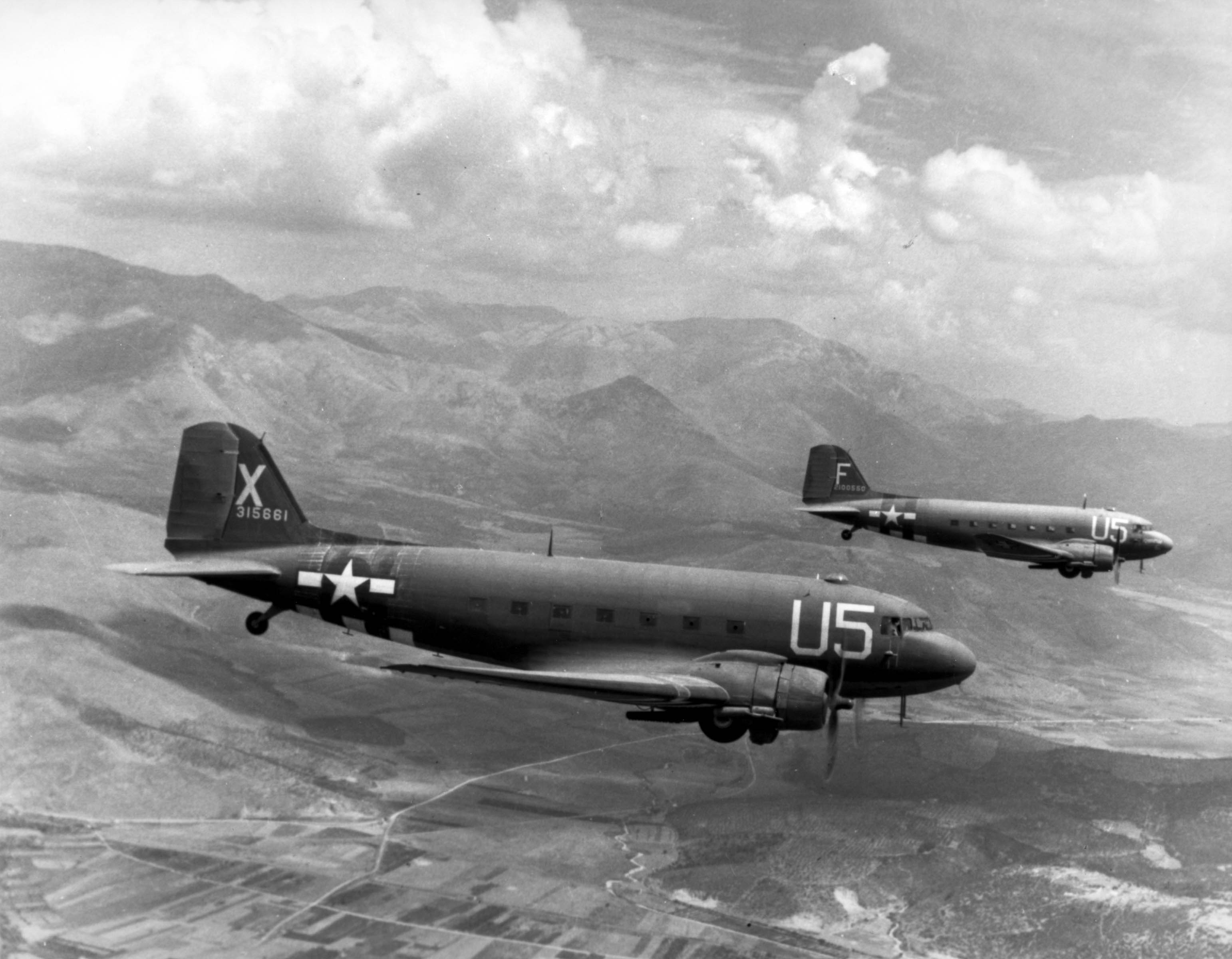
- USAAF C-47A Skytrains pictured in 1944, similar to the aircraft which crashed on Camisette

Accident
- Date: 5 December 1944
- Summary: adverse weather/unknown
- Site: Pic de la Camisette, France; 42.680613°N 2.002387°E

Aircraft
- Aircraft type: Dakota M.K.III aircraft (Douglas C-47)
- Operator: Royal Air Force
- Flight origin: RAF Northolt, United Kingdom
- Passengers: 20
- Crew: 3
- Fatalities: 18
- Injuries: 7
- Survivors: 6

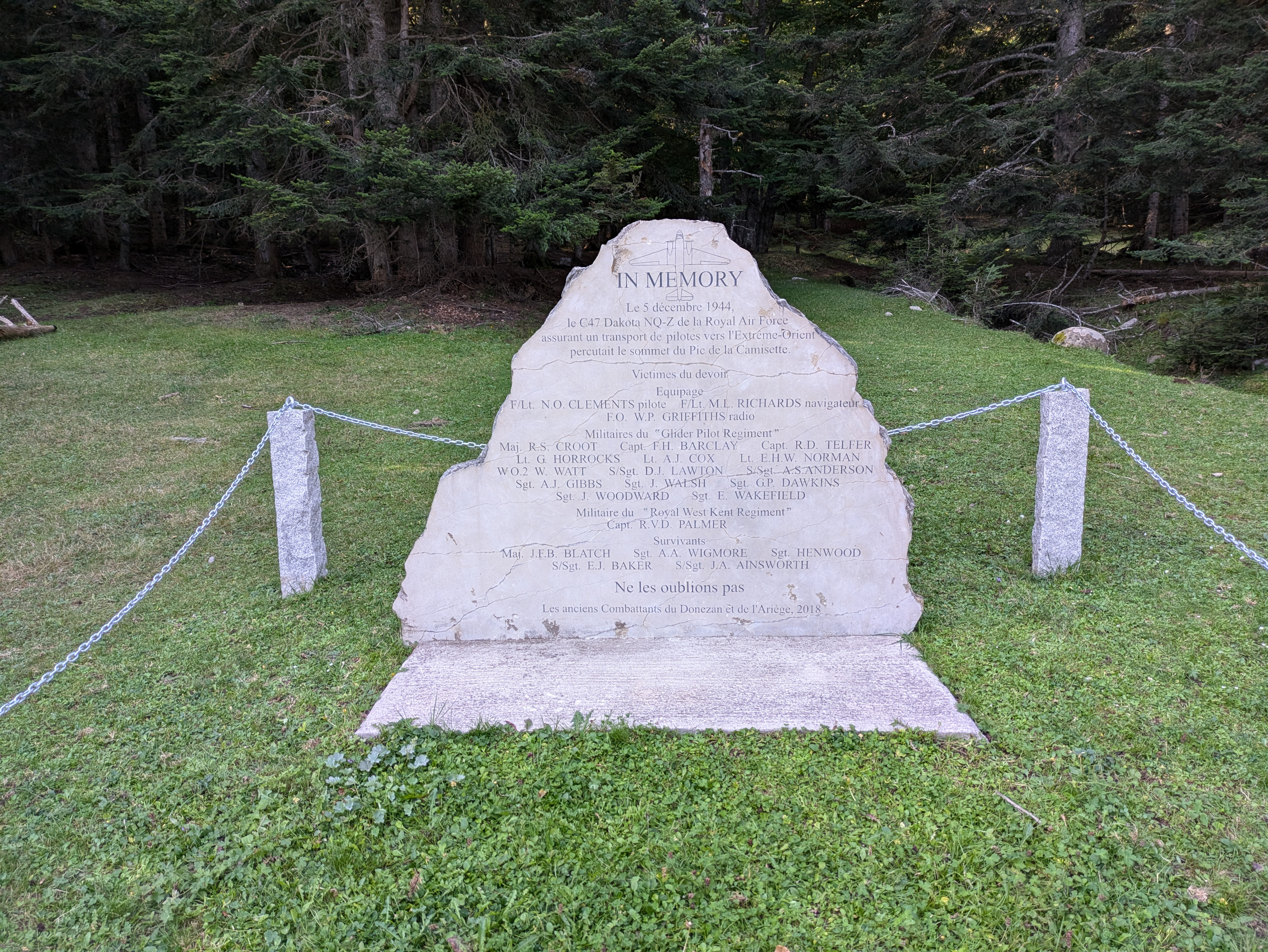
Memorial at the Plaine d'Artigues to the victims and survivors of the 1944 air crash on the nearby Pic de la Camisette.

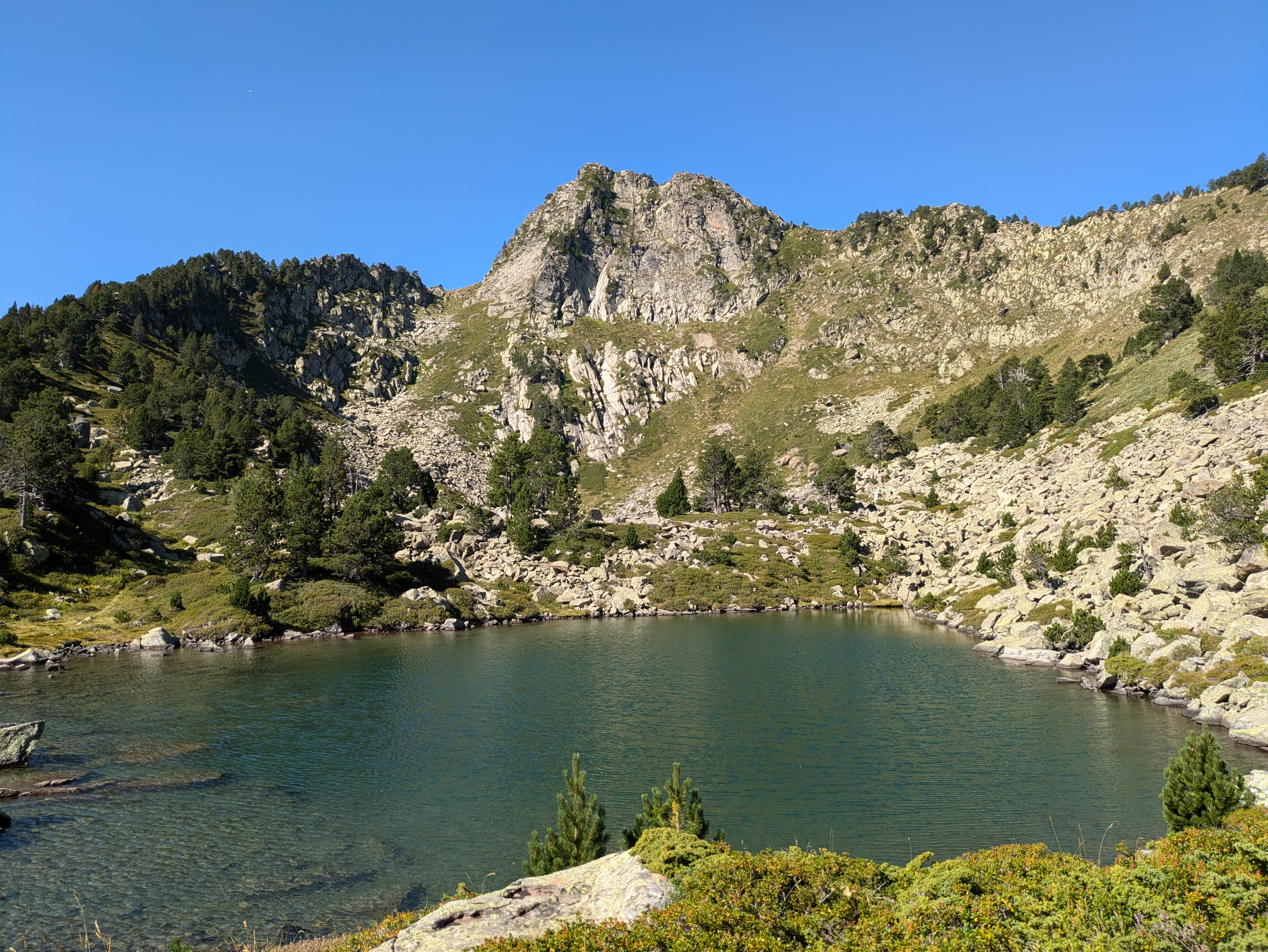
Pic de la Camisette. The air crash happened here. Remains of the plane were found at the foot of the cliffs directly below the summit. As at 2024, some remains were still there.

On 5 December 1944 a British Douglas Dakota III aircraft, serial number FL588, of the Royal Air Force crashed on the Pic de la Camisette, a mountain close to the commune of Mijanès, Ariège, in the French Pyrenees. It was on a military transport operation during World War II.

The Dakota was piloted by three RAF pilots. In total twenty-three airmen were on board, including twenty members of the Glider Pilot Regiment. Only six airmen survived the incident; sixteen died in the crash, another died within hours from his injuries. In spite of serious wounds, two of the survivors managed to reach the village of Mijanès to get help for the other survivors.

FL588 originated from RAF Northolt in West London. Two Dakota planes took off at 09:00 on 5 December on a course for Marseille transporting 20 glider pilots en route to India, who were trained to pilot Horsa and Hamilcar gliders to carry men and equipment.

Around 15:30 one of the Dakota aircraft crashed on the Pic de la Camisette (alt 2426m ), striking the north face above the Roc de la Musique before coming down facing south-east near a lake. The exact cause of the crash is not known, although it is known that the aircraft came down in a blizzard.

Seven pilots survived the crash initially, with varying degrees of injury but seven died during the night from injuries.

=== Rescue ===
The following morning, 6 December, the injured Blatch and Baker located Dawkins by following his cries of pain and attempted to bring him to shelter in the plane, but were unable to move him. In spite of having broken both his legs, Dawkins managed to drag himself towards the plane, where the other men gave him shelter in the wrecked fuselage. Blatch and Baker, who were barely able to walk, then went down into the valley to the village of Mijanès and sought help from the local inhabitants. A group of villagers from Mijanes formed a search party and went up to look for survivors, but were thwarted by nightfall and a fierce snowstorm. On 7 December, villagers from neighbouring Artigues retraced the steps of the two airmen and discovered the plane wreck on the Pic de la Camisette. Amid the wreckage they heard cries for help and found the officers Ainsworth, Henwood, Wigmore and Dawkins in the fuselage of the plane, alive but too severely injured to move. With great difficulty, the villagers carried the airmen down from the mountain, following the Barbouillère stream through the snow. The injured men were then taken from Le Pla by ambulance to Carcassonne hospital.

The bodies of eleven men were recovered from the crash site between 10 and 19 December, and buried in Mijanès. The search was suspended due to adverse weather conditions, but in the spring of 1945 a further six bodies were brought down from the crash site after the snow had melted. All of the airmen who died in the crash were later reburied in the Mazargues War Cemetery, Marseille.

=== Wreckage ===
Remains of Dakota FL 588 have been preserved and today are on display at the Château d'Usson, a ruined medieval Castle noted for its association with the Cathars.

== See also ==
- Communes of the Ariège department
- Fairy Lochs, a World War II crash site in Scotland
