= The X Factor 2013 =

The X Factor 2013 may refer to:

- X Factor (Albania season 3)
- The X Factor (Australia season 5)
- X-Faktor (series 4), Hungary
- X Factor Indonesia (season 1)
- X Factor (Italy series 7)
- The X Factor (New Zealand series 1)
- X Factor (Poland series 3)
- X Factor (Romania season 3)
- X Factor Adria (series 1), Serbia
- The X Factor (UK series 10)
- The X Factor (U.S. season 3)
