= Mlle Guédon de Presles =

French singer, composer and actress

Anne Madeleine Guédon de Presles, known as Mlle Guédon de Presles (early 18th century – c. 1754) was a French singer, composer and actress.

She was probably the daughter of Honoré Claude Guédon de Presles who often performed at court.

Mlle Guédon de Presles performed for the first time in court before the queen in 1748, when she sang in Mouret's ballet Les Sens. During the 1740s and 1750s, she sang at the Paris Thèâtre de la Reine in secondary roles.

Between 1742 and 1747, a number of her songs were published in Mercure de France. She is the first known woman to have published a collection of airs.
