= Kënga Magjike 2003 =

Dates
- Final: 23 November

Host
- Venue: Palace of Congresses, Tirana, Albania
- Presenter(s): Ardit Gjebrea & Brigitte Nielsen

Participants
- Number of entries: 31 songs

Vote
- Voting system: Jury & Televote
- Winning song: Ema Bytyçi

Kënga Magjike 05 took place in the Palace of Congresses in Tirana, Albania. There were two semifinals (21 & 22 November 2003) and a final (23 November 2003). 31 songs competed for the win but only 17 made it to the final. In the end, Ema Bytyçi won the first prize. Aleksandër Gjoka was the runner-up. The number of points for each singer was announced by each jury member.

== Results ==
| Rank | Artist | Song | Points |
|---|---|---|---|
| 1 | Ema Bytyçi | Ku Je Ti | 104 |
| 2 | Aleksandër Gjoka | Kuturu | 101 |
| 3 | Albërie Hadërgjonaj | Ti Nuk Je | 99 |

== Voting procedure ==
The jury voted based on a point system for most of the prizes, while the televote determined the "Public's Prize".

=== Jury ===
- President Of The Jury: Afërdita Saraçini Klemendi

The jury this year was made up of all female members.

== Other prizes ==
| # | Prize | Translation | Artist | Song |
|---|---|---|---|---|
| 1 | Çmimi Alternativ | Alternative Prize | Etno Engjëjt | nate |
| 2 | Magjia E Parë | First Magic | Floriana Muça | per ty |
| 3 | Paraqitja Skenike | Stage Presence | Jonida Maliqi | vetem nje nate |
| 4 | Kantautori Më I Mirë | Best Songwriter | Pirro Çako | une ai ajo |
| 5 | Koleksioni Magjik | Magic Collection | The Dreams | dua te te bind |
| 6 | Çeks Zadeja | Çesk Zadeja | Kujtim Prodani | I'm From Tirana |
| 7 | Millennium | Millennium | Eri | vertet a iluzion |
| 8 | RTV 21 | RTV 21 | Evis Mula | Të Dua Ty |
| 9 | TV Klan | TV Klan | Julka | te ndjej |
| 10 | Best Videoclip | Best Videoclip | Alketa Vejsiu & Flori Mumajesi | Merrmë Të Fundit Natë |
| 11 | Jon Muzic | Jon Muzic | Fitnete Tuda | Si Muzika |
| 12 | Linda Association | Linda Association | Ledina Çelo | Të Dua Se Je Ti |
| 13 | Çmimi Diskografik | Discography Prize | Produkt 28 | trokas |
| 14 | Çmimi I Kritikës | Critic's Prize | Aleksandër Gjoka | Kuturu |
| 15 | Çmimi I Tingullit | Best Melody | Ema Bytyçi | Ku Je Ti |
| 16 | Çmimi I Interpretimit | Best Interpretation | Albërie Hadërgjonaj | Ti Nuk Je |
| 17 | Çmimi I Publikut | Public's Prize | West Side Family | hou cike |

== Orchestra ==
Playback was used.

== Guest artists ==
- Nathalie Arts
- Kim Lucas

== Staff ==
- Organizer: Ardit Gjebrea
- Director: Vera Grabocka

== Sources ==
- http://www.kengamagjike.com
- http://muzika.albasoul.com/terejat.php?id=1267
