= Ergi Dini =

Albanian singer

- Birth name: Erdi Dashamir Dini
- Also known as: Ergi
- Born: 15 October 1994; Shkodër, Albania
- Origin: Shkodër
- Died: 21 November 2016 (aged 22); Tirana, Albania
- Genres: Pop
- Occupation: Singer
- Instruments: Vocals
- Years active: 2013–2016

Ergi Dini (15 October 1994 – 21 November 2016) was an Albanian singer, best known for winning the third season of X Factor Albania. Dini was born in Shkodër, Albania on 15 October 1994, and began singing as a soloist at children's festivals. He was the brother of the famous singer Barbana Dini. Ergi Dini attended the Jordan Misja Artistic Lyceum in Tirana.

The year 2013 marked a turning point in Dini's career. He decided to appear in the auditions of X Factor Albania where Ergi stood out for his voice timber, vocal potency and interpretation of songs. His work was highly praised by the X Factor jury and was always considered the most likely winner of this competition.

On February 23, 2014, Ergi Dini was announced the winner of the third season of X Factor. Sarah, the 3rd competitor from Italy, was ranked 3rd among the best, only to remain in the strong competition between two boys like Ergi Dini & Senad Rrahmani. With a majority of votes from the public, Dini managed to become the winner, thus making his mentor Tuna the winner for the second time.

On April 9, 2015, Ergi Dini released the music video for "Morphine". This was the first single and the first video clip of the artist from Shkodra. The song was sung in Gheg Albanian and was very carefully curated.

In September 2015, Ergi Dini participated in the Kënga Magjike 2015 with the song "Pa Fryme", with music and lyrics by Dini himself and orchestrated by Darko Dimitrov.

On April 15, 2016, Ergi Dini published the video clip "Asnji Gram". The music and lyrics were written by Dini himself, while Alandy took care of the orchestration. The video clip was produced by Max Production.

Ergi Dini died on November 21, 2016, in a motorcycle accident in Tirana.

On October 15, 2019, a posthumous music video "Ku Je?" was released In collaboration with Barbana Dini. The music of the song was composed by Ergi Dini, the lyrics were written by Ergi Dini & Pandi Laço, while the orchestration was provided by Irkenc Hyka. The video clip was produced by MAX Production. After 3 years, Barbana Dini has fulfilled the will of her brother, making it possible for him to present the song in collaboration with her late brother on the day of his twenty-fifth birthday. The song was promoted in the studio of the show "Rudina", where Barbana was accompanied by her hero, as she considers her father, Mr. Dashamir Dini.

== Discography ==
=== Singles ===
- Ain't no sunshine (feat. Tuna)
- Angie
- Asnji gram
- Can't take my eyes off you
- Dimni
- Funikuli Funikula
- Granada
- I got the dream
- Ku je (feat. Barbana Dini)
- Man's world
- Morphine
- Pa fryme
- Refuzoj
- Show must go on
- Sweet dreams
- Unchain my heart
