= X Factor (Albanian TV series) season 3 =

X Factor
- Season 3
- Hosted by: Alketa Vejsiu
- Judges: Alban Skënderaj; Soni Malaj; Altuna Sejdiu; Pandi Laço
- Winner: Ergi Dini
- Runner-up: Senad Rrahmani

Release
- Original network: Klan Television
- Original release: 15 September 2013 – 23 February 2014

Season chronology
- ← Previous; Season 2 Next → Season 4

X Factor is an Albanian television music competition to find new singing talents. The third season began on 15 September on TV Klan.

Based on the British format, the competition consists of auditions, in front of producers and then the judges with a live audience; bootcamp; judges' houses and then the live finals. The producers' auditions for the show began in April 2013 in Albania, Kosovo and Macedonia. The winners were later called back to perform in front of the judges, held from May 19–21 in Tirana. However, the auditions were broadcast in September, when the show started airing. The show will be hosted once again by Albanian singer Alketa Vejsiu, while the judging panel consists of pop singer Altuna Sejdiu, Alban Skenderaj, Soni Malaj and Pandi Laço.

This year, the producers have decided to give more attention to the live shows, extending it to 15 weeks, and not airing bootcamp. The auditions were aired in three shows only, and then the show passed to the judges houses, airing only the finalists' bootcamp performance and result. Thus, to make the live shows longer to give the contestants more time to perform.

The other difference this year, is that there is a variety of contestants who come from different places. Sarah Memmola is from Italy, who challenged herself to take part in the X Factor Albania. There are six contestants from Macedonia this year. There is no soloist from Kosovo this year, and there is a singer from Serbia, Donika Nuhiu, for the first time in the show.

== Judges' houses ==
The 15 eliminated acts were:

- Boys: Endri Caci, Genti Sheholli, Ilirian Mertani, Yllnor Kurti
- Girls: Alma Kadria, Anxhela Dano, Arlinda Kovaci, Oreta Leka
- Over 23s: Adelina Bacaj, Ester Abazi, Joana Gjini
- Groups: Divas, New Life, The Fevers, Victorious 4

== Contestants ==
The top 16 contestants were confirmed as follows;

Key:

– Winner
– Runner-up

Category (mentor)	Acts			
Boys (Sejdiu)	Ademir Fresku	Amadeo Gjura	Ergi Dini	Leotrim Zejnullahu
Girls (Laço)	Arissa Rexho	Enxhi Nasufi	Kristina Leka	Laura Kërliu
Over 23s (Skënderaj)	Fatmir Durmishi	Mia Morina	Sarah Memmola	Senad Rrahmani
Groups (Malaj)	Dream Girls	Exception	Free Spirit	Nimfat

== Live shows ==
=== Results summary ===
Colour key

–	Contestant received the fewest public votes and had to sing again in the sing-off

Weekly results per contestant
Contestant	Week 1	Week 2	Week 3	Week 4	Week 5	Week 6	Week 7	Week 8	Week 9	Week 10	Week 11	Week 12	Week 13	Week 14	Week 15	
Contestant	Week 1	Week 2	Week 3	Week 4	Week 5	Week 6	Week 7	Week 8	Week 9	Week 10	Week 11	Week 12	Week 13	Week 14	Round One	Round Two
Ergi Dini	Safe	Safe	Safe	Safe	Safe	Safe	Safe	Safe	Safe	Safe	Safe	Safe	Safe	Safe	Safe	Winner (week 15)
Senad Rrahmani	Safe	Safe	Safe	Safe	Safe	Safe	Safe	Safe	Safe	Safe	Safe	Safe	Safe	Safe	Safe	Runner-up (week 15)
Sarah Memmola	Safe	Safe	Safe	Safe	Safe	Safe	Safe	Safe	Safe	Safe	Safe	Bottom two	Safe	Bottom two	3rd	Eliminated (week 15)
Enxhi Nasufi	Safe	Safe	Safe	Safe	Safe	Safe	Safe	Safe	Safe	Safe	Safe	Safe	4th	Bottom two	Eliminated (week 14)	
Exception	Safe	Safe	Safe	Safe	Safe	Safe	10th	Safe	Safe	Safe	Bottom two	Safe	5th	Eliminated (week 13)		
Leotrim Zejnullahu	Safe	Safe	Safe	Safe	Safe	Safe	Safe	Safe	Safe	7th	Safe	Bottom two	Eliminated (week 12)			
Laura Kërliu	Safe	Safe	Bottom two	Safe	Safe	Safe	Safe	Safe	Bottom two	Safe	Bottom two	Eliminated (week 11)				
Amadeo Gjura	Safe	Safe	Safe	Safe	Bottom two	Safe	Safe	9th	Safe	8th	Eliminated (week 10)					
Mia Morina	Safe	Safe	Safe	Safe	Safe	Bottom two	Safe	Safe	Bottom two	Eliminated (week 9)						
Free Spirit	Safe	Safe	Safe	Safe	Safe	Safe	Safe	10th	Eliminated (week 8)							
Arissa Rexho	Safe	Safe	Safe	13th	Safe	Safe	11th	Eliminated (week 7)								
Fatmir Durmishi	Safe	Safe	Safe	Safe	Safe	Bottom two	Eliminated (week 6)									
Nimfat	Safe	Safe	Safe	Safe	Bottom two	Eliminated (week 5)										
Kristina Leka	Safe	Safe	Safe	14th	Eliminated (week 4)											
Dream Girls	Safe	Bottom two	Bottom two	Eliminated (week 3)												
Ademir Fresku	Safe	Bottom two	Eliminated (week 2)													
Final showdown		Ademir Fresku; Dream Girls	Dream Girls; Laura Kërliu	Arissa Rexho; Kristina Leka	Amadeo Gjura; Nimfat	Fatmir Durmishi; Mia Morina	Arissa Rexho; Exception	Amadeo Gjura; Free Spirit	Laura Kërliu; Mia Morina	Amadeo Gjura; Leotrim Zejnullahu	Exception; Laura Kërliu	Leotrim Zejnullahu; Sarah Memmola	Enxhi Nasufi; Exception	Enxhi Nasufi; Sarah Memmola	No final showdown or judges' vote: results are based on public votes alone	
Skënderaj's vote to eliminate:	—	Ademir Fresku	Dream Girls	Kristina Leka	Nimfat	Fatmir Durmishi	Exception	Amadeo Gjura	Laura Kërliu	Amadeo Gjura	Laura Kërliu	Leotrim Zejnullahu	Exception	Enxhi Nasufi	No final showdown or judges' vote: results are based on public votes alone	
Sejdiu's vote to eliminate:	—	Dream Girls	Dream Girls	Kristina Leka	Nimfat	Fatmir Durmishi	Arissa Rexho	Free Spirit	Mia Morina	Leotrim Zejnullahu	Laura Kërliu	Sarah Memmola	Enxhi Nasufi	Enxhi Nasufi	No final showdown or judges' vote: results are based on public votes alone	
Malaj's vote to eliminate:	—	Ademir Fresku	Laura Kërliu	Arissa Rexho	Amadeo Gjura	Fatmir Durmishi	Arissa Rexho	Amadeo Gjura	Mia Morina	Amadeo Gjura	Laura Kërliu	Leotrim Zejnullahu	Enxhi Nasufi	Enxhi Nasufi	No final showdown or judges' vote: results are based on public votes alone	
Laço's vote to eliminate:	—	Ademir Fresku	Dream Girls	Arissa Rexho	Nimfat	—	Exception	Free Spirit	Mia Morina	Leotrim Zejnullahu	Exception	Leotrim Zejnullahu	Exception	Sarah Memmola	No final showdown or judges' vote: results are based on public votes alone	
Eliminated	None	Ademir Fresku; 3 of 4 votes Majority	Dream Girls; 3 of 4 votes Majority	Kristina Leka; 2 of 4 votes Deadlock	Nimfat; 3 of 4 votes Majority	Fatmir Durmishi; 3 of 3 votes Majority	Arissa Rexho; 2 of 4 votes Deadlock	Free Spirit; 2 of 4 votes Deadlock	Mia Morina; 3 of 4 votes Majority	Amadeo Gjura; 2 of 4 votes Deadlock	Laura Kërliu; 3 of 4 votes Majority	Leotrim Zejnullahu; 3 of 4 votes Majority	Exception; 2 of 4 votes Deadlock	Enxhi Nasufi; 3 of 4 votes Majority	Sarah Memmola; Third Place	Senad Rrahmani; Runner-Up
Eliminated	None	Ademir Fresku; 3 of 4 votes Majority	Dream Girls; 3 of 4 votes Majority	Kristina Leka; 2 of 4 votes Deadlock	Nimfat; 3 of 4 votes Majority	Fatmir Durmishi; 3 of 3 votes Majority	Arissa Rexho; 2 of 4 votes Deadlock	Free Spirit; 2 of 4 votes Deadlock	Mia Morina; 3 of 4 votes Majority	Amadeo Gjura; 2 of 4 votes Deadlock	Laura Kërliu; 3 of 4 votes Majority	Leotrim Zejnullahu; 3 of 4 votes Majority	Exception; 2 of 4 votes Deadlock	Enxhi Nasufi; 3 of 4 votes Majority	Sarah Memmola; Third Place	Ergi Dini; Winner

=== Live show details ===
==== Week 1 (27 October 2013) ====
- Group performance: "On the Floor"

Contestants' performances on the first live show
Act	Order	Song	Result
Nimfat	1	"Wings"	Safe
Ergi Dini	2	"Unchain My Heart"	Safe
Mia Morina	3	"You and I"	Safe
Enxhi Nasufi	4	"Bound to You"	Safe
Ademir Fresku	5	"Angels"	Safe
Dream Girls	6	"Proud Mary"	Safe
Arissa Rexho	7	"One Night Only"	Safe
Free Spirit	8	"I Love Rock 'n' Roll"	Safe
Fatmir Durmishi	9	"Mama"	Safe
Amadeo Gjura	10	"I Just Want to Make Love to You"	Safe
Kristina Leka	11	"Read All About It"	Safe
Leotrim Zejnullahu	12	"I Can't Stop Loving You"	Safe
Exception	13	"I Want It That Way"	Safe
Sarah Memmola	14	"Almeno tu nell'universo"	Safe
Laura Kërliu	15	"Like a Virgin"	Safe
Senad Rrahmani	16	"Runaway"	Safe
No Final Showdown

==== Week 2 (3 November 2013) ====
- Group performance: "Counting Stars"

Contestants' performances on the second live show
Act	Order	Song	Result
Exception	1	"This Love"	Safe
Senad Rrahmani	2	"Wild World"	Safe
Mia Morina	3	"You Know I'm No Good"	Safe
Arissa Rexho	4	"Call Me When You're Sober"	Safe
Sarah Memmola	5	"Valeria"	Safe
Ademir Fresku	6	"To the Moon and Back"	Bottom two
Nimfat	7	"Telephone"	Safe
Laura Kërliu	8	"I Kissed a Girl"	Safe
Amadeo Gjura	9	"Tainted Love"	Safe
Dream Girls	10	"Lady Marmalade"	Bottom two
Leotrim Zejnullahu	11	"Sorry Seems to Be the Hardest Word"	Safe
Fatmir Durmishi	12	"Il cuore è uno zingaro"	Safe
Kristina Leka	13	"Somebody That I Used to Know"	Safe
Free Spirit	14	"We Will Rock You"/"I Want It All"	Safe
Ergi Dini	15	"The Show Must Go On"	Safe
Enxhi Nasufi	16	"Wild"	Safe
Final showdown details
Ademir Fresku	1	"Save the Last Dance for Me"	Eliminated
Dream Girls	2	"My Kind of Love"	Safe

Judges' votes to eliminate

- Pandi Laço: Ademir Fresku
- Altuna Sejdiu: Dream Girls
- Soni Malaj: Ademir Fresku
- Alban Skënderaj: Ademir Fresku

==== Week 3 (10 November 2013) ====
Group performance: "You Are Not Alone"

Contestants' performances on the third live show
Act	Order	Song	Result
Laura Kërliu	1	"Broken-Hearted Girl"	Bottom two
Senad Rrahmani	2	"Is This the End"	Safe
Nimfat	3	"Grenade"	Safe
Leotrim Zejnullahu	4	"(I've Had) The Time of My Life"	Safe
Arissa Rexho	5	"Give Your Heart a Break"	Safe
Kristina Leka	6	"Don't You Remember"	Safe
Fatmir Durmishi	7	"Svalutation"	Safe
Dream Girls	8	"Skyfall"	Bottom two
Sarah Memmola	9	"Gli uomini non cambiano"	Safe
Exception	10	"Love Is the Way"	Safe
Amadeo Gjura	11	"Creep"	Safe
Ergi Dini	12	"Sweet Dreams (Are Made of This)"	Safe
Enxhi Nasufi	13	"If I Were a Boy"	Safe
Free Spirit	14	"In the End"	Safe
Mia Morina	15	"Right to Be Wrong"	Safe
Final showdown details
Laura Kërliu	1	"The Winner Takes It All"	Safe
Dream Girls	2	"Fallin'"	Eliminated

Judges' votes to eliminate

- Pandi Laço: Dream Girls
- Soni Malaj: Laura Kërliu
- Alban Skënderaj: Dream Girls
- Altuna Sejdiu: Dream Girls

==== Week 4 (17 November 2013) ====
Contestants' performances on the fourth live show
Act	Order	Song	Result
Leotrim Zejnullahu	1	"Breakeven"	Safe
Enxhi Nasufi	2	"Bad Boys"	Safe
Free Spirit	3	"Hit the Road Jack"/"Djaloshi dhe shiu"	Safe
Mia Morina	4	"Nothing Compares 2 U"	Safe
Kristina Leka	5	"Beautiful"	Bottom two
Arissa Rexho	6	"Still Loving You"	Bottom two
Senad Rrahmani	7	"Bailamos"	Safe
Nimfat	8	"Price Tag"	Safe
Fatmir Durmishi	9	"Anche Senza Di Te"	Safe
Sarah Memmola	10	"Meravigliosa creatura"	Safe
Amadeo Gjura	11	"Raggamuffin"	Safe
Ergi Dini	12	"It's a Man's Man's Man's World"	Safe
Laura Kërliu	13	"Mercy"	Safe
Exception	14	"La La La"	Safe
Final showdown details
Kristina Leka	1	"Someone like You"	Eliminated
Arissa Rexho	2	"My Heart Is Refusing Me"	Safe

Judges' votes to eliminate

- Pandi Laço: Arissa Rexho
- Altuna Sejdiu: Kristina Leka
- Soni Malaj: Arissa Rexho
- Alban Skënderaj: Kristina Leka

With the acts in the bottom two receiving two votes each, the result was deadlocked and reverted to the earlier public vote. Leka was eliminated as the act with the fewest public votes.

==== Week 5 (24 November 2013) ====
Contestants' performances on the fifth live show
Act	Order	Song	Result
Arissa Rexho	1	"Born This Way"	Safe
Free Spirit	2	"Gangsta's Paradise"	Safe
Sarah Memmola	3	"All by Myself"	Safe
Ergi Dini	4	"Angie"	Safe
Fatmir Durmishi	5	"My Love"	Safe
Mia Morina	6	"My Number One"	Safe
Amadeo Gjura	7	"Seven Nation Army"	Bottom two
Exception	8	"What Makes You Beautiful"	Safe
Enxhi Nasufi	9	"This Is My Now"	Safe
Nimfat	10	"It Will Rain"	Bottom two
Leotrim Zejnullahu	11	"Feeling Good"	Safe
Laura Kërliu	12	"Flashdance... What a Feeling"	Safe
Senad Rrahmani	13	"Please Forgive Me"	Safe
Final showdown details
Amadeo Gjura	1	"Different Pulses"	Safe
Nimfat	2	"Too Lost in You"	Eliminated

Judges' votes to eliminate

- Altuna Sejdiu: Nimfat
- Soni Malaj: Amadeo Gjura
- Alban Skënderaj: Nimfat
- Pandi Laço: Nimfat

==== Week 6 (8 December 2013) ====
Contestants' performances on the sixth live show
Act	Order	Song	Result
Senad Rrahmani	1	"Rebel Yell"	Safe
Enxhi Nasufi	2	"I'm Your Baby Tonight"	Safe
Free Spirit	3	"They Don't Care About Us"	Safe
Laura Kërliu	4	"You Lost Me"	Safe
Amadeo Gjura	5	"One"	Safe
Arissa Rexho	6	"Wrecking Ball"	Safe
Fatmir Durmishi	7	"L'emozione non ha voce"	Bottom two
Mia Morina	8	"True Colors"	Bottom two
Leotrim Zejnullahu	9	"I Would Do Anything for Love (But I Won't Do That)"	Safe
Exception	10	"Impossible"	Safe
Ergi Dini	11	"I've Got Dreams to Remember"	Safe
Sarah Memmola	12	"Jetoj"	Safe
Final showdown details
Fatmir Durmishi	1	""	Eliminated
Mia Morina	2	"I Can't Make You Love Me"	Safe

Judges' votes to eliminate

- Alban Skënderaj: Fatmir Durmishi
- Altuna Sejdiu: Fatmir Durmishi
- Soni Malaj: Fatmir Durmishi
- Pandi Laço: It was not necessary to vote for Fatmir Durmishi already had the votes necessary for elimination.

==== Week 7 (15 December 2013) ====
Contestants' performances on the seventh live show
Act	Order	Song	Result
Ergi Dini	1	"Refuzoj"	Safe
Amadeo Gjura	2	"Sexy and I Know It"	Safe
Arissa Rexho	3	"Girl on Fire"	Bottom two
Free Spirit	4	"It's My Life"	Safe
Senad Rrahmani	5	"Here Without You"	Safe
Mia Morina	6	"Baby Boy"	Safe
Exception	7	"Cry Me a River"	Bottom two
Sarah Memmola	8	"Il cielo e sempre piu blu"	Safe
Leotrim Zejnullahu	9	"Ne me quitte pas"	Safe
Laura Kërliu	10	"Forget You"	Safe
Enxhi Nasufi	11	"Domino"	Safe
Final showdown details
Arissa Rexho	1	"Just Like a Pill"	Eliminated
Exception	2	"Impossible"	Safe

Judges' votes to eliminate

- Soni Malaj: Arissa Rexho
- Pandi Laço: Exception
- Alban Skënderaj: Exception
- Altuna Sejdiu: Arissa Rexho

With the acts in the bottom two receiving two votes each, the result was deadlocked and reverted to the earlier public vote. Rexho was eliminated as the act with the fewest public votes.

==== Week 8 (22 December 2013) ====
Contestants' performances on the eighth live show
Act	Order	Song	Result
Sarah Memmola	1	"Hape zemren ti"	Safe
Leotrim Zejnullahu	2	"You Raise Me Up"	Safe
Free Spirit	3	"Eja me diellin"/"Dimeroj"	Bottom two
Mia Morina	4	"Frozen"	Safe
Amadeo Gjura	5	"Love Me Again"	Bottom two
Exception	6	"Shake Up Christmas"	Safe
Enxhi Nasufi	7	"Skyscraper"	Safe
Ergi Dini	8	"Down with the Sickness"	Safe
Laura Kërliu	9	"Nuk jane me"	Safe
Senad Rrahmani	10	"Sex on Fire"	Safe
Final showdown details
Amadeo Gjura	1	"Dog Days Are Over"	Safe
Free Spirit	2	"Highway to Hell"	Eliminated

Judges' votes to eliminate

- Altuna Sejdiu: Free Spirit
- Soni Malaj: Amadeo Gjura
- Alban Skënderaj: Amadeo Gjura
- Pandi Laço: Free Spirit

==== Week 9 (5 January 2014) ====
Contestants' performances on the ninth live show
Act	Order	Song	Result
Exception	1	"More than This"	Safe
Mia Morina	2	"Speechless"	Bottom two
Ergi Dini	3	"A Change Is Gonna Come"	Safe
Leotrim Zejnullahu	4	"Can You Feel the Love Tonight"	Safe
Laura Kërliu	5	"Empire State of Mind (Part II) Broken Down"	Bottom two
Amadeo Gjura	6	"Piece of My Heart"	Safe
Sarah Memmola	7	"If I Ain't Got You"	Safe
Senad Rrahmani	8	"You Give Love a Bad Name"	Safe
Enxhi Nasufi	9	"Me ty"	Safe
Final showdown details
Mia Morina	1	"Make You Feel My Love"	Eliminated
Laura Kërliu	2	"The Reason"	Safe

Judges' votes to eliminate

- Pandi Laço: Mia Morina
- Alban Skënderaj: Laura Kërliu
- Altuna Sejdiu: Mia Morina
- Soni Malaj: Mia Morina

==== Week 10 (12 January 2014) ====
Contestants' performances on the tenth live show
Act	Order	Song	Result
Leotrim Zejnullahu	1	"Georgia on My Mind"	Bottom two
Laura Kërliu	2	"Why Don't You Love Me"	Safe
Ergi Dini	3	"Bodies"	Safe
Exception	4	"Moves like Jagger"	Safe
Amadeo Gjura	5	"E kemi fatin shprese dhe marrezi"	Bottom two
Senad Rrahmani	6	"Have You Ever Really Loved a Woman?"	Safe
Enxhi Nasufi	7	"End of Time"	Safe
Sarah Memmola	8	"Ancora"	Safe
Final showdown details
Leotrim Zejnullahu	1	"Purple Rain"	Safe
Amadeo Gjura	2	"Never Tear Us Apart"	Eliminated

Judges' votes to eliminate

- Altuna Sejdiu: Leotrim Zejnullahu
- Alban Skënderaj: Amadeo Gjura
- Soni Malaj: Amadeo Gjura
- Pandi Laço: Leotrim Zejnullahu

==== Week 11 (19 January 2014) ====
Contestants' performances on the eleventh live show
Act	Order	Song	Result
Sarah Memmola	1	"Caruso"	Safe
Ergi Dini	2	"Lady"	Safe
Exception	3	"Everybody (Backstreet's Back)"	Bottom two
Laura Kërliu	4	"I Don't Want to Miss a Thing"	Bottom two
Leotrim Zejnullahu	5	"Use Somebody"	Safe
Enxhi Nasufi	6	"The Best"	Safe
Senad Rrahmani	7	"Diamonds"	Safe
Final showdown details
Laura Kërliu	1	"Cry for You"	Eliminated
Exception	2	"Breathe Easy"	Safe

Judges' votes to eliminate

- Pandi Laço: Exception
- Soni Malaj: Laura Kërliu
- Alban Skënderaj: Laura Kërliu
- Altuna Sejdiu: Laura Kërliu

==== Week 12 (26 January 2014) ====
Contestants' performances on the twelfth live show
Act	Order	Song	Result
Exception	1	"Don't Let Go (Love)"	Safe
Sarah Memmola	2	"Adagio in G minor"	Bottom two
Leotrim Zejnullahu	3	"My Way"	Bottom two
Senad Rrahmani	4	"Maska"	Safe
Ergi Dini	5	"Careless Whisper"	Safe
Enxhi Nasufi	6	"Listen"	Safe
Final showdown details
Sarah Memmola	1	""	Safe
Leotrim Zejnullahu	2	"Don't Let the Sun Go Down on Me"	Eliminated

Judges' votes to eliminate

- Alban Skënderaj: Leotrim Zejnullahu
- Altuna Sejdiu: Sarah Memmola
- Soni Malaj: Leotrim Zejnullahu
- Pandi Laço: Leotrim Zejnullahu

==== Week 13 (2 February 2014) ====
Contestants' performances on the thirteenth live show
Act	Order	First song	Order	Second song	Result
Sarah Memmola	1	"Sono sole parole"	6	"S'je më"	Safe
Senad Rrahmani	2	"Hallelujah"	7	"Iris"	Safe
Enxhi Nasufi	3	"Fighter"	8	"Engjëjt vrasin njëlloj"	Bottom two
Exception	4	"E urrej shiun"	9	"Larger than Life"	Bottom two
Ergi Dini	5	"Can't Take My Eyes Off You"	10	"Baladë për Jakup Ferrin"	Safe
Final showdown details
Enxhi Nasufi	1	"I Care"			Safe
Exception	2	"Zemrën e lamë peng"			Eliminated

Judges' votes to eliminate

- Pandi Laço: Exception
- Soni Malaj: Enxhi Nasufi
- Alban Skenderaj: Exception
- Altuna Sejdiu: Enxhi Nasufi

==== Week 14 (9 February 2014) ====
Contestants' performances on the fourteenth live show
Act	Order	First song	Order	Second song	Result
Enxhi Nasufi	1	"I Was Here"	5	"Oh Mother"	Safe
Senad Rrahmani	2	"When I Was Your Man"	6	"Enter Sandman"	Safe
Ergi Dini	3	"Na lini te jetojme"	7	"A Place For My Head"	Safe
Sarah Memmola	4	"Guarda che luna"	8	"Rrjedh ne kenge e ligjerime"	Safe
No Final Showdown

==== Week 15: Semi-Final (16 February 2014) ====
Contestants' performances on the fifteenth live show
Act	Order	First song	Order	Second song	Result
Enxhi Nasufi	1	"Crazy in Love"	5	"Fluturimi" (with Flori Mumajesi)	Bottom two
Senad Rrahmani	2	"Fear of the Dark"	6	"Al Kapone" (with Elita 5)	Safe
Sarah Memmola	3	"Vetëm ty"	7	"Perdere l'amore" (with Mario-s)	Bottom two
Ergi Dini	4	"Belle"	8	"I Don't Want to Miss a Thing" (with Juliana Pasha)	Safe
Final showdown details
Enxhi Nasufi	1	"This Is My Now"			Eliminated
Sarah Memmola	2	""			Safe

Judges' votes to eliminate

- Pandi Laço: Sarah Memmola
- Soni Malaj: Enxhi Nasufi
- Alban Skenderaj: Enxhi Nasufi
- Altuna Sejdiu: Enxhi Nasufi
