= PLA (disambiguation) =

PLA commonly refers to the People's Liberation Army, the principal military force of the Chinese Communist Party.

PLA may also refer to:

== Organizations ==
=== Politics and military ===
- Party of Labour of Albania, ruling party of Albania from 1945 to 1991
- People's Liberation Army (disambiguation)
  - Irish National Liberation Army, formerly called the People's Liberation Army
  - People's Liberation Army (Lebanon)
  - People's Liberation Army of Manipur, India
- Palestine Liberation Army, the military wing of the Palestine Liberation Organization
- ProLife Alliance, a former UK political party

=== Other organizations ===
- Pacific Locomotive Association, operator of the Niles Canyon Railway in California, US
- Pakistan Library Association
- Pediatric Leadership Alliance, of the American Academy of Pediatrics
- Phone Losers of America, a US phone phreaking group
- Port of London Authority, England
- Pre-school Learning Alliance, England
- Public Library Association, a US professional association

== Science and technology ==
- Polylactic acid, a biodegradable polymer used as 3D printing filament
- Principle of least astonishment, a principle in software design
- Programmable logic array, a semiconductor device
- Proximity ligation assay, to detect proteins
- Protected landscape areas, areas with natural, ecological or cultural values
- Phospholipase A
  - Phospholipase A1 (PLA1)
  - Phospholipase A2 (PLA2)

== Other uses ==
- Postal code for Paola, Malta
- Pokémon Legends: Arceus, a 2022 action role-playing game developed for the Nintendo Switch
- Prior learning assessment, in education
- Project Labor Agreement, a collective bargaining agreement
- Pulau Aie railway station in Padang, West Sumatra, Indonesia (station code)
- Rafael Cordero Santiago Port of the Americas, a megaport in Puerto Rico

== See also ==
- Pla (disambiguation)
