= Château d'Usson =

Coordinates: 42°44′08″N 2°5′15″E

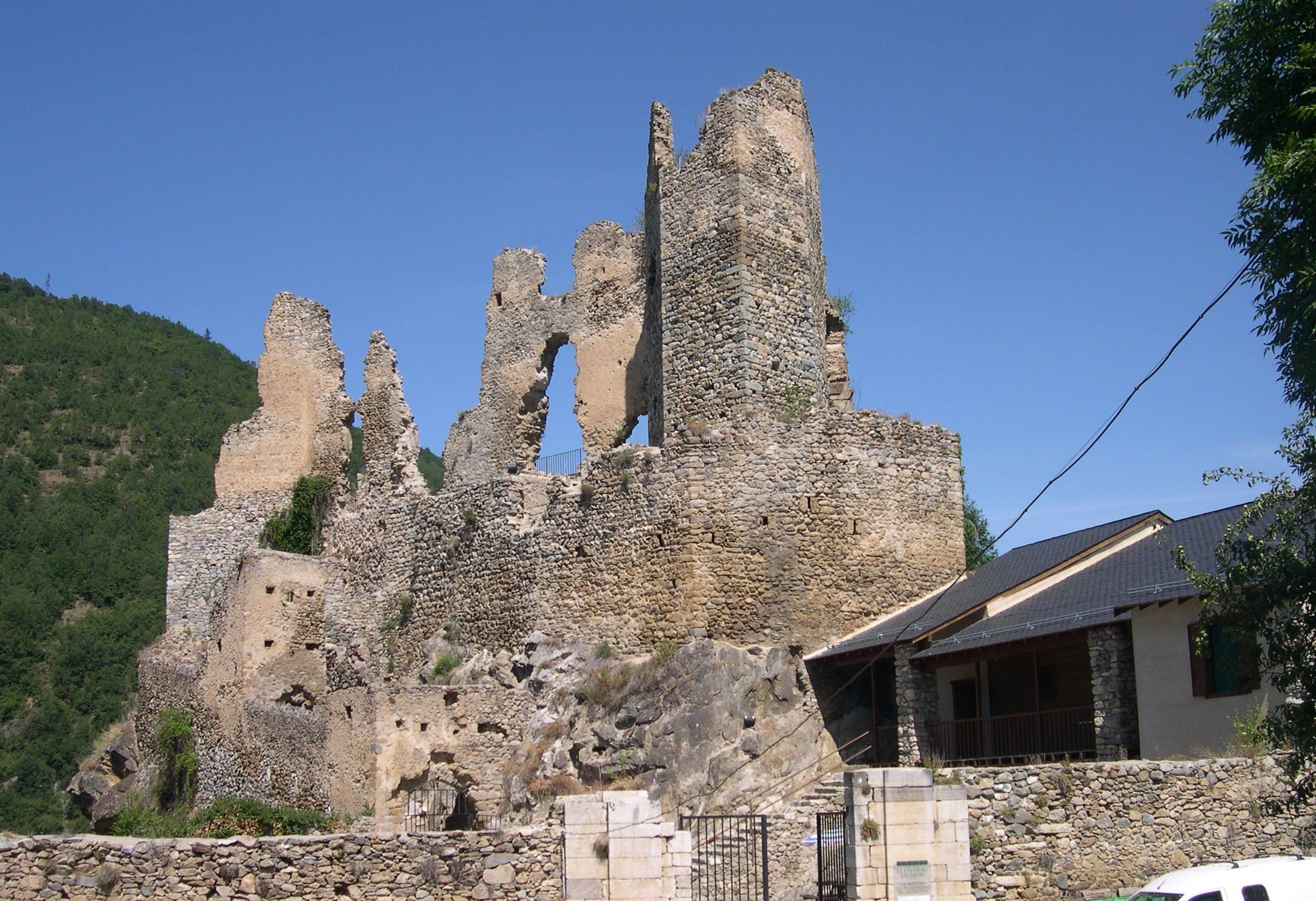
Château d'Usson

The Château d'Usson (en Occitan: Castèl de So) is one of the so-called Cathar castles in what is now southwestern France. It is located in the commune of Rouze, in the Ariège département. It is sited upstream from Axat, along the Aude river gorge, carved out of the foothills of the Pyrenees. It is situated at an altitude of 920 metres (3,020 ft) and dominates the valley of the Aude. The Château de Puilaurens is 30 kilometres (19 mi) away, Château de Puivert 49 kilometres (30 mi) and Château de Quéribus 60 kilometres (37 mi).

== History ==
The castle dates from the 11th century (perhaps earlier) and during the Cathar period marked the eastern boundary of the territories of the Counts of Foix. In the 12th century, this was the capital of the Donézan region. Before the défilé was cut through the mountains to link Quillan to Axat, this was an inaccessible outpost providing succour for faidits and other persecuted Cathars. The Cathar bishop of Toulouse Guilhabert de Castres is known to have taken refuge here.

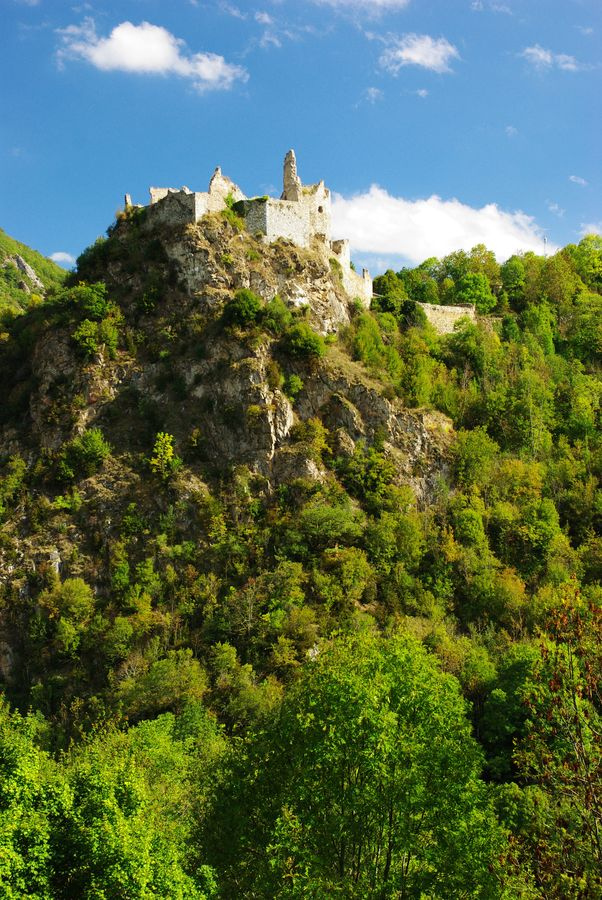
Valley view

Towards the end of the wars against the Cathars this was one of their last sanctuaries, providing support for Montségur. The seigneurs of Usson, Bernard d'Alion, lord of the Château de Montaillou, and his brother Arnaud d'Usson sent arms and supplies to their besieged comrades there. On 15 March 1244, the day before 225 Cathar parfaits were burned alive at Montségur, four other parfaits left the castle there for Usson, where the Cathar treasure had been evacuated a few months earlier. This mystery has fed a number of theories about the equally mysterious treasure supposedly found at Rennes-le-Château in the 19th century.

Bernard d'Alion was burned alive at Perpignan in 1258. The castle was rebuilt as a French border fortress, and given by Louis XIV to the new Marquis d'Usson. Like other seigneurial residences it was sold as communal property at the French Revolution, after which time it was used as a stone quarry.

Not far away is the Château de Donézan, where Cathars were still holding out eleven years after the fall of Montségur.

Château d'Usson is listed as a monument historique by the French Ministry of Culture.

On display at the castle are parts of the wreckage of a Second World War British Dakota transport aircraft which crashed on 5 December 1944 on a nearby mountain with the loss of seventeen lives.

== See also ==
- List of castles in France
- Cathar castles
- Cathar castles in French Wikipedia (in French)
