= Joan Baptista Pla =

Spanish composer and oboist

Joan Baptista Pla i Agustí (c. 1720–1773) was a Catalan composer and oboist.

Pla was born in Catalonia, into a Catalan family of musicians. In the years after 1751, he worked in many of the principal cities of Europe including Padua, Stuttgart, Brussels, Paris and London along with his brother, Josep Pla i Agustí (1728–1762), a chamber musician. After Josep's death, Joan Baptista went to Lisbon as an oboist and bassoonist. He died in Lisbon.

The Pla brothers left hundreds of manuscripts including about 30 trio sonatas and some concertos for flute and strings. Another brother, Manuel Pla (c. 1725–1766) was a violinist and harpsichordist at the court of Madrid.

== Sources ==
- Joan Baptista Pla, entry in the German Wikipedia
