= Pediatric Leadership Alliance =

The Pediatric Leadership Alliance (PLA) is a proprietary physician leadership program of the American Academy of Pediatrics (AAP). The program includes interactive elements such as case studies and team-based exercises, and incorporates evidence-based leadership principles as its core curriculum. The PLA is based on Kouse’s and Posner’s Five Practices of Exemplary Leadership, and includes individual leadership assessments and learning agreements to measure participants’ development. It is offered in the format of a series of didactic lectures followed by other modalities shown to enhance participant interactions. The PLA focuses on developing the core competencies for public health leadership as identified by the U.S National Public Health Leadership Network. These competencies include visionary leadership, sense of mission, effective change, political processes, negotiation, ethics and power, marketing and education, understanding of organizational dynamics, inter-organizational collaborating mechanisms, social forecasting, developing team-oriented systems, facilitation and mediation and serving as an effective team member.

== Target ==
The PLA is tailored for young physicians at the beginning of their professional careers. By instilling the principles of leadership in each generation, the PLA ensures a sound foundation for physicians' career development and also passes on these skills to those who are the most likely to make significant change in their communities and institutions.

== Objectives ==
- Be inspired to work with, and advance treatment for, children with ADHD and their families
- Be inspired to believe they can make a difference
- Understand the dynamics and process of making large-scale health care system change and the incremental steps to doing so
- Understand the functional, day-to-day behaviors of leadership
- Develop strategies for managing and resolving conflict
- Understand the dynamics and importance of effective teams

== Rationale ==
Most physicians are in positions of potential leadership. Reinertsen, in his article Physicians as Leaders in the Improvement of Health Care Systems, used a business-based definition of leadership, describing it as the ability to coordinate processes that begin an organization or facilitate an organization’s adaptation to changing circumstances. Whether serving in an academic medical center, working as a physician executive in a health plan or public health program, functioning as a partner in a group practice, collaborating on a community project, or advocating for effective health legislation, physicians have multiple opportunities to function as leaders in changing health care in the 21st century.

Despite these prospects, many physicians either have not taken on leadership roles or function ineffectively in those roles. Some have argued that the majority of administrative, organizational, team- building, and self-assessment skills of quality leaders are not taught in medical training programs. In fact, much of traditional medical curricula have emphasized autonomy in decision making, the individual physician-patient relationship, and hierarchical cultural processes that are counterproductive to effective leadership. In addition, although leadership development programs have been implemented in many sectors of the economy and have been accompanied by a rapid proliferation of both a scholarly evaluation and the popular inspirational literature, medicine has tended to act as though leadership were an innate characteristic and not a skill to be learned. Until recently, physicians who were interested in acquiring leadership skills training have had to search for programs in industries outside medicine.

== Principles ==
Kouze's and Posner's Five Practices of Exemplary Leadership model proves its effectiveness as a clear, evidence-based path to achieving the extraordinary—for individuals, teams, organizations, and communities. It turns the abstract concept of leadership into easy-to-grasp practices and behaviors that can be taught and learned by anyone willing to step up and accept the challenge to lead.

=== Model the Way ===
Leaders establish principles concerning the way people (constituents, peers, colleagues, and customers alike) should be treated and the way goals should be pursued. They create standards of excellence and then set an example for others to follow. Because the prospect of complex change can overwhelm people and stifle action, they set interim goals so that people can achieve small wins as they work toward larger objectives. They unravel bureaucracy when it impedes action; they put up signposts when people are unsure of where to go or how to get there; and they create opportunities for victory.

=== Inspire a Shared Vision ===
Leaders passionately believe that they can make a difference. They envision the future, creating an ideal and unique image of what the organization can become. Through their magnetism and quiet persuasion, leaders enlist others in their dreams. They breathe life into their visions and get people to see exciting possibilities for the future.

=== Challenge the Process ===
Leaders search for opportunities to change the status quo. They look for innovative ways to improve the organization. In doing so, they experiment and take risks. And because leaders know that risk taking involves mistakes and failures, they accept the inevitable disappointments as learning opportunities.

=== Enable Others to Act ===
Leaders foster collaboration and build spirited teams. They actively involve others. Leaders understand that mutual respect is what sustains extraordinary efforts; they strive to create an atmosphere of trust and human dignity. They strengthen others, making each person feel capable and powerful.

=== Encourage the Heart ===
Accomplishing extraordinary things in organizations is hard work. To keep hope and determination alive, leaders recognize contributions that individuals make. In every winning team, the members need to share in the rewards of their efforts, so leaders celebrate accomplishments. They make people feel like heroes.

== Impact ==
Since the PLA’s inception in 1999, over 3000 pediatric professionals in the United States have been trained, as well as 150 pediatricians and family physicians trained in Saudi Arabia in a joint initiative – the Saudi PLA Saudi Pediatric Leadership Alliance – between the AAP and the Saudi ADHD Society Saudi ADHD Society.
