= Josep Pla (composer) =

Spanish composer

Josep Pla i Agustí (c. 1728 – 1762) was a Spanish composer from Catalonia. He was the youngest of three composer-brothers: his older brother Joan Baptista Pla (1720–1773), was an oboist in Lisbon, and another older brother, Manuel Pla (c. 1725–1766), was harpsichordist at the court of Madrid.

== Works, editions and recordings ==
- Stabat Mater – recording Raquel Andueza, soprano, Pau Bordas, bass, Orquestra Barroca Catalana, dir. Olivia Centurioni, LMG 2011.
- Tono divino – Pedro, cuánto has dejado por seguir a tu maestro.

== Bibliography ==
- Dolcet, Josep. "L'obra dels germans Pla, bases per a una catalogació," Anuario Musical v. 42 (1987), p. 131–188. (includes thematic catalog of works)
