= Kënga Magjike 2018 =

Dates and venue
- Semi-final 1: 5 December 2018
- Semi-final 2: 6 December 2018
- Final: 8 December 2018
- Venue: Pallati i Kongreseve, Tirana

Organisation
- Host broadcaster: Televizioni Klan (TV Klan)
- Presenters: Ardit Gjebrea; Klaudia Pepa; Bora Zemani

Participants
- Number of entries: 47

Vote
- Voting system: Each contestant awards a number of 30 points to their favourite songs.
- Winning song: "Plas" by Flori Mumajesi

Kënga Magjike 2018 was the 20th edition of the annual Albanian music contest Kënga Magjike and was held between 5 December 2018 and 8 December 2018 at the Pallati i Kongreseve in Tirana. The three live shows were hosted by Ardit Gjebrea, Klaudia Pepa and Bora Zemani.

The winner of the contest was Flori Mumajesi with the song titled "Plas". This was his first victory in the contest as a singer though he was additionally the songwriter of the winning entries "Hape Vetën" by Aurela Gaçe in 2007 and "Ma Zgjat Dorën" by Eneda Tarifa in the following 2019 edition.

== Format ==
Kënga Magjike 2018, organised by Televizioni Klan (TV Klan), was the twentieth consecutive edition of the annual contest. The two semi-finals and grand final were held at the Pallati i Kongreseve in Tirana on 5, 6 and 8 December 2018 respectively.

== Final ==
The grand final took place on the 8th of December 2018 at the Pallati i Kongreseve in Tirana.

Key: Winner Second place Third place

Artist(s)	Song	Place	Points
Flori Mumajesi	"Plas"	1	1092
Aurela Gaçe & Eli Fara	"Zemra rratatata"	2	863
Fifi and MC Kresha	"Psikopatja jote"	3	834
Ronela Hajati	"Vuj"	4	677
Kejsi Tola	"Më ke mua"	5	645
Era Rusi	"Mos ma merr"	6	595
Rozana Radi	"Kur përfundon një dashuri si kjo e jona"	7	557
Olsi Bylyku & Lorenc Hasrama	"Si të flas"	8	551
Artjola Toska & Bruno	"Digjem"	9	536
Krusita	"Akull"	10	504
Mentor Haziri	"Më ke vra"	11	448
Klajdi Haruni	"Nuk të dua dot më pak"	12	445
Ardit Cuni & Daniela Toci	"Qaj"	14	438
Wendi Mancaku	"Ëndrra ime"	15	407
Erik Lloshi	"Mos urre"	16	369
Manuel Moscati & Matteo Becucci	"Sempre"	17	349
Flori Nazifi & Inis Neziri	"Fli në krahët e mi"	18	342
Venera Lumani	"Lind për ty"	19	338
Revolt Klan	"Ndriço"	20	334
Rovena Dilo & Onat	"Ma jo"	21	302
Robert Aliaj	"Ah ku më hodhi zoti"	22	270
Kanita	"S'jemi ne"	23	254
Alar Band & Livia	"Të duam ty"	24	244
Kelly	"Ma ka fajin zemra"	25	210
Kastro Zizo	"Sonata e gjumit"	26	196
Mishela Rapo & Ergys Shahu	"Dashni e rrallë"	27	165
Genti Deda	"Sa t'kam dasht"	28	156
Sergio HD	"Love Don't Matter"	29	140
Viola	"Ai"	30	137
Giorgia Igliozzi	"Equidistante"	31	130
Amela Agastra	"Më ler"	32	127
Gerald Celibashi	"Diamante në sirtar"	33	125
Henri Mahmuti	"Nuk kthehët pas"	34	115
Xhon Jesku	"Ty nuk të kam"	35	110
Marko Strazimiri	"4 0 3"	36	109
J Gashi	"Hola"	37	89
Rigersa Zefi	"Të kam humb"	38	85
ROD	"Engjëll"	39	73
Xhoi	"Aq sa më do"	40	71
Lidia Lufi	"Duaj"	41	71
Silvi Mema	"Për ty"	42	27
