= Plass =

Defunct American motor vehicle manufacturer

The Plass was an American vehicle manufactured in 1895 by Reuben H. Plass.

== Background ==
Reuben Hopkins Plass was born in Hudson, New York around the year 1840. At the beginning of the Civil War on 26 April 1861, he was a Lieutenant in Company A of the 7th New York Volunteer Infantry Regiment. After serving for a few months, on 3 June, he returned to work for his father, John T. Plass, during the war making cannon and gun blocks. He claimed to have built his first car in the 1860s. He held patents from 1869 for a velocipede and 1874 for a gas governor. After the war, Plass and his father manufactured bandsaws. Between 1893 and 1895, Plass unsuccessfully sought appointment as a Consul-General to Cuba.

In 1897, Plass invented a luminous lifeline for night use in sea rescues. By January 1899, Plass was bankrupt. In June, he was present at the forming of the Automobile Club of America.

Plass fell ill in 1904 and died from this illness on August 27, 1907 in Kings County, New York at the age of 67. His wife, Isabella Caroline James, survived him.

== Vehicle and designs ==
The Plass patent was for a rear-engined phaeton with an L-shaped tiller designed to be steered by either hand or foot. In 1895 Plass designed and patented a self-propelled sleigh with centre wheels and runners at the front and rear, an idea reasonably similar to the concept of modern snowmobiles. In 1899 he patented a single seat dog-cart design with a mid engine.
