= Dunja Ilić =

Serbian singer-songwriter and author (born 1991)

Dunja Ilić Дуња Илић
- Also known as: Ajla Begović
- Born: 10 September 1991 (age 34); Belgrade, SR Serbia, SFR Yugoslavia
- Genres: Gothic-folk; pop; pop-folk
- Occupations: Singer-songwriter; author
- Instrument: Vocals
- Years active: 2009–present
- Labels: FM Sound Production; City Records; K::CN Records
- Spouse: Saša Grujić (m. 2014; div. 2015)

Dunja Ilić (Serbian Cyrillic: Дуња Илић; born 10 September 1991), also known as Ajla Begović (Serbian Cyrillic: Ајла Беговић), is a Serbian singer-songwriter and author. She began her professional music career in 2009 with the release of her debut single "Bidermajer". Ilić has released four studio albums: Misterija (2010), Živim na ivici (2011), Gladna tvoje ljubavi (2013), and Sitna slova (2026). In addition to her music career, she is also an author and has published three novels: Sat (2010), Božanstvena (2018), and Za gubitak (2019).

== Personal life ==
Ilić was born on 10 September 1991, in Belgrade. Even as a little girl, she had the desire to be a singer and to be involved in music, and she also wanted to deal with criminology.

Dunja comes from a family of intellectuals from her mother Mirjana and father Jovan, and she also has a brother, Tijan. In elementary school, she was extremely popular, but as she says, not as a princess from a fine family, but as an unbridled rebel. She went to choir and dramatic arts, but at the same time she developed her creativity and already at that age won the sympathy of those around her with her bold ideas.

At the age of 15, Dunja wrote the book Ludački pogled. At the age of sixteen, she wrote two more novels, Vatra and Ima nešto što mu nije rekla, but as her parents were divorcing during that period, and both novels seemed to be autobiographies, she gave up in order to protect her parents' privacy from the publication of the same, despite the insistence of publishing houses that the novels be published and appear at the book fair that year.

After that, she turns to school, completes two high school classes in one school year and decides to finally fulfill her childhood wishes and record her first song and music video.

She published her first published novel Sat in 2010.

She studied media culture at the University of Belgrade.

After three studio albums, over ten high-budget music videos, Dunja decided to retire from the music scene because she believes that making music in Serbia is unprofitable, and the way she would do it would cost a lot financially, and she doesn't have the money for it because her father went bankrupt and the money she invested in her music career was never returned.

After she retired from the music scene in 2013, in 2014 she fell in love within a week, got engaged, and after a month married Saša Grujić, and divorced a month later. She said that they didn't know each other enough because everything was going too fast, and they realized that they were quite different.

The second novel Božanstvena came into the hands of readers in December 2018, and already the following year she published the third novel Za gubitak.

== Music career ==
=== 2006–2010: Career beginnings ===
Since she wanted to be a singer from a young age, in 2006, at only 15 years old, she recorded two songs written for her by Marina Tucaković. However, Dunja's father Jovan did not allow them to be released in order to protect his daughter from the public. One of them, "Ubićeš me ti", surfaced later in 2011 on YouTube.

At the age of 18, Ilić recorded her debut single, "Bidermajer", in November 2009. The script for the video was written by herself, and features a scene of Ilić lying in a coffin after the murder of her boyfriend's lover. Later in an interview, she said that the song was not dedicated to an ex-boyfriend, but to her former friends who had betrayed her.

Shortly after the release of the debut single, Ilić released her debut studio album Misterija in February 2010 through FM Sound Production. The lyrics of all ten songs on the album were written by Ilić herself. The CD has sold over 25,000 copies. And in the same year, at the Beogradski Pobednik festival, she performed the song "Domino dama" and received an award as the most promising young star.

=== 2010–2011: Two hit singles and second studio album ===
In June 2010, Ilić recorded the single "Šefica podzemlja", which turned out to be her biggest commercial success and became her signature song. In November of the same year, she released the single "Nisam laka, maco".

Her second studio album Živim na ivici was released on 9 May 2011 by City Records. The high-budget music videos were recorded, making it the first visual album in the Balkans. The album is considered Ilić's most successful project in her career. The CD was printed in a circulation of 50,000 copies.

=== 2012–2013: Hit single and third studio album ===
In the summer of 2012, she recorded the single "Noć je, Zvezdana", which was also followed by a high-budget music video produced by the Visual Infinity company.

Ilić released her third studio album Gladna tvoje ljubavi on 18 July 2013 through KCN Records. The album is considered Ilić's most mature album in her career.

=== 2014–2015: Single, duet, farewell single and guest song in 2019 ===
Although shortly after the release of her third studio album in 2013, she announced to her fans that she was retiring from the music scene and variety shows, on 18 October 2014, she released the single "Nije me ubilo". Soon after, on 15 December 2014, she released the first duet of her career, "Milion promila" with Dmitri. She released her farewell single "Oči ledene" on 13 October 2015. In April 2019, she appeared as a featured artist on the track "Da li je to ljubav ili strast" by Stefan Dragojlović. The collaboration was Dragojlović's idea, as Ilić wrote the song.

== Discography ==
=== Studio albums ===
- Misterija (2010)
- Živim na ivici (2011)
- Gladna tvoje ljubavi (2013)
- Sitna slova (2026)

=== Non-album singles ===
- 2006: “Ubićeš me ti”
- 2006: “Daj, daj, daj”
- 2012: “Noć je, Zvezdana”
- 2014: “Nije me ubilo”

=== Collaborations ===
- 2014: “Milion promila” (guest appearance on Dimitri’s song)
- 2019: “Da li je to ljubav ili strast?” (guest appearance on Stefan Dragojlović’s song)

== Videography ==
- Bidermajer (2009)
- Misterija (2010)
- Šefica podzemlja (2010)
- Nisam laka, maco! (2010)
- Živim na ivici (2011)
- U dahu (2011)
- Navikla na poraze (2011)
- Euforija (2011)
- Pogledaj još jednom (2011)
- Zla, luda, kučka! (2011)
- Srce mekše od kašmira (2011)
- Ne stiže me kajanje (2011)
- Nisam na vreme priznala (2011)
- Noć je, Zvezdana (2012)
- Vrištaću (2013)

== Bibliography ==
- Sat (2010)
- Božanstvena (2018)
- Za gubitak (2019)

== Controversies ==
At the very beginning of her career in March 2010, she performed the song "Seks, smrt, pare, moć i slava" on Košava television, appearing in the clothes of a nun and at one point lifted her dress to reveal her panties and halter top. Then she caused general chaos in the public because many considered that move to be blasphemy, which Dunja immediately denied, saying that it was dedicated to girls who present themselves as "saints" and think the most about those 5 things that Dunja sang in the song.

In 2012, news broke that Dunja had converted to Islam.

Dunja was arrested in 2013 because she crashed a car in the Belgrade neighborhood of Senjak, which she was driving while drunk. She then hit a parked car with her Audi, the wheel of which came off due to the force of the impact. The police determined that she had more than two parts per thousand of alcohol in her blood.

On 30 August 2014, Dunja Ilić married Saša Grujić from Vranje and, after twelve days of married life, they divorced.

Ilić admitted that she was being treated for drugs and alcohol. She got so drunk several times that she ended up on a gastric lavage:

"The treatment was terribly difficult, as is any isolation. The crises were terrible, painful both mentally and physically. It is an indescribable feeling of helplessness".

In 2017, Dunja was brutally beaten in Pristina, where she lived at the time. She posted photos on her Facebook profile where she is posing bloody, scratched and disheveled. She claimed that she was beaten because she was defending Serbia.

On 19 September 2019, Dunja went live on Instagram and told her followers that she was going to die in half an hour because she drank a few pills with alcohol. Dunja's boyfriend at the time called an ambulance and the doctors managed to save her life. She later said in an interview that it was a moment of helplessness and that she would never think of taking her own life again.
