= Plaz =

Plaz is a surname. Notable people with the surname include:

- Alejandro Plaz (born 1955), Venezuelan activist
- Anton Wilhelm Plaz (1708–1784), German physician and botanist
