= Manuel Pla =

Spanish composer

Manuel Pla i Agustí (c. 1725-1766) was a Spanish (from Catalonia) composer, oboist, and harpsichordist at the court of Madrid. He was the middle of three composer-brothers: his older brother Joan Baptista Pla (1720-1773), settled as an oboist in Lisbon, and his younger brother was Josep (c. 1728 - 1762).

== Works, editions and recordings ==
- Salve Regina - recording Raquel Andueza, soprano, Pau Bordás, bass, Orquesta Barroca Catalana, dir. Olivia Centurioni, LMG 2011.
- Tonos divinos - Regocíjese el alma venturosa. Es tan sumo el amor de tu grandeza. Tres coronas admite de nuestro celo. etc.
