= Soni Malaj =

Albanian singer and songwriter (born 1981)

- Born: Sonja Malaj; 23 October 1981 (age 44); Tropojë, Albania
- Occupations: Singer, songwriter, dancer
- Years active: 1997–present
- Musical career
- Genres: Pop; Pop rock

Sonja "Soni" Malaj (born 23 October 1981), also known mononymously as Soni, is an Albanian singer, songwriter and dancer.

== Life and career ==
Soni Malaj was born on 23 October 1981 into an Albanian family in the city of Tropojë, then part of the People's Republic of Albania, present Albania. Her real name is Sonja Malaj. She spent her childhood until the age of 9 in Tropoja. The family then moved to Tirana where Soni would continue her career as a singer.

She has participated in competitions like "Top Fest" (2006), and she placed second in Kënga Magjike with Flori Mumajesi, with the song "Fluturimi 3470". After Serbian singer Marija Šerifović won Eurovision Song Contest 2007, there was speculation that her winning song Molitva was actually plagiarism of Soni Malaj's song Ndarja. Soni Malaj also won Top Fest 11.

She was a judge on the second, third and sixth seasons of the Albanian talent Show X Factor.

In 2018, Malaj unsuccessfully attempted to represent Albania in the Eurovision Song Contest 2019, after finishing fifth at the 57th edition of Festivali i Këngës with the song "Më e fortë". In March 2021, Televizioni Klan (TV Klan) announced her as one of the contestants selected to compete at the 22nd edition of Kënga Magjike.

== Discography ==
=== Albums ===
- Nuk qaj për ty (2002)
- Mbretëresha e natës (2003)
- E vogëla (2005)
- Mesdhe (2006)
- Unik (2010)

=== Singles ===
==== As lead artist ====
Title	Year	Peak chart positions	Album
Title	Year	ALB	Album
"Larg natës"	2004	—N/a	E vogëla
"Eja në Ballkan"	2004	—N/a	E vogëla
"Eja, eja"	2005	—N/a	E vogëla
"Zjarr"	2005	—N/a	Non-album singles
"Një me dy"	2006	—N/a	Non-album singles
"Ndarja"	2006	—N/a	Non-album singles
"Do të vij"	2006	—N/a	Non-album singles
"Të dua ty"	2007	—N/a	Non-album singles
"Fluturimi 3470" (with Flori Mumajesi)	2007	—N/a	Non-album singles
"Shpirti im binjak"	2008	—N/a	Non-album singles
"Me faj pa faj"	2008	—N/a	Non-album singles
"Zona zero"	2008	—N/a	Non-album singles
"Zemër e pa kurdisur"	2009	—N/a	Non-album singles
"Shukarije" (with Sinan Hoxha)	2012	—N/a	Non-album singles
"Jeto" (featuring Aldo)	2013	—N/a	Non-album singles
"Me të jeton"	2014	—N/a	Non-album singles
"Tulipani i bardhë" (featuring Saad Ramadan)	2014	—N/a	Non-album singles
"Me rrena"	2015	17	Non-album singles
"Me mua" (featuring Skivi)	2016	20	Non-album singles
"Ti, jeta" (featuring Gena)	2016	—	Non-album singles
"Për vete më mbaj"	2016	—	Non-album singles
"Përgjithmonë"	2017	35	Non-album singles
"Pa ty" (featuring Tim)	2017	—	Non-album singles
"Loca"	2017	30	Non-album singles
"Zeshkanja"	2017	60	Non-album singles
"En la intimidad" (featuring Jowell)	2018	79	Non-album singles
"Më e fortë"	2018	—	Non-album singles
"Ta fala" (featuring Agon Amiga and Daim Lala)	2019	—	Non-album singles
"Te quiero"	2019	—	Non-album singles
"Shije tradhëtie"	2019	—	Non-album singles
"Versioni im"	2021	—	Non-album singles
"Pak si..."	2021	3	Non-album singles
"—" denotes a recording that did not chart or was not released in that territory.

Awards and achievements
Preceded by Samanta Karavella with "Loti i fundit"	Top Fest; 2014	Succeeded by Ermal Fejzullahu, Lumi B and Ledri Vula with "Shko"
