= Rouze =

Commune in Occitanie, France

- Commune
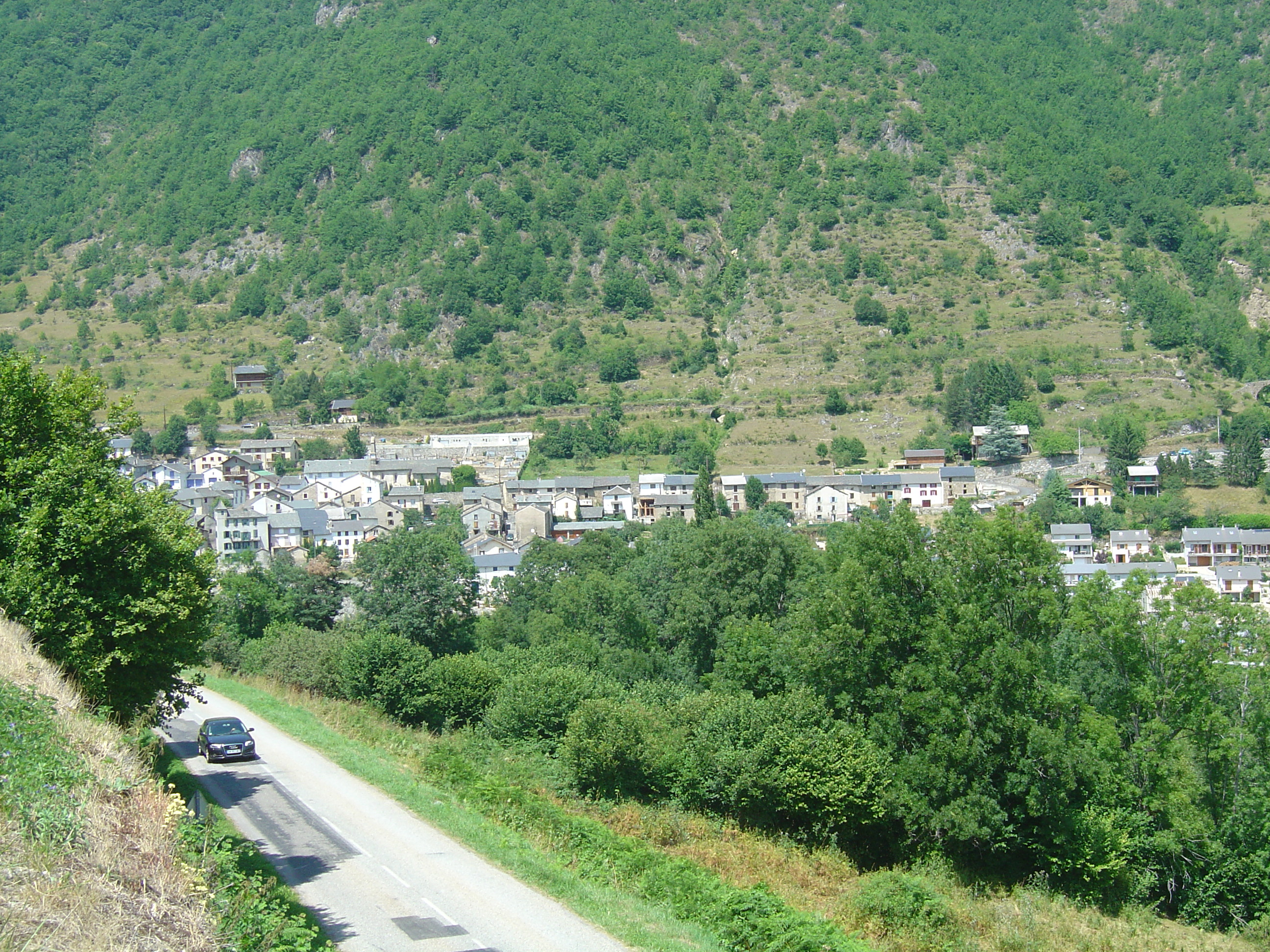
- A general view of Rouze
- Location of Rouze
- Location within France Location within Occitanie
- Coordinates: 42°43′56″N 2°04′16″E
- Country: France
- Region: Occitania
- Department: Ariège
- Arrondissement: Foix
- Canton: Haute-Ariège

Government
  - Mayor (2020–2026): Francis Magdalou
- Area^{1}: 9.51 km^{2} (3.67 sq mi)
- Elevation: 975 m (3,199 ft)
- Highest elevation: 1,882 m (6,175 ft)
- Lowest elevation: 729 m (2,392 ft)
- Population (2023): 83
  - Density: 8.7/km^{2} (23/sq mi)
- Time zone: UTC+01:00 (CET)
  - Summer (DST): UTC+02:00 (CEST)
- INSEE/Postal code: 09252 /09460
- ^{1} French Land Register data, which excludes lakes, ponds, glaciers > 1 km^{2} (0.386 sq mi or 247 acres) and river estuaries.

Rouze (French pronunciation: [ʁuz]; Languedocien: Rosa) is a commune in the Ariège department in southwestern France.

== Population ==
Inhabitants of Rouze are called Rouzéens in French.

Historical population
Year	Pop.	±% p.a.
1968	106	—
1975	93	−1.85%
1982	80	−2.13%
1990	79	−0.16%
1999	88	+1.21%
2007	92	+0.56%
2012	90	−0.44%
2017	85	−1.14%
2023	83	−0.40%
Source: INSEE

== See also ==
- Communes of the Ariège department
