= Le Pla =

Commune in Occitanie, France

- Commune
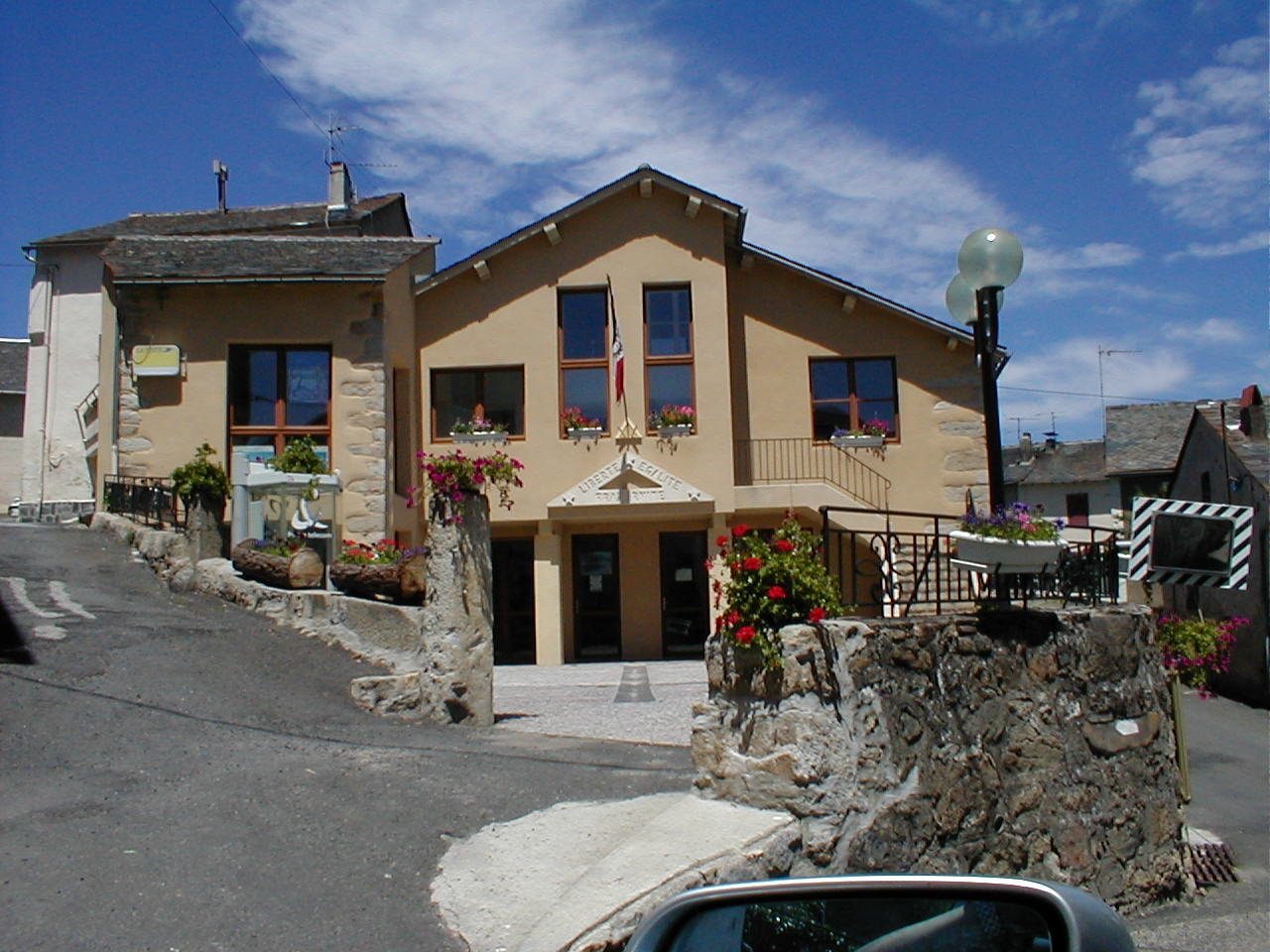
- The town hall in Le Pla
- Location of Le Pla
- Location within France Location within Occitanie
- Coordinates: 42°42′59″N 2°04′53″E
- Country: France
- Region: Occitania
- Department: Ariège
- Arrondissement: Foix
- Canton: Haute-Ariège

Government
  - Mayor (2020–2026): André Olive
- Area^{1}: 12.97 km^{2} (5.01 sq mi)
- Elevation: 1,075 m (3,527 ft)
- Highest elevation: 2,431 m (7,976 ft)
- Lowest elevation: 983 m (3,225 ft)
- Population (2023): 61
  - Density: 4.7/km^{2} (12/sq mi)
- Time zone: UTC+01:00 (CET)
  - Summer (DST): UTC+02:00 (CEST)
- INSEE/Postal code: 09230 /09460
- ^{1} French Land Register data, which excludes lakes, ponds, glaciers > 1 km^{2} (0.386 sq mi or 247 acres) and river estuaries.

Le Pla (French pronunciation: [lə pla]; Occitan: Al Plan) is a commune in the Ariège department in southwestern France.

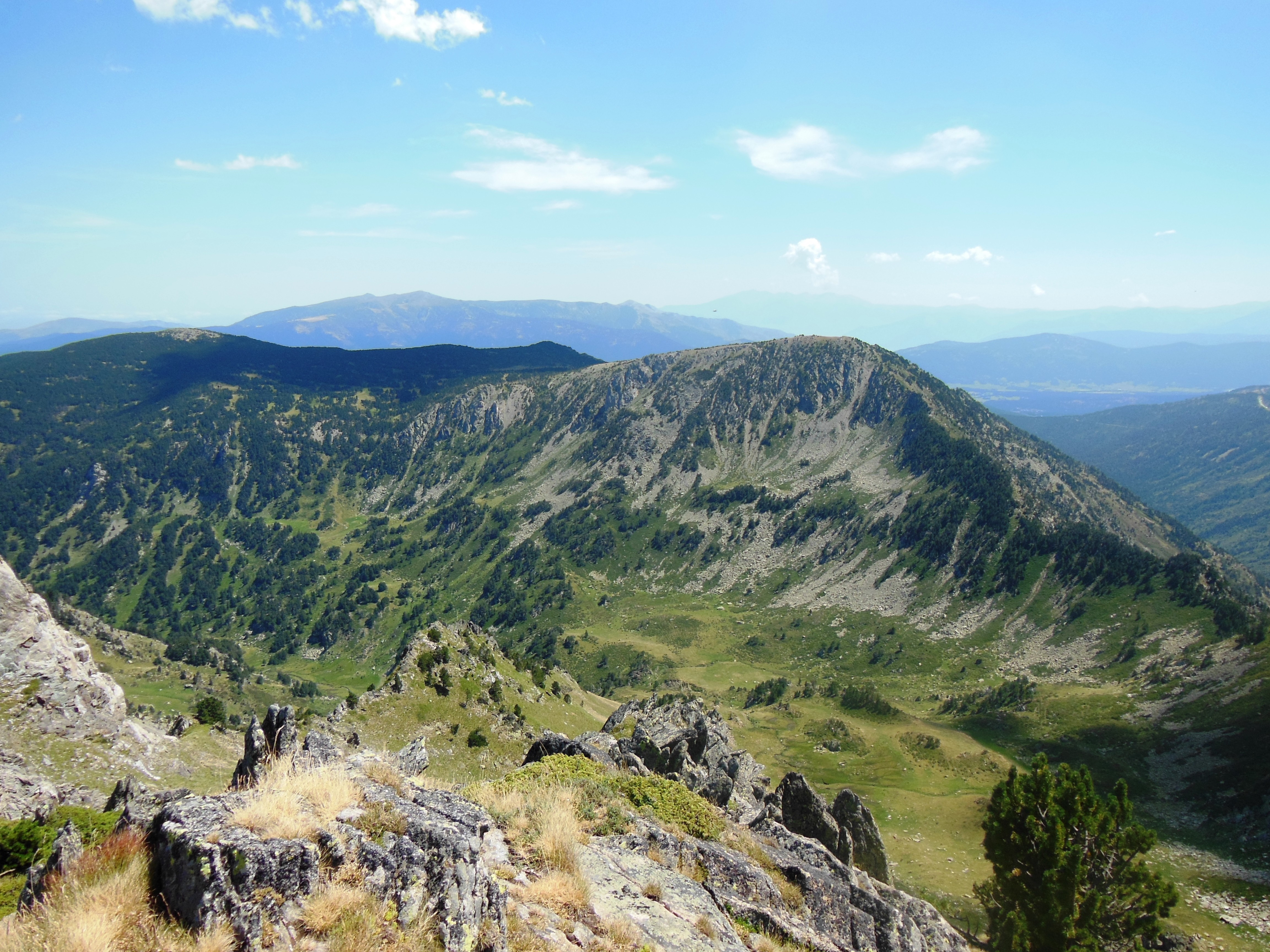
Puig del Pla de Bernat, at 2436 metres the highest point in the commune.

== Population ==
Inhabitants of Le Pla are called Pléens in French.

Historical population
Year	Pop.	±% p.a.
1968	86	—
1975	64	−4.13%
1982	71	+1.49%
1990	75	+0.69%
1999	79	+0.58%
2007	78	−0.16%
2012	53	−7.44%
2017	55	+0.74%
2023	61	+1.74%
Source: INSEE

== See also ==
- Communes of the Ariège department
