= Plas (song) =

2018 single by Flori Mumajesi

Single by Flori Mumajesi
- Released: 2 December 2018
- Genre: Pop
- Length: 3:05
- Label: Threedots
- Songwriter: Flori Mumajesi
- Producer: Flori Mumajesi

Flori Mumajesi singles chronology
"Shanghai" (2018)	"Plas" (2018)	"Mori" (2019)

Music video
- "Plas" on YouTube

"Plas" (Albanian pronunciation: [plas]; transl. I'm bursting) is a song by Albanian singer and songwriter Flori Mumajesi released as a single on 2 December 2018 by Threedots. The song won the 20th edition of Kënga Magjike.

== Background and composition ==
Lasting three minutes and five seconds, "Plas" was solely written and produced by Mumajesi himself. It was digitally released as a single through Universal Music and Onima under exclusive license from Threedots Productions. Musically, "Plas" is an Albanian language pop ballad.

== Critical reception ==
Upon its victory at Kënga Magjike, "Plas" was met with universal acclaim from music critics. A writer for SoundsEuropean! praised Mumajesi's vocal delivery and described the song a "delicate ballad", which allows the singer to demonstrates his "quality" and "emotional" vocals.

== Kënga Magjike ==
The 20th edition of Kënga Magjike was organised by Televizioni Klan (TV Klan) and consisted of two semi-finals on 5 and 6 December, respectively, and the grand final on 8 December 2018. The song won with 1092 points the grand final of the competition, the second longest-running annual song contest in Albania. It was Flori's first victory in the contest as a singer though he was additionally the songwriter of the winning entry "Hape Vetën" by Aurela Gaçe in 2007.

== Personnel ==
Credits adapted from Tidal and YouTube.

- Flori Mumajesi – composing, producing, songwriting, vocals

== Track listing ==
- Digital download
1. "Plas" – 3:08

== Release history ==
Region	Date	Format	Label	Ref.
Various	2 December 2018	Digital download; streaming	Threedots	
