= Flori Mumajesi =

Albanian composer, singer and songwriter

- Born: 23 August 1982 (age 44); Tirana, Albania
- Other name: Flori
- Occupations: Singer; songwriter; composer; producer; recording artist
- Years active: 1998–2021
- Notable work: Discography; Production discography
- Awards: Full list
- Musical career
- Genres: Alternative rock; pop rock; balkan pop-folk; dance pop
- Instruments: Vocals
- Label: Threedots Production

Florjan Mumajesi (Albanian pronunciation: [flɔɾian mumajɛsi]; born 23 August 1982), known professionally as Flori, is an Albanian recording artist, composer, producer and singer. Born and raised in Tirana, Mumajesi began his career at an early age and rose to widespread acclaim after his participations in Kënga Magjike and his eventual win in 2018. He resumed his earlier career in 2011 with his debut studio album "Detaj" which incorporated musical elements from all of his previous records.

Mumajesi established his own record label "Threedots" with whom he produced more than a dozen records for many recording artists across Albania and the Balkans. He is the recipient of numerous awards and accolades including the Balkan Music Award, Kënga Magjike Award and Top Fest Award.

== Life and career ==
Mumajesi was born on August 23, 1982, into an Albanian family in the city of Tirana, then part of the People's Republic of Albania, present Albania. He showed great interest in performing and recording music at an early age. He made his professional debut in 1998 as a member of the boy group "The Dreams" with whom he participated at Festivali i Këngës in 2000 and Kënga Magjike in 2001.

He later reached his fame in the Albanian music industry as a solo singer and later as a composer. He participated in Kënga Magjike in 2002 and continued collaborating with different artists. He won an award at Kënga Magjike not only for his own song and interpretation, but also for songs composed for other artists. He worked as manager for Soni Malaj for a period of time. Together with a few other music professionals in Albania, he decided to open his record-label, named Threedots Production where the most famous artists of the country and others were signed.

From the beginning of his solo career he had huge success in Albania. However, after releasing "Tallava", "Playback" and "Me Zemër" he received even greater recognition from the public for his interesting genre, a mix of dance music, R&B and other modern beats.

He received international attention after his work was seen on the Bulgarian Balkanika TV, Balkan's biggest music channel. After his successful debut, he received multiple nominations at Balkan Music Awards for his contribution in 2009 for the Balkan music. At the ceremony his song "Playback" won "Best song from Albania" and ranked second as the best song from Balkans. A year later, he was also nominated as the composer of "Origjinale" from Aurela Gaçe. In the ceremony, the songs was announced as the Best Song from Balkans for 2010.

== Discography ==
- Detaj (2011)

== See also ==
- Flori Mumajesi videography
- Flori Mumajesi production discography
- List of awards and nominations received by Flori Mumajesi
