= X Factor (Albanian TV series) season 5 =

X Factor
- Season 5
- Presented by: Alketa Vejsiu
- Judges: Adi Krasta; Arilena Ara; Elhaida Dani; Young Zerka; Vesa Luma (guest); Zhani Ciko (guest); Manjola Nallbani (guest)
- Winner: Alis Kallaçi
- Winning mentor: Arilena Ara
- Runner-up: Jetmir Kanani

Release
- Original network: TV Klan
- Original release: 8 December 2023 – 19 April 2024

Season chronology
- ← Previous; Season 4 Next → Season 6

The fifth season of the Albanian television music competition X Factor began airing on TV Klan on 8 December 2023, after nine years hiatus. Alketa Vejsiu returned as the presenter. The new judges were Adi Krasta, Arilena Ara, Elhaida Dani and Young Zerka, who replaced departing judges Alban Skënderaj, Bleona Qereti, Miriam Cani and Pandi Laço.

On 19 April 2024, Alis Kallaçi from team Arilena Ara won the season.

== Judges and presenters ==
On 2022, it was announced by Alketa Vejsiu to revive the series in 2023, following a nine-year hiatus on TV Klan and that she will return as the host and the auditions will be held in Albania and Kosovo.

Several artists were rumored to be part of the judging panel once TV Klan announced the show. After being a judge on the fourth season, Bleona and the winner of the second season, Arilena Ara were the first to be rumored. Also Yll Limani, who participated on the first season of The Voice of Albania, was in the running for the judging panel. On the running were also Adi Krasta, Ermal Mamaqi and Klaudia Pepa.

On 8 November 2023, it was announced that Adi Krasta will be in the judging panel. Later, was also announced that Arilena Ara, who won the second season of the X Factor, will be a judge. Also on the same day, it was announced that the third judge will be Elhaida Dani. Then TV Klan announced the fourth judge of the season, and was Young Zerka. The following day, it was confirmed that Vesa Luma, who had been on the panel on the first season would join the main judges only in the auditions. On 14 November 2023, it was announced that Zhani Ciko, will be on the panel only in the auditions. Manjola Nallbani filled in for Dani while she was away on her tour for week 4 of the live shows.

== Selection process ==
=== Open auditions ===
The show began staging producers' audition days in October 2023 across Albania, Kosovo and North Macedonia.

Auditions with Producers
City	Date(s)
Shkodër	19 October 2023
Korçë	20 October 2023
Vlorë	23 October 2023
Durrës	24 October 2023
Elbasan	25 October 2023
Pristina, Kosovo	26 October 2023
Skopje, North Macedonia	27 October 2023
Tirana	31 October 2023

=== Judges' auditions ===
The auditionees chosen by the producers were invited back to the last set of arena auditions that took place in front of the judges. These auditions began filming on 8 November 2023 and were held in Tirana. The three episodes began broadcast on TV Klan from 8 December 2023 until 22 December 2023. On the second episode, Vesa Luma was a guest judge in place of Adi Krasta and on the third episode, Zhani Ciko was a guest judge in place of Young Zerka.

=== Judges' Houses ===
On 14 November 2023, X Factor screenwriter Ilda Lumani announced that compared to previous seasons, the Groups category has been removed. The final round of the selection process, the judges' houses were filmed in late November 2023. At the start of Judges' Houses, the judges discovered which categories they would mentor: Elhaida Dani was given the Girls, Arilena Ara was given the Boys and Young Zerka was given the Mix. Adi Krasta would not mentor a category. On the first episode of judges' houses, each act performed one song to their mentor and guest mentor. Dani was assisted by Pirro Çako, Ara was assisted by Noizy and Zerka was assisted by other judge Krasta. After the performances, on the second episode the judges revealed which acts they put through to the live shows.

Each mentor had 10 acts on their category, and had to choose 5 to take with them on to the live shows.

Three acts from the Boys category who did not pass the judges' houses (Jonid Gjoka, Giovanni Orefice and Rosario Canale), were assigned to be in a Group named The Chemicals, and were taken to the live shows under the mentorship of Elhaida Dani.

The two judges' houses episodes were broadcast on 29 December 2023 and on 5 January 2024.

=== Vocal coaches ===
- Egzona Ademi - Mix (Zerka)
- Kamela Islamaj - Boys (Ara)
- Landi Kademi - Girls, Groups (Dani)

== Acts ==
Key:

– Winner
– Runner-Up
– 3rd Place

Act	Age(s)	Hometown	Category (mentor)	Result
Alis Kallaçi	21	Shkodër	Boys (Ara)	Winner
Jetmir Kanani	23	Tirana	Mix (Zerka)	Runner-Up
Kleansa Susaj	17	Tirana	Girls (Dani)	3rd Place
Niki Zaimi	20	Tirana	Boys (Ara)	4th Place
Anisa Shabani	19	Ferizaj	Girls (Dani)	5th-6th Place
The Chemicals	15, 19, 31	Various	Groups (Dani)	5th-6th Place
Frank Ibrahimi	22	Vlorë	Mix (Zerka)	7th Place
Ingrid Havalja	23	Shkodër	Mix (Zerka)	8th Place
Kevin Malo	18	Struga	Boys (Ara)	9th Place
Wendy Zylaj	18	Shkodër	Girls (Dani)	10th Place
Gent Disha	22	Bulqizë	Boys (Ara)	11th Place
Alba Dajlani	22	Pogradec	Mix (Zerka)	12th-13th Place
Kejsi Jazxhi	18	Tirana	Girls (Dani)	12th-13th Place
Aldo Prendushi	22	Shkodër	Boys (Ara)	14th Place
Luna Çausholli	18	Tirana	Girls (Dani)	15th Place
Borana Xhemali	27	Korçë	Mix (Zerka)	16th Place

Ages shown above correspond to the beginning of the competition.

== Live shows ==
=== Results summary ===
Colour key

Act in team Arilena Ara

Act in team Elhaida Dani

Act in team Young Zerka

Act was in the bottom two and had to perform again in the sing-off
Act received the fewest public votes and was immediately eliminated (no sing-off)
Act received the most public votes

Weekly results per act
Act	Week 1	Week 2	Week 3	Week 4	Week 5	Week 6	Week 7	Week 8	Week 9	Week 10	Week 11	Week 12	Week 13	Semi-Final	Final	
Act	Week 1	Week 2	Week 3	Week 4	Week 5	Week 6	Week 7	Week 8	Week 9	Week 10	Week 11	Week 12	Week 13	Semi-Final	Round 1	Round 2
Alis Kallaçi	Safe	Safe	Safe	Safe	Safe	Safe	Safe	Safe	Safe	Safe	Safe	Safe	Safe	Safe	Safe	Winner (final)
Jetmir Kanani	Safe	Safe	Bottom two	Safe	Safe	Safe	Safe	Safe	Safe	Safe	Safe	Safe	Safe	Safe	Safe	Runner-Up (final)
Kleansa Susaj	Safe	Safe	Safe	Safe	Safe	Safe	Safe	Safe	Safe	Safe	Safe	Safe	Safe	Safe	3rd	Eliminated (final)
Niki Zaimi	Safe	Safe	Safe	Safe	Bottom two	Safe	Safe	Safe	Safe	Safe	Safe	Safe	Safe	4th	Eliminated (semi-final)	
Anisa Shabani	Safe	Safe	Safe	Safe	Safe	Safe	Safe	Safe	Bottom two	Safe	Safe	Safe	5th-6th	Eliminated (week 13)		
The Chemicals	Safe	Safe	Safe	Safe	Safe	Safe	Safe	Safe	Safe	7th	Bottom two	Safe	5th-6th	Eliminated (week 13)		
Frank Ibrahimi	Safe	Safe	Safe	13th	Safe	Safe	Safe	Safe	Safe	Safe	Bottom two	Eliminated (week 11)				
Ingrid Havalja	Safe	Safe	Safe	Safe	Safe	Safe	10th	Safe	Safe	8th	Eliminated (week 10)					
Kevin Malo	Safe	Safe	Safe	Safe	Safe	Safe	Safe	9th	Bottom two	Eliminated (week 9)						
Wendy Zylaj	Safe	Safe	Safe	Safe	Safe	Safe	Safe	10th	Eliminated (week 8)							
Gent Disha	Safe	Safe	Safe	Safe	Safe	Safe	11th	Eliminated (week 7)								
Alba Dajlani	Safe	Safe	Safe	Safe	Safe	12th-13th	Eliminated (week 6)									
Kejsi Jazxhi	Safe	Bottom two	Safe	Safe	Bottom two	12th-13th	Eliminated (week 6)									
Aldo Prendushi	Safe	Safe	Safe	14th	Eliminated (week 4)											
Luna Çausholli	Safe	Safe	Bottom two	Eliminated (week 3)												
Borana Xhemali	Safe	Bottom two	Eliminated (week 2)													
Final Showdown	None ^{1}	Jazxhi, Xhemali	Çausholli, Kanani	Ibrahimi, Prendushi	Jazxhi, Zaimi	No sing-off or judges' votes: results were based on public votes alone	Disha, Havalja	Malo, Zylaj	Malo, Shabani	Havalja, Chemicals	Ibrahimi, Chemicals	None ^{1}	No sing-off or judges' votes: results were based on public votes alone			
Judges voted to	None ^{1}	Eliminate				No sing-off or judges' votes: results were based on public votes alone	Eliminate					None ^{1}	No sing-off or judges' votes: results were based on public votes alone			
Zerka's vote	None ^{1}	Jazxhi	Çausholli	Prendushi	Jazxhi	No sing-off or judges' votes: results were based on public votes alone	Disha	Zylaj	Malo	Chemicals	Chemicals	None ^{1}	No sing-off or judges' votes: results were based on public votes alone			
Dani's vote	None ^{1}	Xhemali	Kanani	—N/a	Zaimi	No sing-off or judges' votes: results were based on public votes alone	Havalja	Malo	Malo	Havalja	Ibrahimi	None ^{1}	No sing-off or judges' votes: results were based on public votes alone			
Nallbani's vote	None ^{1}	—N/a		Prendushi	—N/a	No sing-off or judges' votes: results were based on public votes alone	—N/a					None ^{1}	No sing-off or judges' votes: results were based on public votes alone			
Ara's vote	None ^{1}	Xhemali	Çausholli	Ibrahimi	Jazxhi	No sing-off or judges' votes: results were based on public votes alone	Havalja	Zylaj	Shabani	Havalja	Ibrahimi	None ^{1}	No sing-off or judges' votes: results were based on public votes alone			
Krasta's vote	None ^{1}	Xhemali	Çausholli	Ibrahimi	Zaimi	No sing-off or judges' votes: results were based on public votes alone	Disha	Malo	Malo	Chemicals	Ibrahimi	None ^{1}	No sing-off or judges' votes: results were based on public votes alone			
Eliminated	None ^{1}	Borana Xhemali; 3 of 4 votes Majority	Luna Çausholli; 3 of 4 votes Majority	Aldo Prendushi; 2 of 4 votes Deadlock	Eviction cancelled ^{2}	Alba Dajlani; Public vote to save	Gent Disha; 2 of 4 votes Deadlock	Wendy Zylaj; 2 of 4 votes Deadlock	Kevin Malo; 3 of 4 votes Majority	Ingrid Havalja; 2 of 4 votes Deadlock	Frank Ibrahimi; 3 of 4 votes Majority	None ^{1}	Anisa Shabani; Public vote to save	Niki Zaimi; Public vote to save	Kleansa Susaj; Public vote to win	Jetmir Kanani; Public vote to win
Eliminated	None ^{1}	Borana Xhemali; 3 of 4 votes Majority	Luna Çausholli; 3 of 4 votes Majority	Aldo Prendushi; 2 of 4 votes Deadlock	Eviction cancelled ^{2}	Kejsi Jazxhi; Public vote to save	Gent Disha; 2 of 4 votes Deadlock	Wendy Zylaj; 2 of 4 votes Deadlock	Kevin Malo; 3 of 4 votes Majority	Ingrid Havalja; 2 of 4 votes Deadlock	Frank Ibrahimi; 3 of 4 votes Majority	None ^{1}	The Chemicals; Public vote to save	Niki Zaimi; Public vote to save	Kleansa Susaj; Public vote to win	Jetmir Kanani; Public vote to win

- ^1 In this live show, there was no elimination. Viewers could still vote, and the votes went on and were counted in the next live show, where the elimination took place.
- ^2 With the acts in the sing-off receiving two votes each, the result went to deadlock and reverted to the earlier public vote. Both acts had the same public votes, so was decided that none of the acts would be eliminated.

=== Live show details ===
==== Week 1 (12 January) ====
Acts' performances on the first live show
Act	Category (mentor)	Order	Song	Result
Borana Xhemali	Mix (Zerka)	1	"Don't Go Yet"	Safe
Alis Kallaçi	Boys (Ara)	2	"Blue Suede Shoes"	Safe
Jetmir Kanani	Mix (Zerka)	3	"Creep"	Safe
Wendy Zylaj	Girls (Dani)	4	"Escapism"	Safe
Aldo Prendushi	Boys (Ara)	5	"Harrom"	Safe
Niki Zaimi	Boys (Ara)	6	"Zitti e buoni"	Safe
Kleansa Susaj	Girls (Dani)	7	"S'je më"	Safe
The Chemicals	Groups (Dani)	8	"Believer"	Safe
Alba Dajlani	Mix (Zerka)	9	"Control"	Safe
Frank Ibrahimi	Mix (Zerka)	10	"Kuturu"	Safe
Ingrid Havalja	Mix (Zerka)	11	"Bitch Better Have My Money"	Safe
Kejsi Jazxhi	Girls (Dani)	12	"Her Lies"	Safe
Kevin Malo	Boys (Ara)	13	"Daddy"	Safe
Anisa Shabani	Girls (Dani)	14	"Mamma Knows Best"	Safe
Luna Çausholli	Girls (Dani)	15	"Jolene" / "Anna"	Safe
Gent Disha	Boys (Ara)	16	"She Got Me"	Safe

==== Week 2 (19 January) ====
Acts' performances on the second live show
Act	Category (mentor)	Order	Song	Result
Anisa Shabani	Girls (Dani)	1	"Hape veten ti"	Safe
Frank Ibrahimi	Mix (Zerka)	2	"(I Can't Get No) Satisfaction"	Safe
Gent Disha	Boys (Ara)	3	"In My Blood"	Safe
Alba Dajlani	Mix (Zerka)	4	"I Just Want to Make Love to You"	Safe
The Chemicals	Groups (Dani)	5	"See You Again"	Safe
Kevin Malo	Boys (Ara)	6	"Let It Be"	Safe
Jetmir Kanani	Mix (Zerka)	7	"Uptown Funk"	Safe
Wendy Zylaj	Girls (Dani)	8	"Bird Set Free"	Safe
Alis Kallaçi	Boys (Ara)	9	"Stand Up"	Safe
Kejsi Jazxhi	Girls (Dani)	10	"Spectrum (Say My Name)"	Bottom Two
Borana Xhemali	Mix (Zerka)	11	"Zhurmë"	Bottom Two
Niki Zaimi	Boys (Ara)	12	"Baladë për Jakup Ferrin"	Safe
Kleansa Susaj	Girls (Dani)	13	"Water"	Safe
Luna Çausholli	Girls (Dani)	14	"Symphony"	Safe
Ingrid Havalja	Mix (Zerka)	15	"Love in the Dark"	Safe
Aldo Prendushi	Boys (Ara)	16	"Faith"	Safe
Sing-off details
Kejsi Jazxhi	Girls (Dani)	1	"Spectrum (Say My Name)"	Saved
Borana Xhemali	Mix (Zerka)	2	"Zhurmë"	Eliminated

Judges' votes to eliminate

- Krasta: Borana Xhemali
- Ara: Borana Xhemali
- Dani: Borana Xhemali
- Zerka: Kejsi Jazxhi

==== Week 3 (26 January) ====
Acts' performances on the third live show
Act	Category (mentor)	Order	Song	Result
Jetmir Kanani	Mix (Zerka)	1	"Dirty Diana"	Bottom Two
Frank Ibrahimi	Mix (Zerka)	2	"Your Man"	Safe
Alis Kallaçi	Boys (Ara)	3	"Burn"	Safe
Kejsi Jazxhi	Girls (Dani)	4	"Purple Rain"	Safe
Kevin Malo	Boys (Ara)	5	"A Lot More Free"	Safe
The Chemicals	Groups (Dani)	6	"L'ombelico del mondo"	Safe
Ingrid Havalja	Mix (Zerka)	7	"Shaj"	Safe
Gent Disha	Boys (Ara)	8	"Buzët e kuqe"	Safe
Alba Dajlani	Mix (Zerka)	9	"Il est où le bonheur"	Safe
Wendy Zylaj	Girls (Dani)	10	"Ika larg"	Safe
Niki Zaimi	Boys (Ara)	11	"Thunderstruck"	Safe
Kleansa Susaj	Girls (Dani)	12	"Scars to Your Beautiful"	Safe
Aldo Prendushi	Boys (Ara)	13	"When a Man Loves a Woman"	Safe
Anisa Shabani	Girls (Dani)	14	"Holding Out for a Hero"	Safe
Luna Çausholli	Girls (Dani)	15	"Oceans (Where Feet May Fail)"	Bottom Two
Sing-off details
Jetmir Kanani	Mix (Zerka)	1	"Dirty Diana"	Saved
Luna Çausholli	Girls (Dani)	2	"Oceans (Where Feet May Fail)"	Eliminated

Judges' votes to eliminate

- Krasta: Luna Çausholli
- Ara: Luna Çausholli
- Dani: Jetmir Kanani
- Zerka: Luna Çausholli

==== Week 4 (2 February) ====
Acts' performances on the fourth live show
Act	Category (mentor)	Order	Song	Result
Kevin Malo	Boys (Ara)	1	"Morphine"	Safe
Ingrid Havalja	Mix (Zerka)	2	"Earth Song"	Safe
Alis Kallaçi	Boys (Ara)	3	"Impossible"	Safe
Kleansa Susaj	Girls (Dani)	4	"Bleeding Love"	Safe
Jetmir Kanani	Mix (Zerka)	5	"Rise Up"	Safe
Kejsi Jazxhi	Girls (Dani)	6	"Take Me to Church"	Safe
Frank Ibrahimi	Mix (Zerka)	7	"Unchain My Heart"	Bottom Two
Aldo Prendushi	Boys (Ara)	8	"Let It Go"	Bottom Two
Wendy Zylaj	Girls (Dani)	9	"Hot Right Now"	Safe
Gent Disha	Boys (Ara)	10	"Arcade"	Safe
Anisa Shabani	Girls (Dani)	11	"Bileta"	Safe
Alba Dajlani	Mix (Zerka)	12	"Tomlin e nanës"	Safe
The Chemicals	Groups (Dani)	13	"Cake by the Ocean"	Safe
Niki Zaimi	Boys (Ara)	14	"My Songs Know What You Did in the Dark (Light Em Up)"	Safe
Sing-off details
Frank Ibrahimi	Mix (Zerka)	1	"Unchain My Heart"	Saved
Aldo Prendushi	Boys (Ara)	2	"Let It Go"	Eliminated

Judges' votes to eliminate

- Krasta: Frank Ibrahimi
- Ara: Frank Ibrahimi
- Nalbani: Aldo Prendushi
- Zerka: Aldo Prendushi

With the acts in the sing-off receiving two votes each, the result went to deadlock and reverted to the earlier public vote. Aldo Prendushi was eliminated as the act with the fewest public votes.

==== Week 5 (9 February) ====
Acts' performances on the fifth live show
Act	Category (mentor)	Order	Song	Result
Anisa Shabani	Girls (Dani)	1	"I Have Nothing"	Safe
Gent Disha	Boys (Ara)	2	"Say Something"	Safe
The Chemicals	Groups (Dani)	3	"Mesazh"	Safe
Jetmir Kanani	Mix (Zerka)	4	"It's a Man's Man's Man's World"	Safe
Wendy Zylaj	Girls (Dani)	5	"Billie Jean"	Safe
Ingrid Havalja	Mix (Zerka)	6	"Welcome to Burlesque"	Safe
Alba Dajlani	Mix (Zerka)	7	"Nature Boy"	Safe
Kleansa Susaj	Girls (Dani)	8	"God Is a Woman"	Safe
Kevin Malo	Boys (Ara)	9	"Knockin' on Heaven's Door"	Safe
Frank Ibrahimi	Mix (Zerka)	10	"Wicked Game"	Safe
Alis Kallaçi	Boys (Ara)	11	"Suus"	Safe
Kejsi Jazxhi	Girls (Dani)	12	"River"	Bottom Two
Niki Zaimi	Boys (Ara)	13	"Always"	Bottom Two
Sing-off details
Kejsi Jazxhi	Girls (Dani)	1	"River"	Saved
Niki Zaimi	Boys (Ara)	2	"Always"	Saved

Judges' votes to eliminate

- Krasta: Niki Zaimi
- Ara: Kejsi Jazxhi
- Dani: Niki Zaimi
- Zerka: Kejsi Jazxhi

With the acts in the sing-off receiving two votes each, the result went to deadlock and reverted to the earlier public vote. Both acts had the same public votes, so was decided that none of the acts would be eliminated.

==== Week 6 (16 February) ====
Acts' performances on the sixth live show
Act	Category (mentor)	Order	Song	Result
Ingrid Havalja	Mix (Zerka)	1	"Ancora"	Safe
Alis Kallaçi	Boys (Ara)	2	"Teeth"	Safe
Anisa Shabani	Girls (Dani)	3	"Show Me How You Burlesque"	Safe
Jetmir Kanani	Mix (Zerka)	4	"I've Been Loving You Too Long"	Safe
Kleansa Susaj	Girls (Dani)	5	"When Love Takes Over"	Safe
Alba Dajlani	Mix (Zerka)	6	"That Man"	Eliminated
Gent Disha	Boys (Ara)	7	"Halo"	Safe
Frank Ibrahimi	Mix (Zerka)	8	"Human"	Safe
Kejsi Jazxhi	Girls (Dani)	9	"Adagio"	Eliminated
Kevin Malo	Boys (Ara)	10	"Son of a Preacher Man"	Safe
Niki Zaimi	Boys (Ara)	11	"Whole Lotta Love"	Safe
The Chemicals	Groups (Dani)	12	"Everybody"	Safe
Wendy Zylaj	Girls (Dani)	13	"Bad Romance"	Safe

==== Week 7 (23 February) ====
Acts' performances on the seventh live show
Act	Category (mentor)	Order	Song	Result
Jetmir Kanani	Mix (Zerka)	1	"No Woman, No Cry"	Safe
Gent Disha	Boys (Ara)	2	"Refuzoj"	Bottom Two
Niki Zaimi	Boys (Ara)	3	"Are You Gonna Be My Girl"	Safe
Kleansa Susaj	Girls (Dani)	4	"Ajër"	Safe
The Chemicals	Groups (Dani)	5	"L'Italiano"	Safe
Frank Ibrahimi	Mix (Zerka)	6	"Fati ynë shpresë dhe marrëzi"	Safe
Anisa Shabani	Girls (Dani)	7	"Still Loving You"	Safe
Alis Kallaçi	Boys (Ara)	8	"Listen"	Safe
Wendy Zylaj	Girls (Dani)	9	"Total Eclipse of the Heart"	Safe
Kevin Malo	Boys (Ara)	10	"Can I Be Him"	Safe
Ingrid Havalja	Mix (Zerka)	11	"Raggamuffin"	Bottom Two
Sing-off details
Gent Disha	Boys (Ara)	1	"Refuzoj"	Eliminated
Ingrid Havalja	Mix (Zerka)	2	"Raggamuffin"	Saved

Judges' votes to eliminate

- Krasta: Gent Disha
- Ara: Ingrid Havalja
- Dani: Ingrid Havalja
- Zerka: Gent Disha

With the acts in the sing-off receiving two votes each, the result went to deadlock and reverted to the earlier public vote. Gent Disha was eliminated as the act with the fewest public votes.

==== Week 8 (1 March) ====
Acts' performances on the eighth live show
Act	Category (mentor)	Order	Song	Result
Ingrid Havalja	Mix (Zerka)	1	"Plas"	Safe
Frank Ibrahimi	Mix (Zerka)	2	"Sex on Fire"	Safe
Jetmir Kanani	Mix (Zerka)	3	"Lucille"	Safe
Kevin Malo	Boys (Ara)	4	"Iris"	Bottom Two
Alis Kallaçi	Boys (Ara)	5	"California Dreamin'"	Safe
Niki Zaimi	Boys (Ara)	6	"Pranë Finishit"	Safe
Kleansa Susaj	Girls (Dani)	7	"Je t'aime"	Safe
Wendy Zylaj	Girls (Dani)	8	"Vibe"	Bottom Two
Anisa Shabani	Girls (Dani)	9	"Love On Top"	Safe
The Chemicals	Groups (Dani)	10	"A chi mi dice"	Safe
Sing-off details
Kevin Malo	Boys (Ara)	1	"Iris"	Saved
Wendy Zylaj	Girls (Dani)	2	"Vibe"	Eliminated

Judges' votes to eliminate

- Krasta: Kevin Malo
- Ara: Wendy Zylaj
- Dani: Kevin Malo
- Zerka: Wendy Zylaj

With the acts in the sing-off receiving two votes each, the result went to deadlock and reverted to the earlier public vote. Wendy Zylaj was eliminated as the act with the fewest public votes.

==== Week 9 (8 March) ====
Special performance

- Alketa Vejsiu - "La notte"

Acts' performances on the ninth live show
Act	Category (mentor)	Order	Song	Result
The Chemicals	Groups (Dani)	1	"Lule Lule"	Safe
Ingrid Havalja	Mix (Zerka)	2	"Caruso"	Safe
Jetmir Kanani	Mix (Zerka)	3	"Writing's on the Wall"	Safe
Kleansa Susaj	Girls (Dani)	4	"Arabian Nights"	Safe
Alis Kallaçi	Boys (Ara)	5	"My Heart Will Go On"	Safe
Kevin Malo	Boys (Ara)	6	"Zotëria juaj"	Bottom Two
Anisa Shabani	Girls (Dani)	7	"I'm Every Woman"	Bottom Two
Frank Ibrahimi	Mix (Zerka)	8	"Zombie"	Safe
Niki Zaimi	Boys (Ara)	9	"Counting Stars"	Safe
Sing-off details
Kevin Malo	Boys (Ara)	1	"Zotëria juaj"	Eliminated
Anisa Shabani	Girls (Dani)	2	"I'm Every Woman"	Saved

Judges' votes to eliminate

- Krasta: Kevin Malo
- Ara: Anisa Shabani
- Dani: Kevin Malo
- Zerka: Kevin Malo

==== Week 10 (15 March) ====
Special performances

- Kamela Islamaj, Boys - "The Way You Make Me Feel"
- Young Zerka - Personal discography performance

Acts' performances on the tenth live show
Act	Category (mentor)	Order	Song	Result
Niki Zaimi	Boys (Ara)	1	"Burn"	Safe
Jetmir Kanani	Mix (Zerka)	2	"Make It Rain"	Safe
Ingrid Havalja	Mix (Zerka)	3	"I Will Always Love You"	Bottom Two
Frank Ibrahimi	Mix (Zerka)	4	"I Put a Spell on You"	Safe
Alis Kallaçi	Boys (Ara)	5	"Think"	Safe
Kleansa Susaj	Girls (Dani)	6	"Addicted to You"	Safe
The Chemicals	Groups (Dani)	7	"September"	Bottom Two
Anisa Shabani	Girls (Dani)	8	"It's All Coming Back to Me Now"	Safe
Sing-off details
Ingrid Havalja	Mix (Zerka)	1	"I Will Always Love You"	Eliminated
The Chemicals	Groups (Dani)	2	"September"	Saved

Judges' votes to eliminate

- Krasta: The Chemicals
- Ara: Ingrid Havalja
- Dani: Ingrid Havalja
- Zerka: The Chemicals

With the acts in the sing-off receiving two votes each, the result went to deadlock and reverted to the earlier public vote. Ingrid Havalja was eliminated as the act with the fewest public votes.

==== Week 11 (24 March) ====
Special performances

- Egzona Ademi, Mix - "The Show Must Go On"
- Arilena Ara - Personal discography performance

Acts' performances on the eleventh live show
Act	Category (mentor)	Order	Song	Result
Frank Ibrahimi	Mix (Zerka)	1	"Beggin'"	Bottom Two
Anisa Shabani	Girls (Dani)	2	"Bang Bang"	Safe
Jetmir Kanani	Mix (Zerka)	3	"Kiss"	Safe
Alis Kallaçi	Boys (Ara)	4	"Proud Mary"	Safe
Niki Zaimi	Boys (Ara)	5	"Highway to Hell"	Safe
The Chemicals	Groups (Dani)	6	"Bella Ciao"	Bottom Two
Kleansa Susaj	Girls (Dani)	7	"Alive"	Safe
Sing-off details
Frank Ibrahimi	Mix (Zerka)	1	"Beggin'"	Eliminated
The Chemicals	Groups (Dani)	2	"Bella Ciao"	Saved

Judges' votes to eliminate

- Krasta: Frank Ibrahimi
- Ara: Frank Ibrahimi
- Dani: Frank Ibrahimi
- Zerka: The Chemicals

==== Week 12 (29 March) ====
Special performances

- Landi Kademi, Girls, The Chemicals - "Na lini të jetojmë"
- Elhaida Dani - "Adagio"

Acts' performances on the twelfth live show
Act	Category (mentor)	Order	Song	Result
Jetmir Kanani	Mix (Zerka)	1	"I See Red"	Safe
Niki Zaimi	Boys (Ara)	2	"Black Dog" / "Rock and Roll"	Safe
Alis Kallaçi	Boys (Ara)	3	"I Want to Know What Love Is"	Safe
Anisa Shabani	Girls (Dani)	4	"The Phantom of the Opera"	Safe
The Chemicals	Groups (Dani)	5	"Kena lind për qef" / "Hou çike"	Safe
Kleansa Susaj	Girls (Dani)	6	"Never Enough"	Safe

==== Week 13 (5 April) ====
Acts' performances on the thirteenth live show
Act	Category (mentor)	Order	Song	Result
Jetmir Kanani	Mix (Zerka)	1	"Georgia on My Mind"	Safe
Alis Kallaçi	Boys (Ara)	2	"Bohemian Rhapsody"	Safe
Niki Zaimi	Boys (Ara)	3	"Grande amore"	Safe
Kleansa Susaj	Girls (Dani)	4	"If I Ain't Got You"	Safe
The Chemicals	Groups (Dani)	5	"Stand by Me"	Eliminated
Anisa Shabani	Girls (Dani)	6	"Hush Hush; Hush Hush"	Eliminated

==== Semi-Final (12 April) ====
Acts' performances on the semi-final
Act	Category (mentor)	Order	First song	Order	Second song	Duet partner	Result
Alis Kallaçi	Boys (Ara)	1	"And I Am Telling You I'm Not Going"	5	"Forever Young"	Capital T	Safe
Niki Zaimi	Boys (Ara)	2	"The Final Countdown"	7	"Livin' on a Prayer"	Eneda Tarifa	Eliminated
Kleansa Susaj	Girls (Dani)	3	"I Surrender"	6	"When You Believe"	Miriam Cani	Safe
Jetmir Kanani	Mix (Zerka)	4	"I Got You (I Feel Good)"	8	"It's a Man's Man's Man's World"	Manjola Nallbani	Safe

==== Final (19 April) ====
Special performances

- Finalists - "Feeling Good" / "Freedom" / "Crazy"
- Alketa Vejsiu - "Dance Again" / "On the Floor"
- Alban Skënderaj - "Pranvera"
- All acts, Alketa Vejsiu - Mashup

Acts' performances on the final
Act	Category (mentor)	Order	First song	Duet partner	Order	Second song	Result
Jetmir Kanani	Mix (Zerka)	1	"Love Nwantiti" / "They Don't Care About Us"	Young Zerka	4	"Creep"	Runner-Up
Kleansa Susaj	Girls (Dani)	2	"Voilà"	Elhaida Dani	N/A (Already Eliminated)		Third Place
Alis Kallaçi	Boys (Ara)	3	"Shallow"	Arilena Ara	5	"Stand Up"	Winner
