= X Factor (Albanian TV series) =

- Also known as: X Factor Albania
- Created by: Simon Cowell
- Presented by: Alketa Vejsiu
- Judges: Pandi Laço; Alban Skënderaj; Juliana Pasha; Vesa Luma; Altuna Sejdiu; Soni Malaj; Miriam Cani; Bleona Qereti; Adi Krasta; Arilena Ara; Elhaida Dani; Young Zerka
- Countries of origin: Albania; Kosovo
- Original language: Albanian
- No. of seasons: 6

Production
- Producers: Vera Grabocka; Alketa Vejsiu
- Production locations: Tirana, Albania
- Production companies: Fremantle Albania; Syco TV; TV Klan

Original release
- Network: TV Klan
- Release: 8 January 2012 – 1 June 2015
- Release: 8 December 2023 – present

Related
- The X Factor; X Factor Kids

X Factor is an Albanian television reality music competition, based on the original British series, and an addition to The X Factor, to find new singing talent. The show began airing on 8 January 2012 and was broadcast by TV Klan.

The judging panel for the most recent season consisted of Adi Krasta, Arilena Ara, Young Zerka and Soni Malaj. Other judges from previous seasons consisted of Pandi Laço, Alban Skënderaj, Juliana Pasha, Vesa Luma, Altuna Sejdiu, Miriam Cani, Bleona Qereti and Elhaida Dani. The show is hosted by Alketa Vejsiu. She applied to acquire the rights of the show along with Top Channel and TV Klan. Syco TV gave the rights to her, then she sold parts of the rights to TV Klan. After losing the rights of The X Factor, Top Channel acquired the rights of the talent show, The Voice.

The show ran for 4 seasons, with the last episode airing on 1 June 2015, and then TV Klan announced that there were no plans to air another series of the programme. On 6 June 2022, Alketa Vejsiu announced that after 7 years, the show would return, with his fifth season in 2023 on TV Klan. The fifth season began airing on 8 December 2023.

There have been six winners: Sheila Haxhiraj, Arilena Ara, Ergi Dini, Edea Demaliaj, Alis Kallaçi, and Rigersa Loka.

On 9 January 2025, was announced a new version with the name X Factor Kids, for children until the ages of 12. The show began airing on 7 November 2025 on TV Klan, with Alketa Vejsiu as the host.

== Overview ==
It was announced that there would be four categories on the show, Males 15 to 23, Females 15 to 23, over 23s and The Groups. Since the fifth season, are only three categories on the show, the Boys category, the Girls category and the Mix category.

Also it was announced that there would be five stages of the competition. The first stage is known as the "Producers audition", the producers of the show choose which of the contestants will have the right to audition in front of the judges. Next the contestants audition in front of the judges where they sing at least one song with instrumentals or A Capella. The third stage of the competition is Bootcamp, where from thousands of contestants only 150 are left. The fourth stage includes the "Judge's houses" or known in Albania as "Vilat e Jurive", where only 32 contestants,8 per category would fight for their place in the live shows. And the last stage of the competition would be the Live shows, where four contestants per category will make it.

In the first live show the public couldn't vote or make a decision. In the second live show and on, only the public had the right to vote and decide which contestants from all categories would end up in the bottom two. The two contestants with the lowest number of votes would end up in the bottom two, then they sing again for survival, the four judges would decide which contestant they want to eliminate. If one of the judges has his or her contestant on the bottom two, he or she usually decides to eliminate the other contestant in the bottom two, so the real decision is in the hands of the two or (if one judge has two of its contestants in the bottom two) three judges that don't have their own contestants in the bottom two. The show goes this way on the live shows every week one or two contestants are voted off, until the grand finale on June 10 when the winner is announced.

The auditions were held in different cities across Albania and Kosovo, the producers auditions included many cities but the auditions in front of the judges were held only in a few. The cities that auditions were held with the judges are Tirana, Vlora, Elbasan, Shkoder and the Kosovan capital Pristina. The first episode aired half of Tirana's auditions on January 8. Vesa Luma wasn't the judge on all of the city auditions, she was chosen as the fourth judge only after all of the city auditions ended. She judged on the Shkodra's audition also. It was reported that more than 7000 people auditioned for the show, which broke a record for the biggest number of auditions in any talent show across Albania, Kosovo and the Balkans.

On the official Facebook page of the X Factor, it was announced that the show would be first aired on January 8, 2012. It was reported that the winner of the show would be signed to the famous label Syco Music, which has signed the likes of Leona Lewis, One Direction, Susan Boyle, Little Mix, Cher Lloyd, Alexandra Burke, Westlife etc. The winner of the first season of X factor Albania was Sheila Haxhiraj.

== Judges and hosts ==
Cast	Seasons						
Cast	1	2	3	4	5	6	7
Host
Alketa Vejsiu	Main	Main	Main	Main	Main	Main	Main
Judging panelists
Alban Skënderaj	Main	Main	Main	Main			
Pandi Laço	Main	Main	Main	Main			
Juliana Pasha	Main						
Vesa Luma	Main				Guest		
Altuna Sejdiu		Main	Main				
Soni Malaj (Note: Elhaida Dani originally signed up to serve on the sixth season as judge full-time. However, Dani was not able to resume her duties for the live shows. Soni Malaj replaced her, and served as judge until the end of the season.)		Main	Main			Main	
Bleona Qereti				Main			
Miriam Cani				Main			
Adi Krasta					Main	Main	
Arilena Ara					Main	Main	
Young Zerka					Main	Main	
Elhaida Dani					Main	Main	
Bojken Lako						Guest	Main
Fifi							Main
Oriola Marashi							Main
Pirro Çako							Main

== Series summary ==
Teams color key
Act from Alban's Category	Act from Altuna's Category	Act from Arilena's Category
Act from Juliana's Category	Act from Bleona's Category	Act from Bojken's Category
Act from Vesa's Category	Act from Miriam's Category	Act from Fifi's Category
Act from Pandi's Category	Act from Zerka's Category	Act from Pirro's Category
Act from Soni's Category	Act from Elhaida's Category	Act from Oriola's Category

Season	Originally aired		Winner	Runner-up	Third place	Winning mentor	Presenter	Main judges (Seat order)			
Season	First aired	Last aired	Winner	Runner-up	Third place	Winning mentor	Presenter	1	2	3	4
1	8 January 2012	10 June 2012	Sheila Haxhiraj; Girls	Kristo Thano; Boys	Xhesika Polo; Girls	Juliana Pasha	Alketa Vejsiu	Alban Skënderaj	Juliana Pasha	Vesa Luma	Pandi Laço
2	28 October 2012	31 March 2013	Arilena Ara; Girls	Aldo Bardhi; Boys	Natyral; Groups	Altuna Sejdiu	Alketa Vejsiu	Alban Skënderaj	Soni Malaj	Altuna Sejdiu	Pandi Laço
3	15 September 2013	23 February 2014	Ergi Dini; Boys	Senad Rrahmani; Over 23s	Sarah Memmola; Over 23s	Altuna Sejdiu	Alketa Vejsiu	Alban Skënderaj	Soni Malaj	Altuna Sejdiu	Pandi Laço
4	5 January 2015	1 June 2015	Edea Demaliaj; Girls	Genti Deda; Boys	Dilan Reka; Boys	Miriam Cani	Alketa Vejsiu	Alban Skënderaj	Bleona Qereti	Miriam Cani	Pandi Laço
5	8 December 2023	19 April 2024	Alis Kallaçi; Boys	Jetmir Kanani; Mix	Kleansa Susaj; Girls	Arilena Ara	Alketa Vejsiu	Young Zerka	Elhaida Dani	Arilena Ara	Adi Krasta
6	8 November 2024	4 April 2025	Rigersa Loka; Girls	Salvatore Mete; Mix	Leandra Godaj; Girls	Arilena Ara	Alketa Vejsiu	Young Zerka	Soni Malaj	Arilena Ara	Adi Krasta
7	6 November 2026	April 2027	Current season				Alketa Vejsiu	Bojken Lako	Fifi	Pirro Çako	Oriola Marashi

== Judges' categories and their contestants ==
In each season, each judge is allocated a category to mentor and chooses four acts to progress to the live shows. This table shows, for each season, which category each judge was allocated and which acts he or she put through to the live shows.

Key:

– Winning judge/category. Winners are in bold, eliminated contestants in small font.

Season	Alban Skënderaj	Juliana Pasha	Vesa Luma	Pandi Laço
One	**Boys**; Kristo Thano; Anxhelo Miho; Amarildo Shahinaj; Arianit Bellopoja	**Girls**; **Sheila Haxhiraj**; Xhesika Polo; Festina Mejzini; Savjana Vjerdha	**Over 23s** Lirije Rashiti; Besa Breca; Gerald Zyfi; Matilda Shushari	**Groups**; Classic Boys; X Group; Focus; Red Roses
Two	Alban Skënderaj	Soni Malaj	Altuna Sejdiu	Pandi Laço
Two	**Groups**; Natyral; KSAL; Soul Sisters; Foxy Ladies	**Boys**; Aldo Bardhi; Sardi Strugaj; Petro Xhori; Herri Beluli	**Girls**; **Arilena Ara**; Antonela Çekixhi; Elisa Salla; Xhina Kelmendi; Shkelqesa Sadiku	**No Limit**; Kanita Suma; Egzona Ademi; Suela Malasi; Ina Torba; Rezart Saliasi
Three	**Over 23s** Senad Rrahmani; Sarah Memmola; Mia Morina; Fatmir Durmishi	**Groups**; Exception; Free Spirit; Nimfat; Dream Girls	**Boys**; **Ergi Dini**; Leotrim Zejnullahu; Amadeo Gjura; Ademir Fresku	**Girls**; Enxhi Nasufi; Laura Kërliu; Arissa Rexho; Kristina Leka
Four	Alban Skënderaj	Bleona Qereti	Miriam Cani	Pandi Laço
Four	**Over 23s** Manuel Moscati; Alice; Ylenia Iorio; Adela Curra	**Boys**; Genti Deda; Dilan Reka; Matteo Brento; Igli Zarka; Gerald Celibashi	**Girls**; **Edea Demaliaj**; Floriana Rexhepi; Lediana Matoshi; Mirela Boka	**Groups**; Brunetts; X Roads; Mama Pop; Double F
Five	Young Zerka	Elhaida Dani	Arilena Ara	—
Five	**Mix**; Jetmir Kanani; Frank Ibrahimi; Ingrid Havalja; Alba Dajlani; Borana Xhemali	**Girls**; Kleansa Susaj; Anisa Shabani; Wendy Zylaj; Kejsi Jazxhi; Luna Çausholli	**Boys**; **Alis Kallaçi**; Niki Zaimi; Kevin Malo; Gent Disha; Aldo Prendushi	—
Five	**Mix**; Jetmir Kanani; Frank Ibrahimi; Ingrid Havalja; Alba Dajlani; Borana Xhemali	**Groups**; The Chemicals	**Boys**; **Alis Kallaçi**; Niki Zaimi; Kevin Malo; Gent Disha; Aldo Prendushi	—
Six	Young Zerka	Soni Malaj	Arilena Ara	—
Six	**Mix**; Salvatore Mete; Orjald Debinja; Era Bako; Albi & Elvi Kapedani; Ergi Hasani	**Boys**; Petro Fejzo; Fortunato Cugilari; Valdrin Mustafa; Amarildo Vesho; Lorian Dedaj	**Girls**; **Rigersa Loka**; Leandra Godaj; Alda "Troy" Cuka; Vashat; Anja Myrtaj; Bletisa Karaj	—
