= X Factor Kids (Albanian TV series) =

- Genre: Reality competition
- Created by: Simon Cowell
- Written by: Gaetano Castelli
- Directed by: Vera Grabocka
- Presented by: Alketa Vejsiu
- Judges: Bojken Lako; Fifi; Oriola Marashi; Pirro Çako
- Countries of origin: Albania; Kosovo
- Original language: Albanian
- No. of seasons: 1
- No. of episodes: 20

Production
- Executive producers: Vera Grabocka; Alketa Vejsiu
- Producer: Aleksander Frangaj
- Production locations: Tirana, Albania
- Editor: Alketa Vejsiu
- Camera setup: multi-camera
- Running time: 120 minutes
- Production companies: TV Klan; Fremantle Media

Original release
- Network: TV Klan
- Release: 7 November 2025 – 3 April 2026

Related
- The X Factor; X Factor

X Factor Kids, also known as X Factor Kids Albania, is an Albanian television reality music competition for children under the ages of 12, based on the concept of the show X Factor Albania. The show began airing on 7 November 2025 on TV Klan. Alketa Vejsiu, who also has been hosting the original version, was announced as the host for the kids version. The judging panel was formed by Bojken Lako, Fifi, Oriola Marashi and Pirro Çako.

On 3 April 2026, Eden Dani from team Pirro Çako won the first season. This marked Çako's first win as a mentor.

== Format ==
The show features young singers aged up to 12 years from across Albania. The competition begins with open auditions, where children perform in front of a panel of judges and a live audience. Contestants needed three or more 'yeses' from the four judges to progress on the next round. A new feature of the show, called the "Superpower", allows a judge to save one contestant from elimination during the auditions. Successful participants advance to the Judges' Houses stage, where each judge mentors a group of contestants. The participants are divided into four categories: Girls, Boys, Juniors (older children within the eligible age range), and Kids (the youngest contestants). Each act performed one song to their mentor. After the performances, the judges revealed which acts they put through to the live shows.

At the end of this phase, four acts from each category move on to the Live Shows, forming a total of 16 finalists. The Live Shows are broadcast weekly on television. Contestants perform popular songs either solo or in groups, with results determined by SMS voting and judges' feedback. The final episode features the top three contestants, who compete for the title of X Factor Kids Albania winner. The winner typically receives opportunities such as a recording project or professional mentoring.

The show focuses on encouragement, creativity, and personal development rather than intense competition, aiming to help children gain confidence and stage experience.

== Judges and presenter ==
The show is hosted by Alketa Vejsiu, who also serves as one of the producers alongside Vera Grabocka.

During the audition phase, several well-known Albanian artists took part in the selection process, including Pirro Çako, Bojken Lako, Fifi, Oriola Marashi, Fatma Haxhialiu, Kamela Islamaj, Andi Vrapi, and Eneda Tarifa. From these eight personalities, only four will become the official judges for the season, although the final judging panel has not yet been officially announced.

During the Judges' Houses, it was announced that the four judges for the first season would be Bojken Lako, Fifi, Oriola Marashi and Pirro Çako. The judges are expected to mentor different categories of contestants throughout the competition, guiding them from the Judges' Houses stage to the live performances.

== Selection process ==
=== Open auditions ===
The format for the show was announced in January 2025 by TV Klan. The show began staging producers' audition on 21 January 2025 and on 9 February 2025 at the premises of TV Klan in Tirana.

=== Judges' auditions ===
The auditionees chosen by the producers were invited back to the last set of arena auditions that took place in front of the judges. These auditions began filming on 8 October 2025 and were held in Tirana. The three episodes began broadcast on TV Klan from 7 November 2025 until 21 November 2025. In the first episode, the judging panel included Andi Vrapi, Fatma Haxhialiu, Fifi, and Pirro Çako. The second episode featured Bojken Lako, Oriola Marashi, Kamela Islamaj, and Eneda Tarifa as judges. In the third episode, the panel consisted of Bojken Lako, Fifi, Oriola Marashi, and Pirro Çako.

During the auditions, the show features a special rule known as the "Superpower", allowing a judge to save one contestant who would otherwise be eliminated.

=== Judges' Houses ===
The final round of the selection process, the judges' houses were filmed in late October 2024. At the start of Judges' Houses, the judges discovered which categories they would mentor: Fifi was given the Boys, Pirro Çako was given the Juniors, Bojken Lako was given the Girls and Oriola Marashi was given the Kids. On the first two episodes of judges' houses, each act performed one song to their mentor and guest mentor. Fifi was assisted by DJ Dagz, Pirro Çako was assisted by Xhensila Myrtezaj, Bojken Lako was assisted by Stine and Oriola Marashi was assisted by Gent Myftaraj. After the performances, on the third episode the judges revealed which acts they put through to the live shows.

The three judges' houses episodes were broadcast on 28 November 2025, on 5 December 2025 and on 12 December 2025.

Episode	Category (mentor)	Order	Act	Song	Result
Episode 4 (28 November)	Boys (Fifi)	1	Marin Kerri	"Warrior"	Saved
Episode 4 (28 November)	Boys (Fifi)	2	Eden Loci	"Blinding Lights"	Eliminated
Episode 4 (28 November)	Boys (Fifi)	3	Alex Gjonaj	"Someone You Loved"	Saved
Episode 4 (28 November)	Boys (Fifi)	4	Ernest Gerbeshi	"Speechless"	Eliminated
Episode 4 (28 November)	Boys (Fifi)	5	Fjord Guri	"River"	Saved
Episode 4 (28 November)	Boys (Fifi)	6	Marlon Zela	"Still Loving You"	Saved
Episode 4 (28 November)	Boys (Fifi)	7	Amar Daci	"Ride"	Eliminated
Episode 4 (28 November)	Boys (Fifi)	8	Dorian Kurrila	"Grenade"	Eliminated
Episode 4 (28 November)	Juniors (Pirro)	9	Eden Dani	"When We Were Young"	Saved
Episode 4 (28 November)	Juniors (Pirro)	10	Klea Marku	"Bring Me to Life"	Saved
Episode 4 (28 November)	Juniors (Pirro)	11	Letisia Dyrma	"I Will Always Love You"	Eliminated
Episode 4 (28 November)	Juniors (Pirro)	12	Amla Demushi	"Once Upon a December"	Eliminated
Episode 4 (28 November)	Juniors (Pirro)	13	David Kerri	"It's a Man's Man's Man's World"	Saved
Episode 4 (28 November)	Juniors (Pirro)	14	Armina Kanjozi	"Nature Boy"	Eliminated
Episode 4 (28 November)	Juniors (Pirro)	15	Emili Dervishi	"My Way"	Eliminated
Episode 4 (28 November)	Juniors (Pirro)	16	Nikol Çabeli	"Hurt"	Saved
Episode 4 (28 November)	Juniors (Pirro)	17	Jasemin Çaku	"Listen"	Saved
Episode 5 (5 December)	Girls (Bojken)	1	Reana Bajrami	"Part of Your World"	Saved
Episode 5 (5 December)	Girls (Bojken)	2	Rose-May Dardha	"Always Remember Us This Way"	Saved
Episode 5 (5 December)	Girls (Bojken)	3	Rajna Hasani	"A Million Dreams"	Eliminated
Episode 5 (5 December)	Girls (Bojken)	4	Xhorxhia Kepi	"What About Us"	Eliminated
Episode 5 (5 December)	Girls (Bojken)	5	Aria Kolaveri	"Ne Shkoder te vish"	Saved
Episode 5 (5 December)	Girls (Bojken)	6	Noemi Pregjoni	"Elon"	Eliminated
Episode 5 (5 December)	Girls (Bojken)	7	Sejla Dudumi	"Drip"	Eliminated
Episode 5 (5 December)	Girls (Bojken)	8	Kejsi Sinani	"Arabian Nights"	Saved
Episode 5 (5 December)	Girls (Bojken)	9	Adora Laze	"Vampire"	Eliminated
Episode 5 (5 December)	Girls (Bojken)	10	Endi Piroli	"Hit the Road Jack"	Eliminated
Episode 5 (5 December)	Girls (Bojken)	11	Alisa Dashi	"Alive"	Eliminated
Episode 5 (5 December)	Girls (Bojken)	12	Amal Velaj	"Cruel Summer"	Saved
Episode 5 (5 December)	Kids (Oriola)	13	Ersa Doda	"Power"	Saved
Episode 5 (5 December)	Kids (Oriola)	14	Evelin Mukaj	"Man! I Feel Like a Woman!"	Saved
Episode 5 (5 December)	Kids (Oriola)	15	Aira Troka	"Die with a Smile"	Eliminated
Episode 5 (5 December)	Kids (Oriola)	16	Aksel Kalavace	"Zombie"	Eliminated
Episode 5 (5 December)	Kids (Oriola)	17	Enia Boshnjaku	"Evil Like Me"	Saved
Episode 5 (5 December)	Kids (Oriola)	18	Tea Hidri	"Money"	Eliminated
Episode 5 (5 December)	Kids (Oriola)	19	Noara Dervishi	"La Isla Bonita"	Eliminated
Episode 5 (5 December)	Kids (Oriola)	20	Aria Krasta	"How Far I'll Go"	Saved

== Acts ==
Key:

– Winner
– Runner-Up
– 3rd Place

Act	Category (mentor)	Live show of elimation	Result
Eden Dani	Juniors (Pirro)	Final	Winner
Kejsi Sinani	Girls (Bojken)	Final	Runner-up
Alex Gjonaj	Boys (Fifi)	Final	3rd Place
David Kerri	Juniors (Pirro)	Semi-Final	4th Place
Nikol Çabeli	Juniors (Pirro)	Live show 12	5th Place
Rose-May Dardha	Girls (Bojken)	Live show 11	6th Place
Klea Marku	Juniors (Pirro)	Live show 10	7th Place
Amal Velaj	Girls (Bojken)	Live show 9	8th Place
Marlon Zela	Boys (Fifi)	Live show 8	9th Place
Evelin Mukaj	Kids (Oriola)	Live show 7	10th Place
Marin Kerri	Boys (Fifi)	Live show 6	11th Place
Aria Krasta	Kids (Oriola)	Live show 5	12th Place
Ersa Doda	Kids (Oriola)	Live show 4	13th-14th Place
Reana Bajrami	Girls (Bojken)	Live show 4	13th-14th Place
Fjord Guri	Boys (Fifi)	Live show 3	15th-18th Place
Jasemin Çaku	Juniors (Pirro)	Live show 3	15th-18th Place
Aria Kolaveri	Girls (Bojken)	Live show 3	15th-18th Place
Enia Boshnjaku	Kids (Oriola)	Live show 3	15th-18th Place

== Live shows ==
The Live Shows began airing on 19 December 2025.

=== Results summary ===
Colour key

Act in team Fifi (Boys)

Act in team Pirro (Juniors)

Act in team Bojken (Girls)

Act in team Oriola (Kids)

Act was in the bottom two
Act was immediately eliminated
Act received the most public votes

Weekly results per act
Act	Week 1	Week 2	Week 3	Week 4	Week 5	Week 6	Week 7	Week 8	Week 9	Week 10	Week 11	Week 12	Week 13	Semi-Final	Final
Eden Dani	Safe	Safe	Safe	Safe	Safe	Safe	Safe	Safe	Safe	Safe	Bottom two	Bottom two	Safe	Safe	Winner (final)
Kejsi Sinani	Safe	Safe	Safe	Safe	Safe	Safe	Safe	Safe	Bottom two	Safe	Safe	Safe	Safe	Safe	Runner-Up (final)
Alex Gjonaj	Safe	Safe	Safe	Safe	Safe	Safe	Safe	Safe	Safe	Safe	Safe	Safe	Safe	Safe	Third place (final)
David Kerri	Safe	Safe	Safe	Safe	Safe	Bottom two	Safe	Bottom two	Safe	Bottom two	Safe	Safe	Safe	4th	Eliminated (Semi-Final)
Nikol Çabeli	Safe	Safe	Safe	Safe	Safe	Safe	Bottom two	Safe	Safe	Safe	Safe	Bottom two	Eliminated (week 12)		
Rose-May Dardha	Safe	Safe	Safe	Safe	Safe	Safe	Safe	Safe	Safe	Safe	Bottom two	Eliminated (week 11)			
Klea Marku	Safe	Safe	Safe	Safe	Safe	Safe	Safe	Safe	Safe	Bottom two	Eliminated (week 10)				
Amal Velaj	Safe	Safe	Safe	Safe	Safe	Safe	Safe	Safe	Bottom two	Eliminated (week 9)					
Marlon Zela	Safe	Safe	Safe	Safe	Safe	Safe	Safe	Bottom two	Eliminated (week 8)						
Evelin Mukaj	Safe	Safe	Safe	Safe	Safe	Safe	Bottom two	Eliminated (week 7)							
Marin Kerri	Safe	Safe	Safe	Safe	Bottom two	Bottom two	Eliminated (week 6)								
Aria Krasta	Safe	Safe	Safe	Safe	Bottom two	Eliminated (week 5)									
Ersa Doda	Safe	Safe	Safe	13th-14th	Eliminated (week 4)										
Reana Bajrami	Safe	Safe	Safe	13th-14th	Eliminated (week 4)										
Fjord Guri	Safe	Safe	15th-18th	Eliminated (week 3)											
Jasemin Çaku	Safe	Safe	15th-18th	Eliminated (week 3)											
Aria Kolaveri	Safe	Safe	15th-18th	Eliminated (week 3)											
Enia Boshnjaku	Safe	Safe	15th-18th	Eliminated (week 3)											
Final Showdown	None ^{1}		No sing-off or judges' votes: results were based on public votes alone		Aria Krasta, Marin Kerri	David Kerri, Marin Kerri	Evelin Mukaj, Nikol Çabeli	David Kerri, Marlon Zela	Amal Velaj, Kejsi Sinani	David Kerri, Klea Marku	Eden Dani, Rose-May Dardha	Eden Dani, Nikol Çabeli	None ^{1}	No sing-off or judges' votes: results were based on public votes alone	
Judges voted to	None ^{1}		No sing-off or judges' votes: results were based on public votes alone		Eliminate								None ^{1}	No sing-off or judges' votes: results were based on public votes alone	
Oriola's vote	None ^{1}		No sing-off or judges' votes: results were based on public votes alone		Marin Kerri	Marin Kerri	Nikol Çabeli	Marlon Zela	Amal Velaj	—N/a^{2}	Rose-May Dardha	Nikol Çabeli	None ^{1}	No sing-off or judges' votes: results were based on public votes alone	
Pirro's vote	None ^{1}		No sing-off or judges' votes: results were based on public votes alone		Aria Krasta	Marin Kerri	Evelin Mukaj	Marlon Zela	Amal Velaj	Klea Marku	Rose-May Dardha	Nikol Çabeli	None ^{1}	No sing-off or judges' votes: results were based on public votes alone	
Fifi's vote	None ^{1}		No sing-off or judges' votes: results were based on public votes alone		Aria Krasta	David Kerri	Evelin Mukaj	David Kerri	Kejsi Sinani	Klea Marku	Rose-May Dardha	Eden Dani	None ^{1}	No sing-off or judges' votes: results were based on public votes alone	
Bojken's vote	None ^{1}		No sing-off or judges' votes: results were based on public votes alone		Aria Krasta	Marin Kerri	Evelin Mukaj	Marlon Zela	Amal Velaj	Klea Marku	Eden Dani	Nikol Çabeli	None ^{1}	No sing-off or judges' votes: results were based on public votes alone	
Eliminated	None ^{1}		Fjord Guri; Public vote to save	Ersa Doda; Public vote to save	Aria Krasta; 3 of 4 votes Majority	Marin Kerri; 3 of 4 votes Majority	Evelin Mukaj; 3 of 4 votes Majority	Marlon Zela; 3 of 4 votes Majority	Amal Velaj; 3 of 4 votes Majority	Klea Marku; 3 of 3 votes Majority	Rose-May Dardha; 3 of 4 votes Majority	Nikol Çabeli; 3 of 4 votes Majority	None ^{1}	David Kerri; Public vote to save	Alex Gjonaj; Public vote to win
Eliminated	None ^{1}		Jasemin Çaku; Public vote to save	Ersa Doda; Public vote to save	Aria Krasta; 3 of 4 votes Majority	Marin Kerri; 3 of 4 votes Majority	Evelin Mukaj; 3 of 4 votes Majority	Marlon Zela; 3 of 4 votes Majority	Amal Velaj; 3 of 4 votes Majority	Klea Marku; 3 of 3 votes Majority	Rose-May Dardha; 3 of 4 votes Majority	Nikol Çabeli; 3 of 4 votes Majority	None ^{1}	David Kerri; Public vote to save	Alex Gjonaj; Public vote to win
Eliminated	None ^{1}		Aria Kolaveri; Public vote to save	Reana Bajrami; Public vote to save	Aria Krasta; 3 of 4 votes Majority	Marin Kerri; 3 of 4 votes Majority	Evelin Mukaj; 3 of 4 votes Majority	Marlon Zela; 3 of 4 votes Majority	Amal Velaj; 3 of 4 votes Majority	Klea Marku; 3 of 3 votes Majority	Rose-May Dardha; 3 of 4 votes Majority	Nikol Çabeli; 3 of 4 votes Majority	None ^{1}	David Kerri; Public vote to save	Kejsi Sinani; Public vote to win
Eliminated	None ^{1}		Enia Boshnjaku; Public vote to save	Reana Bajrami; Public vote to save	Aria Krasta; 3 of 4 votes Majority	Marin Kerri; 3 of 4 votes Majority	Evelin Mukaj; 3 of 4 votes Majority	Marlon Zela; 3 of 4 votes Majority	Amal Velaj; 3 of 4 votes Majority	Klea Marku; 3 of 3 votes Majority	Rose-May Dardha; 3 of 4 votes Majority	Nikol Çabeli; 3 of 4 votes Majority	None ^{1}	David Kerri; Public vote to save	Kejsi Sinani; Public vote to win

- ^1 In this live show, there was no elimination. Viewers could still vote, and the votes went on and were counted in the next live show, where the elimination took place.
- ^2 Oriola Marashi was not required to vote as there was already a majority.

=== Live show details ===
==== Week 1 (19 December) ====
Acts' performances on the first live show
Act	Category (mentor)	Order	Song	Result
Eden Dani	Juniors (Pirro)	1	"Take Me to Church"	Safe
Reana Bajrami	Girls (Bojken)	2	"One Night Only"	Safe
Aria Krasta	Kids (Oriola)	3	"Set It All Free"	Safe
David Kerri	Juniors (Pirro)	4	"Rise Like a Phoenix"	Safe
Aria Kolaveri	Girls (Bojken)	5	"Defying Gravity"	Safe
Kejsi Sinani	Girls (Bojken)	6	"Kënga Ime"	Safe
Marlon Zela	Boys (Fifi)	7	"The Final Countdown"	Safe
Klea Marku	Juniors (Pirro)	8	"I See Red"	Safe
Marin Kerri	Boys (Fifi)	9	"Billionaire"	Safe
Fjord Guri	Boys (Fifi)	10	"Writing's on the Wall"	Safe
Ersa Doda	Kids (Oriola)	11	"Wannabe"	Safe
Amal Velaj	Girls (Bojken)	12	"Voilà"	Safe
Enia Boshnjaku	Kids (Oriola)	13	"Je veux"	Safe
Rose-May Dardha	Girls (Bojken)	14	"Is It Love"	Safe
Evelin Mukaj	Kids (Oriola)	15	"Jeho"	Safe
Nikol Çabeli	Juniors (Pirro)	16	"Trouble with My Baby"	Safe
Alex Gjonaj	Boys (Fifi)	17	"Ready to Go"	Safe
Jasemin Çaku	Juniors (Pirro)	18	"Mamma Knows Best"	Safe

==== Week 2 (26 December) ====
Acts' performances on the second live show
Act	Category (mentor)	Order	Song	Result
Kejsi Sinani	Girls (Bojken)	1	"Underneath the Tree"	Safe
Rose-May Dardha	Girls (Bojken)	2	"Snowman"	Safe
Alex Gjonaj	Boys (Fifi)	3	"Shake Up Christmas"	Safe
Eden Dani	Juniors (Pirro)	4	"Ave Maria"	Safe
Aria Kolaveri	Girls (Bojken)	5	"Shqipëri o Vendi im"	Safe
Fjord Guri	Boys (Fifi)	6	"It's the Most Wonderful Time of the Year"	Safe
Klea Marku	Juniors (Pirro)	7	"I'll Be There"	Safe
Evelin Mukaj	Kids (Oriola)	8	"Rockin' Around the Christmas Tree"	Safe
Amal Velaj	Girls (Bojken)	9	"Santa's Coming for Us"	Safe
Enia Boshnjaku	Kids (Oriola)	10	"Let It Snow! Let It Snow! Let It Snow!"	Safe
Marlon Zela	Boys (Fifi)	11	"Last Christmas"	Safe
Nikol Çabeli	Juniors (Pirro)	12	"Santa Tell Me"	Safe
Ersa Doda	Kids (Oriola)	13	"Rrisim jetën tonë"	Safe
Marin Kerri	Boys (Fifi)	14	"Mistletoe"	Safe
Aria Krasta	Kids (Oriola)	15	"Ho Ho Ho"	Safe
Jasemin Çaku	Juniors (Pirro)	16	"Firework"	Safe
Reana Bajrami	Girls (Bojken)	17	"Santa, Can't You Hear Me"	Safe
David Kerri	Juniors (Pirro)	18	"You Deserve It All"	Safe

==== Week 3 (9 January) ====
Acts' performances on the third live show
Act	Category (mentor)	Order	Song	Result
Rose-May Dardha	Girls (Bojken)	1	"If I Ain't Got You"	Safe
Alex Gjonaj	Boys (Fifi)	2	"Hall of Fame"	Safe
Nikol Çabeli	Juniors (Pirro)	3	"Mercy"	Safe
Kejsi Sinani	Girls (Bojken)	4	"Who's Lovin' You"	Safe
Aria Kolaveri	Girls (Bojken)	5	"Fight Song"	Eliminated
Evelin Mukaj	Kids (Oriola)	6	"Mamma Mia"	Safe
Marlon Zela	Boys (Fifi)	7	"The Champion"	Safe
Klea Marku	Juniors (Pirro)	8	"Lose Control"	Safe
Amal Velaj	Girls (Bojken)	9	"Stronger (What Doesn't Kill You)"	Safe
Eden Dani	Juniors (Pirro)	10	"The Voice Within"	Safe
Reana Bajrami	Girls (Bojken)	11	"Hot Stuff"	Safe
Marin Kerri	Boys (Fifi)	12	"Attention"	Safe
Enia Boshnjaku	Kids (Oriola)	13	"C'est la vie"	Eliminated
Aria Krasta	Kids (Oriola)	14	"Cups"	Safe
Jasemin Çaku	Juniors (Pirro)	15	"Nate"	Eliminated
Ersa Doda	Kids (Oriola)	16	"Golden"	Safe
David Kerri	Juniors (Pirro)	17	"(You're the) Devil in Disguise"	Safe
Fjord Guri	Boys (Fifi)	18	"Dangerous"	Eliminated

==== Week 4 (16 January) ====
Acts' performances on the fourth live show
Act	Category (mentor)	Order	Song	Result
David Kerri	Juniors (Pirro)	1	"Zitti e buoni"	Safe
Eden Dani	Juniors (Pirro)	2	"What's Up?"	Safe
Aria Krasta	Kids (Oriola)	3	"Me Vete"	Safe
Klea Marku	Juniors (Pirro)	4	"Jo Tani"	Safe
Ersa Doda	Kids (Oriola)	5	"Girls Just Want to Have Fun"	Eliminated
Reana Bajrami	Girls (Bojken)	6	"Paranojak"	Eliminated
Alex Gjonaj	Boys (Fifi)	7	"Margaritar"	Safe
Rose-May Dardha	Girls (Bojken)	8	"Die on This Hill"	Safe
Kejsi Sinani	Girls (Bojken)	9	"Holding Out for a Hero"	Safe
Nikol Çabeli	Juniors (Pirro)	10	"Ce monde"	Safe
Marin Kerri	Boys (Fifi)	11	"Flashlight"	Safe
Marlon Zela	Boys (Fifi)	12	"Runaway"	Safe
Amal Velaj	Girls (Bojken)	13	"Try"	Safe
Evelin Mukaj	Kids (Oriola)	14	"Dance Monkey"	Safe

==== Week 5 (23 January) ====
Acts' performances on the fifth live show
Act	Category (mentor)	Order	Song	Result
Amal Velaj	Girls (Bojken)	1	"Emrin Tim"	Safe
Alex Gjonaj	Boys (Fifi)	2	"Stitches"	Safe
Nikol Çabeli	Juniors (Pirro)	3	"Vampire"	Safe
Eden Dani	Juniors (Pirro)	4	"Total Eclipse of the Heart"	Safe
Marlon Zela	Boys (Fifi)	5	"Fighter"	Safe
Evelin Mukaj	Kids (Oriola)	6	"It's All About You"	Safe
Kejsi Sinani	Girls (Bojken)	7	"I Surrender"	Safe
Klea Marku	Juniors (Pirro)	8	"Livin' on a Prayer"	Safe
Aria Krasta	Kids (Oriola)	9	"Who's Laughing Now"	Bottom Two
Marin Kerri	Boys (Fifi)	10	"Arcade"	Bottom Two
Rose-May Dardha	Girls (Bojken)	11	"Amanet"	Safe
David Kerri	Juniors (Pirro)	12	"Lithium"	Safe
Sing-off details
Aria Krasta	Kids (Oriola)	1	"Who's Laughing Now"	Eliminated
Marin Kerri	Boys (Fifi)	2	"Arcade"	Saved

Judges' votes to eliminate

- Oriola: Marin Kerri
- Pirro: Aria Krasta
- Fifi: Aria Krasta
- Bojken: Aria Krasta

==== Week 6 (30 January) ====
Acts' performances on the sixth live show
Act	Category (mentor)	Order	Song	Result
David Kerri	Juniors (Pirro)	1	"I Want to Break Free"	Bottom Two
Rose-May Dardha	Girls (Bojken)	2	"Grenade"	Safe
Alex Gjonaj	Boys (Fifi)	3	"My Songs Know What You Did in the Dark (Light Em Up)"	Safe
Eden Dani	Juniors (Pirro)	4	"Sweet Dreams"	Safe
Kejsi Sinani	Girls (Bojken)	5	"Nxënësja më e mirë"	Safe
Amal Velaj	Girls (Bojken)	6	"Abracadabra"	Safe
Nikol Çabeli	Juniors (Pirro)	7	"Girl on Fire"	Safe
Marlon Zela	Boys (Fifi)	8	"Beautiful Things"	Safe
Evelin Mukaj	Kids (Oriola)	9	"Let's Get Loud"	Safe
Marin Kerri	Boys (Fifi)	10	"Caruso"	Bottom Two
Klea Marku	Juniors (Pirro)	11	"It's All Coming Back to Me Now"	Safe
Sing-off details
David Kerri	Juniors (Pirro)	1	"I Want to Break Free"	Saved
Marin Kerri	Boys (Fifi)	2	"Caruso"	Eliminated

Judges' votes to eliminate

- Oriola: Marin Kerri
- Pirro: Marin Kerri
- Fifi: David Kerri
- Bojken: Marin Kerri

==== Week 7 (6 February) ====
Acts' performances on the seventh live show
Act	Category (mentor)	Order	Song	Result
Amal Velaj	Girls (Bojken)	1	"Zombie"	Safe
Rose-May Dardha	Girls (Bojken)	2	"Training Season"	Safe
Alex Gjonaj	Boys (Fifi)	3	"You Give Love a Bad Name"	Safe
Nikol Çabeli	Juniors (Pirro)	4	"Zero Gradë"	Bottom Two
Evelin Mukaj	Kids (Oriola)	5	"Mos ja prishni lumturinë"	Bottom Two
David Kerri	Juniors (Pirro)	6	"La notte"	Safe
Klea Marku	Juniors (Pirro)	7	"I Was Made for Lovin' You"	Safe
Marlon Zela	Boys (Fifi)	8	"Maska e madhështisë"	Safe
Kejsi Sinani	Girls (Bojken)	9	"Oscar Winning Tears"	Safe
Eden Dani	Juniors (Pirro)	10	"Purple Rain"	Safe
Sing-off details
Nikol Çabeli	Juniors (Pirro)	1	"Zero Gradë"	Saved
Evelin Mukaj	Kids (Oriola)	2	"Mos ja prishni lumturinë"	Eliminated

Judges' votes to eliminate

- Oriola: Nikol Çabeli
- Pirro: Evelin Mukaj
- Fifi: Evelin Mukaj
- Bojken: Evelin Mukaj

==== Week 8 (13 February) ====
Acts' performances on the eighth live show
Act	Category (mentor)	Order	Song	Result
Rose-May Dardha	Girls (Bojken)	1	"Elon"	Safe
Kejsi Sinani	Girls (Bojken)	2	"Never Enough"	Safe
Eden Dani	Juniors (Pirro)	3	"Ëndërr"	Safe
David Kerri	Juniors (Pirro)	4	"Impossible"	Bottom Two
Alex Gjonaj	Boys (Fifi)	5	"Another Love"	Safe
Klea Marku	Juniors (Pirro)	6	"Bohemian Rhapsody"	Safe
Amal Velaj	Girls (Bojken)	7	"Runaway Baby"	Safe
Marlon Zela	Boys (Fifi)	8	"Thunderstruck"	Bottom Two
Nikol Çabeli	Juniors (Pirro)	9	"Esperança"	Safe
Sing-off details
David Kerri	Juniors (Pirro)	1	"Impossible"	Saved
Marlon Zela	Boys (Fifi)	2	"Thunderstruck"	Eliminated

Judges' votes to eliminate

- Oriola: Marlon Zela
- Pirro: Marlon Zela
- Fifi: David Kerri
- Bojken: Marlon Zela

==== Week 9 (20 February) ====
Acts' performances on the ninth live show
Act	Category (mentor)	Order	Song	Result
Alex Gjonaj	Boys (Fifi)	1	"Angels"	Safe
Nikol Çabeli	Juniors (Pirro)	2	"River Deep – Mountain High"	Safe
Eden Dani	Juniors (Pirro)	3	"And I Am Telling You I'm Not Going"	Safe
Rose-May Dardha	Girls (Bojken)	4	"Marova"	Safe
David Kerri	Juniors (Pirro)	5	"Toxicity"	Safe
Kejsi Sinani	Girls (Bojken)	6	"Where Have You Been"	Bottom Two
Amal Velaj	Girls (Bojken)	7	"I'm Outta Love"	Bottom Two
Klea Marku	Juniors (Pirro)	8	"Dark Winter"	Safe
Sing-off details
Kejsi Sinani	Girls (Bojken)	1	"Where Have You Been"	Saved
Amal Velaj	Girls (Bojken)	2	"I'm Outta Love"	Eliminated

Judges' votes to eliminate

- Oriola: Amal Velaj
- Pirro: Amal Velaj
- Fifi: Kejsi Sinani
- Bojken: Amal Velaj

==== Week 10 (27 February) ====
Acts' performances on the tenth live show
Act	Category (mentor)	Order	Song	Result
Kejsi Sinani	Girls (Bojken)	1	"Adagio"	Safe
Nikol Çabeli	Juniors (Pirro)	2	"Creep"	Safe
Eden Dani	Juniors (Pirro)	3	"Pyes Lotin"	Safe
David Kerri	Juniors (Pirro)	4	"A chi mi dice"	Bottom Two
Alex Gjonaj	Boys (Fifi)	5	"Gangsta's Paradise"/"Human"	Safe
Klea Marku	Juniors (Pirro)	6	"Sweet Child o' Mine"	Bottom Two
Rose-May Dardha	Girls (Bojken)	7	"Chandelier"	Safe
Sing-off details
David Kerri	Juniors (Pirro)	1	"A chi mi dice"	Saved
Klea Marku	Juniors (Pirro)	2	"Sweet Child o' Mine"	Eliminated

Judges' votes to eliminate

- Oriola was not required to vote as there was already a majority.
- Pirro: Klea Marku
- Fifi: Klea Marku
- Bojken: Klea Marku

==== Week 11 (6 March) ====
Acts' performances on the eleventh live show
Act	Category (mentor)	Order	Song	Result
David Kerri	Juniors (Pirro)	1	"Ovunque sarai"	Safe
Eden Dani	Juniors (Pirro)	2	"Going Under"	Bottom Two
Alex Gjonaj	Boys (Fifi)	3	"Stay"	Safe
Kejsi Sinani	Girls (Bojken)	4	"The Ballad of Jane Doe"	Safe
Nikol Çabeli	Juniors (Pirro)	5	"Di Sole e d'azzurro"	Safe
Rose-May Dardha	Girls (Bojken)	6	"Man Down"	Bottom Two
Sing-off details
Eden Dani	Juniors (Pirro)	1	"Going Under"	Saved
Rose-May Dardha	Girls (Bojken)	2	"Man Down"	Eliminated

Judges' votes to eliminate

- Oriola: Rose-May Dardha
- Pirro: Rose-May Dardha
- Fifi: Rose-May Dardha
- Bojken: Eden Dani

==== Week 12 (13 March) ====
Acts' performances on the twelfth live show
Act	Category (mentor)	Order	Song	Result
David Kerri	Juniors (Pirro)	1	"Radioactive"/"Natural"	Safe
Nikol Çabeli	Juniors (Pirro)	2	"Beggin'"	Bottom Two
Kejsi Sinani	Girls (Bojken)	3	"Hape Veten"	Safe
Alex Gjonaj	Boys (Fifi)	4	"Billie Jean"	Safe
Eden Dani	Juniors (Pirro)	5	"Desert Rose"	Bottom Two
Sing-off details
Nikol Çabeli	Juniors (Pirro)	1	"Beggin'"	Eliminated
Eden Dani	Juniors (Pirro)	2	"Desert Rose"	Saved

Judges' votes to eliminate

- Oriola: Nikol Çabeli
- Pirro: Nikol Çabeli
- Fifi: Eden Dani
- Bojken: Nikol Çabeli

==== Week 13 (20 March) ====
Acts' performances on the thirteenth live show
Act	Category (mentor)	Order	Song	Result
Alex Gjonaj	Boys (Fifi)	1	"Numb"	Safe
David Kerri	Juniors (Pirro)	2	"The Sound of Silence"	Safe
Kejsi Sinani	Girls (Bojken)	3	"Hurt"	Safe
Eden Dani	Juniors (Pirro)	4	"Hurts"	Safe

==== Semi-Final (27 March) ====
Acts' performances on the semi-final
Act	Category (mentor)	Order	First song	Order	Second song	Duet partner	Result
David Kerri	Juniors (Pirro)	1	"My Way"	6	"Arriverà"	Anxhela Peristeri	Eliminated
Eden Dani	Juniors (Pirro)	2	"Skyfall"	5	"I Believe I Can Fly"/"Beautiful Things"	Elhaida Dani	Safe
Alex Gjonaj	Boys (Fifi)	3	"Uptown Funk"/"Can't Stop the Feeling!"	8	"Refuzoj"	Alban Skënderaj	Safe
Kejsi Sinani	Girls (Bojken)	4	"Shake It Out"	7	"One Moment in Time"	Mira Konçi	Safe

==== Final (3 April) ====
Acts' performances on the semi-final
Act	Category (mentor)	Order	First song	Order	Second song	Order	Third song	Duet partner	Result
Eden Dani	Juniors (Pirro)	1	"Born This Way"/"Heart Attack"/"Sorry Not Sorry"	4	"Enderr"	7	"Sekreti Im"	Pirro Çako	Winner
Alex Gjonaj	Boys (Fifi)	2	"Let's Get It Started"/"Cake by the Ocean"/"Tití Me Preguntó"	5	"Another Love"	8	"Lali"/"Te dua"	Fifi	Third Place
Kejsi Sinani	Girls (Bojken)	3	"When Love Takes Over"/"Where Is My Husband!"/"Run the World (Girls)"	6	"Kenga Ime"	9	"Malagueña Salerosa"	Bojken Lako	Runner-Up
