= X Factor (Albanian TV series) season 6 =

X Factor
- Season 6
- Presented by: Alketa Vejsiu
- Judges: Adi Krasta; Arilena Ara; Young Zerka; Elhaida Dani (judges' houses); Soni Malaj (live shows); Alberije Hadergjonaj (guest); Anxhela Peristeri (guest); Ardit Cuni (guest); Bojken Lako (guest); Eli Fara (guest); Ledina Çelo (guest); Ronela Hajati (guest); Zhani Ciko (guest)
- Winner: Rigersa Loka
- Winning mentor: Arilena Ara
- Runner-up: Salvatore Mete

Release
- Original network: TV Klan
- Original release: 8 November 2024 – 4 April 2025

Season chronology
- ← Previous; Season 5

The sixth season of the Albanian television music competition X Factor began airing on TV Klan on 8 November 2024. Alketa Vejsiu returned as the presenter. The judging panel remained the same as the previous season, with Adi Krasta, Arilena Ara and Young Zerka returning for their second season. Elhaida Dani, who was also on the previous season, originally signed up to serve for this season as judge full-time. However, Dani was not able to resume her duties for the live shows. Soni Malaj replaced her, and served as judge until the end of the season.

On 4 April 2025, Rigersa Loka from team Arilena Ara won the season. This marked Ara's second consecutive win as a mentor.

== Judges and presenters ==
In October 2024, it was announced that the judging panel would remain the same as the previous series. It was announced that Ledina Çelo would appear as a guest judge. Other guest judges, were Alberije Hadergjonaj, Anxhela Peristeri, Ardit Cuni, Bojken Lako, Eli Fara, Ronela Hajati and Zhani Ciko.

On 19 December 2024, the day before the first live show of the season, it was announced that Elhaida Dani would no longer be part of the judging panel. Soni Malaj was named as Dani's replacement later that same day.

== Selection process ==
=== Open auditions ===
The show began staging producers' audition days on 8 June 2024 across Albania, Kosovo and North Macedonia.

=== Judges' auditions ===
The auditionees chosen by the producers were invited back to the last set of arena auditions that took place in front of the judges. These auditions began filming on 8 October 2024 and were held in Tirana. The three episodes began broadcast on TV Klan from 8 November 2024 until 22 November 2024. On the first episode, Anxhela Peristeri, Ledina Çelo and Zhani Ciko were guest judges in place of Adi Krasta, Arilena Ara and Elhaida Dani. On the second episode, the four main judges were placed by Ardit Cuni, Bojken Lako, Eli Fara and Ronela Hajati, as guest judges. On the last episode, Alberije Hadergjonaj was guest judge in place of Dani.

=== Judges' Houses ===
The final round of the selection process, the judges' houses were filmed in late October 2024. At the start of Judges' Houses, the judges discovered which categories they would mentor: Elhaida Dani was given the Boys, Arilena Ara was given the Girls and Young Zerka was given the Mix. Like in the last season, Adi Krasta would not mentor a category. On the first episode of judges' houses, each act performed one song to their mentor and guest mentor. Instead of Elhaida Dani, who is abroad, her place has been taken by the duo Soni Malaj and Bojken Lako. However, the decisions about the competitors were made by Dani. Arilena Ara was assisted by Renis Gjoka and Young Zerka was assisted by Alandyn. After the performances, on the second episode the judges revealed which acts they put through to the live shows.

Arilena Ara and Elhaida Dani had 10 acts on their category and Young Zerka had 9 acts on his category, and had to choose 5 to take with them on to the live shows.

Five acts from the Girls category who did not pass the judges' houses (Albana Bajratari, Klarisa Lako, Klea Murati, Marjana Papa and Sibora Teqja), were assigned to be in a Group named Vashat, and were taken to the live shows under the mentorship of Arilena Ara.

The two judges' houses episodes were broadcast on 29 November 2024 and on 13 December 2024.

Summary of judges' houses
Judge	Category	Assistants	Acts Eliminated	Ref.
Arilena Ara	Girls	Renis Gjoka	Albana Bajratari; Klarisa Lako; Klea Murati; Marjana Papa; Sibora Teqja	
Elhaida Dani	Boys	Soni Malaj and Bojken Lako	Albion Pllumbi; Greldjan Nelaj; Marin Grabocka; Nigel Xherimeja; Serxho Toma	
Young Zerka	Mix	Alandyn	Anxhela Shanaj; Elisa Ungaro; Eni Guci; Ervisa Kunxhiu	

=== Vocal coaches ===
- Erinda Agolli - Boys (Malaj)
- Kamela Islamaj - Mix (Zerka)
- Landi Kademi - Girls (Ara)

== Acts ==
Key:

– Winner
– Runner-Up
– 3rd Place

Act	Age(s)	Hometown	Category (mentor)	Result
Rigersa Loka	—	Shkodër	Girls (Ara)	Winner
Salvatore Mete	33	Calabria, Italy	Mix (Zerka)	Runner-up
Leandra Godaj	18	Fier	Girls (Ara)	3rd Place
Petro Fejzo	20	Tirana	Boys (Malaj)	4th Place
Alda "Troy" Cuka	17	Tirana	Girls (Ara)	5th Place
Fortunato Cugilari	20	Calabria, Italy	Boys (Malaj)	6th Place
Vashat	—N/a	Various	Girls (Ara)	7th Place
Valdrin Mustafa	18	Tirana	Boys (Malaj)	8th Place
Anja Myrtaj	21	Tirana	Girls (Ara)	9th Place
Orjald Debinja	23	Lushnjë	Mix (Zerka)	10th Place
Era Bako	26	Durrës	Mix (Zerka)	11th Place
Bletisa Karaj	17	Elbasan	Girls (Ara)	12th Place
Albi & Elvi Kapedani	—N/a	Durrës	Mix (Zerka)	13th-14th Place
Amarildo Vesho	17	Pogradec	Boys (Malaj)	13th-14th Place
Ergi Hasani	25	Fier	Mix (Zerka)	15th-16th Place
Lorian Dedaj	19	Laç	Boys (Malaj)	15th-16th Place

Ages shown above correspond to the beginning of the competition.

== Live shows ==
The Live Shows began airing on 20 December 2024. There were 15 contestants (5 from each category) this year. Albana Bajratari, Klarisa Lako, Klea Murati, Marjana Papa and Sibora Teqja auditioned as soloists on the show. The latter five failed to progress in the "Girls" category. However, they were later brought back and put together to form a five-piece girl group, thus qualifying for the "Girls Group" category, under the mentorship of Arilena Ara.

=== Results summary ===
Colour key

Act in team Arilena Ara

Act in team Soni Malaj

Act in team Young Zerka

Act was in the bottom two and had to perform again in the sing-off
Act received the fewest public votes and was immediately eliminated (no sing-off)
Act received the most public votes

Weekly results per act
Act	Week 1	Week 2	Week 3	Week 4	Week 5	Week 6	Week 7	Week 8	Week 9	Week 10	Week 11	Week 12	Week 13	Semi-Final	Final	
Act	Week 1	Week 2	Week 3	Week 4	Week 5	Week 6	Week 7	Week 8	Week 9	Week 10	Week 11	Week 12	Week 13	Semi-Final	Round 1	Round 2
Rigersa Loka	Safe	Safe	Safe	Safe	Safe	Safe	Safe	Safe	Safe	Safe	Safe	Safe	Bottom two	Safe	Safe	Winner (final)
Salvatore Mete	Safe	Safe	Safe	Safe	Safe	Safe	Safe	Safe	Safe	Safe	Safe	Bottom two	Safe	Safe	Safe	Runner-Up (final)
Leandra Godaj	Safe	Safe	Safe	Safe	Safe	Safe	Safe	Safe	Safe	Safe	Safe	Safe	Safe	Safe	3rd	Eliminated (final)
Petro Fejzo	Safe	Safe	Safe	Safe	Safe	Safe	Safe	8th	Safe	7th	Safe	Safe	Safe	4th	Eliminated (semi-final)	
Alda "Troy" Cuka	Safe	Safe	Safe	Safe	Safe	Safe	Safe	Safe	Safe	Safe	Safe	Safe	Bottom two	Eliminated (week 13)		
Fortunato Cugilari	Safe	Safe	Safe	Safe	Safe	Safe	Safe	Safe	Safe	Safe	6th	Bottom two	Eliminated (week 12)			
Vashat	Safe	Safe	Safe	Safe	Safe	Bottom two	Safe	Safe	Safe	Safe	7th	Eliminated (week 11)				
Valdrin Mustafa	Safe	Safe	Safe	Safe	Safe	Safe	Safe	Safe	Safe	8th	Eliminated (week 10)					
Anja Myrtaj	Safe	Safe	Safe	Safe	11th	Safe	Bottom two	9th	Eliminated (week 8)							
Orjald Debinja	Safe	Safe	Safe	Safe	Safe	Safe	Bottom two	Eliminated (week 7)								
Era Bako	Safe	Safe	Safe	Safe	Safe	Bottom two	Eliminated (week 6)									
Bletisa Karaj	Safe	Safe	Safe	Safe	12th	Eliminated (week 5)										
Albi & Elvi Kapedani	Safe	Safe	Safe	13th-14th	Eliminated (week 4)											
Amarildo Vesho	Safe	Safe	Safe	13th-14th	Eliminated (week 4)											
Ergi Hasani	15th-16th	Eliminated (week 1)														
Lorian Dedaj	15th-16th	Eliminated (week 1)														
Final Showdown	No sing-off or judges' votes: results were based on public votes alone	None ^{1}		No sing-off or judges' votes: results were based on public votes alone	Myrtaj, Karaj	Bako, Vashat	Debinja, Myrtaj	Fejzo, Myrtaj	None ^{1}	Fejzo, Mustafa	Cugilari, Vashat	Cugilari, Mete	Cuka, Loka	No sing-off or judges' votes: results were based on public votes alone		
Judges voted to	No sing-off or judges' votes: results were based on public votes alone	None ^{1}		No sing-off or judges' votes: results were based on public votes alone	Eliminate				None ^{1}	Eliminate				No sing-off or judges' votes: results were based on public votes alone		
Zerka's vote	No sing-off or judges' votes: results were based on public votes alone	None ^{1}		No sing-off or judges' votes: results were based on public votes alone	Anja Myrtaj	Vashat	Anja Myrtaj	Anja Myrtaj	None ^{1}	Petro Fejzo	Vashat	Fortunato Cugilari	Alda "Troy" Cuka	No sing-off or judges' votes: results were based on public votes alone		
Malaj's vote	No sing-off or judges' votes: results were based on public votes alone	None ^{1}		No sing-off or judges' votes: results were based on public votes alone	Bletisa Karaj	Era Bako	Orjald Debinja	Anja Myrtaj	None ^{1}	Valdrin Mustafa	Vashat	Salvatore Mete	Rigersa Loka	No sing-off or judges' votes: results were based on public votes alone		
Ara's vote	No sing-off or judges' votes: results were based on public votes alone	None ^{1}		No sing-off or judges' votes: results were based on public votes alone	Anja Myrtaj	Era Bako	Orjald Debinja	Petro Fejzo	None ^{1}	Valdrin Mustafa	Fortunato Cugilari	Fortunato Cugilari	Alda "Troy" Cuka	No sing-off or judges' votes: results were based on public votes alone		
Krasta's vote	No sing-off or judges' votes: results were based on public votes alone	None ^{1}		No sing-off or judges' votes: results were based on public votes alone	Bletisa Karaj	Era Bako	Orjald Debinja	Petro Fejzo	None ^{1}	Petro Fejzo	Fortunato Cugilari	Fortunato Cugilari	Alda "Troy" Cuka	No sing-off or judges' votes: results were based on public votes alone		
Eliminated	Ergi Hasani; Public vote to save	None ^{1}		Albi & Elvi Kapedani; Public vote to save	Bletisa Karaj; 2 of 4 votes Deadlock	Era Bako; 3 of 4 votes Majority	Orjald Debinja; 3 of 4 votes Majority	Anja Myrtaj; 2 of 4 votes Deadlock	None ^{1}	Valdrin Mustafa; 2 of 4 votes Deadlock	Vashat; 2 of 4 votes Deadlock	Fortunato Cugilari; 3 of 4 votes Majority	Alda "Troy" Cuka; 3 of 4 votes Majority	Petro Fejzo; Public vote to save	Leandra Godaj; Public vote to win	Salvatore Mete; Public vote to win
Eliminated	Lorian Dedaj; Public vote to save	None ^{1}		Amarildo Vesho; Public vote to save	Bletisa Karaj; 2 of 4 votes Deadlock	Era Bako; 3 of 4 votes Majority	Orjald Debinja; 3 of 4 votes Majority	Anja Myrtaj; 2 of 4 votes Deadlock	None ^{1}	Valdrin Mustafa; 2 of 4 votes Deadlock	Vashat; 2 of 4 votes Deadlock	Fortunato Cugilari; 3 of 4 votes Majority	Alda "Troy" Cuka; 3 of 4 votes Majority	Petro Fejzo; Public vote to save	Leandra Godaj; Public vote to win	Salvatore Mete; Public vote to win

- ^1 In this live show, there was no elimination. Viewers could still vote, and the votes went on and were counted in the next live show, where the elimination took place.

=== Live show details ===
==== Week 1 (20 December) ====
Acts' performances on the first live show
Act	Category (mentor)	Order	Song	Result
Leandra Godaj	Girls (Ara)	1	"It's All Coming Back to Me Now"	Safe
Valdrin Mustafa	Boys (Malaj)	2	"Cull t'hutu"	Safe
Anja Myrtaj	Girls (Ara)	3	"Respect"	Safe
Petro Fejzo	Boys (Malaj)	4	"Uptown Funk"	Safe
Fortunato Cugilari	Boys (Malaj)	5	"Caruso"	Safe
Era Bako	Mix (Zerka)	6	"All I Could Do Was Cry"	Safe
Albi & Elvi Kapedani	Mix (Zerka)	7	"Stand by Me"	Safe
Lorian Dedaj	Boys (Malaj)	8	"Johnny B. Goode"	Eliminated
Bletisa Karaj	Girls (Ara)	9	"Lose Control"	Safe
Salvatore Mete	Mix (Zerka)	10	"Grande amore"	Safe
Rigersa Loka	Girls (Ara)	11	"I'll Never Love Again"	Safe
Amarildo Vesho	Boys (Malaj)	12	"Ta dish ti c'pesoi kjo zemer"	Safe
Orjald Debinja	Mix (Zerka)	13	"Bosh"	Safe
Alda "Troy" Cuka	Girls (Ara)	14	"Jakup Ferri"	Safe
Ergi Hasani	Mix (Zerka)	15	"Beautiful Things"	Eliminated
Vashat	Girls (Ara)	16	"Free Your Mind"	Safe

==== Week 2 (27 December) ====
Acts' performances on the second live show
Act	Category (mentor)	Order	Song	Result
Petro Fejzo	Boys (Malaj)	1	"Fjalët e qiririt"	Safe
Valdrin Mustafa	Boys (Malaj)	2	"I Got You (I Feel Good)"	Safe
Era Bako	Mix (Zerka)	3	"What's Love Got to Do with It"	Safe
Amarildo Vesho	Boys (Malaj)	4	"Sa e shite zemrën"	Safe
Fortunato Cugilari	Boys (Malaj)	5	"Sign of the Times"	Safe
Rigersa Loka	Girls (Ara)	6	"(You Make Me Feel Like) A Natural Woman"	Safe
Vashat	Girls (Ara)	7	"Bang Bang"	Safe
Leandra Godaj	Girls (Ara)	8	"Suus"	Safe
Albi & Elvi Kapedani	Mix (Zerka)	9	"She"	Safe
Bletisa Karaj	Girls (Ara)	10	"Listen"	Safe
Orjald Debinja	Mix (Zerka)	11	"Careless Whisper"	Safe
Anja Myrtaj	Girls (Ara)	12	"Wrecking Ball"	Safe
Salvatore Mete	Mix (Zerka)	13	"Bad Romance"	Safe
Alda "Troy" Cuka	Girls (Ara)	14	"Thunderstruck"	Safe

==== Week 3 (3 January) ====
Acts' performances on the third live show
Act	Category (mentor)	Order	Song	Result
Bletisa Karaj	Girls (Ara)	1	"Nata"	Safe
Petro Fejzo	Boys (Malaj)	2	"Highway to Hell"	Safe
Era Bako	Mix (Zerka)	3	"Vetë ke mbet"	Safe
Albi & Elvi Kapedani	Mix (Zerka)	4	"I'm a Believer"	Safe
Valdrin Mustafa	Boys (Malaj)	5	"Who's Lovin' You"	Safe
Amarildo Vesho	Boys (Malaj)	6	"Njerëz që takoj çdo ditë"	Safe
Anja Myrtaj	Girls (Ara)	7	"Desert rose"	Safe
Alda "Troy" Cuka	Girls (Ara)	8	"Alone"	Safe
Vashat	Girls (Ara)	9	"I'm in Love with a Monster"	Safe
Orjald Debinja	Mix (Zerka)	10	"Stayin' Alive"	Safe
Fortunato Cugilari	Boys (Malaj)	11	"Baila morena"	Safe
Leandra Godaj	Girls (Ara)	12	"I'm Every Woman"	Safe
Salvatore Mete	Mix (Zerka)	13	"Ancora, ancora, ancora"	Safe
Rigersa Loka	Girls (Ara)	14	"Hot Stuff"	Safe

==== Week 4 (10 January) ====
Acts' performances on the fourth live show
Act	Category (mentor)	Order	Song	Result
Alda "Troy" Cuka	Girls (Ara)	1	"Welcome to the Jungle"	Safe
Orjald Debinja	Mix (Zerka)	2	"Blurred Lines"	Safe
Era Bako	Mix (Zerka)	3	"Stay with Me"	Safe
Anja Myrtaj	Girls (Ara)	4	"Shaj"	Safe
Albi & Elvi Kapedani	Mix (Zerka)	5	"Achy Breaky Heart"	Eliminated
Fortunato Cugilari	Boys (Malaj)	6	"Zitti e buoni"	Safe
Rigersa Loka	Girls (Ara)	7	"Jealous"	Safe
Bletisa Karaj	Girls (Ara)	8	"Mamma Knows Best"	Safe
Valdrin Mustafa	Boys (Malaj)	9	"Thikat e mia"	Safe
Leandra Godaj	Girls (Ara)	10	"River Deep – Mountain High"	Safe
Salvatore Mete	Mix (Zerka)	11	"Karma"	Safe
Amarildo Vesho	Boys (Malaj)	12	"Asaj"	Eliminated
Petro Fejzo	Boys (Malaj)	13	"Adagio"	Safe
Vashat	Girls (Ara)	14	"Teeth"/"Give Me Everything"	Safe

==== Week 5 (17 January) ====
Acts' performances on the fifth live show
Act	Category (mentor)	Order	Song	Result
Orjald Debinja	Mix (Zerka)	1	"Love Again"	Safe
Leandra Godaj	Girls (Ara)	2	"Speechless"	Safe
Valdrin Mustafa	Boys (Malaj)	3	"Freedom"	Safe
Era Bako	Mix (Zerka)	4	"Toxic"	Safe
Rigersa Loka	Girls (Ara)	5	"Only Love Can Hurt Like This"	Safe
Fortunato Cugilari	Boys (Malaj)	6	"Pranvera"	Safe
Salvatore Mete	Mix (Zerka)	7	"Je t'aime"	Safe
Bletisa Karaj	Girls (Ara)	8	"Holding Out for a Hero"	Bottom Two
Alda "Troy" Cuka	Girls (Ara)	9	"The Show Must Go On"	Safe
Anja Myrtaj	Girls (Ara)	10	"Ain't No Other Man"	Bottom Two
Vashat	Girls (Ara)	11	"Wannabe"	Safe
Petro Fejzo	Boys (Malaj)	12	"Happy"	Safe
Sing-off details
Bletisa Karaj	Girls (Ara)	1	"Holding Out for a Hero"	Eliminated
Anja Myrtaj	Girls (Ara)	2	"Ain't No Other Man"	Saved

Judges' votes to eliminate

- Krasta: Bletisa Karaj
- Ara: Anja Myrtaj
- Malaj: Bletisa Karaj
- Zerka: Anja Myrtaj

With the acts in the sing-off receiving two votes each, the result went to deadlock and reverted to the earlier public vote. Bletisa Karaj was eliminated as the act with the fewest public votes.

==== Week 6 (24 January) ====
Special performances

- Shkodra Elektronike - "Zjerm"

Acts' performances on the sixth live show
Act	Category (mentor)	Order	Song	Result
Alda "Troy" Cuka	Girls (Ara)	1	"The Final Countdown"	Safe
Anja Myrtaj	Girls (Ara)	2	"Faith"	Safe
Rigersa Loka	Girls (Ara)	3	"Piece of My Heart"	Safe
Fortunato Cugilari	Boys (Malaj)	4	"Questo piccolo grande amore"	Safe
Era Bako	Mix (Zerka)	5	"I Love Rock 'n' Roll"	Bottom Two
Leandra Godaj	Girls (Ara)	6	"All by Myself"	Safe
Salvatore Mete	Mix (Zerka)	7	"Ti sento"	Safe
Valdrin Mustafa	Boys (Malaj)	8	"Purple Rain"	Safe
Orjald Debinja	Mix (Zerka)	9	"Calling You"	Safe
Vashat	Girls (Ara)	10	"Single Ladies (Put a Ring on It)"	Bottom Two
Petro Fejzo	Boys (Malaj)	11	"Radioactive"	Safe
Sing-off details
Era Bako	Mix (Zerka)	1	"I Love Rock 'n' Roll"	Eliminated
Vashat	Girls (Ara)	2	"Single Ladies (Put a Ring on It)"	Saved

Judges' votes to eliminate

- Krasta: Era Bako
- Ara: Era Bako
- Malaj: Era Bako
- Zerka: Vashat

==== Week 7 (31 January) ====
Special performances

- Kamela Islamaj, Mix - "N'pasqyrë" / "Viva la Vida"

Acts' performances on the seventh live show
Act	Category (mentor)	Order	Song	Result
Rigersa Loka	Girls (Ara)	1	"Tattoo"	Safe
Salvatore Mete	Mix (Zerka)	2	"When the Party's Over"	Safe
Anja Myrtaj	Girls (Ara)	3	"Without You"	Bottom Two
Alda "Troy" Cuka	Girls (Ara)	4	"Mall"	Safe
Orjald Debinja	Mix (Zerka)	5	"Maniac"	Bottom Two
Petro Fejzo	Boys (Malaj)	6	"Rise Like a Phoenix"	Safe
Valdrin Mustafa	Boys (Malaj)	7	"Delilah"	Safe
Leandra Godaj	Girls (Ara)	8	"No More Tears (Enough Is Enough)"	Safe
Vashat	Girls (Ara)	9	"Gimme! Gimme! Gimme! (A Man After Midnight)"	Safe
Fortunato Cugilari	Boys (Malaj)	10	"A Sky Full of Stars"	Safe
Sing-off details
Anja Myrtaj	Girls (Ara)	1	"Without You"	Saved
Orjald Debinja	Mix (Zerka)	2	"Maniac"	Eliminated

Judges' votes to eliminate

- Krasta: Orjald Debinja
- Ara: Orjald Debinja
- Malaj: Orjald Debinja
- Zerka: Anja Myrtaj

==== Week 8 (7 February) ====
Special performances

- Erinda Agolli, Boys - "The Phantom of the Opera"

Acts' performances on the eighth live show
Act	Category (mentor)	Order	Song	Result
Alda "Troy" Cuka	Girls (Ara)	1	"Survivor"	Safe
Salvatore Mete	Mix (Zerka)	2	"Strong Enough"	Safe
Valdrin Mustafa	Boys (Malaj)	3	"Mon amour"	Safe
Rigersa Loka	Girls (Ara)	4	"Oscar Winning Tears"	Safe
Leandra Godaj	Girls (Ara)	5	"I'm Your Baby Tonight"	Safe
Petro Fejzo	Boys (Malaj)	6	"I Have Nothing"	Bottom Two
Anja Myrtaj	Girls (Ara)	7	"Stand Up"	Bottom Two
Fortunato Cugilari	Boys (Malaj)	8	"You Are the Reason"	Safe
Vashat	Girls (Ara)	9	"Show Me How You Burlesque"	Safe
Sing-off details
Petro Fejzo	Boys (Malaj)	1	"I Have Nothing"	Saved
Anja Myrtaj	Girls (Ara)	2	"Stand Up"	Eliminated

Judges' votes to eliminate

- Krasta: Petro Fejzo
- Ara: Petro Fejzo
- Malaj: Anja Myrtaj
- Zerka: Anja Myrtaj

With the acts in the sing-off receiving two votes each, the result went to deadlock and reverted to the earlier public vote. Anja Myrtaj was eliminated as the act with the fewest public votes.

==== Week 9 (14 February) ====
Acts' performances on the ninth live show
Act	Category (mentor)	Order	Song	Result
Rigersa Loka	Girls (Ara)	1	"Vampire"	Safe
Salvatore Mete	Mix (Zerka)	2	"Too Sweet"	Safe
Petro Fejzo	Boys (Malaj)	3	"Abracadabra"	Safe
Alda "Troy" Cuka	Girls (Ara)	4	"Good Luck, Babe!"	Safe
Valdrin Mustafa	Boys (Malaj)	5	"Golden Hour"	Safe
Leandra Godaj	Girls (Ara)	6	"Cruel Summer"	Safe
Fortunato Cugilari	Boys (Malaj)	7	"As It Was"	Safe
Vashat	Girls (Ara)	8	"Apt."	Safe

==== Week 10 (21 February) ====
Special performances

- Landi Kademi, Girls - "Believer" / "Crazy in Love" / "Jemi emri i vete jetes"

Acts' performances on the tenth live show
Act	Category (mentor)	Order	Song	Result
Rigersa Loka	Girls (Ara)	1	"Think"	Safe
Salvatore Mete	Mix (Zerka)	2	"Gli uomini non cambiano"	Safe
Alda "Troy" Cuka	Girls (Ara)	3	"My Songs Know What You Did in the Dark (Light Em Up)"	Safe
Vashat	Girls (Ara)	4	"We Found Love"	Safe
Fortunato Cugilari	Boys (Malaj)	5	"A Chi Mi Dice"	Safe
Leandra Godaj	Girls (Ara)	6	"Je suis malade"	Safe
Valdrin Mustafa	Boys (Malaj)	7	"Nobody's Perfect"	Bottom Two
Petro Fejzo	Boys (Malaj)	8	"I Was Here"	Bottom Two
Sing-off details
Valdrin Mustafa	Boys (Malaj)	1	"Nobody's Perfect"	Eliminated
Petro Fejzo	Boys (Malaj)	2	"I Was Here"	Saved

Judges' votes to eliminate

- Krasta: Petro Fejzo
- Ara: Valdrin Mustafa
- Malaj: Valdrin Mustafa
- Zerka: Petro Fejzo

With the acts in the sing-off receiving two votes each, the result went to deadlock and reverted to the earlier public vote. Valdrin Mustafa was eliminated as the act with the fewest public votes.

==== Week 11 (28 February) ====
Special performances

- Soni Malaj - "Pa Lamtumire"

Acts' performances on the eleventh live show
Act	Category (mentor)	Order	Song	Result
Petro Fejzo	Boys (Malaj)	1	"Beat It"	Safe
Leandra Godaj	Girls (Ara)	2	"Rise Up"	Safe
Vashat	Girls (Ara)	3	"Problem" / "Worth It"	Bottom Two
Alda "Troy" Cuka	Girls (Ara)	4	"You Shook Me All Night Long"	Safe
Fortunato Cugilari	Boys (Malaj)	5	"Amandoti"	Bottom Two
Rigersa Loka	Girls (Ara)	6	"And I Am Telling You I'm Not Going"	Safe
Salvatore Mete	Mix (Zerka)	7	"Addicted to You"	Safe
Sing-off details
Vashat	Girls (Ara)	1	"Problem" / "Worth It"	Eliminated
Fortunato Cugilari	Boys (Malaj)	2	"Amandoti"	Saved

Judges' votes to eliminate

- Krasta: Fortunato Cugilari
- Ara: Fortunato Cugilari
- Malaj: Vashat
- Zerka: Vashat

With the acts in the sing-off receiving two votes each, the result went to deadlock and reverted to the earlier public vote. Vashat was eliminated as the act with the fewest public votes.

==== Week 12 (7 March) ====
Acts' performances on the twelfth live show
Act	Category (mentor)	Order	Song	Result
Rigersa Loka	Girls (Ara)	1	"My Heart Will Go On"	Safe
Petro Fejzo	Boys (Malaj)	2	"When a Man Loves a Woman"	Safe
Alda "Troy" Cuka	Girls (Ara)	3	"You're Nobody till Somebody Loves You"	Safe
Leandra Godaj	Girls (Ara)	4	"Earth Song"	Safe
Fortunato Cugilari	Boys (Malaj)	5	"Always"	Bottom Two
Salvatore Mete	Mix (Zerka)	6	"Still Loving You"	Bottom Two
Sing-off details
Fortunato Cugilari	Boys (Malaj)	1	"Always"	Eliminated
Salvatore Mete	Mix (Zerka)	2	"Still Loving You"	Saved

Judges' votes to eliminate

- Krasta: Fortunato Cugilari
- Ara: Fortunato Cugilari
- Malaj: Salvatore Mete
- Zerka: Fortunato Cugilari

==== Week 13 (14 March) ====
Special performances

- Young Zerka - "Love" / "Boom Boom" / "Nona"
- Top 5 acts - "Mora fjalë" / "Tren për Prizren" / "Baresha" / "Xhamadani Vija Vija"

Acts' performances on the thirteenth live show
Act	Category (mentor)	Order	Song	Result
Salvatore Mete	Mix (Zerka)	1	"I Put a Spell on You"	Safe
Alda "Troy" Cuka	Girls (Ara)	2	"Jump"	Bottom Two
Rigersa Loka	Girls (Ara)	3	"Billie Jean"	Bottom Two
Petro Fejzo	Boys (Malaj)	4	"La notte"	Safe
Leandra Godaj	Girls (Ara)	5	"I See You"	Safe
Sing-off details
Alda "Troy" Cuka	Girls (Ara)	1	"Jump"	Eliminated
Rigersa Loka	Girls (Ara)	2	"Billie Jean"	Saved

Judges' votes to eliminate

- Krasta: Alda "Troy" Cuka
- Ara: Alda "Troy" Cuka
- Malaj: Rigersa Loka
- Zerka: Alda "Troy" Cuka

==== Semi-Final (28 March) ====
Acts' performances on the semi-final
Act	Category (mentor)	Order	First song	Order	Second song	Duet partner	Result
Rigersa Loka	Girls (Ara)	1	"If I Were a Boy"	5	"Bileta"	Tuna	Safe
Petro Fejzo	Boys (Malaj)	2	"Prane Finishit"	6	"Something's Got a Hold on Me"	Albina Kelmendi	Eliminated
Salvatore Mete	Mix (Zerka)	3	"Fai rumore"	8	"Die with a Smile"	Fifi	Safe
Leandra Godaj	Girls (Ara)	4	"Bound to You"	7	"Diferenca je ti"	Pirro Çako	Safe

==== Final (4 April) ====
Special performances

- Tuna & Nora Istrefi - "My Love"
- Soni Malaj & Young Zerka - "Per Vete Me Mbaj"
- Adi Krasta & Eranda Libohova - "Sant'Allegria"
- Arilena Ara - "Zero Gradë"
- All acts & Vocal coaches - Mashup

Acts' performances on the final
Act	Category (mentor)	Order	First song	Order	Second song	Duet partner	Order	Third song	Result
Leandra Godaj	Girls (Ara)	1	"They Don't Care About Us" / "Focus"	4	"Skyfall"	Arilena Ara	N/A (Already Eliminated)		Third Place
Salvatore Mete	Mix (Zerka)	2	"Nessuno mi può giudicare" / "Moves like Jagger"	6	"No Diggity"	Young Zerka	8	"Ancora, ancora, ancora"	Runner-Up
Rigersa Loka	Girls (Ara)	3	"Run the World (Girls)" / "End of Time"	5	"Do What U Want"	Arilena Ara	7	"Oscar Winning Tears"	Winner
