= X Factor (Albanian TV series) season 1 =

X Factor
- Season 1
- Hosted by: Alketa Vejsiu
- Judges: Pandi Laço; Vesa Luma; Juliana Pasha; Alban Skënderaj
- Winner: Sheila Haxhiraj
- Runner-up: Kristo Thano

Release
- Original network: Klan Television
- Original release: 8 January – 10 June 2012

Season chronology
- Next → Season 2

The first season of the Albanian TV series X Factor began on 8 January 2012 on TV Klan.

Based on the British format, the competition consists of auditions, in front of producers and then the judges with a live audience; bootcamp; judges' houses and then the live finals. Auditions for the show began in September and concluded in October 2011. The show is hosted by Albanian singer Alketa Vejsiu, while the judging panel consists of the biggest Albanian artists. Albanian famous writer, composer and TV presenter Pandi Laço, Albanian Kosovar pop singer Vesa Luma, Albania's representative at the 2010 Eurovision Song Contest Juliana Pasha and the Albanian superstar Alban Skënderaj. The winner of the first season of X factor Albania was Sheila Haxhiraj.

== Judges ==
The X Factor's host television Klan invited over 10 Albanian artists to be a part of The X Factor judging panel. It was rumored that Albanian singer Aurela Gaçe will be a judge/mentor. But, after giving birth to her first child, Aurela posted in Facebook that she will be staying with her family the whole month. Until the show started, the judges were not confirmed. In Vlorë auditions, Besa Kokëdhima was a "Guest-judge" even though, she was rumored to be a part of the judging panel. While the current judge, Vesa Luma to an interview, she told that she was only a guest in X Factor first, but later she was asked to be a part of it. Later that month, Vesa did not continue the contract with Digitalb, where she was signed. In Summer of 2011, Vesa was entertaining Albanian public on "E Diell" in Top Channel, a part of Digitalb platform. After not continuing the contract with Digitalb, she accepted the offer to be a judge on X Factor. Vesa is an Albanian singer from Kosovo, she is known for her hit song, "Jemi dhe S'jemi", which hit the charts in Balkan. In 2006 that song was awarded as the Best Song in Kosovo for 2006 in Videofest.

Albanian singer Juliana Pasha, was on the cover of Eurovision magazines, that she will be a guest judge. Later that week, she was officially asked to be a permanent mentor. Juliana represented Albania in the 2010 Eurovision Song Contest in Oslo, Norway. She got through to the final, finishing 16th.

While Pandi Laço was in every audition around Albania, after TV Klan released the news, he was officially a judge. Pandi is an Albanian writer, composer and previously a TV presenter. He is four-time winner in Festivali i Këngës for his songs. He wrote three Albanian Eurovision songs, Tomorrow I Go by Ledina Çelo, Hear My Plea by Frederik Ndoci and Zemrën e lamë peng by Olta Boka. Since a couple of years, Pandi has started his own show in TV Klan, about Albanian culture in film.

The biggest superstar in Albania Alban Skënderaj, was rumored to be a judge, since the beginning of the show. His fiancé Miriam Cani, Albanian-German singer, who is currently a judge in The Voice of Albania, to an interview told that it has been difficult to be away in two major shows in Albania. Skënderaj it is one of the most followed Albanian singers. He's songs "Let Me Die With You", "Vetëm ti" and many more, were hits in Albania in previous years.

== Selection process ==
Cities where X Factor auditions were held

=== Auditions ===
Audition process was based on the British and American version. First up were "The Producer's Audition", where the producers chose singers to proceed to the second phase which was "The Audition before the Judging panel". The Auditions took place in the biggest centers of Albania, including Kosovo's capital Pristina. The producer's auditions started in September 2011, while the Auditions before the judging panel started in October. The Producer's auditions took place in over 10 cities of Albania, including Pogradec, Durrës and Korçë.

The first city to start the auditions was Vlora in 11 and 12 October 2011. It was announced that there was over 3,000 applicants, where 800 got to perform. The auditions were held in the city's Palace of Sports. From the southern capital of Albania, judges traveled to the northern capital of Albania, Shkodër. The auditions in Shkodra took place in 17 and 18 October 2011. The auditions took place in the "Migjeni" theatre. In 25 and 26 October, judges moved to Albania's center city Elbasan. The auditions took place in the city's Palace of Sports.

After that, the judges left Albania and went to Pristina. The auditions took place in "Palace of Youth Complex" in Amphitheater Studios on 29 October. From the producer's auditions, there were 10 qualifiers.

The last city to hold the auditions was Albania's capital and biggest city Tirana. The auditions took place in Klan Television Studios from 1–4 November 2011.

=== Bootcamp ===
The Bootcamp phase was broadcast on 12 February. There were 150 contestants in Bootcamp from each category. In the first day, the producers of the show decided to test the participants on dancing, by telling them that the only way to proceed in the Judges' houses would be by dancing. But, after the time passed on midnight, the producers told the participants it was just a joke. However, after each contestant performed once and by group performing, the judges advanced 32 participants for the judges houses.

=== Judges' houses ===
Two days after the phase of Bootcamp was over, the producers of X Factor, telephoned each judge to communicate the category they would coach. Alban Skënderaj took the Boys category, Vesa Luma took the Over 23s, Juliana Pasha got the Girls category while Pandi Laço got the Groups category. The judges traveled to several cities of Albania, while Juliana Pasha traveled to Venice, Italy. Pandi Laço, who got the Groups Category, chose only 7 acts in Bootcamp, making thirty one participants in Judges' houses. The results were shown in the second week of the Judge's houses where 16 acts proceeded to the live shows.

The 15 eliminated acts were:

- Boys: Dritan Maraj, Gentian Deda, Leotrim Zejnullahu, Rezart Saliasi
- Girls: Antonela Çekixhi, Flaka Salihaj, Maria Prifti, Sigi Bastri
- Over 23s: Anxhela Dusha, Doriana Bircaj, Edmond Themeli, Florian Kollaj
- Groups: Different Girls, New Born, X Angels

== Contestants ==
The top 16 contestants were confirmed as follows;

Key:

– Winner
– Runner up

Category (mentor)	Acts			
Boys (Skënderaj)	Amarildo Shahinaj	Anxhelo Miho	Arianit Bellopoja	Kristo Thano
Girls (Pasha)	Festina Mejzini	Savjana Vjerdha	Sheila Haxhiraj	Xhesika Polo
Over 23s (Luma)	Besa Breca	Gerald Zyfi	Lirije Rashiti	Matilda Shushari
Groups (Laço)	Classic Boys	Focus	Red Roses	X Group

== Live shows ==
After four phases of selection and audition, X Factor arrived to the Live Shows. Sixteen acts proceeded to this round, four from each category. The first live show began on 3 March.

=== Results summary ===
Color key

–	Contestant was in the bottom two/three and had to sing again in the final showdown
–	Contestant received the fewest public votes and was immediately eliminated (no final showdown)
–	Contestant received the most public votes

Weekly results per contestant
Contestant	Week 1	Week 2	Week 3	Week 4	Week 5	Week 6	Week 7	Week 8	Week 9	Week 10	Week 11	Week 12	Week 13	Week 14	Week 15	
Contestant	Week 1	Week 2	Week 3	Week 4	Week 5	Week 6	Week 7	Week 8	Week 9	Week 10	Week 11	Week 12	Week 13	Week 14	Round One	Round Two
Sheila Haxhiraj	Safe	Safe	Safe	Safe	Safe	Safe	Safe	Safe	Safe	Safe	Safe	Bottom two	Safe	Safe	Safe	Winner
Kristo Thano	Safe	Safe	Safe	Safe	Bottom two	Safe	Safe	Safe	Safe	Safe	Safe	Safe	Safe	Safe	Safe	Runner-Up
Xhesika Polo	Safe	Safe	Safe	Safe	Safe	Safe	Bottom two	Safe	Bottom two	Safe	Safe	Safe	Safe	3rd	3rd	Eliminated (week 15)
Classic Boys	Safe	Safe	Safe	Safe	Safe	Safe	Safe	Safe	Safe	Safe	Safe	Safe	4th	4th	Eliminated (week 14)	
Festina Mejzini	Safe	Safe	Safe	Safe	Safe	Safe	Safe	Safe	Safe	Safe	Bottom two	Safe	5th	Eliminated (week 13)		
Lirije Rashiti	Safe	Safe	Safe	Safe	Safe	Safe	Safe	Safe	Safe	Safe	Safe	Bottom two	Eliminated (week 12)			
X Group	Safe	Safe	14th	Safe	Safe	Safe	Safe	Safe	Safe	Bottom two	Bottom two	Eliminated (week 11)				
Anxhelo Miho	Safe	Safe	Safe	Safe	Safe	Safe	Safe	9th	Safe	Bottom two	Eliminated (week 10)					
Savjana Vjerdha	Safe	Safe	Safe	Bottom two	Safe	Safe	Safe	Safe	Bottom two	Eliminated (week 9)						
Amarildo Shahinaj	Safe	Safe	Safe	Safe	Safe	Bottom two	Safe	10th	Eliminated (week 8)							
Focus	Safe	Safe	Safe	Safe	Safe	Safe	Bottom two	Eliminated (week 7)								
Besa Breca	Safe	Safe	Safe	Safe	Safe	Bottom two	Eliminated (week 6)									
Gerald Zyfi	Safe	Safe	Safe	Safe	Bottom two	Eliminated (week 5)										
Matilda Shushari	Safe	Safe	Safe	Bottom two	Eliminated (week 4)											
Arianit Bellopoja	Safe	Bottom two	15th	Eliminated (week 3)												
Red Roses	Safe	Bottom two	Eliminated (week 2)													
Final showdown	—N/a	Arianit Bellopoja; Red Roses	Arianit Bellopoja; X Group	Matilda Shushari; Savjana Vjerdha	Gerald Zyfi; Kristo Thano	Amarildo Shahinaj; Besa Breca	Focus; Xhesika Polo	Amarildo Shahinaj; Anxhelo Miho	Savjana Vjerdha; Xhesika Polo	Anxhelo Miho; X Group	Festina Mejzini; X Group	Lirije Rashiti; Sheila Haxhiraj	Classic Boys; Festina Mejzini	Classic Boys; Xhesika Polo	No final showdown or judges' vote: results are based on public votes alone	
Judges voted to:	Eliminate														No final showdown or judges' vote: results are based on public votes alone	
Skënderaj's vote	—N/a	Red Roses	X Group	Matilda Shushari	Gerald Zyfi	Besa Breca	Focus	Anxhelo Miho	Savjana Vjerdha	X Group	X Group	Lirije Rashiti	Classic Boys	Xhesika Polo	No final showdown or judges' vote: results are based on public votes alone	
Pasha's vote	—N/a	Red Roses	X Group	Matilda Shushari	Gerald Zyfi	Besa Breca	Focus	Amarildo Shahinaj	Savjana Vjerdha	Anxhelo Miho	X Group	Lirije Rashiti	Classic Boys	Classic Boys	No final showdown or judges' vote: results are based on public votes alone	
Luma's vote	—N/a	Red Roses	Arianit Bellopoja	Savjana Vjerdha	Kristo Thano	Amarildo Shahinaj	Focus	Anxhelo Miho	Xhesika Polo	Anxhelo Miho	X Group	Sheila Haxhiraj	Festina Mejzini	Classic Boys	No final showdown or judges' vote: results are based on public votes alone	
Laço's vote	—N/a	Arianit Bellopoja	Arianit Bellopoja	Matilda Shushari	Gerald Zyfi	Besa Breca	Xhesika Polo	Amarildo Shahinaj	Savjana Vjerdha	Anxhelo Miho	Festina Mejzini	Lirije Rashiti	Festina Mejzini	Xhesika Polo	No final showdown or judges' vote: results are based on public votes alone	
Eliminated	None	Red Roses; 3 of 4 votes Majority	Arianit Bellopoja; 2 of 4 votes Deadlock	Matilda Shushari; 3 of 4 votes Majority	Gerald Zyfi; 3 of 4 votes Majority	Besa Breca; 3 of 4 votes Majority	Focus; 3 of 4 votes Majority	Amarildo Shahinaj; 2 of 4 votes Deadlock	Savjana Vjerdha; 3 of 4 votes Majority	Anxhelo Miho; 3 of 4 votes Majority	X Group; 3 of 4 votes Majority	Lirije Rashiti; 3 of 4 votes Majority	Festina Mejzini; 2 of 4 votes Deadlock	Classic Boys; 2 of 4 votes Deadlock	Xhesika Polo; Third Place	Kritso Thano; Runner-Up
Eliminated	None	Red Roses; 3 of 4 votes Majority	Arianit Bellopoja; 2 of 4 votes Deadlock	Matilda Shushari; 3 of 4 votes Majority	Gerald Zyfi; 3 of 4 votes Majority	Besa Breca; 3 of 4 votes Majority	Focus; 3 of 4 votes Majority	Amarildo Shahinaj; 2 of 4 votes Deadlock	Savjana Vjerdha; 3 of 4 votes Majority	Anxhelo Miho; 3 of 4 votes Majority	X Group; 3 of 4 votes Majority	Lirije Rashiti; 3 of 4 votes Majority	Festina Mejzini; 2 of 4 votes Deadlock	Classic Boys; 2 of 4 votes Deadlock	Xhesika Polo; Third Place	Sheila Haxhiraj; Winner

=== Live show details ===
==== Week 1 (4 March 2012) ====
The first live show was held on 4 March in Klan Studios in Tirana. For the first time, X Factor debuted a high definition format in TV Klan; the show was broadcast entirely in 1080i HD. After sixteen artists performed, the host of the show, Alketa Vejsiu, communicated to the public that the X Factor Albania producers, in collaboration with the producers of The X Factor, decided to eliminate none of the performers.

Contestants' performances on the first live show
Act	Order	Song	Result
Classic Boys	1	"New York, New York"	Safe
Anxhelo Miho	2	"Bad Day"	Safe
Gerald Zyfi	3	"Baby One More Time"	Safe
Festina Mejzini	4	"Just the Way You Are"	Safe
Saviana Vjerdha	5	"When You Believe"	Safe
Amarildo Shahinaj	6	"Incomplete"	Safe
Red Roses	7	"I'm So Excited"	Safe
Matilda Shushari	8	"Hush Hush"	Safe
Arianit Bellopoja	9	"Jar of Hearts"	Safe
X Group	10	"You Raise Me Up"	Safe
Xhesika Polo	11	"Sober"	Safe
Lirije Rashiti	12	"At Last"	Safe
Besa Breca	13	"I Surrender"	Safe
Focus	14	"Don't Let Go (Love)"	Safe
Sheila Haxhiraj	15	"Firework"	Safe
Kristo Thano	16	"You Can Leave Your Hat On"	Safe
No Final Showdown

==== Week 2 (11 March 2012) ====
Contestants' performances on the second live show
Act	Order	Song	Result
Focus	1	"Fallin'"	Safe
Kristo Thano	2	"Are You Gonna Be My Girl"	Safe
Besa Breca	3	"Because of You"	Safe
Sheila Haxhiraj	4	"Sweet Dreams"	Safe
Anxhelo Miho	5	"Fairytale Gone Bad"	Safe
Gerald Zyfi	6	"Save the Last Dance for Me"	Safe
Matilda Shushari	7	"Earth Song"	Safe
Red Roses	8	"Candyman"	Bottom two
Savjana Vjerdha	9	"Holding Out for a Hero"	Safe
Arianit Bellopoja	10	"Stand by Me"	Bottom two
X Group	11	"I Swear"	Safe
Xhesika Polo	12	"Man in the Mirror"	Safe
Lirije Rashiti	13	"It's Impossible"	Safe
Amarildo Shahinaj	14	"Sex on Fire"	Safe
Festina Mejzini	15	"She Said"	Safe
Classic Boys	16	"Mama"	Safe
Final showdown details
Arianit Bellopoja	1	"Run"	Safe
Red Roses	2	"Lady Marmalade"	Eliminated

Judge's vote to eliminate

- Skënderaj: Red Roses
- Laço: Arianit Bellopoja
- Pasha: Red Roses
- Luma: Red Roses

==== Week 3 (18 March 2012) ====
Contestants' performances on the third live show
Act	Order	Song	Result
Savjana Vjerdha	1	"I'm Alive"	Safe
Amarildo Shahinaj	2	"Set Fire to the Rain"	Safe
Sheila Haxhiraj	3	"If I Ain't Got You"	Safe
Focus	4	"Stayin Alive"	Safe
Matilda Shushari	5	"Stop!"	Safe
Arianit Bellopoja	6	"Use Somebody"	Bottom two
Lirije Rashiti	7	"Rehab"	Safe
Anxhelo Miho	8	"Angels"	Safe
Classic Boys	9	"Hallelujah"	Safe
Gerald Zyfi	10	"Laura non c'è"	Safe
Festina Mejzini	11	"Killing Me Softly with His Song"	Safe
Kristo Thano	12	"Beggin'"	Safe
X Group	13	"I Want It That Way"	Bottom two
Xhesika Polo	14	"Someone like You"	Safe
Besa Breca	15	"River Deep-Mountain High"	Safe
Final showdown details
Arianit Bellopoja	1	"Let It Be"	Eliminated
X Group	2	"What a Wonderful World"	Safe

Judge's vote to eliminate

- Laço: Arianit Bellopoja
- Skënderaj: X Group
- Pasha: X Group
- Luma: Arianit Bellopoja

==== Week 4 (25 March 2012) ====
Contestants' performances on the fourth live show
Act	Order	Song	Result
Sheila Haxhiraj	1	"We Found Love"	Safe
Anxhelo Miho	2	"Cryin'"	Safe
X Group	3	"Part-Time Lover"	Safe
Lirije Rashiti	4	"I've Got to See You Again"	Safe
Matilda Shushari	5	"Can't Fight the Moonlight"	Bottom two
Amarildo Shahinaj	6	"It Will Rain"	Safe
Festina Mejzini	7	"Stereo Hearts"	Safe
Gerald Zyfi	8	"Supergirl"	Safe
Savjana Vjerdha	9	"The Boy Does Nothing"	Bottom two
Classic Boys	10	"Those Were the Days"	Safe
Kristo Thano	11	"Wicked Game"	Safe
Besa Breca	12	"Call Me When You're Sober"	Safe
Focus	13	"Chain of Fools"	Safe
Xhesika Polo	14	"Born This Way"	Safe
Final showdown details
Matilda Shushari	1	"A Moment Like This"	Eliminated
Savjana Vjerdha	2	"You Lost Me"	Safe

Judge's vote to eliminate

- Skënderaj: Matilda Shushari
- Pasha: Matilda Shushari
- Luma: Savjana Vjerdha
- Laço: Matilda Shushari

==== Week 5 (1 April 2012) ====
Contestants' performances on the fifth live show
Act	Order	Song	Result
Classic Boys	1	"Delilah"	Safe
Xhesika Polo	2	"Cry Baby"	Safe
Gerald Zyfi	3	"Lemon Tree"	Bottom two
Kristo Thano	4	"I Got You (I Feel Good)"	Bottom two
X Group	5	"Sorry Seems to Be the Hardest Word"	Safe
Amarildo Shahinaj	6	"In the Shadows"	Safe
Besa Breca	7	"Empire State of Mind (Part II) Broken Down"	Safe
Savjana Vjerdha	8	"Call Me"	Safe
Anxhelo Miho	9	"Love the Way You Lie (Part II)"	Safe
Festina Mejzini	10	"I Want to Break Free"	Safe
Lirije Rashiti	11	"What's a Woman?"	Safe
Focus	12	"Lose My Breath"	Safe
Sheila Haxhiraj	13	"Apologize"	Safe
Final showdown details
Gerald Zyfi	1	"Wonderful Life"	Eliminated
Kristo Thano	2	"Kryptonite"	Safe

Judge's vote to eliminate

- Skënderaj: Gerald Zyfi
- Luma: Kristo Thano
- Pasha: Gerald Zyfi
- Laço: Gerald Zyfi

==== Week 6 (8 April 2012) ====
Contestants' performances on the sixth live show
Act	Order	Song	Result
Xhesika Polo	1	"What's Up?"	Safe
Anxhelo Miho	2	"Always"	Safe
X Group	3	"Here Without You"	Safe
Besa Breca	4	"My Immortal"	Bottom two
Festina Mejzini	5	"This Love"	Safe
Amarildo Shahinaj	6	"Grenade"	Bottom two
Focus	7	"Hot Stuff"	Safe
Sheila Haxhiraj	8	"Crazy in Love"	Safe
Classic Boys	9	"My Way"	Safe
Lirije Rashiti	10	"Born Free"	Safe
Kristo Thano	11	"Stay"	Safe
Savjana Vjerdha	12	"Something's Got a Hold on Me"	Safe
Final showdown details
Besa Breca	1	"Just Walk Away"	Eliminated
Amarildo Shahinaj	2	"Bright Lights"	Safe

Judge's vote to eliminate

- Luma: Amarildo Shahinaj
- Skënderaj: Besa Breca
- Pasha: Besa Breca
- Laço: Besa Breca

==== Week 7 (15 April 2012) ====
Contestants' performances on the seventh live show
Act	Order	Song	Result
Kristo Thano	1	"Siamo Soli"	Safe
Savjana Vjerdha	2	"Je t'aime"	Safe
Xhesika Polo	3	"Jetoj"	Bottom two
X Group	4	"Can You Feel The Love Tonight"	Safe
Focus	5	"Eye of the Tiger"	Bottom two
Amarildo Shahinaj	6	"Who I Am"	Safe
Sheila Haxhiraj	7	"(You Make Me Feel Like) A Natural Woman"	Safe
Anxhelo Miho	8	"Kiss"	Safe
Classic Boys	9	"Per Ty Atdhe"	Safe
Festina Mejzini	10	"Zemrën e lamë peng"	Safe
Lirije Rashiti	11	"Diamonds Are a Girl's Best Friend"	Safe
Final showdown details
Xhesika Polo	1	"It Hurt So Bad"	Safe
Focus	2	"If I Were a Boy"	Eliminated

Judge's vote to eliminate

- Pasha: Focus
- Laço: Xhesika Polo
- Luma: Focus
- Skënderaj: Focus

==== Week 8 (22 April 2012) ====
Contestants' performances on the eighth live show
Act	Order	Song	Result
Anxhelo Miho	1	"What I've Done"	Bottom two
Savjana Vjerdha	2	"Hurt"	Safe
X Group	3	"Valerie"	Safe
Kristo Thano	4	"Breathe Easy"	Safe
Lirije Rashiti	5	"Nah Neh Nah"	Safe
Amarildo Shahinaj	6	"What About Now"	Bottom two
Sheila Haxhiraj	7	"Nobody's Perfect"	Safe
Xhesika Polo	8	"Family Portrait"	Safe
Classic Boys	9	"Lo Ti Amo"	Safe
Festina Mejzini	10	"Could You Be Loved"	Safe
Final showdown details
Anxhelo Miho	1	"Feel"	Safe
Amarildo Shahinaj	2	"Rolling in the Deep"	Eliminated

Judge's vote to eliminate

- Pasha: Amarildo Shahinaj
- Luma: Anxhelo Miho
- Laço: Amarildo Shahinaj
- Skënderaj: Anxhelo Miho

==== Week 9 (29 April 2012) ====
Contestants' performances on the ninth live show
Act	Order	Song	Result
Savjana Vjerdha	1	"Think"	Bottom two
Classic Boys	2	"Caruso"	Safe
Anxhelo Miho	3	"The Lazy Song"	Safe
Festina Mejzini	4	"I Need a Dollar"	Safe
Sheila Haxhiraj	5	"Feeling Good"	Safe
Kristo Thano	6	"Everybody Talks"	Safe
Lirije Rashiti	7	"Fever"	Safe
Xhesika Polo	8	"Crazy"	Bottom two
X Group	9	"Never Let You Go"	Safe
Final showdown details
Savjana Vjerdha	1	"Help!"	Eliminated
Xhesika Polo	2	"It's a Man's Man's Man's World"	Safe

Judge's vote to eliminate

- Pasha: Savjana Vjerdha
- Skënderaj: Savjana Vjerdha
- Luma: Xhesika Polo
- Laço: Savjana Vjerdha

==== Week 10 (6 May 2012) ====
Contestants' performances on the tenth live show
Act	Order	Song	Result
Festina Mejzini	1	"You Know I'm No Good"	Safe
Anxhelo Miho	2	"I Don't Want to Miss a Thing"	Bottom two
Xhesika Polo	3	"Dimmi come..."	Safe
X Group	4	"Home"	Bottom two
Lirije Rashiti	5	"A Song for You"	Safe
Sheila Haxhiraj	6	"A Woman's Worth"	Safe
Kristo Thano	7	"You Give Love a Bad Name"	Safe
Classic Boys	8	"Tu Vuò Fà L'Americano"	Safe
Final showdown details
Anxhelo Miho	1	"Keep the Faith"	Eliminated
X Group	2	""	Safe

Judge's vote to eliminate

- Skënderaj: X Group
- Laço: Anxhelo Miho
- Luma: Anxhelo Miho
- Pasha: Anxhelo Miho

==== Week 11 (13 May 2012) ====
Contestants' performances on the eleventh live show
Act	Order	Song	Result
Classic Boys	1	"Per colpa di chi"	Safe
Xhesika Polo	2	"GoldenEye"	Safe
Sheila Haxhiraj	3	"Ain't No Other Man"	Safe
X Group	4	"Careless Whisper"	Bottom two
Festina Mejzini	5	"Walking on Sunshine"	Bottom two
Kristo Thano	6	"Let Me Entertain You"	Safe
Lirije Rashiti	7	"All That Jazz"	Safe
Final showdown details
Festina Mejzini	1	"Turning Tables"	Safe
X Group	2	""	Eliminated

Judge's vote to eliminate

- Pasha: X Group
- Laço: Festina Mejzini
- Luma: X Group
- Skënderaj: X Group

==== Week 12 (20 May 2012) ====
Contestants' performances on the twelfth live show
Act	Order	Song	Result
Kristo Thano	1	"I'm a Believer"	Safe
Xhesika Polo	2	"Shine"	Safe
Lirije Rashiti	3	"Beat It"	Bottom two
Festina Mejzini	4	"Back It Up"	Safe
Classic Boys	5	"Cielito Lindo"	Safe
Sheila Haxhiraj	6	"Dance with Me"	Bottom two
Final showdown details
Sheila Haxhiraj	1	"I'd Rather Go Blind"	Safe
Lirije Rashiti	2	"Killing Me Softly with His Song"	Eliminated

Judge's vote to eliminate

- Pasha: Lirije Rashiti
- Luma: Sheila Haxhiraj
- Laço: Lirije Rashiti
- Skënderaj: Lirije Rashiti
