= Oriola Marashi =

Albanian model and vocalist (born 1996)

- Born: 18 March 1996 (age 30); Tirana, Albania
- Other name: Fatalna
- Education: Academy of Music, Tirana
- Occupations: influencer; model; vocalist
- Modeling information
- Height: 5 ft 11 in (180 cm)
- Hair color: Brown
- Eye color: Brown

Oriola Marashi (born 18 March 1996), is an Albanian model and vocalist.

== Career ==
Marashi got her breakout role at a young age. She is described by Telegrafi as being "one of Albania's most attractive women".

Marashi has modeled for American clothing brand Guess regularly since 2019, and has worked closely with American designer Paul Marciano. In a 2023 photoshoot with the brand, she appeared alongside Matteo Bocelli.. She has also worked with Givenchy, Dolce & Gabbana and has been a cover model for Vogue in the past.

Marashi had previously appeared as a video vixen in the music video for Jonas Blue's song "Mama".

Since 2025, she returned to music as a Pop and Reggaeton artist, alongside her work with Guess, releasing songs such as “Papi Calma”, “Uje” (with Fifi) and “Lema Lema”. She also famously judged The Kids’ series of X Factor launched in her home country

== Personal life ==
Marashi is from Tirana. She has a sister who is also a model.

She has been in relationships with Albanian football player, Eros Grezda and Big Brother Albania winner, Anaid Kaloti.
