= Vesa Luma =

Kosovo-Albanian singer (born 1986)

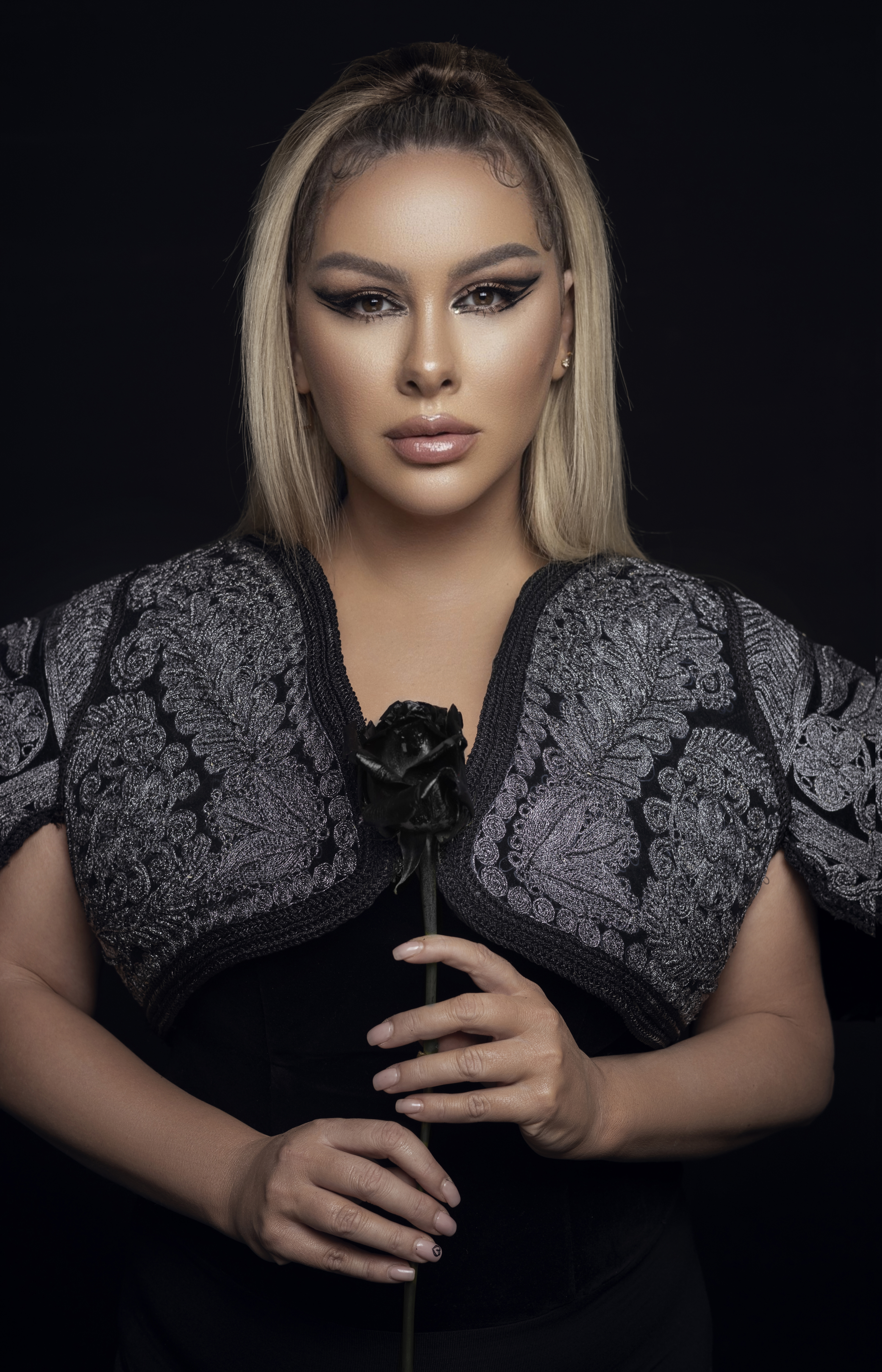
- Luma in 2022

Background information
- Born: 12 May 1986 (age 40); Pristina, SAP Kosovo, SFR Yugoslavia (present-day Kosovo)
- Genres: Pop; RnB
- Occupations: Singer; songwriter; TV presenter

Vesa Luma (born 12 May 1986) is a Kosovo-Albanian singer, songwriter and entertainer, recognized for her contributions to the Balkan music scene. With a career spanning several years, she has released numerous hit songs that blend traditional and contemporary sounds. Vesa Luma's work is characterized by her distinctive vocal style and ability to connect with a wide audience, earning her a dedicated fan base both regionally and internationally.

In 2012, Luma was chosen to be a judge and mentor on the X Factor TV series, in Albania. She also participated in Dancing with the Stars.

Besides her music career, Luma has also had a career in the television industry, having been a TV presenter for several years and produced her own TV show in Kosovo. She has also contributed to various charities.

In 2023, she was selected to compete in Festivali i Këngës 62, along with Big Basta, with the song "Mbinatyrale". She was part of the Albanian jury at the Junior Eurovision Song Contest 2024.
