= Bojken Lako =

Albanian singer, composer and television director (born 1975)

- Born: 25 May 1975 (age 51); Tirana, People's Socialist Republic of Albania
- Years active: 1993–present
- Musical career
- Genres: Alternative rock; Industrial rock
- Occupations: singer, composer, multi-instrumentalist, television director
- Instruments: vocals

Bojken Lako (born in 1975) is an Albanian singer, composer and multi-instrumentalist known for his work in alternative and industrial rock. He is also an author and director of various television and radio programs in Albania. Lako began his musical career in 1993 with the release of the album "King of Beers", alongside his band "The Fish Hook". He came to wider public attention in 1999 with the hit single, Asgjë e largët, included in the album "Monitor".

== Career ==
Since the early 1990s, Lako has been involved in forming and leading several rock groups, including "The Fish Hook", "The Hook", "Bojken Lako and the Fish", "Bojken Lako Band" and "Breza", with which he has performed at international festivals and released multiple albums.

Several of his works are known for their symbolic, social and political undertones. The song “Rrugë” is dedicated to the opening of the Kosovo–Albania border and also carries metaphorical references to themes of speed and drug effects in contemporary society. The 2001 song “Merre Lehtë”, directed by conceptual artist Gentian Shkurti and featuring backing vocals by Elina Duni, delivers a message of overcoming drug dependence; the video was filmed during an international tour in North Macedonia, during a period of inter-ethnic conflict and incorporates imagery referencing Albania's communist past.

His next song, “Bio”, promotes personal authenticity and openness, addressing social attitudes toward sexual orientation and advocating for a more open-minded society. “Qielli dhe Toka” includes backing vocals by Albanian singer Eneda Tarifa. “Lot Jetë Dashuri” is dedicated to the late poet, Drita Çomo, while “Shtëpia e sëmurë” became widely popular for its themes related to the Kosovo War, with lyrics written by playwright Teki Dervishi and backing vocals recorded by two young girls from Klinë, who had taken refuge in Albania, in 1999.

In 2020, Lako released the song “Kënga e trimave”, a remake of the original soundtrack to the film “Udha e Shkronjave”, composed by Kujtim Laro. Two years later, he would perform the very same song, in collaboration with the RTSH Symphony Orchestra, as part of a worldwide awareness campaign calling for an end to the war in Ukraine.

Lako is one of the creative founders of Top Albania Radio and has played an important role in shaping music programming at the national public broadcaster, Top Channel. He has authored and directed several major Albanian television programs and festivals, including Top Fest, Top Select, Promo Zone, Bulza and Tirana Art Fest.

== Personal life ==
Bojken Lako is the son of renowned Albanian actor, Bujar Lako. He was previously in a long-term relationship with Kosovo Albanian actress Arta Muçaj and later became romantically involved with Semi Jaupaj, a leading member of the band "Grifshat".

== Discography ==
=== Albums ===
Year	Album
1993	King of Beers
1999	Monitor

=== Singles ===
Year	Song
1999	"Asgjë e largët"
—	"Rrugë"
2001	"Merre Lehtë"
—	"Ndiq instiktin"
—	"Dritë"
—	"Mallkimi"
—	"Dua apo duhet"
—	"Pa emër"
—	"Sytë e shpirtit"
—	"Të ndjej"
—	"I lirë"
2012	"Bio"
—	"Qielli dhe Toka"
—	"Puthe fatin"
—	"Bulza"
—	"Take It Easy"
—	"Lot Jetë Dashuri"
—	"Shtëpia e sëmurë"
—	"Heroj't"
2018	"Mono" (feat. Alban Kondi & Kastro Zizo)
2020	"Kënga e trimave"
