= Young Zerka =

Albanian singer and songwriter

- Born: Donald Najtellari; Korçë, Albania
- Genres: Reggae; pop
- Occupations: Singer; songwriter
- Years active: 2007–present

Donald Najtellari (Albanian: [dɔ'nald 'najtɛɫaɾi];, known professionally as Young Zerka, is an Albanian singer and songwriter. Born in Korçë and raised in London, Najtellari grew up in a Jamaican household and began singing and writing music as a teenager. He later relocated to Albania and eventually rose to significant prominence in the Albanian-speaking Balkans. His musical career is marked by fusing elements of reggae and pop as well as his distinctive vocal and writing style.

== Life and career ==
Najtellari was born into an Albanian family in the city of Korçë, Albania. At an early age, Najtellari emigrated to England settling in the city of London. He was raised in a Jamaican household, which according to him, had a particular influence on his artistic formation. In both 2008 and 2009, Najtellari appeared on the music competition Top Fest with the songs "Sfera" and "Shpirt i plakur", respectively. In 2014, he was featured on Kosovo-Albanian singer Dhurata Dora's "Roll" and "A Bombi", as well as on Albanian singer Alban Skënderaj's "24 orë". In December 2014, he collaborated with Albanian singer Aurela Gaçe on the single "Pa kontroll", with whom they eventually won the 16th edition of the annual music competition Kënga Magjike. His success continued in May 2015 with the release of the follow-up single "Boom Boom", which reached number 11 in Albania.

Following the 2022 release of his original song, "Nafije", produced by popular artist and producer Alandy, on January 12, 2023, a remix was introduced to the public. The collaboration between Young Zerka, DJ Geek, Dafina Zeqiri, and MC Kresha peaked charts in Albania at #2 on Top Music Awards. Young Zerka, along with Alandy, appeared on Albania's top performing television show hosted by Luana Vjollca, Zemër Luana, for a debut television performance of the original "Nafije".

== Artistry ==
Najtellari's musical style has generally been regarded as reggae and pop. His musical inspiration varies from reagge musicians such as Bob Marley and Peter Tosh to pop artists as for instance Michael Jackson.

== Discography ==
=== Extended play ===
- High Five (2020)

=== Singles ===
==== As lead artist ====
List of singles as lead artist, with selected chart positions
Title	Year	Peak chart positions	Album
Title	Year	ALB	Album
"Boom Boom"	2015	11	Non-album singles
"Like Rihanna"	2016	13	Non-album singles
"Love"	2016	2	Non-album singles
"Syni i jemi" (with Ronela Hajati)	2016	—	Non-album singles
"Harem"	2016	32	Non-album singles
"A ma fal"	2017	—	Non-album singles
"Anna"	2018	—	Non-album singles
"Nuk ma nin"	2018	53	Non-album singles
"Lule bore" (with Jumpa)	2019	2	Non-album singles
"Ting Ting"	2019	11	Non-album singles
"Yalla"	2019	8	Non-album singles
"Nesër" (with Anila Mimani)	2019	5	Non-album singles
"Money" (with Eri Dee)	2019	42	Non-album singles
"Y.O.U." (with Niza)	2019	—	Non-album singles
"Whine for me" (with Niza)	2019	—	Non-album singles
"Let me thru" (with Niza)	2019	48	Non-album singles
"Pa gajle" (with Fifi)	2020	34	Non-album singles
"Pishman" (featuring Argjentina Ramosaj)	2020	27	Non-album singles
"Konflikt"	2020	23	Non-album singles
"—" denotes a recording that did not chart or was not released in that territory.

==== As featured artist ====
List of singles as featured artist, with selected chart positions
Title	Year	Peak chart positions	Album
Title	Year	ALB	Album
"Pa Lule" (Kastro Zizo featuring Young Zerka)	2013	—N/a	Non-album singles
"Roll" (Dhurata Dora featuring Young Zerka)	2014	—N/a	Non-album singles
"Hotel" (Enzo featuring Andrei Vornicu and Young Zerka)	2014	—N/a	Non-album singles
"24 orë" (Alban Skënderaj featuring Young Zerka)	2014	—N/a	Non-album singles
"A Bombi" (Dhurata Dora featuring Young Zerka)	2014	—N/a	Non-album singles
"Pa kontroll" (Aurela Gaçe featuring Young Zerka)	2014	—N/a	Non-album singles
"Papalove" (Kastro Zizo featuring Young Zerka)	2014	—N/a	Non-album singles
"Habibi" (Dj Flow featuring Young Zerka)	2016	—	Non-album singles
"Uhh Baby" (Dj Viper featuring Young Zerka)	2016	—	Non-album singles
"Nona" (Ledri Vula featuring Young Zerka)	2017	14	Non-album singles
"Belly Dancer" (Dj Moh Green featuring Faydee and Young Zerka)	2018	—	Non-album singles
"Deja Vu" (Alban Skënderaj featuring Young Zerka)	2018	5	Non-album singles
"Smile" (Keepman featuring Young Zerka)	2018	80	Non-album singles
"Kce sonte" (Dj Dagz and Dj Pm featuring Young Zerka)	2019	32	Non-album singles
"—" denotes a recording that did not chart or was not released in that territory.
