= Alketa Vejsiu =

Albanian television presenter (born 1984)

- Born: 19 January 1984 (age 41); Tirana, PSR Albania
- Education: University of Tirana
- Occupations: Television presenter; producer; entrepreneur; model; singer
- Years active: 1992–present

Alketa Vejsiu (born 19 January 1984) is an Albanian television presenter, entrepreneur, producer and singer.

== Career ==
=== Television ===
- Gjeniu i Vogël
- Dancing with the Stars
- X Factor
- Dance with Me
- Your Face Sounds Familiar
- Festivali i Këngës 2019
- Sanremo Music Festival 2020
- Sanremo Music Festival 2021
- Në kurthin e Piter Pan
