= Albania in the Eurovision Song Contest 2020 =

- Eurovision Song Contest 2020
- Participating broadcaster: Radio Televizioni Shqiptar (RTSH)
- Country: Albania
- Selection process: Festivali i Këngës 58
- Selection date: 22 December 2019

Competing entry
- Song: "Fall from the Sky"
- Artist: Arilena Ara
- Songwriters: Darko Dimitrov; Lazar Cvetkoski; Arilena Ara; Michael Blue; Robert Stevenson; Sam Schummer

Placement
- Final result: Contest cancelled

Participation chronology

Albania was set to be represented at the Eurovision Song Contest 2020 in Rotterdam, the Netherlands, with the song "Fall from the Sky" performed by Arilena Ara. Its selected entry was chosen through the national selection competition Festivali i Këngës organised by Radio Televizioni Shqiptar (RTSH) in December 2019. To this point, the nation had participated in the Eurovision Song Contest sixteen times since its first entry in 2004. In March 2020, the European Broadcasting Union (EBU) announced the contest's cancellation due to the pandemic of the coronavirus disease 2019 (COVID-19) and its rapid spread across Europe.

== Background ==
Prior to the 2020 contest, Albania had participated in the Eurovision Song Contest sixteen times since its first entry in 2004. The country's highest placing in the contest, to this point, had been the fifth place, which it achieved in 2012 with the song "Suus" performed by Rona Nishliu. The first entry was performed by Anjeza Shahini with the song "The Image of You" and finished in the seventh place, Albania's second-highest placing to date. During its tenure in the contest, Albania failed to qualify for the final seven times, with both the 2016 and 2017 entries being the most recent non-qualifiers. Since the 2018 contest, Albania qualified for the grand final in both the 2018 and 2019 contest, with Eugent Bushpepa finishing in eleventh place with "Mall" and Jonida Maliqi placing in seventeenth place with "Ktheju tokës".

In July 2019, the national broadcaster of Albania, Radio Televizioni Shqiptar (RTSH), officially confirmed Albania's participation in the Eurovision Song Contest 2020 in Rotterdam, the Netherlands. RTSH broadcasts the contest within Albania and organises the selection process for the nation's entry. Since its debut in 2004, it has consistently selected its entry through the long-standing competition Festivali i Këngës.

== Before Eurovision ==
=== Festivali i Këngës ===
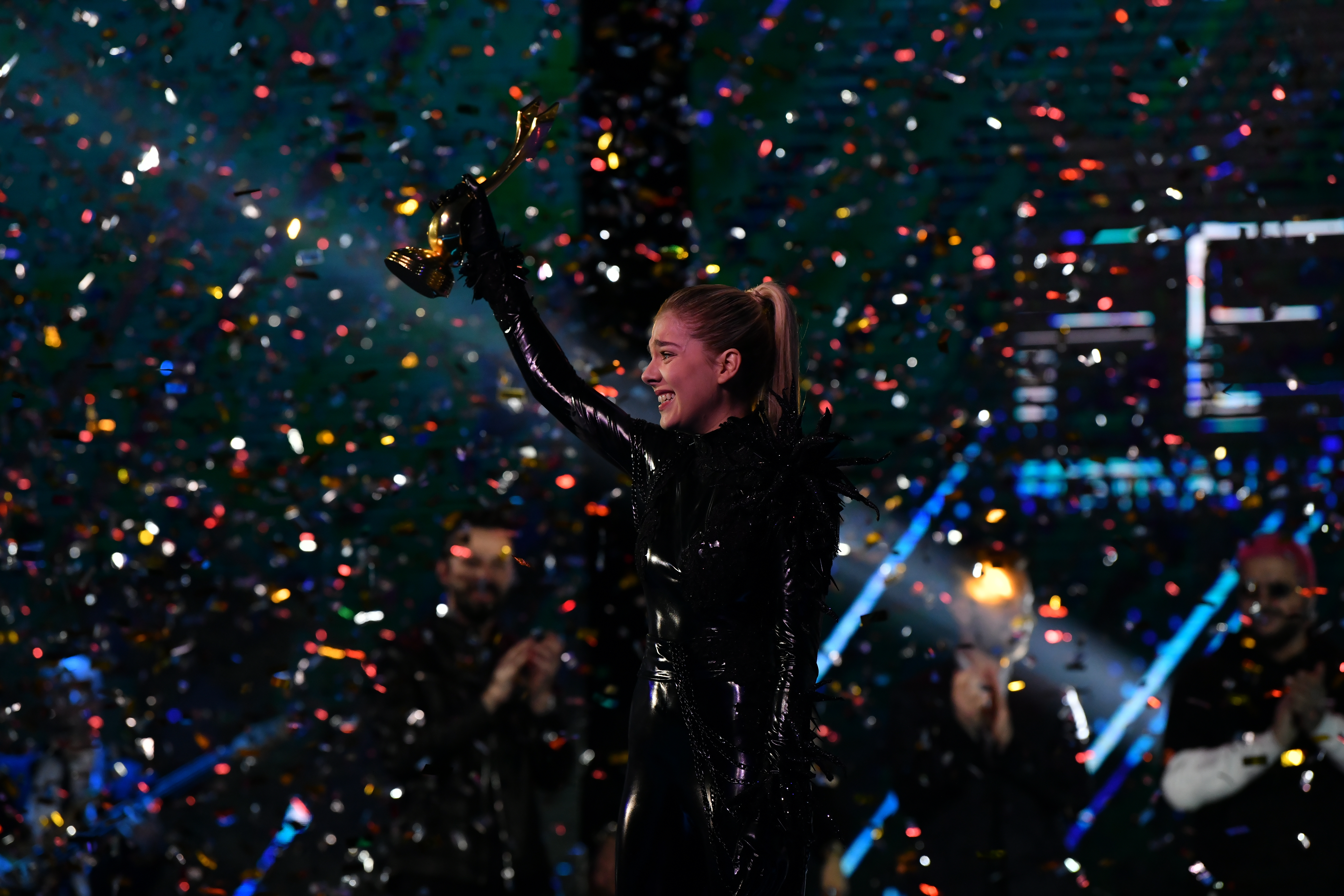
Arilena Ara after winning the 58th edition of Festivali i Këngës in December 2019.

Radio Televizioni Shqiptar (RTSH) organised the 58th edition of Festivali i Këngës in order to select the nation's representative for the Eurovision Song Contest 2020. The competition consisted of two semi-finals on 19 and 20 December, respectively, and the grand final on 22 December 2019. From May 2019 to September 2019, artists were able to submit their entries to the broadcaster. An artistic committee reviewed the received submissions and chose 20 artists and songs shortlisted to compete in the semi-finals of Festivali i Këngës.

==== Contestants ====
Contestants
Artist(s)	Song	Songwriter(s)
Albërie Hadërgjonaj	"Ku ta gjej dikë ta dua"	Adrian Hila; Timo Flloko
Aldo Bardhi	"Melodi"	Antoni Polimeni; Richy Sebastian; Aldo Bardhi
Arilena Ara	"Shaj"	Darko Dimitrov; Lazar Cvetkoski; Lindon Berisha
Bojken Lako	"Malaseen"	Bojken Lako
Devis Xherahu	"Bisedoj me serenatën"	Devis Xherahu; Jorgo Papingji
Eli Fara and Stresi	"Bohem"	Eli Fara; Rozana Radi
Elvana Gjata	"Me tana"	Elvana Gjata
Era Rusi	"Eja merre"	Darko Dimitrov; Era Rusi
Gena	"Shqiponja e lirë"	Gena; Endrit Mumajesi
Genc Tukiçi and Nadia Tukiçi	"Ju flet Tirana"	Genc Tukiçi; Agim Xheka
Kamela Islamaj	"Më ngjyros"	Kamela Islamaj; Megi Hasani
Kanita Suma	"Ankth"	Boban Apostolov; Lindon Berisha
Kastro Zizo	"Asaj"	Gramoz Kozeli; Klevis Bega
Olta Boka	"Botë për dy"	Florent Boshnjaku; Genc Salihu
Renis Gjoka	"Loja"	Renis Gjoka; Ilir Krasniqi
Robert Berisha	"Ajo nuk është unë"	Filloreta Raci
Sara Bajraktari	"Ajër"	Adrian Hila
Tiri Gjoci	"Me gotën bosh"	Everest Ndreca; Pandi Laço
Valon Shehu	"Kutia e Pandorës"	Eugent Bushpepa; Elvis Preni
Wendi Mancaku	"Ende"	Wendi Mancaku; Endrit Mumajesi

==== Shows ====
===== Semi-finals =====
The semi-finals of Festivali i Këngës took place on 19 December and 20 December 2020 and were broadcast live at 21:00 (CET) on the respective dates. Ten songs competed in each semi-final with five entries in the first and seven in the second semi-final qualifying for the final. The qualifying songs were selected by a jury panel consisting of two national and three international members with connections to the Eurovision Song Contest. The jury panel was composed of Christer Björkman, Dimitris Kontopoulos, Felix Bergsson, Mikaela Minga and Rita Petro. The first semi-final was opened by the country's Eurovision Song Contest 2019 representative Jonida Maliqi performing her song "Ktheju tokës". The interval act included Mahmood performing his songs "Barrio" and "Soldi". The interval act in the second semi-final featured Agim Krajka and Lindita Theodhori with the song "Kafe Flora". After the semi-finals, the votes of an expert jury panel selected twelve songs to advance to the grand final.

===== Final =====
The grand final of Festivali i Këngës took place on 22 December 2019 and was broadcast live at 21:00 (CET). The final featured guest performances by Eleni Foureira and Giusy Ferreri. Twelve songs competed and the winner was determined by the combination of the votes from a five-member jury panel. Each member of the jury voted by assigning scores from 1–10, 13 and 18 points to their preferred songs. Before the end of the show, Arilena Ara emerged as the winner with "Shaj" and was simultaneously announced as Albania's representative for the Eurovision Song Contest 2020.

Final – 22 December 2019
R/O	Artist	Song	Points	Place
1	Valon Shehu	"Kutia e Pandorës"	23	8
2	Sara Bajraktari	"Ajër"	50	3
3	Robert Berisha	"Ajo nuk është unë"	18	10
4	Tiri Gjoci	"Me gotën bosh"	23	8
5	Bojken Lako	"Malaseen"	45	4
6	Arilena Ara	"Shaj"	67	1
7	Gena	"Shqiponja e lirë"	18	10
8	Kamela Islamaj	"Më ngjyros"	35	6
9	Albërie Hadërgjonaj	"Ku ta gjej dikë ta dua"	27	7
10	Elvana Gjata	"Me tana"	64	2
11	Olta Boka	"Botë për dy"	17	12
12	Era Rusi	"Eja merre"	43	5

=== Promotion ===
An accompanying lyric video for "Fall from the Sky" premiered on the official YouTube channel of the Eurovision Song Contest on 10 March 2020. For further promotion, Arilena was scheduled to embark on a small tour with live performances at various Eurovision Song Contest-related events, including in Amsterdam, London and Madrid, before the tour was cancelled due to the pandemic of the coronavirus disease 2019 (COVID-19). The first live performance of the song was broadcast during Arilena's Sounds of Silence concert at the Mother Teresa Square in Tirana on 2 May 2020 as well as the European Broadcasting Union's Eurovision Home Concerts series on 8 May 2020.

== At Eurovision ==
The Eurovision Song Contest 2020 was initially scheduled to take place at Rotterdam Ahoy in Rotterdam, Netherlands, and consist of two semi-finals on 12 and 14 May, and the grand final on 16 May 2020. According to the Eurovision rules, each participating country, except the host country and the "Big Five", consisting of France, Germany, Italy, Spain and the United Kingdom, would have been required to qualify from one of two semi-finals to compete for the final, although the top 10 countries from the respective semi-final would have progressed to the grand final. In January, it was announced that Albania would be performing in the second half of the second semi-final of the contest. However, in March, the European Broadcasting Union (EBU) announced the contest's cancellation due to the COVID-19 pandemic in Europe. With respect to Arilena and her entry "Fall from the Sky" participating in the 2021 contest, the EBU announced soon after that entries intended for 2020 would not be eligible for the following year, though each broadcaster would be able to send either their 2020 representative or a new one. By September 2020, RTSH announced that they planned to instead host the next edition of Festivali i Këngës to choose their 2021 entry.

=== Alternative song contests ===
The broadcasters who were planned to take part in the Eurovision Song Contest 2020 organised alternative music competitions. Amongst them, Austrian broadcaster, ORF, organised Der kleine Song Contest in April 2020, which saw every entry being assigned to one of three semi-finals. A jury, consisting of ten members that had represented Austria at the contest before, was hired to rank each song, with the highest-placed in each semi-final advancing to the final round. In the third semi-final on 18 April, Albania placed fourth in a field of thirteen participants, achieving a total of 62 points. Swedish broadcaster, Sveriges Television, additionally organised Sveriges 12:a, in which Albania was scheduled to participate on 9 May 2020.
