= Festivali i Këngës 58 =

58th edition of Festivali i Këngës

Dates and venue
- Semi-final 1: 19 December 2019
- Semi-final 2: 20 December 2019
- Final: 22 December 2019
- Venue: Pallati i Kongreseve, Tirana

Organisation
- Host broadcaster: Radio Televizioni Shqiptar (RTSH)
- Presenters: Alketa Vejsiu

Participants
- Number of entries: 20

Vote
- Voting system: Jury selected the top three contestants and the Albanian representative for the Eurovision Song Contest 2020.
- Winning song: "Shaj" by Arilena Ara

The Festivali i Këngës 58 was the 58th edition of the annual Albanian music competition Festivali i Këngës. It was organised by Radio Televizioni Shqiptar (RTSH) at the Pallati i Kongreseve in Tirana, Albania, and consisted of two semi-finals on 19 and 20 December, respectively, and the final on 22 December 2019. The three live shows were hosted by Alketa Vejsiu. The winner of the contest was Arilena Ara with the song "Shaj", after receiving 67 points with two points ahead over Elvana Gjata with the song "Me tana". Ara was then scheduled to represent Albania in the Eurovision Song Contest 2020 in Rotterdam, the Netherlands, before its cancellation related to the pandemic of the coronavirus disease 2019 (COVID-19).

== Background and format ==
The 58th edition of Festivali i Këngës was organised by Radio Televizioni Shqiptar (RTSH) for determining for determining Albania's representative for the Eurovision Song Contest 2020. The former consisted of two semi-finals on 19 and 20 December, respectively, and the final on 22 December 2019, and was held at the Pallati i Kongreseve in Tirana. The three live shows were hosted by Albanian television presenter Alketa Vejsiu.

=== Interval acts ===
On 31 October 2020, RTSH released the first details of the interval acts. The opening act of the first semi-final featured Albanian singer Jonida Maliqi performing "Ktheju tokës". The interval act featured Italian singer Mahmood, who performed "Barrio" and "Soldi". The second semi-final's interval act included Agim Krajka and Lindita Theodhori who performed "Kafe Flora". During the grand final, Italian singer Giusy Ferreri and Albanian-born Greek singer Eleni Foureira performed mashups of several of their songs.

== Contestants ==
Prior to the scheduled event, in October 2019, RTSH published a provisory list of 20 artists shortlisted to compete in the two semi-finals of Festivali i Këngës, with the songs being revealed on 9 December. The broadcaster had previously opened a submission period for artists and composers to participate in the competition between May and September 2019.

Participating entries
Artist(s)	Song	Composer(s)	Lyricist
Albërie Hadërgjonaj	"Ku ta gjej dikë ta dua"	Adrian Hila	Timo Flloko
Aldo Bardhi	"Melodi"	Antoni Polimeni, Richy Sebastian	Aldo Bardhi
Arilena Ara	"Shaj"	Darko Dimitrov, Lazar Cvetkoski	Lindon Berisha
Bojken Lako	"Malaseen"	Bojken Lako	
Devis Xherahu	"Bisedoj me serenatën"	Devis Xherahu	Jorgo Papingji
Eli Fara and Stresi	"Bohem"	Eli Fara	Rozana Radi
Elvana Gjata	"Me tana"	Elvana Gjata	
Era Rusi	"Eja merre"	Darko Dimitrov	Era Rusi
Gena	"Shqiponja e lirë"	Gena	Endrit Mumajesi
Genc Tukiçi and Nadia Tukiçi	"Ju flet Tirana"	Genc Tukiçi	Agim Xheka
Kamela Islamaj	"Më ngjyros"	Kamela Islamaj	Megi Hasani
Kanita Suma	"Ankth"	Boban Apostolov	Lindon Berisha
Kastro Zizo	"Asaj"	Gramoz Kozeli, Klevis Bega	
Olta Boka	"Botë për dy"	Florent Boshnjaku	Genc Salihu
Renis Gjoka	"Loja"	Renis Gjoka	Ilir Krasniqi
Robert Berisha	"Ajo nuk është unë"	Filloreta Raci	
Sara Bajraktari	"Ajër"	Adrian Hila	
Tiri Gjoci	"Me gotën bosh"	Everest Ndreca	Pandi Laço
Valon Shehu	"Kutia e Pandorës"	Eugent Bushpepa	Elvis Preni
Wendi Mancaku	"Ende"	Wendi Mancaku	Endrit Mumajesi

== Semi-finals ==
=== Semi-final 1 ===
The first semi-final of Festivali i Këngës took place on 19 December 2019 and was broadcast live at 21:00 (CET). The qualifying songs were selected by a jury panel consisting of two national and three international members with connections to the Eurovision Song Contest. 10 contestants participated in the first semi-final, while the highlighted contestants qualified for the grand final. The first semi-final was opened by the country's Eurovision Song Contest 2019 representative Jonida Maliqi performing her song "Ktheju tokës". The interval act included Mahmood performing his songs "Barrio" and "Soldi".

Semi-final 1 – 19 December 2019
R/O	Artist(s)	Song
1	Bojken Lako	"Malaseen"
2	Kanita Suma	"Ankth"
3	Devis Xherahu	"Bisedoj me serenatën"
4	Aldo Bardhi	"Melodi"
5	Kamela Islamaj	"Më ngjyros"
6	Genc Tukiçi and Nadia Tukiçi	"Ju flet Tirana"
7	Sara Bajraktari	"Ajër"
8	Elvana Gjata	"Me tana"
9	Renis Gjoka	"Loja"
10	Albërie Hadërgjonaj	"Ku ta gjej dikë ta dua"

=== Semi-final 2 ===
The second semi-final of Festivali i Këngës took place on 20 December 2019 and was broadcast live at 21:00 (CET). The qualifying songs were selected by a jury panel consisting of two national and three international members with connections to the Eurovision Song Contest. 10 contestants participated in the second semi-final, while the highlighted contestants qualified for the grand final. The interval act in the second semi-final featured Agim Krajka and Lindita Theodhori with the song "Kafe Flora".

Semi-final 2 – 20 December 2019
R/O	Artist(s)	Song
1	Robert Berisha	"Ajo nuk është unë"
2	Wendi Mancaku	"Ende"
3	Kastro Zizo	"Asaj"
4	Tiri Gjoci	"Me gotën bosh"
5	Era Rusi	"Eja merre"
6	Olta Boka	"Botë për dy"
7	Valon Shehu	"Kutia e Pandorës"
8	Arilena Ara	"Shaj"
9	Eli Fara and Stresi	"Bohem"
10	Gena	"Shqiponja e lirë"

== Final ==
The grand final of the competition took place on 22 December 2019 and was broadcast live at 21:00 (CET). The contestants that qualified for the final were announced on 21 December 2019, and the winner was determined by a five-member jury consisting of two Albanian members and three international members with connections to the Eurovision Song Contest. The five-member jury was made up of Christer Björkman (Sweden), Dimitris Kontopoulos (Greece), Felix Bergsson (Iceland), Mikaela Minga (Albania) and Rita Petro (Albania). Each member of the jury voted by assigning scores from 1–10, 13 and 18 points to their preferred songs. Before the end of the show, Arilena Ara emerged as the winner with "Shaj" and was simultaneously announced as Albania's representative for the Eurovision Song Contest 2020.

Final – 22 December 2019
R/O	Artist	Song	C. Björkman	D. Kontopoulos	F. Bergsson	M. Minga	R. Petro	Total	Place
1	Valon Shehu	"Kutia e Pandorës"	1	2	7	7	6	23	8
2	Sara Bajraktari	"Ajër"	13	10	10	8	9	50	3
3	Robert Berisha	"Ajo nuk është unë"	9	3	2	3	1	18	10
4	Tiri Gjoci	"Me gotën bosh"	2	4	8	6	3	23	8
5	Bojken Lako	"Malaseen"	3	8	3	18	13	45	4
6	Arilena Ara	"Shaj"	10	13	13	13	18	67	1
7	Gena	"Shqiponja e lirë"	4	7	1	1	5	18	10
8	Kamela Islamaj	"Më ngjyros"	6	6	4	9	10	35	6
9	Albërie Hadërgjonaj	"Ku ta gjej dikë ta dua"	7	5	6	5	4	27	7
10	Elvana Gjata	"Me tana"	18	18	18	2	8	64	2
11	Olta Boka	"Botë për dy"	5	1	5	4	2	17	12
12	Era Rusi	"Eja merre"	8	9	9	10	7	43	5

== Controversy ==
Following the results of the competition, mixed reactions followed, with multiple individuals criticising the results itself and attributing the singer's victory to arranged voting. All three international jurors ranked runner-up Elvana Gjata first, whereas the two Albanian jurors placed her performance substantially lower. Host Alketa Vejsiu expressed her dissatisfaction with the Albanian jury members' votes, stating "I believe in meritocracy and I am deeply sorry that in this platform I could not give voice to the public. I am sorry if I disappointed [the public and Elvana], I understand and respect your sensibility please spare me of accusations. I was not the jury and I did not choose the jury." Jury member Mikaela Minga, who awarded "Me tana" two points, later stated that she down-voted the song due to its "gypsy influence", stating it wasn't "Albanian enough".

== See also ==
- Eurovision Song Contest 2020
- Albania in the Eurovision Song Contest 2020
