= Tuna (disambiguation) =

A tuna is a fish from the family Scombridae which is heavily fished commercially.

Tuna may also refer to:

== Fiction ==
- Charlie the Tuna, corporate mascot
- Tuna, comics character Tsuna Sawada
- Tuna, a drug dealer in Blow (film)
- A nickname for Jim Halpert in U.S. television series The Office

== Music ==
- Hot Tuna, an American rock band
- "Tuna 1613", a song on the Therion album Gothic Kabbalah
- Tuna (music), a music group made up of university students from Iberia or Latin America
- Tuna (singer), a Macedonian-Albanian singer and songwriter
- Tuna (rapper), an Israeli rapper and actor

== Places ==
- Tuna, a village in McKean County, Pennsylvania
- Tuna, Iran, a village in Lorestan Province, Iran
- Tuna, Vimmerby, a village in Sweden
- Tuna, Nyköping, a parish in Sweden centred in Enstaberga
- Tuna Court District, a district of Medelpad in Sweden
- Tuna Grand Court District, a district of Dalarna in Sweden
- Tuna Port, a port in Kutch, India
- Tuna, San Germán, Puerto Rico, a barrio
- Tuna, Turkish name for the Danube River
- Tuna, a locality on Salisbury Road near Midhirst, Taranaki, New Zealand. There was formerly a Tuna Post Office and a Tuna School.

== Ships ==
- HMCS Tuna, a ship of the Royal Canadian Navy
- HMS Tuna, more than one ship of the British Royal Navy
- USS Tuna, more than one United States Navy ship

== Other uses ==
- S.V. Tuna, a Surinamese association football club
- Tuna (name), a given name and a family name (including lists of persons with the name)
- Tuna (Polynesian mythology), an eel god
- TUNA, Transurethral needle ablation of the prostate
- Tuna, the pre-release codename for the Galaxy Nexus smart phone
- Tuna (magazine), Estonian magazine
- Tuna, Spanish for prickly pear, the fruit of the Opuntia cacti
- Tuna, the Māori word for the New Zealand longfin eel
- Tunalikevirus, a genus of viruses whose type species is Enterobacteria phage T1 (T-un)

== See also ==
- Chali 2na, an MC and rap artist
- Tuner (disambiguation)
- Tunny (disambiguation), words related to another name for Tuna
- Las Tunas (disambiguation)
  - Las Tunas (city), Cuban city
  - Las Tunas Province, Cuban province
- White tuna (disambiguation)
- Greater Tuna, off-Broadway play about fictional Tuna, Texas
