= Lindon Berisha =

Macedonian-Albanian pop singer (born 1989)

- Born: 7 June 1989 (age 36); Skopje, SR Macedonia, SFR Yugoslavia (present-day North Macedonia)
- Genres: Pop
- Occupations: Singer; songwriter
- Years active: 2009–present

Lindon Berisha (Albanian: [linˈdɔn bɛˈɾiʃa]; born 7 June 1989), also known mononymously as Lindon, is an Albanian pop singer.

== Life and career ==
=== 1990–2015 ===
Lindon Berisha was born on 7 June 1989 into an Albanian family in the city of Skopje, then part of the Socialist Republic of Macedonia, present North Macedonia. His father, Agron Berisha, was also a popular singer and songwriter during the late 20th century. Berisha made his breakthrough in the Albanian-speaking world in 2015 and 2016 as he was featured on the singles "Kalle", "Asnihere" and "Money" by Macedonian-Albanian singer Adrian Gaxha.

=== 2016–present ===
Following his success, Berisha continued his production career producing and writing songs for other Albanian artists. In 2016, Arilena Ara participated in the 18th edition of Kënga Magjike with the song "Nëntori" written by Berisha. The song finished in the third place and attained commercial success in Romania, Russia and Eastern Europe reaching number one in the Romanian Airplay Charts. Three years later, in 2019, he wrote another song for Arilena Ara titled "Shaj", which won the 58th edition of Festivali i Këngës. The artist will therefore represent Albania in the Eurovision Song Contest 2020 in Rotterdam, the Netherlands. In February 2020, "Flm Klm" was premiered and went on to reach number seventy eight in Albania.

== Discography ==
=== Singles ===
==== As lead artist ====
Title	Year	Peak chart positions	Album
Title	Year	ALB	Album
"Bye Bye"	2009	—	Non-album single
"Pare" (with Shpend Latifi)	2015	—	Non-album single
"Syn" (with Florian Beqiri)	2015	—	Non-album single
"Dale"	2016	—	Non-album single
"Lolo"	2017	—	Non-album single
"Summer Luv"	2017	17	Non-album single
"Merri Krejt"	2017	84	Non-album single
"Sikur Yje" (with Luiza)	2019	—	Non-album single
"Flm Klm"	2020	78	Non-album single
"—" denotes a recording that did not chart or was not released in that territory.

==== As featured artist ====
Title	Year	Peak chart positions	Album
Title	Year	ALB	Album
"Kalle" (Adrian Gaxha featuring Lindon Berisha)	2015	13	Non-album single
"Asnihere" (Adrian Gaxha featuring Lindon Berisha)	2015	4	Non-album single
"Money" (Adrian Gaxha featuring Lindon Berisha)	2016	—	Non-album single
"T'kom Dasht" (Elinel featuring Lindon Berisha)	2016	—	Non-album single
"Hallall E Ke" (DJ PM and DJ Dagz featuring Lindon Berisha)	2018	—	Non-album single
"1 Xhiro" (2Ton featuring Lindon Berisha)	2018	—	Non-album single
"Stranger" (Kanita featuring Lindon Berisha)	2019	84	Non-album single
"Bella" (Eni Koçi featuring Lindon Berisha)	2019	—	Non-album single
"—" denotes a recording that did not chart or was not released in that territory.
