= Tune =

Tune may refer to:

== Music ==
- Tune (folk music), a piece of short instrumental music, usually with repeating sections, and often played a number of times
- Melody
- Song
- Tune-family
- Musical tuning

== People ==
- Clayton Tune (born 1999), American football player
- David Tune (born 1954), Australian public servant
- Dire Tune (born 1985), Ethiopian distance runner
- Tommy Tune (born 1939), American actor, dancer, singer, theatre director, producer, and choreographer

== Places ==
- Tune, Denmark
- Tune, Norway

== Other uses ==
- The Tune, a 1992 animated film by Bill Plympton
- Tune Pakistan, video sharing website, also known by its domain name tune.pk
- Tune Ventures, a Malaysian investment company

== See also ==
- Looney Tunes, a Warner Bros. animated cartoon series
- Tone (disambiguation)
- Toon (disambiguation)
- Tuner (disambiguation)
- Tunes (disambiguation)
- Tuning (disambiguation)
