= Tunis (disambiguation) =

Tunis is the capital and largest city of Tunisia.

Tunis may also refer to:

== Places and jurisdictions ==
- Tunis, Faiyum Governorate, Egypt, a village
- Tunis, Sohag Governorate, Egypt, a village
- Tunis, Michigan, an unincorporated community
- Tunis, Ontario, Canada, a community
- Tunis, Texas, United States, an unincorporated community and census-designated place
- Tunis Lake, a reservoir in New York, United States
- Tunis Eyalet, former autonomous state under the Ottoman Empire in North Africa
- Tunis Governorate, a governorate (province) of Tunisia
- 6362 Tunis, an asteroid
- Beylik of Tunis, a monarchy in Northern Africa between 1705 and 1881
- Gulf of Tunis, Tunisia
- Lake of Tunis, a natural lagoon between the city of Tunis and the Gulf of Tunis
- Roman Catholic Archdiocese of Tunis
- Tunis Run, a tributary of White Deer Creek in Centre County, Pennsylvania, United States

== People ==
- Tunis Campbell (1812–1891), African-American politician and clergyman
- Tunis Craven (1813–1864), US Navy officer
- T. A. M. Craven (1893–1972), US Navy officer and commissioner of the Federal Communications Commission
- Harold Alexander, 1st Earl Alexander of Tunis (1891-1969), British Field Marshal and Governor-General of Canada.
- Edwin Tunis (1897–1973), American author
- John R. Tunis (1889–1975), American sports journalist and novelist
- Staffan Tunis (born 1982), Finnish ski-orienteering competitor

== Sports ==
- Tunis Grand Prix, an auto race held in the 1920s and 1930s in Tunis, Tunisia
- Tunis Open, a tennis tournament

== Other uses ==
- TUNIS (Toronto University System), a UNIX-like operating system developed at the University of Toronto
- Tunis (sheep), a sheep breed
- Tunis University, Tunisia
- Battle of Tunis (255 BC), a Carthaginian victory over the Romans in the First Punic War
- Slap of Tunis, an expression used by the Italians in the 19th century
- Tunis 2050, a Tunisian television sitcom
- MS Tunis (1935), a Danish cargo ship

== See also ==
- Tunisia
- Tunes (disambiguation)
