= TUNA =

TUNA can mean:

- Tuna, a common name for a number of species of fish
- Transurethral needle ablation of the prostate, also known by the acronym TUNA

== See also ==
- Tuna (disambiguation)
