= Big Tuna =

Big Tuna may refer to:

== People ==
- Tony Accardo, organized crime leader
- Jim Halpert, a fictional character on the American television series The Office
- Trevor Hirschfield, Canadian Wheelchair Rugby player
- Bill Parcells, National Football League coach
- Jake Virtanen, former National Hockey League forward for the Vancouver Canucks
- A fictional character played by Vincent Barbi in the 1974 film "Black Belt Jones"

== Other uses ==
- A fictional Texas town featured in the 1990 novel Wild at Heart by Barry Gifford and its 1990 film adaptation
- A house band featured on the Starcraft II soundtrack album Revolution Overdrive: Songs of Liberty
- A nickname for the Olympus Zuiko Digital 300mm f/2.8 Four Thirds system camera lens

== See also ==
- Bigeye tuna (Thunnus obesus), a species of true tuna
- Tuna (disambiguation)
