= Tuna (name) =

Tuna (IPA: [tuˈna]) is a masculine Altaian given name. It means fertile, majestic, flamboyant and young in Oyrot. It is also a unisex Turkish given name and surname that comes from the same root. In Turkish, Tuna was a name for the Danube River in Ottoman times.

== People ==
=== Given name ===
- Tuna Aktürk, Turkish civil engineer
- Tuna Kiremitci, Turkish writer
- Tuna Üzümcü, Turkish footballer
- Tuna Scanlan, Samoan/New Zealand boxer of the 1950s and '60s
- Tuna Tunca (born 2003), Turkish autistic long-distance swimmer

=== Surname ===
- Cari Tuna (born 1985), American nonprofit businessperson
- Floriana Tuna, Romanian chemist at the University of Manchester
- Mustafa Tuna (born 1957), Turkish environmental engineer, politician and former mayor of Ankara
- Onur Tuna (born 1985), Turkish actor and singer
- Tamer Tuna (footballer, born 1976), Turkish football player and coach
- Tamer Tuna (footballer, born 1991), Turkish football player

== Stage name and other names ==
- Tuna (singer), Albanian singer-songwriter
- Tuna (rapper), Israeli rapper

== See also ==
- "The Big Tuna", nickname of several people
- Tona (name)
