= List of awards and nominations received by Arilena Ara =

The List of awards and nominations received by Arilena Ara refers to the awards and nominations which were received by Albanian singer Arilena Ara.

== Kënga Magjike ==
Kënga Magjike is an annual competition, which has been broadcast every year since its debut in 1999, and the second longest-running television competition in Albania. Arilena Ara has participated for the first time in 2016 and won two awards.

Year	Nominated work	Award	Result
2016	"Nëntori"	Best Ballad	Won
2016	"Nëntori"	Third Prize	Won

== Festivali i Këngës ==
Festivali i Këngës is an annual competition, which has been broadcast every year since its debut in 1962, and the longest-running television competition in Albania. Arilena Ara has participated for the first time in 2019 and has won the competition.

Year	Nominated work	Award	Result
2019	"Shaj"	First place	Won

== Astana Dausy ==
Year	Nominee / work	Award	Result
2017	"Nëntori"	Song of the Year	Won

== Videofest ==
Year	Nominee / work	Award	Result
2014	"Aeroplan"	Best New Artist	Nominated
