= Tunis, Sohag Governorate =

Village in Sohag Governorate, Egypt

Tunis تونس
- Village
- Location in Egypt
- Coordinates: 26°37′00″N 31°40′58″E
- Country: Egypt
- Governorate: Sohag
- Markaz: Sohag Markaz

Population (2006)
  - Total: 19,495
- Time zone: UTC+2 (EET)
  - Summer (DST): UTC+3 (EEST)

Tunis (Arabic: تونس, transctipion: Tūnis) is a village in Sohag Governorate, Egypt located in the Sohag Markaz. In 2006, it had a population of 19,495 people.
