= Tune up =

Tune up may refer to:

- Service (motor vehicle)
- "Tune Up", a Miles Davis jazz standard
- Tune-Up!, a 1972 album by Sonny Rollins
- Tune Up!, an album by Don Patterson

== See also ==
- Tuning (disambiguation)
