= Tunes =

Tunes may refer to:

== Places and jurisdictions ==
- Tunes (Silves), a parish in Portugal
- Tunes, Norway, a village in Norway
- Tunes, Tunisia, now Tunis, eponymous capital city of Tunisia
  - Tunes (see), a suppressed Latin Catholic titular bishopric; see Catholic Church in Tunisia

== Music ==
- Music
- iTunes, music software
- Tunes (album), an album by Spiers and Boden
- MC Tunes (born 1970), British rapper

== Other uses ==
- Tunes (confectionery), a brand of cough sweets in the UK
- Tunes (bug), a genus of assassin bug in the tribe Harpactorini
- Looney Tunes, a cartoon

== See also ==
- Tune (disambiguation)
- Tunis (disambiguation)
