= Arilena Ara =

Albanian singer (born 1998)

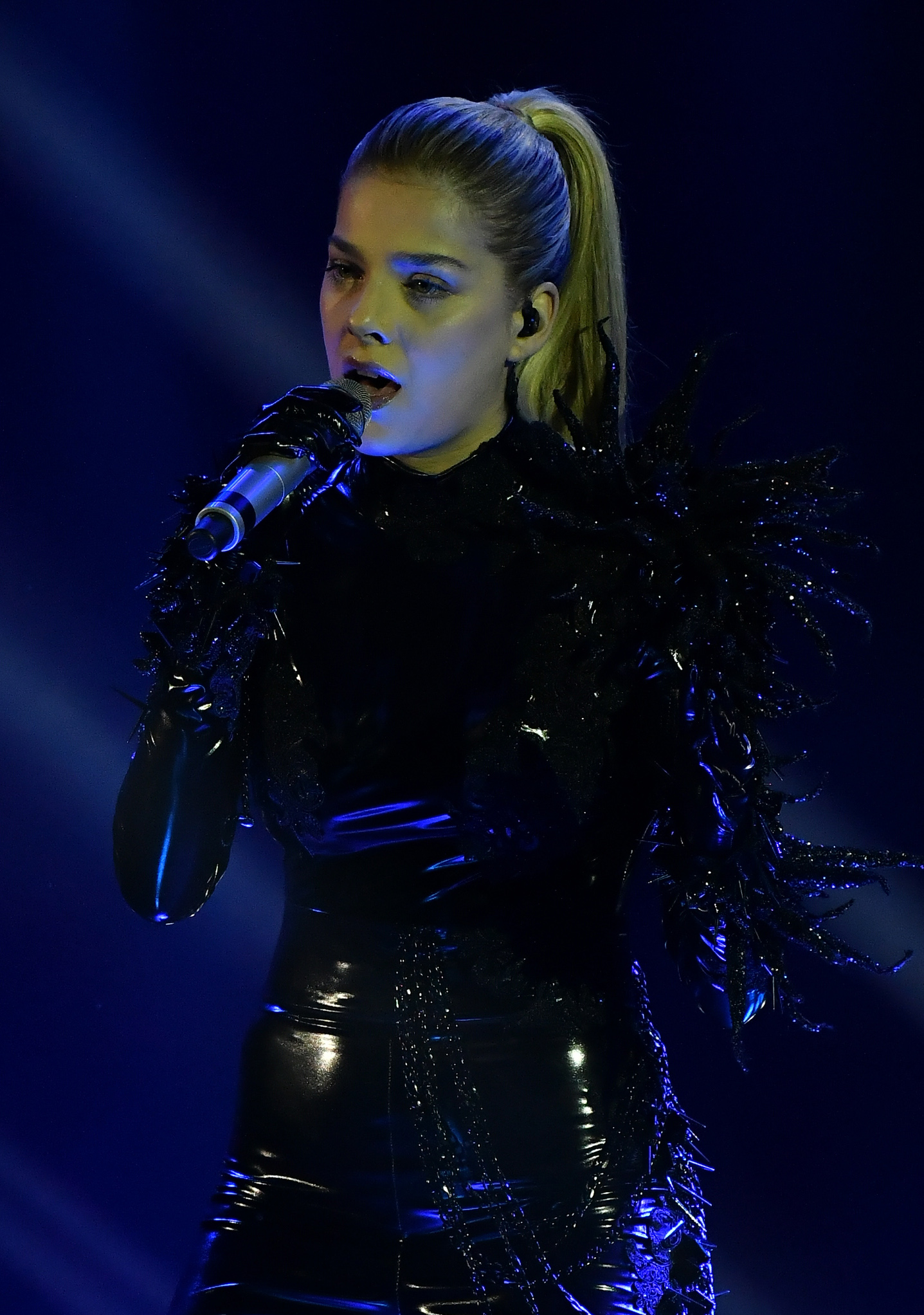
- Ara at the 58th edition of Festivali i Këngës in 2019
- Born: 17 July 1998 (age 28); Shkodër, Albania
- Occupation: Singer
- Years active: 2010–present
- Website: arilenaara.com

Arilena Ara (Albanian: [aɾiˈlɛna ˈaɾa]; born 17 July 1998) is an Albanian singer. Ara rose to national recognition in Albania, upon her victory at X Factor Albania in 2013. After her participation in the 18th edition of the music contest Kënga Magjike, her song "Nëntori" found significant success in Romania, peaking at number-one in the Romanian Airplay chart. Following her forthcoming success at the 58th edition of the music contest Festivali i Këngës in 2019, she was designated as the Albanian representative at the Eurovision Song Contest 2020, before the contest's cancellation.

== Life and career ==
=== 1998–2018: Early life and career beginnings ===
Arilena Ara was born on 17 July 1998 into an Albanian family in the city of Shkodër, Albania. Ara performed in various dancing and singing competitions as a child, including at the children's talent show Gjeniu i Vogël finishing in third place. She won the second series of the talent show X Factor Albania on 31 March 2013. Her first single, "Aeroplan", was released in February 2014. Finishing in third place, Ara participated in the 18th edition of the music contest Kënga Magjike with the song "Nëntori" in November 2016. The song subsequently experienced commercial success abroad, peaking at number one on the Romanian Radio and TV Airplay rankings as well as reaching number 3 in Bulgaria and number 38 in Hungary. In early 2017, the song's remixes, including "Nëntori (Bess Remix)" and "Nëntori (Beverly Pills Remix)", further reached the top 20 in the Commonwealth of Independent States (CIS). In the course of 2017, Ara performed at the Europa Plus Festival in Moscow, Russia, and won the award for the song of the year at the Astana Dausy Music Awards in Astana, Kazakhstan.

=== 2019–present: Pop Art and continued success ===
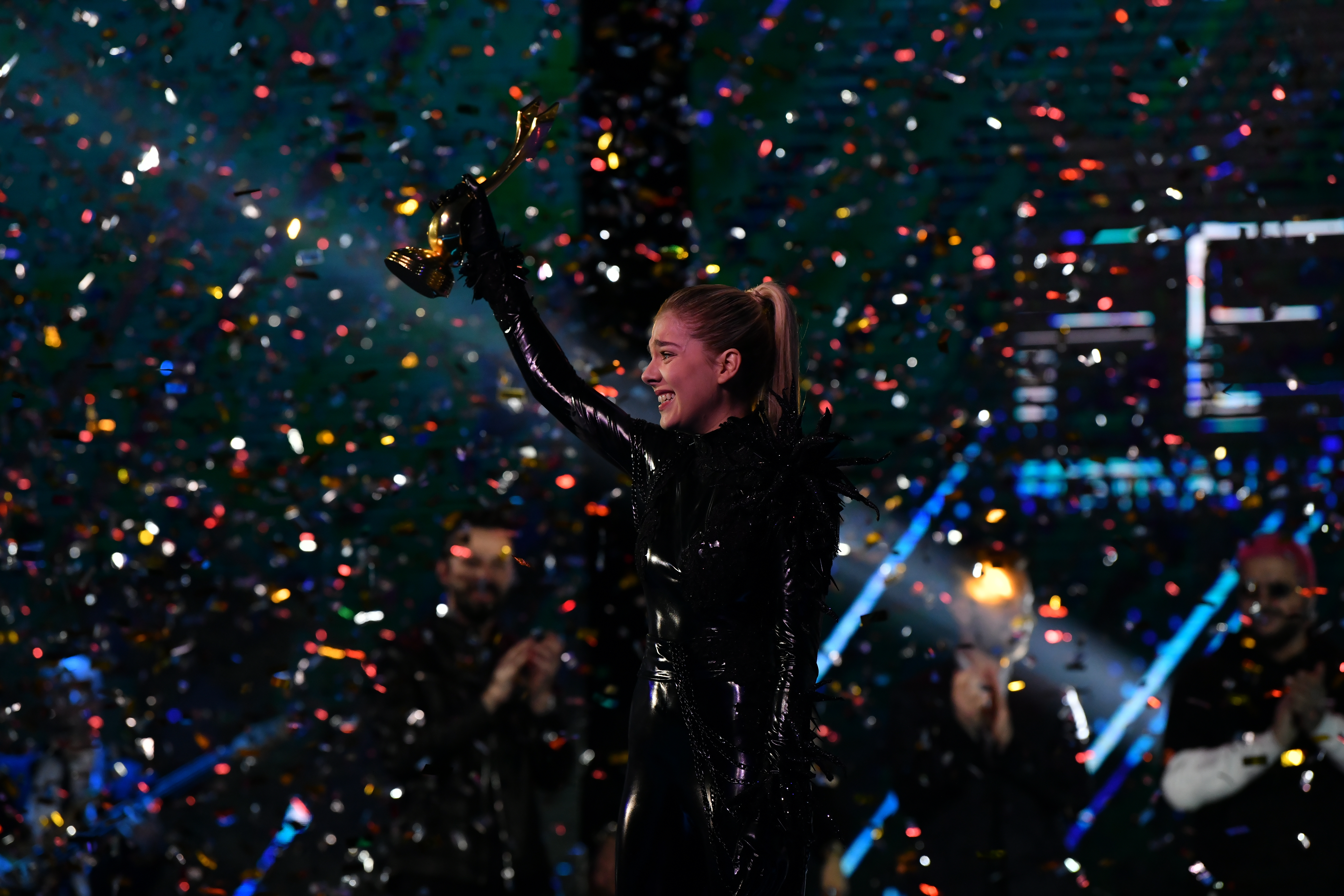
Arilena Ara after winning the 58th edition of Festivali i Këngës

As of 2019, Ara has been a juror for the third series of the singing show The Voice Kids Albania. After winning the 58th edition of the music contest Festivali i Këngës with the song "Shaj" in late December 2019, Radio Televizioni Shqiptar (RTSH) designated Ara as the Albanian representative for the Eurovision Song Contest 2020 in Rotterdam, the Netherlands. In February 2020, following several months spent in Los Angeles, the singer announced that she had started working on her debut studio album. In March 2020, due to the COVID-19 pandemic, the European Broadcasting Union (EBU) cancelled the Eurovision Song Contest 2020. After a short hiatus, she was featured on Albanian singer Alban Skënderaj's "A i sheh" in December 2020, which peaked at number 29 in Albania.

Ara released her debut studio album, Pop Art The Album, on 6 November 2021. Prior to its release, four singles, "Murderer", "Aligator", "Thirr Policinë" and "Ke me mungu", were released from the record. Containing R&B and hip hop music, "Murderer" featuring Albanian rapper Noizy was released as the record's lead single in July 2021. Its second single, "Aligator", followed on 9 August 2021 and peaked at number five in Albania. For the record's third single titled, "Thirr Policinë", the singer collaborated with Kosovo-Albanian musician Dafina Zeqiri and reached number six in Albania. Ara scored her first number-one single with "Ke me mungu" in October 2021. In April 2022, she debuted as a television presenter, hosting the investigative show Piranjat. On the fifth season of the singing show X Factor Albania was a Judge. Ara participated in Kënga Magjike 2024, duetting with Pirro Çako with their song "ZERO GRADË", later withdrawing from the competition for unknown reasons.

== Artistry ==
Ara names Michael Jackson as her major musical and artistic influence.

== Discography ==
=== Albums ===
- Pop Art The Album (2021)

=== Singles ===
==== As lead artist ====
List of singles as lead artist, with selected chart positions
Title	Year	Peak chart positions				Album
Title	Year	ALB	CIS	HUN	ROM	Album
"Aeroplan"	2014	—N/a	—	—	—	Non-album singles
"Business Class"	2014	—N/a	—	—	—	Non-album singles
"Vegim"	2015	—N/a	—	—	—	Non-album singles
"Toke Rroke"	2016	—	—	—	—	Non-album singles
"Nëntori"	2016	—	— (Note: "Nëntori" did not enter the Tophit chart but both official remixes, including "Nentori (Beverly Pills Remix)" and "Nentori (Bess Remix)", peaked at number 1 and 16, respectively, in the Commonwealth of Independent States.)	38	1	Non-album singles
"I'm Sorry"	2017	—	—	—	—	Non-album singles
"Snow in December"	2017	14	—	—	—	Non-album singles
"Silver and Gold"	2017	—	— (Note: "Silver and Gold" did not enter the Tophit chart but the official remix "Silver & Gold (Going Deeper Remix)" peaked at number 139 in Commonwealth of Independent States.)	—	—	Non-album singles
"Zemër"	2017	—	—	—	—	Non-album singles
"I'll Give You My Heart"	2018	—	—	—	—	Non-album singles
"Doja" (featuring Flori Mumajesi)	2019	—	—	—	—	Non-album singles
"Shaj"	2019	—	—	—	—	Non-album singles
"Fall from the Sky"	2020	—	—	—	—	Non-album singles
"Murderer" (featuring Noizy)	2021	—	—	—	—	Pop Art The Album
"Aligator"	2021	5	—	—	—	Pop Art The Album
"Thirr Policinë" (featuring Dafina Zeqiri)	2021	6	—	—	—	Pop Art The Album
"Ke me mungu"	2021	1	—	—	—	Pop Art The Album
"Dashuria ime"	2022	—	—	—	—	Non-album singles
"Zero Gradë"	2024	—	—	—	—	Non-album singles
"—" denotes a recording that did not chart or was not released in that territory.

==== As featured artist ====
List of singles as featured artist, with selected chart positions
Title	Year	Peak chart positions		Album
Title	Year	ALB	BUL	Album
"Nallane 3" (Flori Mumajesi featuring Arilena and Dj Vicky)	2017	—	—	Non-album single
"Last train to Paris" (KDDK featuring Arilena)	2018	32	1	Non-album single
"A i sheh" (Alban Skënderaj featuring Arilena)	2020	29	—	Non-album single
"—" denotes a recording that did not chart or was not released in that territory.

=== Other charted songs ===
List of other charted songs, with selected chart positions
Title	Year	Peak chart positions	Album
Title	Year	ALB	Album
"E gjallë"	2021	2	Pop Art The Album
"Dance Me" (featuring Gjon's Tears)	2021	10	Pop Art The Album
"—" denotes a recording that did not chart or was not released in that territory.

== See also ==
- List of awards and nominations received by Arilena Ara

== Notes ==
Awards and achievements
Preceded by Sheila Haxhiraj	X Factor Albania; Winner; 2013	Succeeded by Ergi Dini
Preceded by Jonida Maliqi	Festivali i Këngës; Winner; 2019	Succeeded by Anxhela Peristeri
Preceded by Jonida Maliqi with "Ktheju tokës"	Albania in the Eurovision Song Contest; 2020 (cancelled)	Succeeded by Anxhela Peristeri with "Karma"
