= Las Tunas (disambiguation) =

Las Tunas, originally named Victoria de Las Tunas, is a city in Cuba.

Las Tunas may also refer to:

Cuba:

- Las Tunas Province
- FC Las Tunas, a soccer club based in Las Tunas
- Leñadores de Las Tunas, baseball team in the Cuban National Series

Argentina:

- Las Tunas, Argentina, a locality in Santa Fe Province
- Las Tunas, near the Nordelta district of Buenos Aires Province
- Las Tunas, a locality in Entre Ríos Province

United States:

- Las Tunas, California, former settlement in Los Angeles County

== See also ==
- Tuna (disambiguation)
