= Nëntori =

2016 single by Arilena Ara

Single by Arilena Ara
- Released: 14 November 2016
- Length: 4:07
- Label: B1 Recordings; Effective Records
- Songwriter: Lindon Berisha
- Producer: Darko Dimitrov

Arilena Ara singles chronology
"Toke Rroke" (2016)	"Nëntori" (2016)	"I'm Sorry" (2017)

Music video
- "Nëntori" on YouTube

"Nëntori" (Albanian pronunciation: [nən'tɔɾi]; transl. "November") is a song by Albanian singer Arilena Ara. The song was entirely written by Albanian musician Lindon Berisha and produced by Macedonian producer Darko Dimitrov. It was primarily composed for Arilena's participation in the 18th edition of Kënga Magjike.

The song experienced commercial success in Romania peaking at number one on the country's Radio and TV Airplay Charts. Two remixed versions of the song by Bess and Beverly Pills respectively entered the charts in Russia and Ukraine. For further promotion, it was performed by the singer on various occasions among others in Albania, Kazakhstan, Romania, Russia and Ukraine.

== Background and composition ==
"Nëntori" was written by Albanian musician Lindon Berisha and produced by Macedonian producer Darko Dimitrov. Lasting four minutes and seven seconds, the song is a ballad which musically incorporates ethnic beats, oriental elements and violins in its instrumentation. It is lyrically about a love story between two separated people that reflects pain and tears.

== Promotion ==
An English version of "Nëntori" with the title "I'm Sorry", written by Menno Reyntjes, was premiered onto the YouTube channel of Arilena with an accompanying music video on 24 August 2017. For further promotion, Arilena performed the song in the Europa Plus Festival, Astana Dusy Festival and FIFA Fan Zone Moscow. She made further appearances to perform the song on Romanian radio station Radio ZU on 14 June 2017. On 15 December 2017, she was invited to perform the song in the grand final on the Romanian television talent show Voice of Romania.

== Kënga Magjike ==
The 18th edition of Kënga Magjike took place in Tirana, Albania, and consisted of two semi-finals held on 7 and 8 December, and the grand final on 10 December 2016. Arilena Ara, one of the contestants selected to compete in the competition, performed the song for the first time on 14 November 2016 as well as on 10 December 2016 after qualifying for the grand final. The song reached the third place in a field of twenty-one in the grand final on 10 December 2016 and won the nomination for the Best Ballad.

== Charts ==
=== Weekly charts ===
Weekly chart performance for "Nëntori"
Chart (2017–2025)	Peak position
Belarus Airplay (Eurofest)	10
Bulgaria International (PROPHON)	3
CIS Airplay (Tophit) Bess Remix	16
CIS Airplay (Tophit) Beverly Pills Remix	1
Hungary (Single Top 40)	38
Moldova Airplay (TopHit) Beverly Pills Remix	91
Romania (Airplay 100)	1
Romania Radio Airplay (Media Forest)	1
Romania TV Airplay (Media Forest)	1

=== Monthly charts ===
Monthly chart performance for "Nëntori"
Chart (2017)	Peak position
Russia Airplay (Tophit) Bess Remix	90
Russia Airplay (Tophit) Beverly Pills Remix	4
Ukraine Airplay (Tophit) Bess Remix	13
Ukraine Airplay (Tophit) Beverly Pills Remix	6

=== Year-end charts ===
Year-end chart performance for "Nëntori"
Chart (2017)	Position
CIS (Tophit) Bess Remix	127
CIS (Tophit) Beverly Pills Remix	26
Russia Airplay (Tophit) Bess Remix	192
Russia Airplay (Tophit) Beverly Pills Remix	31
Ukraine Airplay (Tophit) Bess Remix	58
Ukraine Airplay (Tophit) Beverly Pills Remix	32

== Release history ==
Release dates and formats for "Nëntori"
Region	Date	Format(s)	Label(s)	Ref.
Russia	24 January 2017	Digital download; streaming	Effective Records	
Various	2 June 2017	Digital download; streaming	B1 Recordings	

== See also ==
- List of Airplay 100 number ones of the 2010s
