= Tuning =

Tuning may refer to:

== Common uses ==
- Tuning, the process of tuning a tuned amplifier or other electronic component
- Musical tuning, musical systems of tuning, and the act of tuning an instrument or voice
  - Guitar tunings
  - Piano tuning, adjusting the pitch of pianos using a tuning fork or a frequency counter
- Neuronal tuning, the property of brain cells to selectively represent a particular kind of sensory, motor or cognitive information
- Radio tuning
- Performance tuning - the optimization of systems, especially computer systems, which may include:
  - Car tuning, an industry and hobby involving modifying automobile engines to improve their performance
    - Engine tuning, the adjustment, modification, or design of internal combustion engines to yield more performance
  - Computer hardware tuning
  - Database tuning
  - Self-tuning, a system capable of optimizing its own internal running parameters

== Arts, entertainment and media ==
- "Tuning", a song by Avail from their album Dixie (1994)
- Tuning, a psychokinetic ability in the film Dark City (1998)

== See also ==
- Tune up (disambiguation)
- Tune (disambiguation)
- Tuner (disambiguation)
