= Ktheju tokës =

2019 song by Jonida Maliqi

Single by Jonida Maliqi
- Language: Albanian
- Released: 8 March 2019
- Studio: Svenska Grammofonstudion, Gothenburg, Sweden
- Genre: Folk-electronic
- Length: 3:14
- Label: RTSH; Universal
- Songwriter: Eriona Rushiti
- Producer: Enis Mullaj

Jonida Maliqi singles chronology
"N'errësirë" (2018)	"Ktheju tokës" (2019)	"Need You" (2022)

Music video
- "Ktheju tokës" on YouTube

Eurovision Song Contest 2019 entry
- Country: Albania
- Artist: Jonida Maliqi
- Language: Albanian
- Composer: Eriona Rushiti
- Lyricist: Eriona Rushiti

Finals performance
- Semi-final result: 9th
- Semi-final points: 96
- Final result: 17th
- Final points: 90

Entry chronology
- ◄ "Mall" (2018)
- "Fall from the Sky" (2020) ►

"Ktheju tokës" (Albanian: [kθɛˈju ˈtɔˈkəs]; transl. Return to the land) is a song by Albanian singer Jonida Maliqi. It was released as a single on 8 March 2019 by Radio Televizioni Shqiptar (RTSH) and Universal. The song was composed and written by Eriona Rushiti, and produced by Enis Mullaj. It is musically an authentic and rhythmic Albanian-language folk-electronic ballad backed by traditional Albanian instruments. Lyrically, the song addresses the theme of migration, particularly to that of the Albanian people during the Kosovo War in the late 20th century.

The song represented Albania in the Eurovision Song Contest 2019 in Tel Aviv, Israel, after winning the country's pre-selection competition Festivali i Këngës. It eventually reached the seventeenth place in a field of twenty six, gathering a total of ninety points and marking the fourth year for Albania to achieve the same result. During Maliqi's black and red-toned performance, she was accompanied by three backing vocalists, while the background LED screens prominently displayed a flying eagle and its nest.

"Ktheju tokës" was positively received by music critics who praised Maliqi's vocals, the song's composition as well as its ethnic appeal. An accompanying music video premiered on the official YouTube channel of the Eurovision Song Contest on 10 March 2019. It portrays Maliqi singing the song in smoke and rain, with scenes of two children running, one across the water, and one escaping from the flames. For promotional purposes, she made various appearances to perform the song in Amsterdam, London and Madrid.

== Background and composition ==
"Ktheju tokës" was composed and written by Eriona Rushiti, and produced by Enis Mullaj along Sokol Marsi for Jonida Maliqi's participation in the 57th edition of Festivali i Këngës, a competition for determining Albania's participant for the Eurovision Song Contest 2019. It was recorded and remastered at Svenska Grammofonstudion in Gothenburg, Sweden. The song has been described as a rhythmic Albanian-language folk-electronic spiritual and dramatic ballad backed by traditional Albanian instruments consisting of a fyell, lahuta and tupan. Lyrically, "Ktheju tokës" explores the theme of migration particularly that of the Albanian people during the 1990s as a part of the Kosovo War and also alludes to the continuous migration crisis around the world.

== Critical reception ==
Upon its victory at Festivali i Këngës, "Ktheju tokës" was generally met with positive reviews from music critics. In a Wiwibloggs review containing several reviews from individual critics, including Robyn Gallagher and Deban Aderemi, Maliqi's vocal delivery and the song's production as well as its authenticity were praised, while being labeled as "organic" and "alluring". Overall, the reviewers of the website gave the song 7.17 out of total 10 points. Emma Kelly, writing for Metro, was additionally positive towards the song's composition and the singer's vocal performance, while lauding that she chose to keep the Albanian-language lyrics instead of translating the song to English.

== Music video and promotion ==
A screenshot of the "dark" and "dramatic" music video, showcasing Jonida Maliqi in front of a black backdrop with white smoke slowly moving across her.

An accompanying music video for "Ktheju tokës" premiered on the official YouTube channel of the Eurovision Song Contest on 10 March 2019. Its filming process started in early March 2019 and was organised by Triangle Media Group in Tirana, Albania. Described as dark and dramatic, it prominently features scenes of Maliqi performing the song in front of a smoke-filled black backdrop and prior to the end, in the rain. Interspersed shots through the main plot portray two children running separately, one across the water and the other escaping from the flames, symbolising the message of the song.

For promotional purposes, she made various live performances at multiple events, including in Amsterdam, London and Madrid. In March 2019, she appeared to perform a special version of the song live on the Albanian television show The Voice Kids. Outside the promotional phase, she opened the first semi-final of the 58th edition of Festivali i Këngës. Beside that, the song was featured at number 40 on the 2019 edition of the Eurovision Top 250 chart.

== At Eurovision ==
=== Festivali i Këngës ===
The national broadcaster, Radio Televizioni Shqiptar (RTSH), organised the 57th edition of Festivali i Këngës to determine the Albania's participant for the Eurovision Song Contest 2019 in Tel Aviv, Israel. It opened a submission period for artists, bands and composers to submit their entries between 16 May and 30 September 2018 to the broadcaster, during which 54 entries were received. A jury panel, consisting of music professionals, reviewed the received submissions and eventually revealed their 22 semi-finalists on 17 October 2018. During the second semi-final, Jonida Maliqi qualified for the grand final and was then chosen to represent the country in the contest.

=== Tel Aviv ===
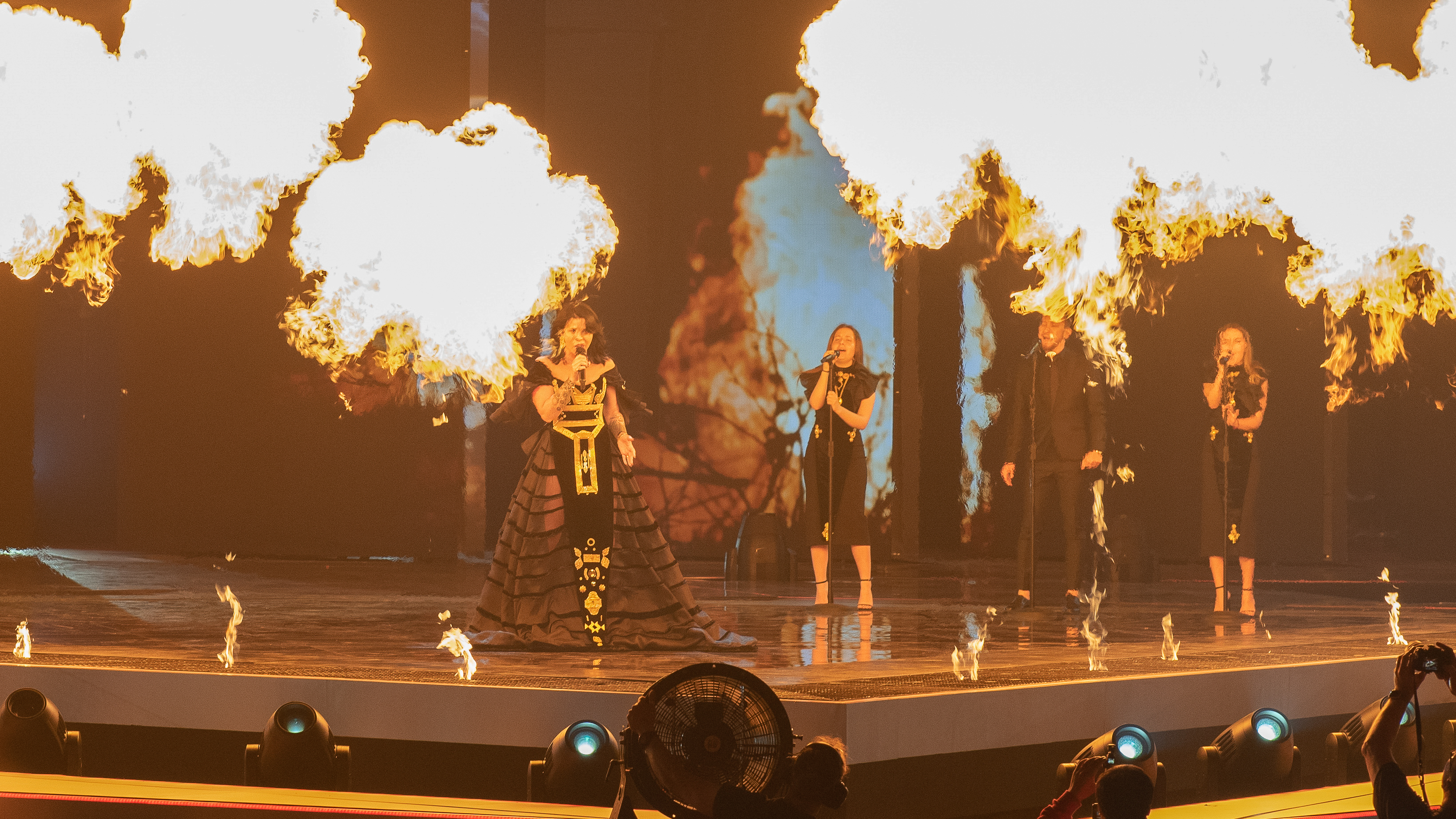
Jonida Maliqi performing during a rehearsal. She wore a full-length black gown decorated with filigree and ancient Illyrian symbols.

The 64th edition of the Eurovision Song Contest took place in Tel Aviv, Israel, and consisted of two semi-finals held on 14 and 16 May, and the grand final on 18 May 2019. According to the Eurovision rules, each participating country, except the host country and the "Big Five", consisting of France, Germany, Italy, Spain and the United Kingdom, were required to qualify from one of the two semi-finals to compete for the grand final, although, the top ten countries from the respective semi-final progress to the grand final. On 28 January 2019, it was announced that Albania would be performing in the second half of the second semi-final of the contest.

During the second semi-final, Albania performed fourteenth, following Russia and preceding Norway, and qualified for the grand final in ninth place with 96 points, ranking twelfth by the jury's 38 points and ninth by the televote of 58 points. At the grand final, the country performed second, following Malta and preceding the Czech Republic. Albania finished in the seventeenth place in a field of twenty six with 90 total points, ranking seventeenth by the jury's 43 points as well as seventeenth by the televote of 47 points.

Maliqi's Albanian-themed performance commences with her singing the song in front of dark coloured LED screens enhanced by black, red and white lights. She wore a full-length black gown decorated with gold accents inspired by ancient Illyrian symbols. Graphics of burning fire, rain and various dark images were displayed during the rest of the performance, and near the end, a nest and a flying eagle is depicted. The graphics constitute as the representatives of the song's lyrics, reflecting the Albanian-themed migration that is discussed in them. Before the final performances, technical rehearsals for the song were held at Expo Tel Aviv on 7 May and 11 May 2019.

== Personnel ==
Credits adapted from Tidal.

- Jonida Maliqi – performing, vocals
- Eriona Rushiti – composing, songwriting
- Enis Mulla – producing, pianist
- Sokol Marsi – producing
- Artemisa Mithi – background vocals
- Bledi Polena – background vocals
- Tahir Gjoci – background vocals, bass and electric guitarist
- Wendi Mancaku – background vocals
- Eldi Smaja – drummer
- Andrew Walter – mastering
- Thomas Juth – engineering, mixing

== Track listing ==
- Digital download
1. "Ktheju tokës" – 3:14
- Digital downloads
1. "Ktheju tokës" – 3:05
2. "Ktheju tokës" (Karaoke Version) – 3:05

== Release history ==
Region	Date	Format(s)	Label	Ref.
Various	8 March 2019	Digital download; streaming	RTSH; Universal	
Various	15 March 2019	Digital download; streaming	RTSH; Universal	
