= X Factor (Albanian TV series) season 2 =

X Factor
- Season 2
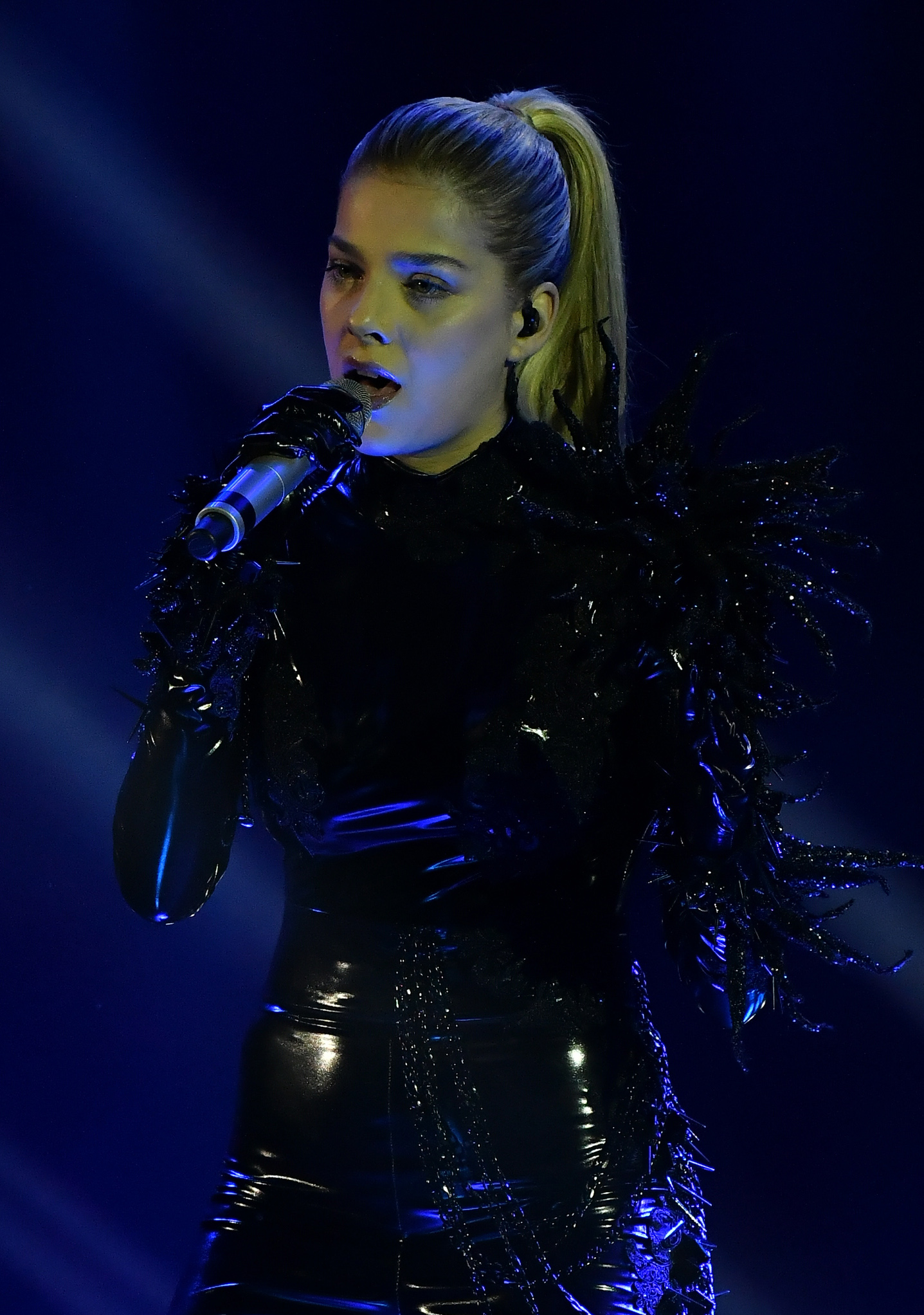
- Arilena Ara in 2019.
- Hosted by: Alketa Vejsiu
- Judges: Pandi Laço; Altuna Sejdiu; Soni Malaj; Alban Skënderaj
- Winner: Arilena Ara
- Runner-up: Aldo Bardhi

Release
- Original network: Klan Television
- Original release: 28 October 2012 – 31 March 2013

Season chronology
- ← Previous; Season 1 Next → Season 3

X Factor is an Albanian television music competition to find new singing talents. The second season began on 28 October 2012 on TV Klan.

Based on the British format, the competition consists of auditions, in front of producers and then the judges with a live audience; bootcamp; judges' houses and then the live finals. Auditions for the show began in August and concluded in September 2011. The show is hosted by Albanian singer Alketa Vejsiu, while the judging panel consists of the biggest Albanian artists. Albanian famous writer, composer and TV presenter Pandi Laço, Albanian Macedonian pop singer Altuna Sejdiu, Soni Malaj and the Albanian superstar Alban Skënderaj. The season was won by Arilena Ara of the Girls category.

== Judges ==
This year, Juliana Pasha and Vesa Luma were replaced by the new judges, Altuna Sejdiu and Soni Malaj. The reason that Pasha and Luma did not continue their mentoring job, was generally due to their music commitment. Altuna Sejdiu, the new judge, was a part of last year's X Factor auditions in Tirana, replacing Vesa Luma. After the withdrawal of Pasha and Luma, it was rumoured that Altuna Sejdiu will be a part of the show. Together with her, Kosovo-based Albanian singer, Eliza Hoxha was also rumoured to be a judge. However, a few days before the show aired, TV Klan held a press conference explaining the procedure and the new judges. Bojken Lako was also a guest-judge in the auditions.

== Judges' houses ==
The 13 eliminated acts were:

- Boys: Amadeo Gjura, Bekim Elezi, Enur Pakashtica, Xhustino Hasani
- Girls: Daniela Kola, Ersona Cakaj, Sanja Fajkoja, Silvana Rusi
- Over 23s: Arta Selimi, Francesko Methoxha
- Groups: Crazy Mix, Rapsodi, The Extrems

After the judges' houses stage, Arilena Ara and Kanita Suma were put into the live shows as wildcards.

== Contestants ==
The top 18 contestants were confirmed as follows;

Key:

– Winner
– Runner-up

Category (mentor)	Acts				
Boys (Malaj)	Aldo Bardhi	Herri Beluli	Petro Xhori	Sardi Strugaj	
Girls (Sejdiu)	Antonela Çekixhi	Arilena Ara	Elisa Salla	Shkelqesa Sadiku	Xhina Kelmendi
No Limit (Laço)	Egzona Ademi	Ina Torba	Kanita Suma	Rezart Saliasi	Suela Malasi
Groups (Skënderaj)	Foxy Ladies	KSAL	Natyral	Soul Sisters	

== Live shows ==
=== Results summary ===
Color key

–	Contestant was in the bottom two/three and had to sing again in the final showdown
–	Contestant was in the bottom three but received the fewest votes and was immediately eliminated
–	Contestant received the most public votes

Weekly results per contestant
Contestant	Week 1	Week 2	Week 3	Week 4	Week 5	Week 6	Week 7	Week 8	Week 9	Week 10	Week 11	Week 12	Week 13	Week 14	Week 15	Week 16	
Contestant	Week 1	Week 2	Week 3	Week 4	Week 5	Week 6	Week 7	Week 8	Week 9	Week 10	Week 11	Week 12	Week 13	Week 14	Week 15	Round One	Round Two
Arilena Ara	Safe	Safe	Safe	Safe	Safe	Safe	Safe	Safe	Safe	Safe	Safe	Safe	Safe	Safe	Safe	Safe	Winner (week 16)
Aldo Bardhi	Safe	Safe	Safe	Safe	Safe	Safe	Safe	Safe	Safe	Safe	Safe	Safe	Bottom two	Safe	3rd	Safe	Runner-Up (week 16)
Natyral	Safe	Safe	Safe	Safe	Safe	Safe	Safe	Safe	Safe	Bottom two	Safe	Safe	Safe	Safe	Safe	3rd	Eliminated (week 16)
Kanita Suma	Safe	Safe	Safe	Safe	Safe	Safe	Safe	Safe	Safe	Safe	Safe	Safe	Safe	4th	4th	Eliminated (week 15)	
Antonela Çekixhi	Safe	Safe	Safe	Safe	Safe	Safe	Safe	Safe	Bottom two	Safe	Safe	Bottom two	Safe	5th	Eliminated (week 14)		
KSAL	Safe	Safe	Safe	Safe	Safe	Safe	Safe	Safe	Safe	Safe	7th	Safe	Bottom two	Eliminated (week 13)			
Sardi Strugaj	Safe	Safe	Safe	Safe	Safe	12th	Safe	Safe	Safe	Safe	Safe	Bottom two	Eliminated (week 12)				
Egzona Ademi	Safe	Safe	Safe	Safe	Safe	Safe	Safe	Safe	Safe	Safe	8th	Eliminated (week 11)					
Soul Sisters	Safe	Safe	Safe	Safe	Safe	Safe	11th	Safe	Safe	Bottom two	Eliminated (week 10)						
Petro Xhori	Safe	Safe	Safe	Safe	Safe	Safe	Safe	Bottom two	Bottom two	Eliminated (week 9)							
Elisa Salla	Safe	Safe	Safe	Bottom two	Safe	Safe	Safe	Bottom two	Eliminated (week 8)								
Xhina Kelmendi	Safe	Safe	Safe	Safe	Safe	Safe	12th	Eliminated (week 7)									
Herri Beluli	Safe	Safe	Safe	Safe	Bottom two	13th	Eliminated (week 6)										
Suela Malasi	Safe	Safe	Safe	Safe	Bottom two	Eliminated (week 5)											
Shkelqesa Sadiku	Safe	Bottom two	Safe	Bottom two	Eliminated (week 4)												
Foxy Ladies	Bottom three	Bottom two	Eliminated (week 2)														
Ina Torba	Bottom three	Eliminated (week 1)															
Rezart Saliasi	18th	Eliminated (week 1)															
Final showdown	Foxy Ladies; Ina Torba	Foxy Ladies; Shkelqesa Sadiku		Elisa Salla; Shkelqesa Sadiku	Herri Beluli; Suela Malasi	Herri Beluli; Sardi Strugaj	Soul Sisters; Xhina Kelmendi	Elisa Salla; Petro Xhori	Antonela Çekixhi; Petro Xhori	Natyral; Soul Sisters	Egzona Ademi; KSAL	Antonela Çekixhi; Sardi Strugaj	Aldo Bardhi; KSAL	Antonela Çekixhi; Kanita Suma	Aldo Bardhi; Kanita Suma	No final showdown or judges' vote: results are based on public votes alone	
Judges voted to eliminate:	Eliminate															No final showdown or judges' vote: results are based on public votes alone	
Skënderaj's vote to eliminate:	Ina Torba	Shkelqesa Sadiku	—N/a	—N/a	Suela Malasi	Herri Beluli	Xhina Kelmendi	Elisa Salla	Petro Xhori	Soul Sisters	Egzona Ademi	Sardi Strugaj	Aldo Bardhi	Kanita Suma	Kanita Suma	No final showdown or judges' vote: results are based on public votes alone	
Sejdiu's vote to eliminate:	Ina Torba	Foxy Ladies	—N/a	Shkelqesa Sadiku	Suela Malasi	Sardi Strugaj	Soul Sisters	Petro Xhori	Petro Xhori	Soul Sisters	Egzona Ademi	Sardi Strugaj	KSAL	Kanita Suma	Aldo Bardhi	No final showdown or judges' vote: results are based on public votes alone	
Malaj's vote to eliminate:	Ina Torba	Foxy Ladies	—N/a	Shkelqesa Sadiku	Suela Malasi	Sardi Strugaj	Xhina Kelemendi	Elisa Salla	Antonela Çekixhi	Soul Sisters	KSAL	Antonela Çekixhi	KSAL	Antonela Çekixhi	Kanita Suma	No final showdown or judges' vote: results are based on public votes alone	
Laço's vote to eliminate:	Foxy Ladies	Foxy Ladies	—N/a	Shkelqesa Sadiku	Herri Beluli	Herri Beluli	Soul Sisters	Elisa Salla	Petro Xhori	—N/a	KSAL	Sardi Strugaj	KSAL	Antonela Çekixhi	Aldo Bardhi	No final showdown or judges' vote: results are based on public votes alone	
Eliminated	Rezart Saliasi; Public Vote	Foxy Ladies; 3 of 4 votes Majority	None	Shkelqesa Sadiku; 3 of 4 votes Majority	Suela Malasi; 3 of 4 votes Majority	Herri Beluli; 2 of 4 votes Deadlock	Xhina Kelmendi; 2 of 4 votes Deadlock	Elisa Salla; 3 of 4 votes Majority	Petro Xhori; 3 of 4 votes Majority	Soul Sisters; 3 of 4 votes Majority	Egzona Ademi; 2 of 4 votes Deadlock	Sardi Strugaj; 3 of 4 votes Majority	KSAL; 3 of 4 votes Majority	Antonela Çekixhi; 2 of 4 votes Deadlock	Kanita Suma; 2 of 4 votes Deadlock	Natyral; Third Place	Aldo Bardhi; Runner-Up
Eliminated	Ina Torba; 3 of 4 votes Majority	Foxy Ladies; 3 of 4 votes Majority	None	Shkelqesa Sadiku; 3 of 4 votes Majority	Suela Malasi; 3 of 4 votes Majority	Herri Beluli; 2 of 4 votes Deadlock	Xhina Kelmendi; 2 of 4 votes Deadlock	Elisa Salla; 3 of 4 votes Majority	Petro Xhori; 3 of 4 votes Majority	Soul Sisters; 3 of 4 votes Majority	Egzona Ademi; 2 of 4 votes Deadlock	Sardi Strugaj; 3 of 4 votes Majority	KSAL; 3 of 4 votes Majority	Antonela Çekixhi; 2 of 4 votes Deadlock	Kanita Suma; 2 of 4 votes Deadlock	Natyral; Third Place	Arilena Ara; Winner

=== Live show details ===
==== Week 1 (16 December 2012) ====
Contestants' performances on the first live show
Act	Order	Song	Result
Soul Sisters	1	"Purple Rain"	Safe
Elisa Salla	2	"All I Could Do Was Cry"	Safe
Sardi Strugaj	3	"Here Without You"	Safe
Kanita Suma	4	"Someone like You"	Safe
Arilena Ara	5	"Man Down"	Safe
KSAL	6	"Beggin'"	Safe
Ina Torba	7	"The Boy Does Nothing"	Bottom three
Petro Xhori	8	"Callin' U"	Safe
Rezart Saliasi	9	"Boulevard of Broken Dreams"	Eliminated
Shkelqesa Sadiku	10	"Beautiful"	Safe
Suela Malasi	11	"We Are"	Safe
Aldo Bardhi	12	"I Believe I Can Fly"	Safe
Foxy Ladies	13	"Just Dance"	Bottom three
Xhina Kelmendi	14	"Love You Like a Love Song"	Safe
Herri Beluli	15	"It's a Man's Man's Man's World"	Safe
Egzona Ademi	16	"You Know I'm No Good"	Safe
Antonela Çekixhi	17	"Proud Mary"	Safe
Natyral	18	"End of Time"	Safe
Final showdown details
Ina Torba	1	"You Lost Me"	Eliminated
Foxy Ladies	2	"DNA"	Safe

Judges' votes to eliminate

- Alban Skenderaj: Ina Torba
- Pandi Laço: Foxy Ladies
- Altuna Sejdiu: Ina Torba
- Soni Malaj: Ina Torba

==== Week 2 (23 December 2012) ====
Contestants' performances on the second live show
Act	Order	Song	Result
Natyral	1	"All I Want for Christmas Is You"	Safe
Arilena Ara	2	"Walking on Sunshine"	Safe
Petro Xhori	3	"Jingle Bells"	Safe
Elisa Salla	4	"We Will Rock You"/"The Show Must Go On"	Safe
KSAL	5	"What Goes Around... Comes Around"	Safe
Shkelqesa Sadiku	6	"Firework"	Bottom two
Kanita Suma	7	"Hallelujah"	Safe
Suela Malasi	8	"Rockin' Around the Christmas Tree"	Safe
Xhina Kelmendi	9	"Kiss Me"	Safe
Foxy Ladies	10	"Buttons"	Bottom two
Herri Beluli	11	"This Christmas"	Safe
Sardi Strugaj	12	"Eye of the Tiger"	Safe
Soul Sisters	13	"Crazy"	Safe
Aldo Bardhi	14	"Silent Night"	Safe
Antonela Çekixhi	15	"Man! I Feel Like a Woman!"	Safe
Egzona Ademi	16	"Amazing Grace"	Safe
Final showdown details
Shkelqesa Sadiku	1	"Suus"	Safe
Foxy Ladies	2	"Black Heart"	Eliminated

Judges' votes to eliminate

- Pandi Laço: Foxy Ladies
- Alban Skënderaj: Shkelqesa Sadiku
- Altuna Sejdiu: Foxy Ladies
- Soni Malaj: Foxy Ladies

==== Week 3 (1 January 2013) ====
Contestants' performances on the third live show
Act	Order	Song	Result
Arilena Ara	1	"It's Raining Men"	Safe
Herri Beluli	2	"Wild World"	Safe
Soul Sisters	3	"Respect"	Safe
Kanita Suma	4	"Nobody's Perfect"	Safe
Egzona Ademi	5	"Big Spender"	Safe
Shkelqesa Sadiku	6	"At Last"	Safe
Suela Malasi	7	"Hot Stuff"	Safe
Natyral	8	"Roc' the Life"	Safe
Xhina Kelmendi	9	"My Only Wish (This Year)"	Safe
Sardi Strugaj	10	"Run Rudolph Run"	Safe
KSAL	11	"Your Song"	Safe
Petro Xhori	12	"Pop"	Safe
Elisa Salla	13	"River Deep – Mountain High"	Safe
Aldo Bardhi	14	"Read All About It"	Safe
Antonela Çekixhi	15	"I Will Follow Him"	Safe
No Final Showdown

==== Week 4 (6 January 2013) ====
Contestants' performances on the fourth live show
Act	Order	Song	Result
Soul Sisters	1	"One"	Safe
Xhina Kelmendi	2	"Skinny Love"	Safe
Petro Xhori	3	"Airplanes"	Safe
Shkelqesa Sadiku	4	"Perfect"	Bottom two
Aldo Bardhi	5	"When I Get You Alone"	Safe
Kanita Suma	6	"Girl on Fire"	Safe
Suela Malasi	7	"Sober"	Safe
Antonela Çekixhi	8	"Survivor"	Safe
Herri Beluli	9	"I Don't Want to Miss a Thing"	Safe
Natyral	10	"Another Way to Die"	Safe
Elisa Salla	11	"I Have Nothing"	Bottom two
Egzona Ademi	12	"Perhaps, Perhaps, Perhaps"	Safe
KSAL	13	"Rule the World"	Safe
Arilena Ara	14	"Always"	Safe
Sardi Strugaj	15	"We Could Be the Same"	Safe
Final showdown details
Shkelqesa Sadiku	1	"Euphoria"	Eliminated
Elisa Salla	2	"Lovin' You"	Safe

Judges' votes to eliminate

- Altuna Sejdiu: Shkelqesa Sadiku
- Soni Malaj: Shkelqesa Sadiku
- Pandi Laço: Shkelqesa Sadiku
- Alban Skenderaj: It was not necessary to vote for Shkelqesa already had the votes necessary for elimination.

==== Week 5 (13 January 2013) ====
Contestants' performances on the fifth live show
Act	Order	Song	Result
Natyral	1	"One and Only"	Safe
Arilena Ara	2	"Satellite"	Safe
Egzona Ademi	3	"Ancora ancora ancora"	Safe
Aldo Bardhi	4	"Impossible"	Safe
Xhina Kelmendi	5	"Hey There Delilah"	Safe
Soul Sisters	6	"Total Eclipse of the Heart"	Safe
Herri Beluli	7	"Diamonds"	Bottom two
Suela Malasi	8	"Black Velvet"	Bottom two
Sardi Strugaj	9	"Hard Rock Hallelujah"	Safe
Elisa Salla	10	"Stop!"	Safe
Kanita Suma	11	"Valsi i lumturisë"	Safe
Petro Xhori	12	"Bleeding Love"	Safe
KSAL	13	"Show Me the Meaning of Being Lonely"	Safe
Antonela Çekixhi	14	"The Best"	Safe
Final showdown details
Herri Beluli	1	"Sleepwalker"	Safe
Suela Malasi	2	"Karma"	Eliminated

Judges' votes to eliminate

- Soni Malaj: Suela Malasi
- Pandi Laço: Herri Beluli
- Alban Skenderaj: Suela Malasi
- Altuna Sejdiu: Suela Malasi

==== Week 6 (20 January 2013) ====
Contestants' performances on the sixth live show
Act	Order	Song	Result
Soul Sisters	1	"Do You Love Me"	Safe
Egzona Ademi	2	"Family Portrait"	Safe
Arilena Ara	3	"Titanium"	Safe
Kanita Suma	4	"Russian Roulette"	Safe
Sardi Strugaj	5	"I Don't Want to Talk About It"	Bottom two
Elisa Salla	6	"Bound to You"	Safe
Natyral	7	"We Are Young"	Safe
Xhina Kelmendi	8	"Soon We'll Be Found"	Safe
Petro Xhori	9	"4 Minutes"	Safe
Herri Beluli	10	"Shpirti im Binjak"	Bottom two
Aldo Bardhi	11	"Hello"	Safe
Antonela Çekixhi	12	"Dirty Diana"	Safe
KSAL	13	"Gambling Man"	Safe
Final showdown details
Sardi Strugaj	1	"Smells Like Teen Spirit"	Safe
Herri Beluli	2	"Whataya Want from Me"	Eliminated

Judges' votes to eliminate

- Pandi Laço: Herri Beluli
- Altuna Sejdiu: Sardi Strugaj
- Alban Skenderaj: Herri Beluli
- Soni Malaj: Sardi Strugaj

==== Week 7 (27 January 2013) ====
Contestants' performances on the seventh live show
Act	Order	Song	Result
Petro Xhori	1	"Tonight (I'm Lovin' You)"	Safe
Kanita Suma	2	"Because You Loved Me"	Safe
KSAL	3	"As Long as You Love Me"	Safe
Elisa Salla	4	"Je suis malade"	Safe
Arilena Ara	5	"Broken-Hearted Girl"	Safe
Soul Sisters	6	"Breathe Easy"	Bottom two
Xhina Kelmendi	7	"Monday Morning"	Bottom two
Aldo Bardhi	8	"Et si tu n'existais pas"	Safe
Egzona Ademi	9	"GoldenEye"	Safe
Natyral	10	"Where Have You Been"	Safe
Antonela Çekixhi	11	"You Lost Me"	Safe
Sardi Strugaj	12	"You Give Love a Bad Name"	Safe
Final showdown details
Xhina Kelmendi	1	"The A Team"	Eliminated
Soul Sisters	2	"I Will Always Love You"	Safe

Judges' votes to eliminate

- Alban Skenderaj: Xhina Kelmendi
- Altuna Sejdiu: Soul Sisters
- Soni Malaj: Xhina Kelmendi
- Pandi Laço: Soul Sisters

==== Week 8 (3 February 2013) ====
Contestants' performances on the eighth live show
Act	Order	Song	Result
Soul Sisters	1	"I Will Survive"/"Survivor"	Safe
Antonela Çekixhi	2	"Something's Got a Hold on Me"	Safe
Petro Xhori	3	"Ain't No Sunshine"	Bottom two
Kanita Suma	4	"Because of You"	Safe
Elisa Salla	5	"My Heart Is Refusing Me"	Bottom two
Sardi Strugaj	6	"I Don't Want to Be"	Safe
Natyral	7	"If I Ain't Got You"	Safe
Aldo Bardhi	8	"Battle Scars"	Safe
Egzona Ademi	9	"Nobody's Wife"	Safe
Arilena Ara	10	"Wild Dances"	Safe
KSAL	11	"Jailhouse Rock"	Safe
Final showdown details
Petro Xhori	1	"Fire"	Safe
Elisa Salla	2	"I See You"	Eliminated

Judges' votes to eliminate

- Soni Malaj: Elisa Salla
- Altuna Sejdiu: Petro Xhori
- Alban Skenderaj: Elisa Salla
- Pandi Laço: Elisa Salla

==== Week 9 (10 February 2013) ====
Contestants' performances on the ninth live show
Act	Order	Song	Result
Natyral	1	"You're the One That I Want"	Safe
Aldo Bardhi	2	"It Will Rain"	Safe
Kanita Suma	3	"Oh Mother"	Safe
Egzona Ademi	4	"Sweet Dreams"/"Sweet Dreams (Are Made of This)"	Safe
Soul Sisters	5	"Without You"	Safe
Petro Xhori	6	"Bye Bye Bye"	Bottom two
KSAL	7	"Hero"	Safe
Antonela Çekixhi	8	"Think"	Bottom two
Arilena Ara	9	"Jar of Hearts"	Safe
Sardi Strugaj	10	"Everybody Needs Somebody to Love"	Safe
Final showdown details
Petro Xhori	1	"Wherever You Will Go"	Eliminated
Antonela Çekixhi	2	"Mamma Knows Best"	Safe

Judges' votes to eliminate

- Soni Malaj: Antonela Çekixhi
- Altuna Sejdiu: Petro Xhori
- Pandi Laço: Petro Xhori
- Alban Skenderaj: Petro Xhori

==== Week 10 (17 February 2013) ====
Contestants' performances on the tenth live show
Act	Order	Song	Result
KSAL	1	"Breathing"	Safe
Arilena Ara	2	"Objection (Tango)"	Safe
Sardi Strugaj	3	"Sex on Fire"	Safe
Kanita Suma	4	"Eyes on me"	Safe
Antonela Çekixhi	5	"All the Man That I Need"	Safe
Soul Sisters	6	"Rumour Has It"/"Someone Like You"	Bottom two
Natyral	7	"Free Your Mind"	Bottom two
Egzona Ademi	8	"All That Jazz"	Safe
Aldo Bardhi	9	"When a Man Loves a Woman"	Safe
Final showdown details
Soul Sisters	1	"All by Myself"	Eliminated
Natyral	2	"My Kind of Love"	Safe

Judges' votes to eliminate

- Alban Skenderaj: Soul Sisters
- Altuna Sejdiu: Soul Sisters
- Soni Malaj: Soul Sisters
- Pandi Laço: It was not necessary to vote for Soul Sisters already had the votes necessary for elimination.

==== Week 11 (24 February 2013) ====
Contestants' performances on the eleventh live show
Act	Order	Song	Result
Sardi Strugaj	1	"You Can Leave Your Hat On"	Safe
Egzona Ademi	2	"Margherita"	Bottom two
Kanita Suma	3	"Fallin'"	Safe
KSAL	4	"Apologize"	Bottom two
Antonela Çekixhi	5	"Earth Song"	Safe
Arilena Ara	6	"Stay"	Safe
Natyral	7	"Let It Be"	Safe
Aldo Bardhi	8	"Runaway Baby"	Safe
Final showdown details
Egzona Ademi	1	"Hurt"	Eliminated
KSAL	2	"Incomplete"	Safe

Judges' votes to eliminate

- Alban Skenderaj: Egzona Ademi
- Pandi Laço: KSAL
- Altuna Sejdiu: Egzona Ademi
- Soni Malaj: KSAL

==== Week 12 (3 March 2013) ====
Contestants' performances on the twelfth live show
Act	Order	Song	Result
Kanita Suma	1	"Price Tag"	Safe
Aldo Bardhi	2	"The Big Bang"	Safe
Sardi Strugaj	3	"Break On Through (To the Other Side)"	Bottom two
KSAL	4	"Umbrella"	Safe
Arilena Ara	5	"She Said"	Safe
Antonela Çekixhi	6	"And I Am Telling You I'm Not Going"	Bottom two
Natyral	7	"Single Ladies (Put a Ring on It)"	Safe
Final showdown details
Sardi Strugaj	1	"Somebody Told Me"	Eliminated
Antonela Çekixhi	2	"Love on Top"	Safe

Judges' votes to eliminate

- Altuna Sejdiu: Sardi Strugaj
- Soni Malaj: Antonela Çekixhi
- Alban Skenderaj: Sardi Strugaj
- Pandi Laço: Sardi Strugaj

==== Week 13 (10 March 2013) ====
Contestants' performances on the thirteenth live show
Act	Order	Song	Result
KSAL	1	"Hot n Cold"	Bottom two
Antonela Çekixhi	2	"New York, New York"	Safe
Aldo Bardhi	3	"Halo"	Bottom two
Kanita Suma	4	"Don't You Remember"	Safe
Arilena Ara	5	"Written in the Stars"	Safe
Natyral	6	"The Voice Within"	Safe
Final showdown details
KSAL	1	"Sweet Home Chicago"	Eliminated
Aldo Bardhi	2	"Bound to You"	Safe

Judges' votes to eliminate

- Soni Malaj: KSAL
- Alban Skenderaj: Aldo Bardhi
- Pandi Laço: KSAL
- Altuna Sejdiu: KSAL

==== Week 14 (17 March 2013) ====
Contestants' performances on the fourteenth live show
Act	Order	First song	Order	Second song	Result
Antonela Çekixhi	1	"Lady Marmalade"	6	"Listen"	Bottom two
Natyral	2	"(You Make Me Feel Like) A Natural Woman"	7	"Flashdance... What a Feeling"	Safe
Aldo Bardhi	3	"When I Was Your Man"	8	"One Way or Another"	Safe
Kanita Suma	4	"I Will Love Again"	9	"My Immortal"	Bottom two
Arilena Ara	5	"Alone"	10	"Billie Jean"	Safe
Final showdown details
Antonela Çekixhi	1	"Who You Are"			Eliminated
Kanita Suma	2	"If I Were a Boy"			Safe

Judges' votes to eliminate

- Soni Malaj: Antonela Çekixhi
- Alban Skenderaj: Kanita Suma
- Pandi Laço: Antonela Çekixhi
- Altuna Sejdiu: Kanita Suma

==== Week 15 (24 March 2013) ====
Contestants' performances on the fifteenth live show
Act	Order	First song	Order	Second song	Result
Arilena Ara	1	"Try"	5	"Addicted to Love" (with Juliana Pasha)	Safe
Kanita Suma	2	"My Kind of Love"	6	"My Heart Will Go On" (with Olta Boka)	Bottom two
Aldo Bardhi	3	"Georgia on My Mind"	7	"Unfaithful" (with Sheila Haxhiraj)	Bottom two
Natyral	4	"The Silence"	8	"" (with Ardit Gjebrea)	Safe
Final showdown details
Kanita Suma	1	""			Eliminated
Aldo Bardhi	2	"Impossible"			Safe

Judges' votes to eliminate

- Pandi Laço: Aldo Bardhi
- Soni Malaj: Kanita Suma
- Alban Skenderaj: Kanita Suma
- Altuna Sejdiu: Aldo Bardhi
