= Tuner =

Tuner may refer to someone or something which adjusts or configures a mechanical, electronic, or musical device.

== Electronic ==
- Antenna tuner, an adjustable device that matches the impedance at the end of a transmission line to an antenna or a radio
- ATSC tuner, a device that receives digital television broadcasts
- Tuner (radio), a module or device which separates out one channel from low-amplitude radio-frequency signals for further processing or output, such as AM, FM, or TV broadcasts
- TV tuner card, a device that allows reception of television on a computer
- TV gateway, or network TV tuner, a device that receives digital television broadcasts and streams them over an IP network

== Musical ==
- Electronic tuner, a device used by musicians and technicians to measure the pitch of a musical instrument to adjust or correct the input signal to the desired pitch
- Tuning mechanisms for stringed instruments, such as tuning pegs, tuning pins, tuning levers, & konso
  - Machine head, a flat handle for the worm gear on a string instrument upon which a string is wound
- Tuner (band), an electronic rock duo consisting of Pat Mastelotto and Markus Reuter

== Mechanical ==
- Tuner (car), a customized car or hot-rod

== Other ==
- Tuner (film), a 2025 thriller film

== See also ==
- Microtuner
- Tuna (disambiguation)
- Tuning (disambiguation)
