= Rita Petro =

Albanian writer, poet and publisher (born 1962)

- Born: Rita Petro (Filipi); 13 March 1962 (age 64); Tirana, PR Albania
- Education: University of Tirana; University of Athens
- Occupations: Writer, poet, publisher
- Years active: 1985–present

Rita Petro (born 13 March 1962) is an Albanian writer, poet and publisher.

== Early life and education ==
Petro was born in Tirana, Albania. She studied Albanian language and literature at the University of Tirana from 1980 to 1984. In 1993, she completed further studies in ancient philosophy and culture at the University of Athens.

== Career ==
From 1985 to 2000, Petro worked as an editor at the state publishing house of school books.

In 2000, she co-founded the publishing house Albas, together with Latif Ajrullai.The company operates in Albania, Kosovo, North Macedonia and the Preševo Valley and focuses mainly on educational publications.

Petro has contributed as a co-author to numerous school textbooks in Albanian language and literature used in pre-university education.

Her literary works have been published in various literary journals and anthologies, and translated into several languages, including French, German, English, Romanian and Macedonian.

== Works ==
Petro's works include:

- Vargje të përfolura (1993)
- Shija e instinktit (1998)
- Këtu poshtë këndohet live (2002)
- Në intimitet (2006)
- Vrima (2014)
- Lindur së prapthi (2022)

== Reception ==
The poetry collection Vrima (2014) received public attention following its publication and was widely discussed in Albanian media. It also generated controversy, largely due to its explicit treatment of the human body and sexuality, which some critics and commentators considered provocative or inappropriate.

== Awards ==
Petro has received several literary awards, including:

- Onufri Prize (1999)
- National Bibliophile Prize “Lumo Skëndo” (2014)
- Prize for Poetry Career (2014)

In 2025, she was named Poet Laureate of Albania for the period 2025–2027.

== Personal life ==
Petro was in a relationship with publisher Latif Ajrullai, co-founder of the publishing house Albas.

Ajrullai died in November 2020 after contracting COVID-19.
