= White tuna =

White tuna may refer to

- Albacore tuna, Thunnus alalunga – the pale-fleshed tuna favored by the canning industry, also known as shiro maguro, bin-naga maguro, or bincho maguro
- Escolar, Lepidocybium flavobrunneum – a snake mackerel, which is often labeled as "white tuna"
