= Kanita =

Albanian singer (born 2001)

- Born: Kanita Suma; 26 July 2001 (age 25); Skopje, Macedonia
- Genres: Pop
- Occupation: Singer
- Years active: 2013–present

Kanita Suma (born 26 July 2001), also known mononymously as Kanita, is an Albanian singer from North Macedonia.

== Life and career ==
Kanita Suma was born on 26 July 2001 into an Albanian family in the city of Skopje, Macedonia. Suma rose to prominence as she auditioned for the second season of X Factor Albania in 2012 finishing in the fourth place. She continued her musical career and participated in Kënga Magjike on two occasions, in 2014 and 2018. In October 2019, the Albanian broadcaster, Radio Televizioni Shqiptar (RTSH), announced that Suma would compete in the 58th edition of Festivali i Këngës, the country's national selection competition for the Eurovision Song Contest 2020, with the song "Ankth". In the semi-finals, she failed to qualify for the grand final of Festivali i Këngës. In January 2020, "Fllad" was released and went on to reach number seventy eight in Albania.

== Discography ==
=== Singles ===
==== As lead artist ====
Title	Year	Peak chart positions		Album
Title	Year	ALB	CIS	Album
"Ëndrra ime"	2013	*	—	Non-album single
"Mia Vita"	2013	*	—	Non-album single
"Digjem për ty" (with Leonora Poloska)	2014	*	—	Non-album single
"Young and Reckless"	2015	*	—	Non-album single
"Champion" (with Castor)	2016	—	—	Non-album single
"S'e di pse"	2016	—	—	Non-album single
"Don't Let Me Go"	2016	4	—	Non-album single
"Don't Let Me Go (Gon Haziri Remix)"	2017	36	94	Non-album single
"They Said"	2018	48	—	Non-album single
"S'jemi ne"	2018	—	—	Non-album single
"Stranger"	2019	84	—	Non-album single
"Ankth"	2019	—	—	Non-album single
"Fllad"	2020	78	—	Non-album single
"—" denotes a recording that did not chart or was not released in that territory.

==== As featured artist ====
Title	Year	Album
"Jale" (Yaar featuring Kanita)	2019	Non-album singles
"Hala" (Valza featuring Kanita)	2020	Non-album singles
