= Jonida Maliqi =

Albanian singer (born 1983)

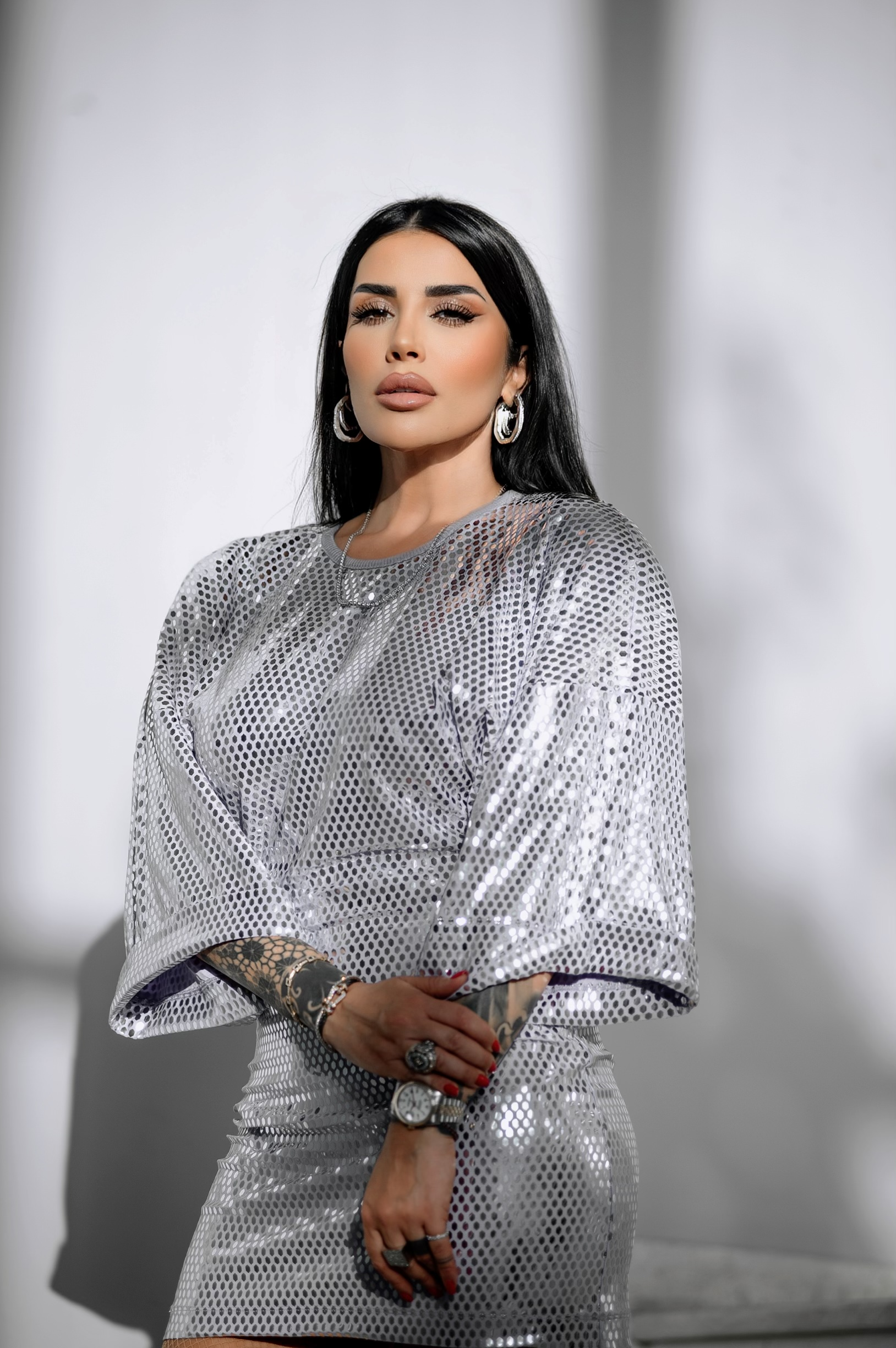
- Born: 26 March 1983 (age 43); Tirana, Albania
- Education: University of Arts, Tirana, Albania
- Occupation: Singer
- Years active: 1995–present
- Musical career
- Instruments: Vocals

Jonida Maliqi (Albanian pronunciation: [jɔˈnida maˈlici]; born 26 March 1983) is an Albanian singer and media personality.

Throughout her career, Maliqi has won six awards at Kënga Magjike and first place in 2008. She is also a double winner of accolades at the Top Fest in 2006 and 2010 respectively. Maliqi played Bithia in the Albanian version of The Ten Commandments: The Musical and starred as Juliet in the Albanian theatre production of Roméo et Juliette. In 2012, she was appointed as the captain of her team at the Albanian version of the Dutch TV series I Love My Country whereas in 2014 she co-hosted the fourth season of Dancing with the Stars. In 2016, Maliqi appeared as a judge on the fifth season of The Voice of Albania and in 2018 she became the sixteenth representative of Albania at the Eurovision Song Contest 2019, finishing 9th in the second semi-final with 96 points and ended in the 17th place in grand final.

== Life and career ==
Jonida Maliqi was born on 26 March 1983 into an Albanian family hailing from Gjirokastër in the city of Tirana. Maliqi attended the elementary and music school Dëshmorët e Lirisë in Tirana and thus took guitar and violin lessons at an early age. Following this, the singer enrolled at the Jordan Misja Lyceum, later studying canto at the Academy of Arts in Tirana. Maliqi started her early forays into the music industry at age 13 in 1995 as she participated at the 34th edition of Festivali i Këngës.

After her solo debut in 1999, Maliqi participates at "Festivali i Këngës" for another three consecutive years with songs "Çast", "Ik" and "Do Humbas Me Ty" which placed third at the 41st edition. In 2001, Maliqi pursued studies at the Academy of Arts under the mentorship of the Albanian professor Nina Mula, the mother of Albanian soprano Inva Mula. Meanwhile, her participation at various music festivals continued. In 2003, Maliqi won "The Best Performer" category at Kënga Magjike for "Vetëm Një Natë", whereas in 2004, she won the "Ethno Music Award" for "Nuk Kam Faj Që Robëroj". In 2005, Maliqi announced a work on her debut album Nuk Të Pres and won the "Best Interpretation Award" at Kënga Magjike for "Papagalli i Dashurisë".

After her graduation in 2006, Maliqi starred in the Albanian version of The Ten Commandments: The Musical as Bithia, and in the same year she released her debut album Nuk Të Pres upon her birthday. That year, her collaboration with Macedonian-Albanian singer Tuna spawned the hit "Forca e Femrës" which won the "Best Female Award" at Top Fest. The performance attracted much comment due to their antics on stage that were interpreted by many as a likely titillated lesbian act. Meanwhile, some tabloids instated Tuna as "protégée in Jonida's same-sex erotica and polymorphous sexuality". However, both artists denied the allegations about their lesbian relationship. In 2008, Maliqi returned with a new single "Njëri Nga Ata" which entered "Kënga Magjike" and won the competition alongside the "Best Song" and the "10th Anniversary Award". In 2010, she collaborated with Albanian rapper Big Basta and their song "Sot t'i Japim Fund" won the "Best Pop & R&B Song" at the Top Fest.

In 2011, Maliqi returned to "Kënga Magjike" with "Thesar pa Emër" which won "Çesk Zadeja Award" whereas in 2012 she became the captain of her team at the Albanian version of the Dutch TV-series "I Love My Country". In 2013, she won "Jon Music Award" for "Ti" and then was announced as a host of the first season of The Voice Kids but withdrew. On the same year, Maliqi starred at the musical "Romeo and Juliet" as Juliet opposite Albanian Skënderaj. In 2014, she co-hosted the fourth season of "Dancing with the Stars" whereas in 2015 she released a new song called "Jam Bërë Si Ti".

In 2016, Maliqi appeared as a judge on the fifth season of "The Voice of Albania" between 9 January 2016 and 16 April 2016. On 10 May 2018, Maliqi released the song "N’Errësirë".

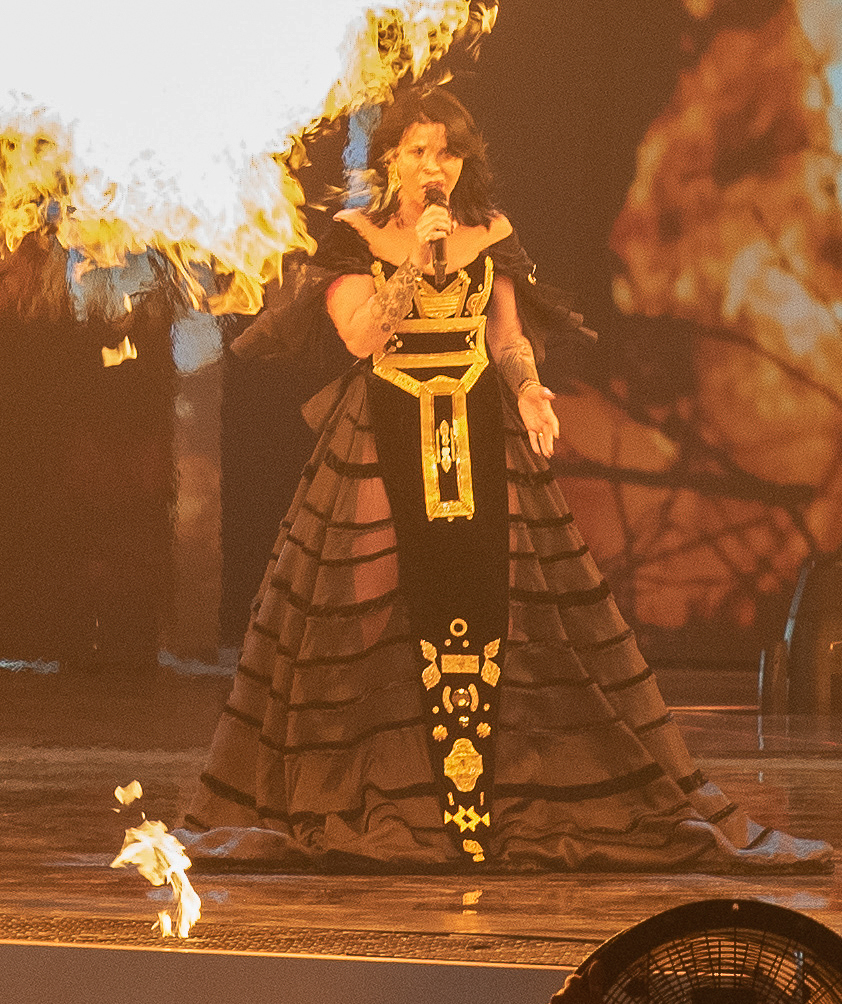
Maliqi at Eurovision 2019

On 20 December 2018, Maliqi participated and won the 57th edition of the Festivali i Këngës thus becoming Albania's sixteenth representative at Eurovision Song Contest with the song "Ktheju tokës". The song finished seventeenth in the final.

In 2021, Maliqi co-hosted Festivali i Këngës 60.

== Other ventures ==
Jonida launched her own haute couture boutique in 2009 and another shoe salon in 2017.

=== Philanthropy ===
Maliqi's diverse charitable activities include campaigns for encouraging awareness about breast cancer; promoting the value, acceptance and inclusion of people with Down syndrome, as well as consistent benefit performances at charity concerts. One of her notable publicised case took place during the live broadcast of "Top Show Magazine" at Top Channel in which she surprised a girl born with Down syndrome and presented her with a new iPad. Maliqi's other charitable endeavours cover a wide range of causes.

== Personal life ==
Maliqi was previously married to Albanian businessman Gent Prizreni. In March 2017, the couple announced their divorce. Jonida and Gent have a son together.

== Discography ==
=== Albums ===
- Nuk të pres (2005)

=== Singles ===
==== As lead artist ====
Title	Year	Peak chart positions	Album
Title	Year	ALB	Album
"Planeti i fëmijëve" (with Aleksandër Rrapi)	1995	—N/a	Non-album singles
"Flas me ëngjëllin tim" (with Kastriot Tusha)	1997	—N/a	Non-album singles
"Do jetoj pa ty"	1999	—N/a	Non-album singles
"Përse të adhuroj"	1999	—N/a	Non-album singles
"Do jetoja pa ty"	1999	—N/a	Non-album singles
"Çast"	2000	—N/a	Non-album singles
"Ik"	2001	—N/a	Non-album singles
"Ti s'më meriton"	2002	—N/a	Non-album singles
"Larg teje"	2002	—N/a	Non-album singles
"Do humbas më ty"	2002	—N/a	Non-album singles
"Vetëm një natë"	2003	—N/a	Non-album singles
"Ne të dashuruar"	2004	—N/a	Non-album singles
"Nuk kam faj që roberoj"	2004	—N/a	Non-album singles
"Frikëm se më pëlqen"	2004	—N/a	Non-album singles
"Fli tani"	2005	—N/a	Non-album singles
"Papagalli i dashurisë"	2005	—N/a	Non-album singles
"Forca e femrës" (with Tuna)	2006	—N/a	Non-album singles
"Pa identitet"	2006	—N/a	Non-album singles
"Parfum nate"	2007	—N/a	Non-album singles
"S'ka fajtor në dashuri"	2007	—N/a	Non-album singles
"Mother (Kthehëm të dielën)" (with Gjergj Leka)	2008	—N/a	Non-album singles
"Njëri nga ata"	2008	—N/a	Non-album singles
"Sot t'i japim fund" (featuring Big Basta)	2010	—N/a	Non-album singles
"Një orë më shumë"	2011	—N/a	Non-album singles
"Fantastik"	2011	—N/a	Non-album singles
"Thesar pa emër"	2011	—N/a	Non-album singles
"Sonte" (featuring Dj Blunt and Real 1)	2013	—N/a	Non-album singles
"Ti"	2013	—N/a	Non-album singles
"Jam bërë si ti"	2015	—N/a	Non-album singles
"N'errësirë"	2018	85	Non-album singles
"Ktheju tokës"	2019	—N/a	Non-album singles
"Need You" (with Obie Kellz)	2022	—N/a	Non-album singles
"Asnjë tjetër"	2024	—N/a	Non-album singles
"—" denotes a recording that did not chart or was not released in that territory.

Awards and achievements
Preceded by Aurela Gaçe with "Hape veten"	Kënga Magjike; Winner; 2008	Succeeded by Eliza Hoxha and Rosela Gjylbegu with "Njëri nga ata"
Preceded by Eugent Bushpepa with "Mall"	Festivali i Këngës; Winner; 2018	Succeeded by Arilena Ara with "Shaj"
Preceded by Eugent Bushpepa with "Mall"	Albania in the Eurovision Song Contest; 2019	Succeeded by Arilena Ara with "Fall from the Sky"
