= Sohag Markaz =

Metropolitan area province in Sohag Governorate in upper Egypt

Sohag Markaz is a Metropolitan area province in Sohag Governorate in upper Egypt. It contains the Governorate capital of Sohag.
