= Fall from the Sky (song) =

2020 song by Arilena Ara

Single by Arilena Ara
- Released: 9 March 2020
- Genre: Pop
- Length: 3:08
- Label: Independent
- Composer(s): Darko Dimitrov; Lazar Cvetkoski
- Lyricist(s): Arilena Ara; Michael Blue; Robert Stevenson; Sam Schummer
- Producer(s): Arilena Ara; Darko Dimitrov; Lazar Cvetkoski; Michael Blue; Robert Stevenson; Sam Schummer

Arilena Ara singles chronology
"Doja" (2019)	"Fall from the Sky" (2020)	"A i sheh" (2020)

Alternative covers
- Official cover of "Shaj"

Music video
- "Fall from the Sky" on YouTube

Eurovision Song Contest 2020 entry
- Country: Albania
- Artist(s): Arilena Ara
- Language: English
- Composer(s): Darko Dimitrov; Lazar Cvetkoski
- Lyricist(s): Arilena Ara; Michael Blue; Robert Stevenson; Sam Schummer

Finals performance
- Semi-final result: Contest cancelled

Entry chronology
- ◄ "Ktheju tokës" (2019)
- "Karma" (2021) ►

"Fall from the Sky" is a song by Albanian singer Arilena Ara, independently released as a single on 9 March 2020. The song was composed by Darko Dimitrov and Lazar Cvetkoski, and written by Michael Blue, Robert Stevenson and Sam Schummer. Musically, it is a pop ballad with the instrumentation incorporating violins and a piano. The English-language song makes lyrically reference to Arilena's hopeless desire to overcome deep and perplexing emotions.

"Fall from the Sky" was scheduled to represent Albania in the Eurovision Song Contest 2020 in Rotterdam, the Netherlands, before the contest's cancellation due to the pandemic of COVID-19 and its spread throughout Europe. Arilena had been previously selected as the country's representative, after winning the pre-selection competition, Festivali i Këngës, with the song's Albanian-language version "Shaj".

Both versions were met with favourable response from music critics, receiving praise for their compositions and Arilena's vocal delivery. An accompanying lyric video for the song was officially premiered to the YouTube channel of the Eurovision Song Contest on 10 March with the music video being ultimately released on 11 May 2020. Footage of Arilena performing the song at the Mother Teresa Square in Tirana, Albania, was broadcast among others during the Eurovision Home Concerts series on 8 May 2020.

== Background and composition ==
In 2019, Arilena was announced as one of the twenty contestants selected to compete in the 58th edition of Festivali i Këngës, a competition for determining Albania's participant for the Eurovision Song Contest 2020. As part of the competition's rules, the lyrics of the participating entries had to be in the Albanian language. Arilena participated with the song "Shaj" written by Albanian singer and songwriter Lindon Berisha, and composed by Macedonian producers Darko Dimitrov and Lazar Cvetkoski. After winning Festivali i Këngës, Arilena revealed that "Shaj" initially came to her in the English language, and she had envisioned the possibility of remastering the song for her participation in the Eurovision Song Contest. However, in February 2020, following several months spent in Los Angeles, she eventually confirmed the aforementioned. "Fall from the Sky" was then revealed as the title of the song after three weeks on 8 March 2020 through a social media post.

Lasting three minutes and eight seconds, "Fall from the Sky" was written by Michael Blue, Robert Stevenson and Sam Schummer, and composed by Darko Dimitrov and Lazar Cvetkoski. Musically, the song is a pop ballad with an instrumentation consisting of traditional violin and piano sounds. Lyrically, it expresses Arilena's hopeless desire to overcome deep and perplexing emotions that she could not forget.

== Critical reception ==
Following its release and victory at Festivali i Këngës, "Shaj" received favourable response from music critics. Eurovision.de writer, Irving Wolther, referred to the song as a "melancholic power ballad". Mark Savage from BBC opined that "she belts out the high notes with all the subtlety of a klaxon in an elevator shaft" and went on into praising the composition and Arilena's vocal delivery. Following the premiere of the remastered version, entitled "Fall from the Sky", Wiwibloggs writer Luis Fuster elaborated, saying that "the song does keep the essence of 'Shaj'; in fact, it feels more like a good revamp year for Albania". Another editor gave the song three stars out of five, writing "the song is an elegant Bond theme packed with dramatic theatrics" while simultaneously praising the song's instrumentation.

== Release and promotion ==
"Fall from the Sky" was independently released on digital platforms and streaming services as a single on 9 March 2020. On the following day, an accompanying lyric video for the song was officially premiered to the YouTube channel of the Eurovision Song Contest. The official music video was ultimately released to YouTube on the aforementioned channel on 11 May 2020. The dramatic-characterised video depicts Arilena all alone against a white backdrop with slightly blue lights in three different settings, most notably signing next to a piano, a white-coloured tree, and a white human-size bird cage. For promotional and supporting purposes, Arilena was scheduled to embark on a small tour with performances in Amsterdam, London and Madrid. However, the tour was canceled alongside the cancellation of the contest, due to the pandemic of the coronavirus disease 2019 (COVID-19). Footage of the singer performing the song for the first time was broadcast during her Sounds of Silence concert at the Mother Teresa Square in Tirana on 2 May as well as during the European Broadcasting Union's (EBU) Eurovision Home Concerts series on 8 May 2020.

== At Eurovision ==
=== Festivali i Këngës ===
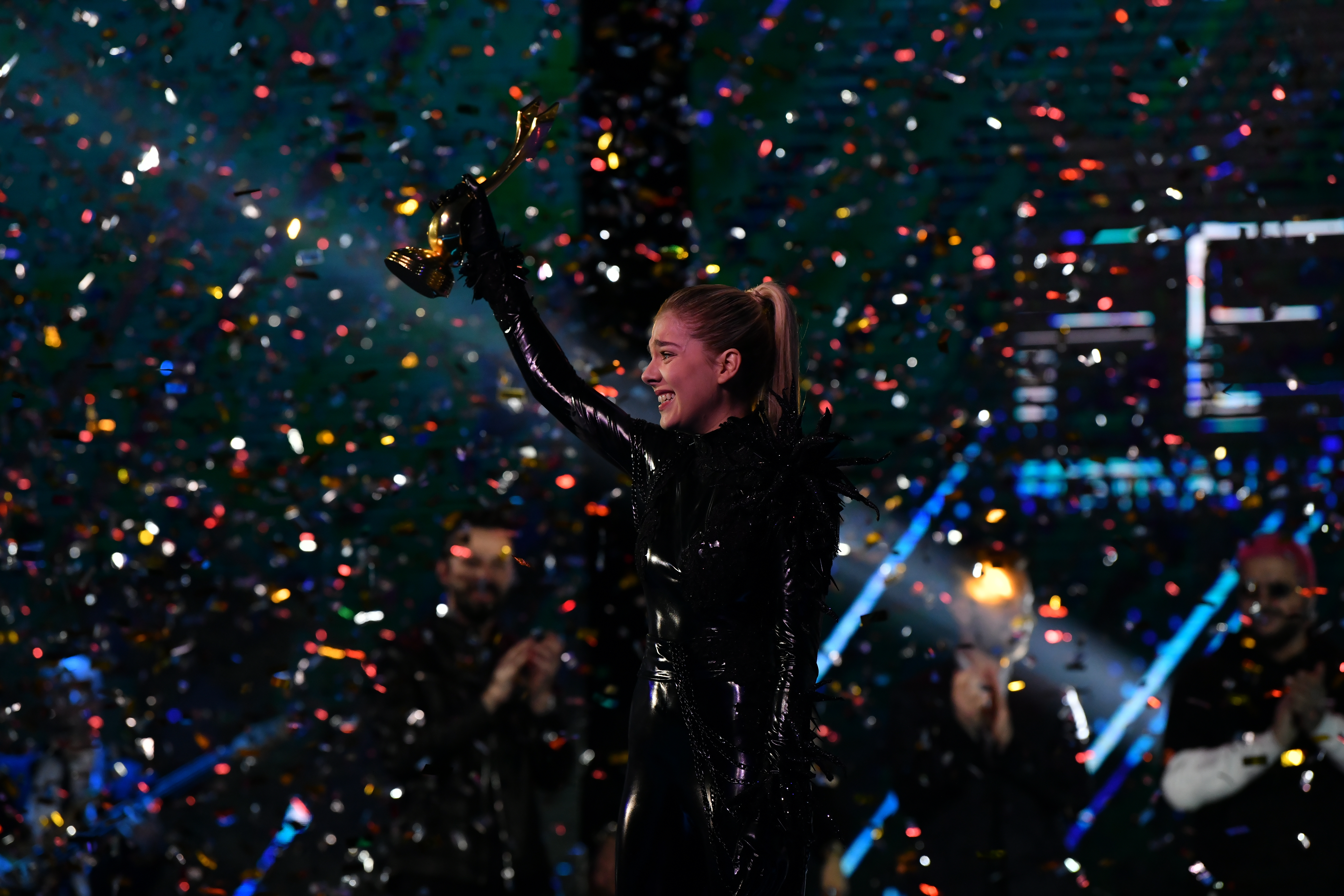
Arilena Ara after winning the 58th edition of Festivali i Këngës in December 2019.

The national broadcaster of Albania, Radio Televizioni Shqiptar (RTSH), organised the 58th edition of Festivali i Këngës to determine the country's representative for the Eurovision Song Contest 2020 in Rotterdam, the Netherlands. It opened a submission period where artists, bands and composers were able to submit their songs to the broadcaster between 28 May and 15 September 2019, while a jury panel internally selected 20 songs to participate in the competition's semi-finals. During the grand final, Arilena and her Albanian-language song "Shaj" was chosen to represent Albania at the contest after receiving 67 total points. After her victory at the competition, mixed reactions followed with multiple individuals criticising the competition itself and attributing the singer's victory to arranged voting.

=== Rotterdam ===
The 65th edition of the Eurovision Song Contest was scheduled to take place in Rotterdam, the Netherlands, consisting of two semi-finals on 12 May and 14 May 2020, and the grand final on 16 May 2020. According to the Eurovision rules, each participating country, except the host country and the "Big Five" including France, Germany, Italy, Spain and the United Kingdom, were required to qualify from one of two semi-finals to compete for the grand final. On 28 January 2020, it was announced that "Fall from the Sky" would be performed in the second half of the second semi-final of the contest on 14 May 2020. However, on 18 March 2020, the European Broadcasting Union (EBU) announced the contest's cancellation due to the pandemic of the coronavirus disease 2019 (COVID-19) and its spread throughout Europe. Soon after, the EBU confirmed that intended 2020 entries were not eligible to compete in the following edition of the contest in 2021.

==== Alternative contests ====
Broadcasters who were scheduled to take part in the Eurovision Song Contest 2020 have organised alternative music competitions. Austrian broadcaster, Österreichischer Rundfunk (ORF), who organised Der kleine Song Contest in April 2020, saw every entry being assigned to one of three semi-finals. A jury, consisting of ten members that had represented Austria at the contest before, was hired to rank each song, however, the highest-placed in each semi-final advanced to the final. In the third semi-final on 18 April, "Fall from the Sky" placed fourth in a field of thirteen participants, achieving a total of 62 points. On 9 May 2020, the song unsuccessfully took part on the Swedish Sveriges 12:a organised by the country's national broadcaster Sveriges Television (SVT).

== Personnel ==
Credits adapted from Tidal.

- Arilena Ara – producing, songwriting, vocals
- Darko Dimitrov – composing, producing
- Lazar Cvetkoski – composing, producing
- Michael Blue – producing, songwriting
- Robert Stevenson – producing, songwriting
- Sam Schummer – producing, songwriting

== Track listing ==
- Digital download
1. "Shaj" – 2:57
2. "Fall from the Sky" – 3:08
3. "Fall from the Sky" (Karaoke Version) – 3:08

== Release history ==
Release dates and formats for "Fall from the Sky"
Region	Date	Format(s)	Version	Label	Ref.
Various	20 December 2019	Digital download; streaming	Festivali i Këngës	Independent	
Various	9 March 2020	Digital download; streaming	Eurovision Song Contest	Independent	
