= Tuna (singer) =

Macedonian-Albanian singer-songwriter (born 1985)

Tuna Туна
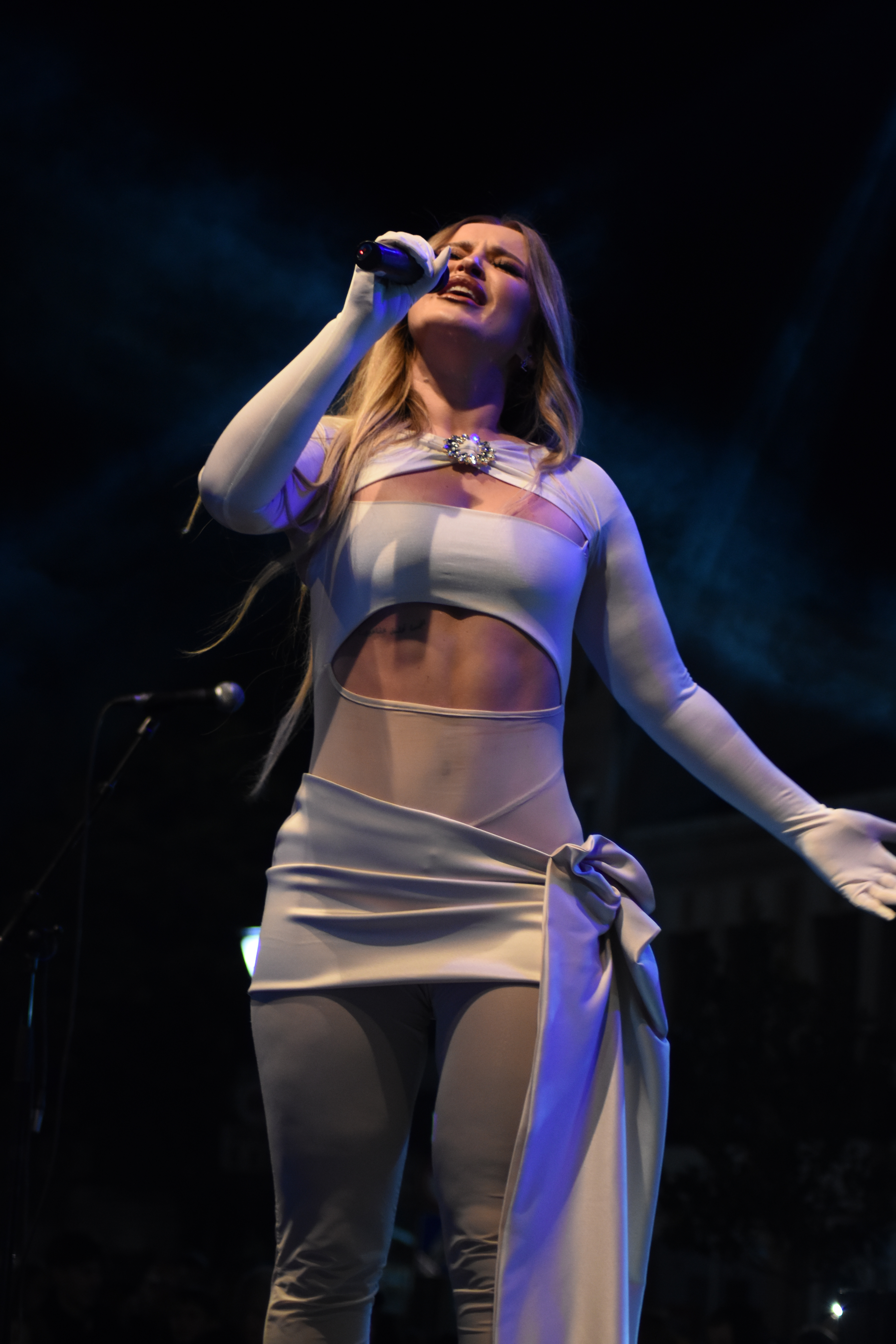
- Tuna in 2023

Background information
- Born: Altuna Sejdiu; 14 July 1985 (age 41); Skopje, SR Macedonia, SFR Yugoslavia
- Occupations: Singer; songwriter
- Years active: 2000–present
- Label: Independent

Altuna Sejdiu (Macedonian: Алтуна Сејдиу; Albanian pronunciation: [alˈtuna ˈsɛjˈdiu]; born 14 July 1985), also known professionally as Tuna (Macedonian: Туна), is an Albanian singer and songwriter.

== Life and career ==
Altuna Sejdiu was born on 14 July 1985 into an Albanian family in the city of Skopje, then part of the Socialist Republic of Macedonia, present North Macedonia. Her father, Shaban Sejdiu, is a freestyle wrestler and two-time Olympic bronze medal winner. Tuna discovered her passion for music at an early age participating in various music festivals.

Her professional career began in 2002 when she competed in the talent search competition Play - Search For A Star organized by the Macedonian record label M2 Production. Sejdiu was one of two winners from the competition, which resulted in the release of her first single "Najdi den, najdi nokj, najdi vreme" (Find a day, Find a night, Find time). Tuna later began to establish her career in Albania and turned focus to releasing material in the Albanian language. In 2003, she released her debut self-titled album Tuna, with her successful songs "Piroman" (the Albanian version of "Najdi Nok Najdi Den Najdi Vreme") , "Ciao Machoman" and "12 Muaj/12 Meseci" (12 Months) which was followed by her second album, S'ka me diktaturë, in 2005.

In 2008, Tuna unsuccessfully participated in the pre-selection competition Skopje Fest in order to represent North Macedonia in the Eurovision Song Contest 2008 with the song "Prašuvam bez glas". In 2012, it was announced that she would judge alongside Alban Skënderaj, Pandi Laço and Soni Malaj on the second series of X Factor Albania. The same year, she released her single "I Asaj" and experienced significant success throughout the Albanian-speaking World. Her success continued in the following year with the release of her follow-up single "Fenix".

In 2019, Tuna announced her third studio album, Fortuna, with seven songs and released it on 18 March 2019. Throughout the year, she released her follow-up singles "Nuk ma do zemra" and "Amoni", the latter peaking at number seventy eight in Albania.

== Discography ==
=== Albums ===
- Tuna (2003)
- S'ka me diktaturë (2005)
- Fortuna (2019)

=== Songs ===
- 2002: Ciao Machoman
- 2003:
  - Piroman/Najdi Nok Najdi Den Najdi Vreme
  - 12 Muaj/12 Meseci
- 2004:
  - Vetem Unë Dhe Ti
  - Kiss
- 2005:
  - Ljubi Ljubi (Ft. Tamara Todevska)
  - Ska Me Diktaturë
  - Psikologet
  - Testament
  - Bardh E Zi
- 2006:
  - Forca E Femres (Ft. Jonida Maliqi)
  - Xhuxh
  - Asgje Ne Ket Botë
- 2007:
  - Hajde
  - Bileta/Tickets
  - Njo (Ft. Skillz)
- 2008:
  - Inati/Prasuvam Bez Glas
  - Interesi (Shes)
- 2009:
  - So Eden Zbor (Ft. Robert Bilbilov)
  - E boj Nxhet/Challenge (Ft. Vig Poppa)
  - Verë E Nxhet (Ft. Meda & Getoar Selimi)
  - Vdiq Edhe Nje Dashuri
- 2010:
  - Vibe (Ft. 2po2 & Dafina Zeqiri)
  - Pse Jo
- 2011:
  - Dyshemeja
  - E Para dhe E Fundit
  - Bebi I Vitit E Ri (Ft. Noizy)
- 2012: I Asaj
- 2013: Fenix (Ft. Cozman)
- 2014:
  - Babe
  - MMV (Ft. Getoar Selimi)
  - Pardon
- 2015:
  - Nobody There
  - Holla (Ft. Cozman)
  - Knocks Me Out (Ft. Franques & Fatman Scoop)
- 2016:
  - Dy Tima
  - Zemra Jem (Ft. Vig Poppa)
  - Bermuda
  - Duam
- 2018:
  - Chonga
  - Maria (Ft. Seven)
- 2019:
  - Tani Mke Zemer
  - A Don Hala (Ft. Yll Limani)
  - Plage
  - Krejt Mu Kan Perzi
  - Harrova 2019 (Ft. Armend Rexhepagiqi)
  - Dreqi E Marrte
  - Nese Vdes E Re
  - Nuk Ma Do Zemra
  - Amoni
- 2022:
  - Kthehna (Ft. The Victor)
  - Melaqe (Ft. Fifi)
  - A Je (Ft. Skerdi)
  - Prej Teje S'e Prita (Ft. NRG Band)
- 2023:
  - I Huj (Ft. Cozman)
  - Qa Bone
  - Ani (Ft. Markel Goga)
