= Eli Fara =

Albanian singer (born 1967)

Eli Fara AM
- Born: 21 May 1967 (age 59); Korçë, PR Albania
- Occupation: Singer
- Years active: 1980–present
- Awards: Merited Artist
- Musical career
- Instruments: Vocals

Eli Fara AM (Albanian: [ɛˈli faˈɾa]; born 21 May 1967) is an Albanian singer.

== Life and career ==
Fara was born on 21 May 1967 in the city of Korçë, then part of the People's Socialist Republic, present Albania. She is of Aromanian descent, her surname means seed in Albanian. She first came to prominence as a performer of the urban folk songs of her home region. In 1988, she was invited to appear at the National Folklore Festival in Gjirokastër. Albania had no record industry to speak of prior to the fall of Communism and as late as 1993 it was still only possible to buy cassette albums by a handful of artists - one of whom was Eli Fara. She has spent much of the intervening period overseas but has remained very popular in her native country. In recent years she has recorded more modern music although she still sings some of the folk songs from Korçë that first brought her to the attention of the Albanian public. In 2012, Fara was a finalist at Kënga Magjike (The Magic Song) with "Romale", a song mixed with various genres.
