= Tiri Gjoci =

Albanian singer (born 1993)

- Born: Tahir Gjoci; 5 November 1993 (age 32); Kavajë, Albania
- Origin: Albania
- Genres: Pop, alternative, blues, pop-rock, dance-hall
- Occupations: Musician, singer
- Years active: 2007–present

Tiri Gjoci (born Tahir Gjoci; 5 November 1993) (short; Tiri), is an Albanian singer, active in genres like pop, alternative, blues, pop-rock, and dance-hall. His musical career began at age 14. Tiri was introduced to the public when he was featured in the Dr Flori 2013 hit "Zemërthyer". Tiri later took part in various music competitions. He was in a group called Bon Bon Band that won "Best Group" at the TV contest Kënga Magjike in 2014. He became winner of season 5 of The Voice of Albania in 2016.

In December 2018, Tiri released the rock-ballad "Adriane" and on 8 May 2019 he published the hit "Zemer", followed on 8 July 2019 by the single "Kujtimet". Gjoci is in a relationship with journalist Krisa Caushi.
