= List of The Voice Kids TV series =

The Voice Kids is a version of The Voice TV series franchise in which children participate.

== Versions ==
The first such variation was The Voice Kids from the Netherlands, which was followed by other international variants:

Franchise with a currently airing season
Franchise with an upcoming season
Franchise with an unknown status
Franchise that has ceased to air
Franchise that was cancelled during production
Original version (Netherlands)

Country or region	Local title	Network	Winners	Coaches	Hosts
Africa Françafrique	The Voice Afrique Francophone Kids	VoxAfrica	Season 1, 2022: Myriam Obama	Daphne Njie; Sidiki Diabaté; Teeyah; KS Bloom ^{7}	Willy Dumbo
Albania	The Voice Kids	Top Channel	Season 1, 2013: Rita Thaçi; Season 2, 2018: Denis Bonjaku [sq]; Season 3, 2019: Altea Ali	Season 4, 2023: Altin Goci (1); Elton Deda (1); Alma Bektashi (1); Eneda Tarifa (2); Miriam Cani (2–3); Aleksandër Gjoka & Renis Gjoka (duo, 2–3); Arilena Ara (3)	Xhemi Shehu (1); Ledion Liço (2); Dojna Mema (backstage, 2; main, 3); Flori Gjini (backstage, 3)
Arab World	The Voice Kids – أحلى صوت; The Voice Kids – Best Voice	MBC 1 MBC 3 MBC Iraq; MTV; LBCI	Season 1, 2016: Lynn Hayek; Season 2, 2017–18: Hamza Labyad; Season 3, 2020: Mohamad Islam Rmeih; Season 4, 2026; Upcoming Season	Current; Nancy Ajram; Mohamed Hamaki (3–); Assi El Helani (3–); Former; Tamer Hosny (1–3); Kazem al-Saher (1–3)	Current; Annabella Hilal (4–); Yaser Al Sakkaf (4–); Former; Mohammad Kareem (1); Nadine Njeim (1); Aimée Sayah (2); Moamen Nour (2); Nardine Farag (3); Badr Al Zaidan (3)
Australia	The Voice Kids	Nine Network	Season 1, 2014: Alexa Curtis	Delta Goodrem (1); Mel B (1); Joel & Benji Madden (duo, 1)	Darren McMullen (1); Prinnie Stevens (backstage, 1)
Azerbaijan	Səs Uşaqlar; The Voice Kids Azerbaijan	itv	Season 1, 2020–21: Amina Hajiyeva; Season 2, 2026-27: Upcoming Season	Cingiz Mustafayev; Zulfiyya Khanbabayeva; Murad Arif	Leyla Quliyeva
Belgium	The Voice Kids (Dutch)	vtm	Season 1, 2014: Mentissa Aziza; Season 2, 2015: Jens Dolleslagers; Season 3, 2017: Katarina Pohlodkova; Season 4, 2018: Jade De Rijcke; Season 5, 2020: Gala Aliaj; Season 6, 2022: Karista Khan; Season 7, 2023: Sikudhani Wangui Mbugua; Season 8, 2026: Upcoming Season	Current; Laura Tesoro (3–); Metejoor (6–); Pommelien Thijs (7–); Coely (7–); Former; Regi Penxten (1); Natalia (1–2); Slongs Dievanongs (2); Josje Huisman (3); Sean Dhondt (1–5); Gers Pardoel (4–5); K3 (trio, 4–6); Duncan Laurence (6)	Current; An Lemmens; Sieg De Doncker (4–); Former; Kürt Rogiers (1–3)
Belgium	The Voice Kids Belgique (French)	La Une; VivaCité	Season 1, 2020: Océana Siciliano; Season 2, 2023: Elena Kabongo; Season 3, 2025: Ilena Vigna	Current; Matthew Irons (1–); Alice on the Roof (2–); Joseph Kamel (3–); Typh Barrow (2–); Former; Vitaa (1); Slimane (1); Black M (2)	Maureen Louys; Prezzy
Brazil	The Voice Kids	Rede Globo	Season 1, 2016: Wagner Barreto; Season 2, 2017 [pt]: Thomas Machado; Season 3, 2018: Eduarda Brasil; Season 4, 2019: Jeremias Reis; Season 5, 2020: Kauê Penna; Season 6, 2021: Gustavo Bardim; Season 7, 2022: Isis Testa; Season 8, 2023: Henrique Lima; Season 9. 2026: Upcoming Season	Carlinhos Brown (1–8); Ivete Sangalo (1–2); Victor & Leo (duo, 1–2); Claudia Leitte (3–5); Simone & Simaria (duo, 3–5); Gaby Amarantos (6); Michel Teló (6–8); Maiara & Maraisa (7); Iza (8); Mumuzinho (8)	Tiago Leifert (1); Kika Martinez (backstage, 1); André Marques (2–5); Márcio Garcia (6–7); Thalita Rebouças (backstage, 2–6); Fatima Bernandes (8)
Cambodia	The Voice Kids	Hang Meas HDTV	Season 1, 2017: Pich Thai; Season 2, 2018: Tep Piseth; Season 3, 2022: Sarum Pansaha; Season 4. 2026: Upcoming Season	Current; Aok Sokunkantha; Soukon Nisa (1,3–); Zono (3–); Former; Preap Sovath (1–2); Sous Visa (2)	Chea Vibol; Kong Socheat
Canada	La Voix Junior (French); The Voice Junior	TVA	Season 1, 2016: Charles Kardos; Season 2, 2017: Sydney Lallier	Marie-Mai (1–2); Marc Dupré (1–2); Alex Nevsky (1–2)	Charles Lafortune (1–2)
Colombia	La Voz Kids; The Voice Kids	Caracol Televisión	Season 1, 2014 [es]: Ivanna García; Season 2, 2015 [es]: Luis Mario Torres; Season 3, 2018: Juan Sebastian Laverde; Season 4, 2019: Anabelle Campaña; Season 5, 2021: Maria Liz; Season 6, 2022: Diana Camila; Season 7, 2024: Carranga Kids; Season 8. 2026: Upcoming Season	Current; Andrés Cepeda; Kany García (6–); Nacho (6–); Former; Maluma (1–2); Fanny Lú (1–4); Sebastián Yatra (3–4); Natalia Jiménez (5); Jesús Navarro (5)	Current; Laura Tobon (3–5, 7–); Former; Linda Palma (1–2); Alejandro Palacio (1–4); Laura Acuña (5–6); Iván Lalinde (6)
Croatia	The Voice Kids	HRT	Season 1, 2024-25: Marino Vrgoč; Season 2, 2025-26: Nikol Kutnjak	Davor Gobac; Vanna; Mia Dimšić; Marko Tolja	TBA
Denmark	Voice Junior	TV 2 (1–5); Kanal 5 (6–); Website	Season 1, Spring 2014: Melina Neustrup Nielsen; Season 2, Fall 2014: Aland Mustafa; Season 3, 2015: Isabel; Season 4, 2016: Oliver Arndt; Season 5, 2017: Dafne Stilund Nielsen; Season 6, 2019: Camille Haven Beck	Wafande (1–6); Joey Moe (1–6); Oh Land (1–5); Mette Lindberg (6)	Current; Ihan Hayder (6–); Jacob Riising (6–); Former; Mikkel Kryger (1–5); Emilie Paevatalu (1–2); Amelia Høy (3–4); Stephania Potalivo (5)
Finland	The Voice Kids	Nelonen	Season 1, 2013: Molly Rosenström; Season 2, 2014: Aino Morko	Krista Siegfrids (1–2); Elastinen (1); Mira Luoti (1); Arttu Wiskari (2); Diandra Flores (2)	Axl Smith (1–2); Tea Khalifa (1–2)
France	The Voice Kids	TF1	Season 1, 2014 [fr]: Carla Georges; Season 2, 2015 [fr]: Jane Constance [fr]; Season 3, 2016 [fr]: Manuela Diaz; Season 4, 2017 [fr]: Angélina Nava; Season 5, 2018 [fr]: Emma Cerchi; Season 6, 2019 [fr]: Soan Arhimann [fr]; Season 7, 2020 [fr]: Rébecca Sayaque; Season 8, 2022 [fr]: Raynaud Sadon; Season 9, 2023 [fr]: Durel Loumouamou; Season 10, 2024: Tim; Season 11, 2025: Charlotte Deseigne; Season 12, 2026: Upcoming Season	Current; Patrick Fiori (2–); Slimane (9–); Lara Fabian (10–); Claudio Capéo (10–) ^{7}; Former; Garou (1); Louis Bertignac (1–2); Matt Pokora (3–4); Amel Bent (5–6); Jenifer (1–7); Soprano (5–7); Louane (8); Julien Doré (8); Kendji Girac (7–); Nolwenn Leroy (9–)	Nikos Aliagas(1-); Karine Ferri(1-) (backstage)
Georgia	The Voice Kids	Imedi TV	Season 1, 2013: Reziko Didebashvili	Eka Kakhiani (1); Dato Porchkhidze (1); Stephane Mgebrishvili (1)	Samory Balde (1); Ruska Makashvili (1)
Germany	The Voice Kids	Sat.1	{{plainlist|: Season 1, 2013: Michèle Bircher; Season 2, 2014: Danyiom Mesmer; Season 3, 2015: Noah-Levi Korth; Season 4, 2016: Lukas Janisch; Season 5, 2017: Sofie Thomas; Season 6, 2018: Anisa Celik; Season 7, 2019: Mimi & Josefin; Season 8, 2020: Lisa-Marie Ramm; Season 9, 2021: Egon Werler; Season 10, 2022: Georgia Balke; Season 11, 2023: Emma Filipović; Season 12, 2024: Jakob Hebgen; Season 13, 2025: Neo Klingl; Season 14, 2026: Katelyn Harrington	Current; Wincent Weiss (9–); Ayliva (13); Clueso (13); Stefanie Kloss (7, 9, 13); Former; Lena Meyer-Landrut (1–4, 7–8, 10–12); Tim Bendzko (1); Henning Wehland (1–2); Johannes Strate (2–3); Nena & Larissa(duo, 5–6); Mark Forster (3–7); The BossHoss (duo, 7); Max Giesinger (6, 8); Sasha Schmitz (4–5, 8); Deine Freunde (duo, 8); Michi Beck & Smudo (duo, 9–12); Álvaro Soler (9–12)	Current; Thore Schölermann; Melissa Khalaj (7–); Mimi & Josy (backstage-online, 8–); Former; Chantal Janzen (3–4); Debbie Schippers (5–6); Aline von Drateln (backstage, 1); Nela Lee (backstage, 2); Marc van Velzen (backstage-online, 1–3); Noah-Levi Korth (backstage-online, 4); Jonas Ems (backstage-online, 5); Iggi Kelly (backstage-online, 7)
Greece	The Voice Kids	ANT1 (planned)	2014–2015: Cancelled; Season 1: Awaiting confirmation by Skai TV	—N/a	—N/a
India	The Voice India Kids	&TV (1–2)	Season 1, 2016: Nishtha Sharma; Season 2, 2017–18: Manashi Saharia; Season 3, 2026: Upcoming Season	Neeti Mohan (1); Shekhar Ravjiani (1); Shaan (1–2); Papon (2); Palak Muchhal (2); Himesh Reshammiya (2)	Jay Bhanushali (1–2); Sugandha Mishra (1–2)
Indonesia	The Voice Kids Indonesia	GTV; Website	Season 1, 2016: Christopher Edgar; Season 2, 2017: Sharla Martiza; Season 3, 2018: Keva Hamzah; Season 4, 2021: Nikita Mawarni; Season 5. 2026: Upcoming Season	Current; Marcell Siahaan (3–); Isyana Sarasvati (4–); Yura Yunita & Rizky Febian (duo, 4–); Former; Bebi Romeo (1–2); Muhammad Tulus (1–2); Agnez Mo (1–3); Kaka (3)	Current; Ananda Omesh; Dian Ayu Lestari (backstage, 3–); Kimberley Fransa (online, 3–); Former; Ersa Mayori (backstage, 1–2); Kaneishia Yusuf (online, 2)
Italy	The Voice Kids	Rai 1	Season 1, Spring 2023: Melissa Agliottone; Season 2, Fall 2023: Simone Grande; Season 3, 2024: Melissa Memeti; Season 4, 2026: Matteo Trullu	Current; Loredana Bertè; Clementino; Arisa (2–); TBA (4–); Former; Ricchi e Poveri (duo, 1); Gigi D'Alessio (1–3)	Antonella Clerici
Kazakhstan	Current; Qazaqstan дауысы. Балалар (2–); The Voice of Kazakhstan. Kids; Former Голос Дети Казахстана^{14} (1); The Voice Kids Kazakhstan	Current; Qazaqstan TV (2–); Former; Perviy Kanal Evraziya (1)	Season 1, 2017: Daniil Yun; Season 2, 2022: Ersultan Omar; Season 3, 2023: Nurshat Kusanova; Season 4. 2026: Upcoming Season	Current; Jubanish Jeksen (2–); Alem (3–); Tolkyn Zabirova (3–); Marhaba Sabi (3–)^{7}; Former; Ali Okapov (1); Eva Becher (1); Zhanna Orynbasarova (1); Dastan Orazbekov (2); Zhanar Dugalova (2); Arapbayeva Marzhan (2)	Current; Galym Kenshilik (2–); Gulnur Orazymbetova (backstage, 2–); Former; Chingiz Kapin (1)
Lithuania	Lietuvos balsas. Vaikai	LNK	Season 1, 2019: Milėja Stankevičiūtė; Season 2, 2020: Matas Saukantas; Season 3, 2021: Džiugas Joneikis; Season 4. 2026: Upcoming Season	Current; Donatas Montvydas; Mantas Jankavičius; Moniqué (3–); Former; Monika Marija (1–2)	Rolandas Mackevičius; Karolina Meschino (backstage, 2–)
Malta	The Voice Kids	TVM	Season 1, 2022-23: Dawn Desira; Season 2, 2025: Eliza Borg	Current; Destiny Chukunyere; Gianluca Bezzina; Sarah Bonnici (2–); Former; Owen Leuellen (1)	Current; Maxine Pace (2–); Former; Sarah Bajada (1)
Mexico	La Voz Kids; The Voice Kids	Current; TV Azteca (3–); Former; Las Estrellas (1–2)	Season 1, 2017: Eduardo Barba; Season 2, 2019: Roberto Xavier; Season 3, 2021: Randy Ortiz; Season 4, 2022: Kevin Aguilar; Season 5. 2026: Upcoming Season	Current; Mau & Ricky (duo, 3–); María León (4–); Paty Cantú (4–); Joss Favela (4–) ^{7}; Former; Maluma (1); Emmanuel & Mijares (duo, 1); Rosario Flores (1); Carlos Rivera (2); Lucero (2); Melendi (2); María Jose (3); Belinda (3); Camilo (3)	Current; Eddy Vilard (3–); Former; Yuri (1–2); Olivia Peralta (backstage, 1–2)
Nepal	The Voice Kids	Himalaya Television	Season 1, 2021–22: Jenish Upreti; Season 2, 2023: Spandan Subba; Season 3, 2024: Anuhya Tamang; Season 4, 2025: Sonali Rajbhandari; Season 5. 2026: Upcoming Season	Current; Pramod Kharel; Prabisha Adhikari; Milan Newar; Sushant KC (2–)^{7}; Former; Raju Lama (1)	Sushil Nepal
Netherlands	The Voice Kids; Original	RTL 4	Season 1, 2012: Fabiënne Bergmans; Season 2, 2012–13: Laura van Kaam; Season 3, 2013–14: Ayoub Maach; Season 4, 2015: Lucas van Roekel; Season 5, 2016: Ésmée Schreurs; Season 6, 2017: Iris Verhoek; Season 7, 2018: Yosina Roemajauw; Season 8, 2019: Silver Metz; Season 9, 2020: Dax Hovius; Season 10, 2021: Emma Kok; Season 11, 2026: Upcoming Season	Current; Ilse DeLange (5–8, 10–); Flemming (11–); Emma Heesters (11–); Claude (11–); Former; Angela Groothuizen (1–4); Nick & Simon (duo, 1–4); Douwe Bob (7); Marco Borsato (1–9); Anouk (8–9); Ali B (5–10); Sanne Hans (9–10); Snelle (10)	Current; Jamai Loman (9–); Quinty Misiedjan (11–); Former; Wendy van Dijk (1–8); Martijn Krabbé (1–10)
Nigeria	The Voice Kids	TBA	Season 1, TBA: New series	TBA	TBA
Peru	La Voz Kids; The Voice Kids	Frecuencia Latina	Season 1, 2014: Amy Gutiérrez; Season 2, 2015: Sofía Hernández; Season 3, 2016: Nicolás Parra; Season 4, 2021 : Gianfranco Bustios; Season 5, 2022: Gianmarco Morales; Season 6. 2026: Upcoming Season	Current; Eva Ayllón; Victor Muñoz (5–); Maricarmen Marin (5–); Ezio Oliva (5–)^{7}; Former; Anna Carina (1–3); Luis Enrique (3); Kalimba (1–2); Daniela Darcourt (4–5); Joey Montana (4); Christian Yaipén (4)	Current; Cristian Rivero; Karen Schwarz (5–); Former; Almendra Gomelsky (1); Gigi Mitre (2); Katia Condos (3); Gianella Neyra (4–)
Philippines	The Voice Kids	Current; GMA Network (6–); Former; ABS-CBN (1–4); Kapamilya Channel (5); A2Z (5)	Season 1, 2014: Lyca Gairanod; Season 2, 2015: Elha Nympha; Season 3, 2016: Joshua Oliveros; Season 4, 2019: Vanjoss Bayaban; Season 5, 2023: Shane Bernabe; Season 6, 2024: Nevin Adam Garceniego; Season 7, 2025: Sofia Mallares; Season 8, 2026: Current Season	Current; Billy Crawford (6–); Zack Tabudlo (7–); Julie Anne San Jose (6–); Paolo & Miguel Benjamin Guico (7–); Former; Lea Salonga (1–4); Sarah Geronimo (1–2, 4); Sharon Cuneta (3); Martin Nievera (5); KZ Tandingan (5); Bamboo Mañalac (1–5); Pablo (6); Stell (6)	Current; Dingdong Dantes (6-); Former; Luis Manzano (1–3); Alex Gonzaga (backstage, 1); Yeng Constantino (backstage, 2); Kim Chiu (backstage, 3); Toni Gonzaga (4); KaladKaren Davila (online, 4); Jeremy Glinoga (online, 4); Elha Nympha (online, 5); Robi Domingo (backstage, 2–4, main, 5); Bianca Gonzalez (backstage, 5)
Poland	The Voice Kids	TVP2	Season 1, 2018: Roksana Węgiel; Season 2, 2019: Anna Dąbrowska; Season 3, 2020: Marcin Maciejczak; Season 4, 2021: Sara Egwu James; Season 5, 2022: Mateusz Krzykala; Season 6, 2023: Martyna Gąsak; Season 7, 2024: Michelle Siwak; Season 8, 2025: Zosia Wójcik; Season 9, 2026: Wiktor Sas; Season 10, 2027: Upcoming season	Current; Cleo (2–); Tribbs (9-); Tomson & Baron (duo)(1–8, 10–); Sara James (10-); Former; Edyta Górniak (1); Dawid Kwiatkowski(1-6); Natasza Urbańska (7-8); Blanka (9)	Current; Paulina Chylewska (8–); Michalina Sosna (8–); Jan Dąbrowski (backstage, 2–3, 8–); Antoni Scardina (backstage, 2–); Former; Barbara Kurdej-Szatan (1–2); Adam Zdrójkowski (backstage, 1); Leon Paszek (backstage, 1); Witold Sosulski (backstage, 1); Tomasz Kammel (1–7); Ida Nowakowska (3–7); Oliwier Szot (backstage, 4–7)
Portugal	The Voice Kids	RTP1	Season 1, 2014 [pt]: Diogo Garcia; Season 2, 2021 [pt]: Simão Oliveira; Season 3, 2022: Maria Gil; Season 4, 2023: Júlia Machado; Season 5, 2024: Victoria Nicole; Season 6, 2025: Inês Gonçalves; Season 7, 2026: Salvador Rio; Season 8, 2027: Upcoming Season	Current; Cuca Roseta (5–); Diogo Piçarra (6–); Nena (6–); Miguel Cristovinho (6–)^{7}; Former; Raquel Tavares (1); Anselmo Ralph (1); Daniela Mercury (1); Marisa Liz (2); Carolina Deslandes (2–3); Fernando Daniel (2–4); Aurea (4); Bárbara Tinoco (3–5); Carlão (2–5); Nininho Vaz Maia (5)	Current; Catarina Furtado (2–); Maria Petronilho (backstage, 6–); Former; Vasco Palmeirim (1); Mariana Monteiro (1); Rui Maria Pêgo (backstage, 1); Bárbara Lourenço (backstage, 2); Fábio Lopes (backstage, 2–3); Catarina Maia (backstage, 4–5)
Romania	Vocea României Junior; The Voice of Romania Junior	Pro TV	Season 1, 2017: Maia Mălăncuș; Season 2, 2018: Maya Ciosa	Inna; Andra; Marius Moga	Robert Tudor; Mihai Bobonete
Russia	Голос. Дети; The Voice Kids	Channel One	Season 1, 2014: Alisa Kozhikina; Season 2, 2015: Sabina Mustaeva; Season 3, 2016: Danil Pluzhnikov; Season 4, 2017: Elizaveta Kachurak; Season 5, 2018: Rutger Garecht; Season 6, 2019: Mikella Abramova^{22}; Season 7, 2020: Olesya Kazachenko; Season 8, 2021: Vladislav Tyukin; Season 9, 2022: Adelia Zagrebina; Season 10, 2022–23: Anna Dorovskaya; Season 11, 2024:Vasily Igorkin; Season 12, 2025: Maria Nikulina; Season 13, 2026: Upcoming Season	Current; TBA (13–); TBA (13–); TBA (13–); Former; Maxim Fadeev (1–2); Leonid Agutin (3); Nyusha (4); Pelageya (1–3, 5–6); Valery Meladze (4–7); LOBODA (6, 8); Polina Gagarina (7, 9); Basta (5, 7–10); Egor Kreed (8–10); MakSim (10); Yulianna Karaulova (11); JONY (11); Dima Bilan (1–4, 11–12); Vladimir Presnyakov & Natalia Podolskaya (duo, 12); Aida Garifullina (12)	Current; Yana Churikova (10–); Agata Muceniece (5, 7–); Former; Natalia Vodianova (1); Anastasia Chevazhevskaya (2); Valeria Lanskaya (3); Svetlana Zeinalova (4); Aglaya Shilovskaya (6); Dmitry Nagiev (1–9)
South Korea	The Voice Kids	Mnet	Season 1, 2013: Kim Myung-ju; Season 2. 2026: Upcoming Season	Yoon Sang (1); Seo In-young (1); Yang Yo-seob (1)	Jun Hyun-moo (1)
Spain	La Voz Kids; The Voice Kids	Current; Antena 3 (5–); Former; Telecinco (1–4); Website	Season 1, 2014 [es]: María Parrado; Season 2, 2015 [es]: José María Ruiz; Season 3, 2017 [es]: Rocío Aguilar; Season 4, 2018 [es]: Melani García Gaspar; Season 5, 2019: Irene Gil; Season 6, 2021: Levi Díaz; Season 7, 2022: Pol Calvo; Season 8, 2023: Rubén Franco; Season 9, 2024: Alira Moya; Season 10, 2025: Upcoming season; Season 11, 2026: Upcoming Season; Season 12, 2027: Upcoming Season	Current; David Bisbal (1–3; (Note: David was a regular judge for all seasons of Spain's La Voz Kids, except for season 4, where he was a supercoach deciding who should proceed to the next round.) 5–); Rosario Flores (1–6, 8-)^{7}; Melendi (4–6; 9–); Lola Índigo (9–); Former; Malú (1); Manuel Carrasco (2); Antonio Orozco (3–4); Vanesa Martín (5–6); Pablo López (7); Sebastián Yatra (7); Aitana (7–)	Current; Eva González (5–); Juanra Bonet (backstage, 5–); Former; Jesús Vázquez (1–4); Tania Llasera (backstage, 1-4)
Sri Lanka	The Voice Kids Sri Lanka	Sirasa TV	Season 1, 2024: Aslam Roshan Season 2. 2026: Upcoming Season	Harshana Dissanayake Pradeep Rangana Nadini Premadasa Uresha Ravihari	Nathasha Perera
Thailand	The Voice Kids	Current; PPTV36 (6–); Former; Channel 3 (1–5); 3 HD (1–5); True4U (1–5); Website	Season 1, 2013 [th]: Kuljira Tongkham; Season 2, 2014 [th]: Pornsawun Yanvaro; Season 3, 2015 [th]: Natharika Phetfu; Season 4, 2016 [th]: Jedsada Sukharom; Season 5, 2017 [th]: Siripong Srisukha; Season 6, 2019 [th]: Mac-Sirichai Chaiyakul; Season 7, 2020 [th]: Gracy Phattanan; Season 8. 2026: Upcoming Season	Current; Tik Shiro (4–); Mam Patcharida (6–); Joke So Cool (6–); Wan Thanakrit (7–); Former; Two Popetorn (1); Zani Nipaporn (1–3); Parn Thanaporn (1–3); Sumet & The Punk (duo, 2–3); Tongneng Rudklao (4–5); Lula (4–6)	Current; Songsit Roongnophakunsri; Sawitree Sutthichanon (6–); Former; Rinlanee Sripen (1–5)
Turkey	O Ses Çocuklar	Star TV (1); TV8 (2–3)	Season 1, 2014: Şahin Kendirci; Season 2, 2015: Bade Karakoç; Season 3, 2016: Derin Yeğin; Season 4, 2026: Upcoming Season	Hadise (1–3); Murat Boz (1–2); Mustafa Ceceli (1–2); Oğuzhan Koç (2–3); Burak Kut (3)	Jess Molho (1–3); Sinem Yalçinkaya (backstage, 1); Zeynep Dörtkardeşler (backstage, 2–3)
Ukraine	Голос. Діти	1+1	Season 1, 2012–13: Anna Tkach; Season 2, 2015: Roman Sasanchin; Season 3, 2016: Elina Ivaschenko; Season 4, 2017: Daneliya Tuleshova; Season 5, 2019: Oleksandr Zazarashvyli; Season 6. 2026: Maksym Komisarchuk	Oleh Skrypka (1); LOBODA (1); Potap (2–3); Tina Karol (1–3); Monatik (3–4); Natalia Mohylevska (2, 4); Vremya i Steklo (duo, 4–); Jamala (5–); Dzidzio (5–)	Current; Kateryna Osadcha; Yuri Gorbunov (2–); Former; Andriy Domansky (1)
United Kingdom	The Voice Kids	ITV		will.i.am (1–7); Pixie Lott (1–7); Danny Jones (1–7); Jessie J (3); Paloma Faith (4); Melanie C (5); Ronan Keating (6–7)	Emma Willis (1–7); Cel Spellman (backstage, 1); Vick Hope (backstage, 2); AJ Odudu (backstage, 3–5)
United States	La Voz Kids (Spanish); The Voice Kids	Telemundo	Season 1, 2013: Paola Guanche; Season 2, 2014: Amanda Mena; Season 3, 2015: Jonael Santiago; Season 4, 2016: Christopher Rivera; Season 5, 2026: Upcoming Season	Paulina Rubio (1); Prince Royce (1–2); Roberto Tapia (1–2); Natalia Jiménez (2–4); Daddy Yankee (3–4); Pedro Fernández (3–4)	Jorge Bernal (1–4); Daisy Fuentes (1–3); Patricia Manterola (4)
Uruguay	La Voz Kids	Canal 10	Season 1, 2023: Sol Muñoz; Season 2, 2025: Valentina Sosa	Current; Agustín Casanova; Luana Persíncula (2–); Rubén Rada (solo, 2–); Former; Valeria Lynch (1); Alex Ubago (1); Rubén Rada & Julieta Rada (duo, 1)	Noelia Etcheverry; Rafa Cotelo (backstage, 1); Daniel Ketchedjian (backstage, 2)
Vietnam	Current; Giọng hát Việt nhí – New Generation (8–); Former; Giọng hát Việt nhí (1–7); The Voice Kids of Vietnam	VTV3; VTV3 HD	Season 1, 2013: Nguyễn Quang Anh [vi]; Season 2, 2014: Nguyễn Thiện Nhân; Season 3, 2015: Trịnh Nguyễn Hồng Minh; Season 4, 2016: Trịnh Nhật Minh; Season 5, 2017: Dương Ngọc Ánh; Season 6, 2018: Hà Quỳnh Như; Season 7, 2019: Kiều Minh Tâm; Season 8, 2021: Lê Đăng Bách; Season 9. 2026: Upcoming Season	Current; Hồ Hoài Anh & Lưu Hương Giang (duo, 1–3, 6, 8–); BigDaddy & Emily (duo, 8–); Hưng Cao & Vũ Cát Tường (duo, 8–); Former; Hiền Thục (1); Thanh Bùi (1); Cẩm Ly (2–3); Lam Trường (2); Dương Khắc Linh (solo, 3); Noo Phước Thịnh (4); Đông Nhi & Ông Cao Thắng (duo, 4); Vũ Cát Tường (solo, 4–5); Soobin Hoàng Sơn (solo, 5); Hương Tràm & Tiên Cookie (duo, 5); Hồ Hoài Anh & Lưu Hương Giang (duo, 1–3, 6); Khắc Hưng & Bảo Anh (duo, 6); Soobin Hoàng Sơn & Vũ Cát Tường (duo, 6); Dương Cầm & Hương Giang (duo, 7); Ali Hoàng Dương & Lưu Thiên Hương (duo, 7); Dương Khắc Linh & Phạm Quỳnh Anh (duo, 7)	Current; Thành Trung (5, 8–); Former; Thanh Thảo (1); Trấn Thành (1); Thanh Bạch (2–3); Ngô Kiến Huy (4); Thành Trung (5); Phí Linh (6); Ali Hoàng Dương (6); Thanh Duy (backstage, 2); Jennifer Phạm (backstage, 2); Hoàng Oanh (backstage, 3); Chi Pu (backstage, 4); Đặng Quỳnh Chi (backstage, 5); Gil Lê (7); Khả Ngân (7)

== Alumni in the Junior Eurovision Song Contest ==
Some of the singers who have participated in The Voice Kids have also participated in the Junior Eurovision Song Contest, a junior version of the Eurovision Song Contest.

The Voice Kids served as the national final to select the country's entrant

Country	Version	Participant (Note: Participants in bold are those who have won their respective versions of The Voice Kids.)	JESC year	Notes
Albania	The Voice Kids	Ana Kodra (Note: Competed in the contest prior to their appearance at The Voice Kids)	2017	Competed with "Don't Touch My Tree (Mos ma prekni pemën)" which placed thirteenth in the contest
Albania	The Voice Kids	Isea Çili	2019	Competed with "Mikja ime fëmijëri" which placed seventeenth in the contest
Australia	The Voice Kids	Bella Paige	2015	Competed with "My Girls" which placed eighth in the contest
Australia	The Voice Kids	Alexa Curtis	2016	Competed with "We Are" which placed fifth in the contest
Azerbaijan	Səs Uşaqlar	Sona Azizova	2021	Competed with "One of Those Days" which placed fifth in the contest
Croatia	The Voice Kids Hrvatska	Marino Vrgoč	2025	Competed with "Snovi" which placed fourteenth in the contest
France	The Voice Kids	Angélina Nava	2018	Competed with "Jamais sans toi" which placed second in the contest
France	The Voice Kids	Carla Lazzari	2019	Competed with "Bim bam toi" which placed fifth in the contest
France	The Voice Kids	Valentina Tronel	2020	Won the contest with "J'imagine"
France	The Voice Kids	Enzo Hilaire	2021	Competed with "Tic Tac" which placed third in the contest
France	The Voice Kids	Lissandro Formica	2022	Won the contest with "Oh maman!"
France	The Voice Kids	Zoé Clauzure	2023	Won the contest with "Cœur"
France	The Voice Kids	Titouan Hervo	2024	Competed with "Comme çi, comme ça" which placed fourth in the contest
France	The Voice Kids	Albert Armenakyan	2025	Represented Armenia with "Brave Heart" which placed fourth in the contest
France	The Voice Kids	Alec Burette	2026	Competed with "Comment Tu Vas?" which placed third in the contest
Germany	The Voice Kids	Lina Kuduzović	2015	Represented Slovenia with "Prva ljubezen" which placed third in the contest
Germany	The Voice Kids	Susan Oseloff	2020	Competed with "Stronger with You" which placed twelfth in the contest
Germany	The Voice Kids	Fia Marielin	2023	Competed with "Ohne Worte" which placed ninth in the contest
Germany	The Voice Kids	Arhanna Arbma	2023	Represented Estonia with "Hoiame kokku" which placed fifteenth in the contest
Germany	The Voice Kids	Bjarne	2024	Competed with "Save the Best For Us" which placed eleventh in the contest
Italy	The Voice Kids	Melissa Agliottone	2023	Competed as a duet with "Un mondo giusto" which placed eleventh in the contest
Italy	The Voice Kids	Ranya Moufidi	2023	Competed as a duet with "Un mondo giusto" which placed eleventh in the contest
Italy	The Voice Kids	Simone Grande	2024	Competed with "Pigiama party" which placed ninth in the contest
Italy	The Voice Kids	Leonardo Giovannangeli	2025	Competed with the "Rockstar" which placed twelfth in the contest
Italy	The Voice Kids	Martina Cervellin	2025	Represented San Marino with "Beyond the Stars" which placed ninth in the contest
Italy	The Voice Kids	Matteo Trullu	2026	Competed with "Che Cos'è l'Amore?" which placed eleventh in the contest
Malta	The Voice Kids	Yulan Law	2023	Competed with "Stronger" which placed tenth in the contest
Malta	The Voice Kids	Eliza Borg	2025	Competed with "I Believe" which placed eleventh in the contest
Malta	The Voice Kids	Beppe Caruana	2026	Competed with "Blue Bird" which placed seventh in the contest
Kazakhstan	Qazaqstan дауысы. Балалар	David Charlin	2022	Competed with "Jer-Ana (Mother Earth)" which placed fifteenth in the contest
Netherlands	The Voice Kids	Max Albertazzi	2018	Competed as a duet performing "Samen" which placed thirteenth in the contest
Netherlands	The Voice Kids	Anne Buhre	2018	Competed as a duet performing "Samen" which placed thirteenth in the contest
Netherlands	The Voice Kids	Maud Noordam	2020	Competed as members of Unity with "Best Friends" which placed fourth in the contest
Netherlands	The Voice Kids	Naomi Traa	2020	Competed as members of Unity with "Best Friends" which placed fourth in the contest
Poland	The Voice Kids	Roksana Węgiel	2018	Won the contest with "Anyone I Want to Be"
Poland	The Voice Kids	Lizavieta Misnikova	2019	Represented Belarus with "Pepelny (Ashen)" which placed eleventh in the contest
Poland	The Voice Kids	Wiktoria Gabor	2019	Won the contest with "Superhero"
Poland	The Voice Kids	Alicja Tracz	2020	Competed with "I'll Be Standing" which placed ninth in the contest
Poland	The Voice Kids	Sara James	2021	Competed with "Somebody" which placed second in the contest
Poland	The Voice Kids	Laura Bączkiewicz	2022	Competed with "To the Moon" which placed tenth in the contest
Poland	The Voice Kids	Maja Krzyżewska	2023	Competed with "I Just Need A Friend" which placed sixth in the contest
Poland	The Voice Kids	Dominik Arim	2024	Competed with "All Together" which placed twelfth in the contest
Poland	The Voice Kids	Marianna Kłos	2025	Competed with "Brightest Light" which placed eighth in the contest
Poland	The Voice Kids	Wiktor Sas	2026	Competed with "Gravity" which placed sixth in the contest
Portugal	The Voice Kids	Joana Almeida	2019	Competed with "Vem comigo (Come with Me)" which placed sixteenth in the contest
Portugal	The Voice Kids	Simão Oliveira	2021	Competed with "O rapaz" which placed eleventh in the contest
Portugal	The Voice Kids	Nicolas Alves	2022	Competed with "Anos 70" which placed eighth in the contest
Portugal	The Voice Kids	Júlia Machado	2023	Competed with "Where I Belong" which placed thirteenth in the contest
Portugal	The Voice Kids	Victoria Nicole	2024	Competed with "Esperança" which placed second in the contest
Portugal	The Voice Kids	Inês Gonçalves	2025	Competed with "Para onde vai o amor?" which placed thirteenth in the contest
Portugal	The Voice Kids	Salvador Rio	2026	Competed with "Alma" which placed thirteenth in the contest
Russia	Голос. Дети	Alexander Lazin	2010	Competed alongside Liza Drozd with the song "Boy and Girl" which placed second in the contest
Russia	Голос. Дети	Alisa Kozhikina	2014	Competed with "Dreamer" which placed fifth in the contest
Russia	Голос. Дети	Sofia Fisenko	2016	Competed as a member of The Water of Life Project with "Water of Life" which placed fourth in the contest
Russia	Голос. Дети	Helena Meraai	2017	Represented Belarus with "I Am the One" which placed fifth in the contest
Russia	Голос. Дети	Polina Bogusevich	2017	Won the contest with "Wings"
Russia	Голос. Дети	Daniel Yastremski	2018	Represented Belarus with "Time" which placed eleventh in the contest
Russia	Голос. Дети	Karina Ignatyan	2019	Represented Armenia with "Colours of Your Dream" which placed ninth in the contest
Russia	Голос. Дети	Yerzhan Maksim	2019	Represented Kazakhstan with "Armanyńnan qalma" which placed second in the contest
Russia	Голос. Дети	Arina Pehtereva	2020	Represented Belarus with "Aliens" which placed fifth in the contest
Russia	Голос. Дети	Sofia Feskova	2020	Competed with "My New Day" which placed tenth in the contest
Spain	La Voz Kids	Melani García	2019	Competed with "Marte" which placed third in the contest
Spain	La Voz Kids	Levi Díaz	2021	Competed with "Reír" which placed fifteenth in the contest
Spain	La Voz Kids	Carlos Higes	2022	Competed with "Señorita" which placed sixth in the contest
Spain	La Voz Kids	Sandra Valero	2023	Competed with "Loviu" which placed second in the contest
Spain	La Voz Kids	Lucas Paulano	2026	Competed with "Cuore Bello (Te Quiero, Te Quiero)" which placed second in the contest
Ukraine	Голос. Діти	Anna Trincher	2015	Competed with "Pochny z sebe" which placed eleventh in the contest
Ukraine	Голос. Діти	Alexander Minyonok	2016	Represented Belarus with "Musyka moikh pobed (Music Is My Only Way)" which placed seventh in the contest
Ukraine	Голос. Діти	Anastasiya Baginska	2017	Competed with "Don't Stop" which placed seventh in the contest
Ukraine	Голос. Діти	Daneliya Tuleshova	2018	Represented Kazakhstan with "Òzińe sen" which placed sixth in the contest
Ukraine	Голос. Діти	Darina Krasnovetska	2018	Competed with "Say Love" which placed fourth in the contest
Ukraine	Голос. Діти	Sophia Ivanko	2019	Competed with "The Spirit of Music" which placed fifteenth in the contest
Ukraine	Голос. Діти	Arina Pehtereva	2020	Represented Belarus with "Aliens" which placed fifth in the contest
Ukraine	Голос. Діти	Olena Usenko	2021	Competed with "Vazhil" which placed sixth in the contest
United Kingdom	The Voice Kids	Zena Donnelly	2016	Represented Ireland with "Bríce ar Bhríce" which placed tenth in the contest
United Kingdom	The Voice Kids	Maisie Farr	2023	Competed as members of Stand Uniqu3 with "Back to Life" which placed fourth in the contest
United Kingdom	The Voice Kids	Yazmin Asim	2023	Competed as members of Stand Uniqu3 with "Back to Life" which placed fourth in the contest
United Kingdom	The Voice Kids	Hayla-Essen Danns	2023	Competed as members of Stand Uniqu3 with "Back to Life" which placed fourth in the contest

== See also ==
- The Voice (franchise)
- List of The Voice Senior TV series
