= The Voice Kids (Albanian TV series) season 3 =

The Voice Kids
- Season 3
- Hosted by: Dojna Mema; Flori Gjini (V-Room)
- Coaches: Miriam Cani; Aleksandër & Renis Gjoka; Arilena Ara
- Winner: Altea Ali
- Winning coach: Aleksandër & Renis Gjoka
- Finals venue: Studio of Top Channel, Tirana

Release
- Original network: Top Channel; YouTube (V-Room); Facebook (V-Room)
- Original release: January 18 – April 19, 2019

Season chronology
- ← Previous; Season 2

The third season of the Albanian reality talent show The Voice Kids Albania began airing on January 18, 2019 and ended on April 19, 2019 on Top Channel, being broadcast on a weekly basis.

Miriam Cani and Aleksandër & Renis Gjoka returned for their second season as coaches, with Arilena Ara replacing Eneda Tarifa as a new coach. Dojna Mema was returning for her second season in the show but this time as a Main Host, replacing Ledion Liço. Flori Gjini was the V-Reporter and he hosted in the live shows the V-Room in YouTube and Facebook, replacing Dojna Mema. The Vocal Coaches were Kamela Islamaj (Team Miriam), Kejsi Tola (Team Gjoka) and Genti Myftaraj (Team Arilena).

Altea Ali from Team Gjoka won this season and she earned a scholarship at the Woodrow Wilson.

== Format ==
The age limit in this season being 6–14 years old.

=== Pre-Auditions ===
Cities where The Voice Kids 3 pre-auditions were held

The show began staging producers' audition days in June 2018 across the Albania and Kosovo.

Auditions with Producers
City	Date(s)	Venue	Source
Tirana	8–9 June 2018	Studio of Top Channel, Pyramid of Tirana	
Tirana	29 June 2018	Studio of Top Channel, Pyramid of Tirana	
Shkodër	11 June 2018	Palace of Culture of Shkodër	
Korçë	14 June 2018	Teatri i Kukullave	
Vlorë	17 June 2018	Palace of Culture of Tirana	
Kukës	19 June 2018	Palace of Culture of Kukës	
Pristina	20 June 2018	Palace of Youth and Sports	
Durrës	23 June 2018	Qendra Kulturore e Fëmijëve	

=== Episodes ===
Episodes		Date	Timeslot (EET)	Performer(s)	Song(s)	Source
3×1	Blind Auditions (Audicionet e Fshehura)	January 18, 2019	Friday 9:00pm	—N/a		
3×2	Blind Auditions (Audicionet e Fshehura)	January 25, 2019	Friday 9:00pm	—N/a		
3×3	Blind Auditions (Audicionet e Fshehura)	February 1, 2019	Friday 9:00pm	—N/a		
3×4	Blind Auditions (Audicionet e Fshehura)	February 8, 2019	Friday 9:00pm	—N/a		
3×5	Blind Auditions (Audicionet e Fshehura)	February 15, 2019	Friday 9:00pm	—N/a		
3×6	Blind Auditions (Audicionet e Fshehura)	February 22, 2019	Friday 9:00pm	—N/a		
3×7	Battle Rounds (Betejat)	March 1, 2019	Friday 9:00pm	—N/a		
3×8	Battle Rounds (Betejat)	March 8, 2019	Friday 9:00pm	—N/a		
3×9	Battle Rounds (Betejat)	March 15, 2019	Friday 9:00pm	—N/a		
3×10; Live 1	Live Shows (Netet Live)	March 22, 2019	Friday 9:00pm	Young Zerka	"Nuk Ma Nin" "Nona"	
3×11; Live 2	Live Shows (Netet Live)	March 29, 2019	Friday 9:00pm	Jonida Maliqi	"Ktheju tokës"	
3×12; Live 3	Live Shows (Netet Live)	April 5, 2019	Friday 9:00pm	Alban Ramosaj	"Ëndrrat e Mija"	
3×13; Live 4	Semi-Final (Gjysmëfinale)	April 12, 2019	Friday 9:00pm	Xhensila Myrtezaj	"Çelësi i zemrës" "Sekreti im"	
3×14; Live 5	Final (Finale)	April 19, 2019	Friday 9:00pm	Gjon's Tears	"Babi"	

=== Epilogue ===
Epilogue (Epilog) is a reunion show that aired one week after the Final of The Voice Kids Albania 3 on April 26, 2019 on Top Channel. The host was Dojna Mema.

== Teams ==
Colour key:

- Winner
- Runner Up
- Eliminated in the Final
- Eliminated in the Semi-final
- Eliminated in the Live shows
- Eliminated in the Battles

Coach(es)	Top 54 Artists					
Miriam Cani						
Miriam Cani	Erza Hasolli	Anisa Grenazi	Margen Ivanaj	Rron Jakupi	Noa Hoxha	Blinera
Miriam Cani	Dominik Spahiu	Rumejsa Kola	Ëmbla Qyra	Neart Myderizi	Enkela Kipti	Maria Nikolli
Miriam Cani	Majsela Kolonja	Antonella Brandonisio	Orgito Mema	Sildi Hajrullai	Samanta Voci	Gazmenda Dema
Aleksandër & Renis Gjoka						
Aleksandër & Renis Gjoka	Altea Ali	Alisja Koloshi	Isea Çili	Lolita Mati	Kejvi Boriçi	Sara Pilkati
Aleksandër & Renis Gjoka	Feride Kipti	Olta Selimi	Entela Agaçi	Deona	Enea Hasani	Kristel
Aleksandër & Renis Gjoka	Don Duli	Sara Trebicka	Alesja Klosi	Kada Bislimi	Era Okshtuni	Elma Cenga
Arilena Ara						
Arilena Ara	Anisa Shabani	Uendi Zylaj	Ermal Hoxha	Earta Gjinolli	Denisa Delia	Petro Fejza
Arilena Ara	Vullnet Haliti	Mishel Bisha	Natalia Alla	Laura Cerekja	Violeta Beshiri	Sofika Mamillo
Arilena Ara	Markus Mara	Gledis Hajdinaj	Arjola Gropaj	Dea Neli	Iris Sula	Vesa Xharra

== Blind auditions ==
The open auditions application for the third series closed in June 2018, with the age limit being 6–14 years old. The show began staging producers' audition days in June 2018 across the Albania and Kosovo, with the blind auditions beginning filming on December 16, 2018 and ended on January 6, 2019 in studio of Top Channel in Tirana.

Colour key

✔	Coach hit his/her "I WANT YOU" or "WE WANT YOU" button
	Artist defaulted to this coach's team
	Artist elected to join this coach's team
	Artist eliminated with no coach pressing his or her "I WANT YOU" or "WE WANT YOU" button

=== Episode 1 (18 January) ===
The series premiered on 18 January in Top Channel.

Order	Artist	Age	Hometown	Song	Coach's and contestant's choices		
Order	Artist	Age	Hometown	Song	Miriam	Aleksandër & Renis	Arilena
1	Rron Jakupi	12	Gjilan	"Tattooed Heart"	✔	✔	✔
2	Elma Cenga	10	Durrës	"Fell in Love with an Alien"	✔	✔	–
3	Violeta Beshiri	10	Durrës	"Bring Me to Life"	–	✔	✔
4	Matias Andel	12	Tirana	"Cheerleader"	–	–	–
5	Noa Hoxha	11	Gjilan	"Toxic"	✔	✔	✔
6	Don Duli	10	Pristina	"Shi Bie Ne Tirane"	–	✔	–
7	Ermal Hoxha	12	Prizren	"See You Again"	✔	✔	✔
8	Anisa	12	Struga, North Macedonia	"Meteor"	–	–	–
9	Gazmenda Dema	13	Kurbin	"Ëndër"	✔	✔	✔
10	Olsa & Olta Miftari	11	Ferizaj	"Wrecking Ball"	–	–	–
11	Anisa Grenazi	13	Kukës	"Friends"	✔	✔	–
12	Alisja Koloshi	13	Kukës	"Hearts Ain't Gonna Lie"	✔	✔	✔

=== Episode 2 (25 January) ===
The second episode aired on 25 January in Top Channel.

Order	Artist	Age	Hometown	Song	Coach's and contestant's choices		
Order	Artist	Age	Hometown	Song	Miriam	Aleksandër & Renis	Arilena
1	Erza Hasolli	12	Pristina	"And I Am Telling You I'm Not Going"	✔	✔	✔
2	Kejvi Boriçi	14	Tirana	"Lovely"	✔	✔	–
3	Laura Cerekja	14	Tirana	"Bad at Love"	–	–	✔
4	Sara Pilkati	14	United States	"Miss Movin' On"	✔	✔	✔
5	Marvin Gega	14	Rubik	"Prej Sa Jena Nda"	–	–	–
6	Majsela Kolonja	13	Struga, North Macedonia	"Unforgettable"	✔	–	–
7	Markus Mara	10	Tirana	"Can't Feel My Face"	–	–	✔
8	Olta Selimi	13	Gjilan	"Girl on Fire"	–	✔	–
9	Venis Agaj	11	Gjilan	"I'm a Mess"	–	–	–
10	Anabel Gropaj	7	Tirana	"What's My Name"	–	–	–
11	Arjola Gropaj	14	Tirana	"Black Widow"	–	–	✔
12	Petro Fejza	14	Belsh	"Price Tag"	✔	✔	✔

=== Episode 3 (1 February) ===
The third episode aired on 1 February in Top Channel.

Order	Artist	Age	Hometown	Song	Coach's and contestant's choices		
Order	Artist	Age	Hometown	Song	Miriam	Aleksandër & Renis	Arilena
1	Iris Sula	13	Elbasan	"You Know I'm No Good"	✔	✔	✔
2	Kristel	10	Durrës	"Crazy"	–	✔	✔
3	Xhejson Rama	10	Tirana	"Dusk Till Dawn"	–	–	–
4	Entela Agaçi	13	Fier	"Runnin'"	–	✔	✔
5	Neart Myderizi	10	Durrës	"Rockabye"	✔	–	–
6	Andeta Cenaj	13	Kukës	"Blow Your Mind"	–	–	–
7	Feride Kipti	14	Lezhë	"Dhe Zemra Ndal"	–	✔	–
8	Enkela Kipti	12	Lezhë	"Me Fal"	✔	–	–
9	Era Okshtuni	12	Kavajë	"Sweet About Me"	–	✔	✔
10	Vlera Kastrati	10	Ferizaj	"Engjelli Im"	–	–	–
11	Gledis Hajdinaj	11	Tirana	"Faith"	–	✔	✔
12	Isea Çili	11	Tirana	"Stone Cold"	✔	✔	✔

=== Episode 4 (8 February) ===
The fourth episode aired on 8 February in Top Channel.

Order	Artist	Age	Hometown	Song	Coach's and contestant's choices		
Order	Artist	Age	Hometown	Song	Miriam	Aleksandër & Renis	Arilena
1	Altea Ali	12	Tirana	"Rise Up"	✔	✔	✔
2	Vullnet Haliti	14	Mitrovica	"Mrekullia e 8"	–	–	✔
3	Rumejsa Kola	12	Tirana	"Dark Horse"	✔	–	✔
4	Sofika Mamillo	13	Përmet	"Faded"	–	✔	✔
5	Rejdi	13	Tirana	"Writing's on the Wall"	–	–	–
6	Samanta Voci	11	Italy	"Nessun Grado Di Separazione"	✔	–	–
7	Uendi Zylaj	13	Shkodër	"Unforgettable"	✔	–	✔
8	Enea Hasani	12	Pristina	"Dangerous Woman"	–	✔	–
9	Ejona Hasani	9	Pristina	"Happier"	–	–	–
10	Anxhela Mneri	14	Tirana	"Let Me Down"	–	–	–
11	Ëmbla Qyra	12	Struga, North Macedonia	"My Boy"	✔	–	–
12	Natalia Alla	13	Crete, Greece	"Me Too"	✔	✔	✔

=== Episode 5 (15 February) ===
The fifth episode aired on 15 February in Top Channel.

Order	Artist	Age	Hometown	Song	Coach's and contestant's choices		
Order	Artist	Age	Hometown	Song	Miriam	Aleksandër & Renis	Arilena
1	Deona	14	Tirana	"River"	–	✔	–
2	Antonella Brandonisio	10	Italy	"I'm Outta Love"	✔	✔	–
3	Kada Bislimi	12	Mitrovica	"Sober"	–	✔	–
4	Sildi Hajrullai	12	Berat	"Baby"	✔	✔	–
5	Beina	6	Ulcinj, Montenegro	"Gjerat Kane Ndryshuar"	–	–	–
6	Safina	8	Ulcinj, Montenegro	"Girls Like You"	–	–	–
7	Vesa Xharra	12	Gjakova	"No Tears Left to Cry"	–	✔	✔
8	Alda Cuka	12	Tirana	"Fight Song"	–	–	–
9	Alesja Klosi	14	Valias	"Skinny Love"	–	✔	✔
10	Blinera	11	Kosovo Polje	"Rise Like a Phoenix"	✔	✔	–
11	Mishel Bisha	9	Tirana	"Scars to Your Beautiful"	–	–	✔
12	Maria Nikolli	14	Shënkoll	"Your Song"	✔	✔	–

=== Episode 6 (22 February) ===
The sixth episode aired on 22 February in Top Channel.

Order	Artist	Age	Hometown	Song	Coach's and contestant's choices		
Order	Artist	Age	Hometown	Song	Miriam	Aleksandër & Renis	Arilena
1	Anisa Shabani	14	Ferizaj	"I Wanna Dance with Somebody"	–	✔	✔
2	Dominik Spahiu	6	Tirana	"You Give Love a Bad Name"	✔	–	–
3	Denisa Delia	12	Lezhë	"Radioactive"	–	–	✔
4	Erika Zdrava	10	Italy	"Uh Baby"	–	–	–
5	Sara Trebicka	8	Tirana	"How Far I'll Go"	–	✔	–
6	Orgito Mema	12	Durrës	"Ika larg"	✔	✔	–
7	Dea Neli	14	Burrel	"Sorry Not Sorry"	–	–	✔
8	Margen Ivanaj	9	Pogradec	"One Way or Another"	✔	✔	✔
9	Anais Osmanaj	11	Tirana	"Diamonds"	Team full	–	–
10	Lolita Mati	14	Korçë	"Riptide"	Team full	✔	✔
11	Nea	12	Çorovodë	"Set Fire to the Rain"	Team full	Team full	–
12	Earta Gjinolli	10	Gjilan	"Proud Mary"	Team full	Team full	✔

== Battle Rounds ==
Colour key

Artist won the Battle and advanced to the Live Shows
Artist lost the Battle and was eliminated

Episode	Coach	Order	Winner	Song	Losers	
Episode 7 (March 1)	Aleksandër & Renis	1	Sara Pilkati	"Whataya Want from Me"	Era Okshtuni	Elma Cenga
Episode 7 (March 1)	Arilena Ara	2	Petro Fejza	"Bella Ciao"	Iris Sula	Vesa Xharra
Episode 7 (March 1)	Miriam Cani	3	Blinera	"Qaj"	Samanta Voci	Gazmenda Dema
Episode 7 (March 1)	Arilena Ara	4	Earta Gjinolli	"Spectrum (Say My Name)"	Arjola Gropaj	Dea Neli
Episode 7 (March 1)	Aleksandër & Renis	5	Kejvi Boriçi	"Shallow"	Alesja Klosi	Kada Bislimi
Episode 7 (March 1)	Miriam Cani	6	Margen Ivanaj	"Treasure"	Orgito Mema	Sildi Hajrullai
Episode 8 (March 8)	Miriam Cani	1	Erza Hasolli	"Little Me"	Majsela Kolonja	Antonella Brandonisio
Episode 8 (March 8)	Arilena Ara	2	Ermal Hoxha	"Girls Like You"	Markus Mara	Gledis Hajdinaj
Episode 8 (March 8)	Aleksandër & Renis	3	Isea Çili	"Hot Right Now"	Don Duli	Sara Trebicka
Episode 8 (March 8)	Miriam Cani	4	Noa Hoxha	"Dernière Danse"	Enkela Kipti	Maria Nikolli
Episode 8 (March 8)	Arilena Ara	5	Anisa Shabani	"I'll Never Love Again"	Violeta Beshiri	Sofika Mamillo
Episode 8 (March 8)	Aleksandër & Renis	6	Lolita Mati	"Daddy Lessons"	Enea Hasani	Kristel
Episode 9 (March 15)	Arilena Ara	1	Uendi Zylaj	"Ciao Adios"	Laura Cerekja	Natalia Alla
Episode 9 (March 15)	Aleksandër & Renis	2	Altea Ali	"When Love Takes Over"	Deona	Entela Agaçi
Episode 9 (March 15)	Miriam Cani	3	Anisa Grenazi	"Good Luck"	Neart Myderizi	Ëmbla Qyra
Episode 9 (March 15)	Aleksandër & Renis	4	Alisja Koloshi	"Me Veten"	Olta Selimi	Feride Kipti
Episode 9 (March 15)	Miriam Cani	5	Rron Jakupi	"La La La"	Rumejsa Kola	Dominik Spahiu
Episode 9 (March 15)	Arilena Ara	6	Denisa Delia	"Royals"	Mishel Bisha	Vullnet Haliti

== Live Shows ==
Color key

Artist is the winner
Artist is the runner-up
Artist received the most public votes
Artist saved by their coach and did not face the public vote
Artist was eliminated

=== Week 1 (March 22) ===
The first live show aired on March 22, 2019 in Top Channel. All artists from Team Miriam sang in the first live show.

- Theme: Films and TV shows
- Opening: Team Miriam ("Walking on Sunshine")

Order	Coach	Artist	Song	Result
1	Miriam Cani	Rron Jakupi	"What a Wonderful World"	Public Choice
2	Miriam Cani	Noa Hoxha	"Je veux"	Eliminated
3	Miriam Cani	Blinera	"Make It Rain"	Eliminated
4	Miriam Cani	Margen Ivanaj	"Pretty Woman"	Public Choice
5	Miriam Cani	Anisa Grenazi	"How Will I Know"	Miriam's Choice
6	Miriam Cani	Erza Hasolli	"Adagio"	Miriam's Choice

Duets from Team Miriam
Order	Artists	Song
1	Rron Jakupi & Blinera	"Angel"
2	Noa Hoxha & Margen Ivanaj	"You're the One That I Want"
3	Anisa Grenazi & Erza Hasolli	"Counting Stars"

=== Week 2 (March 29) ===
The second live show aired on March 29, 2019 in Top Channel. All artists from Team Gjoka sang in the second live show.

- Theme: 1980s in music
- Opening: Team Gjoka ("We Are the World")

Order	Coach	Artist	Song	Result
1	Aleksandër & Renis Gjoka	Lolita Mati	"Eye of the Tiger"	Public Choice
2	Aleksandër & Renis Gjoka	Isea Çili	"Purple Rain"	Public Choice
3	Aleksandër & Renis Gjoka	Alisja Koloshi	"Holding Out for a Hero"	Gjokas' Choice
4	Aleksandër & Renis Gjoka	Kejvi Boriçi	"Era"	Eliminated
5	Aleksandër & Renis Gjoka	Sara Pilkati	"Maniac	Eliminated
6	Aleksandër & Renis Gjoka	Altea Ali	"I Want to Break Free"	Gjokas' Choice

Duets from Team Aleksandër & Renis
Order	Artists	Song
1	Isea Çili & Alisja Koloshi	"Girls Just Want to Have Fun"
2	Lolita Mati & Sara Pilkati	"Nuk E Harroj"
3	Kejvi Boriçi & Altea Ali	"Felicità"

=== Week 3 (April 5) ===
The third live show aired on April 5, 2019 in Top Channel. All artists from Team Arilena sang in the third live show.

- Theme: Top Songs
- Opening: Team Arilena ("Earth Song"/"They Don't Care About Us")

Order	Coach	Artist	Song	Result
1	Arilena Ara	Ermal Hoxha	"Apologize"	Arilena's Choice
2	Arilena Ara	Earta Gjinolli	"Ain't No Other Man"	Public Choice
3	Arilena Ara	Uendi Zylaj	"Bohemian Rhapsody"	Public Choice
4	Arilena Ara	Denisa Delia	"Rehab"	Eliminated
5	Arilena Ara	Petro Fejza	"Uptown Funk"	Eliminated
6	Arilena Ara	Anisa Shabani	"Love On Top"	Arilena's Choice

Duets from Team Arilena
Order	Artists	Song
1	Ermal Hoxha & Earta Gjinolli	"Just Give Me a Reason"
2	Uendi Zylaj & Denisa Delia	"Stay"
3	Petro Fejza & Anisa Shabani	"Moves like Jagger"

=== Week 4: Semi - Final (April 12) ===
The Semi-Final aired on April 12, 2019 in Top Channel.

Order	Coach	Artist	Song	Result
1	Miriam Cani	Margen Ivanaj	"MMMBop"	Eliminated
2	Miriam Cani	Anisa Grenazi	"Mary, Did You Know?"	Safe
3	Miriam Cani	Erza Hasolli	"Cry Baby"	Safe
4	Miriam Cani	Rron Jakupi	"Skinny Love"	Eliminated
5	Arilena Ara	Anisa Shabani	"Suus"	Safe
6	Arilena Ara	Ermal Hoxha	"I Have Nothing"	Eliminated
7	Arilena Ara	Earta Gjinolli	"Rrjedh Në Këngën E Ligjërime"	Eliminated
8	Arilena Ara	Uendi Zylaj	"Bird Set Free"	Safe
9	Aleksandër & Renis	Isea Çili	"California Dreamin'"	Eliminated
10	Aleksandër & Renis	Lolita Mati	"A Thousand Years"	Eliminated
11	Aleksandër & Renis	Altea Ali	"You Don't Own Me"	Safe
12	Aleksandër & Renis	Alisja Koloshi	"Wrecking Ball"	Safe

=== Week 5: Final (April 19) ===
The Final aired on April 19, 2019 in Top Channel.

- Opening: Finalist's, Coaches and Vocal Coaches ("Radio Ga Ga")

==== Round 1 ====
Order	Coach	Artist	Song	Result
1	Arilena Ara	Anisa Shabani	"I Put a Spell on You"	Safe
2	Miriam Cani	Erza Hasolli	"The Power of Love"	Safe
3	Aleksandër & Renis	Altea Ali	"I Don't Want to Miss a Thing"	Safe
4	Miriam Cani	Anisa Grenazi	"Hurt"	Eliminated
5	Arilena Ara	Uendi Zylaj	"I Want to Know What Love Is"	Eliminated
6	Aleksandër & Renis	Alisja Koloshi	"Back in Black"	Eliminated

==== Round 2 ====
Order	Coach	Artist	Song	Result
1	Aleksandër & Renis	Altea Ali	"Rise Up"	Winner
2	Arilena Ara	Anisa Shabani	"I Wanna Dance with Somebody"	Runner-up
3	Miriam Cani	Erza Hasolli	"And I Am Telling You I'm Not Going"	Runner-up

== Elimination chart ==
=== Overall ===
Color key
Artist's info

- Artist from Team Miriam
- Artist from Team Gjoka
- Artist from Team Arilena

Result details

- Winner
- Runner-up
- Saved by the public
- Saved by his/her coach
- Eliminated
- Not perform in that week

Results per week
Artist
Artist	Week 1	Week 2	Week 3	Week 4	Week 5	
Artist	Week 1	Week 2	Week 3	Week 4	Round 1	Round 2
Altea Ali		Safe		Safe	Safe	Winner
Anisa Shabani			Safe	Safe	Safe	Runner-up
Erza Hasolli	Safe			Safe	Safe	Runner-up
Anisa Grenazi	Safe			Safe	Eliminated	Eliminated (week 5)
Alisja Koloshi		Safe		Safe	Eliminated	Eliminated (week 5)
Uendi Zylaj			Safe	Safe	Eliminated	Eliminated (week 5)
Isea Çili		Safe		Eliminated	Eliminated (week 4)	
Lolita Mati		Safe		Eliminated	Eliminated (week 4)	
Ermal Hoxha			Safe	Eliminated	Eliminated (week 4)	
Earta Gjinolli			Safe	Eliminated	Eliminated (week 4)	
Margen Ivanaj	Safe			Eliminated	Eliminated (week 4)	
Rron Jakupi	Safe			Eliminated	Eliminated (week 4)	
Denisa Delia			Eliminated	Eliminated (week 3)		
Petro Fejza			Eliminated	Eliminated (week 3)		
Kejvi Boriçi		Eliminated	Eliminated (week 2)			
Sara Pilkati		Eliminated	Eliminated (week 2)			
Noa Hoxha	Eliminated	Eliminated (week 1)				
Blinera	Eliminated	Eliminated (week 1)				

=== Team ===
Color key
Artist's info

- Artist from Team Miriam
- Artist from Team Gjoka
- Artist from Team Arilena

Result details

- Winner
- Runner-up
- Saved by his/her coach
- Eliminated

Results per week
Artist
Artist	Week 1	Week 2	Week 3	Week 4	Week 5	
Artist	Week 1	Week 2	Week 3	Week 4	Round 1	Round 2
Erza Hasolli	Advanced	—N/a		Advanced	Advanced	Runner-up
Anisa Grenazi	Advanced	—N/a		Advanced	Eliminated	
Margen Ivanaj	Advanced	—N/a		Eliminated		
Rron Jakupi	Advanced	—N/a		Eliminated		
Noa Hoxha	Eliminated					
Blinera	Eliminated					
Altea Ali	—N/a	Advanced	—N/a	Advanced	Advanced	Winner
Alisja Koloshi	—N/a	Advanced	—N/a	Advanced	Eliminated	
Isea Çili	—N/a	Advanced	—N/a	Eliminated		
Lolita Mati	—N/a	Advanced	—N/a	Eliminated		
Kejvi Boriçi	—N/a	Eliminated				
Sara Pilkati	—N/a	Eliminated				
Anisa Shabani	—N/a		Advanced	Advanced	Advanced	Runner-up
Uendi Zylaj	—N/a		Advanced	Advanced	Eliminated	
Ermal Hoxha	—N/a		Advanced	Eliminated		
Earta Gjinolli	—N/a		Advanced	Eliminated		
Denisa Delia	—N/a		Eliminated			
Petro Fejza	—N/a		Eliminated			
