= The Voice Kids (Albanian TV series) season 2 =

The Voice Kids
- Season 2
- Hosted by: Ledion Liço; Dojna Mema (V-Room)
- Coaches: Miriam Cani; Aleksandër & Renis Gjoka; Eneda Tarifa
- Winner: Denis Bonjaku
- Winning coach: Miriam Cani
- Finals venue: Studio of Top Channel, Tirana

Release
- Original network: Top Channel; YouTube (V-Room); Facebook (V-Room)
- Original release: January 19 – April 20, 2018

Season chronology
- Next → Season 3

The second season of the Albanian reality talent show The Voice Kids Albania began airing on January 19, 2018 and ended on April 20, 2018, being broadcast on a weekly basis on Top Channel.

Miriam Cani, Aleksandër & Renis Gjoka and Eneda Tarifa were the new coaches replacing all coaches from the first season. Ledion Liço was the new host and Dojna Mema was the V-Reporter and she hosted in the live shows the V-Room in YouTube and Facebook. The Vocal Coaches were Kamela Islamaj (Team Miriam), Genti Myftaraj (Team Gjoka) and Kejsi Tola (Team Eneda).

Denis Bonjaku from Team Miriam won this season and he earned a scholarship at the gymnasium New York High School of Tirana and one Weekend in Gardaland with his family.

== Format ==
The age limit in this series being 6–14 years old.

=== Pre-Auditions ===
Cities where The Voice Kids pre-auditions were held

The show began staging producers' audition days in September–October 2017 across the Albania and Kosovo.

Auditions with Producers
City	Date(s)	Venue	Source
Tirana	9–10 September 2017	Studio of Top Channel, Pyramid of Tirana	
Tirana	14 October 2017	Studio of Top Channel, Pyramid of Tirana	
Vlorë	12 September 2017	Palace of Culture of Tirana	
Pristina	15 September 2017	Palace of Youth and Sports	
Korçë	19 September 2017	Biblioteka e Fëmijëve	
Shkodër	22 September 2017	Qendra Kulturore e Fëmijëve	

=== Episodes ===
Episodes		Date	Timeslot (EET)	Performer(s)	Song(s)	Source
2×1	Blind Auditions (Audicionet e Fshehura)	January 19, 2018	Friday 9:00pm	—N/a		
2×2	Blind Auditions (Audicionet e Fshehura)	January 26, 2018	Friday 9:00pm	—N/a		
2×3	Blind Auditions (Audicionet e Fshehura)	February 2, 2018	Friday 9:00pm	—N/a		
2×4	Blind Auditions (Audicionet e Fshehura)	February 9, 2018	Friday 9:00pm	—N/a		
2×5	Blind Auditions (Audicionet e Fshehura)	February 16, 2018	Friday 9:00pm	—N/a		
2×6	Blind Auditions (Audicionet e Fshehura)	February 23, 2018	Friday 9:00pm	—N/a		
2×7	Battle Rounds (Betejat)	March 2, 2018	Friday 9:00pm	—N/a		
2×8	Battle Rounds (Betejat)	March 9, 2018	Friday 9:00pm	—N/a		
2×9	Battle Rounds (Betejat)	March 16, 2018	Friday 9:00pm	—N/a		
2×10; Live 1	Live Shows (Netet Live)	March 23, 2018	Friday 9:00pm	Kida	"Ti" "Uh Baby"	
2×11; Live 2	Live Shows (Netet Live)	March 30, 2018	Friday 9:00pm	Eugent Bushpepa	"Mall"	
2×12; Live 3	Live Shows (Netet Live)	April 6, 2018	Friday 9:00pm	Yll Limani	"Ty" "Dritat"	
2×13; Live 4	Semi-Final (Gjysmëfinale)	April 13, 2018	Friday 9:00pm	Klinti Çollaku	"Më s’më gjen"	
2×13; Live 4	Semi-Final (Gjysmëfinale)	April 13, 2018	Friday 9:00pm	Stenald Mëhilli	"Astronaut"	
2×14; Live 5	Final (Finale)	April 20, 2018	Friday 9:00pm	Renis Gjoka	"Superstar"	
2×14; Live 5	Final (Finale)	April 20, 2018	Friday 9:00pm	Elvana Gjata	"Ti Shqiperi me jep nder" "Me Fal" "Xheloz"	

=== Epilogue ===
Epilogue (Epilog) is a reunion show that aired one week after the Final of The Voice Kids Albania 2 on April 27, 2018 on Top Channel. The host was Dojna Mema.

== Teams ==
Colour key:

- Winner
- Runner Up
- Eliminated in the Final
- Eliminated in the Semi-final
- Eliminated in the Live shows
- Eliminated in the Battles

Coach(es)	Top 54 Artists					
Miriam Cani						
Miriam Cani	Denis Bonjaku	Ana Kodra	Danjela Toçi	Stina Shala	Adolf Lleshaj	Arseldi Muca
Miriam Cani	Martina Serreqi	Hana Orllati	Desila Myftaraj	Gabriel Zaka	Erika Amankwah	Alisia Bajrami
Miriam Cani	Sibora Teqja	Jasmina Dervishi	Aulona Morina	Klaudia Thartori	Erma Mici	Anja Myrtaj
Aleksandër & Renis Gjoka						
Aleksandër & Renis Gjoka	Frensi Revania	Sindi Goma	Patris Kacurri	Sara Bajraktari	Vivian Biagioni	Enxhi Kulla
Aleksandër & Renis Gjoka	Ëmbla Elezi	Blerta Curri	Kejsi Tare	Mei Dallashi	Luisida Male	Sajana Kodheli
Aleksandër & Renis Gjoka	Petrina	Shpëtim Terolli	Tea Memeti	Sidorela Hasa	Kleansa Susaj	Anjeza Gashi
Eneda Tarifa						
Eneda Tarifa	Rita Daklani	Klea Cutra	Denis Prendi	Mejba Kadija	Eixhner Qose	Speranza Bregasi
Eneda Tarifa	Alisa Papa	Zhaklina Veizaj	Nisea Panxhi	Megi Toma	Uendi Goga	Kristel Qarri
Eneda Tarifa	Jasmina Hako	Ajla Rroji	Alina Jani	Natalia Tigani	Molos Mucolli	Xhemi Leka

== Blind auditions ==
The open auditions application for the second series closed in September 2017, with the age limit being 6–14 years old. The show began staging producers' audition days in September–October 2017 across the Albania, with the blind auditions beginning filming on December 8, 2017 and ended on December 27, 2017 in studio of Top Channel in Tirana.

Each coach has the length of the artists' performance to decide if they want that artist on their team. Should two or more coaches want the same artist, then the artist will choose their coach.

Colour key

✔	Coach hit his/her "I WANT YOU" or "WE WANT YOU" button
	Artist defaulted to this coach's team
	Artist elected to join this coach's team
	Artist eliminated with no coach pressing his or her "I WANT YOU" or "WE WANT YOU" button

=== Episode 1 (19 January) ===
The series premiered on 19 January in Top Channel.

Order	Artist	Age	Hometown	Song	Coach's and contestant's choices		
Order	Artist	Age	Hometown	Song	Miriam	Aleksandër & Renis	Eneda
1	Arseldi Muca	11	Shkodër	"Treasure"	✔	✔	✔
2	Anja Myrtaj	9	Tirana	"Reflection"	✔	✔	✔
3	Samuel	6	Tirana	"Let's Twist Again"	–	–	–
4	Sindi Goma	13	Durrës	"Something's Got a Hold on Me"	✔	✔	✔
5	Bjorni	11	Tirana	"Sorry"	–	–	–
6	Desila Myftaraj	10	Tirana	"Firework"	✔	–	✔
7	Klea Cutra	14	Debar, North Macedonia	"Unconditionally"	✔	✔	✔
8	Tea Memeti	14	Tirana	"I Can't Make You Love Me"	–	✔	–
9	Daorsa	8	Ferizaj	"Dikur"	–	–	–
10	Alisa Papa	13	Vlorë	"Sign of the Times"	–	✔	✔
11	Luisida Male	13	Tirana	"Dream it possible"	–	✔	–
12	Denis Bonjaku	13	Italy	"Warrior"	✔	✔	✔

=== Episode 2 (26 January) ===
The second episode aired on 26 January in Top Channel.

Order	Artist	Age	Hometown	Song	Coach's and contestant's choices		
Order	Artist	Age	Hometown	Song	Miriam	Aleksandër & Renis	Eneda
1	Daniela Toci	13	Kukës	"Me Ty"	✔	✔	✔
2	Stina Shala	11	Pristina	"Mamma Knows Best"	✔	✔	✔
3	Laura	8	Tirana	"Shi Bie Në Tiranë"	–	–	–
4	Elio	13	Gjirokastër	"24 Orë"	–	–	–
5	Zhaklina Veizaj	14	Tirana	"Runnin'"	–	–	✔
6	Mei Dallashi	13	Tirana	"Roar"	–	✔	–
7	Patris Kacurri	10	Tirana	"When I Was Your Man"	✔	✔	✔
8	Kejsi Tare	11	Korçë	"New Rules"	–	✔	–
9	Speranza Bregasi	13	Durrës	"Toxic"	✔	✔	✔
10	Theodhori	10	Tirana	"Touch"	–	–	–
11	Alisia Bajrami	13	Elbasan	"Je Ti"	✔	–	–
12	Frensi Revania	14	Berat	"Deeper"	✔	✔	✔

=== Episode 3 (2 February) ===
The third episode aired on 2 February in Top Channel.

Order	Artist	Age	Hometown	Song	Coach's and contestant's choices		
Order	Artist	Age	Hometown	Song	Miriam	Aleksandër & Renis	Eneda
1	Sibora Teqja	7	Tirana	"I'm Sorry"	✔	–	✔
2	Ester	10	Kavajë	"I Will Survive"	–	–	–
3	Erma Mici	14	Tirana	"You Know I'm No Good"	✔	✔	–
4	Shpëtim Terolli	14	Elbasan	"Radioactive"	–	✔	✔
5	Sidorela Hasa	14	Elbasan	"Break Free"	✔	✔	✔
6	Tomas	12	Tirana	"You Raise Me Up"	–	–	–
7	Ëmbla Elezi	10	Tirana	"Mamma Knows Best"	–	✔	–
8	Majda & Klea	12	Tirana	"Valerie"	–	–	–
9	Nisea Panxhi	14	Elbasan	"If I Ain't Got You"	✔	✔	✔
10	Xhemi Leka	10	Pogradec	"Me Veten"	–	–	✔
11	Eixhner Qose	14	Tirana	"Mercy"	–	✔	✔
12	Rita Daklani	12	Mitrovica	"Oops!... I Did It Again"	✔	✔	✔

=== Episode 4 (9 February) ===
The fourth episode aired on 9 February in Top Channel.

Order	Artist	Age	Hometown	Song	Coach's and contestant's choices		
Order	Artist	Age	Hometown	Song	Miriam	Aleksandër & Renis	Eneda
1	Enxhi Kulla	12	Tirana	"Good Luck"	✔	✔	✔
2	Erika Amankwah	9	Tirana	"Romantic"	✔	–	–
3	Erik	9	Tirana	"Mama"	–	–	–
4	Vivian Biagioni	14	Tirana	"Love So Soft"	✔	✔	✔
5	Alina Jani	13	Tirana	"Touch It"	–	–	✔
6	Aulona Morina	14	Germany	"Set Fire to the Rain"	✔	✔	✔
7	Anjeza Gashi	14	Pristina	"I Feel It Coming"	–	✔	✔
8	Natalia Tigani	14	Tirana	"Because of You"	–	–	✔
9	Flavia	8	Tirana	"Cups"	–	–	–
10	Denis Prendi	12	Tirana	"Applause"	–	–	✔
11	Leon	10	Pristina	"Baby"	–	–	–
12	Ana Kodra	10	Tirana	"Evil Like Me"	✔	✔	✔

=== Episode 5 (16 February) ===
The fifth episode aired on 16 February in Top Channel.

Order	Artist	Age	Hometown	Song	Coach's and contestant's choices		
Order	Artist	Age	Hometown	Song	Miriam	Aleksandër & Renis	Eneda
1	Blerta Curri	14	Elez Han	"Domino"	–	✔	✔
2	Jon	12	Berat	"Sweet Child o' Mine"	–	–	–
3	Mejba Kadija	14	Shkodër	"Tears"	✔	✔	✔
4	Adolf Lleshaj	14	Burrel	"That's What I Like"	✔	✔	✔
5	Molos Mucolli	13	Pristina	"Naiher"	–	–	✔
6	Sajana Kodheli	10	Fier	"Send My Love"	–	✔	–
7	Martina Serreqi	12	Shkodër	"Side to Side"	✔	–	✔
8	Endi	14	Tirana	"Mercy"	–	–	–
9	Kristel Qarri	9	Vlorë	"Try"	–	–	✔
10	Kleansa Susaj	11	Tirana	"Love Me like You Do"	–	✔	–
11	Vesa	12	Pristina	"What About Us"	–	–	–
12	Jasmina Hako	12	Tirana	"I Have Nothing"	✔	✔	✔

=== Episode 6 (23 February) ===
The sixth episode aired on 23 February in Top Channel.

Order	Artist	Age	Hometown	Song	Coach's and contestant's choices		
Order	Artist	Age	Hometown	Song	Miriam	Aleksandër & Renis	Eneda
1	Hana Orllati	11	Kosovo Polje	"Si Unë"	✔	–	✔
2	Petrina	11	Korçë	"One Thing"	–	✔	–
3	Jasmina Dervishi	13	Tirana	"Rhythm Inside"	✔	–	–
4	Sara Bajraktari	14	Tirana	"It's a Man's World"	✔	✔	✔
5	Uendi Goga	11	Tirana	"Should've Been Us"	✔	Team full	✔
6	Gabriel Zaka	13	Divjakë	"History"	✔	Team full	–
7	Klaudia Thartori	12	Tirana	"Euphoria"	✔	Team full	–
8	Elisa	10	Tirana	"My Heart Will Go On"	Team full	Team full	–
9	Ajla Rroji	11	Tirana	"Ex's & Oh's"	Team full	Team full	✔
10	Viola	14	Korçë	"Nobody's Perfect"	Team full	Team full	–
11	Ergi	12	Berat	"Nëse Thua Po"	Team full	Team full	–
12	Megi Toma	13	Shkodër	"Take Me Home"	Team full	Team full	✔

== Battle Rounds ==
Filming for the battles began in February 2018 at studio of Top Channel in Tirana, following the taping of the Blind Auditions.

Three artists from each team compete against by singing the same song. The coach of the three acts decides which one will go through and which two will be eliminated meaning that six acts from each team will get through the live shows.

Colour key

Artist won the Battle and advanced to the Live Shows
Artist lost the Battle and was eliminated

Episode	Coach	Order	Winner	Song	Losers	
Episode 7 (March 2)	Miriam Cani	1	Denis Bonjaku	"Story of My Life"	Anja Myrtaj	Erma Mici
Episode 7 (March 2)	Aleksandër & Renis	2	Vivian Biagioni	"Attention"	Anjeza Gashi	Kleansa Susaj
Episode 7 (March 2)	Eneda Tarifa	3	Speranza Bregasi	"We Don't Talk Anymore"	Xhemi Leka	Molos Mucolli
Episode 7 (March 2)	Aleksandër & Renis	4	Enxhi Kulla	"Dangerous"	Sidorela Hasa	Tea Memeti
Episode 7 (March 2)	Eneda Tarifa	5	Mejba Kadija	"Fame"	Natalia Tigani	Alina Jani
Episode 7 (March 2)	Miriam Cani	6	Ana Kodra	"When You Believe"	Klaudia Thartori	Aulona Morina
Episode 8 (March 9)	Eneda Tarifa	1	Klea Cutra	"Can't Feel My Face"	Ajla Rroji	Jasmina Hako
Episode 8 (March 9)	Eneda Tarifa	2	Rita Daklani	"Let It Go"	Kristel Qarri	Uendi Goga
Episode 8 (March 9)	Miriam Cani	3	Danjela Toçi	"Chandelier"	Jasmina Dervishi	Sibora Teqja
Episode 8 (March 9)	Miriam Cani	4	Adolf Lleshaj	"Locked Out of Heaven"	Alisia Bajrami	Erika Amankwah
Episode 8 (March 9)	Eneda Tarifa	5	Denis Prendi	"Love On Top"	Megi Toma	Nisea Panxhi
Episode 8 (March 9)	Aleksandër & Renis	6	Frensi Revania	"All of Me"	Shpëtim Terolli	Petrina
Episode 9 (March 16)	Miriam Cani	1	Stina Shala	"River Deep – Mountain High"	Gabriel Zaka	Desila Myftaraj
Episode 9 (March 16)	Aleksandër & Renis	2	Sindi Goma	"Are We All We Are"	Sajana Kodheli	Luisida Male
Episode 9 (March 16)	Miriam Cani	3	Arseldi Muça	"Beauty and the Beast"	Hana Orllati	Martina Serreqi
Episode 9 (March 16)	Aleksandër & Renis	4	Patris Kacurri	"Sugar"	Mei Dallashi	Kejsi Tare
Episode 9 (March 16)	Eneda Tarifa	5	Eixhner Qose	"Rockabye"	Zhaklina Veizaj	Alisa Papa
Episode 9 (March 16)	Aleksandër & Renis	6	Sara Bajraktari	"The House of the Rising Sun"	Blerta Curri	Ëmbla Elezi

== Live Shows ==
The live shows took place in the studio of Top Channel in Tirana, following the taping of the Blind Auditions and Battle Rounds. Each coach has advanced to the Live Shows six acts in her/their team. Each coach has advanced to the Semi-Final two acts in her/their team and the Public's votes two acts in each team. The Public's votes has advanced to the Final two acts in each team.

Color key

Artist is the winner
Artist is the runner-up
Artist received the most public votes
Artist saved by their coach and did not face the public vote
Artist was eliminated

=== Week 1 (March 23) ===
The first live show aired on March 23, 2018 in Top Channel. All artists from Team Eneda sang in the first live. The artists performed a solo song and a duet with another artist from Team Eneda.

- Theme: Music of Albania (Muzika Shqiptare)
- Opening: Team Eneda ("Ika larg")

Order	Coach	Artist	Song	Result
1	Eneda Tarifa	Klea Çutra	"Hape veten"	Public Choice
2	Eneda Tarifa	Eixhner Qose	"Dhe Zemra Ndal"	Eliminated
3	Eneda Tarifa	Speranza Bregasi	"Jetoj"	Eliminated
4	Eneda Tarifa	Denis Prendi	"Suus"	Eneda's Choice
5	Eneda Tarifa	Rita Daklani	"Vetëm një fjalë"	Eneda's Choice
6	Eneda Tarifa	Mejba Kadija	"Rrisim jetën tonë"	Public Choice

Duets from Team Eneda
Order	Artist	Song
1	Klea Çutra & Speranza Bregasi	"Ne kete nate"
2	Denis Prendi & Rita Daklani	"Ti dhe une"
3	Eixhner Qose & Mejba Kadija	"Rruga e zemres"

=== Week 2 (March 30) ===
The second live show aired on March 30, 2018 in Top Channel. All artists from Team Gjoka sang in the second live. The artists performed a solo song and a duet with another artist from Team Gjoka.

- Theme: Rock and roll
- Opening: Team Gjoka ("Kjo natë sa një jetë")

Order	Coach	Artist	Song	Result
1	Aleksandër & Renis Gjoka	Frensi Revania	"Believer"	Gjokas' Choice
2	Aleksandër & Renis Gjoka	Patris Kacurri	"I Put a Spell on You"	Public Choice
3	Aleksandër & Renis Gjoka	Enxhi Kulla	"Try"	Eliminated
4	Aleksandër & Renis Gjoka	Sindi Goma	"Paris"	Public Choice
5	Aleksandër & Renis Gjoka	Vivian Biagioni	"Confident"	Eliminated
6	Aleksandër & Renis Gjoka	Sara Bajraktari	"Cry"	Gjokas' Choice

Duets from Team Aleksandër & Renis
Order	Artist	Song
1	Sindi Goma & Patris Kacurri	"Venus"
2	Frensi Revania & Enxhi Kulla	"You Shook Me All Night Long"
3	Vivian Biagioni & Sara Bajraktari	"Total Eclipse of the Heart"

=== Week 3 (April 6) ===
The third live show aired on April 6, 2018 in Top Channel. All artists from Team Miriam sang in the third live. The artists performed a solo song and a duet with another artist from Team Miriam.

- Theme: Disney
- Opening: Team Miriam ("Dhurata")

Order	Coach	Artist	Song	Result
1	Miriam Cani	Stina Shala	"Don't You Worry 'bout a Thing"	Public Choice
2	Miriam Cani	Arseldi Muça	"Nessun dorma"	Eliminated
3	Miriam Cani	Denis Bonjaku	"Somebody to Love"	Miriam's Choice
4	Miriam Cani	Ana Kodra	"Zero to Hero"	Miriam's Choice
5	Miriam Cani	Danjela Toçi	"Colors of the Wind"	Public Choice
6	Miriam Cani	Adolf Ileshaj	"I Wan'na Be like You"	Eliminated

Duets from Team Miriam
Order	Artist	Song
1	Denis Bonjaku & Ana Kodra	"Faith"
2	Arseldi Muça & Danjela Toçi	"A Whole New World"
3	Adolf Ileshaj & Stina Shala	"You Can't Stop the Beat"

=== Week 4: Semi - Final (April 13) ===
The Semi-Final aired on April 13, 2018 in Top Channel. Each coach has four acts in her/their team.

Order	Coach	Artist	Song	Result
1	Aleksandër & Renis	Sindi Goma	"When We Were Young"	Safe
2	Aleksandër & Renis	Sara Bajraktari	"Nata"	Eliminated
3	Aleksandër & Renis	Patris Kacurri	"Jolene"	Eliminated
4	Aleksandër & Renis	Frensi Revania	"Caught in the rain"	Safe
5	Eneda Tarifa	Mejba Kadija	"My Kind of Love"	Eliminated
6	Eneda Tarifa	Denis Prendi	"Lay Me Down"	Eliminated
7	Eneda Tarifa	Rita Daklani	"Creep"	Safe
8	Eneda Tarifa	Klea Çutra	"The Show Must Go On"	Safe
9	Miriam Cani	Ana Kodra	"Dream On"	Safe
10	Miriam Cani	Danjela Toçi	"Pyes Lotin"	Eliminated
11	Miriam Cani	Stina Shala	"Praying"	Eliminated
12	Miriam Cani	Denis Bonjaku	"Applause"	Safe

=== Week 5: Final (April 20) ===
The Final aired on April 20, 2018 in Top Channel. Each coach has two acts in her/their team.

- Opening: Finalist's, Coaches and Vocal Coaches ("I Like to Move It"/"I'm a Believer"/"Get Down")

==== Round 1 ====
Order	Coach	Artist	Song	Result
1	Aleksandër & Renis	Frensi Revania	"Bodak Yellow"	Safe
2	Miriam Cani	Ana Kodra	"Refuzoj"	Eliminated
3	Eneda Tarifa	Rita Daklani	"Best Thing I Never Had"	Safe
4	Eneda Tarifa	Klea Çutra	"You Give Love a Bad Name"	Eliminated
5	Miriam Cani	Denis Bonjaku	"I Surrender"	Safe
6	Aleksandër & Renis	Sindi Goma	"Don't Speak"	Eliminated

==== Round 2 ====
Order	Coach	Artist	Song	Result
1	Eneda Tarifa	Rita Daklani	"Oops!... I Did It Again"	Runner-up
2	Miriam Cani	Denis Bonjaku	"Warrior"	Winner
3	Aleksandër & Renis	Frensi Revania	"Deeper"	Runner-up

== Elimination chart ==
=== Overall ===
Color key
Artist's info

- Artist from Team Miriam
- Artist from Team Gjoka
- Artist from Team Eneda

Result details

- Winner
- Runner-up
- Saved by the public
- Saved by his/her coach
- Eliminated
- Not perform in that week

Results per week
Artist
Artist	Week 1	Week 2	Week 3	Week 4	Week 5	
Artist	Week 1	Week 2	Week 3	Week 4	Round 1	Round 2
Denis Bonjaku			Safe	Safe	Safe	Winner
Frensi Revania		Safe		Safe	Safe	Runner-up
Rita Daklani	Safe			Safe	Safe	Runner-up
Klea Çutra	Safe			Safe	Eliminated	Eliminated (week 5)
Sindi Goma		Safe		Safe	Eliminated	Eliminated (week 5)
Ana Kodra			Safe	Safe	Eliminated	Eliminated (week 5)
Danjela Toçi			Safe	Eliminated	Eliminated (week 4)	
Stina Shala			Safe	Eliminated	Eliminated (week 4)	
Mejba Kadija	Safe			Eliminated	Eliminated (week 4)	
Denis Prendi	Safe			Eliminated	Eliminated (week 4)	
Patris Kacurri		Safe		Eliminated	Eliminated (week 4)	
Sara Bajraktari		Safe		Eliminated	Eliminated (week 4)	
Adolf Ileshaj			Eliminated	Eliminated (week 3)		
Arseldi Muça			Eliminated	Eliminated (week 3)		
Vivian Biagioni		Eliminated	Eliminated (week 2)			
Enxhi Kulla		Eliminated	Eliminated (week 2)			
Eixher Qose	Eliminated	Eliminated (week 1)				
Speranza Bregasi	Eliminated	Eliminated (week 1)				

=== Team ===
Color key
Artist's info

- Artist from Team Miriam
- Artist from Team Gjoka
- Artist from Team Eneda

Result details

- Winner
- Runner-up
- Saved by his/her coach
- Eliminated

Results per week
Artist
Artist	Week 1	Week 2	Week 3	Week 4	Week 5	
Artist	Week 1	Week 2	Week 3	Week 4	Round 1	Round 2
Denis Bonjaku	—N/a		Advanced	Advanced	Advanced	Winner
Ana Kodra	—N/a		Advanced	Advanced	Eliminated	
Danjela Toçi	—N/a		Advanced	Eliminated		
Stina Shala	—N/a		Advanced	Eliminated		
Adolf Ileshaj	—N/a		Eliminated			
Arseldi Muça	—N/a		Eliminated			
Frensi Revania	—N/a	Advanced	—N/a	Advanced	Advanced	Runner-up
Sindi Goma	—N/a	Advanced	—N/a	Advanced	Eliminated	
Patris Kacurri	—N/a	Advanced	—N/a	Eliminated		
Sara Bajraktari	—N/a	Advanced	—N/a	Eliminated		
Vivian Biagioni	—N/a	Eliminated				
Enxhi Kulla	—N/a	Eliminated				
Rita Daklani	Advanced	—N/a		Advanced	Advanced	Runner-up
Klea Çutra	Advanced	—N/a		Advanced	Eliminated	
Mejba Kadija	Advanced	—N/a		Eliminated		
Denis Prendi	Advanced	—N/a		Eliminated		
Eixher Qose	Eliminated					
Speranza Bregasi	Eliminated					
