= The Voice Kids (Albanian TV series) =

- Genre: Talent show
- Created by: John de Mol Jr.
- Presented by: Xhemi Shehu; Ledion Liço; Dojna Mema
- Judges: Altin Goci; Elton Deda; Alma Bektashi; Miriam Cani; Aleksandër & Renis Gjoka; Eneda Tarifa; Arilena Ara
- Countries of origin: Albania; Kosovo
- Original language: Albanian
- No. of seasons: 3
- No. of episodes: 45

Production
- Executive producer: Ledion Liço
- Production locations: Tirana, Albania
- Running time: 90 min – 180 min
- Production company: Endemol

Original release
- Network: Top Channel
- Release: 29 March – 24 May 2013
- Release: 19 January 2018 – 19 April 2019

Related
- The Voice of Albania

The Voice Kids is an Albanian television talent show created by John de Mol Jr. and based on the concept The Voice Kids Netherlands. It is part of an international series. It began airing on Top Channel on 29 March 2013, and ended on 24 May 2013. After four years of absence, on 19 January 2018, Top channel premiered the second season.

== Format ==
There are 4 stages to the competition:

Pre-Auditions

The first stage of the show is not broadcast. The producers of the show audition all the artists that submitted their selves through the form on the website. The selected by the producers artists proceed to the blind auditions where they have to perform for the coaches.

Blind Auditions

The second phase is the "Blind Auditions". There, the children have to sing alone in front of live audiences. The 3 jury members are sitting in a swivel chair with their back to the stage and cannot see the candidates. During the performance, they can elect to support a candidate by pressing a buzzer, which will automatically turn their seat towards the stage. The candidate continues to the next round if he or she receives at least one of the three jury votes. The candidate chooses a coach for the further rounds from all jury members who supported him or her.

Battle Rounds

It follows a training week in which the coaches prepare their candidates called the "Battle Round" third phase. In the Battle Round three candidates of the same coaching group to sing a song in the trio. Only one of the three candidates is further decision of the respective coaches.

Live Shows

The final phase are the "Live Shows" and there are six finalists per team. They sing in consultation with their coach. The coach decide for his/her/their team which two acts goes in the next stage. The audience at home can then vote on which two act has to go to the next stage.

In the semi-final phase each coach has four artists in his/her/their teams. Each act sing a song and the audience at home can then vote on which two per team advanced to final phase.

In the final stage, there's still two finalists per team. The winner will be named using televoting by the public at home to "The Voice Kids Albania".

== History ==
In 2012, along with the announcement that The Voice of Albania goes for a second season on Top Channel, it was announced that the network had ordered The Voice Kids, a junior spinoff featuring younger aspiring singers.

After 4 years on the final of Adult version in sixth season, Top Channel announced that the show comes back in Albania with a second season. After attaining high ratings, it was announced that the network had renewed The Voice Kids for a third season.

=== Selection process ===
The open auditions application for the first series closed in November 2012, with the age limit being 6–14 years old. The show began staging producers' audition days in October–November 2012 across the Albania and Kosovo, with the blind auditions beginning filming in January 2013.

The open auditions application for the second season opened on the final of Adult version in sixth season and closed in October 2017, with the age limit being 6–14 years old. The show began staging producers' audition days in September–October 2017 across the Albania and Kosovo, with the blind auditions beginning filming on 8 December 2017.

The open auditions application for the third season opened on the final of Kid's version in second season and closed in June 2018, with the age limit being 6–14 years old. The show began staging producers' audition days in June 2018 across the Albania and Kosovo, with the blind auditions beginning filming on 16 December 2018.

== Coaches and hosts ==
=== Coaches ===
Coaches	Seasons		
Coaches	1	2	3
Altin			
Elton			
Alma			
Miriam			
Aleksandër & Renis			
Eneda			
Arilena			

=== Hosts ===
Hosts	Seasons		
Hosts	1	2	3
Xhemi Shehu			
Ledion Liço			
Dojna Mema			
Flori			

Key
Main host
Backstage host

== Coaches' teams ==
- – Winning Coach/Contestant. Winners are in bold, eliminated contestants in small font.
- – Runner-Up Coach/Contestant. Final contestant first listed.
- – Third Place Coach/Contestant. Final contestant first listed.

Season	Coaches and their finalists		
1	Elton Deda	Alma Bektashi	Altin Goci
1	Uendi Mancaku; Reselda Zhegu	**Rita Thaçi**; Duan Kamberi	Elisa Kumrija; Elona Sejdiaj
2	Miriam Cani	Aleksandër & Renis Gjoka	Eneda Tarifa
2	**Denis Bonjaku**; Ana Kodra; Danjela Toçi; Stina Shala; Adolf Ileshaj; Arseldi Muça	Frensi Revania; Sindi Goma; Patris Kacurri; Sara Bajraktari; Vivian Biagioni; Enxhi Kulla	Rita Daklani; Klea Çutra; Mejba Kadija; Denis Prendi; Eixher Qose; Speranza Bregasi
3	Miriam Cani	Aleksandër & Renis Gjoka	Arilena Ara
3	Erza Hasolli; Anisa Grenazi; Margen Ivanaj; Rron Jakupi; Noa Hoxha; Blinera	**Altea Ali**; Alisja Koloshi; Isea Çili; Lolita Mati; Kejvi Boriçi; Sara Pilkati	Anisa Shabani; Uendi Zylaj; Ermal Hoxha; Earta Gjinolli; Denisa Delia; Petro Fejza

== Season summary ==
Artist's info

Team Altin
Team Elton
Team Alma

Team Miriam
Team Eneda
Team Aleksandër & Renis
Team Arilena

The Voice Kids series overview
Season	Aired	Winner	Runner-up	Third Place	Winning coach	Presenter	Coaches (chair's order)		
Season	Aired	Winner	Runner-up	Third Place	Winning coach	Presenter	1	2	3
1	2013	Rita Thaçi	Elisa Kumrija	Uendi Mancaku	Alma Bektashi	Xhemi Shehu	Elton	Alma	Altin
2	2018	Denis Bonjaku	Rita Daklani	Frensi Revania	Miriam Cani	Ledion Liço	Miriam	Aleksandër & Renis	Eneda
3	2019	Altea Ali	Anisa Shabani	Erza Hasolli	Aleksandër & Renis Gjoka	Dojna Mema	Miriam	Aleksandër & Renis	Arilena

=== Season 1 (2013) ===
The first season of The Voice Kids Albania premiered on 29 March 2013 and was won by Rita Thaçi from Alma Bektashi's team

=== Season 2 (2018) ===
The second season of The Voice Kids Albania premiered on 19 January 2018, and ended on 20 April 2018, on Top Channel. The coaches were Miriam Cani, Eneda Tarifa and Aleksandër & Renis Gjoka. The host was Ledion Liço. The V-Reporter was Dojna Mema. The winner of the second kids version in Albania was Denis Bonjaku from Team Miriam.

=== Season 3 (2019) ===
The third season of The Voice Kids Albania premiered on 18 January 2019, and ended on 19 April 2019, on Top Channel. The coaches were Miriam Cani, Aleksandër & Renis Gjoka and Arilena Ara. The host was Dojna Mema and the V-reporter was Flori Gjini. The winner of the third kids version in Albania was Altea Ali from Team Gjoka.

== See also ==
- Top Channel
- The Voice (TV series)
- The Voice Kids
- The Voice of Albania
