= List of awards and nominations received by Alban Skënderaj =

The List of awards and nominations received by refers to the awards and nominations which were received by Albanian singer and songwriter Alban Skënderaj.

== Festivali i Këngës ==
Year	Nominee / work	Award	Result
2010	Ende Ka Shpresë (ft. Miriam Cani)"	Second Prize	Won

== Kënga Magjike ==
Year	Nominee / work	Award	Result
2012	"Refuzoje"	First Prize	Won
2012	"Refuzoje"	Public Prize	Won

== Kult Awards ==
Year	Nominee / work	Award	Result
2009	"Melodi"	Best Album of the Year	Won

== Netët e Klipit Shqiptar ==
Year	Nominee / work	Award	Result
2008	"Larg dhe Afër"	Best Video/First Prize	Won
2013	"Më prit atje"	Best Story in Video	Won
2016	"Kam Nevojë (ft. Elinel)"	Best collaboration	Won

== Top Fest ==
Year	Nominee / work	Award	Result
2005	"Vetëm ty"	First Prize	Won
2005	"Vetëm ty"	Internet Prize	Won
2006	"Diçka (feat. Kthjellu)"	First Prize	Won

Top Music Awards

Year	Nominee / work	Award	Result
2016	"Alban Skenderaj"	Male Artist of the Year	Won
2016	"Alban Skenderaj"	Achievement Award	Won
2016	"Unë edhe ti"	Tar Hit of the Year	Won
2016	"Unë edhe ti"	Song of the Year	Nominated

== Video Fest Awards ==
Year	Nominee / work	Award	Result
2006	"Diçka (feat. Kthjellu)"	Best Rock	Nominated
2007	"Ky ritëm"	Best Male	Won
2008	"Eklips"	Best Male	Won
2009	"Larg dhe afër"	Best Video/First Prize	Won
2009	"Larg dhe afër"	Best Camera	Won
2009	"Larg dhe afër"	Best Performance	Nominated
2009	"Larg dhe afër"	Best Rock	Nominated
2010	"This Is Your Day"	Best Male	Won
2010	"This Is Your Day"	Best Camera	Won
2010	"Let Me Die With You (ft. (ft. Miriam Cani))	Public Prize	Won
2012	"Mirë se vjen në shpirtin tim"	Best Video / First Prize	Won
2012	"Mirë se vjen në shpirtin tim"	Best Pop	Won
2012	"Mirë se vjen në shpirtin tim"	Best Director	Won
2013	"Mirëmëngjes"	Best Pop	Nominated
2013	"Mirëmëngjes"	Best Male	Nominated
2014	"Mrekullia e tetë"	Best Pop	Won

== Zhurma Show Awards ==
Year	Nominee / work	Award	Result
2009	"Mesnatë"	Best Rock Album	Nominated
2009	"Let me die with you"	Best Rock Collaboration	Nominated
2010	"Si më parë"	Best Rock	Nominated
2012	"Mirëmëngjes"	Best Video / First Prize	Nominated
2012	"Mirëmëngjes"	Best Rock	Nominated
2013	"Nëse thua PO"	Best Pop	Nominated
2014	"Je ti"	Best Performer	Nominated
2014	"24 Ore (ft.Young Zerka)	Best Pop	Nominated
2016	"Duart lart"	Best Video / First Prize	Nominated
2016	"Duart lart"	Best Pop	Nominated
2016	"Kam nevojë (ft. Elinel)"	Best Collaboration	Nominated
