= Alban Skënderaj discography =

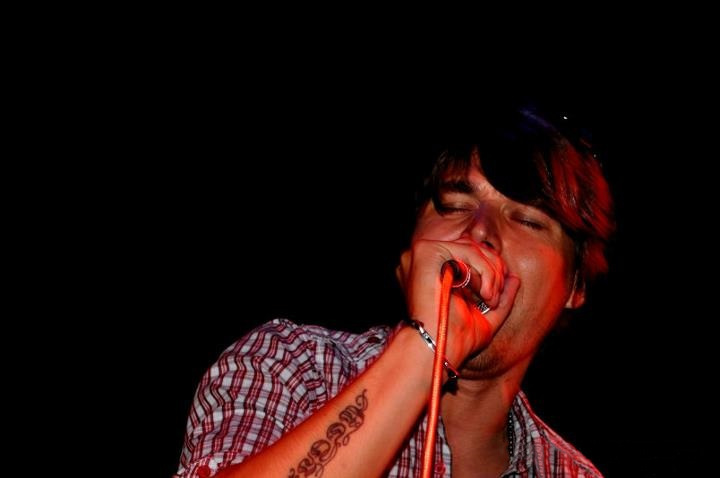
- Skënderaj in 2014
- Studio albums: 3
- Singles: 47
- Live albums: 2

This article features the discography of Albanian singer and songwriter Alban Skënderaj. His discography includes three studio albums, two live albums and numerous singles as a lead artist.

== Albums ==
=== Studio albums ===
- Fllad në shkretirë (2006)
- Melodi (2008)
- Ende ka shpresë (2011)

=== Live albums ===
Title	Album details
Tingujt e ditarit tim	Released: 21 April 2016; Label: Acromax; Formats: Digital download and streaming
Hapësira e një ëndrre	Released: 1 October 2018; Label: Acromax; Formats: Digital download and streaming
"—" denotes a recording that did not chart or was not released in that territory.

== Singles ==
=== As lead artist ===
Title	Year	Peak chart positions	Album
Title	Year	ALB	Album
"Thirrje e deshperuar"	2005	—	Non-album single
"Vetëm ty"	2005	—	Non-album single
"Diçka"	2006	—	Non-album single
"Eklips"	2006	—	Non-album single
"Ky ritëm"	2007	—	Non-album single
"Larg dhe afër"	2008	—	Non-album single
"Njëhere në jetë"	2008	—	Non-album single
"Wallking through the Silence"	2009	—	Non-album single
"This is your day"	2009	—	Non-album single
"Si më parë"	2010	—	Non-album single
"Ende ka shpresë" (with Miriam Cani)	2010	—	Non-album single
"Mirsevjen në shpirtin tim"	2012	—	Non-album single
"Mirmëngjes"	2012	—	Non-album single
"Refuzoj"	2012	—	Non-album single
"Më prit atje"	2013	—	Non-album single
"Një ëndërr" (featuring Capital T)	2013	—	Non-album single
"Nese thua po"	2013	—	Non-album single
"Peng" (with DJ Dalool)	2013	—	Non-album single
"Mrekulli e tetë" (featuring Majk)	2013	—	Non-album single
"Je ti"	2014	—	Non-album single
"Urat e jetës"	2014	—	Non-album single
"24 orë" (featuring Young Zerka)	2014	—	Non-album single
"Unë dhe ti"	2016	1	Non-album single
"Kam nëvoje" (featuring Elinel)	2016	1	Non-album single
"Duart lart"	2016	2	Non-album single
"Engjëll"	2016	4	Non-album single
"Stoli i trëndafilave"	2016	4	Non-album single
"Dikur"	2017	9	Non-album single
"1000 premtime" (with DJ Dalool)	2017	1	Non-album single
"Nuk je vetëm"	2017	1	Non-album single
"Dhurata" (with Miriam Cani)	2017	1	Non-album single
"More than a song" (with Miriam Cani)	2017	—	Non-album single
"Imagjino" (with Dj Sardi)	2018	—	Non-album single
"Ping Pong" (featuring MC Kresha)	2018	3	Non-album single
"Drejt suksesit" (featuring Noizy)	2018	—	Non-album single
"Deja vu" (featuring Young Zerka)	2018	5	Non-album single
"Lea"	2018	1	Non-album single
"Nëntor, 26"	2018	1	Non-album single
"Jetë"	2019	39	Non-album single
"Faleminderit"	2019	14	Non-album single
"Plagë në gjysmëshpirt"	2019	5	Non-album single
"Drejt në zemër" (featuring 2Ton)	2019	1	Non-album single
"Duamë" (with Miriam Cani)	2019	2	Non-album single
"Çdo ditë një Shen Valentin"	2020	3	Non-album single
"Ki mëshirë"	2020	1	Non-album single
"Parajsa ime" (featuring Elgit Doda)	2020	1	Non-album single
"A i sheh" (featuring Arilena Ara)	2020	29	Non-album single
"Jolie"	2021	4	Non-album single
"Kush ta ndien ty aromën"	2021	3	Non-album single
"Zjarr në shpirt"	2021	18	Non-album single
"Parajsa ime 2" (featuring Elgit Doda)	2021	2	Non-album single
"Zemër përmbi zemër" (with Miriam Cani)	2021	3	Non-album single
"Spektatore"	2022	1	Non-album single
"Ndalma" (featuring Lyrical Son)	—		
"—" denotes a recording that did not chart or was not released in that territory.

=== As lead artist ===
Title	Year	Peak chart positions	Album
Title	Year	ALB	Album
"'93" (Dj Olti featuring Lyrical Son and Alban Skënderaj)	2020	—	Non-album single
"—" denotes a recording that did not chart or was not released in that territory.
