= Alban Skënderaj =

Albanian singer (born 1982)

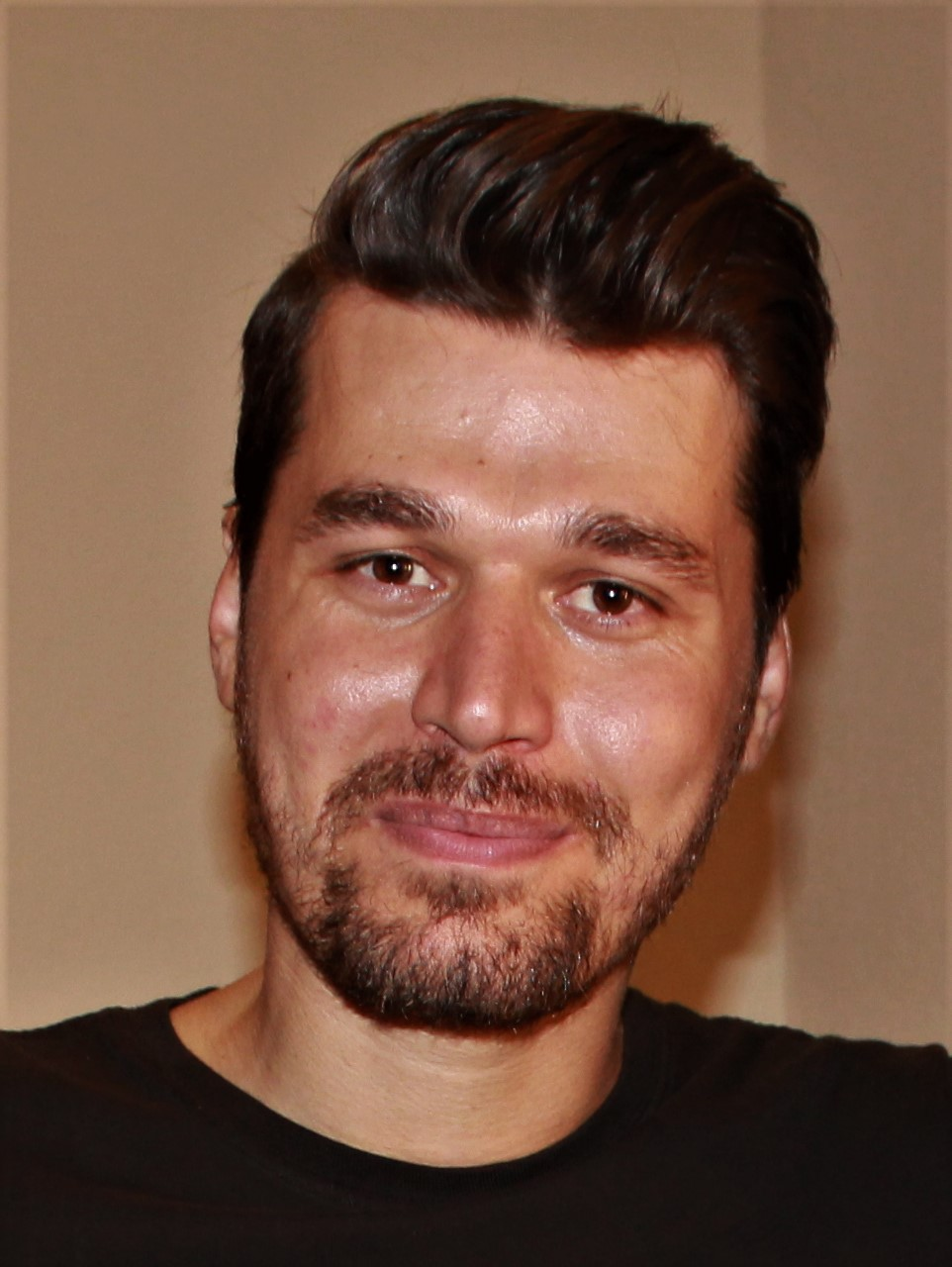
- Skënderaj in 2017
- Born: 20 April 1982 (age 44); Lushnjë, Albania
- Occupations: Singer, songwriter, actor, producer, television personality
- Years active: 2004–present
- Notable work: Discography
- Spouse: Miriam Cani (m. 2019)
- Children: 2
- Parents: Qerim (father); Afërdita (mother)
- Awards: Full list
- Musical career
- Instruments: Vocals; guitar; piano
- Label: Acromax

Alban Skënderaj (Albanian: [alˈban skənˈdɛɾaj]; born 20 April 1982) is an Albanian singer. Skënderaj has established himself as a viable artist in Albania and the Albanian-speaking Balkans. Beyond his music career, the singer has been featured as a judge on the Albanian television series The X Factor Albania and The Voice of Albania.

== Life and career ==
=== 1982–2004: Early life and career beginnings ===
Alban Skënderaj was born on 20 April 1982 into an Albanian family in the city of Lushnjë, then part of the People's Socialist Republic, present Albania. His father, Qerim Skënderaj, was born in the village of Ninësh, Mallakastër, and has served in the Albanian Armed Forces. His mother, Afërdita Skënderaj, hailed from Vlorë and died in June 2017. Skënderaj attended the Halim Xhelo secondary school in Vlorë. At a young age, his family left Albania for political reasons as part of the 1997 Albanian civil unrest and relocated to Pistoia, Italy. Skënderaj has three brothers, namely Arbër, Martin and Taulant. After relocating to Italy, his brothers encouraged Skënderaj to pursue a music career. He started to take music lessons and began to play guitar. Italian composer Sandro Bartolozzi discovered Skënderaj and invited him to the Artestudio53 in Florence, Italy, whereupon he continued to sing with various bands.

=== 2005–2017: Top Fest and Kënga Magjike ===
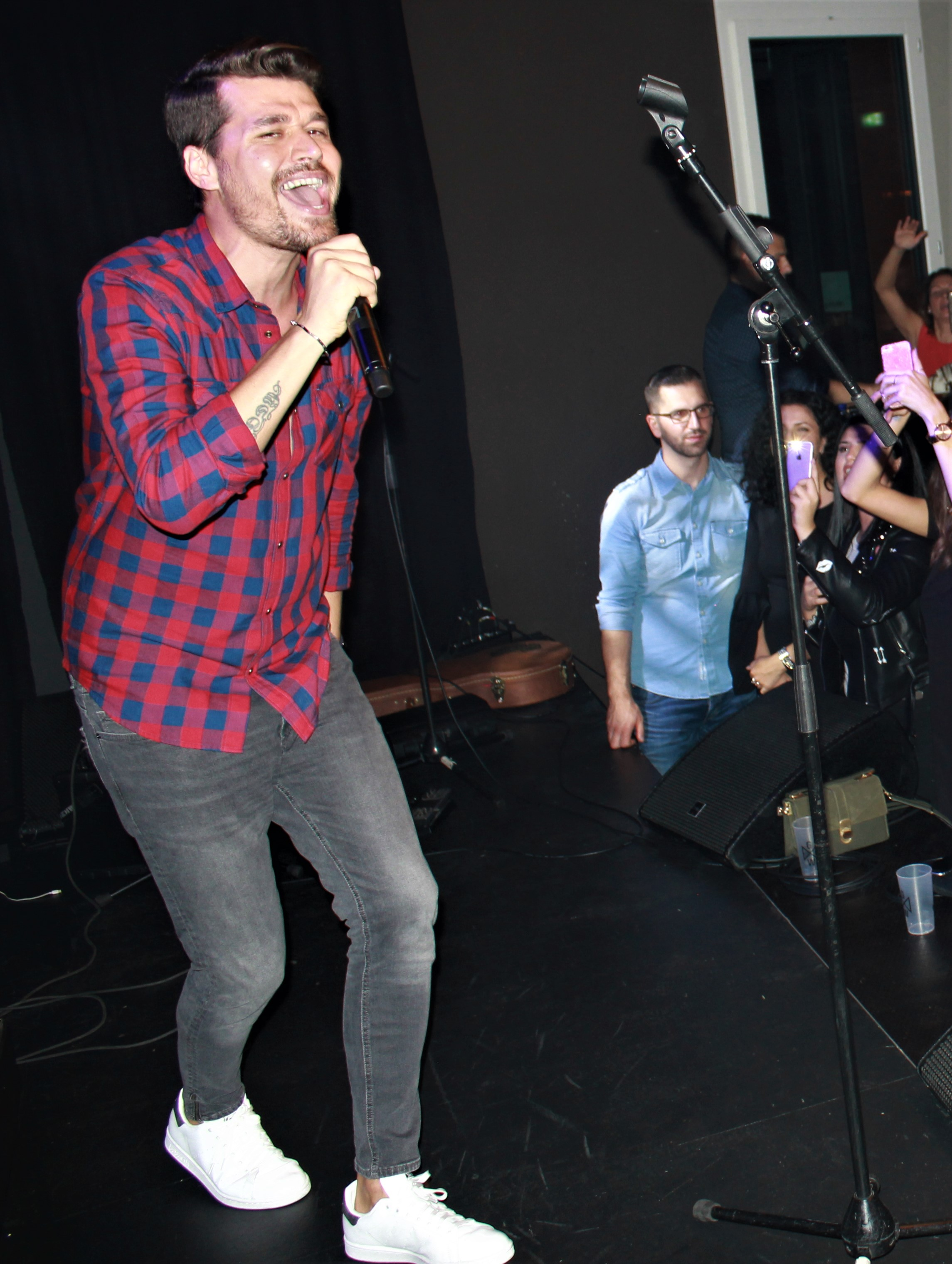
Skënderaj in 2017

After his return in Albania, Skënderaj eventually started to participate in various music contests. In April 2005, the singer won the 2nd edition of Top Fest with the song "Vetëm ty". A year after, he returned to the 3rd edition of Top Fest, collaborating with the Kosovo-Albanian group Kthjellu on "Diçka", and resulted as the winners of the contest. In December 2006, he unsuccessfully debuted at Festivali i Këngës at its 45th edition with the song "Eklips". The singer released his second studio album, Melody in October 2008. Finishing in second place in December 2010, Skënderaj returned to the contest's 49th edition collaborating with Albanian musician and spouse Miriam Cani on "Ende ka shpresë". In November 2012, the singer won the 14th edition of Kënga Magjike with the song "Refuzoj". From 2012 and 2015, he has been a juror for Televizioni Klan's X Factor Albania show. In November 2014, the singer presented a concert at the Pallati i Kongreseve in Tirana to commemorate the 10th anniversary of his music career.

Skënderaj's first number-one single, "Une dhe ti", was released in February 2016. He released his first live studio album, Tingujt e ditarit tim, in April 2016. "Kam nëvoje", his follow-up single featuring Kosovo-Albanian rapper Elinel, also went on to reach number one in Albania in May 2016. In June 2016, he was honored as the male artist of the year at the Top Music Awards. Three subsequent top 10 singles, "Duart lart", "Engjëll" and "Stoli i trëndafilave", were released in the course of that year. As of 2017, Skënderaj served as a coach on the sixth season of Top Channel's The Voice of Albania. In June 2017, the singer held a concert to further promote his first live studio album, Tingujt e ditarit tim, at the gardens of the National Library of Kosovo in Pristina. Another pair of top 10 singles in Albania, "Dikur", "1000 premtime", "Nuk je vetëm" and "Dhurata", followed throughout 2017. The track, "Dhurata" in collaboration with Miriam Cani, was dedicated to their daughter Ameli, which peaked atop the Albanian Top 100 chart. Released in 2016, "Une dhe ti" was named as the song of the year at the 2017 Kult Awards in December 2017.

=== 2018–present: Continued success ===
Skënderaj's chart appearance ensued into May 2018 with the single "Ping Pong" featuring Kosovo-Albanian rapper MC Kresha, which became a top three single in Albania. Another charting collaboration titled "Deja vu" with Albanian singer Young Zerka followed in June 2018. The follow-up "Lea" became a number-one single in September 2018 and "Nëntor, 26" experienced similar success on its release. Hapësira e një ëndrre, Skënderaj's second live studio album, was premiered in October 2018. Three subsequent top 10 singles, "Plagë në gjysmëshpirt", "Drejt në zemër" and "Duamë", were released in 2019. Released to positive response, the music video of "Duamë" comprises footage from Skënderaj's marriage ceremony in the Maldives.

== Personal life ==
After a music collaboration proposed by Cani's father, Skënderaj started a relationship with Albanian singer Miriam Cani in 2007. On 28 November 2015, Cani gave birth to a daughter, Ameli Skënderaj. In June 2019, Skënderaj presented a concert as part of his Hapësira e një ëndrre event in Pristina, Kosovo, at which both Cani and Skënderaj performed "Dhurata" and started the performance by revealing she was pregnant. Their son Duam was born on 14 January 2020.

== Discography ==
- Fllad në shkretirë (2006)
- Melody (2008)
- Ende ka shpresë (2011)
- Tingujt e ditarit tim (2016)
- Hapësira e një ëndrre (2018)

== See also ==
- List of awards and nominations received by Alban Skënderaj

Awards and achievements
Preceded by Stine with "Lady Lady"	Top Fest; 2005	Succeeded by Alban Skënderaj and Kthjellu with "Diçka"
Preceded by Redon Makashi with "Më lër të fle"	Kënga Magjike; 2012	Succeeded by Besa with "Tatuazh në zemër"
