= Renis Gjoka =

- Born: 12 May 1987 (age 39); Tirana, Albania
- Genres: Rock
- Occupations: Singer; songwriter
- Label: Independent

Renis Gjoka (born May 12, 1987) is an Albanian singer and songwriter.

== Life and career ==
Renis Gjoka was born on May 12, 1987, in Tirana, Albania. Gjoka embarked on his artistic journey by initially studying the violin for eight years and later venturing into singing. He began his career on the stage of Top Fest in 2004, when he was 17 years old, as part of the rock group Burn.

Over the course of a decade, Gjoka produced hits "Ajo", "Dashuria ime ti", "Sot", "I'a mbathim bashke" and "Superstar", all songs acclaimed with numerous awards in music competitions. He participated in the 52nd edition of Festivali i Kenges with the song "Mjegulla".

Collaborations with Aleksandër Gjoka have included the songs "I njëjti do të mbetem" and "Jam i pari i jetes time" as part of rock group Burn.

In 2012, Gjoka released the song "Une dhe Gogoli", a critically acclaimed composition that explores the perspective of an autistic boy who perceives reality in a unique and distinct manner. The writer Edmond Tupja, whose son is affected by autism, wrote the lyrics of the song.

In 2016, Gjoka emerged triumphant representing Albania in the Balkanic Rock Music Festival held in Bulgaria securing the 1st prize at the festival. The accomplishment comes on the heels of his participation in the International music festival "New Music," also hosted in Bulgaria.

In 2023, Gjoka started a podcast called "Garage Lock", a collaboration with fellow rock vocalist Eugent Bushpepa. The duo delves into the world of spoken dialogue and candid conversations engaging with guests from various walks of life. The two artists have joined forces on various musical projects, among them "Rezisto", a track chosen as the official campaign song for the 2023 Albanian local elections by the Together We Win coalition.
