= Miriam Cani =

Albanian pop singer (born 1985)

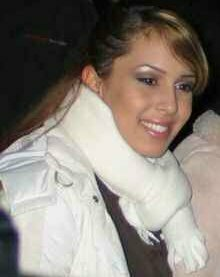
- Cani in 2005
- Born: 30 May 1985 (age 40); Elbasan, Albania
- Occupation: Singer
- Years active: 2003–present
- Spouse: Alban Skënderaj (m. 2019)
- Children: 2
- Musical career
- Genres: Pop
- Instruments: Vocals
- Formerly of: Preluders

Miriam Cani (Albanian: [miˈɾiam tsaˈni]; born 30 May 1985) is an Albanian singer. She was a member of the successful German pop girl group Preluders. Beyond her music career, Cani has been featured as a judge on the Albanian television talent competition series The X Factor Albania, The Voice of Albania and The Voice Kids Albania.

== Life and career ==
In 2003, Miriam Cani along with 13 other participants auditioned for a spot in the German version of the talent show Popstars and in the end she was voted as one of the winners and became a member of the girl group Preluders. Cani made her first TV appearance in Germany in 1993 in the show "Interaktiv". She participated in the musical "Hair" in Germany and also in the musical ''Ludwig 2" in 2013 in Germany, and in the musical "Chicago" in Albania, where she played the main role, Roxie Hart. As a television host she hosted Jamba TV Clip Clash and Eclips in Germany, and Festivali i Këngës in Albania. She sang in the FilmHarmonic Night in Germany, and also performed her single Bring the Rain in Fernsehgarten.

She presented the Albanian national final for the Eurovision Song Contest 2010. Cani herself participated in the Albanian national final for the Eurovision Song Contest 2011 in Germany with the entry "Ende ka shpresë" in a duet with singer Alban Skënderaj, now her husband.

== Personal life ==
After a music collaboration proposed by her father, Cani started a relationship with Albanian singer Alban Skënderaj in 2007. On 28 November 2015, Cani gave birth to a daughter, Ameli Skënderaj, on the occasion of Albania's 103rd independence day. In June 2019, Skënderaj presented a concert as part of his Hapësira e një ëndrre event in Pristina, Kosovo, at which both Skënderaj and Cani performed "Dhurata" and started the performance by revealing she was pregnant. Their son named Duam Skënderaj was born on 14 January 2020.

== Discography ==
- 2005: Shko
- 2005: Belong
- 2006: One Goal
- 2006: Don't Surrender (feat. Alketa Vejsiu)
- 2007: When a Devil Loves an Angel
- 2009: Let Me Die With You (feat. Alban Skënderaj)
- 2010: Mos më ndal
- 2010: Ende ka shpresë (feat. Alban Skënderaj)
- 2011: Somebody Hurts (feat. Alban Skënderaj)
- 2012: Përgjithmonë
- 2013: Ti s'e di përse
- 2013: I paprekshëm
- 2013: Labirint
- 2014: Shiu im
- 2014: Bring the Rain
- 2017: Meteor
- 2017: Dhurata (feat. Alban Skënderaj)
- 2017: More Than a Song (feat. Alban Skënderaj)
- 2018: Radio Silence
- 2018: Në parajsë
- 2019: Duamë (feat. Alban Skënderaj)
