= Mass media in Albania =

Mass media in Albania refers to mass media outlets based in Albania. Television, magazines, and newspapers are all operated by both state-owned and for-profit corporations which depend on advertising, subscription, and other sales-related revenues. The Constitution of Albania guarantees freedom of speech and freedom of the press, although the current socialist government led by Edi Rama generally does not respect these rights in practice. An overwhelming majority of the largest media in Albania are pro-government and actively censor any information critical and negative about it. The government and businesses actively influence and pressure the media. There are government restrictions on access to the Internet, such as the ban on TikTok.

== Legislative framework ==
The Constitution of Albania provides for freedom of speech and freedom of the press. However, there are reports that the government and businesses influence and pressure the media. The constitution and law prohibit arbitrary interference with privacy, family, home, or correspondence. There are government restrictions on access to the Internet, such as TikTok.

The Constitution of Albania prohibits censorship and grants citizens the right to access to information: every citizen has the right, in accordance with the law, to acquire information on the activities of state bodies and persons exercising public functions.

The print press in Albania is mostly self-regulated. The Law on the Press only states that "The press is free. Freedom of the press is protected by law". Printed publications do not require authorisation, nor are they registered in number at any time.

As part of its proposed accession to the European Union, Albania has cooperated with the European Commission on media and broadcasting policy. In 2010, it issued an opinion that the country was "facing serious issues with regard to media freedom and independence resulting from the lack of independence from political and business actors". A 2011 law adopted the EU Audiovisual Media Services Directive, although the then-previous ruling party was criticised for allowing political control over the Audiovisual Media Authority and failing to ensure its independence.

During election campaigns, as stated by the Election Law, TV and radio coverage (but not the press) needs to be balanced. Yet, the two main parties are allocated double the time than the other smaller parties. The Central Election Commission forms a Media Monitoring Board, composed of party representatives (but excluding smaller and newer parties), and tasked with punishing non-compliant outlets with (rather small) fines.

Libel and defamation were decriminalised in March 2012, but remain punishable by high fines - something which is deemed reinforcing trends of self-censorship among journalists. Since 2005, the government and the public administration have pledged not to sue journalists. Since 2013, a Ministerial Code asks ministers not to sue journalists without the prime minister approval, or face the risk of removal. The number of civil cases has dropped, but the formula is not yet entrenched.

Access to information is guaranteed by law since 1999, though implementation lags behind. A 2014 law aimed to prevent delays in officials' answers to access requests. Institutions should appoint coordinators, and a Commission for the Right to Information is tasked to monitor compliance.

Online contents are lightly regulated. The only prosecuted contents are those concerning genocide or crimes against humanity, as well as provocation of ethnic, religious or other hate. The Chief Prosecutor may and should collect all relevant content.

Setting up a website requires a permit by the Authority on Electronic and Postal Communication (AKEP), responsible for the technical regulation of online media.

=== Regulatory authorities ===
The Audiovisual Media Authority (AMA) is the main media regulator in Albania, replacing the previous National Council of Radio and Television (KKRT). The AMA is tasked with issuing broadcasting licenses and monitoring their use. It is funded through fines, annual licenses and fees, though it can also receive public budget money. It 5 members are elected by the Parliament for 5 years for maximum two terms. Civil society organisations propose names of experts, which MPs from majority and opposition then shortlist and elect (3 each). The 7th member, the AMA Chairman, is elected by the Parliamentary majority.

The AMA is commonly considered as highly politicised. After a long in-fight, two members and a new chairman were elected in late 2014, but the opposition boycotted the vote and did not recognise its outcomes.

=== Status and self-regulation of journalists ===
The Ethical Code of the Albanian Media Institute, created in 1996 and revised in 2006, states that journalists "have the right to obtain information, to publish, and to criticise. Information should be truthful, balanced and verified.

The Albanian journalism labour market is unstable and journalists often work without contracts (90% of them, according to a 2012 study of the Albanian Media Institute) or for unpaid extra hours, facing delayed salary payment (up to in 70% of cases). The lack of professional stability undermines motivation and security, and push towards either self-censorship or business and political interferences. Existing journalists' labour unions are not very active in defending journalists' rights. Average salaries for journalists in Tirana are 300–600 euros; journalists outside the capital are paid even less, and 60% of them do not reach the national average wage. Media owners often fail to respect the Law on Work Insurance. Journalist may find themselves forced to take up second jobs, with possible conflicts of interests.

The lack of resources hinders the development of professionalism and quality journalism. Journalists often can only refer to official statements and phone calls; investigative journalism is rare. The professional culture is still very influenced by the socialist times.

Journalists in Albania remain at risk of being physically obstructed, assaulted or threatened while covering specific events. In June 2014 criminal gangs shot at an A1 Report TV crew, with a vehicle torched and a journalist shortly taken hostage, during a police raid on a village involved in drug-trafficking.

== Censorship ==
Despite some positive developments in the Albania media system since the fall of the Communist regime, such as the creation of a pluralistic media scene, the increase of the number of media outlets, the diversification of formats and the development of digital media, the reduction of physical attacks against journalists and the improvement of the legal framework, censorship and self-censorship are still present in the Albanian media environment. They come from political and economic pressures, lack of financial viability for media outlets, lack of professionalism, ethics and of respect for journalists’ rights. Links between politics, business and media undermine journalistic excellence and quality of reporting in the Albanian media and generate censorship and self-censorship among journalists. One of the main reason of this concerns media ownership structures and patterns: many businessmen in Albania have become media owners, thus their media outlets are kept alive by their business earnings, while maintaining close relationships with politicians.

According to a 2015 report by the Balkan Investigative Journalism Network (BIRN) Albania, media professionals in Albania act under the strong influence of factors such as pressure from public institutions, pressure through state-sponsored advertising, pressure from big advertisers, but also pressure from owners’ economic interests, owners’ political links. All these facts also affect the editorial policy that media organisations follow. More than half of the respondents to the 2015 BIRN study report that the editorial line in the media outlets they work for is easily influenced by different factors, including owners’ economic interests, “outside pressures and interventions”, etc.

According to BIRN, the media editorial policy is often perceived by Albanian journalists as political biased; it is report that it is have been evident to journalists before they joined the media outlet, or was transmitted informally after they joined the media organisation through orders from owners and editors, censorship of news or suggestions from colleagues. These pressures inside a media organisation to enforce the editorial policy imposed by the owners influence media coverage and the choice of news to be published, as well as the avoidance of others, and result in “one-sided news coverage”, “positive/PR coverage of political and financial partners” and “lack of critical and investigative journalism”.

As a result of all these pressures, self-censorship is a widespread phenomenon in the Albanian media. More than 70% of the media professionals involved in the BIRN study believe that journalists in Albania avoid to cover and report of certain stories and issues. Also, half around of the respondents admitted that they avoided certain news “often” or even “very often”. The issues more frequently avoided concern politics, organised crime and economy.

According to BIRN, the main factors pushing journalists toward del-censorship are reported to "the economic and political interests of media owners", a problem closely connected with the system of media ownership and financing, the “lack of physical security”, and the lack of “job security”.

During August 2019, Council of Europe issued an alert regarding censorship on Albanian media. This alert was brought after the shutdown of two talk-shows, both critical towards the Socialist Party government.

The shut down was criticized by many local and international organizations working on the journalists and media rights. News 24 announced the closure of both talk shows, Ylli Rakipi’s “The Unexposed Ones” and Adi Krasta’s “Krasta/ A Show”.

== Media outlets ==
Albanian media are mainly funded through advertising revenues, which lack transparency, coupled with sponsorships and the sale of media productions.

The law does not regulate state aid for the media, yet, the opacity inallocation of state advertising is a persistent source of controversy. The economic crisis has reduced the share of advertising revenues of broadcasters (from 58% in 2009 to 30% in 2010), making the media more and more reliant on direct financing by media owners, and equally more at risk of business and political interferences.

Foreign investors have entered the Albanian media market lately, with the Italian Edisud Group and the German WAZ–Mediengruppe ratcheting up local media. Media ownership concentration is not yet deemed a problem, although ownership is often obscured through proxies. Cross-ownership is nevertheless on the rise. Economic cross interests of media owners also threaten the media independence.

Partisan bias is particularly visible at electoral time, and self-censorship remains a concern. The market conditions also discourage investigative reporting.

Transparency is lacking in the state funds to the media sector. The unfair distribution of state advertising to the Albanian media has been a recurrent concern. The issue is not explicitly regulated.

- In 2012/2013 over 780,000 euros were reported to be channeled to the media, the biggest share going to a single media group, owned by Rezart Taci, deemed favourable to the government.
- The PD government allegedly channeled state advertisement funds towards friendly media outlets, and continued doing so even after 2014 through the city government of Tirana. According to BIRN, in the first three quarters of 2014 the Tirana administration accounted for 64.5% of all print advertisement spending by Albanian state institutions.

=== Print media ===
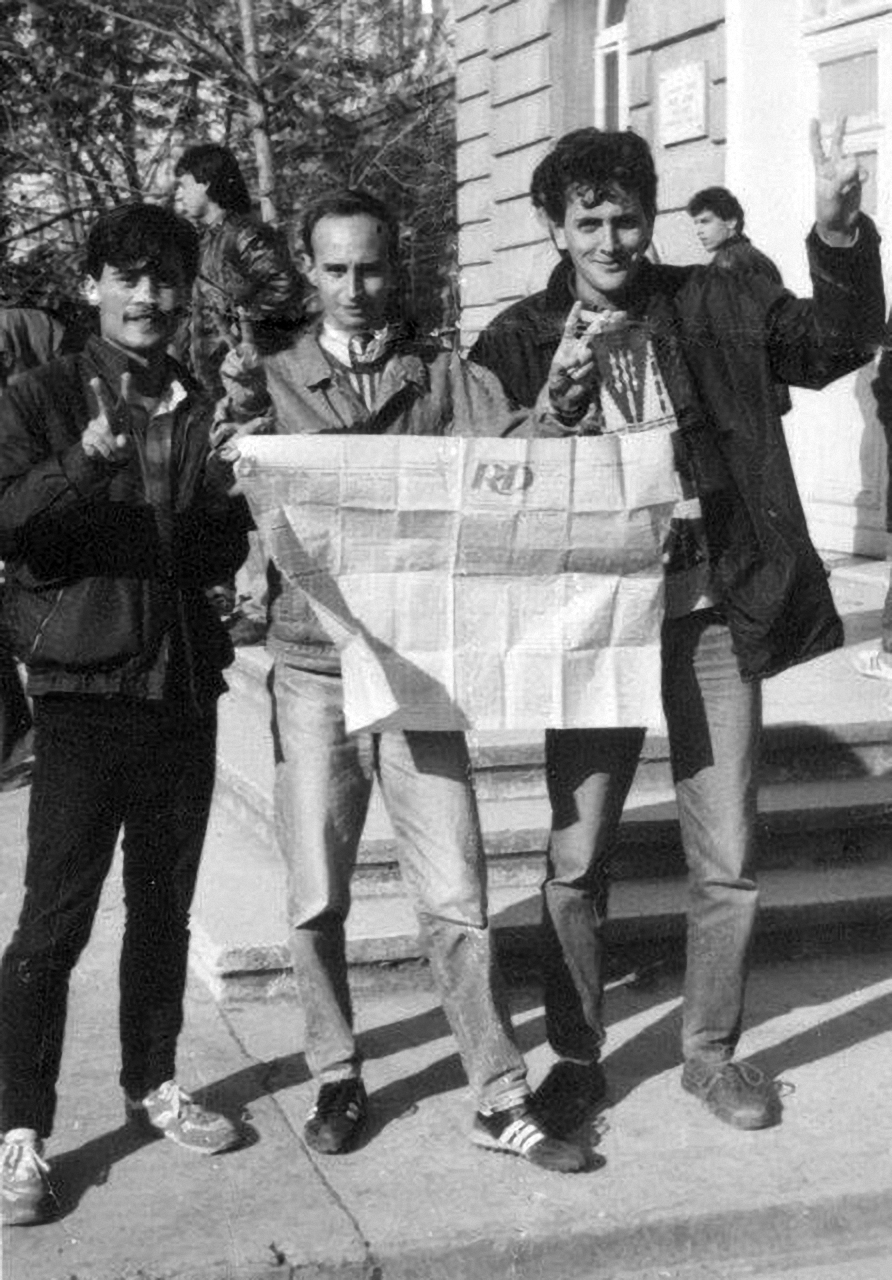
First copy of Rilindja Demokratike newspaper on 5 January 1991

Albanian language newspapers were banned during Ottoman times. Publications in Albanian from other parts of the Empire (Sofia, Bucarest, Thessaloniki, Athens, Istanbul) were smuggled in the region. After independence in 1912, news publications included Koha ("The Times", 1920–26), Demokratia (1925–39), and Drita ("The Light", 1936–39). Socialist Albania saw Zëri i Popullit ("The People's Voice", 1944) as the official propaganda publication of the Albanian Party of Labor; the newspaper remained during democratisation as the organ of the Socialist Party of Albania. Rilindja Demokratike ("Democratic Rebirth", 1991) was founded as the first opposition newspaper.

Newspapers have remained mostly free after 1991 in Albania—with the partial exception of the 1994–97 period under Sali Berisha's Democratic Party of Albania. Investigative journalism though has remained rare, and journalists inquiring episodes of corruption are often harassed. Most newspapers remain linked to business and political interest groups, since they could not fund themselves simply with the sale of low numbers of copies.

The number of newspapers in Albania was nearly 92 in 2001 and 98 in 2002. Ownership links and financial dependence on business and political tycoons limits journalistic quality and independence, and fosters sensationalism and commercialisation.

The independent Koha Jonë is the daily with the biggest readership, although no official numbers are available. Circulation is deemed the lowest in Europe.

Tirana's main newspapers are Albania, Balkan, Gazeta Shqiptare, Gazeta 55, Koha Jonë, Metropol, Panorama, Rilindja Demokratike, Shekulli, Shqip, Tema. Numerous other dailies and weeklies provide regional and local information. English-language news are provided by the Albanian Mail and the Tirana Times. Greek-language newspapers include Dimotiki Foni, Dris, Foni tis Omonoias, Laiko Vima, Provoli, and Romiosini. Gazeta 2000 publishes in Albanian, Greek, and English.

Web-based independent media have emerged. Lapsi (Pencil) was created in 2014 by journalists Andi Bushati and Armand Shkullaku. Citizens.al was founded in 2016 and is an NGO and independent media outlet.

The state's news agency is the Albanian Telegraphic Agency (ATSH)

=== Publishing ===
INSTAT counted in 2012 around 100 publishing houses and 380 printing presses in Albania, with an average yearly production of 1200–1500 titles. The main challenges of the sector concern the high production costs, lack of promotion, lack of a solid distribution network. The economic crisis seriously affected the publishing sector, with the closure of bookshops and publishing houses, according to the Albanian Association of Publishers (SHBSH), that reported a 40% drop in book sales in 2015.

Publishing houses in Albania include:

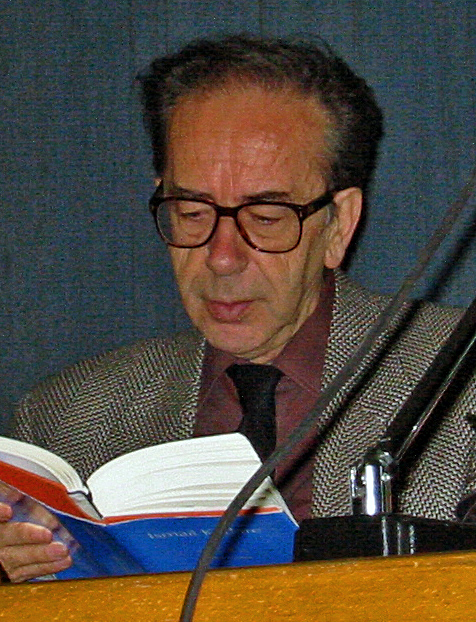
Ismail Kadare

- Onufri Publishing House, established in 1992, publisher of the complete works of Ismail Kadare and Martin Camaj, as well as several foreign classics
- Ombra GVG Publishing House, publishing i.a. Margaret Mazzantini, Antonio Tabucchi, Dino Buzzati, Bernard Cromwell, Edmond Tupja
- Neraida Publishing House, founded in 2002, specialising in children's literature and publishing classical and contemporary Greek literature
- Dituria Publishing House, publishing non-fiction books since 1991
- Argeta-LMG Publishing House (established 1996), specialised in national historical works, dealing with the history, language, culture and tradition of the Albanian people, including publications of authors from Kosovo.
- Toena (est. 1993, publisher of Rexhep Qosja),
- Pika pa sipërfaqe (est. 2009) a small and well-recognized publishing house publishing translations of foreign literature and essays as well as original works by Albanian authors. Their story and role in the Albanian society is told by ethnographer Matthew Rosen in "Tirana Modern: Biblio-Ethnography on the Margins of Europe" (2022).
- others: Plejad (with its philosophy series), Dita2000, UET, Shtepia Botuese 55, Mediaprint, Ombra, Dudaj (publishing Italian writers), Saras

=== Public service broadcaster ===
The state broadcaster in Albania, Radio Televizioni Shqiptar (RTSH, Albanian Radio and TV), operates national radio and television networks. It has competition from scores of privately owned stations. According to a 2002 survey the broadcaster with the largest audience is TV Klan.

The Audio-Visual Media Law states that RTSH should "promote Albanian culture and language, and artistic and literary creativity"; produce and broadcast freely accessible content, "related to national health and public order, as well as in cases of national emergencies". Original content should amount to 50% of the broadcasts. To promote pluralism, RTSH broadcasts in minority languages (Greek and Macedonian) in the border regions.

RTSH Steering Council's members are elected with a procedure similar to those of AMA, thus reinforcing the issue of politicisation and lack of independence. The OSCE has remarked serious problems with the balance of RTSH coverage during the 2013 electoral period. The public broadcaster finds it difficult to respect the balance in time allotment as required by the Electoral Code. RTSH typically shows a strong pro-governmental bias.

The Steering Council approves the RTSH statutes and appoints/dismisses its directors; "approving the strategy, organisational structure, and program structure; monitoring the impartiality, objectivity, and comprehensiveness of programming; advising and assisting the Director General in carrying out his program responsibilities; and drafting the annual report on RTSH activities for submission to Parliament".

RTSH finances itself through a license fee (€0.75 per month per family) and may receive funds from advertising, third party services (including productions), performances, donations and sponsorships (upon approval of the Steering Council), and the sale of programmes.

=== Radio broadcasting ===
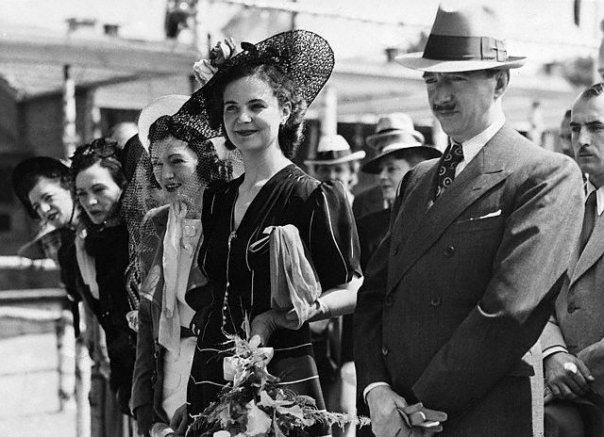
King Zog and Queen Geraldine Apponyi (here on a picture from 1939) launched Radio Tirana in 1938.

Albania hosts 2 public radio networks and roughly 25 private radio stations. Several international broadcasters are available (as of 2010).

The radio stations with nationwide coverage include the three public channels (Radio Tirana 1, 2, and 3), Top Albania Radio, Club FM, and Radio Klan. Other radio stations broadcast locally or over the internet.

The BBC World Service (103.9 MHz in the capital, Tirana), Radio France Internationale, and China Radio International are available as of 2019. The BBC Albanian service operated from 1940 to 1967 and from 1993 to 2011.

=== Television broadcasting ===
Television is the most influential medium in Albania. The country hosts 3 public TV networks (one of which broadcasts by satellite to Albanian-language communities in neighboring countries) and more than 60 private TV stations; cable TV service is available (2010); Besides the public service broadcaster RTSH, nationwide TV channels include Top Channel, TV Klan, and Vizion Plus. Some national channels now defunct include: TVA, Albanian Screen, and Agon Channel. Tirana-based channels are mainly all news or music format and include Ora News, News24, Top News, A1 Report, ABC News, UTV, Super Sonic TV, BBF, Channel 1, and TeleSport.

Many Albanians watch Rai and ANT1 Greece via terrestrial reception. TV5Monde Europe is also available as foreign relay.

Television was first introduced in 1960. The state-owned RTSH dominated the Albanian broadcasting field up to the mid-1990s, a period when privately owned radio and TV stations started to occupy the vastly empty Albanian frequencies. Albania has also been a broadcasting centre for its neighbouring countries, with Klan Kosova (for Kosovo), Klan Macedonia and Alsat M (for North Macedonia) and defunct Agon Channel Italia (for Italy). Transition to DTV broadcasting is stalling.

In the early 2000s, Albanians living in the United States had created the first IPTV platform in North America and later in Europe to stream Albanian TV content to all Albanians living in the United States and Canada. It was launched as an alternative for Albanian expats living abroad to view content from Albania, Kosovo, Montenegro and Macedonia.

=== Cinema ===
The cinema of Albania had its start in the years 1911—1912, with the first showings of foreign film, and the recording of few documentaries in the pre-war and inter-war period.

During socialist times, the Albafilm-Tirana was founded with Soviet assistance, focusing mostly on propaganda of wartime struggles. Growing isolationism in the 1970s and 1980s stifled cinematographic imports and fostered domestic productions, which was diversified to various genres, including cultural documentaries and animated films. By 1990, about 200 movies had been produced, and Albania had over 450 theatres, though most of the equipment was obsolete.

With the economic transition in the 1990s, Kinostudio was broken up and privatised. A new National Center of Cinematography was established, while cities built modern cinema theatres catering mostly US movies to the public.

=== Telecommunications ===
Until 1990, Albania was one of the world's most isolated and controlled countries, and installation and maintenance of a modern system of international and domestic telecommunications was precluded. Albania's telephone density was the lowest in Europe, and callers needed operator assistance even to make domestic long-distance calls.

Despite investments, the density of fixed lines remains the lowest in Europe; however, mobile phone service has been available since 1996; cellular use is widespread and generally effective; multiple companies provide mobile services and mobile teledensity had reached 100%; international traffic is carried by fiber-optic cable and, when necessary, by microwave radio relay from the Tirana exchange to Italy and Greece (2011).

=== Internet ===
Internet penetration has reached 54.7% of the population in 2012 and 60% in 2014, although this may exclude some rural areas.

Internet broadband services were initiated in 2005, but growth has been slow. Internet cafes are popular in Tirana and have started to spread outside the capital. Rural areas are provided free public broadband access though the Eutelsat satellite, with access points at post offices, schools, and local government offices.

Online media and blogs offer an independent and alternative information from mainstream media, but they reach a smaller audience and often lack resources.

== Media ownership ==
=== Transparency of media ownership ===
Transparency of media ownership refers to the public availability of accurate, comprehensive and up-to-date information about media ownership structures. A legal regime guaranteeing transparency of media ownership makes possible for the public as well as for media authorities to find out who effectively owns, controls and influences the media as well as media influence on political parties or state bodies.

The media landscape in Albania is rich, but transparency of ownership is quite low. Albania is characterized by lack of transparency on media market, hidden ownership and non-transparent trading in media shares, all features that - along with the web of clientelistic relations - have been exploited by political parties and businessman to influence the agenda of the media. Also, the behaviour of media owners, who often are linked to businesses in field other than the media one, lead to various form of media instrumentalisation which hinders media integrity.

Systematic, public and reliable data on media outlets’ economic and financial situation as well as their functioning are missing.

Media laws do not contain any specific provisions on transparency of ownership of the print and online media. However, all media outlets, like any other company in the country, are obliged to register to the National Registration Centre and declare the name of their shareholders, therefore ownership data are available for most of the media outlets, including the print ones. In addition, thanks to the digitisation of the registry and the establishment of the National Registration Centre, the transparency of official ownership data has increased.

Data for electronic media cannot be found in the register of the National Registration Centre as this kind of media outlets are not obliged to register. However, online media must report their ownership data, including all changes in the ownership structure to the National Council of Radio Television (NCRT). The register held by the NCRT, which contains also information on media licenses, is not available online but upon request.

As for broadcast media, they have to register also to the regulator, the Audiovisual Media Authority. The Authority is not obliged to publish online the data collected that, however, can be accessed upon on official request for information. Generally, if the most important ownership data for all media sectors, except for online media, can be found in the National Centre of Registration, some doubts arise on whether the declared data on owners are in fact genuine data on actual owners and the risk of hidden ownership speculation have been detected.

Another transparency problem is related to identify media’s source of funding. This is indeed one of the “unresolved issue” of the Albanian media system and a topic of constant debate in a country with high levels of informal economy. Indeed, the question of how is possible that such a great number of media operate in a small market like the Albanian one is still unanswered. In this sense, the large number of media outlets, in particular newspapers and televisions, operating in Albania is financed through parallel business on which there is a lack of transparency.

When granting licences to broadcast media, the regulator asks for proofs that the outlet holds a certain level of capital, but it does not check the origin of such capital. Also, the annual balances submitted to the tax offices are treated as confidential data, while, data on balances of the broadcast media are submitted to the regulator on a non-compulsory basis, so only a small percentage do it. For instance, in 2012 only 25% of broadcast operators submitted their balances to the regulators. Overall, the data provided to the National Council in recent years do not create a comprehensive picture of media funding. In addition, reported data are not entirely reliable Furthermore, the regulator is not obliged to publish this data, but rather present to the public aggregate data on the media market.

Another reason for concern is parallel businesses of the media owners, a phenomenon occurring when some businesses have their main investments in the media sector, but other investments in other fields, potentially making the media vulnerable towards other economic and political interests. In particular, when other interests are involved, the media are used as tools for making pressure for the protection and the development of such interests. Such a media landscape leaves room for letting that its owners’ interests, rather than the public ones, that set the media agenda and its priorities.

=== Concentration of media ownership ===
Albania media environment is characterised by lack of transparency, poor regulations and monitoring of unlawful concentration, hidden ownership patterns and lack of transparency in the trading of media shares. All these factors have contributed to a growing media's dependence on political parties, their agendas as well as on clientelistic relations.

After more than 20 years of market liberalization, there is no public reliable data on the Albanian media sector. The large number of existing media outlets does translate into media pluralism. The media landscape is reach in terms of number of media outlets, but the transparency of its dynamics and ownership is low.

The lack of accurate, reliable and updated data on the Albanian media system made it difficult to accurately assess the situation of the media market in terms of ownership, profit and audience shares. Despite the lack of data, the Albanian media system clearly shows a "visible trend of consolidation of ownership, although not to the point of creating a major problem". For instance, the sale of outlets by Edisud Group was widely considered in the media community as evidence of concentration among pro-government media. In fact, traditionally the media outlets belonging to the Edisud Group were considered close to the opposition. One of the first consequences of this acquisition was the end of the contract with Anila Basha, director of a newspaper that had in several occasions openly supported the leader of the opposition.

Consolidation has involved same editorial groups establishing print, electronic and in some cases online media. This is the case of almost all main media groups and owners in the country. For instance, Top Media owns shares in companies operating in the radio, TV, multiplex, and print sectors as well as in the publishing industry. The same applies to Koço Kokëdhima, Irfan Hysenbelliu, Aleksandër Frangaj, and other media groups. This situation is made possible also by the lack of detailed regulations on preventing ownership concentration in the sector of print media.

Cross-ownership regulation is laid out in the Law on Audiovisual Media, but its scope includes only radio and TV, while the print sector is not covered, thus no limits on print media ownership are set forth.

Furthermore, there are some concerns that the existing legal provisions on broadcast media are not fully respected and media owners find ways to circumvent them.

In Albania, the consolidation of ownership has been the result of the same editorial group establishing different media outlets in different sectors. Mergers and acquisitions have happened less frequently.

In addition, it is quite common to observe a pattern in the ownership schemes of media companies, namely the rotation of the same group of family, relatives, or trusted persons through the positions of general administrator, board members, or shareholders. This pattern also shows the allegedly fictive function of supervisory boards. Also, some media owners create a range of different companies, or close one company and re-establish it with a different name to hide the ownership patterns and the names behind it.

Also, since 2010, Albanian media market has been experiencing a significant presence of major foreign media investors, including the Italian Edisud Group, the German WAZ-Mediengruppe, etc. buying local media. Neither the presence of big international media corporations, nor the local media owners have raised a problem in terms of media ownership concentration, despite the existence of a trend in this direction. However, the problem of media ownership concentration can be observed when it comes to cross-ownership of different media platform, and existing laws do not address such cases.

In terms of pluralism of content and editorial policies, the Albanian media market offers a variety of alternative views and opinions. However, the possibility that media owners can be involved in various business enterprises in sectors other than the media one, as well as their involvement in public tenders, is a concerning issue since economic cross interests can threaten media independence and integrity. Indeed, in the Albanian media market, media outlets cannot survive if they are not supported by other lucrative business activities carried out by media owners.

According to the Albanian media expert Remi Lani, in Albania it is possible to identify who are the nominal media owners, but it is impossible to "know who owns them". According to the South East Europe Media Observatory, "the interaction among the media, politics and other business of media owners is a constant source of concern for media content and media independence" in Albania.
