= Big Brother Albania season 1 =

Season of an Albanian television series

Big Brother Albania
- Season 1
- Presented by: Arbana Osmani
- No. of days: 100
- No. of housemates: 18
- Winner: Arbër Çepani
- Runner-up: Olsi

Release
- Original network: Top Channel
- Original release: 23 February – 31 May 2008

Season chronology
- Next → Season 2

Big Brother Albania 1 was the debut season of the Albanian series of the worldwide franchise of Big Brother. It launched on Saturday, 23 February 2008, with fourteen Housemates entering the House with Romina being the first contestant to enter. The show ran for 100 days and the winner was Arbër Çepani. He received a €50,000 prize.

The show aired on two cable channels 24 hours a day on the DigitAlb cable network, as well as in two additional channels on DigitAlb Mobile. Daily reviews were shown Monday to Saturday on Top Channel at 17:55 CET. The eviction show aired Saturdays at 21:00 CET, while a weekly review closed off the week at 17:55 CET on Sunday.

The main host was Arbana Osmani, while Eno Popi received the contestants in and out of the house and conducted interviews with their families. A panel of opinionists was present on the Saturday night show. Mevlan Shanaj, a film director, and Armand Peza, a screenwriter, had permanent positions in this panel, while different singers, psychologists and relevant art figures were invited every week to give their insight. One of the most notable guests was singer Jonida Maliqi who became known for her tough debates with the evicted contestants.

A reunion show called Brenda Big Brother (Inside Big Brother) was held the week following the finale. The housemates received a series of prizes ranging from work offers abroad to vacation packages and other prizes. Juna, an aspiring singer, received a record deal for one song and a video clip from an Albanian label company. Jonida, on the other hand, earned herself a gig as an anchor at Top Albania Radio.

== Contestants ==
Housemates	Age	Entered	Exited	Status
Arbër	21	Day 1	Day 100	Winner
Olsi	33	Day 1	Day 100	Runner-Up
Astrit	35	Day 1	Day 100	Third Place
Najada	22	Day 1	Day 100	Fourth Place
Pol	21	Day 1	Day 100	Fifth Place
Jonida	25	Day 65	Day 94	Evicted
Dorina	22	Day 65	Day 85	Evicted
Besarta	20	Day 1	Day 78	Evicted
Romina	21	Day 1	Day 78	Evicted
Shkëlqim	38	Day 1	Day 71	Evicted
Julinda	23	Day 1	Day 64	Evicted
Ilda	22	Day 30	Day 54	Ejected
Mardiola	25	Day 30	Day 54	Walked
Ina	24	Day 1	Day 50	Evicted
Ervis	23	Day 1	Day 43	Evicted
Leonard	27	Day 1	Day 36	Evicted
Juna	20	Day 1	Day 29	Evicted
Ingrid	29	Day 1	Day 15	Evicted

== Summary ==
A total of 14 housemates entered as original members, while 4 others were introduced later in the game. The originals would receive the full prize if they were victorious, while the newcomers would only receive a proportional amount based on the days they spent inside the house if they were to win at the end. However, an original housemate won the show, therefore winning the full prize.

Each member cast two nominations every Saturday along with two valid reasons for each nomination. Valid reasons were mandatory. Three or more players faced the public vote. The public then had one week to vote off the person that they thought should be evicted. Five contestants made their way to the final where the public voted 35% for original housemate Arbër Çepani to win the grand prize.

The normal eviction procedure was dramatically interrupted on three occasions. The ammunition explosions in the village of Gërdec rocked the house of Big Brother which was situated 500 meters away from the scene, forcing the network to evacuate the housemates in a secluded hotel room and cancelling the normal Saturday show. The second interruption was due to the violent fight that exploded between the two newcomers Ilda and Mardiola. Mardiola walked off the show while Ilda was ejected by the Big Brother staff. The Saturday night eviction was canceled and the SMS money spent by the public was donated to charity. The third and final delay happened the last week of the show when Dritan Hoxha, president of Top Channel, died in a car accident. The network postponed the Saturday show, therefore changing the projected length of Big Brother Albania from 99 to 100 days.

The tenth round of evictions was also unusual, since the housemates were instructed to cast two secret nominations without a reason, and the three contestants with the most nominations would be up for a speedy eviction by the public at home. In 20 minutes of SMS voting, the public decided to vote off Besarta with 41% of the vote.

== Highlights ==
=== Days 1–15 ===
14 original housemates entered a spacious home in one of the wealthy villages of suburban Tirana after being secluded in hotel rooms without any contact with the outside world. The first verbal spars started between Romina and Shkëlqim as the opening show was still airing. An obvious struggle for "leader" status was taking place between the two, however, this conflict remained dormant for several weeks as the attention quickly shifted to Juna and her heated debacles with many of the housemates. The house became split after the first real fight erupted between Juna and Romina over what Romina considered "irrational usage" of the food supply. Juna told her to "go get checked", words which fueled an ongoing rivalry between the two girls. Juna had another argument with Shkëlqim over his loud singing which she disliked, as well as with Astrit due to her irritation with some of his "rural" behavior.

Despite Juna's many animosities, the housemates were more ticked off at her friend Ingrid due to her overly sensitive nature. She took many of the things that the other housemates would tell her very personal, often responding rudely or by running to her room and crying. Shkëlqim dubbed her as "mentally sick" in a private conversation with some of the roommates.

The first week's activity was for all the housemates to split into two groups and make two paintings. They decided to paint the things that matter most to them in their lives. The paintings were put up for auction during the remainder of the season and were ultimately purchased for 1400 euros, money that went to the Red Cross.

They passed the first week's challenge, but failed the second one, therefore cutting their budget in half. Ingrid was evicted with 50% of the vote. Most of the contestants were happy, except for Juna and Julinda who were closer to her. Meanwhile, Olsi was given a symbolic punishment by "Big Brother" for not helping in the kitchen and spending too much time with the girls. He was ordered to peel two sacks of potatoes and choose one of the other contestants to help him out. His choice was Juna. Unbeknown to him, his real-life girlfriend Lusika had been watching the show very closely for the past two weeks and had come to the studio to get an explanation for his behaviour. The host did not inform Olsi about Lusi's presence in the studio, however, she asked him to explain what he feels for his girlfriend and for Juna and Najada, another housemate he was close to. Olsi said that he feels relaxed with them, however "he will always love" his girlfriend. Lusi, on the other hand, admitted to the host that if he did anything with them, she would dump him.

=== Days 15–29 ===
Olsi started getting much closer to Najada, however, he could not hide away his attraction to Juna either. Although she rejected him at first, they began to bond as the weeks progressed, a move that bothered Najada. The two girls had a negative attitude toward each other but managed to keep a distance. Privately, Najada complained about Juna's loud fits with all the housemates, while Juna complained about Najada showering four times a day, arguing that the hot water gets wasted and blaming it on the fact that "Najada does not sleep alone", an obvious swipe at her proximity with Olsi and the other guys. Romina and Najada became united against Juna, finding themselves in alignment with Ervis and Shkëlqim who considered her a "spoiled brat" and wanted her out.

Najada could not wait for Saturday to come, certain that a nominated Juna would be evicted by the public. However, on Saturday, 15 March, an extremely powerful ammunition dump blast took place in the village of Gërdec, 500 meters away from the Big Brother house. The housemates were shell-shocked and terrified due to the high pressure and noise that rocked the home, forcing the network to evacuate everyone over security concerns and postpone the show for one week. The contestants were sent to a secluded hotel room and returned after 24 hours. They immediately held a session to donate blood for the victims of the tragedy.

This unlikely time-out warmed up the relationships with former rivals. Romina and Juna held a little heart-to-heart, although differences remained. Meanwhile, the Gërdec tragedy made Julinda very emotional as she thought back at her family, who did not approve of her participation in a reality show. Ina and Pol warmed up considerably towards each other although no one was ready to commit to anything serious. Ervis, on the other hand, created a strong friendship with the two of them, becoming the strategic "trio" of the house. One night he decides to tell some of his roommates about having worked as a gigolo in the past, which he later dismissed as a joke. This joke, however, did not go well with the public at home.

Juna could not keep away from another fight, this time involving Astrit. The assigned weekly activity consisted of the housemates creating a theatrical play, with which they decided to depict the differences between rural and city people. Juna decides to dress as a "villager", but Astrit, who is a farmer himself, considered it a deep insult, claiming that gypsies dressed that way, not villagers. Shkëlqim tried to fuel the disagreement even further, causing Astrit to walk away angrily as Juna laughed it off.

The Saturday night eviction ceremony began badly as the contestants lost half their budget due to their inability to pass that week's challenge. However, the biggest drama unfolded as an unsuspecting Juna gets evicted with 59% of the vote. She leaves the house in tears after a final meeting with Olsi. The troubles for Juna had only just begun as she still had to face the panel of opinionists. In a showdown with famous Albanian singer Jonida Maliqi, Juna is heavily questioned about her relationship with Olsi, especially about the ring that she carried on her finger. She said that it was a gift from Olsi and she was not going to take it off, even if her boyfriend at home asked her to. She later broke up with her boyfriend.

Later that night, Ina and Pol are treated to an exotic private date and Julinda is ordered to serve them because of her poor performance in the weekly challenge. On the other side, Olsi gets drunk and the network later revealed tapes of him and Najada engaging in a series of sexual movements under the covers. It was interpreted as sexual activity for the remainder of the season by the public and his girlfriend, however, Olsi denied it during the finale.

=== Days 29–36 ===
Olsi's obsession with Juna grows bigger in the wake of the eviction eve. He tells Najada that he wants to sleep in Juna's bed because of her fresh smell still being there. She joking response that she will "cut his face-up". Later, Romina finds him wrapped around a pillow on Juna's bed in a very distressed mood. Astrit is ticked off at the other housemates as they continue to make jokes about how villagers cannot integrate with city life. He tells them to stop joking in his presence. The weekly activity assigned by Big Brother is to paint the walls of the hallway. Olsi decides to paint a portrait of Juna, angering Najada even further. In a private talk with Julinda and Romina she confessed that when she saw Olsi for the first time, she thought he was gay.

Eviction night begins by the housemates winning the weekly challenge, a quiz on Albania's cities and cultures. Later that night, Leonard is evicted, although there wasn't a major upset in the house as he had become very withdrawn.

Then, host Arbana Osmani announces to the public that someone had come to meet Olsi in the storage room. It was Olsi's girlfriend, Lusi, who had decided to pull the plug on their relationship. The two were separated by a glass wall as the showdown took place. Lusi told him that she could not forgive him for giving Juna the ring as well as the activity under the covers with Najada.

A final surprise awaited the housemates, as two new girls were introduced in the game, Mardiola and Ilda.

=== Days 36–43 ===
Shkëlqim and Ervis are enthusiastic with the way the evictions are going, confident that the public backs them up with their recommendations so far. However, Ervis finds himself in a hot spot after a very attractive Ilda uses him to infiltrate inside the friendship "trio" he had with Ina and Pol. She is very attracted to Pol and with little effort she can catch his attention, leaving Ina angry and in tears. Shkëlqim has focused his efforts on Romina and her strong character. After Juna's departure, the fight for leader status between the two resumed, often forcing Shkëlqim to offend Romina based on her weight and her rebellious nature, claiming that "no family would want to have her". Romina was not the only thorn in the plans he had to deal with since an explosive and impulsive Mardiola was getting overly irritated by his desire to moderate everybody's behaviour. Romina now finds a new ally in Mardiola as her fight to evict the next "big fish" continues.

April Fool's Day comes knocking, and Big Brother has a funny warning for all the housemates. They are told that they have breached the regulations of the show, starting from the foul language used, causing excessive censoring for the editing crew, as well as the poor maintenance of their rooms. Julinda and Pol, two of the most positive members of the house, are ordered to leave the show. The other contestants burst in tears, only to find out that it was all a joke, but a warning at the same time.

Saturday night, the housemates fail the challenge. A restricted budget has been causing tensions for some weeks now. Later, Mardiola's birthday is celebrated but the fun stops when a very uneasy Ervis is evicted with 48% of the vote. Shkëlqim, Ina and Pol realise that Romina has snatched away the public's support. Meanwhile, Ervis blames his eviction on the public and even appears on the nightly news to clear his record from the "gigolo joke".

The week closes off with Ilda and Astrit treated to an exotic massage from two Thai masseuses.

=== Days 43–50 ===
Trouble starts brewing as Ilda and Julinda fool around in the kitchen with some fake lesbian hugging and kissing, enabling Mardiola to spread a rumor that Ilda is a lesbian. Competition between the two newcomer girls has been tense. However, Ilda denied being a lesbian. The lesbian rumor was only the tip of the iceberg, since Mardiola also admitted to spreading another rumor, claiming that Ilda had appeared in a Bluetooth cell phone tape circulating all over Albania, engaging in sexual activity with five men. The rumor was false but it only aggravated the relationship between the two girls. Ina cried in her bed for most of the week, as Pol and Ilda were enjoying each other's company. Tensions rose as Ilda claimed that Ina has been abusing her clothes in the closets and blamed it on her jealousy. Arbër found himself closer to Julinda and Besarta, however, he started to challenge their intelligence by asking questions about the profession of the girls, which they couldn't answer.

A temporary boost of morale comes on Saturday as they win the karaoke challenge and a bigger budget. Big Brother also gives a canine friend to the remaining contestants called "Bigu". However, the biggest victory was reserved for Ilda as her rival Ina is evicted with 46% of the vote. Ilda said that her eviction was well deserved and called her fake. Back in the studio, Ina jokingly asked if she could break the big screen showing Ilda still inside the house.

After the show, Julinda tells Mardiola that she nominated her. Mardiola replies that Julinda likes to "suck up" to save herself from the nomination. Julinda calls her short and criticises her for being married too early, causing Mardiola to rush towards her. The other housemates stopped them from beating each other, however, Mardiola said she wanted to leave. They were able to convince her to stay. Shkëlqim and Julinda, two former foes due to Julinda's affection for Juna and Ingrid, have now bonded over two common enemies, Mardiola and Romina.

=== Days 50–57 ===
The week kicks off as Romina decides to pull a prank on Olsi, letting him know that she is supposedly in love with him. Olsi becomes very confused, while Mardiola thinks that Romina does feel something for him but is hiding behind a joke. Romina, however, sticks with the prank excuse.

Arbër decides to cook fish for the other housemates, in what turned out to be the wildest lunch they had in the Big Brother house. As they awaited the fish to be served, Mardiola and Ilda, who were facing each other, get in a verbal fight over Mardiola eating the salad from the bowl instead of taking it in her own plate. The argument escalates as Mardiola refuses to do so, claiming it tastes better from the "common bowl". Ilda is disgusted but Mardiola reiterates by telling Ilda not to let the wine get over her head too quickly. The conversation degenerates as Ilda bullies Mardiola over her 162 cm height; however, the conflict erupts when Ilda tells Mardiola that she's not giving a good example to her daughter by walking around in underwear and lying in bed with other men. Mardiola throws her glass of water on Ilda's plate and then empties the bowl of salad on her head. Ilda smashes her glass of wine on Mardiola's back, but Mardiola responds by throwing the fish plate at Ilda, barely missing her. All of the housemates separate and hold them back. After this Jerry Springer Show scenario, Mardiola decides to walk off the show, while Ilda remains inside. Four hours later, Ilda is given the news that the staff has decided to expel her. The eviction is canceled and the SMS voting money is donated to charity. On the Saturday night show, the girls shake hands with each other and apologize to the public and housemates for this incident. The girls were spotted singing together in a karaoke bar that same week.

The Saturday show shakes things up by allowing Juna to enter for 15 minutes in the house. A surprised and happy Olsi receives her, while Najada is not impressed. Juna thanks Olsi for his rendition of her on the wall, and asks for Astrit to greet her out of the house. The two dance their way to the door as Juna's song "Away" plays on the background.

=== Days 57–64 ===
Just when Astrit thought his troubles with his rural background ended with Juna, Shkëlqim begins to crack new jokes about Astrit's facial features. The housemates considered it an immature gesture and concluded that Shkëlqim enjoys provoking new conflicts. Meanwhile, Olsi and Najada formalise their new relationship with a romantic date which Olsi cooked for and prepared. Julinda engaged in a heated debate with Olsi over her sloppiness in the kitchen. Olsi wanted her to clean up after herself since she uses it the most but Julinda defended herself by saying that everyone should clean equally.

On eviction night, Big Brother decides to let Shkëlqim meet his two children for a few minutes. However, his new ally Julinda is evicted, bringing his fight against Romina at a crucial turning point. Romina had survived a high number of nominations throughout these weeks and had made it her goal to kick Shkëlqim out before she is evicted. After all of his allies took the fall, it was now time for one of them to go.

Finally, Big Brother decides to spice things up even further by sending in two new girls to join the contest, Jonida and Dorina.

=== Days 64–71 ===
Shkëlqim and Romina engaged in a heated debate, both being self-conscious that one of them would take the fall on Saturday's eviction. The other nominee was Olsi, but he was considered too unlikely to leave. Romina accuses Shkëlqim of gossiping and playing unfairly while he simply brushed her off.

Romina won her fight with Shkëlqim on the Saturday show as Shkëlqim was evicted with 54% of the vote. Shkëlqim chose Astrit to greet him out to the door, telling him that despite the disagreements he really valued him, leaving Astrit in an emotional state.

Afterwards, Pol is surprised by Ina in the storage room. They cannot stop hugging and kissing, expressing a desire to continue their relationship outside. In the studio, Ilda said that her relationship with Pol was innocent and she is happy for the two of them.

=== Days 71–78 ===
With Shkëlqim out of the picture, Olsi thinks ahead at the next eviction with his two main targets being Romina and Dorina. Dorina has been irritating the housemates for the past week with her perfectionist attitude which Olsi and Najada were more than ready to exploit. She has also been telling the housemates that she would like to try out many sexual experiences like orgies, men from different racial backgrounds and even women. Najada and Jonida laughed it off, however, an overly conservative Astrit considered it a decadence of youth and dismissed her as not normal. Olsi shows his disappointment with Romina and points out her flip-flopping personality, mentioning many episodes when she had acted contrary to what she had anticipated.

Saturday night shocks Romina as she receives the news of her eviction. It was one of the lowest percentages to evict, only 33%, confirming her strength with the public at home. However, a second eviction is ordered by Big Brother; this time around it would be by secret ballot and the public would have less than half an hour to vote off one of the three nominees. Besarta is evicted with 41% of the vote. Najada had been arguing for weeks that Besarta only made it this far thanks to her support from the dedicated Kosovo voters and believed she would go to the final, however, this surprise eviction changed the course of events. "Bigu", the small dog that Big Brother had introduced a few weeks ago, was also taken away from the home so that it would not become too attached with any housemate in particular.

=== Days 78–85 ===
Following Romina's and Besarta's evictions, Dorina finds herself alienated by the other housemates. Jonida and Arbër have been heating up their conversations in what was perceived by the housemates as flirting.

The eviction show was especially tense for Olsi and Najada, as Najada was up for eviction along with Dorina. Olsi was especially nervous as the fate of his love story with Najada hung on the balance, however, the public decided to evict Dorina with 43% of the vote.

Later in the show, Arbër receives news that his girlfriend was very upset by his behavior in the show and would only talk to him once he left the house. Arbër was surprised by this development and assured her that she was the most important person in his life, promising to clear things up.

=== Days 85–94 ===
Arbër grows worried at the news he received about his girlfriend, while the other housemates jokingly push him to forget about her and make Jonida his new girlfriend. Jonida for her part was entertaining the idea by challenging Arbër and telling him that if she wanted to, she could get a kiss from him. He tells her that is not possible, but Jonida managed to get a friendly kiss on the cheek. However, Saturday morning the host enters the house in black clothes to let the housemates know that the normal show had been canceled because the president of the network, Dritan Hoxha, had been killed in a car accident. The housemates were speechless and expressed their condolences to his family.

The eviction show was moved on Monday with a much more subdued mood. Jonida was evicted with 74% of the vote. The housemates were informed that they were the finalists of Big Brother Albania. Meanwhile, the Saturday show was moved to Sunday, to complete the mourning week for the network.

=== Days 94–100 ===
Najada prides herself for being the last female in the finale while she suspects that Arbër might be a strong contender for the big prize. The housemates are mostly calm in this final week and anxious for everything to end.

The final begins by the housemates watching a live feed of the studio and the people waiting for them outside. Pol and Najada are evicted first but before they leave the house, Big Brother decides to surprise them both. Ina awaits Pol on an air balloon hanging over the yard of the home, throwing rose petals at him. Najada meets her two sisters in the confession room. There is one last surprise for her as she is sent back to the studio by chariot, just like she had wanted. Ranking third was Astrit who becomes part of a funny debate in the studio, teasing the evicted contestants that even a villager ranked higher than them. Later that night, Olsi gets a visit by his father in the storage room which had been transformed to match his own living room. On the other hand, Arbër is surprised with a performance by his favorite Albanian folk group as well as his little niece coming to greet him. Soon after, the voting is closed and Arbër is declared the winner of the first season of Big Brother Albania.

=== Reunion show ===
The 18 housemates met one last time in a reunion show which led to many debates as well as prizes. Juna and Najada said that they would not want to be friends outside the house, with Juna being skeptical of Najada's and Olsi's relationship in the future. Mardiola blamed Shkëlqim and Julinda for fueling her fight with Ilda, while Romina expressed her disappointment at the housemates, especially at Olsi, for a joke they made her by hiding away her glasses. Besarta, Romina and Najada engaged in a debate over Besarta's authenticity. Najada continued to claim that Besarta advanced in the game thanks to biased voting, while Besarta rejected the claims and told the girls that everyone has something different to offer. Arbër, on the other hand, declared his commitment to donate all the prize money to a public awareness campaign about the environment as well as providing more opportunities for rural children.

== Nominations table ==
	Week 2	Week 3	Week 4	Week 5	Week 6	Week 7	Week 8	Week 9	Week 10		Week 11	Week 12	Week 13 Final	
	Week 2	Week 3	Week 4	Week 5	Week 6	Week 7	Week 8	Week 9	Day 71	Day 78	Week 11	Week 12	Week 13 Final	
Arbër	Ervis, Romina	Romina, Juna	Romina, Ervis	Romina, Ervis	Romina, Ina	Olsi, Shkëlqim	Olsi, Shkëlqim	Shkëlqim, Olsi	Dorina, Jonida	Dorina, ?	Jonida, Dorina	Olsi, Pol	Winner (Day 100)	
Olsi	Ervis, Ingrid	Leonard, Ervis	Astrit, Ina	Romina, Besarta	Arbër, Shkëlqim	Mardiola, Julinda	Besarta, Julinda	Pol, Shkëlqim	Besarta, Dorina	Dorina, ?	Dorina, Pol	Jonida, Astrit	Runner-Up (Day 100)	
Astrit	Arbër, Ingrid	Arbër, Julinda	Romina, Ina	Ina, Ervis	Ina, Pol	Ilda, Mardiola	Romina, Pol	Shkëlqim, Pol	Jonida, Dorina	Dorina, ?	Jonida, Dorina	Jonida, Arbër	Third Place (Day 100)	
Najada	Ina, Juna	Juna, Pol	Leonard, Besarta	Besarta, Pol	Besarta, Pol	Julinda, Besarta	Julinda, Besarta	Besarta, Shkëlqim	Dorina, Besarta	Dorina, ?	Dorina, Pol	Jonida, Pol	Fourth Place (Day 100)	
Pol	Leonard, Najada	Leonard, Romina	Leonard, Romina	Romina, Astrit	Romina, Astrit	Mardiola, Olsi	Romina, Olsi	Romina, Astrit	Romina, Najada	Dorina, ?	Dorina, Najada	Jonida, Astrit	Fifth Place (Day 100)	
Jonida	Not in house							Exempt	Dorina, Romina	Dorina, ?	Dorina, Arbër	Pol, Olsi	Evicted (Day 94)	
Dorina	Not in house							Exempt	Najada, Olsi	Olsi, Besarta	Olsi, Najada	Evicted (Day 85)		
Besarta	Astrit, Najada	Astrit, Ina	Astrit, Ina	Romina, Najada	Romina, Najada	Romina, Najada	Romina, Olsi	Romina, Olsi	Olsi, Dorina	Dorina, ?	Evicted (Day 78)			
Romina	Ingrid, Juna	Leonard, Arbër	Arbër, Besarta	Ina, Besarta	Arbër, Julinda	Julinda, Besarta	Julinda, Besarta	Besarta, Shkëlqim	Pol, Besarta	Evicted (Day 78)				
Shkëlqim	Ingrid, Leonard	Leonard, Juna	Leonard, Romina	Romina, Arbër	Romina, Arbër	Mardiola, Olsi	Romina, Olsi	Olsi, Romina	Evicted (Day 71)					
Julinda	Romina, Shkëlqim	Romina, Shkëlqim	Romina, Astrit	Romina, Najada	Romina, Najada	Mardiola, Romina	Romina, Najada	Evicted (Day 64)						
Ilda	Not in house			Exempt	Exempt	Mardiola, Olsi	Ejected (Day 54)							
Mardiola	Not in house			Exempt	Exempt	Julinda, Besarta	Walked (Day 54)							
Ina	Ingrid, Najada	Leonard, Astrit	Romina, Leonard	Romina, Astrit	Romina, Astrit	Evicted (Day 50)								
Ervis	Arbër, Ingrid	Arbër, Juna	Romina, Astrit	Romina, Besarta	Evicted (Day 43)									
Leonard	Pol, Shkëlqim	Ina, Shkëlqim	Ina, Pol	Evicted (Day 36)										
Juna	Romina, Shkëlqim	Shkëlqim, Romina	Evicted (Day 29)											
Ingrid	Romina, Shkëlqim	Evicted (Day 15)												
Nominated For Eviction	Ingrid, Romina, Shkëlqim	Juna, Leonard, Romina	Astrit, Ina, Leonard, Romina	Astrit, Besarta, Ervis, Ina, Najada, Romina	Arbër, Astrit, Ina, Najada, Pol, Romina	Julinda, Mardiola, Olsi	Besarta, Julinda, Olsi, Romina	Olsi, Romina, Shkëlqim	Besarta, Dorina, Jonida, Najada, Olsi, Romina	Besarta, Dorina, Jonida	Dorina, Jonida, Najada, Pol	Jonida, Pol	Arbër, Astrit, Najada, Olsi, Pol	
Ejected	none					Ilda	none							
Walked	none					Mardiola	none							
Evicted	Ingrid; 50% to evict	Juna; 59% to evict	Leonard; 32% to evict	Ervis; 48% to evict	Ina; 46% to evict	Eviction; Cancelled	Julinda; 45% to evict	Shkëlqim; 54% to evict	Romina; 33% to evict	Besarta; 41% to evict	Dorina; 43% to evict	Jonida; 74% to evict	Pol; Fewest votes (out of 5)	Najada; Fewest votes (out of 4)
Evicted	Ingrid; 50% to evict	Juna; 59% to evict	Leonard; 32% to evict	Ervis; 48% to evict	Ina; 46% to evict	Eviction; Cancelled	Julinda; 45% to evict	Shkëlqim; 54% to evict	Romina; 33% to evict	Besarta; 41% to evict	Dorina; 43% to evict	Jonida; 74% to evict	Astrit; Fewest votes (out of 3)	Olsi; Fewest votes (out of 2)
Evicted	Ingrid; 50% to evict	Juna; 59% to evict	Leonard; 32% to evict	Ervis; 48% to evict	Ina; 46% to evict	Eviction; Cancelled	Julinda; 45% to evict	Shkëlqim; 54% to evict	Romina; 33% to evict	Besarta; 41% to evict	Dorina; 43% to evict	Jonida; 74% to evict	Arbër; 35% to win	

Nominations - Nominimet
