= IMA Awards =

Albanian Music Award

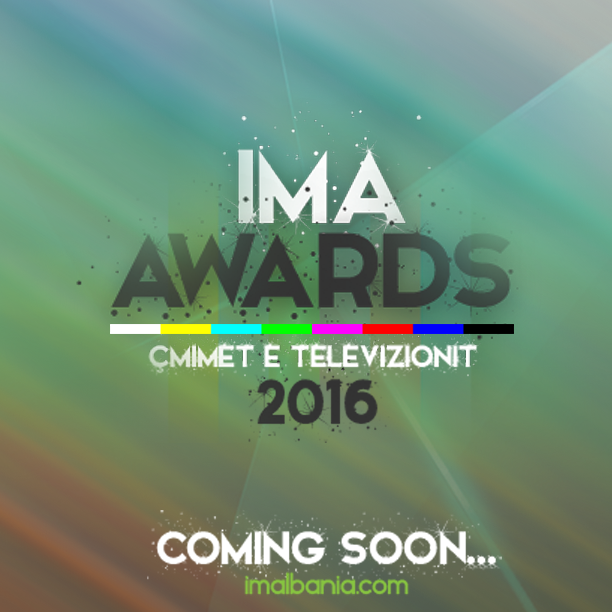
- Location: Online
- Country: Albania and Kosovo
- First award: 2011
- Website: www.imalbania.com/cmimetetelevizionit/

The InfoMedia Albania Awards (often shortened to IMA Awards) is an Albanian and Kosovo television awards ceremony, initiated in 2011 by the television news website InfoMedia Albania (IMA). The InfoMedia Albania Awards are the most prominent ceremony for which the results are voted on by the general public.

The first ceremony was held in 2011 through a vote on IMA's Facebook page. Voting continued through its official website from 2014 onwards.

== Voting process ==
The public vote is an online poll that takes place on the InfoMedia Albania website; viewers can select from a longlist of nominees, with the process verified by an independent adjudicator. The results are widely reported in the Albanian and Kosovo media with worldwide media coverage of some categories.

== Editions ==
Edition	Month of Start
1st	March 2011
2nd	March 2014
3rd	March 2015
4th	5 November - 10 December 2016
6th	1 December - 31 December 2017
7th	TBA

== Winners ==
=== 2011: 1st edition ===
Award	Winner
Best Music Channel	My Music
Best TV Male Presenter	Adi Krasta
Best TV Female Presenter	Rudina Magjistari
Best Political TV Show	Opinion (TV Klan)
Best Talk Show	Ora 5PM (Vizion Plus)
Best Telenovela	Teresa (Telemundo)
Best Albanian Singer/Group	Aurela Gaçe
Best Foreign Singer/Group	Katy Perry
Best TV Serie for Teens	Naruto (via DigitAlb)
Best TV Serie	Lost (via Top Channel)
Best Albanian Reality Show	Dancing with the Stars (Vizion Plus)
Best Film of the Year	Harry Potter
The Event of The Year	FIFA World Cup 2010
IMA Special Award	Cocktail Show

=== 2014: 2nd edition ===
Award	Winner
Show of The Year	Dancing with the Stars 4 – Vizion Plus
Best Comic Show	Apartamenti 2XL - Vizion Plus
Best Investigative Show	Fiks Fare - Top Channel
Best Afternoon Show	Vizioni i Pasdites - Vizion Plus
Best Entertainment Show	E Diell - Top Channel
Best Cultural Show	Jo Vetëm Modë - TV Klan
Best Music Show	Kënga Magjike - TV Klan
Best Youth Show	Heart Attack – Agon Channel
Best Program of the Information and Analysis	Zonë e Ndaluar - Vizion Plus
Best Morning Show	7 pa 5 – Vizion Plus
Best Political Program	Opinion – TV Klan
Best Sportive Program	Proçesi Sportiv – Top Channel
Talent Show of The Year	The Voice of Albania – Top Channel
Best Talent Show	Urbanika – A1 Report
Best Talent Show for Children	1001 Pse?! – Top Channel
Best Game / Quiz Show	Për Vete – Top Channel
Best news TV edition	News - Top Channel
Best Male News Reader	Dhimiter Gjoka – Albanian Screen
Best Female News Reader	Mira Kazhani – Vizion Plus
Male TV Person of the Year	Ermal Mamaqi
Female TV Person of the Year	Fiori Dardha – Top Channel
The Newly TV Character of the Year	Klea Huta
The Best Social Person of the Year	Ermal Mamaqi
Best Director	Ardit Gjebrea
Best Show Producer	Zefina Hasani
Best Albanian Act	Elhaida Dani
Best Generalist TV Channel	Top Channel
The Best Turkish Serie	Karadayi - Vizion Plus
Best News Channel	A1 Report
Best Music Channel	My Music - Digitalb
Best Digital Channel	TPlus - Digitalb
The Best Italian Series	Squadra Antimafia - Palermo oggi - Top Channel
The Best American Series	House - TV Klan
Best Kosovo Debate TV Show	Zona e Debatit - Klan Kosova
Best Kosovo Entertainment Show	Prive - Klan Kosova
Social Show of the Year (Special Award without voting)	Thumb – Nitro Shqip

=== 2015: 3rd edition ===
Award	The Winner
Best Generalist TV Channel	Top Channel
Best Local TV Channel	Channel One
Best News Channel	A1 Report
Best Music Channel	MAD Albania
The Best Digital Platforme	Digitalb
Best TV Male Presenter	Ledion Liço
Best TV Female Presenter	Alketa Vejsiu
The Best TV Couple	Fatma Haxhialiu and Aulona Musta
Best TV Show Author	Eraldo Rexho
Best TV News Reader	Isli Islami
The Newly TV Character	Fatma Methasani
Social Character of the Year (Special Award without voting)	Ambra Meda
The Newness TV Format	Master Chef Albania
Best Morning Show	Wake Up në Top Channel
Best Debate/Political Program	Opinion - TV Klan
Best Afternoon Show	Takimi i Pasdites - Top Channel
Best Entertainment Show	E Diell - Top Channel
Best Talent Show	The Voice of Albania
Best Event Format	Fest 53 - RTSH
Best Game / Quiz Show	100 Milionë - Top Channel
Best Comic Show	Portokalli - Top Channel
Best Investigative Show	Fiks Fare - Top Channel
Best Satire Show	Bypass Show - Vizion Plus
Best Showbizz Show	Gjithcka Shqip
Best Talk Show	Kontrata
Best New Year night show	Authochtonus - Top Channel
Best Sportive Show	Proçesi Sportiv - Top Channel
Best News Edition	Lajme - Top Channel
Best WEB Show Format	da Sara - A1 Report
Best Drama	Scandal - Vizion Plus
Best Soap/Telenovela	Biddai - TV Klan
Best Turkish Serie	Valley of the Wolves - Vizion Plus
Best TV Portal	Top Channel
Best TV App	Top Channel
