= Lori Hoxha =

Albanian media executive and television producer (born 1993)

- Born: Lorela Hoxha; 19 October 1993 (age 32); Tirana, Albania
- Education: Regent's University London
- Occupations: Media executive; television producer
- Years active: 2018–present
- Employer: Top Media Group
- Spouse: Ervis Bajraktari (m. 2024)
- Parents: Dritan Hoxha (father); Vjollca Hoxha (mother)
- Relatives: Sara Hoxha (sister); Redia Hoxha (sister); Itan Hoxha (brother)

Lori Hoxha (born 19 October 1993) is an Albanian media executive, entrepreneur and television producer.

== Early life and education ==
Hoxha was born in Tirana on 19 October 1993. She is the daughter of media entrepreneur Dritan Hoxha and Vjollca Hoxha. She has three siblings: sisters Sara and Redia, and a brother, Itan.

Her sister, Sara Hoxha, works in television production on Top Channel.

== Career ==
=== Television production ===
She has served as an executive producer on several editions of the Albanian reality series Big Brother VIP Albania, including:

- Big Brother Albania VIP 1 (2008)
- Big Brother Albania VIP 2 (2009)
- Big Brother Albania VIP 3 (2010)

She has also worked on other Top Channel programmes, including Top Music Awards.

=== Executive leadership ===
In 2022, she succeeded her mother, Vjollca Hoxha, as Chief Executive Officer of Top Media.

=== Business activities ===
Outside her work in broadcasting, Hoxha has participated in several business initiatives. She was involved in the rebranding of the coffee company Lori Caffe and later introduced the energy drink Storm. She has also collaborated with the Albanian sportswear brand COHL’S Sportswear, releasing seasonal clothing lines under the label “LH x COHL’S”.

== Personal life ==
In October 2024, Hoxha married Ervis Bajraktari, an Albanian businessman, in a private ceremony in Tirana.
