= Yjet Shqiptarë të Diasporës =

Albanian talent show competition

- Genre: Talent show
- Created by: Ledja Liku
- Screenplay by: Ledja Liku
- Directed by: Drilon Jaku; Redi Treni
- Presented by: Ilir Shaqiri; Danja Koka
- Judges: Ilir Shaqiri; Vikena Kamenica; Alban Male; Ines Memisharaj
- Country of origin: Albania
- Original language: Albanian
- No. of seasons: 1
- No. of episodes: 14

Production
- Executive producer: Ledja Liku
- Cinematography: Drini Jaku; Amarildo Rizvani; Kleudor Marra
- Editors: Silvana Babaramo; Edvina Gajo
- Camera setup: Multi-camera
- Production company: Top Channel

Original release
- Network: Top Channel
- Release: 2 February – 29 June 2025

Yjet Shqiptarë të Diasporës (Albanian: [ˈujɛt ʃcipˈtaɾə tə diaspɔˈɾəs]), also known as Yjet e Diasporës (Albanian: [ˈujɛt ɛ diaspɔˈɾəs]), is an Albanian television talent show competition that showcases young talents of Albanian origin in various fields of the arts, such as dance, singing, music, and more, living abroad, produced by Top Channel with support from the Dritan Hoxha Media Foundation and Ministry of Economy, Culture and Innovation. The show began airing on 2 February 2025 on Top Channel broadcasting every Sunday at 20:10 during prime time, with Ledja Liku as author,screenwriter and executive producer and choreographer Ilir Shaqiri as the presenter for the auditions phase. In the semi-finals and final, the presenter was Danja Koka. The show discovers young Albanian talents or those of Albanian origin living outside Albania. For the first time on Albanian screens, a project is being realized, outside the borders of Albania, to promote the values of the Albanian diaspora.

== Format ==
Yjet Shqiptarë të Diasporës is a talent show that was held in several cities in Europe, with Albanians living in the diaspora on the ages from 14 until 30 years old.

The competitors of this talent show are in the following categories:

- Dance
- Interpretation
- Performer
- Musician
- Singer
- as well as in other arts

The contestant will first apply by registering their details, and must also submit a 60-second video performing in the genre they will be applying for. The first stage of the show is not broadcast. The producers of the show audition all the artists that submitted their selves through the form on the website.

After the pre-audition phase, where the new talents of the Albanian Diaspora are selected, the public, through online voting system, chooses the semi-finalists, while the jury, composed of a panel of well-known Albanian public figures, selects the new talents that go to the final phase of the program.

| Audition city | Filming date | Ref. |
|---|---|---|
| Rome | 21 September 2024 | |
| Dortmund | 5 October 2024 | |
| Skopje | 12 October 2024 | |
| Basel | 27 October 2024 | |
| Pristina | 2 November 2024 | |
| Milan | 10 November 2024 | |

== Hosts and Judges ==
For the semi-finals and final, the hosts and judges are:

| Name | Role | Profession |
|---|---|---|
| Danja Koka | Host | Model, former Big Brother VIP season 4 housemate |
| Ilir Shaqiri | Judge | Choreographer and Dancer |
| Vikena Kamenica | Judge | Mezzo-soprano, member of the Albanian National Theatre of Opera and Ballet |
| Alban Male | Judge | Composer |
| Ines Memisharaj | Judge | Violinist |

== Auditions ==
Color key

| Artist was saved by the public's votes |
| Artist was eliminated |

| Episode | Audition city | Order | Participant | Category | Result |
|---|---|---|---|---|---|
| Episode 1 (2 February) | Rome | 1 | Giulia Muça | Dance | Eliminated |
| Episode 1 (2 February) | Rome | 2 | Alesia Hamzollari | Singer | Eliminated |
| Episode 1 (2 February) | Rome | 3 | Denzel & Zhizel Ndreka | Dance | Saved |
| Episode 1 (2 February) | Rome | 4 | Uendi Shaqiri | Singer | Saved |
| Episode 1 (2 February) | Rome | 5 | Nika Tuçi | Dance | Saved |
| Episode 1 (2 February) | Rome | 6 | Arvin Khorsandi | Performance | Saved |
| Episode 1 (2 February) | Rome | 7 | Marsel Meta | Instrumentalist | Saved |
| Episode 2 (9 February) | Rome | 1 | Sara Bishani | Singer | Saved |
| Episode 2 (9 February) | Rome | 2 | Greis Prenga | Dance | Saved |
| Episode 2 (9 February) | Rome | 3 | Kevin Kometa | Singer | Eliminated |
| Episode 2 (9 February) | Rome | 4 | Enida Nuredini | Dance | Eliminated |
| Episode 2 (9 February) | Rome | 5 | Alesio Lulaj | Singer | Eliminated |
| Episode 2 (9 February) | Rome | 6 | Giulia Vuksani | Dance | Eliminated |
| Episode 2 (9 February) | Rome | 7 | Ema Kapidani | Singer | Eliminated |
| Episode 3 (16 February) | Rome | 1 | Kimberly Beu | Dance | Saved |
| Episode 3 (16 February) | Rome | 2 | Isabela Shabi | Singer | Saved |
| Episode 3 (16 February) | Rome | 3 | Enart Bakiasi | Singer | Eliminated |
| Episode 3 (16 February) | Rome | 4 | Erika Shalla | Dance | Saved |
| Episode 3 (16 February) | Rome | 5 | Emili Mankolli | Interpretation | Eliminated |
| Episode 3 (16 February) | Rome | 6 | Alked Kuçi | Singer | Eliminated |
| Episode 3 (16 February) | Rome | 7 | Ana Qyra | Singer | Saved |
| Episode 4 (23 February) | Dortmund | 1 | Ansambli Dardanët | Albanian Dance | Eliminated |
| Episode 4 (23 February) | Dortmund | 2 | Aurora Krasniqi | Singer | Saved |
| Episode 4 (23 February) | Dortmund | 3 | Jonas Drashi | Interpretation | Eliminated |
| Episode 4 (23 February) | Dortmund | 4 | Gloria Xholi | Singer | Eliminated |
| Episode 4 (23 February) | Dortmund | 5 | Kiara Rexhepi | Singer | Eliminated |
| Episode 4 (23 February) | Dortmund | 6 | Hergys Dako | Dance | Eliminated |
| Episode 5 (2 March) | Dortmund | 1 | Herva Novaku | Singer | Saved |
| Episode 5 (2 March) | Dortmund | 2 | Benedetta Lushtaku | Dance | Saved |
| Episode 5 (2 March) | Dortmund | 3 | Lenart Mustafa | Singer | Eliminated |
| Episode 5 (2 March) | Dortmund | 4 | Ariona Hamzallari | Singer | Saved |
| Episode 5 (2 March) | Dortmund | 5 | Ejona Azemi | Singer | Eliminated |
| Episode 5 (2 March) | Dortmund | 6 | Nina Çela | Singer | Eliminated |
| Episode 6 (9 March) | Basel | 1 | Irena Kastrati | Singer | Eliminated |
| Episode 6 (9 March) | Basel | 2 | Ajoni Nelaj | Interpretation | Eliminated |
| Episode 6 (9 March) | Basel | 3 | Ajla Budini | Singer | Eliminated |
| Episode 6 (9 March) | Basel | 4 | Medaur Sadrija | Interpretation | Eliminated |
| Episode 6 (9 March) | Basel | 5 | Jonila Shahiqi | Singer | Saved |
| Episode 6 (9 March) | Basel | 6 | Albion Rexhaj | Singer | Eliminated |
| Episode 7 (16 March) | Skopje | 1 | Andi Ismaili | Dance | Saved |
| Episode 7 (16 March) | Skopje | 2 | Eneida Emini | Interpretation | Eliminated |
| Episode 7 (16 March) | Skopje | 3 | Erion Qoqaj | Singer | Eliminated |
| Episode 7 (16 March) | Skopje | 4 | Diellza Aliu | Singer | Eliminated |
| Episode 7 (16 March) | Skopje | 5 | Arblind Abdilfetai | Singer | Eliminated |
| Episode 8 (23 March) | Pristina | 1 | Klejda Bashota | Singer | Eliminated |
| Episode 8 (23 March) | Pristina | 2 | Sindi Muharremi | Singer | Eliminated |
| Episode 8 (23 March) | Pristina | 3 | Dren Krasniqi | Singer | Eliminated |
| Episode 8 (23 March) | Pristina | 4 | Dea Pasha | Singer | Saved |
| Episode 9 (30 March) | Milan | 1 | Ester Bracaj | Dance | Eliminated |
| Episode 9 (30 March) | Milan | 2 | Gisela Asllani | Singer | Eliminated |
| Episode 9 (30 March) | Milan | 3 | Sara Payman | Singer | Saved |
| Episode 9 (30 March) | Milan | 4 | Ema Kovaci | Singer | Saved |
| Episode 9 (30 March) | Milan | 5 | Valeria Vitaj | Singer | Eliminated |
| Episode 10 (6 April) | Milan | 1 | Sara Palazzo | Singer | Eliminated |
| Episode 10 (6 April) | Milan | 2 | Franceska Gerxhi | Dance | Eliminated |
| Episode 10 (6 April) | Milan | 3 | Sea Meti | Singer | Eliminated |
| Episode 10 (6 April) | Milan | 4 | Sara Cani | Dance | Saved |
| Episode 11 (13 April) | Milan | 1 | Lukrezia Tanzini | Dance | Saved |
| Episode 11 (13 April) | Milan | 2 | Ndue Lala | Flautist | Eliminated |
| Episode 11 (13 April) | Milan | 3 | Endri Shqarthi | Singer | Eliminated |
| Episode 11 (13 April) | Milan | 4 | Entela Zeneli | Singer | Eliminated |

== Semifinalists ==
Color key

| Artist advanced from auditions and is currently in semifinals |

| Participant | Category | Result |
|---|---|---|
| Nika Tuçi | Dance | Advanced to semifinals |
| Arvin Khorsandi | Interpretation | Advanced to semifinals |
| Greis Prenga | Dance | Advanced to semifinals |
| Lukrezia Tanzini | Dance | Advanced to semifinals |
| Ana Qyra | Singer | Advanced to semifinals |
| Uendi Shaqiri | Singer | Advanced to semifinals |
| Erika Shalla | Dance | Advanced to semifinals |
| Jonila Shahiqi | Singer | Advanced to semifinals |
| Sara Payman | Singer | Advanced to semifinals |
| Denzel & Zhizel Ndreka | Dance | Advanced to semifinals |
| Marsel Meta | Instrumentalist | Advanced to semifinals |
| Kimberly Beu | Dance | Advanced to semifinals |
| Isabela Shabi | Singer | Advanced to semifinals |
| Dea Pasha | Singer | Advanced to semifinals |
| Herva Novaku | Singer | Advanced to semifinals |
| Aurora Krasniqi | Singer | Advanced to semifinals |
| Benedeta Lushtaku | Dance | Advanced to semifinals |
| Ema Kovaci | Singer | Advanced to semifinals |
| Sara Cani | Dance | Advanced to semifinals |
| Andi Ismaili | Dance | Advanced to semifinals |
| Ariona Hamzallari | Singer | Advanced to semifinals |
| Sara Bishani | Singer | Advanced to semifinals |

== Finalists ==
Color key

| Finalist selected by public/jury vote |
| Finalist selected through a duel |

| Participant | Category | Method of Advancement | Result |
|---|---|---|---|
| Andi Ismaili | Dance | Public/Jury votes | Finalist |
| Sara Payman | Singer | Public/Jury votes | Finalist |
| Nika Tuçi | Dance | Public/Jury votes | Finalist |
| Isabela Shabi | Singer | Public/Jury votes | Finalist |
| Sara Bishani | Singer | Public/Jury votes | Finalist |
| Ariona Hamzallari | Singer | Public/Jury votes | Finalist |
| Benedetta Lushtaku | Dance | Public/Jury votes | Finalist |
| Erika Shalla | Dance | Duel winner (vs Kimberly Beu) | Finalist |
| Jonila Shahiqi | Singer | Duel winner (vs Herva Novaku) | Finalist |
| Kimberly Beu | Dance | Public/Jury votes | Finalist |
| Sara Cani | Dance | Public/Jury votes | Finalist |
| Herva Novaku | Singer | Duel winner (vs Jonila Shahiqi) | Finalist |

== Final Duel ==
| Duel | Winner |
|---|---|
| Andi Ismaili vs Sara Cani | Andi Ismaili |
| Kimberly Beu vs Erika Shalla | Erika Shalla |
| Jonila Shahiqi vs Herva Novaku | Herva Novaku |

== Winner ==
| Winner | Category |
|---|---|
| Herva Novaku | Singer |
