= Big Brother Albania season 9 =

Season of an Albanian television series

Big Brother Albania
- Season 9
- Hosted by: Arbana Osmani
- No. of days: 99
- No. of housemates: 18
- Winners: Danjel Dedndreaj & Fotini Derxho
- Runners-up: Fiorentina Halili & Olsi Klosi
- Companion shows: Big Brother Fans' Club; Big Bastards

Release
- Original network: Top Channel
- Original release: 18 March – 24 June 2017

Season chronology
- ← Previous; Season 8

Big Brother Albania 9, also known as Big Brother - Love Edition, was the ninth season of the Albanian television series of the worldwide franchise of Big Brother. It started on March 18, 2017, and ended on June 24, 2017, on Top Channel. The show ran for 99 days. The winner received 15,000,000 lekë (€100,000) and for the first time in the Big Brother Albania history the winner would be a couple. The winner couple was Danjel Dedndreaj & Fotini Derxho. The main host is again Arbana Osmani who returned for the eighth time, after taking the previous season off due to pregnancy.

Big Brother Fans' Club returned with the main host Albana Osmani, and Olti Curri being part of the show. The Fans' Club show featured dialogues with evicted contestants, housemates from the previous series and fans of the show. Big Bastards the new show for Big Brother Albania 9, it was airing after the Live Eviction Show.

The live eviction show was every Saturday at 21:00 CET, while every day of the week at 16:00 was a one-hour episode, that showed what happens into the house. Fans' Club was every Sunday from 13:00 to 15:00. Big Bastards was after the live eviction show for about 15 to 20 minutes.

Like all the previous seasons, two 24/7 live PPV channels, with the name Big Brother 1 and Big Brother 2, were made available on DigitAlb since the start of the show.

== Auditions ==
Auditions for Big Brother Albania 9 was taken in Tirana and Pristina.

=== Open auditions ===
Producers auditions commenced on 6 January in Tirana and ended on 30 January again in Tirana.

Audition city	Open audition date	Open audition venue
Tirana	6-7-8 January 2017	Tirana International Hotel
Tirana	30 January 2017	Pyramid of Tirana
Pristina	21–22 January 2017	Hotel "Sirius"

== Housemates ==
- On Day 1, 10 single housemates and 5 couples entered the house.
- Viewers will have three weeks to decide who will be the new couples.
- From Day 1, the 10 singles housemates were in another house and the 5 couples in another house.
- 8 couples entered the house on Day 50.
- From Week 10, Ambra and Elsamed no longer a couple. They are playing the game separately.

Housemates	Age	Birthplace/Residence	Occupation	Couple	Entered	Exited	Status
Danjel Dedndreaj	26	Tropojë	Student	Fotini	Day 1	Day 99	Winner
Fotini Derxho	23	Gjirokastër	Sales agent	Danjel	Day 1	Day 99	Winner
Fiorentina Halili	28	Tirana	Freelance	Olsi	Day 1	Day 99	Runner-up
Olsi Klosi	27	Tirana	Freelance	Fiorentina	Day 1	Day 99	Runner-up
Katerina Ago	20	Korçë	—N/a	Lupçe	Day 1	Day 99	3rd Place
Lupçe Vangjelofski	22	Pustec	—N/a	Katerina	Day 1	Day 99	3rd Place
Dona Pjetri	26	Tirana	—N/a	Musa	Day 8	Day 92	12th Evicted
Musa Zeneli	25	Vlore	—N/a	Dona	Day 8	Day 92	12th Evicted
Ambra Muji	19	Shkodra	Model	~~Elsamed~~	Day 50	Day 92	11th Evicted
Elsamed Senaj	23	Malësia	Musician	~~Ambra~~	Day 50	Day 85	10th Evicted
Donald Gordani	—N/a	—N/a	—N/a	Elisona	Day 50	Day 85	9th Evicted
Elisona Çepi	—N/a	—N/a	—N/a	Donald	Day 50	Day 85	9th Evicted
Enida Hasanaj	—N/a	—N/a	—N/a	Marjus	Day 50	Day 71	8th Evicted
Marjus Hasanaj	—N/a	—N/a	—N/a	Enida	Day 50	Day 71	8th Evicted
Adnand	29	Konispol	Technician	Gastere	Day 50	Day 64	7th Evicted
Gastere	28	Sarandë	Manager	Adnand	Day 50	Day 64	7th Evicted
Benard Marashi	21	Lezhë	Boxer	Xheni	Day 1	Day 50	6th Evicted
Xheni Mëhillaj	21	Lezhë/Italy	Administration	Benard	Day 1	Day 50	6th Evicted
Armela Hyseni	21	Tirana	Model	Damiano	Day 1	Day 50	Ejected
Damiano Agalliu	26	Berat	Manager	Armela	Day 15	Day 50	Ejected
Damiano Agalliu	26	Berat	Manager	Donjeta	Day 1	Day 11	Walked
Vivi Hasula	30	Tirana	Social Worker	Kei	Day 1	Day 43	5th Evicted
Kei Jahja	26	Tirana	DeeJay	Vivi	Day 1	Day 43	5th Evicted
Ervini Zyfi	28	Korçë/Tirana	Footballer	Sidrita	Day 1	Day 36	4th Evicted
Sidrita Sadikaj	22	Tirana	Model	Ervin	Day 1	Day 36	4th Evicted
Liridon Sejdiu	33	Pristina	Manager	None	Day 1	Day 22	3rd Evicted
Kleodiana Mecaj	21	Fier	—N/a	Egnajt	Day 8	Day 22	Ejected
Egnajt Kondakçiu	27	Berat	—N/a	Kleodiana	Day 8	Day 22	Ejected
Ejona Rapanj	23	Berat	—N/a	Adem	Day 1	Day 22	2nd Evicted
Adem Rapanj	25	Berat	—N/a	Ejona	Day 1	Day 22	2nd Evicted
Denis Pëllumbi	22	Tirana	Student	Gerta	Day 1	Day 15	1st Evicted
Gerta Shino	26	Tirana	Marketing agent	Denis	Day 1	Day 15	1st Evicted
Donjeta Sejdiu	19	Pristina	Unemployed	Damiano	Day 1	Day 11	Walked

== Bachelor House and Couple House ==
=== Summary ===
- On Day 1, the 10 single housemates were entered the Bachelor House and the 5 couples were entered the Couple House.
- On Day 8, Damiano coupled with Donjeta, Danjel coupled with Fotini and they moved to the Couples House.
- Also, Dona, Egnajt, Kleodiana & Musa entered the Big Brother House as singles, and they lived in the Bachelor House.
- On Day 11, Donjeta and Damiano walked, due to Donjeta who wanted to leave the house so Damiano left the House with her.
- On Day 15, Damiano returned by the most public votes, but he was single so he entered the Bachelor House again.
- The same day, Sidrita coupled with Ervin and they moved to the Couples House.
- On Day 22, Armela coupled with Damiano, Xheni coupled with Benard, Dona coupled with Musa and they moved to the Couples House.
- Liridon wasn't coupled with any of the girl housemates so he was evicted.
- And Kleodiana and Egnajt didn't accept to be a couple with each other, so they were ejected by Big Brother.
- From week 4 all the housemates (couples) lived together.

	Week 1	Week 2	Week 3
Armela	Bachelor House		
Benard	Bachelor House		
Damiano	Bachelor House	Couple House	Bachelor House
Danjel	Bachelor House	Couple House	
Dona	Not in House	Bachelor House	
Ervini	Bachelor House		Couple House
Fiorentina	Couple House		
Fotini	Bachelor House	Couple House	
Katerina	Couple House		
Kei	Couple House		
Lupçe	Couple House		
Musa	Not in House	Bachelor House	
Olsi	Couple House		
Sidrita	Bachelor House		Couple House
Vivi	Couple House		
Xheni	Bachelor House		
Liridon	Bachelor House		
Egnajt	Not in House	Bachelor House	
Kleodiana	Not in House	Bachelor House	
Ejona	Couple House		
Adem	Couple House		
Denis	Couple House		
Gerta	Couple House		
Donjeta	Bachelor House	Couple House	

== Nominations table ==
		Week 2	Week 3	Week 5	Week 6	Week 7	Week 9	Week 10	Week 12		Week 13		Week 14 Final	
		Week 2	Week 3	Week 5	Week 6	Week 7	Week 9	Week 10	Day 71	Day 85		Day 92	Week 14 Final	
	Danjel	No; Nominations	Fiorentina & Olsi; Kei & Vivi	Kei & Vivi	Dona & Musa; Fiorentina & Olsi	Dona & Musa; Fiorentina & Olsi	Dona & Musa; Ambra & Elsamed	Elsamed; Dona & Musa	Elsamed; Ambra	No; Nominations	Ambra; Dona & Musa	No; Nominations	Winner (Day 99)	
	Fotini	No; Nominations	Fiorentina & Olsi; Kei & Vivi	Kei & Vivi	Dona & Musa; Fiorentina & Olsi	Dona & Musa; Fiorentina & Olsi	Dona & Musa; Ambra & Elsamed	Elsamed; Dona & Musa	Elsamed; Ambra	No; Nominations	Ambra; Dona & Musa	No; Nominations	Winner (Day 99)	
	Fiorentina	Adem & Ejona; Katerina & Lupçe	Adem & Ejona; Danjel & Fotini	Nominated	Armela & Damiano; Kei & Vivi	Armela & Damiano; Katerina & Lupçe	Enida & Marjus; Ambra & Elsamed	Elsamed; Enida & Marjus	Donald & Elisona; Elsamed	No; Nominations	Ambra; Dona & Musa	No; Nominations	Runner-Up (Day 99)	
	Olsi	Adem & Ejona; Katerina & Lupçe	Adem & Ejona; Danjel & Fotini	Nominated	Armela & Damiano; Kei & Vivi	Armela & Damiano; Katerina & Lupçe	Enida & Marjus; Ambra & Elsamed	Elsamed; Enida & Marjus	Donald & Elisona; Elsamed	No; Nominations	Ambra; Dona & Musa	No; Nominations	Runner-Up (Day 99)	
	Katerina	Kei & Vivi; Adem & Ejona	Kei & Vivi; Adem & Ejona	No; Nominations	Fiorentina & Olsi; Kei & Vivi	Fiorentina & Olsi; Benard & Xheni	Adnand & Gastare; Enida & Marjus	Enida & Marjus; Danjel & Fotini	Danjel & Fotini; Ambra	No; Nominations	Danjel & Fotini; Ambra	No; Nominations	Third Place (Day 99)	
	Lupçe	Kei & Vivi; Adem & Ejona	Kei & Vivi; Adem & Ejona	No; Nominations	Fiorentina & Olsi; Kei & Vivi	Fiorentina & Olsi; Benard & Xheni	Adnand & Gastare; Enida & Marjus	Enida & Marjus; Danjel & Fotini	Danjel & Fotini; Ambra	No; Nominations	Danjel & Fotini; Ambra	No; Nominations	Third Place (Day 99)	
	Dona	No; Nominations	No; Nominations	Benard & Xheni	Kei & Vivi; Danjel & Fotini	Armela & Damiano; Danjel & Fotini	Adnand & Gastare; Donald & Elisona	Katerina & Lupçe; Danjel & Fotini	Fiorentina & Olsi; Donald & Elisona	No; Nominations	Fiorentina & Olsi; Danjel & Fotini	No; Nominations	Evicted (Day 92)	
	Musa	No; Nominations	No; Nominations	Benard & Xheni	Kei & Vivi; Danjel & Fotini	Armela & Damiano; Danjel & Fotini	Adnand & Gastare; Donald & Elisona	Katerina & Lupçe; Danjel & Fotini	Fiorentina & Olsi; Donald & Elisona	No; Nominations	Fiorentina & Olsi; Danjel & Fotini	No; Nominations	Evicted (Day 92)	
2	Ambra	Not in House					Adnand & Gastare; Enida & Marjus	Fiorentina & Olsi; Danjel & Fotini	Donald & Elisona; Danjel & Fotini	No; Nominations	Fiorentina & Olsi; Danjel & Fotini	Evicted (Day 92)		
2	Elsamed	Not in House					Adnand & Gastare; Enida & Marjus	Fiorentina & Olsi; Danjel & Fotini	Donald & Elisona; Fiorentina & Olsi	No; Nominations	Evicted (Day 85)			
	Donald	Not in House					Adnand & Gastare; Enida & Marjus	Dona & Musa; Ambra	Elsamed; Ambra	Evicted (Day 85)				
	Elisona	Not in House					Adnand & Gastare; Enida & Marjus	Dona & Musa; Ambra	Elsamed; Ambra	Evicted (Day 85)				
	Enida	Not in House					Adnand & Gastare; Ambra & Elsamed	Fiorentina & Olsi; Katerina & Lupçe	Evicted (Day 71)					
	Marjus	Not in House					Adnand & Gastare; Ambra & Elsamed	Fiorentina & Olsi; Katerina & Lupçe	Evicted (Day 71)					
	Adnand	Not in House					Donald & Elisona; Enida & Marjus	Evicted (Day 64)						
	Gastere	Not in House					Donald & Elisona; Enida & Marjus	Evicted (Day 64)						
	Benard	No; Nominations	No; Nominations	Katerina & Lupçe	Armela & Damiano; Kei & Vivi	Armela & Damiano; Katerina & Lupçe	Evicted (Day 50)							
	Xheni	No; Nominations	No; Nominations	Katerina & Lupçe	Armela & Damiano; Kei & Vivi	Armela & Damiano; Katerina & Lupçe	Evicted (Day 50)							
	Armela	No; Nominations	No; Nominations	Nominated	Dona & Musa; Fiorentina & Olsi	Benard & Xheni; Fiorentina & Olsi	Ejected (Day 50)							
1	Damiano	No; Nominations	No; Nominations	Nominated	Dona & Musa; Fiorentina & Olsi	Benard & Xheni; Fiorentina & Olsi	Ejected (Day 50)							
	Kei	Katerina & Lupçe; Adem & Ejona	Danjel & Fotini; Adem & Ejona	Benard & Xheni	Dona & Musa; Fiorentina & Olsi	Evicted (Day 43)								
	Vivi	Katerina & Lupçe; Adem & Ejona	Danjel & Fotini; Adem & Ejona	Benard & Xheni	Dona & Musa; Fiorentina & Olsi	Evicted (Day 43)								
	Ervini	No; Nominations	No; Nominations	Nominated	Evicted (Day 36)									
	Sidrita	No; Nominations	No; Nominations	Nominated	Evicted (Day 36)									
Liridon		No; Nominations	No; Nominations	Evicted (Day 22)										
	Egnajt	No; Nominations	No; Nominations	Ejected (Day 22)										
	Kleodiana	No; Nominations	No; Nominations	Ejected (Day 22)										
	Adem	Kei & Vivi; Fiorentina & Olsi	Danjel & Fotini; Katerina & Lupçe	Evicted (Day 22)										
	Ejona	Kei & Vivi; Fiorentina & Olsi	Danjel & Fotini; Katerina & Lupçe	Evicted (Day 22)										
	Denis	Kei & Vivi; Adem & Ejona	Evicted (Day 15)											
	Gerta	Kei & Vivi; Adem & Ejona	Evicted (Day 15)											
1	Donjeta	No; Nominations	Walked (Day 11)											
Notes		1, 2, 3	1, 4, 5	6	none	7	8, 9	10	11	12	none	13	14	
Against public vote		Adem & Ejona, Kei & Vivi, Denis & Gerta	Adem & Ejona, Danjel & Fotini	Benardi & Xheni, Damiano & Armela, Fiorentina & Olsi, Ervini & Sidrita	Fiorentina & Olsi, Kei & Vivi, Dona & Musa	Fiorentina & Olsi, Benard & Xheni, ~~Armela & Damiano~~, Katerina & Lupçe	Fiorentina & Olsi, Katerina & Lupçe, Enida & Marjus, Adnand & Gastare	Dona & Musa, Danjel & Fotini, Fiorentina & Olsi, Enida & Marjus, Elsamed	Elsamed, Ambra, Donald & Elisona	Ambra, Danjel & Fotini, Elsamed, Dona & Musa, Fiorentina & Olsi, Katerina & Lupçe	Danjel & Fotini, Ambra	Danjel & Fotini, Dona & Musa, Fiorentina & Olsi, Katerina & Lupçe	Katerina & Lupçe, Danjel & Fotini, Fiorentina & Olsi	
Against public vote		Damiano	Adem & Ejona, Danjel & Fotini	Benardi & Xheni, Damiano & Armela, Fiorentina & Olsi, Ervini & Sidrita	Fiorentina & Olsi, Kei & Vivi, Dona & Musa	Fiorentina & Olsi, Benard & Xheni, ~~Armela & Damiano~~, Katerina & Lupçe	Fiorentina & Olsi, Katerina & Lupçe, Enida & Marjus, Adnand & Gastare	Dona & Musa, Danjel & Fotini, Fiorentina & Olsi, Enida & Marjus, Elsamed	Elsamed, Ambra, Donald & Elisona	Ambra, Danjel & Fotini, Elsamed, Dona & Musa, Fiorentina & Olsi, Katerina & Lupçe	Danjel & Fotini, Ambra	Danjel & Fotini, Dona & Musa, Fiorentina & Olsi, Katerina & Lupçe	Katerina & Lupçe, Danjel & Fotini, Fiorentina & Olsi	
Walked		Damiano & Donjeta	none											
Ejected		none	Egnajt & Kleodiana	none		Armela & Damiano	none							
Evicted		Denis & Gerta; Most votes to evict	Adem & Ejona; Most votes to evict	Ervini & Sidrita; Most votes to evict	Kei & Vivi; Most votes to evict	Benard & Xheni; Most votes to evict	Adnand & Gastere; Most votes to evict	Enida & Marjus; Most votes to evict	Donald & Elisona; Most votes to evict	Elsamed; Most votes to evict	Ambra; Most votes to evict	Katerina & Lupçe; Most votes to be Finalist	Katerina & Lupçe; Fewest votes (out of 3)	Fiorentina & Olsi; Fewest votes (out of 2)
Evicted		Damiano; Most votes to return	Liridon; Fewest votes to be a couple	Ervini & Sidrita; Most votes to evict	Kei & Vivi; Most votes to evict	Benard & Xheni; Most votes to evict	Adnand & Gastere; Most votes to evict	Enida & Marjus; Most votes to evict	Donald & Elisona; Most votes to evict	Elsamed; Most votes to evict	Ambra; Most votes to evict	Dona & Musa; Most votes to evict	Danjel & Fotini; Most votes to win	

=== Notes ===
- ^Note 1: Only Couple House housemates could nominate this week.
- ^Note 2: Denis & Gerta were automatically nominated due to rule breaking.
- ^Note 3: Donjeta & Damiano voluntarily left the House on Day 11 due to Donjeta who wanted to leave the house, but Damiano returned by the most public votes on Day 15.
- ^Note 4: Egnajt & Kleodiana were ejected because they didn't accept to play together as a couple.
- ^Note 5: Liridon was evicted because he had the fewest votes to become a couple with any of the girl housemates.
- ^Note 6: Damiano, Olsi and Ervini were automatically nominated with their couple due to rule breaking.
- ^Note 7: Armela & Damiano were ejected because Damiano violated the basic rules of big brother.
- ^Note 8: There were no nominations and eviction on Week 8, instead the public was voted for their favorite couple which would be immune on Week 9 and this couple is Danjel & Fotini.
- ^Note 9: Fiorentina & Olsi and Katerina & Lupçe were automatically nominated for breaking the rules.
- ^Note 10: From Week 10, Ambra & Elsamed are no longer a couple.
- ^Note 11: There were no nominations and eviction on Week 11, instead the public was voted for their favorite couple which would be immune on Week 12 and this couple is Dona & Musa.
- ^Note 12: In a double eviction night, all housemates were nominated for the second round. The one with the most votes was evicted.
- ^Note 13: In a triple eviction night, all housemates were nominated for the second and third round. The one with the most votes in second round was automatical finalist and that couple was Katerina & Lupçe and then in the third round the one with the most votes was evicted.
- ^Note 14: The public voted to win rather than to evict.

== Nominations totals received ==
	Week 2	Week 3	Week 5	Week 6	Week 7	Week 9	Week 10	Week 12	Week 13	Week 14	Total
Danjel	-	3	0	1	1	-	3	2	3	Winner	13
Fotini	-	3	0	1	1	-	3	2	3	Winner	13
Fiorentina	1	1	-	4	3	-	2	2	2	Runners-Up	15
Olsi	1	1	-	4	3	-	2	2	2	Runners-Up	15
Katerina	2	1	1	0	2	-	2	0	0	Third Place	8
Lupçe	2	1	1	0	2	-	2	0	0	Third Place	8
Dona	-	-	0	3	1	3	2	-	2	Evicted	11
Musa	-	-	0	3	1	3	2	-	2	Evicted	11
Ambra	Not in House					3	1	6	3	Evicted	13
Elsamed	Not in House					3	2	6	Evicted		11
Donald	Not in House					2	0	4	Evicted		6
Elisona	Not in House					2	0	4	Evicted		6
Enida	Not in House					5	2	Evicted			7
Marjus	Not in House					5	2	Evicted			7
Adnand	Not in House					5	Evicted				5
Gastere	Not in House					5	Evicted				5
Xheni	-	-	2	0	2	Evicted					4
Benard	-	-	2	0	2	Evicted					4
Armela	-	-	-	2	3	Ejected					5
Damiano	-	-	-	2	3	Ejected					5
Vivi	3	2	1	4	Evicted						10
Kei	3	2	1	4	Evicted						10
Ervini	-	-	-	Evicted							0
Sidrita	-	-	-	Evicted							0
Liridon	-	-	Evicted								0
Egnajt	-	-	Ejected								0
Kleodiana	-	-	Ejected								0
Ejona	4	3	Evicted								7
Adem	4	3	Evicted								7
Denis	-	Evicted									0
Gerta	-	Evicted									0
Donjeta	-	Walked									0
