= SuperSport (Albanian TV network) =

Group of Albanian sports channels

- Industry: Telecommunication
- Founder: Dritan Hoxha
- Headquarters: Tirana, Albania
- Area served: Albania, Kosovo, North Macedonia, Montenegro
- Owner: Top Media Group
- Parent: DigitAlb
- Website: supersport.al

SuperSport is a group of Albanian subscription sports channels operated by the terrestrial pay television company DigitAlb. The channels broadcast a range of different sports such as the English Premier League, Spanish La Liga, German Bundesliga and Bundesliga 2, Dutch Eredivisie, French Ligue 1 and Ligue 2, UEFA Europa League, UEFA Euro, UEFA Europa Conference League, Copa América, FIFA World Cup, ATP 500, ATP 1000, IAAF, etc.

Most of the sports events are broadcasting live and in full HD. Also, 3D broadcasts are available; mainly for specific football matches.

For the main events, there is also supporting studio-based programming along with talk shows, which are produced live before and after the matches. For this purpose, from 2010, DigitAlb invested in several TV studios along with live commentary studios to make live broadcasting possible for up to 9 different events.

SuperSport Albania is available on the Eutelsat W3C (16.0E) satellite, together with the other DigitAlb channels.

== Channels ==
- SuperSport 1 - Sport News, Formula One and LIVE events.
- SuperSport 2 - football matches, SuperSport programs and replays of all sporting events.
- SuperSport 3 - football matches, Premier League channel, SuperSport programs and replays of all sporting events.
- SuperSport 4 - LIVE events only.
- SuperSport 5 - LIVE events only.
- SuperSport 6 - LIVE events only.
- SuperSport 7 - LIVE events only.
- SuperSport Kosova 1 - Premier League matches for Kosovo only on TV Vala & ISP Broadcast.
- SuperSport Kosova 2 - Premier League matches for Kosovo only on TV Vala & ISP Broadcast.
- SuperSport Kosova 3 - Premier League matches for Kosovo only on TV Vala & ISP Broadcast.

=== Discontinued channels ===
- HD4 - LIVE events only
- HD5 - LIVE events only
- HD6 - LIVE events only

== Sport Events ==
=== Football ===
- UEFA Europa League 2024/2027 (Albania)
- UEFA Europa Conference League 2024/2027 (Albania)
- UEFA Nations League 2022/2027 (Albania + Kosovo)
- UEFA European Qualifiers to 2026 FIFA World Cup (Albania + Kosovo)
- UEFA European Qualifiers to UEFA Euro 2028 (Albania + Kosovo)
- UEFA Futsal Euro 2026 (Albania + Kosovo)
- FIFA Club World Cup 2025 (Albania)
- Premier League all matches per week (2024/2028) (Albania & Kosovo)
- La Liga 2021/2031 (Albania)
- Ligue 1 2024/2029 (Albania)
- Eredivisie 2022/2028 (Albania & Kosovo)
- Trendyol Süper Lig 2024/2027 (Albania)
- Super League Greece 2023/2026 (Albania & Kosovo)
- Roshn Saudi League 2023/2027 (Albania & Kosovo)
- Brack Super League 2024/2026 (Albania & Kosovo)

=== Football Cups ===
- FA Cup 2021/2028 (Albania & Kosovo)
- EFL Cup 2024/2027 (Albania & Kosovo)
- The FA Community Shield 2021/2027 (Albania & Kosovo)
- Supercopa de España 2021/2026 (Albania)
- DFB-Pokal 2021/2026 (Albania)
- Coupe de France 2024/2026 (Albania)
- Trophee des Champions 2024/2029 (Albania)
- KNVB Cup 2024/2026 (Albania & Kosovo)

==== Tennis ====
- Wimbledon 2022/2026 (Albania)
- ATP World Tours (2020/2026)

==== Basketball ====
- FIBA World Cup Qualifiers 2027 (Albania & Kosovo)

==== Volleyball ====
- 2025 FIVB Men's Volleyball World Championship
- 2025 FIVB Women's Volleyball World Championship

==== Motosports ====
- Formula One 2025/2026 (Albania)

==== Combat Sports ====
- UFC (2020/2026)

== See also ==
- Dritan Hoxha
- Top Channel
- DigitAlb
