= UTV =

UTV may refer to:

== Motorsport ==
- UTV, utility vehicle
- Side by Side (UTV), small off-road vehicle

== Broadcasting ==
- UTV (TV channel) (formerly Ulster Television), TV channel in Northern Ireland owned by ITV plc
  - UTV Live, news service
  - UTV Ireland, now Virgin Media Three, TV channel owned by Virgin Media Television
  - UTV Media, now Wireless Group, broadcasting and New Media company based in Belfast, Northern Ireland (the former parent company of UTV)
  - UTV2, a defunct British television channel
- UTV Software Communications, diversified media conglomerate in India
  - UTV Motion Pictures
- UTV News (Albania), Albanian news channel
- Uganda Television, merged into Uganda Broadcasting Corporation in 2004
- UTV Romania
- Ürümqi Television Station (UTV), local television station in Ürümqi, Xinjiang, China
- U.TV, former branding of CKVU-TV
- Universal Television, TV production subsidiary of NBCUniversal Television Group & TV production arm of NBC
- Universal TV, a television channel owned by NBCUniversal
- United Television Ghana, a Ghanaian television channel
- U (streaming service), TV streaming service owned by BBC Studios

== Other ==
- UltimateTV (online service), former website about television-related matters
