= Wake Up (Albanian TV program) =

Albanian morning television and radio program

- Genre: Morning show
- Created by: Ledion Liço
- Presented by: Blendi Salaj (2022–present), Enxhi Nasufi (2022–present), Neada Muçaj (2022–present)
- Country of origin: Albania
- Original language: Albanian

Original release
- Network: Top Channel; DigitAlb
- Release: 2008 – present

Wake Up, also known as Wake Up në Top Channel (Albanian: [ˈwɛɪk ʌp nə tɔp ˈtʃænəl]), is an Albanian morning television and radio program broadcast on weekdays on Top Channel and Top Albania Radio. The program includes news, interviews, cultural commentary, and entertainment segments.

== Format ==
Episodes of Wake Up include: - Summaries of national and international news. - Interviews with public figures, experts, and cultural personalities. - Discussions on arts, music, and lifestyle topics. - Interactive segments, including quiz games. - Music selections from Albanian and international artists.

The format combines informational content with lighter entertainment for a morning audience.

== Presenters ==
Current presenters:

- Blendi Salaj (2022–present), journalist and media activist, previously worked at A2CNN.
- Enxhi Nasufi (2022–present), singer and television presenter, winner of the ninth season of Dancing with the Stars Albania (2023).
- Neada Muçaj (2022–present), presenter and journalist.

Former presenters:

- Eno Popi (2013–2023), original host of the program.
- Mira Kazhani (2013–2015), journalist and television personality.
- Isli Islami (2015–2017), journalist.
- Ori Nebiaj (2017–2019), presenter, journalist, and politician.

== Guests ==
The program regularly features guests from various fields such as music, politics, art, and culture. Guests contribute to discussions on current events and cultural topics.

== Broadcast ==
Wake Up airs Monday to Friday from 07:00 to 10:00 AM from Top Channel’s studios in Tirana. It is also broadcast on Top Albania Radio and available on digital platforms.

== Awards ==
In 2015, Wake Up received the Best Morning Show award at the IMA Awards.
