= Top Media Group =

Albanian media company

- Type: Privately held company
- Industry: Media, Broadcasting, Radio broadcasting, Television production, Film production
- Founded: 1998
- Founder: Dritan Hoxha
- Headquarters: Tirana, Albania
- Area served: Albania
- Key people: Lori Hoxha (CEO)
- Products: Television broadcasting; Radio broadcasting; Film production; Cable and satellite services; Print and digital media
- Owner: Hoxha family
- Divisions: See Subsidiaries

Top Media Group (known simply as Top Media) is an Albanian media company founded in 1998 by businessman Dritan Hoxha. Headquartered in Tirana, the company has grown into one of the largest and most influential media conglomerates in Albania. It initially started with the creation of Top Albania Radio and later expanded to various audiovisual and print media outlets. Top Media Group is the parent company of the national television channel Top Channel. Following the death of its founder, members of the Hoxha family took over the management of the company.

== Subsidiaries ==
- Top Channel – national television broadcaster
  - Top Channel Films – film production and distribution
- Top Albania Radio – radio station
- DigitAlb – cable and satellite service provider
  - Bang Bang – children's genre channel
  - Çufo – children's television channel
  - Junior TV – teenage genre channel
  - SuperSport – sports network
  - Top News – 24-hour news channel
  - My Music Radio – radio music channel
  - musicAL – tv music channel
- Top News – 24-hour news channel
- Top Gold Radio – radio station
- Lori Caffe – coffee company
- Gazeta Shqip – news portal (operated as print newspaper from 2004 to 2016)
- Video Graphic Agency (VGA Studio) – motion graphics production company
- Imperial Cinemas (95% ownership) – cinema chain
- Dritan Hoxha Media Foundation – media foundation

== See also ==
- Mass media in Albania
