= Armela =

Armela is a feminine given name. Notable people with the name include:

- Armela Krasniqi, Albanian journalist and public official
- Armela Tukaj (born 2001), Albanian football defender
