= Esdalin Gorani =

Albanian dancer

Esdalin Gorani (born in Kavajë) is an Albanian stage dancer/choreographer who performs for Albania's largest national broadcaster, Top Channel. He began his career performing for Folkloric Ensemble's "Besa" under the guidance of Ibrahim Roçi.S.
