= Digi Plus =

Albanian television channel

Coordinates: 41.322972°N 19.821761°E

- Country: Albania
- Network: DigitAlb
- Affiliates: Television
- Headquarters: Tirana, Albania

Programming
- Language: Albanian
- Picture format: 16:9

Ownership
- Owner: DigitAlb

History
- Launched: July 2004
- Replaced by: Family HD

Links
- Website: digitalb.al

Digi Plus (or simply Plus) was an Albanian television channel broadcasting American, Italian and German series. It was founded in 2004 when DigitAlb was created.

== Programming ==
Name	Type	Country	Aired day
Days of Our Lives	Soap opera	United States	Monday–Friday
Dollhouse	Science fiction	United States	Monday–Friday
El fantasma de Elena	Telenovela	United States/Spanish	Monday–Friday
Lui e lei	TV Series	Italy	Sundays
Community	Sitcom	United States	Monday–Friday
