= Rudina Xhunga =

Albanian journalist and writer (born 1972)

- Born: June 22, 1972 (age 53)
- Occupations: Journalist; Writer; Television presenter
- Years active: 1993–present
- Television: Shqip me Rudina Xhunga (2004–2015); Shqip nga Rudina Xhunga (2021–present)
- Spouse: Dritan Hila (m. 2010)
- Children: 1

Rudina Xhunga (born 22 June 1972) is an Albanian journalist, writer and television presenter. She is the founder and director of the online media platform Dritare.net. Xhunga is best known as the host of the political talk show Shqip me Rudina Xhunga, which aired on Top Channel from 3 May 2002 until 7 September 2015. The program was later relaunched under the title Shqip nga Rudina Xhunga and currently streams on Dritare.net via YouTube.

== Career ==
Xhunga began her career writing for the newspaper Aleanca from 1993 to 1995. She subsequently worked as a cultural journalist for several leading newspapers, like Koha Jonë, where she also contributed feature reports and special sections for what was considered the first independent newspaper in Albania.

In November 1998, she made her television debut as the host of the weekly political show Dritare on Albanian Public Television (RTSH), replacing Blendi Fevziu. The program featured in-studio interviews with prominent domestic and international political figures.

Xhunga joined Top Channel, where she launched Shqip me Rudina Xhunga. Airing on Monday nights, the show explored current affairs and political developments across Albania, Kosovo, and North Macedonia, often addressing broader national and historical topics.

In addition to her television work, Xhunga is also the author of several books, including Të dua për sfond, Preja e një martese të lodhur, Sikur Ana..., Tregimet e Pitilushes, and Përrallat e Pitilushes.

In recent years, she has hosted the program Dritare on News24, following earlier engagements with Vizion Plus. Both Dritare and Shqip now operate as online shows through her web platform.

== Personal life ==
Xhunga has been married to journalist and political commentator Dritan Hila since 2010. They have one daughter.

== Selected bibliography ==
- Të dua për sfond : 13 poezi, tregime, intervista – 1996, Sh.B. Dudaj
- Sikur Ana... – 2005, Sh.B. Dudaj
- Preja e një martese të lodhur – 2005, Sh.B. Dudaj
- 12 porositë e Arbën Xhaferit – 2012, Sh.B. Dudaj
- Shkrimtarët e shekullit : 31 intervista në bibliotekën e botës – 2014, Sh.B. Dudaj
- Edhe një Shqip: 31 intervista – 2015, Sh.B. Dudaj
- Përrallat e Pitilushes – 2016, Dritare Publishing
- Tregimet e Pitilushes – 2020, Dritare Publishing
