= A1 Report =

Albanian television channel

- Country: Albania
- Headquarters: Tirana

Programming
- Language: Albanian

Ownership
- Owner: 2K Group sh.p.k

History
- Founded: 9 May 2000
- Launched: 2002
- Founder: Koço Kokëdhima
- Closed: 2016
- Former names: TV Ballkan, A1, A1 Report

Availability

Terrestrial
- Analogue: PAL

A1 Report (later known as A1 News) was an Albanian private television news channel based in Tirana. Founded by businessman Koço Kokëdhima, publisher of the widely circulated newspaper Shekulli and the magazine "Spektër", the station operated as a 24-hour news broadcaster. It was among the early private television channels that emerged in Albania after the collapse of the communist regime.

== History ==
The channel originally launched in 2002 under the name "TV Ballkan", before shortly rebranding as "A1 TV". During its early years, the station attempted to broaden its audience by combining news programming with entertainment and talk shows, including programs such as "Papparazzi" and "Hienat". It also became known for economy-oriented shows such as "A1 Biznes" and "Kapital", which were uncommon on Albanian television at the time.

A1 TV later evolved into "A1 Report", focusing primarily on rolling news coverage and current affairs. The channel updated its news programming continuously throughout the day and became part of the growing all-news television sector in Albania during the 2000s. It would later be linked with the online news outlet Shqiptarja.com.

In January 2007, the channel expanded its programming by broadcasting films and entertainment content alongside news coverage. Although primarily marketed as a news channel, A1 became known for airing the latest international films and television productions.

In 2016, Italian journalist Carlo Bollino ended his collaboration with the station and launched a separate broadcaster, Report TV. Following his departure, the channel was rebranded again as "A1 News".

The channel ceased operations in 2016, after its broadcasting licence was revoked by the Albanian Audiovisual Media Authority.
