= Dritan Hila =

Albanian journalist and diplomat (born 1966)

Deputy Minister of Defence
- In office September 2013 – March 2015
- Prime Minister: Edi Rama

Personal details
- Born: August 28, 1966 (age 59) Tirana, PR Albania
- Spouse: Rudina Xhunga (m. 2010)
- Education: University of Tirana
- Occupation: Journalist, publicist, diplomat

Dritan Hila (born August 28, 1966) is an Albanian journalist, publicist, former deputy Minister of Defence of Albania from 2013 to 2015 and former diplomat.

== Life and education ==
He was born in Tirana on 28 August 1966. Hila graduated from the Faculty of Economics at the University of Tirana in 1989, majoring in Trade and Circulation. After graduation, he worked as an economist in state institutions.

== Diplomatic career ==
In 2000, he joined the Albanian diplomatic corps. From 2002 to 2004, he served as consul in Bari, and from 2005 to 2006 as consul in Milan.

In 2011, he left the diplomatic service following disagreements with the Ministry of Foreign Affairs of Albania, over controversial issues such as the maritime border agreement with Greece, the national census, and the stance on the report by MEP Dick Marty. After his departure, he initiated legal proceedings against the institution, which he won.

== Media career ==
Since 2008, Hila has been active in the Albanian media as a publicist and commentator, covering foreign policy and current affairs. He has contributed to the newspapers Shqip, Gazeta Shqiptare, MAPO, and Shekulli.

He has appeared on television panels at Top Channel, News 24, Ora News, and Scan. He hosted the talk show Arena on Ora News. Currently, he is a journalist at the platform Dritare.net and appears as a political analyst on various TV programs.

== Personal life ==
Dritan Hila is married to journalist Rudina Xhunga.
