= Super Sonic TV =

Albanian music television channel

- Type: Television music channel
- Country: Albania
- Headquarters: Tirana

Programming
- Language: Albanian

Ownership
- Owner: Super Sonic sh.p.k
- Key people: Diana Hoxha Cerova (Administrator)

History
- Founded: 28 January 2014; 12 years ago
- Founder: Altin Çela

Links
- Website: super-sonic.tv

Super Sonic TV is an Albanian music television channel and former record label. Founded in 1992 as one of the earliest record labels in Albania, it played an important role in the publication, distribution and promotion of Albanian music, later expanding into music television broadcasting.

== History ==
=== Music label ===
Super Sonic began operations in 1992, initially producing and distributing audio and video cassettes before transitioning to CDs and DVDs. In 2001, the company became a limited liability company (sh.p.k.) and began producing digital audio and video content electronically.

Over the years, some of the most prominent Albanian artists employed Super Sonic for the publication of their albums and recordings, many of which left a notable impact on modern Albanian music.

From 2003 onward, Super Sonic published all editions of the music festival Kënga Magjike, as well as a series of seasonal compilations such as “Hitet e Verës” and “Vjeshtë – Dimër”, featuring the most popular contemporary releases of that time.

The label released music from a wide range of artists, including Genta Ismajli, Tingulli 3nt, Nora Istrefi, Etno Engjujt, Elita 5, Adelina Ismaili, Jehona Sopi, Eliza Hoxha, Adrian Gaxha, Big Mama, Vesa Luma and many others.

Its folk music catalog included artists such as Artiola Toska, Bujar Qamili, Merita Halili, Sinan Vllasaliu, Gjyste Vulaj, Amarda, etc.

With the digitalization of the music industry, Super Sonic adapted its distribution model, making Albanian music available not only on physical CDs and DVDs but also on major digital platforms including iTunes, Amazon MP3, Spotify, Google Play Music, Deezer, Napster and Tidal.

=== Transition to television ===
As Albanian music production expanded and the demand for visual music broadcasting increased, Super Sonic launched Super Sonic TV in 2006. The channel was established to air the extensive music archive collected by the label, along with other content from Albanian artists across the world. It soon developed into one of the leading Albanian music television channels, offering high-quality programming and music videos.

=== Broadcast availability ===
Until recently, Super Sonic TV was broadcast in Albania via the DigitAlb satellite platform and ABCOM cable network. In Kosovo, it was available through the IPKO cable platform. It was also accessible in the United States and Canada via the IPTV service, TVALB, making it one of the most-watched Albanian music channels internationally.
