= UK TV =

UK TV may refer to:

- Television in the United Kingdom
- UKTV, a television network in the UK
- BBC UKTV, a BBC TV channel in Australia and New Zealand
- Granada UKTV, a former name of ITV Choice, a channel broadcasting to parts of the Middle East, Africa, Asia and Malta
