= Vikena Kamenica =

Albanian opera singer and musical-theatre actress (born 20th century)

- Born: Tirana, Albania
- Origin: Albania
- Genres: Opera; Operetta; Musical theatre; Jazz; Light music
- Occupation: Mezzo-soprano
- Instrument: vocals
- Years active: 2000 – present
- Member of: National Theatre of Opera and Ballet of Albania
- Partner: Erik Tauzi

Vikena Kamenica is an Albanian mezzo-soprano and soloist at the National Theatre of Opera and Ballet of Albania. She began performing in light-music venues before transitioning to opera and musical theatre.

== Early life and education ==
Kamenica was born into a musical family, the daughter of tenor Guri Kamenica and mezzo-soprano Vera Kamenica. She grew up around the National Theatre of Opera and Ballet, where she developed an early interest in classical music.

In the early 2000s, before obtaining formal academic training, she performed in jazz venues in Tirana. Kamenica completed her degree in vocal performance in 2001. That same year, she made her debut as Cherubino in Mozart's The Marriage of Figaro at the National Theatre of Opera and Ballet.

== Career ==
=== Transition to musical theatre ===
After her debut, Kamenica appeared in musical-theatre productions, including West Side Story and A Century of Broadway.

=== Operatic roles ===
In 2007, she performed the title role in Bizet's Carmen, directed by Patricia Panton Flores. She later portrayed Violetta in Verdi's La Traviata, directed by Massimo Ranieri; and Rosina in Rossini's The Barber of Seville, among other roles.

=== Other work ===
Kamenica has also participated in concert productions, such as Songs of the Century, performing selections from international popular music.

In 2025, she served as a jury member on the Albanian diaspora talent show Yjet Shqiptarë të Diasporës.

== Songs ==
- "Valsi i Lumturisë" (with Genc Tukiçi)
- "Ku Shkoi Vallë Ai Djalë" (with Alma Bektashi)
- "Të Shtrenjtët e S’më" (solo)
- "Lule t’bukura sjell pranvera" (with Sidrit Bejleri)
- "Mesnatë" (solo)
- "Një Flutur" (solo)
- "S'mendoja" (solo)
- "Për Ty Çelin Mijëra Mëngjesë" (solo)
- "Djaloshi dhe shi" (with Sherif Merdani)
- "Kjo Lanëtë" (solo)
- "Mirëmëngjes Student" (solo)
- "Suos Le Ciel De Paris" (with Kastriot Tusha)
- "Erë Pranverore" (solo)
- "Tell Him" (Rosela Gjylbegu featuring Vikena Kamenica)
- "Serenatë për nusen" (solo)
- "Stacioni im" (solo)
- "Xhaketa e kuqe" (solo)
