= Dritan Hoxha =

Albanian entrepreneur and media mogul (1968-2008)

- Born: 16 October 1968; Kukës, Albania
- Died: 23 May 2008 (aged 39); Tirana, Albania
- Occupations: Founder and former CEO of Top Media Group
- Years active: 1998–2008
- Organization: Dritan Hoxha Media Foundation (founded posthumously)
- Known for: Pioneering figure in Albanian television, innovator in the Albanian media industry
- Television: Top Channel
- Spouse: Vjollca Hoxha
- Children: 4
- Website: fm-dritanhoxha.al

Dritan Hoxha (Albanian: [dɾiˈtan ˈhɔdʒa]; 16 October 1968 – 23 May 2008) was an Albanian entrepreneur and media mogul, best known as the founder of Top Media, Albania's largest media company.

Hoxha, who started his business career as a coffee importer for Lori Caffe, founded the Top Media group in 1998.

== Early life ==
Dritan Hoxha was born on October 16, 1968, in Kukës, Albania. During his childhood, his family relocated to the Laprakë neighborhood in Tirana, where he spent his formative years. Hoxha began his professional journey as a coffee importer, establishing the Lori Caffe brand in 1995, which marked his initial venture into the business world.

Hoxha's early involvement in commerce and his passion for technology and innovation contributed to his later work in the media industry, where he played a role in the development of private broadcasting in the country.

== Media career ==
Hoxha's ventures into media began with the establishment of Top Albania Radio in 1998, which quickly grew into one of the biggest radio stations in Albania. It branched into television with the founding of the broadcaster Top Channel in 2001 and the pay-TV provider DigitAlb in 2004. The growth of Hoxha's business ventures accelerated between 2004 and 2008, expanding into the news publication Shqip (2006) and the 24/7 news channel Top News (2007), as well as exclusive themed TV channels such as My Music.

In 2008, DigitAlb became the first European Platform with six High Definition Channels and the second in the world. This was a big achievement for Albania. He clashed with Prime Minister Sali Berisha over satellite broadcasting rights. Berisha fined Hoxha's group 13 million euros, but they later reached a compromise.

== Top Media ==
On 14 February 1998, Dritan Hoxha founded the Top Media Group shortly after creating Top Albania Radio. After his death, Hoxha's family took over operations of the media enterprise.

List	Type	Launch date
Top Albania Radio	Radio station	14 February 1998
VGA Studio	Television branding company	4 May 2000
Top Channel	Television network	20 December 2001
DigitAlb	Pay-TV provider and production company	15 July 2004
My Music	Music television channel	2004
Gazeta Shqip	News publication	13 March 2006
Top News	News television channel	February 2007
Dritan Hoxha Media Foundation	Media education and charity organization	December 2010 (post-humously)

== Death ==
On 23 May 2008, at approximately 01:50, Dritan Hoxha crashed his car, a Ferrari 599 GTB Fiorano with the license plate DK 3892 H, into a maple tree in a flower garden along the Bajram Curri Boulevard in Tirana, near the Lana River. The car split in two and was completely destroyed upon impact. Hoxha initially survived the crash and was extracted from the vehicle a few minutes later. However, he suddenly died en route to the Tirana Military Hospital.

== Awards and honors ==
- In February 2012, the Municipality of Pristina named a street in his honor, recognizing his efforts in unifying Albanians through cross-border media initiatives.
- In November 2012, the city of Vlora posthumously awarded Hoxha the title of Citizen of Honour (Qytetar Nderi) during the 100th anniversary of Albanian independence, for his contributions to Albanian unity and culture through media.
- In September 2021, Marin Barleti University conferred upon him the title of Doctor Honoris Causa in recognition of his outstanding achievements in media and communication.
- In December 2023, Hoxha was posthumously awarded the title of Grand Master (Mjeshtër i Madh) by Albanian President Bajram Begaj for his pioneering contributions to Albanian visual media.
