= Gazeta Shqip =

Newspaper

- Type: Online newspaper
- Format: Formerly print, currently online-only
- Owner: Top Media Group
- Founded: March 13, 2006
- Ceased publication: July 16, 2016 (print edition)
- Language: Albanian
- Headquarters: Tirana, Albania
- Website: www.gazeta-shqip.com

Gazeta Shqip (English: Shqip Newspaper) is a newspaper published in Albania that is a part of Top Media Group together with Top Albania Radio, Top Gold Radio, part of pay-TV platform DigitAlb, Top Channel, Top News, VGA Studio, My Music Radio, and MusicAL.

Gazeta Shqip was launched in print format on 13 March 2006.

After more than 3000 publications, Gazeta Shqip closed the print version on 16 July 2016, and today, continues in an online format, with a 12-year archive.

Starting in April 2019, Gazeta Shqip Online redesigned and relaunched with a new website, for desktop and mobile. They decided to retain its authenticity in the logo, only allowing for some changes in the image retention.

They invested in this traditional media, to reach more audiences. Newspaper Gazeta Shqip Online aims are transparency and informing the public.

Gazeta Shqip's most valued services are their quality and independent journalism.

Currently, Gazeta Shqip Online has over 20 million clicks per month, according to official Google Analytics statistics, giving it a place in the top 5 most-visited websites in Albania.
