= Dritan Hoxha Media Foundation =

Albanian media foundation founded in 2010

- Fondacioni Mediatik "Dritan Hoxha"
- Founded: December 2010
- Founders: Hoxha family
- Type: Non-profit organization
- Purpose: media culture education
- Headquarters: Tirana, Albania
- Administrator: Vjollca Hoxha
- General director: Sara Hoxha
- Parent organization: Top Media Group
- Website: https://fm-dritanhoxha.al

The Dritan Hoxha Foundation (Albanian: Fondacioni Dritan Hoxha) is an Albanian non-profit foundation established in December 2010. It operates in the fields of media and culture and is affiliated with Top Media. The foundation is named after Dritan Hoxha, founder of Top Media, following his death.

The organization has been involved in initiatives related to journalism, media development, culture, and charitable activities in Albania.

== History ==
The foundation was created in December 2010 by the Hoxha family to commemorate Dritan Hoxha, founder of Top Media Group. According to published reports, its establishment aimed to support activities related to media development and cultural initiatives in Albania.

== Activities ==
The foundation has been involved in various activities, including:

- Media-related training initiatives
- Cultural and artistic projects
- Public discussions on social and media-related topics
- Support for journalism and media forums
- Assistance for selected cultural and artistic projects
- Charitable initiatives aimed at individuals and families in need

== Television projects ==
The foundation has supported or collaborated on several television projects broadcast in Albania, including:

- StarTop (2022), a program focused on technology, innovation, and entrepreneurship.
- Në Sofrën Shqiptare (2024), a television series exploring Albanian culinary traditions and regional food culture.
- Jashtë Vijës së Verdhë (2024), a documentary-style program focusing on areas outside central Tirana.
