= Fiks Fare =

Albanian daily television show

- Genre: Investigative satire
- Created by: Filip Çakuli
- Inspired by: Striscia la notizia
- Written by: Filip Çakuli
- Presented by: Dorian Ramaliu, Olta Gixhari
- Country of origin: Albania

Original release
- Network: Top Channel
- Release: 19 December 2002

Fiks Fare is a daily show on Albanian television station Top Channel. It premiered on 19 December 2002. It is currently co-hosted by Dorian Ramaliu and Olta Gixhari.

Fiks Fare uses humor and satire to discuss negative aspects of society, such as corruption, fraud, law-breaking by public officials, human rights violations and development issues. It includes entertainment elements such as dance and music. Its popularity and its simple language has made it an important means of raising awareness.

Fiks Fare is quoted in the academic journal Current Anthropology as an innovative format of activism in the field of anti-corruption.

It is also based on the Italian entertainment program Striscia la notizia.

== See also ==
- Striscia la notizia
