= Top News =

Albanian television news channel

- Type: 24/7 news channel
- Country: Albania
- Broadcast area: Eutelsat 16A
- Network: DigitAlb
- Headquarters: Rruga "17 Nëntori", Nr. 20, Mëzez Kodër, Kashar

Programming
- Language: Albanian
- Picture format: 576i (SDTV 16:9)

Ownership
- Parent: Top Media Group
- Key people: Lorela Hoxha (administrator); Elert Yzeri (editor-in-chief)
- Sister channels: Top Channel

History
- Founded: 18 December 2006
- Launched: 12 February 2007
- Founder: Dritan Hoxha

Availability

Terrestrial
- DigitAlb: Channel 2, Albania

Streaming media
- Top News Live

Top News is a 24-hour Albanian television news channel owned by Top Media Group. The channel was launched on 12 February 2007 as the first dedicated rolling news television station in Albania and operates as a sister channel to Top Channel. It broadcasts news, political debates, talk shows and current affairs programming in the Albanian language.

Top News is distributed through the digital platform DigitAlb and is available via terrestrial television, satellite, cable and online streaming services.

== History ==
Top News began experimental broadcasts on 18 December 2006. During its planning stage, the channel was reportedly intended to launch under the name "DigiNews" before adopting the final name Top News. Regular broadcasting officially started on 12 February 2007 under the ownership of Top Media Group.

The channel was established during a period of rapid expansion for Albanian private media. Its parent company had previously launched Top Albania Radio in 1998 and Top Channel television in 2001. The group expanded further with the creation of the digital broadcasting platform DigitAlb.

Top News gained wider public attention during major national events, particularly the 2018–2019 Albanian student protests and coverage of the 2019 Albania earthquake. During this period, the channel expanded its online presence through livestreaming and digital distribution platforms.

On 1 January 2021, Top News introduced a redesigned on-air presentation package and began high-definition broadcasting. The channel also adopted a simplified logo as part of the rebranding.

Following the death of Top Media founder Dritan Hoxha in 2008, ownership and management of the company passed to members of his family, led by Vjollca Hoxha.

== Programming ==
Top News primarily broadcasts rolling news coverage, live reports and political discussion programs. The channel has also aired documentaries, magazine programs and simulcasts of selected productions from Top Channel.

- Breaking
- Business In
- Cartel
- Inside Story
- Lindje Perëndim
- Open
- Ora e Tiranës
- Top Talk
