= South East European Media Observatory =

South East European Media Observatory (SEE Media Observatory) is a network of regional organizations whose aim is to enhance media freedom and pluralism, and to influence media reforms in South East Europe. It works to address impediments to the democratic development of free media systems and provides a localized and regional instrument for media research. SEE Media Observatory monitors investigative journalism and civil society engagement in the region to attempt to remediate issues of integrity in media, with a specific focus on media ownership and finances. The organization also seeks to offer a regional framework for debates, consultations, and coalitions among main stakeholders.

In particular, in 2013 and 2014, the SEE Media Observatory concentrated on media integrity in Albania, Bosnia and Herzegovina, Croatia, Macedonia and Serbia.

== Partners of the project ==
Project partners are:

- Albanian Media Institute (Albania);
- Media and Civil Society Development Foundation „Mediacenter” (Bosnia and Herzegovina);
- Investigative Journalism Center (Croatia);
- Center for Independent Journalism (Hungary);
- Press Council of Kosovo (Kosovo);
- Macedonian Institute for Media (Macedonia);
- Montenegro Media Institute (Montenegro);
- Novi Sad School of Journalism (Serbia);
- Peace Institute (Slovenia);
- P24 – Platform for Independent Journalism (Turkey).
