= Armela Krasniqi =

Albanian journalist and public official (born 1976)

Chairwoman of the Audiovisual Media Authority (AMA)
- Incumbent
- Assumed office 7 July 2021

Personal details
- Born: 26 November 1976 (age 49) Tirana, PSR Albania
- Children: 2
- Education: University of Tirana
- Occupation: Public official Journalist

Armela Krasniqi (born 26 November 1976) is an Albanian journalist and public official currently serving as the Chairwoman of the Audiovisual Media Authority (AMA) of Albania. Previously, she served as the director of the Albanian Telegraphic Agency (ATSH).

== Early life and education ==
Krasniqi was born in Tirana, Albania. She graduated from the Journalism Department in the Faculty of History and Philology at the University of Tirana in 1999. She also completed an internship at the Cabinet Office and 10 Downing Street in the United Kingdom with a scholarship from the British Council.

== Career ==
During her high school years (1992–1995), Krasniqi worked part-time as a reporter for Radio Tirana, contributing to morning and socio-economic programs and occasionally hosting a radio show.

She later continued her media career as a reporter for Shijak TV and the Albanian Public Broadcaster (RTSH). Over time, she held positions such as Director of the Directorate of Current Affairs at RTSH, news edition editor at RTSH, Shijak TV, and TVA, as well as program host at RTSH and News24.

She also served as the spokesperson of the Socialist Party during its time in opposition.

Prior to her current role, she was the director of the Albanian Telegraphic Agency (ATSH). During her tenure, she was elected to the board of the European Alliance of News Agencies (EANA) and served as President of the Alliance of Balkan News Agencies – Southeast Europe (ABNA-SEE).

On July 7, 2021, the Parliament of Albania appointed Krasniqi as Chairperson of the Audiovisual Media Authority (AMA).

== Literary work ==
=== Poetry collections ===
- Fundi i portreteve (The End of Portraits), 1992
- Eklipsi i heshtjes (Eclipse of Silence), 1995
