= Top Albania Radio =

Albania national private radio

- Country: Albania
- Broadcast area: Albania (radio); Worldwide (online)
- Network: DigitAlb
- Headquarters: Tirana, Albania

Programming
- Language: Albanian
- Picture format: 576i (SDTV 16:9); 1080i (HDTV 16:9)

Ownership
- Owner: Top Media Group (Hoxha family, 80%); Zhuljeta Lamaj (20%)
- Parent: Top Media Group
- Key people: Ledion Liço (Executive Director)
- Sister channels: Top Channel; My Music; Top Gold Radio

History
- Launched: 14 February 1998; 28 years ago
- Founder: Dritan Hoxha

Links
- Webcast: Listen live
- Website: topalbaniaradio.com

Availability

Streaming media
- Top Albania Radio Website: Top Albania Radio Live Stream

Top Albania Radio (TAR) is a national private radio station and television channel based in Tirana, Albania. It began broadcasting on 14 February 1998. The station is part of Top Media Group, which also includes Top Channel and the DigitAlb pay per view platform.

== History ==
Top Albania Radio was founded by businessman Dritan Hoxha. In 2000, the station obtained a national broadcasting license, expanding its coverage to approximately 95 percent of Albania’s territory. During this period, its staff consisted largely of young professionals, many of whom later transitioned to successful television careers. Popular programs from this era included "Good Morning Albania", "Një këngë për ty" and "Disco Lancio". Beginning in 2002, the station strengthened its journalistic profile by increasing the frequency of its news bulletins to as many as nineteen per day.

Today, Top Albania Radio’s programming features a mix of Albanian and international music, along with news updates, talk shows and various entertainment formats. Among its most popular programs is Wake Up, a morning news talk show. The station broadcasts 24 hours a day across Albania and is also available internationally through pay per view platform DigitAlb and its official website.

== Programming ==
- Wake Up – Morning news and talk
- Live From Tirana – Music and entertainment
- Ndryshe – Cultural and social topics
- Good Morning Albania
- Një këngë për ty (A Song for You)
- Disco Lancio
