= UTV News (TV channel) =

Albanian television news channel

- Country: Albania

History
- Launched: 199? - as (Teuta Tv) 2007 - as (UFO education) 2010 - as (UTV news)

Links
- Website: www.utv-news.tv

Availability

Terrestrial
- Analogue: PAL (ch 27 UHF in Tirana)
- Digital: DVB-T

UTV News is a television channel broadcasting news only, updated every minute since 2010, from Tirana, Albania. Originally started as Teuta TV based in Durrës, it was re-branded to UFO Education in 2007. The station is affiliated with UFO Albanian University in Tirana, Albania.

== TV programs made and broadcast by UTV News ==
Original name	Format	Origin
Fakt	Talk show	Albania
Edicioni i Pare	News	Albania
Ata po Thone	Political show	Albania
Ora 0	News	Albania
Fundjava Kult	Culture	Albania
Crime Zone	Talk show	Albania
Fun Page	Entertainment Show	Albania
Ex Libris	Culture	Albania
