= Audiovisual Media Authority (Albania) =

Government agency of Albania

Audiovisual Media Authority (AMA)
- Autoriteti i Mediave Audiovizive (AMA)
- Logo of Audiovisual Media Authority

Statutory authority overview
- Formed: 28 May 2007
- Jurisdiction: Albania
- Headquarters: Tirana
- Statutory authority executive: Armela Krasniqi, Chairperson
- Website: ama.gov.al

The Audiovisual Media Authority (AMA; Albanian: Autoriteti i Mediave Audiovizive) is a statutory authority of the Albanian Government responsible for licensing and regulating the broadcasting and telecommunications industries in Albania. The organisation is authorised to investigate complaints made regarding programmes, issue warnings and fines, or even suspend the license of the radio or television station. The AMA was formed in July 2007.

== Structure ==
The AMA is run by 7 members (including the chairman and vice-chairman ) appointed by the Albanian Parliament for a period of 5 years, with the right of renewal only once. Among the 7 members of the AMA's, only the chairman and vice-chairman are full-time engaged in the day-to-day work activity of AMA.

Current Members:

1. Armela Krasniqi - Chairperson

2. Desada Metaj - Deputy Chairperson

3. Joanna Allushi - Member

4. Jetmir Halilaj - Member

5. Aurela Bicja - Member

6. Besian Zogaj - Member

7. George Hamiti - Member
