= DigitAlb =

Albanian TV platform and broadcast media company

DigitAlb Sh.A
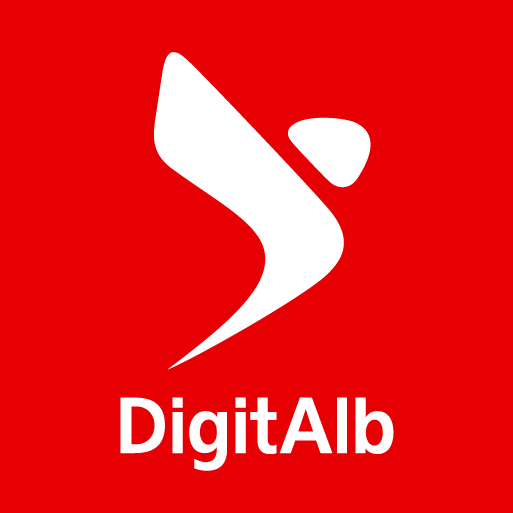
- Type: Joint stock company
- Industry: Telecommunication, publishing
- Genre: Albanian TV platform
- Founded: 15 July 2004; 22 years ago
- Founder: Dritan Hoxha
- Headquarters: Tirana, Albania
- Area served: Albania, Kosovo, Europe (via Satellite and OTT), North America (via OTT), Australia (via OTT)
- Products: TV channels with a variety of programs
- Services: Digital MPEG-4 signal TV channels with pay (pay-per-view)
- Owner: Union Distribucion Service Albania (10%); DEM Capital (10%); Union Group (10%); Loresa (30%); E&E Investment (10%); Others (30%)
- Parent: Top Media Group Sh.A
- Subsidiaries: Top Channel; Top News; Gazeta Shqip; Top Albania Radio; Top Gold Radio; Shqip magazine VGA Studio; My Music Radio; Melody TV; SuperSport
- Website: digitalb.al

DigitAlb Sh.A is an Albanian media, digital satellite and terrestrial TV platform based in Tirana, Albania. The TV platform began terrestrial broadcasts on 15 July 2004, and satellite broadcasts by the end of that year. At the same time, DigitAlb began broadcasting some channels of defunct AlbaniaSat's satellite platform SAT + which eventually went bankrupt. DigitAlb closely collaborates with absorbing sports package SuperSport while having introduced wireless DVB-H technology for wireless TV for the first time in Albania since 2006. On 15 July 2022, to celebrate 18 years, Digitalb launched its OTT service.

The company forms part of Top Media Group together with Top Channel, Top News, Top Albania Radio, Top Gold Radio, daily newspaper Shqip, Shqip Magazine, coffee producer Lori Caffe, VGA Studio, My Music Radio, and musicAL. In Europe, Digitalb will broadcast until the year 2026 on Eutelsat (Eutelsat 16A).

== Channels ==
Digitalb's channels include Top Channel, Top News, T, Max HD, Family HD, Gold HD (aka Digi Gold), Stinët, Explorer Shkencë, Explorer Histori, Explorer Natyra, Film Autor, Eurofilm, Film Hits, Film Thriller, Film Drame, Film Aksion, Film Komedi, SuperSport, Bang Bang, Çufo, and Junior.

== New developments ==
On February 14, 2013, DigitAlb launched a new model of set-top box, and also new services. Launching a middleware set-top box, DigitAlb started interactive services for its customers. VOD (video-on-demand), online betting, lotteries, games, IPTV, web navigation through the set-top box and many other options became available to customers. This was the most important new development since the launch of the HD service back in 2007.

== Decoders ==
=== Standard definition decoders ===
- Opentech ODS 3000C
- Opentech ODS 2000C (old SD decoder)

=== High definition decoderd ===
- Kaon KSF-S660HDCO
- Opentech ODS 3000H
- ODS 2000H (old HD decoder).

=== Terrestrial standard definition decoders ===
- Opentech ODT 1000C
- Kaon KTF-270CO (old terrestrial SD decoder)

=== Terrestrial high definition (T2) decoders ===
- ODT 2000H (premium HD terrestrial decoder)

=== Satellite HD Middleware decoders ===
- ODS 4000H (an HD middleware satellite decoder)
- FlyBOX (Decoder introduced in 2013 which included PVR, Internet, online apps, etc.)
- FlyBox mini (Limited edition)
- Hard Disk i DigitAlb (HDD, hard disk drive)

All DigitAlb decoders are Conax Conditional access Embedded.
