= Top Channel =

Albanian national television network

Top Channel Sh.A
- Type: National commercial network
- Country: Albania
- Network: DigitAlb
- Headquarters: Kashar, Tirana, Albania

Programming
- Language: Albanian
- Picture format: 576i (SDTV 16:9); 1080i (HDTV 16:9)
- Timeshift service: Available via DigitAlb

Ownership
- Owner: Top Media Group
- Key people: Lori Hoxha (CEO)
- Sister channels: Radio: Top Albania Radio 100.0 FM (Tirana), Top Gold Radio 100.8 FM (Tirana), My Music Radio 97.3 FM (Tirana); TV: Top News, MusicAL; Films: Top Channel Films

History
- Founded: 2000; 26 years ago (as a company); 30 July 2001; 25 years ago (experimental)
- Launched: 20 December 2001 (24 years ago)
- Founder: Dritan Hoxha

Links
- Website: top-channel.tv

Availability

Terrestrial
- Albania: DVB-T2 or Analogue, UHF CH59 (depends on region)

Streaming media
- DigitAlb OTT: Top Channel

Top Channel (often abbreviated as TCH) is a national commercial television network based in Tirana, Albania, founded by Dritan Hoxha in 2001. It is part of the Top Media Group, one of the largest media conglomerates in Albania, which includes Top Albania Radio, Top Gold Radio, My Music Radio, daily newspaper Shqip, daily magazine Shqip Magazine, coffee producer Lori Caffe, Digitalb, Top News, VGA Studio, musicAL, Dritan Hoxha Media Foundation Imperial Cinemas and Top Channel Films.

== History ==
In the 1990s, Dritan Hoxha was an entrepreneur and coffee importer from Laprakë, who went on to expand into the media business. He founded the enterprise Top Media Group in 1998, with his first venture being into radio: Top Albania Radio.

Top Channel was founded in 2000, and began early experimental broadcasts on 30 July 2001 from the International Centre for Culture (Qendra Ndërkombëtare e Kulturës), also known as the Pyramid of Tirana. It officially launched on 20 December 2001 and quickly became a generalist television channel.

In 2003, a national survey ranked Top Channel as the most-watched TV station in Albania with 50% of the audience share, up from 11.9% in 2002. Its rise in popularity was attributed to its high-quality broadcasting technology and its programming focused on current issues in Albanian society.

The channel began broadcasting in widescreen 16:9 high-definition format in 2009 and transitioned entirely to HD in 2012. Since September 2003, Top Channel has also been available via satellite across Europe through DigitAlb, and in North America via TVALB and Shqip TV. It is also accessible through IPTV platforms and local cable providers in countries such as Switzerland.

Top Channel has cooperated with international organizations including UNDP, UNICEF, IOM, OSCE, USAID, and the Red Cross, as well as private partners like Vodafone. It also maintains partnerships with international news agencies such as Reuters.

Top Channel, Top Albania Radio, and Top Gold Radio were founded by media entrepreneur Dritan Hoxha. After his death in a car accident in 2008, his wife Vjollca Hoxha assumed leadership of the company. Their daughter, Lori Hoxha, later became involved in the management of the group and was appointed CEO of Top Media in 2022.

On 18 March 2013, following an order from the Supreme Court of Albania, Top Channel was evicted from the Pyramid of Tirana, and its employees were ordered by State Police to immediately vacate the building. Although the lease for the premises were granted to them until 2025 by the Council of Ministers under the Berisha administration, the Supreme Court revoked their lease. Top Channel moved their headquarters to a building in Kashar, Tirana.

Nowadays, Top Channel has reduced airing international shows.

On 27 March 2023, a shooting occurred at the Top Channel headquarters in Tirana, resulting in the death of security guard Pal Kola. The shots were fired from a Range Rover using an AK-47 rifle. The vehicle was later found burned.

In 2025, the channel shifted focus away from films and series, replacing them with new original shows.

== Programmes ==
Program Overview
Program Name	Description	Key Hosts	Airing Period
News Bulletins & Reports	Daily news coverage on national and international events.	—	2001–present
E Diell	Weekly show with entertainment, interviews, and music.	Adi Krasta, Alban Dudushi, Xhemi Shehu, Edi Manushi	2008–present
Fiks Fare	Satirical show exposing corruption and social issues.	Julian Deda; Xhemi Shehu	Daily
Shqip	Political talk show with live interviews and analysis.	Rudina Xhunga	2002–2015
Ftesë në 5	Afternoon talk show with guests from various fields.	Bieta Sulo	2018–present
Portokalli	Comedy show with sketches, satire, and live acts.	Salsano Rapi; Kiara Tito; Nevina Shtylla	2003–present
Top Story	Political debate and investigative interviews.	Sokol Balla; Grida Duma	2006–2017, 2022–present
Top Show	Talk show covering culture, politics, and society.	Alban Dudushi	2003–2020
Top Fest	Music competition for Albanian-speaking artists.	—	2004–2015
Big Brother Albania	Reality show with contestants living in isolation.	Arbana Osmani, Ledion Liço	2008–present
StarTop	Business reality show with startup pitches.	Eno Popi	2022–2023
Wake Up	Morning show covering every day topics.	Blendi Salaj and Heidi Baçi	2025 - present
Shqipëria Live	Informative and entertainment television program that covers current events, human-interest stories, and social issues in Albania.	Sidorela Gjoni	2024 - present
Përputhen	Reality dating television program in which contestants meet and interact to form romantic connections and find a compatible partner.	Megi Pojani	2024 - present
Lufta e Nuseve	Reality television program in which three brides compete by hosting wedding events and rating each other in categories such as food, dress, atmosphere, and décor to win a prize.	Narrator: Eni Shehu Produced and directed by: Lorena Basha	2025 - present (Previously on TV Klan)

== See also ==
- Top Media Group
- DigitAlb
- Dritan Hoxha
