= List of television stations in Albania =

This is a list of television stations operating in Albania.

== National public channels ==
- RTSH 1 HD
- RTSH 2 HD
- RTSH 3 HD
- RTSH Plus
- RTSH Shqip
- RTSH 24
- RTSH Sport
- RTSH Muzikë
- RTSH Film
- RTSH Fëmijë
- RTSH Shkollë
- RTSH Agro
- RTSH Kuvend
- RTSH Gjirokastra
- RTSH Korça
- RTSH Shkodra
- RTSH Kukësi
- RTSH Satelit

== National private channels ==
- Top Channel
- TV Klan
- Vizion Plus
- Alsat
- Agon Channel
- TVA
- Albanian Screen

== Defunct channels ==
- +1Sport
- +2DOK
- +3Premiere
- +4Family
- +5Shqip
- +6Toon
- +7Music
- Channel One (Albania)

== Affiliated channels available abroad ==
- Klan Kosova - Kosovo
- Klan Macedonia - North Macedonia

== Regional channels ==
=== Tirana DVB-T2 ===
- IN TV HD
- BBF TV
- NTV
- RTV Ora
- Scan TV
- Syri TV
- Shijak Tv
- UTV News
- Kukës TV
- Club TV
- Euronews Albania
- A2 CNN

== Local channels ==
- TV Rozafa
- TV Kombi
- TV1 Channel
- Antena Nord TV (HD)
- Tv Kopliku
- TV Blue Sky
- Shipja Master Tv
- Elrodi TV
- Jug Tv
- Tv Apollon
- City TV
- Real RTV
- Super Sonic Tv
- Super Folk
- Star Plus HD
- Tema TV
- Folk+
- Alpo TV
- TV Skampa
- TV 6+1 Vlora
- Tv Lezha
- Tv Kontakt
- Zjarr Tv
- Alb'swissTV
- Best Channel
- TV Klaudiana

== Movies & series ==
- Klan Plus
- T HD
- Stinët
- DigitAlb 20 vjet HD
- Gold HD
- Max HD
- Eurofilm
- Film Autor HD
- Film Hits HD
- Film Thriller
- Film Dramë
- Film Aksion HD
- Film Komedi HD
- 3 Plus
- Jolly HD
- Tring Super HD
- Tring Action HD
- Tring Life
- Tring Comedy
- Tring Fantasy
- Tring Shqip
- Smile
- Kino Premiere 1 HD
- Kino Premiere 2 HD
- Kino Premiere 3 HD
- Kino Premiere 4 HD
- Kino Premiere 5 HD
- Kino Comedy HD
- Kino Sci Fi HD
- Kino Thriller HD
- Kino Family HD
- Kino Action HD
- Kino One HD
- Kino Romance HD
- Kino Dark HD
- Kino Arkiva HD
- Kino Drama HD
- Sky Hits
- Sky Max
- Sky Aksion
- Sky Drama
- Sky Komedi
- Sky Family
- Sky Shqip
- Sky Novela
- ALB Film
- ALB Humor
- HBO
- HBO3
- Star Channel
- Star Life
- Star Crime
- AMC

== Documentaries ==
- Explorer Shkencë
- Explorer Histori
- Explorer Natyra
- Tring Planet
- Tring World
- Tring History
- Sky Shkencë
- Sky Planet
- Sky Histori
- National Geographic HD
- Nat Geo Wild
- Travel Channel HD
- Discovery Channel HD
- Investigation Discovery
- TLC Discovery
- Animal Planet
- Outdoor Channel
- History Channel

== Children ==
- Bang Bang
- Çufo
- Junior TV
- Tring Tring
- Tip TV
- Tring Kids
- Bubble TV
- RTSH Fëmijë
- RTSH Shkollë
- ALB Kids
- Disney Channel
- Disney XD
- Nickelodeon
- Nick Jr.
- Cartoon Network
- Cartoonito
- Baby TV
- Duck TV

== Sport ==
- Klan Sport
- SuperSport 1 HD
- SuperSport 2 HD
- SuperSport 3 HD
- SuperSport 4 HD
- SuperSport 5 HD
- SuperSport 6 HD
- SuperSport 7 HD
- Tring Sport News HD
- Tring Sport 1 HD
- Tring Sport 2 HD
- Tring Sport 3 HD
- Tring Sport 4 HD
- TeleSport
- Eurosport HD on DigitAlb
- Eurosport 2 HD on DigitAlb
- Motors TV

== Music ==
- MTV Europe
- MTV Hits
- MTV Dance
- MTV 90s
- MTV Live HD
- MTV 00s
- MTV 80s
- My Music
- IN TV
- Supersonic TV
- BBF TV
- Folk Plus
- TV Blue Sky
- Tirana TV
- Club TV
- MusicAL
- Click TV
- STV Folk
- ALB Music HD
- ALB Hits HD
- ALB Koncert HD
- ALB Folk HD
- ALB Çifteli HD
- ALB Hip Hop HD
- Globe Music
- Real TV
- City TV
- 3+ HD

== News ==
- ABC News
- Top News
- Kanali 7
- RTV Ora
- News 24
- Ora News
- Panorama TV
- Report TV
- Syri TV
- CNA TV
- A2 News (CNN Exclusive News Channel Affiliate)
- Klan News
- Euronews Albania

== Others ==
- Living
- Muse
- Egnatia TV
- Shop TV
- BCTV
- Fashion TV
- Luxe.tv
- Planet TV
- Entertainment!
- Food Network
- 24Kitchen

== See also ==
- Television in Albania
- Lists of television channels
- List of European television stations
