= Të Paekspozuarit =

Albanian political talk show (since 2015)

- Also known as: Të Paekspozuarit nga Ylli Rakipi
- Genre: Talk show
- Created by: Ylli Rakipi
- Presented by: Ylli Rakipi
- Country of origin: Albania
- Original language: Albanian

Production
- Running time: Weekly

Original release
- Network: Ora News
- Release: 22 January 2015 – 2018
- Network: News 24
- Release: 1 January 2018 – 2020
- Network: Top Channel
- Release: 1 January 2020 – 2022
- Network: MCN TV
- Release: 1 January 2022 – present

Të Paekspozuarit (The Unexposed) is an Albanian political talk show hosted by journalist Ylli Rakipi. The program first aired on Ora News in January 2015 and currently airs on Vizion Plus. The show focuses on major political and social developments in Albania through interviews, debates, and investigative reports.

== History ==
The program debuted on Ora News in 2015, quickly gaining attention for its confrontational style of interviews with leading Albanian politicians. It later moved to News 24 , Top Channel, and MCN TV before joining Vizion Plus where it continues to air.

== Format ==
Each weekly episode typically features:

- In-depth interviews with key political figures, including Edi Rama, Sali Berisha, Lulzim Basha, and Arlind Qori.
- Panel discussions with analysts and commentators.
- Debates on political, economic, and social issues of the day.

The guest panel is usually composed of:

- Active and former politicians – providing insider perspectives.
- Political analysts – including Andi Bushati and Preç Zogaj.
- Investigative journalists and legal experts – addressing issues of justice and transparency.

== Notable guests ==
Over the years, Të Paekspozuarit has hosted some of Albania’s most influential political figures and commentators, including:

- Edi Rama
- Sali Berisha
- Agron Shehaj
- Lulzim Basha
- Arlind Qori
