= Tepelenë Internment Camp =

Albanian internment camp (1949–1954)

Coordinates: 40.2999°N 20.0156°E

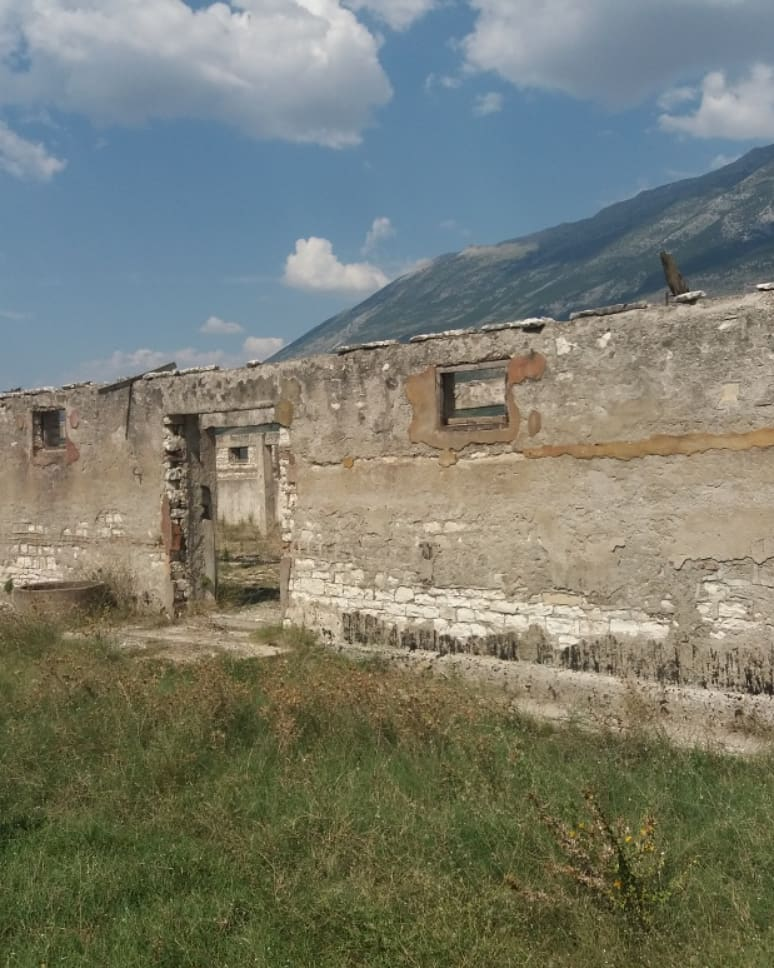
The camp in 2018

The Tepelenë Internment Camp or Tepelenë Camp was an internment camp in Tepelenë, Gjirokastër County, Albania, that was used by the People's Socialist Republic of Albania and modeled after the Soviet Union’s kolkhoz, in which convicts, fugitives, and deserters alike were imprisoned. A large number of children were also kept there, leading to high infant mortality. The camp was identified by two numbers, 4 and 6, and remained active from April 1949 to March 1954.

The Tepelenë Camp earned international infamy, including a United States government report submitted to the United Nations in February 1955.

Documentation, including the names of those interned, is scarce due to the poor-quality record-keeping of the time.

== History ==
=== Previous use ===
During the Italian occupation, several barracks were built at the foot of Ali Pasha Castle by the army for use during the Greco-Italian War.

=== Use as a camp ===
Initially, two camps were established: one in Berat for northerners and one in Krujë for southerners. These two operated until 1949, when several reorganizations took place. The Berat internees were moved to Tepelenë and Porto Palermo Castle. The barracks were repurposed to house internees deemed by the communist government to be reactionaries, kulaks, bourgeois, declassed traitors, and foreign agents.

In 1952, the nearly a thousand able-bodied prisoners were forced out to work in construction, mainly building Internal Affairs buildings and prisons. For a while, they were garrisoned in the Tirana brick factory. Southerners, once interned in Valias and Krujë, took the relocated prisoners’ place.

The camp was a 1:10,000 scale miniature of a Soviet gulag, keeping about 600 (including many families with small children) in a 25 metres (82 ft) by 14 metres (46 ft) space. When the first internments began in 1945, it was alleged that the Albanian communist government had decided to round up the deportees and send them to Siberia by ship.

The Tepelenë Camp was closed in 1954, after six years, when all the internees were resettled in the fields of Myzeqe (near Lushnjë) on November 29 Farm, which the internees’ labor had built. The camp was closed due to the need to consolidate prisons as well as the high mortality of children there.

=== Demographics ===
It is estimated that between 3,000 and 5,000 people were interned during the time the camp operated there. Estimates hold that about 600 internees died, half of them children up to the age of 5.

=== Staff ===
The camp had two commanders, Xhafer apo Bektash Pogaçe (1949–52) and Haki Ibrahimi (1952–54). According to the testimony of Vasil Kokali, interned there from December 1950 to May 1952, the camp was policed by 15 officers.

== Account by Lek Pervizi ==
An editorial from an issue of the magazine Kuq e Zi includes testimony from painter Lek Pervizi, a painter who survived the camp, to commemorate the 70th anniversary of its opening on August 23, 2018. His accounts are in the archives of the Interior Ministry.

The editorial includes drawings and poems by Pervizi himself describing life at Tepelenë. After several hand injuries, Pervizi was removed from the work list on the advice of a visiting doctor.

Meanwhile I had drawn life in the barracks, including the alcoves the internees stayed in and figures of men and women standing around there. In the absence of paper, I instructed some of the elders to keep those from the tobacco cans they bought or packagers supplying prisoners.

Only a few drawings managed to survive as evidence.

== American government report on forced labor ==
The camp was brought to the UN’s attention by a U.S. government report submitted in February 1955.

The report indicated forced labor had been widely used by the communist regime since it came to power in Albania in November 1944, under a series of laws promulgated to legalize it then. The new Albanian Penal Code, based on the Soviet Penal Code, contained elaborate provisions for “corrective” labor and deportation of citizens to labor camps, where even children as young as 12 were forced to work.

The original purpose of the camps was to deport the families of already apprehended political prisoners and relocate upper-class families expelled to allow the new regime’s acolytes to seize those families’ homes. Northerners were usually interned in the south, especially at Tepelenë, Fier, and Berat.

== Commemoration ==
August 23 was officially proclaimed the European Day of Remembrance for Victims of Stalinism and Nazism or Black Ribbon Day by the European Parliament in 2008. Every year since 2011, a different European state hosts a conference dedicated to the issue.

=== August 30, 2017 ===
On August 30, 2017, the AIDSSH (Authority for Information on Former State Security Documents), Institute for the Formerly Politically Persecuted, Institute for the Studies of Communist Crimes and Consequences in Albania, and the Municipality of Tepelenë held a joint memorial for the victims who were held there.

Survivors and their relatives planted cypress trees in the part of the camp known as Ward 84, in memory of the 300 children who lost to disease, hunger, and poor hygiene. This symbolic planting was christened the “Children’s Forest.” The director of AIDDSH said during the event that one of the barracks would be restored to its 1949–54 condition and a memorial built in the heart of the camp as the “Tomb of the Unknown Child.”

=== August 23, 2018 ===
President Ilir Meta participated in ceremonies honoring internees and victims at Tepelenë, joining AIDDSH and the local government. President Meta participated in a ceremony honoring Pervizi for his artistic testimony and three women who lost children there for their courage, the latter including Gjelë Gjikola, Mrikë Gjikola, and Drane Jakja.

Also that day, an exhibition entitled “Communist Perescution in the Tepelenë Region,” presenting archival documents of those who suffered there, was held at the Tepelenë Palace of Culture. Among the artifacts there were the pants of Gjon Vatnikaj, mended by his mother Mrika Tunxhi during their internment using her own hair. The exhibition was accompanied by a scientific symposium on the historical and legal framework of forced labor.

=== Memorials and museums ===
In 2018, the camp was selected by AIDDSH as a memorial for victims of the dictatorship, in partnership with the Municipality and some of the internees’ families. The resulting museum was designed by Gjon Radovani and had been presented in Tepelenë on August 30, 2017, with the help of the Municipality and the National Historical Museum. Envisioned as a center to commemorate and honor the victims of dictatorship in general, the complex was envisaged to include:

- Reconstruction of the internees’ sleeping quarters
- Rebuilding the officers’ and staff quarters
- Reconstruction of the infirmary
- Reuse of an existing building as a multimedia center and museum hall to display artifacts of the dictatorship
- Foundation of a study center
- Construction of auxiliary facilities such as the entrance, ticket office, gift shop, and restrooms
- Reconstruction of the barbed wire fence

On November 13 of that year, AIDSSH requested approval for this from the Ministry of Culture, and it was granted.

== Debate and public opinion ==
On March 28, 2018, in an interview with the Ora News TV show Arena, historian Prof. Dr. Pëllumb Xhufi claimed the camp’s conditions were good and that it was not a concentration camp in the traditional sense despite the deaths of men, women, and over 300 children. The statement sparked public controversy. Invited to News 24’s Studio e Hapur, he said his report was backed up by CIA documents and survivor testimony:

I quoted a detailed 1953 CIA report. So these are not my statements. People are claiming I claimed this camp had unusually good conditions for the period or was a holiday camp.

Xhufi was criticized by former detainees who grew up there, associations thereof and of advocates, and other historians. Historian Kastriot Dervishi highlighted in response Xhufi’s family ties to communist nomenklatura.

Historian Enriketa Pandelejmoni argued in response for the importance of oral recollection in the absence of archival documents.

== Film about the Camp ==
Journalist Luljeta Progni wrote and Gentian Kurti directed the movie Azizi vendos të rrëfejë (“Aziz Confesses”), based on one of the surviving detainees’ testimony.

== Famous internees ==
- Dine Dine
- Musa Sina
- Eugjen Merlika
- Kurt Kola
- Lek Pervizi
- Nikollë Dojanaj
- Seit Petrela
- Sokol Mirakaj
