= Ylli Rakipi =

Albanian journalist and television host (born 1959)

- Born: March 10, 1959 (age 67); Barmash (Kolonjë), Albania
- Education: University of Tirana
- Occupation: Journalist • television presenter • media executive
- Writing career
- Years active: 1992–present

Ylli Rakipi is an Albanian journalist, television host and online media owner, best known as the host of the political and investigative show "Të Paekspozuarit".

== Early life and education ==
Ylli Rakipi was born on 10 March 1959 in the village of Barmash, Kolonjë, Albania. He completed secondary education and later graduated in Language and Literature from the University of Tirana. In his early years, he contributed writings to publications such as Zëri i Rinisë and Drita.

== Career ==
=== Print journalism (1990s–2010s) ===
In 1993, Rakipi worked as editor-in-chief of the newspaper Republika, a position he held for three years. In 1995, he founded and directed the newspaper Albania, which he led for 15 years.

=== Television career ===
In 2014, Rakipi was appointed General Director of Ora News.

On 22 January 2015, he began hosting the political and investigative talk show Të Paekspozuarit ("The Unexposed").

The program initially aired on Ora News, later moving to News 24, Top Channel, MCN TV and subsequently transitioned to Vizion Plus in October 2026.

== See also ==
- Të Paekspozuarit
