= TV Arbëria =

Albanian television channel

- Country: Albania
- Headquarters: Tirana

Programming
- Language: Albanian

Ownership
- Owner: TV Arbëria sh.a.

History
- Launched: 1996
- Founder: Ardian Takaj; Roke Koro; Perikli Karavella
- Closed: 2009; 17 years ago
- Former names: TVA

TV Arbëria (also known as TVA) was a private Albanian television channel, based in Tirana. Founded in 1996, it was among the first private television broadcasters established in the country after the fall of communism and the liberalization of the Albanian media market.

== History ==
TV Arbëria emerged during a period when Albania was transitioning from a state-controlled broadcasting system dominated by RTSH to a more pluralistic media environment. Throughout the 1990s and early 2000s, the channel gained popularity with urban audiences in Tirana and other parts of the country, despite having limited analog coverage.

It originally operated under the name Tele Arbëria and later rebranded as TVA. Its name references a medieval ethnonym used among the Arbëreshë communities of southern Italy who refer to their Albanian homeland in such term.

One of the channel’s best-known programs was the talk show Zonë e Lirë, hosted by Arian Çani. It debuted in 2003 before later moving to other Albanian television networks.

During the 2000s, the station experienced financial difficulties, including frequent staffing changes. Although TVA attempted to modernize its programming and expand its audience, it gradually lost market share amid increasing competition from larger national channels such as TV Klan and Top Channel.

TV Arbëria ceased operations in 2009 after declaring bankruptcy. Its broadcasting frequencies were later acquired by TV Klan. Prior to its closure, the station was also available on the DigitAlb satellite platform.
