= Squatting in Albania =

Occupation of unused buildings

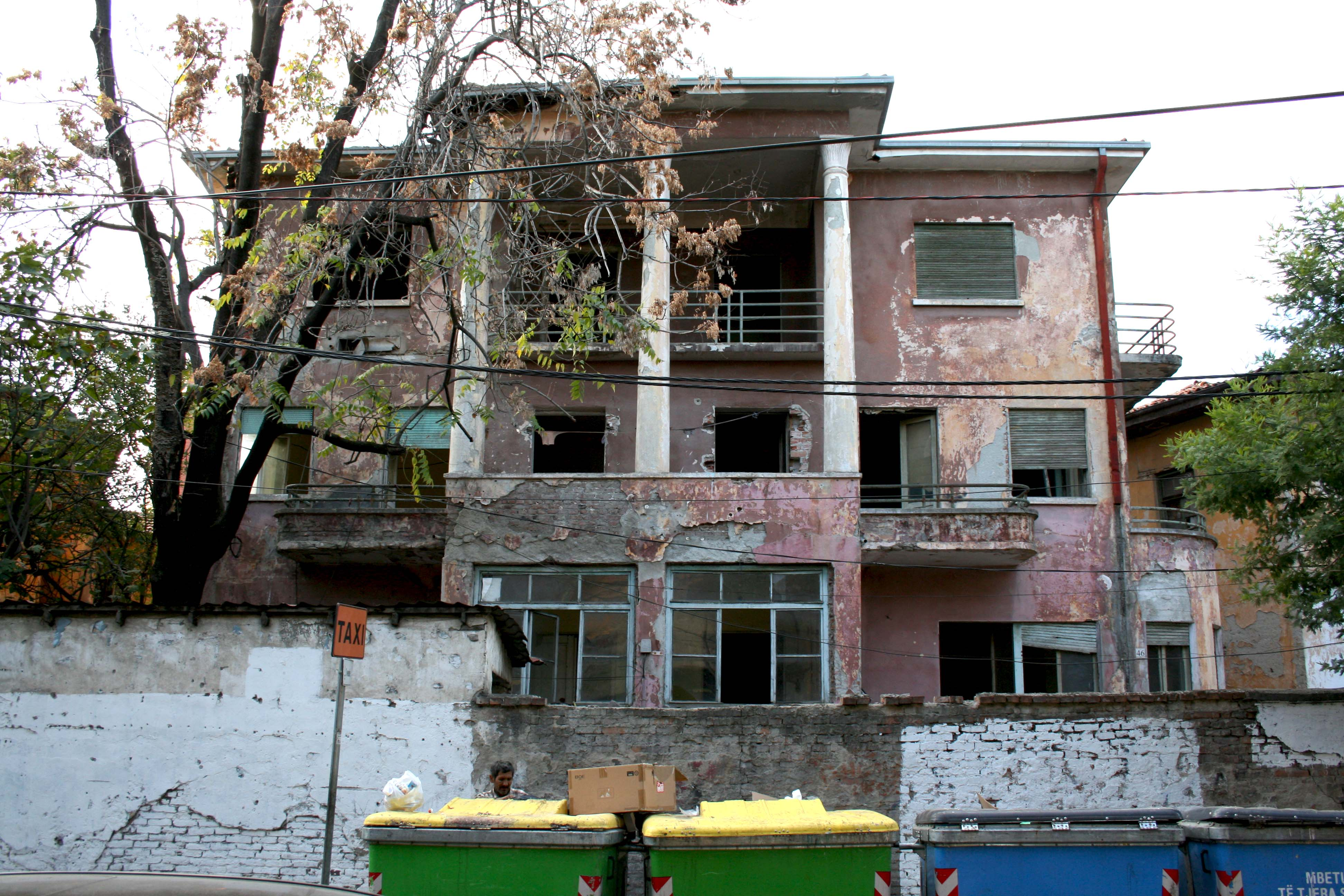
Squatted building in Tirana, 2018

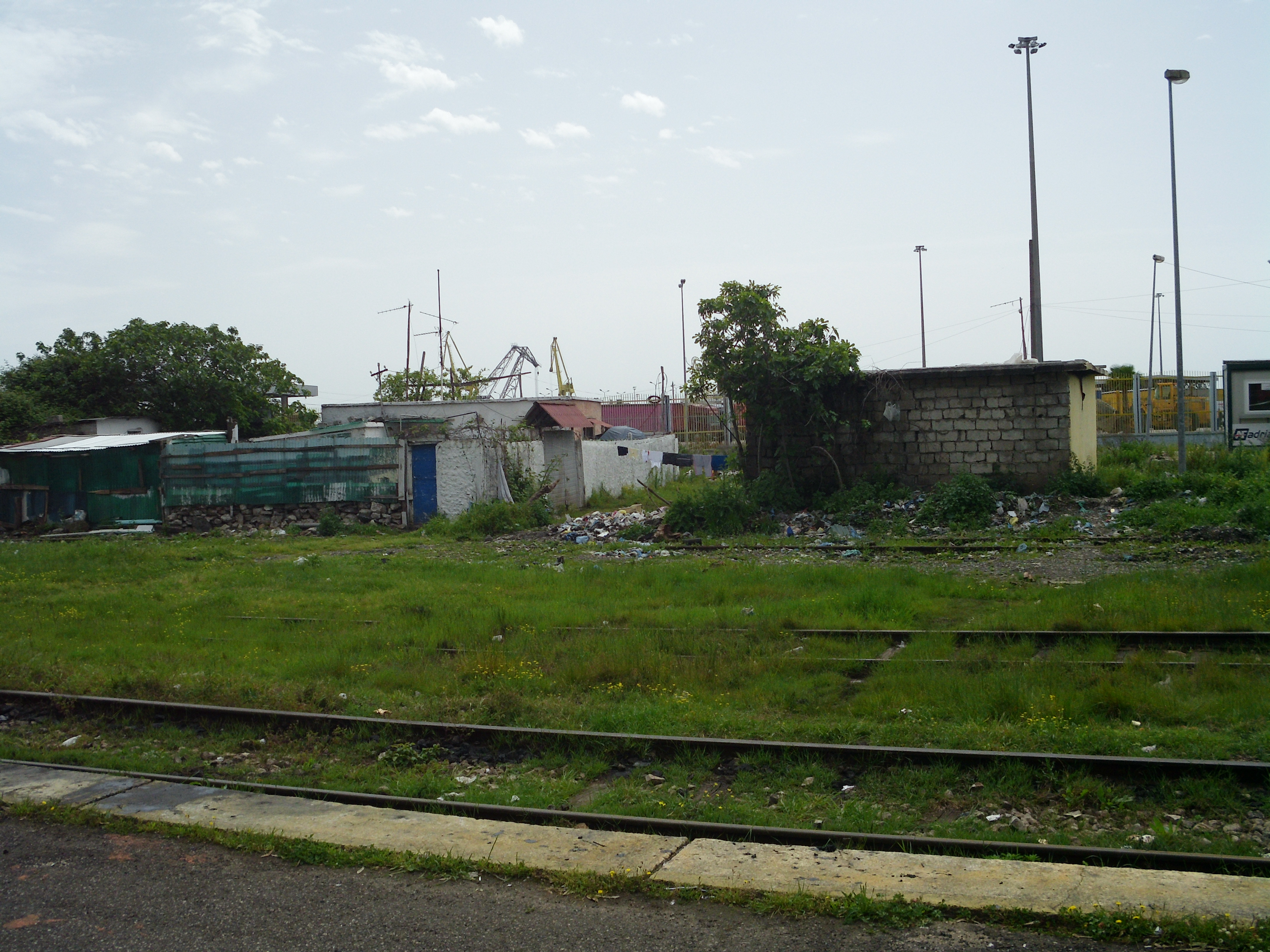
An informal settlement at Durrës train station

Squatting in Albania began on a large scale in the 1990s after the fall of communism, with internal migration towards formerly collectivised farmland establishing informal settlements. One such area, Bathore on the periphery of the capital Tirana, had 40,000 squatters by the early 2000s who successfully campaigned for better amenities. Other squatters occupied severely polluted post-industrial sites. The Agency of Legalization, Upgrading, and Integration of Informal Zones and Buildings (ALUIZNI) had legalized 16,500 homes on 152 settlements by 2009. As of 2020, 25 per cent of the population of Albania's cities lived in informal settlements.

== History ==
In pre-Communist Albania, respect for private property was enforced and squatting was not tolerated. Upon the foundation of the People's Socialist Republic of Albania, Enver Hoxha (who was leader of the country from 1945 until his death in 1985), outlawed private land titles. After the dissolution of the Soviet Union and the fall of communism in Albania, the Republic of Albania was formed in 1991. The country was in a poor state and public order broke down. A third of all schools were severely damaged and health centres were also attacked, with 65 per cent either being destroyed or squatted. The headquarters of the SHIK (the internal intelligence agency) were occupied in Peshkopi. There was a high degree of corruption in the distribution of land and there were cases of squatter households being offered land for free in exchange for sending young family members abroad as sex workers. Catholic organisations bought up land specifically to house Catholic squatters and refugees from the breakup of Yugoslavia also squatted in Albania throughout the 1990s.

From 1990 onwards, mountain dwellers had been sending family members to squat land and grow wheat on formerly collectivised farms in the plains near Durrës, Lezhë and the capital Tirana. Other occupations occurred in Gjirokastër, Korçë, Shkodër and Vlorë. By the 2000s, there were 127 informal settlements nationwide with most people living on the periphery of Tirana; government officials could take years to contact the squatters and at that point they could be bribed. There was also internal migration from the poor northern regions to Tirana; between 1989 and 2010, its population increased from 300,000 to 650,000. The largest new settlement was on former agricultural land at Bathore, just to the north of Tirana, where the squatters built spacious multi-storey houses. The former state farm at Kamza next to the Agricultural University of Tirana was broken up and given to workers, with land at Kamza Hill also being occupied illegally.

In April 1995, the government announced that the Bathore squatters would be evicted. In response, the squatters took the deputy prime minister Tritan Shehu hostage and the government was forced to back down, later claiming Bathore was a model settlement and promising to legalize it; President of the World Bank James Wolfensohn later visited the site. By April 2003, the 40,000 squatters were tired of the unmet promises and told the government that if progress was not made by 21 April they would start an insurrection. There was no response, so on 24 April they blocked the main road and marched on Tirana; the government then pledged to meet all the demands of the squatters regarding better amenities except the one requesting a hospital. Squatters from other areas such as the 22,000 inhabitants of Kënet also protested and by 2012, Bathore had paved roads and a public transport link to Tirana.

Elsewhere, other squatters were evicted. For example in 1995 soon after the settlers of Bathore fought off eviction, 170 squatters on the Lezhë plain were evicted. The following year, the Albanian Police battled hundreds of squatters when it enforced an eviction order in the northern suburbs of Tirana.

Squatters have sometimes occupied severely polluted sites, such as a derelict factory in Vlorë or the former chemical plant at Porto Romano in Durrës. As of 2002, around 6,000 people were living on the latter contaminated site. Chemicals such as chlorobenzene, chromium 6 and lindane were present at dangerously high levels yet the squatters distrusted officials who warned them and the state had no budget to secure the site. The World Heritage Site Butrint National Park has been looted in periods of instability, so squatters there have been tolerated as guardians against theft and poaching.

== Recent events ==
During the 2005 parliamentary elections, the Democratic Party proposed legalizing the squatter settlements, following the ideas of Hernando De Soto. Once in power, it gave land titles to squatters, compensated pre-Communist owners of squatted land and upgraded settlements. The Agency of Legalization, Upgrading, and Integration of Informal Zones and Buildings (ALUIZNI) was founded in 2006 and three years later it had legalized 16,500 homes on 152 settlements. It had also identified 10,000 homes that were existing in unpermitted areas and had evicted homes that were blocking the construction of public infrastructure. The director of ALUIZNI estimated there were 400,000 illegally constructed buildings nationwide. As of 2020, 25 per cent of the population of Albania's cities lived in informal settlements.

== See also ==
- History of Post-Communist Albania
- Squatting in Romania
