= Albanian Soil Research Institute =

The Albanian Soil Research Institute (Albanian: Instituti i Kërkimit të Tokave) was a scientific research institute on soil research that was created in 1971 and discontinued in 2006.

== History ==
The Soil Research Institute was created in Tirana, Albania in 1971, as a continuation of a pre-existing institute of soil research then based in Kamëz. Its goal was the pedologic study on agricultural and non agricultural land, as well as topographic measurement on land in Albania. In 1996 the Institute of Study and Projection of Irrigation and Drainage Projects, which had been created in 1945, merged into the Soil Research Institute.

In 2006 the institute was dissolved by law (government decree Nr. 515, as of 19 July 2006) as a nationwide reorganization occurred, following which new scientific institutions (called Transfer Centers of Agricultural Technology (Albanian: Qendra e Transferimit të Teknologjive Bujqësore)) were created.
