= Blendi Fevziu =

Albanian journalist, writer and talk show host (born 1969)

- Born: 18 May 1969 (age 57); Tirana, Albania
- Education: University of Tirana
- Occupations: Journalist, writer, host
- Writing career
- Years active: 1992–present

Blendi Fevziu (born 18 May 1969) is an Albanian journalist, writer and host of the television talk show Opinion, which first went on air on August 31, 1997.

== Early life and education ==
Fevziu was born in Tirana, Albania. He graduated in literature and Albanian language at the University of Tirana in 1991.

In 1989, he was part of the staff of the newspaper Studenti. Between December 1990 and February 1991, he participated in the student movement during the change of regime in Albania. On January 5, 1991, he was a co-founder of the newspaper Rilindja Demokratike (Democratic Rebirth).

== Career ==
=== Print media ===
- Chief editor of Koha Jonë (1992)
- Chief editor of Aleanca (1993–1996)
- Co-chief editor of Poli i Qendrës (1996)
- Political news editor for Independent (1997)
- Editor of Klan Magazine (1996–2001)
- Editor of Korrieri (2001–2005)
- Editor of Koha Jonë (2007–2008)

=== Television ===
In August 1997, Fevziu started a political show on TVSH named E Diela Debat. On September 26, 1998, the show moved to Klan Television and, from 1999, the broadcast day changed from Sundays to Thursdays.

In 2001, the program was renamed Opinion. From October 2006, it was broadcast twice a week, and since 2008, it has aired four times a week.

=== Sports administration ===
In February 2026, Fevziu was elected as a member of the Executive Committee of the Albanian Football Association (FSHF) for a four-year term.

== Works ==
| Year | Title | Translated | Co-Authors | References |
|---|---|---|---|---|
| 1992 | Njëqind ushtarë | One hundred soldiers | Ben Blushi | |
| 1994 | Piedestale pa Statuja | Pedestals without Statues | | |
| 1996 | Gjysma tjetër e botës | The other half of the world | | |
| 1999 | Para dhe pas kamerave | In front of and behind the cameras | | |
| 2004 | 50 + 1 | 50 + 1 | | |
| 2005 | Histori e Shtypit Shqiptar, 1848 - 2005 | History of the Albanian press, 1848–2005 | | |
| 2010 | Jeta ime - Intervistë me Blendi Fevziun | My life – Interview with Blendi Fevziu | | |
| 2010 | Hiri i Vullkanit | Volcanic Ashes | | |
| 2011 | "Piedestale pa Statuja" (Ribotim i plotësuar) | "Pedestals Without Statues" (Complete Reprint) | | |
| 2011 | "Enver Hoxha" biografi | Biography "Enver Hoxha" | | |
| 2012 | "100 Vjet" - një ekskursion në politikën shqiptare 1912 - 2012 | "100 Years" - an excursion into Albanian politics 1912 to 2012 | | |
| 2014 | Ahmet Zogu, Presidenti që u bë Mbret | Ahmet Zogu, the President who became King | | |
| 2016 | Pushteti | Power | | |
| 2019 | Tirana e Nonës | Mother's Tirana | | |
| 2020 | Lufta e Kosovës dhe Hashim Thaçi | War of Kosovo and Hashim Thaçi | Baton Haxhiu | |
| 2023 | Takimet e mia me... | My meetings with... | | |

Fevziu's biography of Hoxha was published in English, with an introduction by Robert Elsie, as Enver Hoxha: The Iron Fist of Albania by I. B. Tauris in 2016.
