= Fushë e Kërçikëve =

- Village
- Location within Albania
- Coordinates: 41°22′0″N 19°50′40″E
- Country: Albania
- County: Tirana
- Municipality: Kamëz
- Administrative unit: Paskuqan
- Time zone: UTC+1 (CET)
  - Summer (DST): UTC+2 (CEST)

Fushë e Kërçikëve is a village in the former municipality of Paskuqan in Tirana County, Albania. At the 2015 local government reform it became part of the municipality Kamëz. The etymology of Fushë e Kërçikëve from the Albanian language translates to in English as “Field of Kërçikëve” referring to being a field of this area.
