= Kodër Babrru =

- Village
- Location within Albania
- Coordinates: 41°21′30″N 19°50′40″E
- Country: Albania
- County: Tirana
- Municipality: Kamëz
- Administrative unit: Paskuqan
- Time zone: UTC+1 (CET)
  - Summer (DST): UTC+2 (CEST)

Kodër Babrru is a village in the former municipality of Paskuqan in Tirana County, Albania. At the 2015 local government reform it became part of the municipality Kamëz.
