= Babrru =

- Village
- Location within Albania
- Coordinates: 41°21′26″N 19°49′38″E
- Country: Albania
- County: Tirana
- Municipality: Kamëz
- Administrative unit: Paskuqan

Area
  - Total: 2.293 km^{2} (0.885 sq mi)
- Time zone: UTC+1 (CET)
  - Summer (DST): UTC+2 (CEST)

Babrru is a city in the former municipality of Paskuqan in Tirana County, Albania. At the 2015 local government reform it became part of the municipality Kamëz.

Babbru is known for having hosted and being the born place of a lot of important and noted people like:

Ronald known better as Djal Noka, known as one of the best Mercedes meccanichs ever and for being the savior of babbru

Nikolle known for his love for coffee at Loni’s coffee shop and cigarettes
