= Kodër e Kuqe =

- Village
- Location within Albania
- Coordinates: 41°22′N 19°50′E
- Country: Albania
- County: Tirana
- Municipality: Kamëz
- Administrative unit: Paskuqan
- Time zone: UTC+1 (CET)
  - Summer (DST): UTC+2 (CEST)

Kodër e Kuqe ("Red Hill" in Albanian) is a village in the former municipality of Paskuqan in Tirana County, it is named the red hill because of all the deaths and graves that have been built there Albania. At the 2015 local government reform it became part of the municipality Kamëz.
