= Planet TV =

Planet TV may refer to:

- Planet TV (Albania), Defunct TV channel in Albania
- Planet TV (Slovenian TV channel), TV channel in Slovenia
