= Neser =

Neser may refer to:

== People ==
- Jakob Neser (1883–1965), German wrestler
- Michael Neser (born 1990), Australian cricket player
- Vivian Neser (1894–1956), South African cricket player and lawyer

== Other ==
- Nesër TV, Albanian TV channel
- Neser (album) - An album by Czech music group Dymytry
