= Bathore Sports Hall =

Basketball arena in Tirana, Albania

Salla Sportive Bathore
- Palestra Bathore
- Location: Bathore, Tirana, Albania
- Owner: Kamëz Municipality
- Capacity: 500
- Record attendance: 452
- Field size: 115 m × 100 m (377 ft × 328 ft)

Construction
- Groundbreaking: 2012
- Built: March 2013

Tenant
- Kamza Basket

Salla Sportive Bathore is a purpose-built basketball arena built in 2013 in Bathore, Tirana, Albania. It is the home of Kamza Basket and is owned by the Kamëz Municipality.

== History ==
The first game at the arena was held on 22 March 2013 between Kamza Basket and Teuta Durrës, where tickets were free in order to sell out all 400 seats.
