= Opinion (Albanian TV program) =

Albanian talk show (since 1997)

- Also known as: Opinion TV Klan
- E Diela Debat
- Created by: Blendi Fevziu
- Directed by: Indrit Kasmi
- Presented by: Blendi Fevziu
- Country of origin: Albania
- Original language: Albanian

Original release
- Network: RTSH
- Release: 31 August 1997 – 1998
- Network: TV Klan
- Release: 26 September 1998 – present

Opinion is an Albanian talk show focused on politics and current events, broadcast on TV Klan and hosted by journalist Blendi Fevziu. It is considered the first televised political debate program in Albania.

== History ==
The program premiered on 31 August 1997 under the title E Diela Debat ("Sunday Debate") and was originally broadcast on RTSH. On 26 September 1998, it moved to TV Klan, where it has continued airing.

The first political debate hosted on the show brought together the two main political leaders of the time, Sali Berisha and Fatos Nano.

Over its broadcast history, Opinion has produced more than 2,500 hours of live programming and over 3000 episodes within its first 14 years, featuring approximately 8000 guests. The program is regarded as one of the most influential and long-running talk shows in Albania.

== Format ==
Since the 2008–09 television season, the program has aired four nights a week: Monday, Tuesday, and Wednesday at 22:00, and the traditional Thursday evening edition at 21:00. This structure has continued in subsequent seasons.

Each episode typically features debates, analysis, commentary, interviews, and testimonies, with guests drawn from politics, society, and public life. The show frequently discusses current political and social developments in Albania.

Notable political figures who have appeared as guests include Edi Rama, Ilir Meta, Sali Berisha, Fatos Nano, Erion Veliaj Lulzim Basha, and many other key actors in Albanian political life. Beyond politics, Opinion has also hosted personalities from the fields of art and literature such as Ismail Kadare and Dritëro Agolli, as well as representatives of Albanian sports, including members of the national football team.

== See also ==
- Blendi Fevziu
