= Bulçesh, Kamëz =

Bulçesh
- Village
- Location within Albania
- Coordinates: 41°22′30″N 19°47′50″E
- Country: Albania
- County: Tirana
- Municipality: Kamëz
- Administrative unit: Kamëz
- Time zone: UTC+1 (CET)
  - Summer (DST): UTC+2 (CEST)

Bulçesh is a village in the Tirana County, Albania. It is part of the municipality Kamëz.
