= Squatting in Romania =

Romania on globe in red

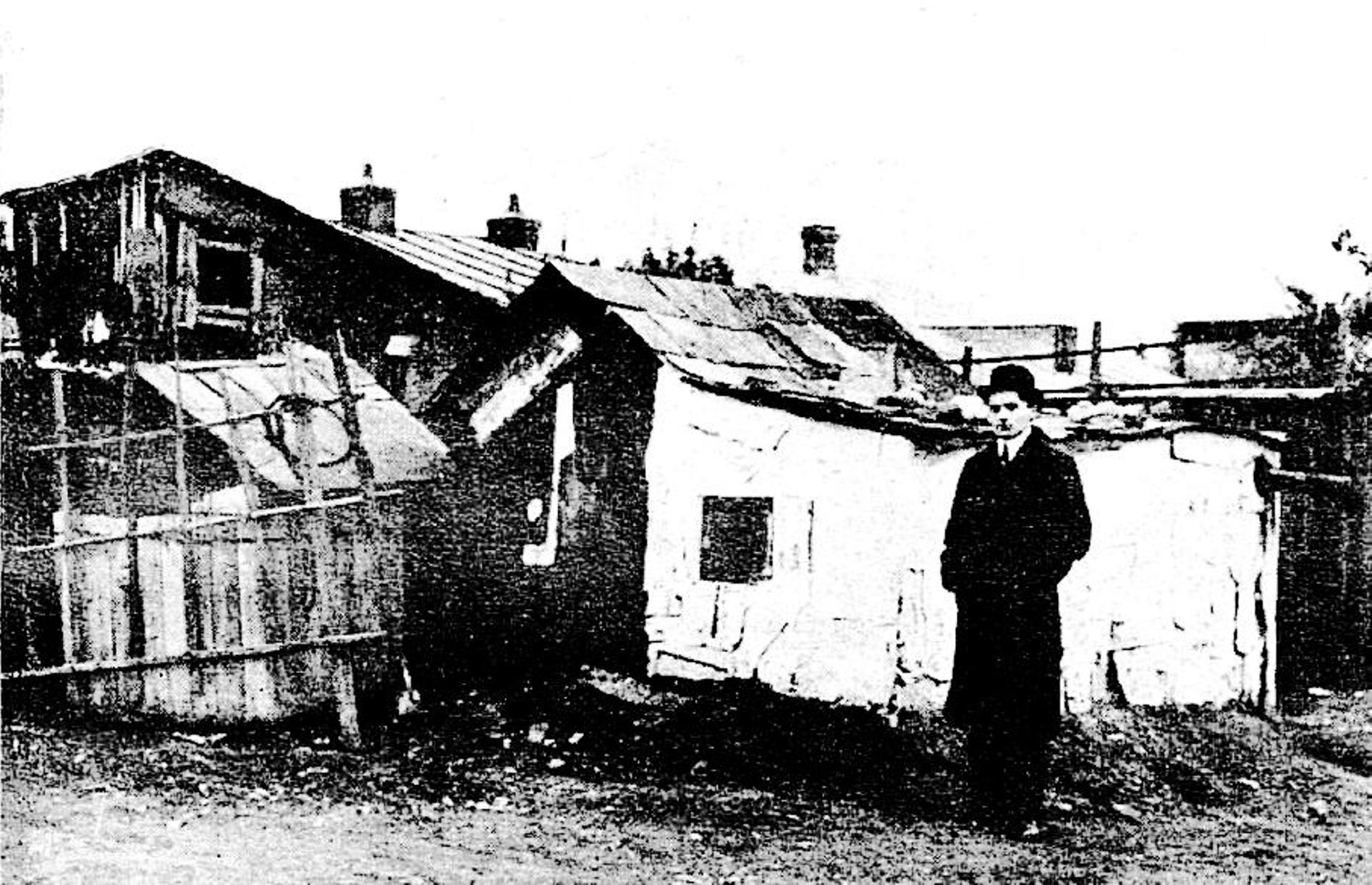
Slum housing in Bucharest, 1910

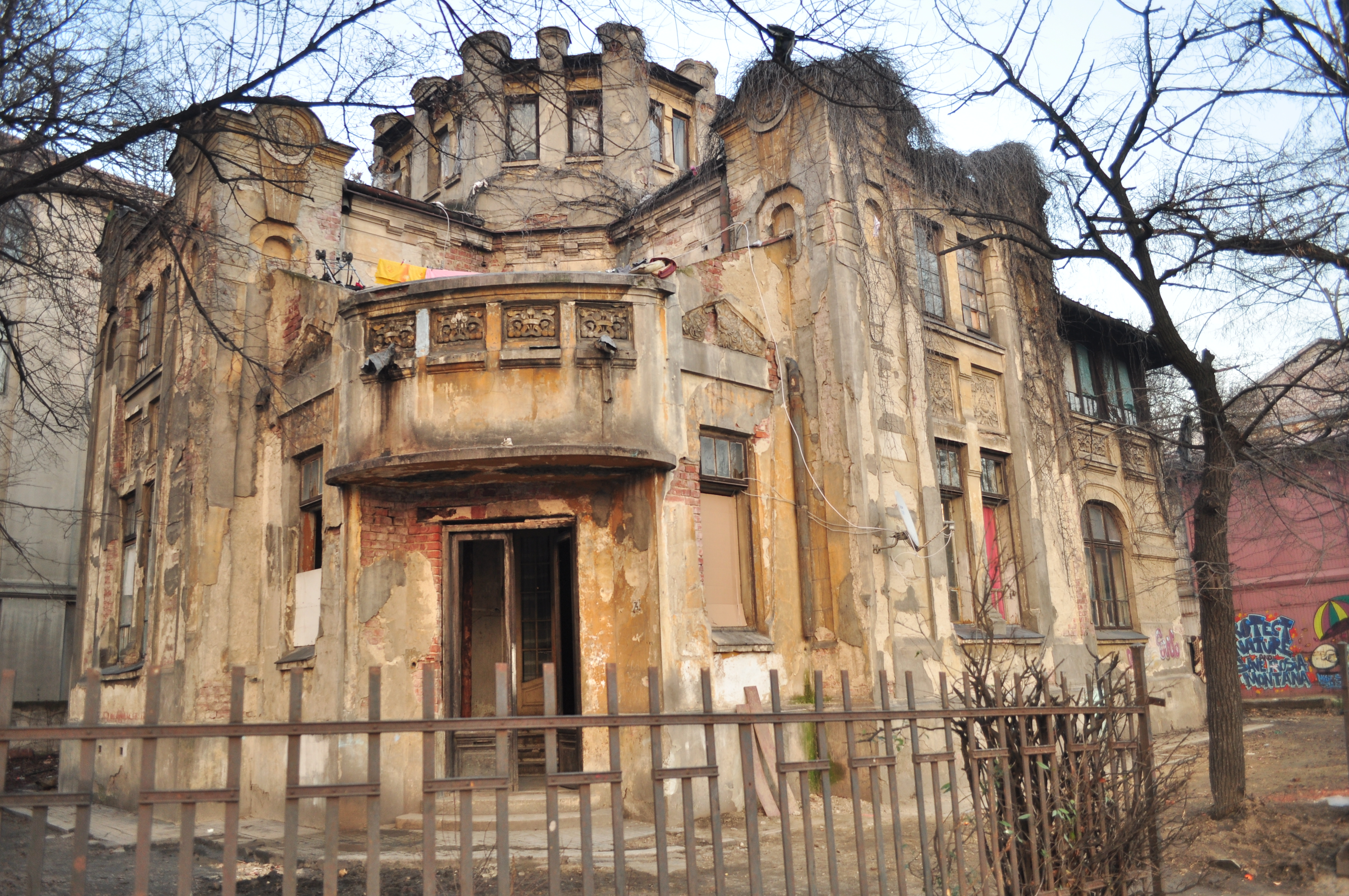
House built for Pompiliu Eliade, which fell derelict and was squatted

Squatting in Romania began in the capital Bucharest in the eighteenth century. After the Romanian Revolution in 1989, laws were abolished and the state had no land management policy. Problems with the state provision of housing have pushed people into squatting in areas such as Ferentari. The first public squat in Romania was Carol 53, occupied in 2012.

== History ==
The English term "squatting" is used as a loanword in the Romanian language, as are the descriptions locuire ilegală (illegal housing), ocupare abuzivă (abusive occupation) and ocupare fără documente (occupation without documents). Squatters describe themselves as locuitori fără documente (dwellers without documents). Squatting in the capital Bucharest began in the eighteenth century as the city grew. Informal settlements on the periphery were often created on church land and then formalized. This continued until the period between the two world wars, when a 1923 constitution enacted expropriation by the state and in 1927 factory owners were mandated to construct housing for employees. After World War II, the Socialist Republic of Romania's housing stock was devastated, with 45 per cent of all buildings damaged. Under state communism, land was nationalised in 1948 and dwellings two years later.

== Recent ==
After the Romanian Revolution in 1989, laws were abolished and the state had no land management policy. People occupied buildings and in some cases have remained in them, especially in cases of buildings scheduled to be demolished and then never destroyed. In Bucharest however, Mayor Adriean Videanu evicted between 2,000 and 3,000 people in a process of cleaning up the city centre for business and tourism.

Problems with the state provision of housing have pushed people into squatting in areas such as Ferentari. As of 2015, there were over a thousand informal settlements across the country. The first public squat in Romania was Carol 53 in Bucharest, occupied in 2012 by artists. This was a controversial project because in running the project the artists evicted a Roma family which was already silently squatting there.

== See also ==
- Romanian property bubble
- Squatting in Albania
- Squatting in Croatia
- Squatting in Ukraine
