= Squatting in Ukraine =

Occupation of unused land or derelict buildings in Ukraine

Squatting (Ukrainian: сквот, romanized: skvot) is the occupation of unused or derelict buildings or land without the permission of the owner. From the 17th century onwards, there have been waves of squatting in Ukraine. In the 21st century, squatting has been practiced by different groups such as artists, anarchists, Ukrainian nationalists, displaced Crimean Tatars returning to the region and refugees created by the annexation of Crimea by the Russian Federation.

== History ==
Ukraine has experienced waves of squatting. From the 17th century onwards, squatters claimed land on the steppe in what was then Muscovy and were legalized by the authorities in Moscow. Peasants were then given land and expanded what they owned through squatting. In the 18th century, squatters settled land along the banks of the Inhulets and Tiasmyn rivers. In addition, Russian traditionalist historians have refused to acknowledge Ukraine as a state and regard all Ukrainians as "squatters" on Russian lands.

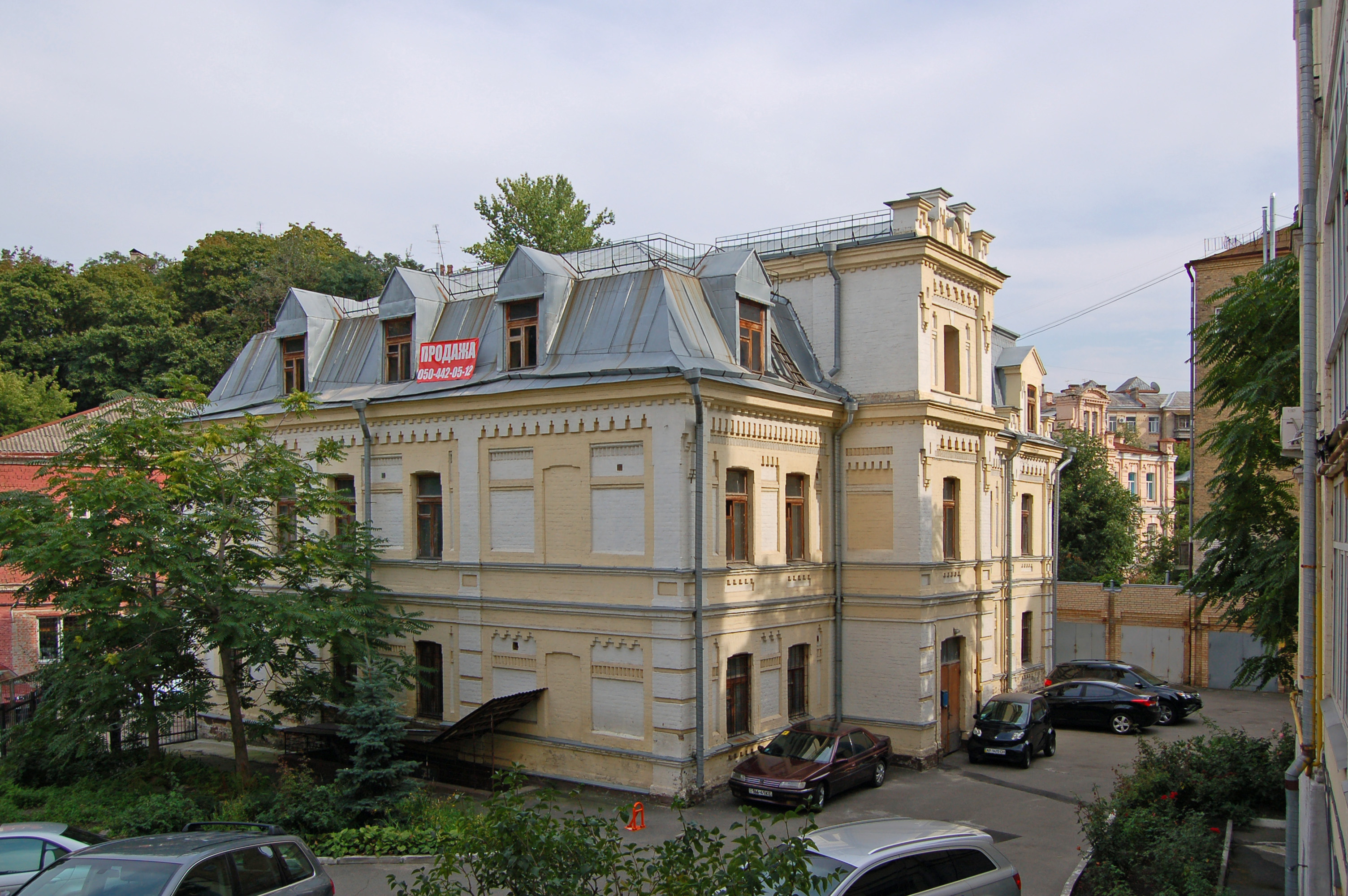
Mykhailivska Street 18A in Kyiv, a squat from 1990 until 1994, photographed in 2012.

At the beginning of World War II, refugees came to Ukraine from Poland and squatted in cities such as Lviv. Following the end of the Cold War and the collapse of the USSR, people made informal shelters along the Dnieper, for example on the edge of Kremenchuk. The shacks often had telephone numbers written on a sign, to indicate ownership. Between 1990 and 1994, there was the Parkomuna art squat in Kyiv, at Mykhailivska Street 18A (previously known as Paris Commune street). Artists associated with the space include Arsen Savadov. A book was published to accompany an exhibition about the project in 2019. From 2005 onwards, there was the SOSka art squat in Kharkiv.

== Crimean Tatars ==
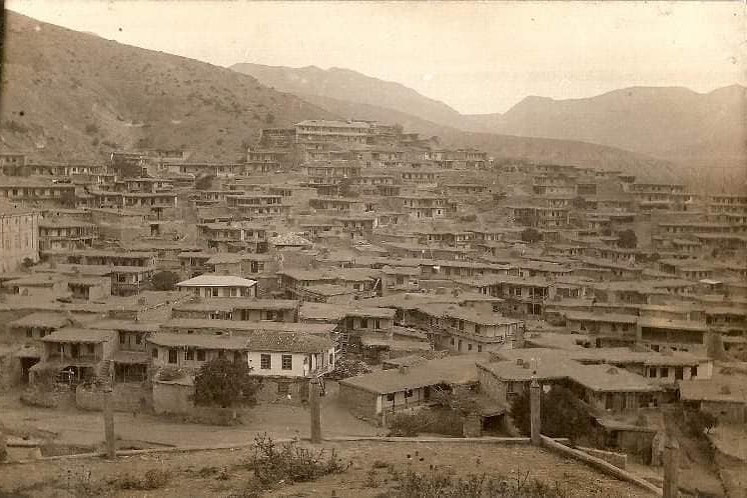
The village of Uskut after the deportation of its inhabitants in 1945

Crimean Tatars were deported from their homes as part of the Stalinist program of population transfer in the Soviet Union in the 1940s. When they returned, they found their properties lived in by others and thus began a movement of self-settlement (Ukrainian: Самозахват, romanized: Samozakhvat) in which they squatted land and hoped to stay long enough to gain legal tenure. Around 1,000 occupations occurred in southern Crimea between 1990 and 1995, of which 270 were permitted by the local authorities (and of these 147 proved to be uninhabitable).

The Soviet-era Criminal Code of Ukraine, enacted in 1961, did not legislate against squatters since the phenomenon was not widespread. After the protests of the returning Crimean Tatars, a new legal code was introduced in 2003 (retroactive to 2001) on the appeal of the Crimean Parliament. Following the change in the law, squatting in Crimea became punishable by fines, two years of hard labour and imprisonment. In addition, the use of dogs, chemicals and weapons was mandated to evict squats. Matters then came to a head in Simeiz in 2004, when Tatars occupied land owned by a politician and he reacted by summoning Cossack mercenaries. The Cossacks demolished the informal settlement and a number of squatters were fined and imprisoned. The following year, another conflict occurred in Koktebel when 2,000 soldiers were mobilized, but the squatters were not evicted.

Protests continued in 2009, when Daniyal Ametov led a demonstration of 2,000 Tatars outside the Council of Ministers of Crimea. After the 2014 annexation of Crimea by the Russian Federation, around 10,000 Tatars were forced to flee the area by the new government.

== Recent events ==
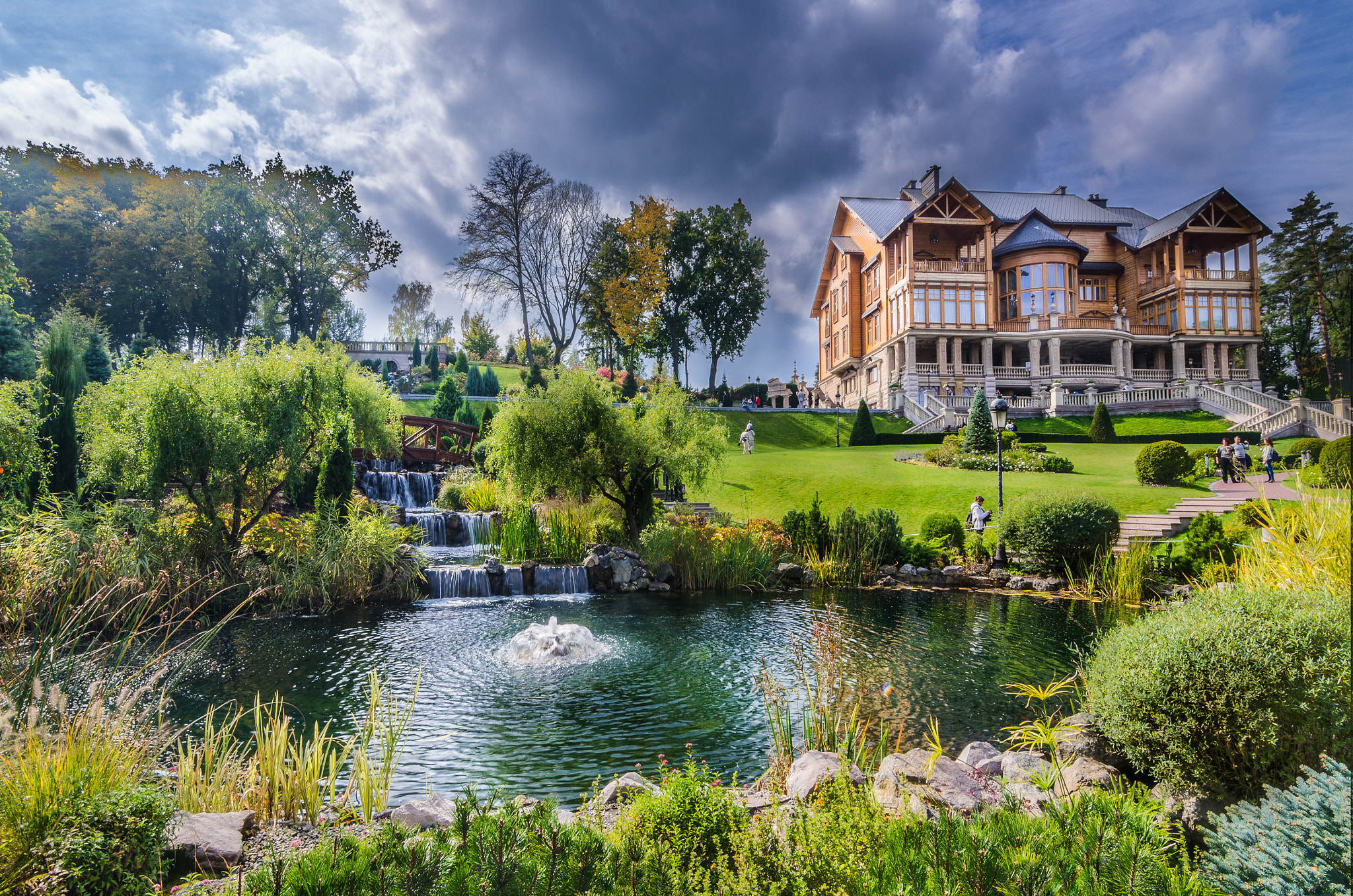
The Honka clubhouse at the Mezhyhirya Residence

Following the Euromaidan protests in 2013, the government was concerned by armed militants who continued to squat in buildings near Maidan Nezalezhnosti, the central square of Kyiv, the capital city of Ukraine. The Revolution of Dignity followed, in which the president, Viktor Yanukovych, fled and the government was toppled. The opulent Honka clubhouse at Yanukovych's Mezhyhirya Residence was occupied by activists wanting to preserve it for the people of Ukraine. It is owned by Tantalit, a company connected to Yanukovych which has had its assets frozen, and as of 2020 was still squatted. During the war in Donbas, people displaced by conflict from places such as Pisky squatted in neighbouring villages such as Pervomaysk.

During the Euromaidan, a squat was used as the headquarters of the Azov Battalion. Autonomia was an anarchist self-managed social centre established in Kharkiv in 2014. It provided aid to refugees from the Donbas and the Crimea and organised cultural events such as poetry readings, concerts and exhibitions. It was supported by artists such as Hito Steyerl, Serhiy Zhadan and Petr Pavlensky, but the people were evicted and the building was demolished in 2018. Economic instability caused by war led to dozens of squats in Kyiv. One well-known project is the Squat 17b cultural space.

== See also ==
- Squatting in Romania
