= Arian Çani =

Albanian journalist and television presenter (born 1968)

- Born: May 4, 1968 (age 58); Gjirokastër, PR Albania
- Occupations: Journalist; television presenter
- Years active: early 2000s–present
- Notable work: Zonë e Lirë
- Spouse: Enida Petro
- Children: 2

Arian Çani (born May 4, 1968) is an Albanian journalist and television presenter. He is known for hosting the political talk show Zonë e Lirë on several Albanian television channels, including TV Klan, Vizion Plus, and ABC News Albania.

== Early life ==
Çani was born in Gjirokastër, Albania. He spent part of his early childhood living with his maternal grandparents in a Greek-speaking environment and only learned Albanian later. He also revealed that he lived for some time in a children's home (orphanage) in Shkodër.

== Career ==
Çani began his career as a television presenter and journalist in the early 2000s. He is best known as the creator and host of the political talk show Zonë e Lirë, which initially aired on TV Arbëria (TVA), later on TV Klan from 2005 to 2007, than Vizion Plus (2007–2011), against to TV Klan (2011–2022) later ABC News Albania, to current airing on MCN TV.

== Public commentary ==
Çani is known for outspoken political commentary and has participated in numerous interviews and public debates on Albanian media. He has made controversial remarks regarding media and politics in Albania.

== Personal life ==
Çani is married to pediatric dentist Enida Petro. The couple has two children.
