= Albania (newspaper) =

Albanian newspaper

- Format: Tabloid
- Founded: 1995
- Ceased publication: ?
- Language: Albanian
- Headquarters: Tirana

Albania was a newspaper published in Tirana, Albania.

== History and profile ==
Albania was started in 1995 and began publication on 8 September of that year. The paper was published six times a week in tabloid format and had its headquarters in Tirana. It was owned by a private foundation led by Faik Konica. In the early 2000s the paper was owned by Ylli Rakipi. The paper had no political affiliation. At the beginning of the 2000s, its circulation was 5,750 copies.
