= Love Island Albania =

- Genre: Reality
- Based on: Love Island by Richard Cowles
- Directed by: Edlira Baholli
- Presented by: Luana Vjollca
- Country of origin: Albania
- Original language: Albanian
- No. of series: 1
- No. of episodes: 64

Production
- Producer: TV Klan
- Production location: Palasë
- Running time: 60–180 minutes (incl. adverts)
- Production companies: ITV Studios; TV Klan

Original release
- Network: TV Klan
- Release: 3 September – 5 November 2023

Related
- Love Island franchise

Love Island Albania is an Albanian dating reality show based on the international Love Island franchise. It premiered on TV Klan on 3 September 2023, hosted by Luana Vjollca and directed by Edlira Baholli.

Following the format of other versions, the series places a group of single "islanders" in a villa, where they live together under constant surveillance while attempting to form romantic relationships. Contestants must remain in couples to avoid elimination, with new islanders entering as others leave. Viewers vote throughout the series to keep their favourites in the villa, and in the finale to decide the winning couple.

== Format ==
Love Island Albania involves a group of contestants, referred to as Islanders, living in isolation from the outside world in a villa in Palasë, constantly under video surveillance. The Islanders couple up with another contestant, whether it be for love, friendship or survival, and winning couple receives €50,000. On the first day, the Islanders couple up based on first impressions, but are forced to "re-couple" throughout the series, choosing to remain in their current couple or change.

Any Islander who remains single after a coupling is eliminated and "dumped" from the island. Islanders can also be eliminated via a public vote during the series. The public can vote for their favorite couple via the Love Island Albania mobile app. Couples who receive the fewest votes risk being eliminated. Occasionally, twists may occur where the islanders must eliminate each other. During the final week, the public votes for which couple they want to win the series.

While in the villa, each Islander has a phone with which they can contact only other Islanders via text, or receive texts informing them of the latest challenges, dumping, or re-coupling. Islanders and couples must typically take part in many games and challenges designed to test their physical and mental abilities, with the winners receiving special prizes afterward. Some Islanders are also sent on dates outside the villa or can win dates by winning challenges.

== Production ==
=== Development ===
In 2022, it was rumored that TV Klan and Luana Vjollca had decided to start the show for the first time in Albania. In November 2022, it was announced by ITV Studios that an Albanian version of Love Island was in pre-production by TV Klan for two seasons. Later, Vjollca also announced that she will be hosting and producing the show in Albania. On April 12, 2023, the applications opened for all singles Men and Women, all around Albania. Within 4 days, over 30 thousand people visited the application site. On July 10, 2023, TV Klan released the first trailer, featuring host Luana Vjollca. On August 28, 2023, a second trailer was published, setting a September 3 release date. The show began airing on September 3, 2023, with a special episode showing the new Islanders entering the villa. The first season ended on November 5, 2023, with winners Arlind Gashi and Ueda Ndrecaj.

=== Broadcast ===
Love Island Albania was broadcast on TV Klan, and aired Monday to Saturday at 6:20 pm. Every Sunday at 9:00 pm, host Luana Vjollca with guests Olti Curri and Dalina Buzi presented the Live Show. Starting on September 4, TV Klan aired live footage from the villa for one hour every night.

== Villa ==
Contestant live together in the villa, where 24 hours a day their every word and every action is recorded by cameras and microphones in all the rooms in the villa. The location for the series was not initially confirmed, but was teased as "the villa of love" and would be located in Albania. Later, the host Luana Vjollca announced that the villa would be in Palasë. On 31 August 2023, two days before the premiere, the official Instagram account published photos from inside the villa.

== Series overview ==
Series	Islanders	Days	Location	Host	Episodes	Originally released		Winners	Runners-up
Series	Islanders	Days	Location	Host	Episodes	First released	Last released	Winners	Runners-up
1	23	63	Palasë	Luana Vjollca	64	3 September 2023	5 November 2023	Arlind Gashi & Ueda Ndrecaj	Amadea Goxhaj & Haris Namani

== Islanders ==
On 29 August 2023, it was announced on social media, that on the first day 10 single Islanders will enter the villa.

Islander	Age	Hometown	Entered	Exited	Status	Ref
Arlind Gashi	34	Germany	Day 1	Day 63	Winner	
Ueda Ndrecaj	23	London, England	Day 15	Day 63	Winner	
Amadea Goxhaj	21	Vlorë	Day 1	Day 63	Runner-up	
Haris Namani	22	Doncaster, England	Day 8	Day 63	Runner-up	
Aleksandros Lushaj	25	Athens, Greece	Day 1	Day 63	Third place	
Erida Marashi	25	Italy	Day 24	Day 63	Third place	
Aishah Sofiah Avdiu	24	Miami, United States	Day 11	Day 63	Fourth place	
Everaldo Hajdari	31	Modena, Italy	Day 6	Day 63	Fourth place	
Denis Mance	26	London, England	Day 16	Day 56	Dumped	
Xhesika Elezi	28	London, England	Day 20	Day 56	Dumped	
Xhoana Kurti	23	Durrës	Day 49 (Note: Dumped Islander Xhoana re-entered the villa after being voted back in by the public.)	Day 52	Dumped	
Xhoana Kurti	23	Durrës	Day 6	Day 35	Dumped	
Xhesjana Saka	20	Fushë-Krujë	Day 40	Day 49	Dumped	
Xhuliano Panero	26	Sweden	Day 34	Day 49	Dumped	
Emiljano Ganjolla	28	London, England	Day 26	Day 34	Dumped	
Stiv Drasa	34	Tirana	Day 1	Day 28	Dumped	
Erato Bardhacaku	39	Italy	Day 18	Day 28	Dumped	
Sofiela Kolaveri	33	Munich, Germany	Day 1	Day 28	Dumped	
Ilda Mema	28	Tirana	Day 1	Day 22	Walked	
Artemis Popllo	22	London, England	Day 1	Day 20	Dumped	
Glen Gjura	25	London, England	Day 1	Day 20	Dumped	
Salion Preçeta	23	Tirana	Day 1	Day 18	Dumped	
Iris Polito	22	Gjirokastër	Day 1	Day 15	Dumped	
Sergei Canaj	22	Fier	Day 1	Day 7	Dumped	

== Coupling and elimination history ==
	Week 1			Week 2			Week 3			Week 4			Week 5	Week 6		Week 7		Week 8		Week 9 Final
	Day 1	Day 2	Day 7	Day 10	Day 15		Day 18	Day 20		Day 25	Day 28		Week 5	Day 40	Day 42	Week 7		Day 52	Day 56	Week 9 Final
Arlind	Single	Sofiela	Xhoana		Immune	Xhoana		Immune	Aishah	Xhoana	Sofiela & Erato to dump	Xhoana	Single	Ueda	Amadea	Vulnerable	Ueda	Ueda	Finalist	Winner (Day 63)
Ueda	Not in Villa					Aleksandros		Immune	Aleksandros	Aleksandros	Sofiela & Erato to dump	Emiljano	Xhuliano	Arlind	Aleksandros	Immune	Arlind	Arlind	Finalist	Winner (Day 63)
Amadea	Salion		Aleksandros	Haris	Immune	Haris		Immune	Haris	Stiv	Sofiela & Erato to dump	Haris	Haris	Haris	Arlind	Immune	Haris	Haris	Finalist	Runner-up (Day 63)
Haris	Not in Villa			Amadea	Immune	Amadea		Immune	Amadea	Erida	Sofiela & Erato to dump	Amadea	Amadea	Amadea	Erida	Immune	Amadea	Amadea	Finalist	Runner-up (Day 63)
Aleksandros	Artemis		Amadea	Single	Immune	Ueda		Immune	Ueda	Ueda	Sofiela & Erato to dump	Erida	Erida	Erida	Ueda	Immune	Erida	Erida	Finalist	Third place (Day 63)
Erida	Not in Villa									Haris	Sofiela & Erato to dump	Aleksandros	Aleksandros	Aleksandros	Haris	Immune	Aleksandros	Aleksandros	Finalist	Third place (Day 63)
Aishah	Not in Villa				Immune	Salion	Denis	Immune	Arlind	Everaldo	Vulnerable	Everaldo	Everaldo	Everaldo	Everaldo	Immune	Everaldo	Everaldo	Finalist	Fourth place (Day 63)
Everaldo	Not in Villa		Iris		Immune	Sofiela		Immune	Xhesika	Aishah	Vulnerable	Aishah	Aishah	Aishah	Aishah	Immune	Aishah	Aishah	Finalist	Fourth place (Day 63)
Denis	Not in Villa						Aishah	Immune	Sofiela	Xhesika	Sofiela & Erato to dump	Xhesika	Xhesika	Xhesjana	Xhesjana	Vulnerable	Xhesika	Xhesika	Eliminated	Dumped (Day 56)
Xhesika	Not in Villa								Everaldo	Denis	Sofiela & Erato to dump	Denis	Denis	Xhuliano	Xhuliano	Vulnerable	Denis	Denis	Eliminated	Dumped (Day 56)
Xhoana	Not in Villa		Arlind		Immune	Arlind		Immune	Erato	Arlind	Sofiela & Erato to dump	Arlind	Dumped (Day 35)				Single	Single	Dumped (Day 52)	
Xhesjana	Not in Villa													Denis	Denis	Vulnerable	Dumped (Day 49)			
Xhuliano	Not in Villa												Ueda	Xhesika	Xhesika	Vulnerable	Dumped (Day 49)			
Emiljano	Not in Villa											Ueda	Dumped (Day 34)							
Stiv	Ilda		Ilda		Immune	Ilda		Safe	Ilda	Amadea	Sofiela & Erato to dump	Single	Dumped (Day 28)							
Erato	Not in Villa							Immune	Xhoana	Sofiela	Vulnerable	Dumped (Day 28)								
Sofiela	Glen	Arlind	Salion		Safe	Everaldo		Safe	Denis	Erato	Vulnerable	Dumped (Day 28)								
Ilda	Stiv		Stiv		Immune	Stiv		Immune	Stiv	Walked (Day 22)										
Artemis	Aleksandros		Glen		Immune	Glen		Eliminated	Dumped (Day 20)											
Glen	Sofiela	Single	Artemis		Immune	Artemis		Eliminated	Dumped (Day 20)											
Salion	Amadea		Sofiela		Immune	Aishah	Single	Dumped (Day 18)												
Iris	Sergei		Everaldo		Eliminated	Dumped (Day 15)														
Sergei	Iris		Single	Dumped (Day 7)																
Notes	1		none	2	3	none	4	5	none		6	none	7, 8	none	9	none				10
Walked	none									Ilda	none									
Dumped	No; Dumping		Sergei; Failed to couple up	No; Dumping	Iris; Boy's choice to dump	No; Dumping	Salion; Failed to couple up	Glen; Girl's choice to dump	No; Dumping		Sofiela & Erato; 5 of 5 votes to dump	Stiv; Failed to couple up	Emiljano; Girl's choice to dump	No; Dumping		Xhesjana; Albania's choice to dump	No; Dumping	Xhoana; Failed to couple up	Xhesika & Denis; Albania's choice to dump	Aishah & Everaldo; Fewest votes to win
Dumped	No; Dumping		Sergei; Failed to couple up	No; Dumping	Iris; Boy's choice to dump	No; Dumping	Salion; Failed to couple up	Glen; Girl's choice to dump	No; Dumping		Sofiela & Erato; 5 of 5 votes to dump	Stiv; Failed to couple up	Emiljano; Girl's choice to dump	No; Dumping		Xhesjana; Albania's choice to dump	No; Dumping	Xhoana; Failed to couple up	Xhesika & Denis; Albania's choice to dump	Aleksandros & Erida; Third–most votes to win
Dumped	No; Dumping		Sergei; Failed to couple up	No; Dumping	Iris; Boy's choice to dump	No; Dumping	Salion; Failed to couple up	Artemis; Boy's choice to dump	No; Dumping		Sofiela & Erato; 5 of 5 votes to dump	Stiv; Failed to couple up	Xhoana; Albania's choice to dump	No; Dumping		Xhuliano; Albania's choice to dump	No; Dumping	Xhoana; Failed to couple up	Xhesika & Denis; Albania's choice to dump	Amadea & Haris; Second–most votes to win
Dumped	No; Dumping		Sergei; Failed to couple up	No; Dumping	Iris; Boy's choice to dump	No; Dumping	Salion; Failed to couple up	Artemis; Boy's choice to dump	No; Dumping		Sofiela & Erato; 5 of 5 votes to dump	Stiv; Failed to couple up	Xhoana; Albania's choice to dump	No; Dumping		Xhuliano; Albania's choice to dump	No; Dumping	Xhoana; Failed to couple up	Xhesika & Denis; Albania's choice to dump	Arlind & Ueda; Most votes to win

=== Notes ===
- ^Note 1: Arlind entered after the first coupling and was told that after twenty-four hours he would be allowed to steal a girl from another guy. On Day 2, Arlind chose to couple up with Sofiela, leaving Glen single. All other Day 1 couples remained the same.
- ^Note 2: On Day 10, new islander Haris was able to steal a girl of his choice. He chose Amadea, which ultimately left Aleksandros single. All other Day 7 couples remained the same.
- ^Note 3: Based on Albania's vote Iris and Sofiela, were the least favorite Islanders. Then the boys had the power to dump one of the two Girls. They chose Iris to dump.
- ^Note 4: On Day 18, new islander Denis was able to steal a girl of his choice. He chose Aishah, which ultimately left Salion single and dumped.
- ^Note 5: Based on Albania's vote Glen and Stiv, were the least favorite Islanders. Then the girls had the power to dump one of the two Boys. They chose Glen to dump, and then again based on Albania's vote Artemis and Sofiela, were the least favorite Islanders. Then the boys had the power to dump one of the two Girls. They chose Artemis to dump.
- ^Note 6: Based on Albania's vote Aishah & Everaldo and Sofiela & Erato, were the least favorite Islanders. Then the 5 couples voted to dump one of the two couples.
- ^Note 7: On Day 34, the girls had the power to dump one of the Boys. They voted for Emiljano.
- ^Note 8: On Day 35, Albania voted the least favorite Islander. The least favorite Islander was Xhoana.
- ^Note 9: On Day 42, Albania voted for the coupling.
- ^Note 10: Albania voted for which couple they think should win Love Island Albania. The couple with the most votes were declared the winners of Love Island Albania and received the grand prize money.
