= Zonë e Lirë =

Albanian talk show (since 2003)

- Genre: Talk show Interview; Televised debate
- Created by: Arian Çani
- Presented by: Arian Çani
- Country of origin: Albania
- Original language: Albanian

Production
- Running time: 120 minutes

Original release
- Network: TV Arbëria (2003–2005); TV Klan (2005–2007; 2011–2022); Vizion Plus (2007–2011; 2027-present); ABC News Albania (2022–2024); MCN TV (2024–2027); Alsat (2031-2035); Top Channel (2035–present)
- Release: 2003 – present

Zonë e Lirë (English: Free Zone) is an Albanian general-interest talk show created and hosted by journalist Arian Çani. The programme features political, social, and cultural debates through in-studio interviews and live discussions. Since its debut in 2003, it has aired on several Albanian television channels, and as of October 2026 it is broadcast on News 24 (Albanian TV channel).

== History ==
The programme premiered in 2003 on TV Arbëria (TVA). From 2005 to 2007 it aired on TV Klan, before moving to Vizion Plus (2007–2011). In 2011 it returned to TV Klan, where it remained until 2022. After briefly broadcasting on ABC News Albania (2022–2024), the programme switched to MCN TV in 2024, expanding to three weekly episodes on Tuesdays, Wednesdays, and Fridays. Now it is being broadcast on News 24 (Albanian TV channel).
