= Renzo Bossi =

Italian politician

- Born: 8 September 1988 (age 37); Varese, Italy
- Occupations: Influencer, former politician
- Height: 1.70 m (5 ft 7 in)

Renzo Bossi (born 8 September 1988) is an Italian former politician influencer and the son of Umberto Bossi, founder and former leader of the Lega Nord party. In 2010, he was elected as a member of the Regional Council of Lombardy. He is known as "il trota" (Italian for "the trout") since 2008, when Umberto Bossi was asked if he considered Renzo to be his dauphin (dauphin and dolphin are homonym in Italian) and he jokingly compared him to some trout instead.

== Biography ==
Bossi was born to Manuela Marrone and Umberto Bossi, both active in the early days of the Lega Lombarda and the Lega Nord. During January 2009, he took his first official position in the movement when he became a member of the Monitoring Centre for transparency and effectiveness in Fiera Milano. In the same year, he became an ordinary member of the Lega Nord and in 2010 he was a candidate in the Lombard regional election. His candidacy was controversial since it did not respect the party's internal regulations about seniority. Despite the criticism of apparent nepotism, he was elected in the Regional Council with 12,893 votes.

During the investigation regarding the misappropriation of party funding in April 2010, circumstantial evidence about his involvement was found and by the end of the month he resigned from his position in the council. In an Interview for Oggi his personal driver and bodyguard, Alessandro Marmello, revealed footage proving Renzo Bossi's illegal activities. He was officially charged with embezzlement when the public prosecutor in Milan began the investigation in May.

In the same year a bachelor's degree in economics and management earned by Bossi at Kristal University in Albania was found during a search performed by Guardia di Finanza officers. The faculty director claimed that Renzo Bossi started attending the courses in 2007, before completing secondary school. In early December 2013, he was later charged with corruption in Albania because he earned a degree in social sciences without spending a single day in university. He has never been in Albania, and he does not know the language.
