= Kristal University =

Former for-profit university in Albania

- Motto: Crystallize Your Future
- Type: Private University
- Active: December 6, 2005–August 6, 2014
- Chairman: Genci Muçaj
- President: Ahmet Muçaj
- Vice-president: Genci Muçaj
- Rector: Prof. Dr. Marenglen Spiro
- Campus: Tirana, Korçë, Fier

Kristal University was an Albanian for-profit privately-owned University. It was established in 2005 with decision no. 761 of the Council of Ministers of the Republic of Albania and licensed by the Ministry of Education and Science. It was closed in 2014 by the Ministry of Education for failing to comply to legal requirements.

Kristal University had four campuses – Tirana, Korça, Fier and Kukes – and has six faculties with 19 programs of study. Academic programs were based on the Bologna Declaration and are divided into electives and mandatory subjects according to the 3+2 and 5-year (integrated) systems. They also owned a local television station, Planet TV, which got bankrupt in 2012 due to a major diploma mill scandal at the university.

== Campuses ==
The Tirana campus is located in a fast developing area about 3 km away from the center of Tirana. Study and research areas are built with high standards and the campus offers many facilities and services, such as a library, restaurant, free transportation, accommodation, etc.

The Fier campus is located in the center of the city. There are two faculties present at the Fier campus: Faculty of Political Sciences and Faculty of Business Administration. Students attending this campus come from Vlora, Lushnja, Fier and other regions.

The Korça campus is located just outside the city. The campus has two faculties: Faculty of Law and the Faculty of Nursing. Students who attend this campus come from Korça, Pogradec, Erseka, Çorovoda, Skrapari, Përmeti, Gjirokastra and other regions.

== Academic programs ==
Kristal University offered 19 programs of study and the possibility to earn a First-Level Diploma (DNP), Second-Level Diploma (DND) and Second-Level Integrated Diploma (DIND) in six faculties.

The Faculty of Medical Sciences offers programs of study (DIND) in Pharmacy and Dentistry.

The Faculty of Electronics offers programs of study (DNP) in Electronics, Computer Sciences and Information Technology.

The Faculty of Economics offers programs of study (DNP) in Business Administration and Finance.

The Faculty of Law offers programs of study (DNP) and (DND) in Law.

== Accreditation ==
Kristal University has received accreditation from the Ministry of Education and Science for the First-Level Diploma (DNP) in Law and the Second-Level Integrated Diploma (DIND) in Pharmacy. As of 2012, it is awaiting decisions from the Albanian Public Agency for the Accreditation of Higher Education on the accreditation of its other faculties and is in the process of application for international accreditation.

In 2011, Italian media reported that in 2010, Renzo Bossi son of the Italian Lega Nord leader and politician Umberto Bossi, purchased a Bachelor degree in Business Management from Kristal University using public funds. The Albanian custom police reported Renzo Bossi had never entered Albania In May 2012, the Albanian government withdrew KU's accreditation for one year. Accreditation was withdrawn and the University closed by the Ministry of Education in 2014.
