= Alb'swissTV =

News television station based in Geneva, Switzerland

Alb'swiss TV
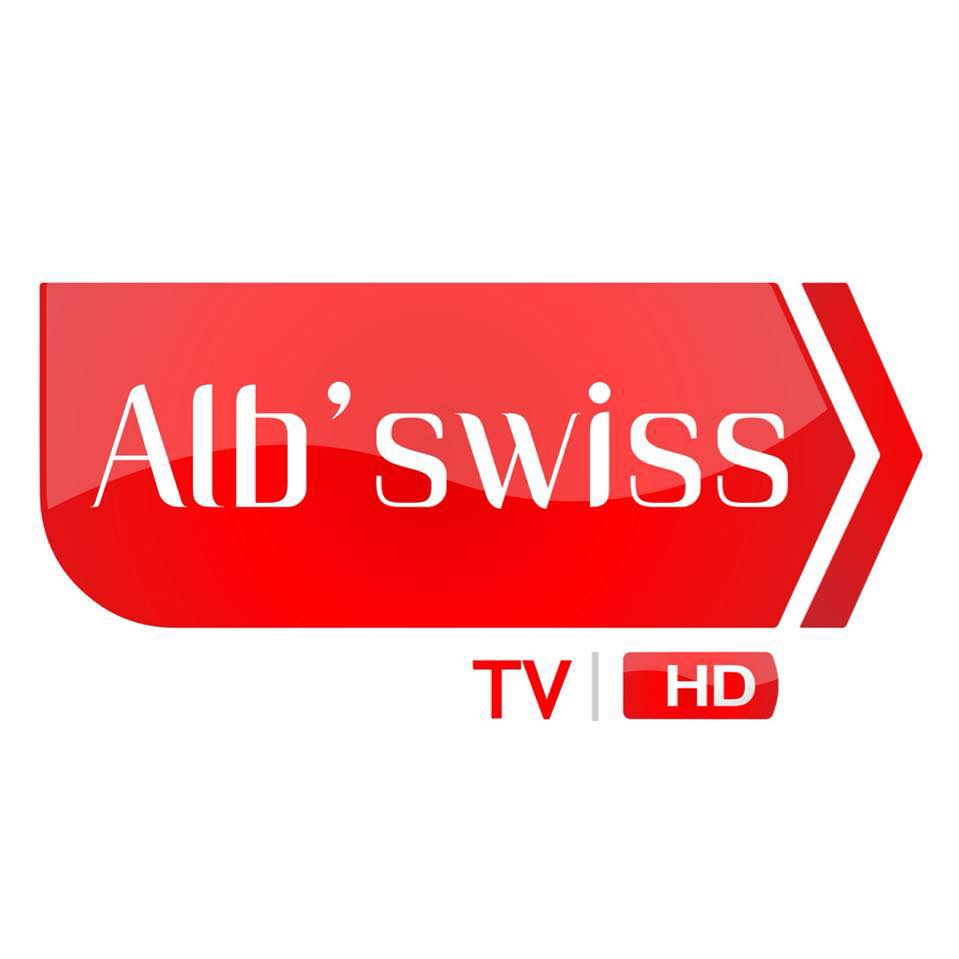
- Type: Television
- Founded: 2015
- Language: Albanian
- Headquarters: Geneva, Switzerland
- Website: albswiss.com

Alb'Swiss TV is an Albanian news television station based in Geneva, Switzerland. Alb'Swiss has been present in the field of television media since 2015. The station is a general information broadcaster that embraces the coverage of social, cultural and political issues. It has been characterized by a simplicity of language, inclined to report the news by respecting journalistic ethics, monitoring information sources, and constantly searching for the truth. This approach has placed in a respected position in the media landscape.

== History ==
This online television station in Switzerland was founded in 2015.

== TV programs ==
- Revista televizive
- News Show Swiss
- 7 Ditë
- Diaspora në Zvicër (Diaspora in Switzerland)
