= Kamëz =

- Municipality
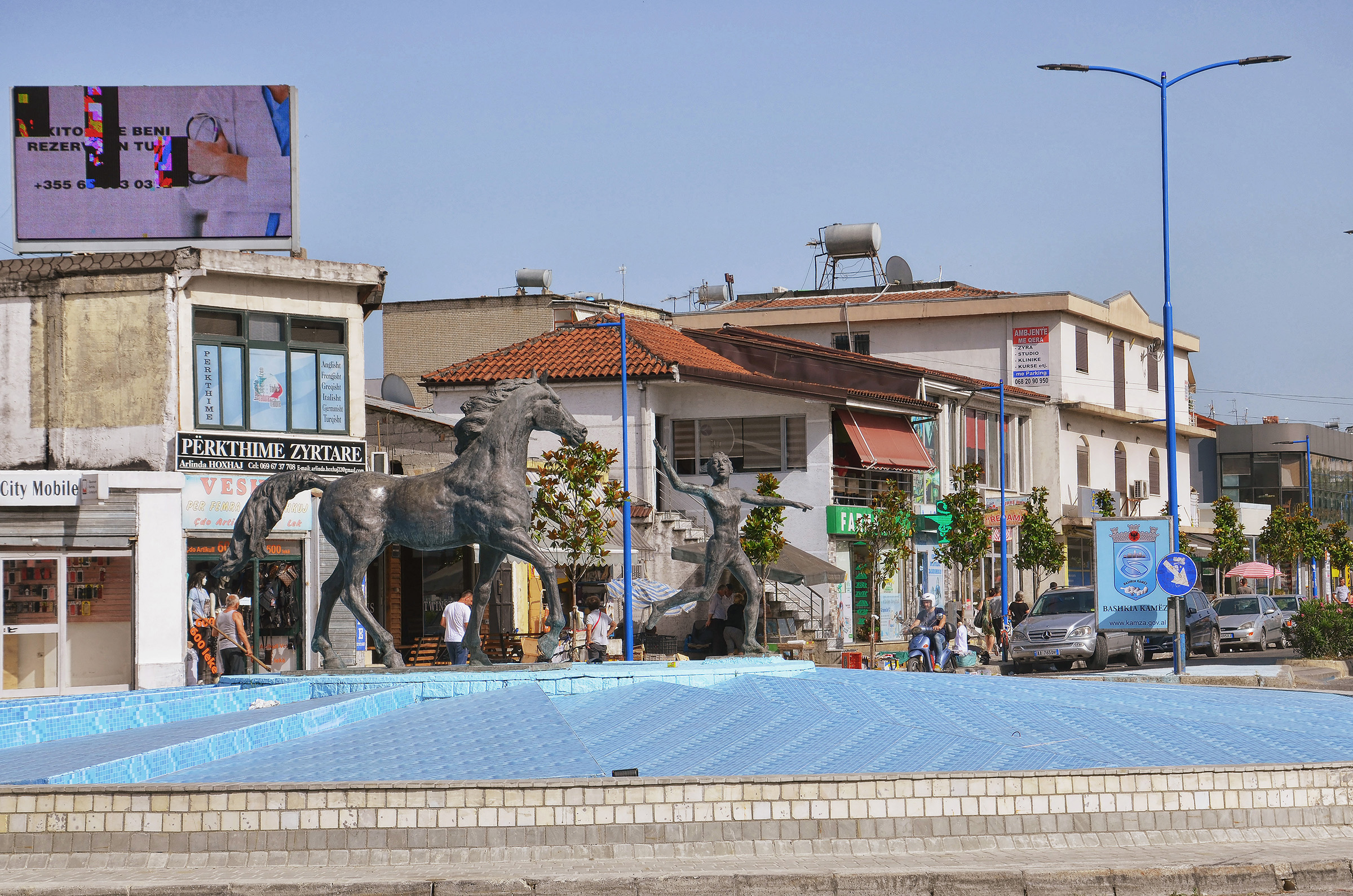
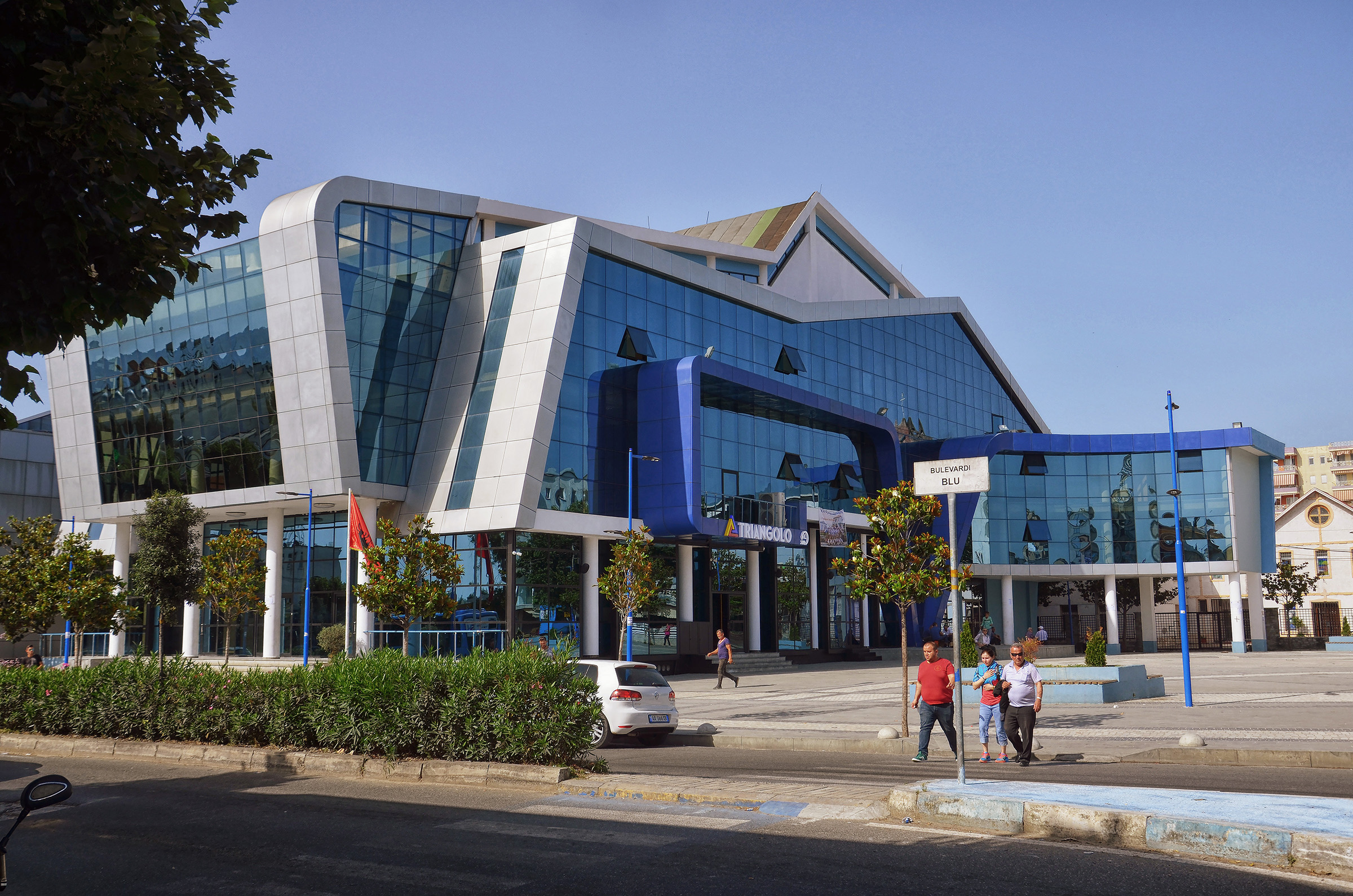
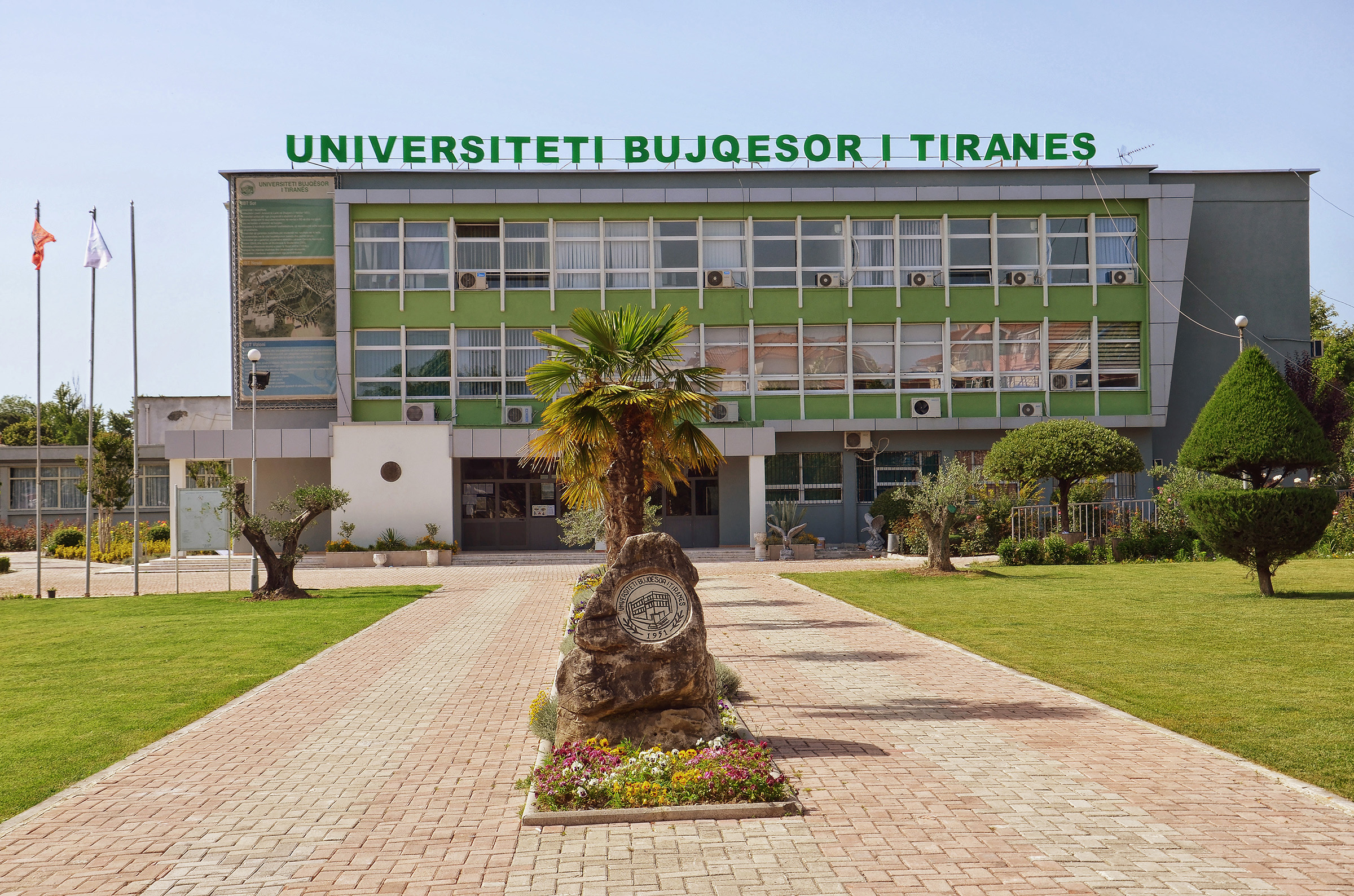
- From the top, Kamëz Town centre, Palace of Culture, Agricultural University of Tirana

- Emblem

- Location within Albania
- Coordinates: 41°23′N 19°46′E
- Country: Albania
- County: Tirana

Government
  - Mayor: Rakip Suli (PS)

Area
  - Municipality: 37.20 km^{2} (14.36 sq mi)
  - Administrative unit: 24.07 km^{2} (9.29 sq mi)
- Elevation: 90 m (300 ft)

Population (2023)
  - Municipality: 96,137
  - Municipality density: 2,584/km^{2} (6,693/sq mi)
  - Administrative unit: 61,739
  - Administrative unit density: 2,565/km^{2} (6,643/sq mi)
- Time zone: UTC+1 (CET)
  - Summer (DST): UTC+2 (CEST)
- Postal Code: 1030
- Area Code: (0)47
- Website: kamza.gov.al

Kamëz (Albanian definite form: Kamza) is a municipality in Tirana County, Albania. It was formed at the 2015 local government reform by the merger of the former municipalities Kamëz and Paskuqan, that became municipal units. The seat of the municipality is the town Kamëz. The municipality's population is 96,137 as of the 2023 census, while the municipal unit has a population of 61,739, in a total area of 37.20 km^{2}.

Historical population
Year	Pop.	±%
1989	8,589	—
2001	44,443	+417.4%
2011	66,841	+50.4%
2023	61,739	−7.6%

Kamëz was one of the applicants for the 2019 European Green Capital Awards, which was won by Oslo.

== History ==
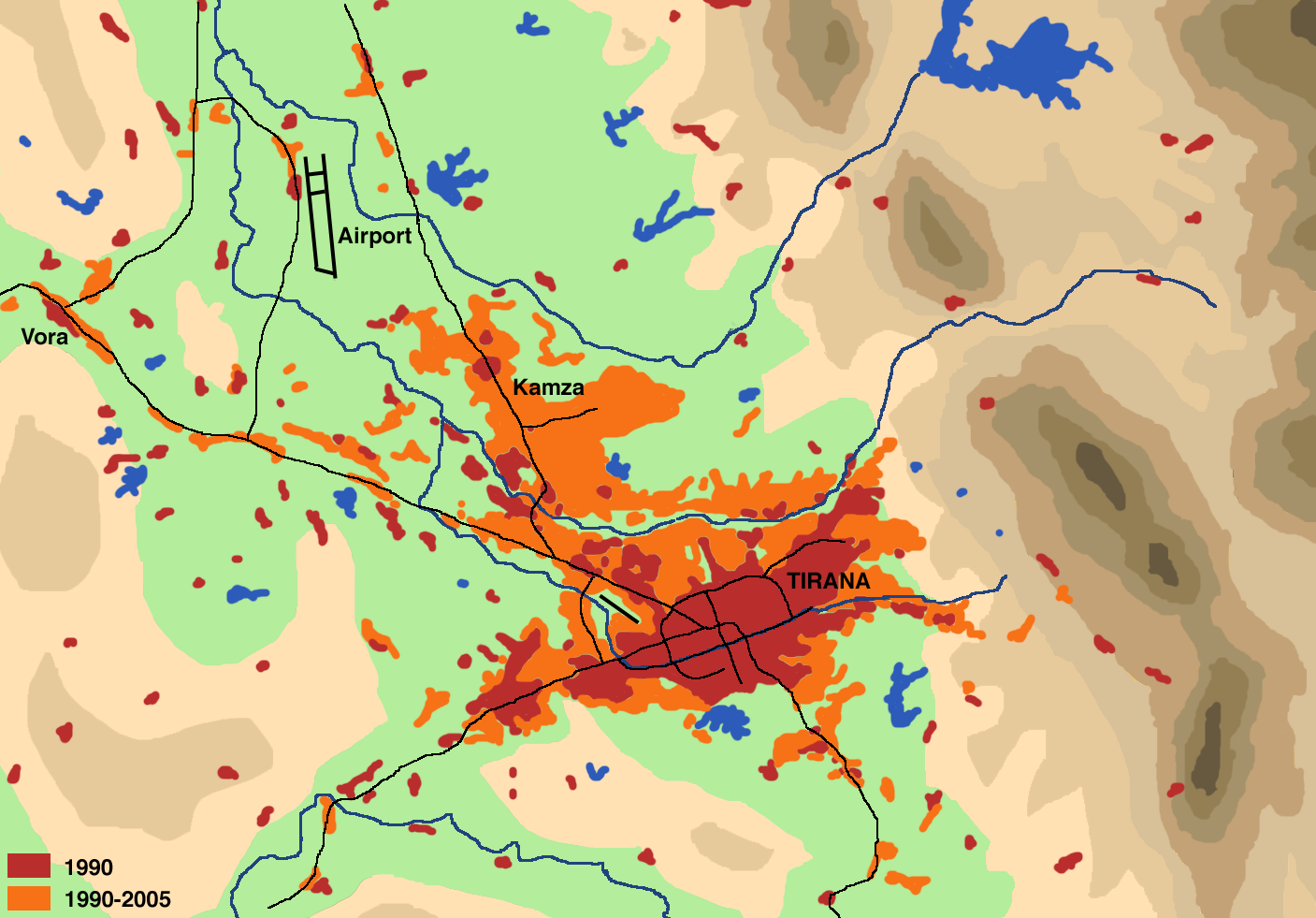
Tirana&Kamza Expansion

Kamez is located on the site of an Ancient Illyrian village. The area may have been visited by Emperor Justinian I or Belisarius. Before the 1990s, Kamëz was a sparsely populated and predominantly agricultural area. Following the post 1990s Albanian population movements, the area experienced massive influxes of inhabitants from all over Albania. The newly formed city is known to bear impressive street names belonging to international personalities, capital cities, and organizations, such as : Paris, Tokyo, the World Bank, Donald Trump, George Bush, Silvio Berlusconi or Nicolas Sarkozy.

== Subdivisions ==
The municipality Kamëz consists of the town Kamëz and the following villages:

- Babrru
- Bathore
- Bulçesh
- Fushë e Kërçikëve
- Frutikulturë
- Kodër e Kuqe
- Kodër-Babrru
- Laknas
- Paskuqan
- Paskuqan-Fushë
- Paskuqan-Kodër
- Shpat
- Valias
- Zall-Mner

== Sports ==
The main football team, KS Kamza, plays in the Albanian Second Division at Fusha Sportive Kamëz. It is the site of the Agricultural University of Tirana. The basketball team BC Kamza Basket are 6 times national champions and play their home games at Salla Sportive Bathore.

== Twin and sister towns ==
- Castenaso, Italy
- Kemalpaşa, Turkey
- Macerata, Italy
- Yonkers, United States

=== Cooperation and friendship ===
Kamëz also cooperates with:

- Jena, Germany
