= Valias =

- Village
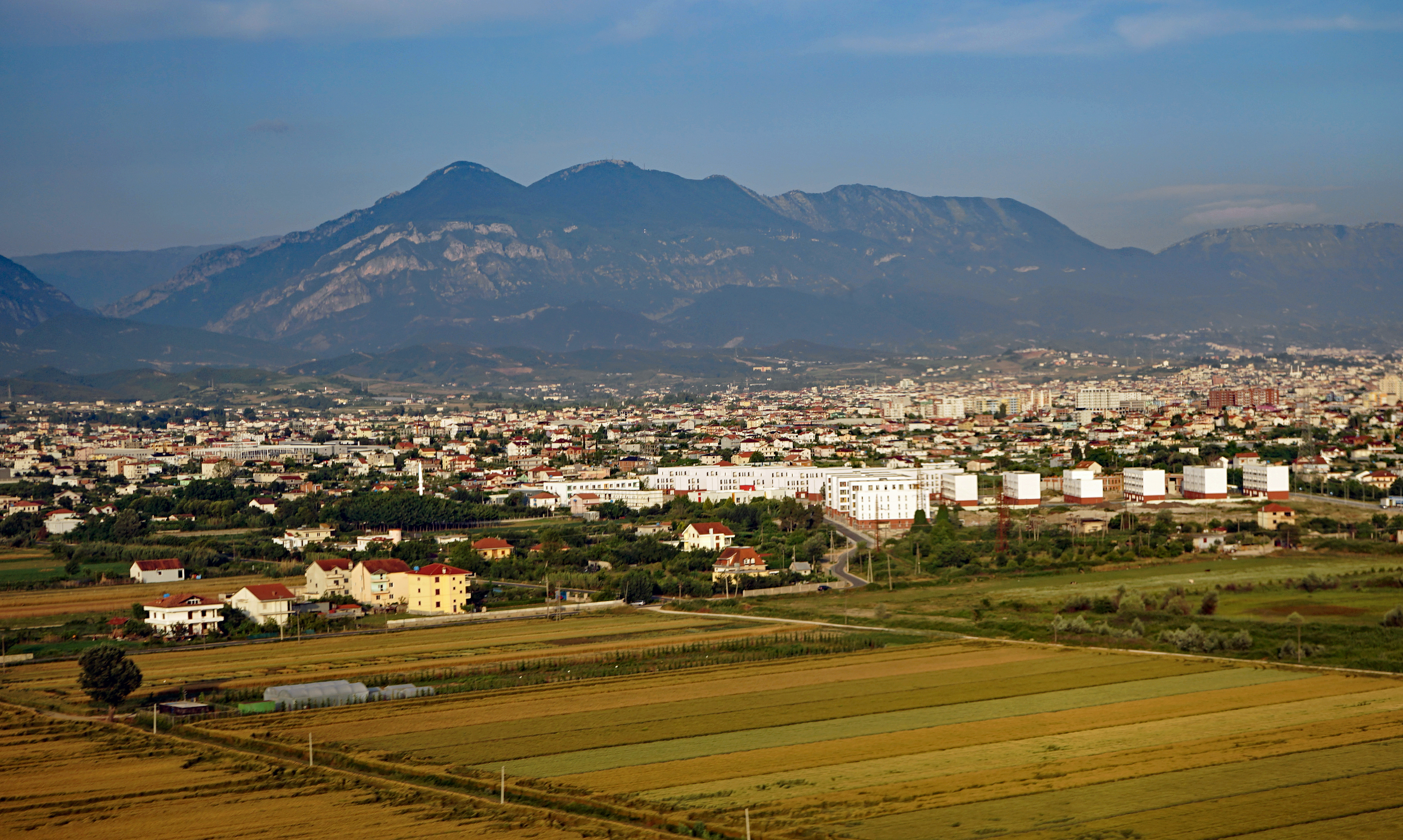

- Location within Albania
- Coordinates: 41°23′30″N 19°44′20″E
- Country: Albania
- County: Tirana
- Municipality: Kamëz
- Administrative unit: Kamëz
- Time zone: UTC+1 (CET)
  - Summer (DST): UTC+2 (CEST)

Valias is a village in Tirana County, Albania. It is part of the municipality Kamëz.
