= Nesër TV =

Nesër TV (NTV)
- Country: Albania
- Broadcast area: Worldwide

History
- Launched: 2003 (1998 first air date)

Links
- Website: ntv.al

Nesër TV abbreviated as NTV, is a local private television station in Tirana, Albania. NTV has been present in the field of television media since 1998, and received broadcasting rights in 2003. The station is a general information broadcaster that embraces the coverage of social, cultural and political issues in Albania. NTV has been characterized by a simplicity of language, respect for journalistic ethics, monitoring information sources, and constantly searching for the truth. This approach has placed NTV in a respected position in the media landscape.

== Programs ==
- Radiokroaci
- Stock Time
- Lajmi i parë ndryshe
- DW program i përditshëm
- Casting
- Euro Zone
- Pink
- Profil
- Reportazh
- Përtej lajmit
- Forum Sondazh
- 8a8
- Memorie
- Busull
- Këndvështrim
- Informal
- Eja
- Corner
- Trafik
- Radio Taksi

== See also ==
- Television in Albania
