= Tirana TV =

Albanian television channel

- Country: Albania

Ownership
- Owner: Haxhi Isufi

History
- Launched: 2000
- Former names: TV 2000

Links
- Website: tiranatv.com

Availability

Terrestrial
- Analog: PAL (ch 35 UHF in Tirana)
- Digital: DVB-T

Tirana TV was a music television station based in Albania. It mainly broadcast Albanian music as well as satirical episodes from well known Albanian satirists.

In 2019, the channel closed down and bought by Albanian journalist Clirim Peka to start the new Albanian news television Syri Television in 2020.
