= IN TV (Albania) =

- Country: Albania
- Broadcast area: Albania; Kosovo; United States
- Headquarters: Tirana, Albania

Programming
- Language: Albanian
- Picture format: 16:9 (576i) SDTV; 16:9 (1080i) HDTV

Ownership
- Owner: IN Media

History
- Launched: 16 June 2014 (as MAD Albania); 29 December 2015 (as IN TV)

Links
- Website: www.intv.al

IN TV is an Albanian private television channel dedicated to the young audience. It was launched on 16 June 2014 as MAD Albania, a music channel. MAD Albania won the prize of "The Best Albanian Music Channel" at the IMA Awards 2015. Since 29 December 2015 the channel is known as IN TV, and it changed its programming into a general channel.In October 2019 the channel and the radio (IN 105.7 FM) were bought by Euronews Albania, and began the broadcast on November of the same year.

IN's programming covers celebrities, television, society, movies, music, fashion, beauty and lifestyle, The company also organises events.

== Programming ==
=== Original programs ===
- 3JAT
- Adrenalinë
- Balkan Trip
- Blender
- CineFun
- CineLove
- CineMania
- Dream Lab
- EuroBeat
- Fun Day
- Gossip Girl
- IN Axhenda
- IN da Hood
- IN Documentaries
- IN Life
- IN News
- IN Report
- IN Style
- IN Topic
- INstaBuzz
- Kafe IN
- Kripë dhe Piper
- Life Stories
- LIKE Shqip
- Morning Tunes
- Një kat më lart
- People's Voice
- Kolaudim
- Retrovision
- Rock Top
- Sweet Lab
- Trokit
- Then and Now
- Time Machine
- Vip Room
- Zoom IN

=== TV Series ===
Name	Origin
2 Broke Girls	United States
Blue Bloods	United States
Brousko	Greece
Brooklyn Nine-Nine	United States
Criminal Minds	United States
Dance Moms	United States
Drake & Josh	United States
Devious Maids	United States
Empire	United States
Everwood	United States
Glee	United States
Geordie Shore	United Kingdom
Gossip Girl	United States
How I Met Your Mother	United States
iCarly	United States
My Little Pony: Friendship Is Magic	United States
Malcolm in the Middle	United States
Once Upon a Time	United States
Parenthood	United States
Popland!	Colombia
Pokémon	Japan
Escobar, el patrón del mal!	Colombia
Pretty Little Liars	United States
Sam & Cat	United States
See Dad Run	United States
The Blacklist	United States
Third Watch	United States
The Greenhouse	Israel
The Thundermans	United States
The Vampire Diaries	United States
The Client List	United States
T.U.F.F. Puppy	United States
The Simpsons	United States
Victorious	United States
Young Sheldon	United States
Dirt	United States

== See also ==
- Television in Albania
