= Bathore =

- Village
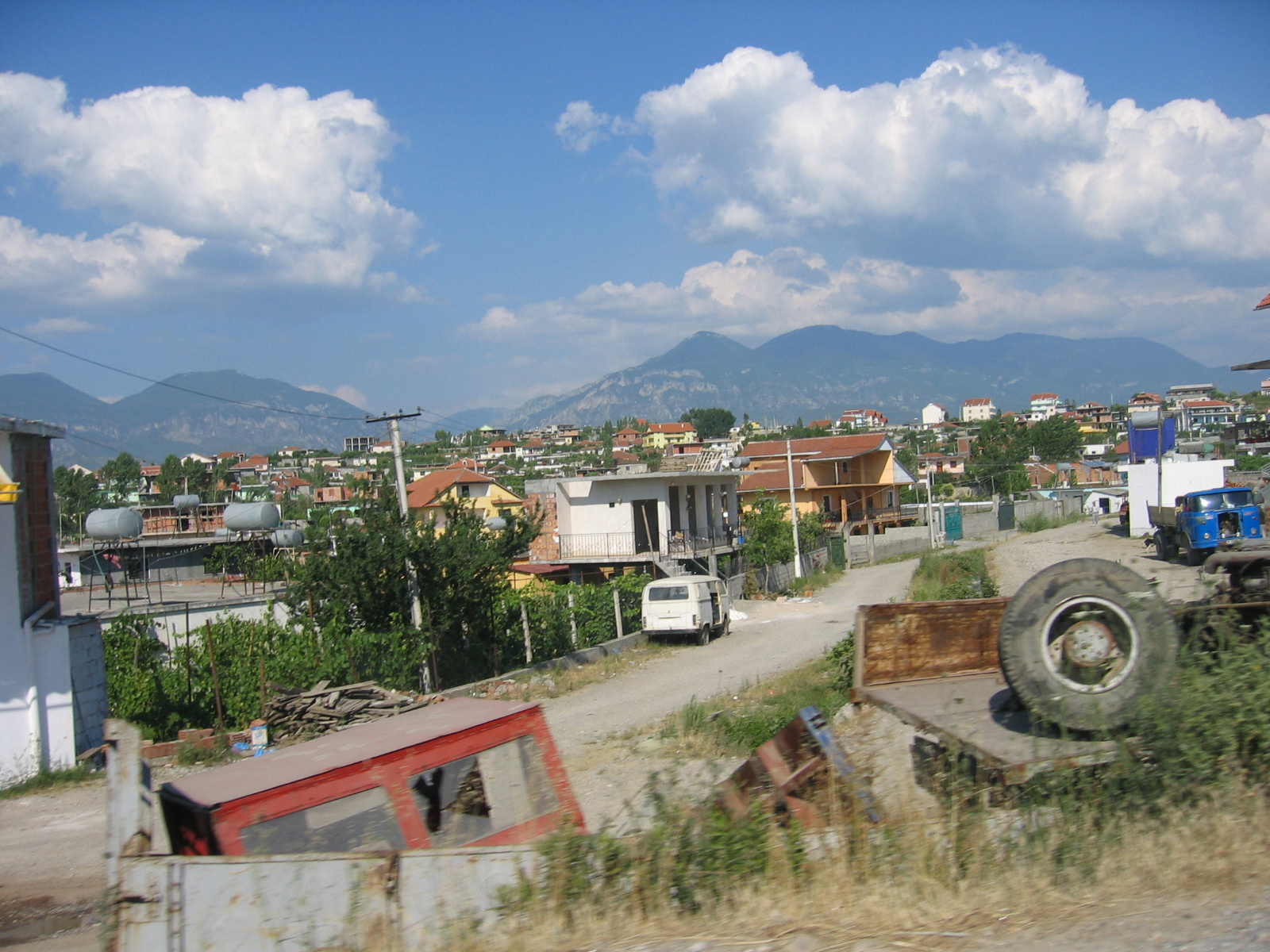
- Bathore village

- Location within Albania
- Coordinates: 41°22′10″N 19°46′40″E
- Country: Albania
- County: Tirana
- Municipality: Kamëz
- Administrative unit: Kamëz
- Time zone: UTC+1 (CET)
  - Summer (DST): UTC+2 (CEST)

Bathore is an area in the county of Tirana, the capital of Albania. It is part of the municipality Kamëz. The area, comprising approximately 5 square kilometres (2 sq mi) was a collective farm run by the state under communism.

They had no electricity or water, and were funded by money sent from relatives abroad. They built permanent housing in the hope that this would make an eviction harder for the authorities. The authorities attempted to evict the settlement in 1995, but the squatters fought back and took the deputy prime minister Tritan Shehu hostage.

By 2000, 60 per cent of new inhabitants bought their land from previous squatters, 20 per cent squatted, 6 per cent were given land by the authorities, 2 per cent bought from pre-independence owners and 10 per cent used other methods. The residents promoted slum upgrading and requested infrastructure. Three years later, the 40,000 squatters were tired of waiting on government promises and announced they would march on the capital Tirana. The government quickly acceded to nine out of their ten demands. Bathore has become a middle class suburb of Tirana, connected to all utilities.
