= Television in Albania =

Television in Albania was first introduced in 1960. RTSH dominated the Albanian broadcasting field up to the mid-90s, a period when privately owned radio and TV stations started to occupy the vast empty Albanian frequencies.

From the 1960s until the 1980s, RTSH simulcasted Italian public broadcaster Rai programming however UHF receivers were banned from Albanian TV sets requiring locals to use artisan made receivers called kanaçe made of aluminum cans to capture foreign UHF broadcasters.

Listening to foreign media privately was outlawed and anyone caught risked harsh penalties such as imprisonment.

RTSH owns and operates a vast number of transmitter sites throughout the country such as the Fushe Dajt and Dajt 1613m stations at Mount Dajt in the periphery of Tirana. As such, a number of Western radio and TV broadcasters leased the sites to broadcast their own feeds free-to-air during the 1990s until early 2000s, when a law was passed to protect the Albanian television industry and put these stations in pay TV platforms.

During this period, a law was also passed requiring all stations to translate foreign programming by providing subtitles in Albanian language which until then used to air mostly in Italian and later English languages without translation.

Simulcasting of foreign outlets was also common such as CNN International and Italian regional and music channels mainly by Italian owned stations.

After several years of being stalled, deadlines for transition to DTV broadcasting are being continuously announced until all subscribers are equipped with digital antennas.

Albania has 3 national commercial television stations, 56 local stations, 83 local cable stations and two commercial multiplexes.

Of all the existing national television stations, the public broadcaster Radio Televizioni Shqiptar (RTSH) has the greatest reach: its signal covers 80.5% of the territory, followed by Top Channel with 79%, and TV Klan with 78%. However, there are also digital multiplexes but they are unaccounted for in the territorial reach figures.

It could be said that the other main TV stations, based in Tirana, whose signal covers a significant part of the territory include: Ora News, Ora TV, News 24, Top News, Panorama TV, Report TV, RTV Scan, BBF TV, Vizion Plus. Apart from the latter stations, most others are round-the-clock news channels. Euronews and CNN International have opened their own franchises in Albania.

Digital broadcasting is available mainly in Tirana and Durrës, though it is gradually being introduced to the western lowland and further inland.

== Albanian television channels ==
- RTSH
- Top Channel
- Tv Klan
- Vizion Plus
- Alsat
- News 24 Albania
- RTV Ora
- Report TV
- A2 CNN
- ABC
- Fax News
- Ora News
- Euronews Albania
- MCN TV
- SCAN TV
- Syri TV
- Shijak TV
- IN TV
- Club TV
- CNA TV
- Premium Channel
- Bubble TV
- Panorama TV
- MCN 24
- Dritare TV

== See also ==
- List of television stations in Albania
- Media of Albania
