= Ora News =

Albanian TV news channel

Ora News (ORA)
- Country: Albania

Ownership
- Owner: Ylli Ndroqi
- Sister channels: Radio Ora News 96.7 FM (Tirana)

History
- Launched: January 31, 2007

Links
- Website: www.oranews.tv

Ora News is a regional and online television news channel based in Tirana, Albania, which was founded on January 31, 2007. The news director is Miriam Ndroqi.

The Albanian Media Monitoring Board evaluated Ora News as the most balanced news presenter of the parliamentary elections in June 2009 and again in May 2011 for the local elections.

== See also ==
- Television in Albania
