= Televizioni Klan =

Albanian television network

TV Klan
- Type: Private television network
- Country: Albania
- Headquarters: Tirana, Albania

Programming
- Language: Albanian
- Picture format: 4:3 (576i) SDTV (1997-present); 16:9 (1080i) HDTV (2012-2026)

Ownership
- Owner: Aleksandër Frangaj (60%); Alba Gina (40%)
- Parent: TVKlan Sh.A.
- Key people: Aleksandër Frangaj (CEO)
- Sister channels: Klan Plus; Klan Macedonia; Klan News; ABC News; Klan Radio; Klan Music; Klan Sport

History
- Founded: 1 August 1997 (29 years ago)
- Launched: 25 October 1997 (28 years ago)
- Founder: Marcel Skëndo; Julien Roche; Aleksandër Frangaj

Links
- Website: tvklan.al

Availability

Terrestrial
- Digital / DVB-T2

Televizioni Klan (or TV Klan) is an Albanian private television network, based in Tirana, Albania. As the first private network in the country, TV Klan began its broadcasts on 25 October 1997, and became the first to gain national coverage in 2001.

== History ==
Following a newly de-Enverized Albania, TV Klan launched on 25 October 1997 as a joint venture between Marcel Skëndo, Julien Roche and Aleksandër Frangaj, under the parent company Media 6. It is the first private TV channel in Albania.

On 1 August 1998 at 19:30, TV Klan made its first news report ever on its channel. The first chronicle of TV Klan is about the murder of Taulant Buça.

In 2001, TV Klan was granted the license for national television coverage. In 2002, ISO rated the channel as the most highly rated in Albania with 21.5% of audience share. As of 2006, the channel's analogue signal covered around 60% of Albania's territory.

TV Klan is a media group that includes Klan Plus, Radio Klan, Klan News, Klan Music, ABC News (Albania), and North Macedonia-based Klan Macedonia. The channel package is available in Europe through the pay-TV services Tring and DigitAlb.

The network is known for its long-standing political show Opinion, hosted by Blendi Fevziu; entertainment shows such as Këngët e Shekullit, Gjeniu i Vogël, Dance with Me, X Factor Albania, Kënga Ime, Zonë e Lirë, E Diela Shqiptare, Xing me Ermalin, Stop, Rudina, Aldo Morning Show; and various co-productions.

Since 4 March 2012, TV Klan has been the first national TV channel in southeastern Europe and Albania to begin broadcasting 24 hours in HD without charging additional fees to customers. It is the first station in Albania to own a satellite news gathering mobile broadcasting studio.

On 3 May 2018, TV Klan announced that it had signed an agreement to acquire Art Channel, an Albanian broadcaster in North Macedonia. The channel was re-branded with the name Klan Maqedonia (Klan Macedonia).

According to the Audiovisual Media Authority, in 2020, Radio Klan became the third privately owned radio station to receive national frequency status in Albania.

In 2022, TV Klan launched a video-on-demand streaming service called Klani Im, making its flagship channel alongside many affiliate TV and radio channels freely available to stream live on mobile devices. Each broadcast is preserved for up to seven days.

== Broadcasting outlets ==
=== Television ===
Channel	Description
TV Klan	generalist
Klan Plus	generalist, focused on entertainment, re-runs of TV Klan programming
Klan News	24-hour news channel
Klan Sport 1	sport channel; Euro 2024 & World Cup 2026
Klan Sport 2	sport channel; Euro 2024 & World Cup 2026
Klan Music	music channel primarily focused on Latin music
Klan Macedonia	generalist; original Macedonian programming and reruns of TV Klan programming
Klan Nostalgji	remastered classic films; reruns of classic TV Klan programming pre-2015

== Programs ==
=== Programs produced by TV Klan ===
Original name	Format
Opinion	Talk show
Gjeniu i vogël	Talent show
Këngët e Shekullit	Music show
Aldo Morning Show	Morning show
Musical MusiKlan	Musical talent show
100 Vjet Muzikë	Musical talent show dedicated to 100 years since Albania's independence
E Diela Shqiptare	Sunday show
Jo Vetëm Mode	Entertainment show
Takimi i Pasditës	Talk show
Euroklan	News
Kënga Magjike	Music awards
Zonë e Lirë	Talk show
Netë Vere	Summer show
X Factor Albania	Talent show
Kënga ime	Music awards
Dance With Me	Talent show
Lufta e nuseve	Reality show
Stop	Satiro-investigative show
Your Face Sounds Familiar	Reality show
Rudina	Talk show (successor to Takimi i pasditës)
Xing me Ermalin	Talk show
C'est la vie	Reality show
Virtuozët	Talentshow
Klanifornia	Comedy
Historia Ime	Talk Show
Familja	Game Show
Porta e Fatit	Game Show
Arome Dreke	Cooking
Uniko	Crime Investigation
Zemër Luana nga Luana Vjollca	Entertainment Show
Love Island Albania	Reality show
100 Këngë nga Bota	Entertainment Show
Lufta e Nuseve	Reality show

=== International TV shows broadcast by TV Klan ===
Original name	Albanian translation	Origin
Servant of the People	Shërbëtori i popullit	Ukraine
ER	Emergjenca	United States
JAG	J.A.G.	United States
Heroes	Heronjtë	United States
Third Watch	Vrojtimi i Tretë	United States
House	Dr. House	United States
Grey's Anatomy	Anatomia e Greit	United States
Lipstick Jungle	Lipstick Jungle	United States
CSI: NY	CSI: NY	United States
According to Jim	Jeta sipas Xhimit	United States
Californication	Californication	United States
Beverly Hills, 90210	Beverly Hills, 90210	United States
The Good Wife	Gruaja e mirë	United States
Law & Order: Special Victims Unit	Ligj dhe rregull: SVU	United States
Hannah Montana	Hana Montana	United States
Digimon Adventure	Aventurat e Digimonit	Japan
Shinzo	Shinzo	Japan
Yu-Gi-Oh!	Ju-Gi-Oh!	Japan
Spider Riders	Kalorësit e Merimangave	Canada
Superbook	Superlibri	United States
South Beach	South Beach	United States
Gümüş	Gymysh	Turkey
Acı Hayat	Jetë e hidhur	Turkey
Ezel	Ezel	Turkey
Kuzey Güney	Kuzej dhe Gynej	Turkey
Aşk-ı Memnu	Dashuri e ndaluar	Turkey
Son	Fundi	Turkey
Sapna Babul Ka...Bidaai	Bidaai: Lamtumirë vajzëri	India
Umutsuz Ev Kadınları	Shtëpiake të dëshpëruara	Turkey
Kurt Seyit ve Şura	Kurti dhe Shura	Turkey
Kara Para Aşk	Diamante dhe dashuri	Turkey
Amor à Vida	Duaje jetën	Brazil
A Favorita	E preferuara	Brazil
Calle luna, Calle sol	Botë të ndara	Venezuela
Diriliş: Ertuğrul	Ertugrul	Turkey
Saraswatichandra	Sarasvatiçandra	India
Paramparça	Fate të kryqëzuara	Turkey
Kaderimin Yazıldığı Gün	Një pjesë e imja	Turkey
Maral	Maral	Turkey
Iss Pyaar Ko Kya Naam Doon?	Si ta quaj këtë dashuri?	India
İntikam	Hakmarrje	Turkey
Anne	Nënë	Turkey
Cesur ve Güzel	Xhesuri dhe e bukura	Turkey
Muhteşem Yüzyıl: Kösem	Sulltanesha Kosem	Turkey
İçerde	I infiltruari	Turkey
Dil Boley Oberoi	Bixhoz me Dashurinë	India
Kalp Atışı	Rrahje zemre	Turkey
Siyah Beyaz Aşk	Dashuri Bardh e zi	Turkey
Payitaht: Abdülhamid	Kryeqyteti Abdulhamid	Turkey
Çukur	Çukur	Turkey
Ufak Tefek Cinayetler	Vrasje të Vogla	Turkey
Muhteşem İkili	Dyshja fantastike	Turkey
Segundo Sol	Një mundësi e dytë	Brazil
House of Cards	Intrigat e pushtetit	United States
Çarpışma	Ironia e fatit	Turkey
Kızım	Bija Ime	Turkey
Fauda	Fauda	Israel
Money Heist	La Casa de Papel	Spain
Narcos	Narcos (Trafikantët)	United States
Kuzgun	Kuzgun (Korbi)	Turkey
Muhteşem Yüzyıl	Sulejmani i madhërishëm	Turkey
Sen Çal Kapımı	Dashuria është në ajër	Turkey
Kırgın Çiçekler	Lule të vetmuara	Turkey
Bir Zamanlar Çukurova	Tokë e hidhur	Turkey
Aile	Familja	Turkey
Kızılcık Şerbeti	Një dashuri	Turkey
Yargı	Sekrete Familjare	Turkey
Yalı Çapkını	Çapkëni i pasur	Turkey
Kalp Yarası	Zemër e plagosur	Turkey
Rebelde	Rebelët	Mexico
Cuidado con el Angel	Kujdes nga Engjëlli	Mexico
Duy Beni	Më dëgjo	Turkey

== See also ==
- Television in Albania
- Klan Kosova, a Kosovan TV station formerly affiliated with TV Klan
- ABC News Albania, a TV station formerly affiliated with TV Klan
- Klan Macedonia
