= News 24 (Albanian TV channel) =

Albanian TV channel

- Country: Albania
- Broadcast area: Albania • Worldwide

Programming
- Picture format: 4:3 (576i, SDTV); 1080i (HDTV 16:9)

Ownership
- Owner: Focus Media Group sh.p.k.
- Sister channels: Radio News 24, 97.0 FM (Tirana), Fax News

History
- Launched: 2002; 18 August 2025 (relaunch)

Links
- Website: www.news24.al

News 24 is the first Albanian 24-hour news television channel, founded in 2002 in Tirana, Albania, by Italian journalist Carlo Bollino and former shareholder of Radio Rash, the Gazeta Shqiptare, and the BalkanWeb portal. The channel's format resembles its Italian equivalent Rai News24. The news are updated every minute.

News 24 operates the popular news portal Balkanweb. Balkanweb's videos come almost exclusively from News 24.

== History ==
The Balkanweb portal was established in February 2000 by Italian publishing company Edisud (e.g. La Gazzetta del Mezzogiorno) with funding from the Soros Foundation. It was later sold to Focus Group in 2011.

On the morning of August 9, 2025, it was forcibly taken off the air. At approximately 07:36, the channel’s broadcast went dark, replaced by vertical colored bars, following a police and bailiff operation that surrounded its headquarters in the former Autotraktor Plant in the Shkozë district of Tirana.

Authorities cited an expired lease since May 2022 and a final court ruling from July 14, 2025, ordering eviction. A March 12, 2025 government decision transferred the disputed premises to KAYO, a new state-owned arms company. Focus Media Group contested this, stating that they held valid lease documentation and that at least one property lease extended until 2033.

Media organizations, journalists’ associations, and opposition figures condemned the action as a direct assault on press freedom, highlighting the lack of prior warning, access denial, power cutoff, and signal blackout as disproportionate and undemocratic. Tirana called for the immediate lifting of the blockade and restoration of journalist access.

On August 18, 2025, ten days after the channel went off air, the channel began broadcasting from a different building. Their main headquarters remained blocked by KAYO and the police.

== Nationally created shows ==
Original name	Format	Origin
Vetting/TakFak	Investigative shows	Albania
Autoktonët	Cultural show	Albania
Dola te Ola	Entertainment show	Albania
Vila 24	Talk show	Albania
Fit Station	Talk show	Albania
Log	Talk show	Albania
Kjo Jave	Talk show	Albania
Medicus	Talk show	Albania
Koha për t'u zgjuar	Morning show	Albania
Me Zemër të Hapur	Talk show	Albania
Në shënjestër	Talk show	Albania
Sport News	Talk show	Albania

== See also ==
- Television in Albania
