= Paskuqan =

- Administrative unit
- Location within Albania
- Coordinates: 41°22′N 19°49′E
- Country: Albania
- County: Tiranë
- Municipality: Kamëz
  - Administrative unit: 11.51 km^{2} (4.44 sq mi)
- Elevation: 143.33 m (470.2 ft)

Population (2023)
  - Administrative unit: 34,398
  - Administrative unit density: 2,989/km^{2} (7,740/sq mi)
- Time zone: UTC+1 (CET)
  - Summer (DST): UTC+2 (CEST)
- Postal Code: 1047

Paskuqan is a city and a municipal unit in Tirana County, central Albania. At the 2015 local government reform it became a municipal unit of the municipality of Kamëz. The population as of the 2023 census is 34,398.

Historical population
Year	Pop.	±%
1989	3,472	—
2001	21,055	+506.4%
2011	37,349	+77.4%
2023	34,398	−7.9%
