= List of national newspapers =

This is a list of national newspapers, i.e. those that circulate throughout the whole country, contrasted with local newspapers serving a city or region. National newspapers on this list also include metropolitan newspapers with expanded distribution networks.

== Albania ==
- Agon
- Gazeta Shqip
- Gazeta Shqiptare
- Gazeta Sot
- Gazeta Tema
- Koha Jonë
- Metropol
- Panorama
- Rilindja Demokratike
- Shekulli
- Sporti Shqiptar
- Telegrafi
- Zëri i Popullit

== Australia ==
- Australian Financial Review
- The Australian
- The Sydney Morning Herald
- The Saturday Paper

== Canada ==
- National Post
- The Globe and Mail

== France ==
- La Croix
- Les Echos
- L'Équipe
- Le Figaro
- L'Humanité
- Libération
- Le Monde
- Le Parisien/Aujourd'hui en France
- La Tribune

== Germany ==
- Bild
- Frankfurter Allgemeine Zeitung
- Handelsblatt
- Süddeutsche Zeitung
- Die Tageszeitung
- Die Welt
- Neues Deutschland
- Der Tagesspiegel

== Haiti ==
- Balistrad
- Le Nouvelliste
- Le Matin

== India ==
- Dainik Jagran
- The Hindu
- Hindustan
- Hindustan Times
- The Telegraph
- The Times of India
- Navbharat Times

== Iran ==
- Kayhan
- Ettela'at
- Islamic Republican

== Ireland ==
- Business Post
- Irish Independent
- The Irish Times
- The Irish Examiner

== Israel ==
- Yedioth Ahronot
- Israel Hayom
- Haaretz

== Japan ==
- The Asahi Shimbun
- Mainichi Shimbun
- The Nikkei
- Sankei Shimbun
- Yomiuri Shimbun

== Kenya ==
- Daily Nation
- The Standard

== Mexico ==
- El Economista
- Excélsior
- El Heraldo de México
- La Jornada
- Milenio
- La Prensa
- Reforma
- El Universal

== Nepal ==
- The Annapurna Express
- Gorkhapatra
- The Himalayan Times
- Kantipur
- The Kathmandu Post
- Nagarik
- Nepali Times
- The Rising Nepal

== Netherlands ==
- Algemeen Dagblad
- Het Financieele Dagblad
- Nederlands Dagblad
- NRC Handelsblad
- Reformatorisch Dagblad
- De Telegraaf
- Trouw
- De Volkskrant

== Pakistan ==
- Daily Pakistan
- Dawn
- The Express Tribune
- The News International
- Pakistan Observer

== Philippines ==
- Manila Bulletin
- Manila Standard
- The Manila Times
- Philippine Daily Inquirer
- The Philippine Star

== Poland ==
- Dziennik Polska-Europa-Świat
- Fakt
- Gazeta Wyborcza
- Przegląd Sportowy
- Puls Biznesu
- Rzeczpospolita
- Super Express
- Trybuna

== Serbia ==
- Delo
- Glas Srpske
- Nova Makedonija
- Oslobođenje
- Pobjeda
- Politika
- Večernje novosti
- Vjesnik

== Singapore ==
- The Straits Times
- The Business Times

== Taiwan ==
- Apple Daily
- Liberty Times
- Taipei Times
- Taiwan News
- Taiwan Times

== Thailand ==
- Bangkok Post
- Daily News
- Khaosod
- Matichon
- Siam Rath
- Thai Post
- Thairath

== Timor-Leste ==
- Suara Timor Lorosae
- Tatoli

== United Kingdom ==
- Daily Express
- Daily Mail
- Daily Mirror
- The Daily Telegraph
- The Guardian
- The Independent
- Evening Standard
- Metro
- The Observer
- The Sun
- The Times
- The i
- The Financial Times

== United States ==
- The New York Times
- USA Today
- The Wall Street Journal
- The Washington Post

== See also ==
- Lists of newspapers
