= List of newspapers in Albania =

The number of newspapers in Albania was nearly 92 in 2001 and 98 in 2002.

Below is a list of newspapers in Albania.

== Albanian language ==
- ABC
- Agon
- Albania
- Bashkimi
- Bujuka
- Ekonomia
- Gazeta e pavarur
- Fjala e Tokësorit
- Flaka e Vëllazërimit
- Festival
- Gazeta 55
- Gazeta Shqiptare
- Gazeta Sot
- Gazeta Telegram
- Gazeta Telegraf
- Insajderi
- Koha Jonë
- Kombetare
- Korrieri
- Libertas
- Lunxhëria
- Mesazhieri
- Metropol
- Panorama
- Reporteri
- Rilindja Demokratike
- Rimëkëmbja
- Shekulli
- Shqip
- Shqiperia Online
- Shqiptarja.com
- Gazeta Sportive
- Sporti shqiptar
- Standard
- Tema
- Zëri i Popullit
- Gazeta Balkan
- Gazeta Mapo
- Gazeta Dita
- Gazeta e pavarur
- Gazeta Sport Ekspres
- Gazeta Telegraf
- Gazeta Shendeti
- Gazeta Intervista
- Gazeta Celesi

== Online news portals ==
Albanian Daily www.albaniandaily.com

- https://argjirolajm.net/
- www.shqip.com
- www.balkanweb.com
- www.syri.net
- www.reporter.al
- www.respublica.al
- www.lapsi.al
- www.lajme.al
- www.lajmifundit.al
- www.reporteri.al
- www.telegram.al
- www.telegrafi.com
- Gazeta e pavarur www.epavarur.com
- www.javanews.al
- www.albeu.com
- www.cna.al
- www.newsbomb.al
- www.dritare.net
- www.24-ore.com
- www.360grade.al
- www.eduasportin.com
- www.gazetaexpress.com
- www.boldnews.al
- www.droni.al
- www.gazetasportive.al
- https://indeks.al

== English language ==
- Albanian Mail
- NOA
- Tirana Times
- Albania Daily news

== Greek language ==
- Dimotiki Foni
- Dris
- Foni tis Omonoias
- Laiko Vima
- Provoli
- Romiosini

== Multilingual ==
- Gazeta 2000 (Greek, Albanian, English)
- Gazette.al - Shqipëri Gazette (English, Albanian)

== See also ==
- List of magazines in Albania
- List of Web Portals in Albania
