= News in Albania =

Albania's news industry covers the press, television and radio.

The Albanian national news agency is the Albanian Telegraphic Agency (ATA), which uses the English language, as well as the Albanian language.

== The press ==
=== Newspapers ===
The following newspapers are most published in Albania:

Albanian Name	English name	Established	Political alignment	Frequency	Circulation (in 2001)	Remarks
Albania	Albania	08-09-1995	Unaffiliated center		Unknown	
Shekulli	Century	May 12, 1999	Unaffiliated center left	Daily	22,167	
Gazeta Shqiptare	Albanian Newspaper		Left	Daily	9,677	
Korrieri	Courier	March 28, 2001	Unaffiliated center left	Daily	8,000	
Koha Jonë	Our Time	May 11, 1991	Right winged, Liberal	Daily	7,833	
Rilindja Demokratike	Democratic reborn	January 5, 1991	Democratic Party	Daily	5,333	This Newspaper is part of Democratic Party of Albania
Zëri i Popullit	Voice of the People	1944	Marxism-Leninism, now Social democracy	Daily	5,167	This Newspaper was first part of Party of Labour of Albania (1944–1992) and now Socialist Party of Albania (1992–present)
Tema	Theme		Unaffiliated right	Daily	5,000	
Republika	Republik		Republican Party	Daily	5,000	Part of Republican Party of Albania
Gazeta 55	Newspaper 55	October 18, 1997	Anti-communist, Liberal	Daily	4,500	

=== Private newspapers ===
- Gazeta Shqiptare (daily)
- Koha Jonë (daily)
- Korrieri (daily)
- Panorama (daily)
- Shekulli (daily)
- Shqip (daily)
- Gazeta 55 (daily)

=== Political newspapers ===
- Rilindja Demokratike (Democratic Party)
- Zeri i Popullit (Socialist Party)

=== Websites ===
- A2 News | CNN Exclusive News Channel Affiliate (Albanian language)
- Albanian Daily News (English language)
- Balkan Web (Albanian language)
- NOA Agency (Albanian language, English language, Italian language and Greek language)
- ATA (Albanian Telegraphic Agency, English language, Albanian language and French language)
- Lezha Online (Lezha Online News, Albanian language)
- Kombetare Online (Gazeta Kombetare Online, Albanian language)
- AlbNews Portal (Latest news from Albania, Kosovo and Macedonia)
- Albania Journal (Latest news from Albania, English Language)

== Television ==
Albania has four television networks:

=== Public ===
- Albanian Radio Television (RTSH) (Public broadcaster that operates two networks)

=== Private ===
- Top-Channel (Private network)
- TVA (Private network)
- TV Klan (Private network)

== Radio ==
Albania has three radio networks:

=== Public ===
- Radio Tirana (RTSH) (Public broadcaster)

=== Private ===
- +2 Radio
- Top Albania Radio
