= 101.6 FM =

FM radio frequency

This is a list of radio stations that broadcast on FM frequency 101.6 MHz:

== Albania ==
- Plus 2 Radio, a national private radio station operating in Albania

== Bangladesh ==
Coloursfm 101.6

== Bulgaria ==
- Horizont (radio station), a state-owned Bulgarian Radio Station

== Cyprus ==
- Logos Radio

== Finland ==
- Radio KLF a radio station based in Helsinki

== France ==
- France Bleu the regional radio network of Radio France

== Greece ==
- Eleftheri Radiofonas Krestena
- Tik Tower Radio 101.4 FM

== Indonesia ==
- ZOO FM Batam
- USM Jaya FM Semarang

== Latvia ==
- AlisePlus

== Republic of Ireland ==
- West Limerick 102 a community radio station broadcasting to the western parts of County Limerick in Ireland

== Malaysia ==
- My in Kuala Terengganu, Terengganu
- Mix in Kota Kinabalu, Sabah

== New Zealand ==
- Radio New Zealand National a publicly funded non-commercial New Zealand English language radio network operated by Radio New Zealand

== United Arab Emirates ==
- City FM 101.6

== United Kingdom ==
- Asian Star
- Classic FM (UK) one of the United Kingdom's three Independent National Radio stations
- Greatest Hits Radio Surrey & North Hampshire in Four Marks and Hindhead
- KMFM West Kent an Independent Local Radio serving the towns of Sevenoaks, Tonbridge, Royal Tunbridge Wells and the surrounding areas in Kent, South East England
- Capital Mid-Counties, launched on June 6, 1998, serving Burton, Litchfield, Tamworth and South Derbyshire
