= Sokol Shameti =

Albanian writer and journalist (born 1978)

Sokol Shameti (born 29 April 1978) is an Albanian columnist, writer and journalist. Much of his interest is concerned with Politics of Albania, political philosophy and the late modern and contemporary history of the Balkans. His work is concerned with the social and political debate in Albania and Kosovo. He is often mentioned among the left activists in Albania. Sokol Shameti has collaborated with a number of newspapers and broadcasting operators in Albania and abroad including Gazeta Shqiptare, Koha Jonë, Korrieri, Klan Television, Top Channel, Institute for War and Peace Reporting, La Gazzetta del Mezzogiorno, Courrier International, Koha Ditore, etc.

== Bibliography ==
- Udherrefyes i Reportazhit Shqiptar (Anthology of Albanian Feature Story) (Impact Center Publications, 2011) ISBN 978-9928-4089-0-7

https://www.scribd.com/doc/109810484/Sokol-Shameti-Udherrefyes-i-reportazhit-shqiptar-1912-2011-Antology-of-Albanian-feature-story-1912-2011
