= List of newspapers in Timor-Leste =

Timor-Leste has a rich print media environment, with several daily newspapers and a number of weekly publications. The oldest and most widely-read newspaper in the country is Suara Timor Lorosae, which originated in 1993 as Suara Timor Timur during the Indonesian occupation period and relaunched with its current name in 2000. Other major dailies include the Independente, Timor Post, and Jornal Nacional Diário. A state-run news agency, Tatoli, was launched in 2016. Newspapers are concentrated in Dili, the capital, and are mostly published in the Tetun language, with English, Indonesian, and Portuguese also appearing in print.

== Newspapers ==
Newspaper	Founded	Location	Ownership	Circulation	Type	Language(s)	Ref.
Business Timor		Bali, Indonesia	Private	1,000 (2010)	Weekly	Tetun	
Diário Tempo		Dili	Private	500 (2013)	Daily		
Diáriu Timoroman	c. 2010s		Private		Daily	Tetun, Indonesian, Portuguese	
Dili Post		Dili	Private		Daily		
The Dili Weekly	2007	Dili	Private	1,000 (2010)	Online weekly	Tetun, English	
Independente	2011	Dili	Private		Daily	Tetun, English, Indonesian, Portuguese	
Jornal Nacional Diário	2005	Dili	Private	1,650 (2010)	Daily	Tetun, Portuguese, Indonesian	
Jornal Nacional Semanário	2003	Dili	Private	2,000 (2008)	Weekly	Tetun, Portuguese	
The Oekusi Post	2020		Private		Online	Tetun, English, Indonesian	
Suara Timor Lorosae	1993	Dili	Private	2,000 (2013)	Daily	Tetun, English, Indonesian, Portuguese	
Tatoli	2016	Dili	Government		Online daily	Tetun, English, Indonesian, Portuguese	
Tempo Semanal		Dili	Private	500 (2013)	Weekly	Tetun, English, Indonesian, Portuguese	
Timor Post	2000	Dili	Private	700 (2024)	Daily	Tetun, English, Indonesian, Portuguese	

== Defunct newspapers ==
Newspaper	Founded	Ceased	Location	Ownership	Circulation	Type	Language(s)	Ref.
A Voz de Timor	1959	1975	Dili	Government		Weekly	Portuguese	
Diário Tempo		2005		Private		Daily	Tetun, English, Indonesian	
Dili Times	1999	2000	Darwin, Australia	Private		Monthly	English	
Dili Post	1982		Dili	Private		Weekly		
Kla'ak Semanál	c. 2008	c. 2009	Dili	Private		Weekly	Tetun	
Kroat	2010		Baucau	Private	500 (2010)	Daily		
Lalenok	2000		Dili	Private	900 (2000)	Weekly	Tetun	
Lia Foun	2005	2005	Dili	Private		Weekly	Tetun, Portuguese	
Lian Maubere				Private		Weekly	Indonesian	
Lifau Pos	2003		Dili	Private	500 (2008)	Weekly	Tetun, Baikenu, Indonesian	
New East Timor (Note: Published in Tetun as Timor Lorosae Foun and in Indonesian as Timor Timur Baru)	1999	2000	Dili	INTERFET		Weekly	Tetun, English, Indonesian	
Tais Timor	2000	2002	Darwin, Australia	UNTAET	50,000 (2002)	Monthly	Tetun, English, Indonesian, Portuguese	
Talit@kum	1998	2003	Dili	Private		Biweekly	Indonesian	
Timor	1938	1939	Dili				Portuguese	
Timor Sun	2002		Dili	Private	1,000 (2008)	Weekly	English, Indonesian	
Vox Populi	c. 1999			Private		Weekly	Tetun, Indonesian	

== See also ==
- Jornal da República, government gazette
- Freedom of the press in Timor-Leste
- Lists of newspapers

== Notes and references ==
Footnotes
