= Andrea Stefani =

Andrea Stefani may refer to:

- Andrea Stefani (journalist)
- Andrea Stefani (composer)
