= Mero Baze =

Albanian journalist

- Born: Peshtan, Tepelenë, Albania
- Education: University of Tirana
- Occupations: Journalist, columnist
- Known for: Founder and editor of Tema newspaper

Mero Baze is an Albanian journalist and columnist. He is the founder and editor of the daily newspaper Tema and has been an active figure in Albanian media since the early 1990s. Baze is known for his political commentary and investigative reporting.

== Early life and education ==
Baze studied engineering at the University of Tirana in the early 1990s. During his time as a student, he contributed to the newspaper Studenti and participated in the early stages of Albania's post-communist press.

== Career ==
In 1992, Baze was appointed Director of News at the Albanian Telegraphic Agency (ATA). In August-November 1993 Baze was demoted and later fired from the ATA after publicly criticizing the agency’s politicization by disputing an anti-BBC statement issued by ATA's director Ilir Zhilla in the name of ATA journalists without their consent. Assistant editor Faruk Myrtaj, the only person at the agency who protested Baze’s dismissal, was also fired.

He later served as Chair of the Albanian Journalists' Association.

From 1993 to 1995, Baze worked as a political commentator for the Kosovo-based newspaper Rilindja and as a correspondent for Voice of America. His reporting included coverage of the 1997 unrest in Albania and an interview with imprisoned Socialist Party leader Fatos Nano.

In 1997, Baze founded a private news agency, Enter, which operated during the period of political crisis. That same year, he published Realitete shqiptaro-amerikane, a book focused on Albanian-American relations.

He became a correspondent for Radio Free Europe in 1999, covering the conflict in Kosovo and the Rambouillet Conference. His publications from that period include Shqipëria dhe lufta në Kosovë and Rambuje, Mosmarrëveshjet për paqe.

== Tema newspaper ==
In July 1999, Baze founded the newspaper Tema, which became a daily in September 2000. Initially critical of the Socialist Party, the newspaper later adopted a more oppositional stance toward the Democratic Party, particularly during the administration of Sali Berisha.

Baze's editorial work, including the satirical column "Antena", has received both support and criticism. In 2008, he published Përballja me antiopozitarizmin, a collection of political essays.

In the same year, he began hosting the talk show Faktor Plus on Vizion Plus.

== Publications ==
- Kthim grek (1995) – Essays
- Realitete shqiptaro-amerikane (1997) – Essays
- Shqipëria dhe lufta në Kosovë (1998)
- Përballja me antiopozitarizmin (2008)
- Viti '97: Prapaskenat e krizës që rrënuan shtetin (2010)
- Rambuje mosmarrëveshja për paqe (2000)
- Jug (2014) – Poetry
- Kryeministri i padukshëm (2016) – Political essays
- Rrëfimi i një anti-Berishisti (2018) – Memoir and commentary
- Njeriu që vuri dinamitin (2020) – Investigative narrative
- A ka zgjidhje? (2011)
- Të gjithë na qeshin (2013)
- Parandjenja e vdekjes (2015)
- Kriza e Republikës (2017)
- Republika e parë: historia politike e Kosovës 1989-1999 (2022)

== Legal issues ==
In December 2008, Baze's car was set on fire and exploded outside his apartment building in Tirana. He described the incident as a serious act of intimidation related to his journalism. The Union of Albanian Journalists condemned the attack, while the opposition Socialist Party considered it a dramatic development in the ongoing conflict between Prime Minister Sali Berisha and critical media voices.

In 2005, during the rerun elections in the southern city of Gjirokastër, Baze and fellow journalist Astrit Patozi were physically assaulted by Gjolek Malaj, a relative of a senior Socialist Party official. The attack took place near a polling station in front of police officers who reportedly failed to intervene and instead protected the attackers. The Ministry of Public Order dismissed four police officers for negligence, and the case was sent to the prosecutor general’s office. Malaj was later convicted and sentenced to four months in prison. Baze described the attack as a symptom of criminal elements infiltrating the police, threatening the democratic process.

In 2011, Tema was evicted from a state-owned building, despite having signed a 20-year lease in 2009. That same year, Baze was physically assaulted by businessman Rezart Taçi after publishing reports on the contested privatization of the ARMO oil refineries and accusations of tax evasion.

== Personal life ==
Baze is married and has two children. Though trained as an engineer, he has worked full-time in journalism since the early 1990s.
