= Andrea Stefani (journalist) =

Albanian journalist (1958–2016)

- Born: December 8, 1958; Tirana, PR Albania
- Died: December 3, 2016 (aged 57); Tirana, Albania
- Occupations: Journalist, columnist, activist
- Known for: Founder of Shekulli newspaper; host of investigative program Hapur
- Notable work: Albanistan (2005), Komploti kundër lirisë (2011)

Andrea Stefani (8 December 1958 – 3 December 2016) was an Albanian journalist, columnist, and civic activist. For around two decades, he worked with various Albanian media outlets and became known for his critical viewpoints toward different governments.

== Career ==
Stefani began his journalism career in 1989 at the newspaper Puna. He then worked as a freelance journalist, and by 1993 was part of the founding team of Gazeta Shqiptare. Later, he joined Rilindja, a Kosovo-based newspaper published in Tirana.

He was the founding editor-in-chief of the daily newspaper Shekulli, one of the first independent newspapers in post-communist Albania. He later hosted the investigative television program Hapur, which focused on exposing corruption and abuse of power. Throughout his career, Stefani also worked for the newspapers Shqip and Dita.

For more than ten years, he was a regular participant in weekly political debate programs on Albanian television.

== Publications ==
Stefani was the author of the publicist book Albanistan, published in 2005, and the book Komploti kundër lirisë – Shqipëria nga diktatura në demokracinë bolshevike (2011).

== Death ==
He died on 3 December 2016 at the age of 57.
