= Etjen Xhafaj =

Albanian politician and public administrator (born 1982)

Administrator of Albanian Post
- Incumbent
- Assumed office 29 October 2025
- Preceded by: Ardit Demiri

Member of the Albanian Parliament
- In office September 2021 – June 2025
- Constituency: Tirana County

Deputy Minister of Infrastructure and Energy
- In office 2019–2020

Deputy Minister of Europe and Foreign Affairs
- In office 2017–2019

Personal details
- Born: 6 April 1982 (age 44) Vlorë, PSR Albania
- Party: Socialist Party of Albania
- Education: Schiller International University; Harvard Kennedy School
- Profession: Politician, public administrator

Etjen Xhafaj (born 6 April 1982) is an Albanian politician and public administrator. Since October 2025, he has served as Administrator of Albanian Post. He was previously a Member of the Parliament of Albania representing Tirana County, and has held several deputy ministerial positions.

== Early life and education ==
Xhafaj was born in Vlorë on 6 April 1982. He completed primary and secondary education in Vlorë and Tirana, later attending Southwestern Academy in California, United States. He obtained a degree in International Relations and Diplomacy from Schiller International University, completing studies in Philadelphia and at the university's Paris campus. In 2016, he earned a Master of Public Administration from the Harvard Kennedy School.

== Career ==
After returning to Albania, Xhafaj worked with the Financial Services Volunteer Corps, a USAID-supported program focused on financial sector reform. From 2006 to 2013 he contributed as a columnist to Albanian Daily News and other national media.

In 2013, he joined the Ministry of Economic Development, Trade and Entrepreneurship, serving first as adviser and later as Director of Cabinet. Following graduate studies in the United States, he became Director of Cabinet at the Ministry of Finance in 2016.

Between 2017 and 2020, Xhafaj served as Deputy Minister in two consecutive portfolios: the Ministry for Europe and Foreign Affairs and the Ministry of Infrastructure and Energy.

He was elected to the Parliament of Albania in June 2021 as a representative of the Socialist Party of Albania for Tirana County. Within parliament he has participated in the Committee on Foreign Policy and the Committee on European Integration. In 2021, he was also appointed Secretary for Digital Affairs within the Socialist Party’s leadership structure.

On 29 October 2025, Xhafaj was appointed Administrator of Albanian Post, the state-owned national postal service.
