= KLF =

KLF may refer to:

- The KLF, a British electronic band
- Karachi Literature Festival, held annually in Pakistan
- Kenya Lacrosse Federation
- Kerala Literature Festival, held annually in India
- Kerry-Lynne Findlay, Canadian politician
- Krüppel-like factors, proteins regulating gene expression
- Radio KLF, Finland
- Khalistan Liberation Force, Khalistani separatist militant organization
- Kaluga Airport IATA code
- Kunlun Fight, a Chinese kickboxing promotion
