= Human rights in Timor-Leste =

Timor-Leste (formerly East Timor) is a multiparty parliamentary republic with a population of approximately 1.1 million, sharing the island of Timor with Indonesia's East Nusa Tenggara province. During the 24 years of Indonesian occupation (from 1975,) and after the 1999 independence referendum, pro Indonesian militias committed many human rights violations. The country gained independence in 2002, and free and fair elections were held in 2007. The United Nations Integrated Mission in East Timor (UNMIT) and the International Stabilization Force remain in the country while it develops its own security forces, the National Police (PNTL) and Defence Forces (F-FDTL).

There are a number of issues concerning civil and political rights including breaches of the right to a fair trial and freedom from arbitrary arrest. The delivery of economic, social and cultural rights is also a concern, such as the right to education, and the right to family life; there is little respect for the rights of women and children and domestic violence and sexual abuse are major problems.

== International treaties ==
Timor-Leste joined the United Nations (UN) in 2002 and is a party to seven of the nine core human rights treaties: the International Convention on the Elimination of All Forms of Racial Discrimination (ICERD), International Covenant on Civil and Political Rights (ICCPR), International Covenant on Economic, Social and Cultural Rights (ICESCR), Convention on the Elimination of All Forms of Discrimination against Women (CEDAW), Convention against Torture and Other Cruel, Inhuman or Degrading Treatment or Punishment (CAT)) and International Convention on the Protection of the Rights of All Migrant Workers and Members of Their Families (ICRMW)). It has not ratified the International Convention for the Protection of All Persons from Enforced Disappearance (CED) or the Convention on the Rights of Persons with Disabilities (CRPD)). Its first Universal Periodic Review was held in October 2011.

Timor-Leste has ratified optional protocols of international treaties, including the First Optional Protocol to the International Covenant on Civil and Political Rights, the Second Optional Protocol to the International Covenant on Civil and Political Rights, and the Optional Protocol on the Involvement of Children in Armed Conflict and Optional Protocol on the Sale of Children, Child Prostitution and Child Pornography of the Convention on the Rights of the Child.

== Constitutional protections ==
The constitution enacted in 2002 is comprehensive, however more systems need to be put in place before the rights detailed in the constitution can be said to be guaranteed, for example the right to private property, health, and education is still not realised for many, and there is inefficient delivery of the right to a hearing and defence, free consent to marriage, and freedom to assemble, as detailed below.

== Failures of justice ==
The country's inefficient legal system has raised human rights concerns. In 2010, the country was reported to have issues with lack of fair trials, the use of excessive force by police, and a pervading sense of impunity for past human rights breaches.

The judicial system suffers from a lack of staffing and resources, thus even though the law prohibits arbitrary arrest and detention, incarceration may occur because judges are unavailable, and there are long delays until people are heard at trial. There are also significant comprehension difficulties as although Tetum and Portuguese are both official languages of Timor-Leste, Portuguese is the main legal language, which most of the population does not speak.

There have also been reports of the police and defence force breaching the rights of civilians through cruel or degrading treatment such as beatings, excessive use of force, intimidation and threats made at gunpoint. Allegations of prison guards mistreating prisoners have also been made.

Fighting between the police and defence force led to violent riots in 2006 resulting in civilian displacement and deaths. Additionally, in 2008 the commander of the Military Police, Alfredo Reinado, led an armed attack on the Prime Minister and President, leading to a state of emergency being declared and necessitating the creation of a Joint Command in order to stem the violence and human rights violations. However, significantly, the President commuted the sentences of those responsible for the 2006 riots, and pardons were given to those involved with the 2008 violence, creating a perception of impunity, and the subsequent vetting process has not resulted in any dismissals for past human rights violations. Training programmes have resulted in some improvements, although allegations of human rights violations by the police and military continue to be made.

Furthermore, reconciliation with Indonesia has been pursued rather than focusing on criminal prosecutions for crimes committed during the 1975-1999 occupation. The Commission for Reception, Truth and Reconciliation in East Timor (Comissão de Acolhimento, Verdade e Reconciliação), and the Commission of Truth and Friendship merely brought the truth to the fore rather than seeking prosecution for crimes including unlawful killings, enforced disappearances, sexual violence, torture, and war crimes. However José Ramos-Horta has accused "the UN of "hypocrisy" for using his government's stance on justice as a pretext for not setting up the tribunal. The Serious Crimes Investigation Team continues to investigate violations committed in 1999.

== Freedom of expression ==
In Timor-Leste freedom of speech and freedom of the press are protected by law, and this is generally respected by the government. There is also an active independent media operating mainly through television and radio, although there is limited access to televisions and radios, and reception problems limit broadcasting outside of Dili and the district capitals.

== Freedom of assembly ==
East Timorese law requires that four days' notice be given to the police before any demonstrations or strikes, and demonstrations are barred within 100 yards of government buildings or diplomatic facilities. However, in practice demonstrations are allowed without the advanced notifications, and the 100 yard regulation is rarely enforced.

== Political participation ==
=== Constitutional context ===
Rights to political participation are stated in article 25 of the International Covenant on Civil and Political Rights which guarantees rights to take part in public affairs, free and universal suffrage, and generally equal access to public service roles.

These rights are largely upheld in Timor-Leste. Section 46 of the Constitution of Timor-Leste states that "every citizen has the right to participate in the political life and in the public affairs of the country"; that every "citizen has the right to establish and to participate in political parties"; and that "the establishment and organisation of such parties shall be regulated by law." Section 47 guarantees that every citizen above the age of seventeen has the right to vote and be elected. and section 48 guarantees the right of citizens to submit "petitions, complaints and claims" to authorities.

The 2017 election was contested by 21 parties. Voter turnout was high, with 77 percent of Timorese voting compared to 74 percent in 2012, and 80 percent in 2007. Elections are held under a party-list proportional representation system, in which voters select parties rather than individual candidates, a system that gives substantial power to party leaders. The electoral threshold is 4%, meaning that political parties need at least 4 percent of the vote to enter parliament. This limits the power of some minor parties.

The system is supportive of female participation and there is a requirement for one third of a party's candidates to be women, resulting in Timor-Leste having one of the highest percentages of female MPs in the Asia Pacific region (38 percent prior to the 2017 election). However, meaningful participation by women is sometimes constrained by traditional attitudes and stereotypes, particularly in local and regional roles.

There are no legal constraints on participation by the country's few ethnic minority groups and they appear to be well integrated into the political system, although the total number positions held by ethnic minorities is uncertain since self-identification of ethnicity is an uncommon practice.

The Economist Intelligence Unit's Democracy Index rates Timor-Leste consistently between 7.22 and 7.24 between 2008 and 2016, on a scale where 0 indicates a fully authoritarian regime and 10 indicates a perfect democracy. This rating is the highest in the South Pacific and is close to that of major democracies such as the United States (7.98) and France (7.92).

=== Limitations ===
Limitations on political participation in Timor-Leste are largely practical, as many areas of the country are hard to access due to geographical constraints and poor levels of roading infrastructure which can impact the ability of those in more remote areas to participate in elections. This has limited the ability of smaller parties to compete in some areas, as the better funded CNRT and Fretilin are more able to transport their supporters to polling stations.

There is also a risk that political participation will decline due to the relative lack of progress in dealing with continuous domestic challenges and the lack of decentralisation to promote self-governance and self reliance, although so far this has not had a major impact.

The convention of large political coalitions has also been identified as a potential risk to the health of Timor-Leste's democracy. Dr Michael Leach observes that since 2012, the two largest parties in government (the CNRT and Fretilin) have been in a 'grand coalition', a remarkable development since prior to the agreement, there were bitter tensions between the two parties. He notes that this recent trend towards coalitions is the result of a strong desire by Timorese politicians to facilitate stability after the instability and violence of previous years, although he also observes that such coalitions can risk undermining the accountability of the government due to the absence of a major opposition outside of government. In 2015 Francisco Guterres (the Fretilin candidate) was endorsed by prime minister Xanana Gusmão, his erstwhile rival, and won with over 60 percent of the vote, showing that a large proportion of voters currently prefer the power sharing arrangement, despite its drawbacks.

The generational divide within government roles may pose a significant challenge in the next few years. While posts such as the prime minister and chief justice are held by the younger generation, it appears that the veterans of the "1975 generation" retain most of the power behind the scenes, limiting the effectiveness of later generations to influence political society. Leach predicts this will gradually change in future elections as a greater proportion of voters come from generations with no experience of the struggle for independence.

The relative ineffectiveness of the Timorese judiciary in promoting and upholding rights has led to many citizens and civil society seeking other methods to realise their rights and political participation through lobbying has become more common due to its effectiveness in achieving results, although this depends on the priorities of the politicians involved.

== Land rights ==
=== Constitutional context ===
Land issues are currently the third largest source of complaints to the PDJH, Timor-Leste's national human rights institution. Until 1 June 2017 there was no overarching land law to regulate such issues. Article 54 of the Constitution of Timor-Leste guarantees the right to private property. It also states that private property should not be used to the detriment of its social purpose, that only national citizens have the right to ownership of land, and that "requisitioning and expropriation of property for public purposes shall only take place following fair compensation in accordance with the law". In practice, however, these protections have not always been implemented. While a specific right to land is not codified in international law, the issues involved cut across many rights. In Timor-Leste these include non-discrimination, women's rights, rights to housing, and the right to work (due to the heavy reliance on agriculture).

=== Current issues ===
Land issues are complicated by the legacy of the Portuguese and Indonesian occupations in the years prior to independence. During both regimes, land was confiscated from its traditional owners by force and consolidated into the hands of loyalists, a policy that created substantial ethnic and regional divisions. When the Indonesian military withdrew from the country in 1999, the military and affiliated militia groups destroyed an estimated 70 per cent of existing structures and took the country's land records with them, resulting in a situation where many are without title to the land they live on. High levels of population displacement as a result of the violence have further complicated matters. While a 2016 survey found that 87 per cent of residents in Dili considered themselves the owners of the land where they lived, only just over half of respondents said they had legal title to it. The problem is even more severe in the countryside, where many hold land only through customary and informal systems, systems that have no legal recognition. Resource and staffing constraints have also resulted in a substantial backlog in the courts, making it difficult to seek a legal remedy and there have been reported cases of abuse from the security services in conducting evictions. According to this survey, despite high levels of perceived ownership, the majority of households in Dili fear to varying degrees that they will be evicted in five years.

Government land acquisitions for development projects, particularly in the Oecusse and Suia districts, have been heavily criticised by NGOs, particularly for disregarding many private claims and evicting residents from land where the title is unclear. Prior to the 2017 law, government policy did not provide compensation for confiscated land that the occupier did not have title to. While this policy was not always maintained in practice, compensation in any case has been inconsistent and some Suai communities have complained that the alternative housing provided by the government did not meet their needs and the resulting relocations significantly changed their lives and cultural practices.

These practices risk breaching Timor Leste's obligations under the International Covenant on Economic, Social, and Cultural Rights and the International Covenant on Civil and Political Rights, both of which it has ratified. Article 11.1 of the ICESCR states that “everyone has the right to an adequate standard of living for himself and his family, including food, housing and water”, whilst Article 17.1 of the ICCPR states that “everyone has the right not to be subjected to arbitrary or unlawful interference with his or her privacy, family, home, or correspondence”. However, the U.S. Department of State notes that the Timorese government typically prefers to prioritise matters of perceived national importance over those of human rights and while some action has been taken to prosecute those involved in abuses, public perceptions of impunity persist.

There were four recommendations from other countries regarding land issues in Timor Leste's 2016 Universal Periodic Review. There were three recommendations to take measures to eliminate gender discrimination and women's rights to land ownership while Indonesia recommended the completion of statutes to protect human rights including land. Timor-Leste accepted three recommendations and noted Canada's recommendation to remove discriminatory provisions from legislation.

=== Reforms ===
The Timorese government has acknowledged the need for reform. In its 2016 report as part of the Universal Periodic Review, it acknowledged that the right to property is enshrined in Article 54.1 of the Constitution. Furthermore, the Government affirmed its intentions to continue the development of a land law package to protect these rights and the creation of a real estate fund, in part to provide appropriate compensation for land acquisition.

On 6 February 2017 the National Parliament of Timor-Leste unanimously approved the Special Regime for the Ownership of Immovable Property, more commonly known as the 'Land Law', and it was officially enacted on the 1 June 2017. The purpose of the law is “to clarify the legal status of land ownership by bringing into effect the different dimensions of the right to private property provided for in the Constitution of Timor-Leste”. It also provides criteria for the resolution of ownership disputes and will create a National Land Registry to manage property titles. As of September 2017, there have been no major reports on the effectiveness of the law in achieving these objectives.

== Women's rights ==
In Timor-Leste, women are often deemed to have a lesser status than men, despite the constitution guaranteeing equality. Both Portugal and Indonesia in their role as colonists created and maintained traditional patriarchal social structures, marginalising women. Girls are only sent to school for a few years, and young girls are sometimes forced into arranged marriages. Furthermore, in some regions tradition prevents women from inheriting or owning property, despite the right being guaranteed in the constitution.

Sexual and domestic violence is also one of the major human rights concerns in the country. The Vulnerable Person's Unit within the PNTL is responsible for receiving and investigating allegations of sexual violence, however investigations are often delayed due to a lack of resources and institutional support, and cases are often resolved through traditional dispute resolution mechanisms, which do not provide full redress to victims. A continuing effort on behalf of the government, the UN, and non-governmental organisations (NGOs,) has resulted in some improvement, and the recently introduced Law Against Domestic Violence should assist by providing a framework for government, police and community responses to domestic violence.

== Children's rights ==
There are major issues regarding abuse of children, lack of education and high levels of malnourishment. Child abuse, including physical and psychological abuse and sexual violence is a serious problem in Timor-Leste. Additionally, corporal punishment is still used to discipline children at school and at home. The majority of incidents of violence against children are not formally reported and there are inadequate judicial remedies. There have also been reports of commercial sexual exploitation of minors, and child labour is widespread. Additionally, in some instances, parents have indentured their children in order to settle debts.

Although the constitution states that primary education is compulsory, there is no legislation establishing a minimum level of education, nor a system to ensure free education is provided. Statistics from the UN in 2009 showed that approximately 20 percent of primary school-age children nationwide were not enrolled in school, with even higher levels of non-enrolment in rural areas.

There are also high levels of child malnutrition and infant and child mortality, which the government, in conjunction with UNICEF, is working towards reducing through the “national nutrition strategy”. It is hoped that the newly established East Timor National Commission on Child Rights, mandated to promote, defend, and monitor child rights will improve the situation.

== National human rights institutions ==
The national institution of human rights is the Provedor de Direitos Humanos e Justiça (The Provedor for Human Rights and Justice [PDHJ]) which has played a key role in promoting and protecting rights since its establishment in June 2005. Its mandate is to investigate complaints of human rights violations, maladministration and corruption, and to carry out monitoring, advocacy and promotional activities. However, there is a need for a PDHJ presence in the regions, as at present complainants from the districts need to travel to Dili to lodge complaints, thus inhibiting the process. In the districts where the Provedoria is not yet established, NGO members often fulfill the role of monitoring rights.

== See also ==
- LGBTQ rights in Timor-Leste
