= Politiko.al =

- Website type: News media, political analysis
- Available in: Albanian
- Country of origin: Albania
- Area served: Albania, Kosovo, Albanian diaspora
- Founder: Alfred Lela
- Website: politiko.al
- Commercial: Yes
- Current status: Active

Politiko.al is an Albanian online news portal and media platform based in Tirana, Albania. Founded by prominent Albanian journalist and political commentator Alfred Lela, the website specializes in political news, current affairs, opinion pieces, and in-depth analysis regarding events in Albania, Kosovo, and the wider Balkans region.

== History and Profile ==
Politiko.al was established to provide an independent platform for political journalism and commentary in the Albanian media landscape. The outlet quickly gained traction for its editorial stance, daily news coverage, and political columns. It serves as a primary source for political developments, featuring contributions from various Albanian intellectuals, analysts, and public figures.

== Transparency and Editorial Standards ==
In an effort to maintain journalistic integrity and transparency, Politiko.al became one of the early worldwide participants in the Journalism Trust Initiative (JTI), a project initiated by Reporters Without Borders (RSF) and co-funded by the European Commission.

Between September and October 2020, Politiko.al voluntarily conducted and published a self-assessment according to the JTI Standard (CWA 17493). This assessment evaluated the outlet's compliance with professional media standards, internal support structures, and editorial independence.

== Founder ==
Alfred Lela is a well-known Albanian journalist, author, and political analyst. Prior to founding Politiko.al, Lela served in various senior editorial roles within the Albanian media, including working as the editor-in-chief of the newspaper Mapo. He has also been a prominent television personality, hosting political talk shows such as PolitikOn. Lela is recognized for his center-right political analysis and has been an active voice in Albanian public discourse.

== See also ==
Media of Albania

List of newspapers in Albania
