= Kasmi =

Kasmi may refer to:

== People ==
- Baya Kasmi (born 1978), French director, screenwriter and actress
- Bledi Kasmi, Albanian newspaper editor
- Faysel Kasmi (born 1995), Belgian footballer
- Gëzim Kasmi (1942–2016), Albanian footballer
- Nasir El Kasmi (born 1982), German-Moroccan footballer

== See also ==
- Maududi Hilmi Kasmi (born 1989), Bruneian footballer
