= List of Greek-language newspapers =

For list of newspapers in Greece and Cyprus, please see their separate articles:

- List of newspapers in Greece
- List of newspapers in Cyprus

The following are newspapers in the Greek language published in:

- Europe:
  - Apoyevmatini (Istanbul, Turkey)
  - Laiko Vima (Gjirokastër, Albania)
- North America:
  - Atlantis (New York City)
- Oceania:
  - Neos Kosmos (Melbourne, Australia)

== See also ==
- List of newspapers
