= Ekonomia =

Newspaper in Albania

- Format: Tabloid
- Publisher: Albanian Economic Development Agency
- Editor: Ded Kola
- Founded: 1998; 27 years ago
- Language: Albanian
- Headquarters: Tirana

Ekonomia (meaning Economy in English) is a newspaper published in Tirana, Albania.

== Profile ==
Ekonomia was established in 1998. The publisher of the paper is the Albanian Economic Development Agency. The daily is headquartered in Tirana and is published in tabloid format six times a week. The last page of the paper is published in English.

== See also ==
- List of newspapers in Albania
