= Bella Galhos =

Translator, presidential advisor and human rights activist from East Timorese

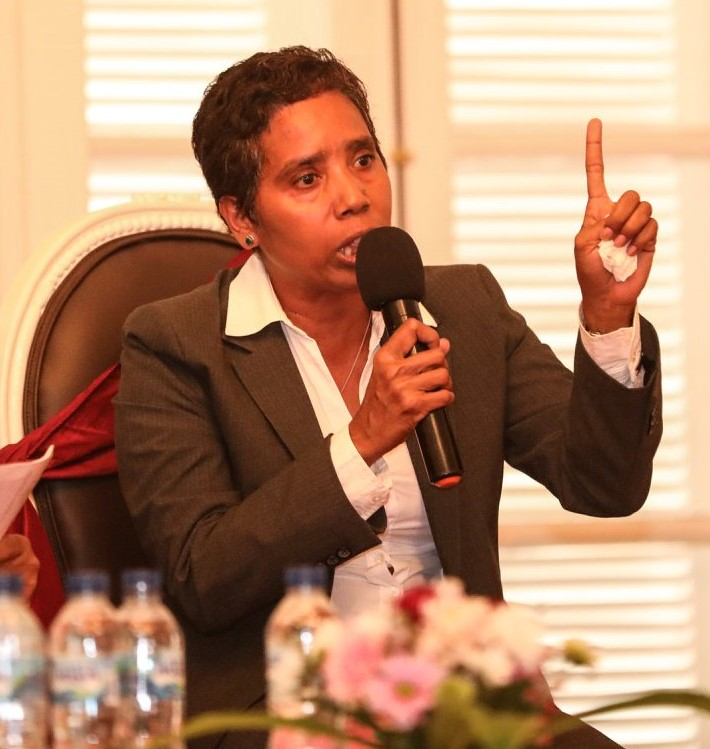
- Born: 1972 (age 53–54); Portuguese Timor
- Education: University of Hawaii
- Occupations: Independence activist, human rights defender, environmentalist, presidential advisor, translator
- Years active: 1988–present
- Employer: United Nations Mission in East Timor
- Organization: Arcoiris
- Known for: East Timorese independence activism, LGBT+ and women's rights advocacy

Bella Galhos (born 1972) is a former East Timorese independence activist during the period of Indonesian occupation of East Timor and has been a translator, presidential advisor, human rights activist and environmentalist since independence in 2002.

== Early life ==
Galhos' father reportedly had 45 children from 18 different women. After Indonesian armed forces invaded East Timor in 1975, they captured her father and brothers, and her father sold her to a soldier at the age of three for five dollars, on the grounds that she had a "very male, dominant personality". After a long campaign by her mother, Galhos was returned to the family. She reported a history of sexual violence at the hands of family members and Indonesian authorities thereafter.

At age 16, Galhos joined the Timorese independence movement, through its "clandestine front" of young activists. In 1991, several friends of Galhos were killed in the Santa Cruz massacre, organized by her uncle Constâncio Pinto. As a result, she lived for three years under a different identity as a double agent ostensibly working with the Indonesian authorities. In 1994 she was selected as a participant of a youth exchange programme to Canada with Canada World Youth. There she applied for asylum immediately. After East Timor's independence, Galhos studied psychology at the University of Hawaii.

== Independence activism in Canada ==
After Galhos applied for and received refugee status in Canada, she campaigned for human rights in East Timor with the East Timor Alert Network as one of two Canadian representatives of the National Council of Maubere Resistance. She took part in numerous international lobbying events inside and outside Canada during these years.

In January 1996, Benjamin Parwoto, the Indonesian ambassador to Canada, sought out Galhos' mother and told her to silence her daughter. The event caused a public outcry and the Canadian Department of External Affairs rebuked the ambassador.

== Career after independence ==
With the end of the Indonesian occupation in 1999, she returned to East Timor to work for the United Nations Mission in East Timor. In 2012, Galhos became a civil society adviser to President Taur Matan Ruak. In 2017, she resigned from the advisory role. She returned to work at the Presidency after the election of Jose Ramos Horta.

Galhos founded the Leublora Green Village (LGV) in Maubisse, along with a not-for-profit environmental school (Leublora Green School). This includes a women's organic farming cooperative and an organic restaurant. The project aims to promote equal rights for women and environmental awareness in East Timorese society. She has delivered TED Dili talks on issues including violence against women as part of feminist campaigning in East Timor.

Galhos is a prominent activist for LGBT+ rights in East Timor. At the CODIVA (Coalition on Diversity and Action) Pride Event 2016 (the first of its kind in East Timor), Galhos became the first woman in East Timor to publicly come out as bisexual. In 2017, Galhos was co-organizer of the first Pride March in Dili, attended by 500 people. Together with her activist colleague and development expert Iram Saeed, Galhos founded the LGBTQ organization Arcoiris (Portuguese for rainbow). In 2024, the pair were married in Australia.

== Honours and awards ==
- Woman of Courage 1999 (National Action Committee on the Status of Women, Canada)
- UN Freedom and Human Rights Award 2003
- Earth Company Impact Hero 2015
- Dalai Lama's Unsung Hero Award, 2017
- BBC's 100 Women list, 2023.

== Publication ==
- Iram Saeed and Bella Galhos: A Research Report on the Lives of Lesbian and Bisexual Women and Transgender Men in Timor-Leste, ASEAN SOGIE Caucus, East Timor, 2017.

== See also ==
- LGBT rights in East Timor
