= Postage stamps and postal history of Albania =

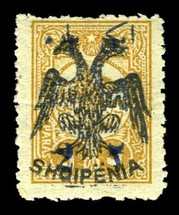
A 1913 stamp of Albania overprinted on a Turkish stamp

Postage stamps from Albania are marked Shqiperia, Shqiperise and Shqiptare.

== Turkish stamps ==
Albania used the postage stamps of Turkey from 1870 to 1913.

== First stamps ==
Albania issued its first stamps in 1913.

== World War II ==
During World War II, stamps were produced during the Italian, German and Greek occupation.

== Gallery of Albanian stamps ==
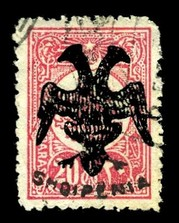
16 June 1913

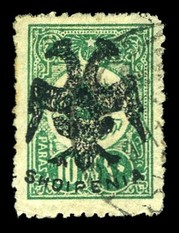
16 June 1913

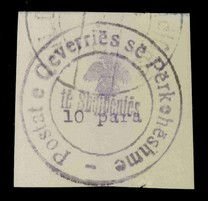
25 October 1913

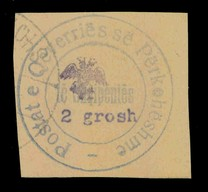
25 October 1913

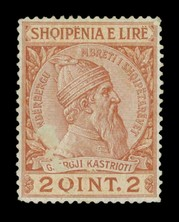
1 December 1913

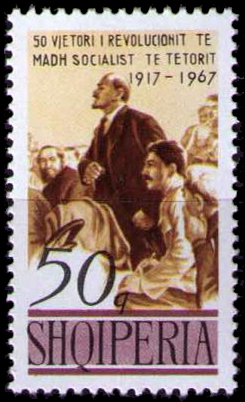
1967

== See also ==
- Posta Shqiptare
- Postage stamps and postal history of Epirus

== References and sources ==
Sources

- Encyclopedia of Postal History.
