= Sport Ekspres =

- Type: Sport
- Format: Tabloid
- Owner: Kujtim Llupo
- Founder: Fatmir Mëneri
- Editor-in-chief: Blerim Jahaj
- Founded: 5 September 1995
- Language: Albanian
- Headquarters: Tirana, Albania
- Website: sportekspres.com

Sport Ekspres is a sports newspaper published in Albania. Initially a sports supplement of the newspaper Koha Jonë, it began publication twice a week as a regular newspaper in September 1995. Its first editor-in-chief was the journalist Fatmir Mëneri, a post he held until 2012. The paper started its daily publication in 2001 and today it's the most widely read sports newspaper in the country.
