= Andreas Zarbalas =

Greek poet

Andreas Zarbalas (Greek: Ανδρέας Ζαρμπαλάς, Albanian: Andrea Zarballa, 1942) is an Albanian-born Greek poet and journalist.

== Biography ==
Zarbalas, was born in the village of Llazat near Sarandë, in southern Albania. He initially worked as a Greek language teacher in local schools. He graduated from the teacher's academy of Gjirokaster. At 1968 he started to write poems in the literary column of the newspaper Laiko Vima, which was the only printed media allowed to be published in Greek language, in communist Albania (1945–1991). He mainly composed poems in free verse. During 1970–1990, he composed several poems, but due to strict censorship by the authorities of the People's Republic of Albania he decided to bury them in order to avoid persecution. Those works were published after the restoration of Democracy (1991).

With the collapse of the communist regime in Albania that year he became one of the founding members and the first President of the local Greek political and cultural organization Omonoia. At the following elections he got elected as a representative of Omonoia in the Albanian Government.

Zarbalas published his first poetry collection We insist (Greek: Επιμένουμε), in 1981. Moreover, with his collection 101 poems for a handful of earth (Greek: Ποιήματα για μια χούφτα τόπο, 1992), written in 1972, but unpublished until 1991, Zarbalas became a key figure among the Greeks in southern Albania. He used free verse as a symbol of free spirit. Zarbalas used many traditional elements with a metaphoric and allegoric approach. Though literature was strictly censored by the regime of the People's Republic of Albania he managed in several cases to avoid censorship and to promote the distinct ethnic identity of the local Greek element by using allegory.
