= Posta Shqiptare =

National postal service of Albania

Posta Shqiptare sh.a.
- Type: Public limited company
- Industry: Postal service
- Founded: 5 December 1912
- Headquarters: Tirana, Albania
- Key people: Etjen Xhafaj (Administrator)
- Owner: Albanian Government
- Website: www.postashqiptare.al

Posta Shqiptare is the national postal service of Albania. Posta Shqiptare sh.a. is a public limited company owned by the Albanian Government. As of 2017 its CEO was Laert Duraj.

== History ==
=== Beginnings in the Ottoman Empire ===
Albania's postal service dates back to the Ottoman Empire. Based on historical archives and contemporary sources, the first post offices probably opened during the 1840s and 1850s. A more organized service started in 1878, and offices were opened in every city. At the end of the 19th century and in the early 20th century, two overseas shipping companies established offices in Albania, which also served as post offices for deliveries abroad. These were the Austrian Lloyd Company and the Italian Company of Apulia. They had establishments in all coastal cities of Albania: Shkodër, Durrës, Vlorë, Sarandë and Shëngjin.

=== After independence ===
On 5 December 1912, one week after Albania declared its independence, the Provisional Government of Ismail Qemali founded the Albanian postal, telephonic and telegraphic services. The Provisional Government also founded the Ministry of Telegraphs and Communications, whose first minister was Lef Nosi. The first Albanian postal stamps were issued on 5 May 1913. Under this government, six different stamps were produced.

On 7 July 1913, the Albanian Provisional Government applied to become a member of the General Postal Union, a process that was completed on 1 March 1922. During this time, 17 offices were connected by 1,400 km (870 mi) of cables. The headquarters in Tirana consisted of a director, four telegraphists, a prime telegraphist, two postal workers and a delivery worker. In 1938, 68 postal offices and agencies operated throughout Albania. As Italian investment grew in the country, the need to communicate with Italy became more important. For this reason, the Albanian government decided to install a short-wave radio station, which enabled telephone and telegraph connections between Rome and Tirana.

=== Communist period (1946–1990) ===
During World War II, many networks and lines were damaged. In 1946, a new telephone line was installed between Tirana and Peshkopi, which was extended to connect Tirana with Belgrade and Skopje. Connections were established throughout the country and by the 1970s post offices opened in every city or village in Albania.

=== Post-communist era (1990–present) ===
Many international companies, such as DHL, TNT, UPS and FedEx, started operating in Albania. Posta Shqiptare began to provide financial services. From 1998 to 2001, the infrastructure was improved, funded by private investment. In September 1999, law number 8530 was approved by Parliament. According to the law, postal services can be offered by any postal company, except for those reserved for Posta Shqiptare. Since 2008, Posta Shqiptare has 15 postal affiliates and 19 branches. It offers service to 553 post offices throughout Albania. Albanian Post (based on PAP1) offers free internet at 553 offices. Albanian Post planned to start the implementation of PAP2 in cooperation with Prefectures, Municipalities and Communes of the country, adding 1200 points of free internet.

== See also ==
- Postal codes in Albania
- Postage stamps and postal history of Albania
