= Reporteri =

University of Tirana student newspaper

- Publisher: University of Tirana
- Founded: 20 October 1993; 32 years ago
- Headquarters: Tirana
- Website: reporteri.net

Reporteri is a student newspaper published in Tirana, Albania.

== History and profile ==
Reporteri, which is published in Albanian, was established on 20 October 1993 as a monthly student newspaper published by those attending the department of journalism at the University of Tirana. Its foundation was supported by three US graduate journalism students from Columbia University who taught journalism at the University of Tirana. In addition, its foundation was financially assisted by the IMF and the Soros Foundation. In the first issue the aim of Reporteri was stated as "to provide objective and balanced information, free of political or ideological taint." The first editor-in-chief of the paper was Uliana Kociu.

Following the publication of the first issue which featured issues like corruption, prostitution, smuggling, the position of minorities, the new tax system and pollution the paper was closed down by university authorities. Later the paper was relaunched by the Soros Foundation and in the autumn of 1995, it moved back to the university following the appointment of a new dean.

In March 2006, the paper became a fortnightly supplement to the Saturday edition of the now-defunct daily Korrieri through financial support of the Organization for Security and Cooperation in Europe.

== See also ==
- List of newspapers in Albania
