= Basir Çollaku =

Albanian journalist

Basir Çollaku is an Albanian journalist and head of the Albanian Telegraphic Agency in Albania. Çollaku usually publish his personal opinion in Rilindja Demokratike.
