= Nikollë Lesi =

Albanian newspaper editor and politician

Member of the Albanian Parliament
- In office 2001–2005

Personal details
- Born: 6 August 1963 (age 62) Lezhë, PR Albania
- Party: Demochristian Party of Albania
- Occupation: Newspaper editor, politician
- Known for: Owner of Koha Jonë, Albania's first private newspaper

Nikollë Lesi (born 6 August 1963) is an Albanian journalist, former politician and the owner of the newspaper Koha Jonë.

Koha Jonë was Albania's first private newspaper, and was founded by Nikollë Lesi.
