= Mihal Sherko =

Albanian journalist (1887–1964)

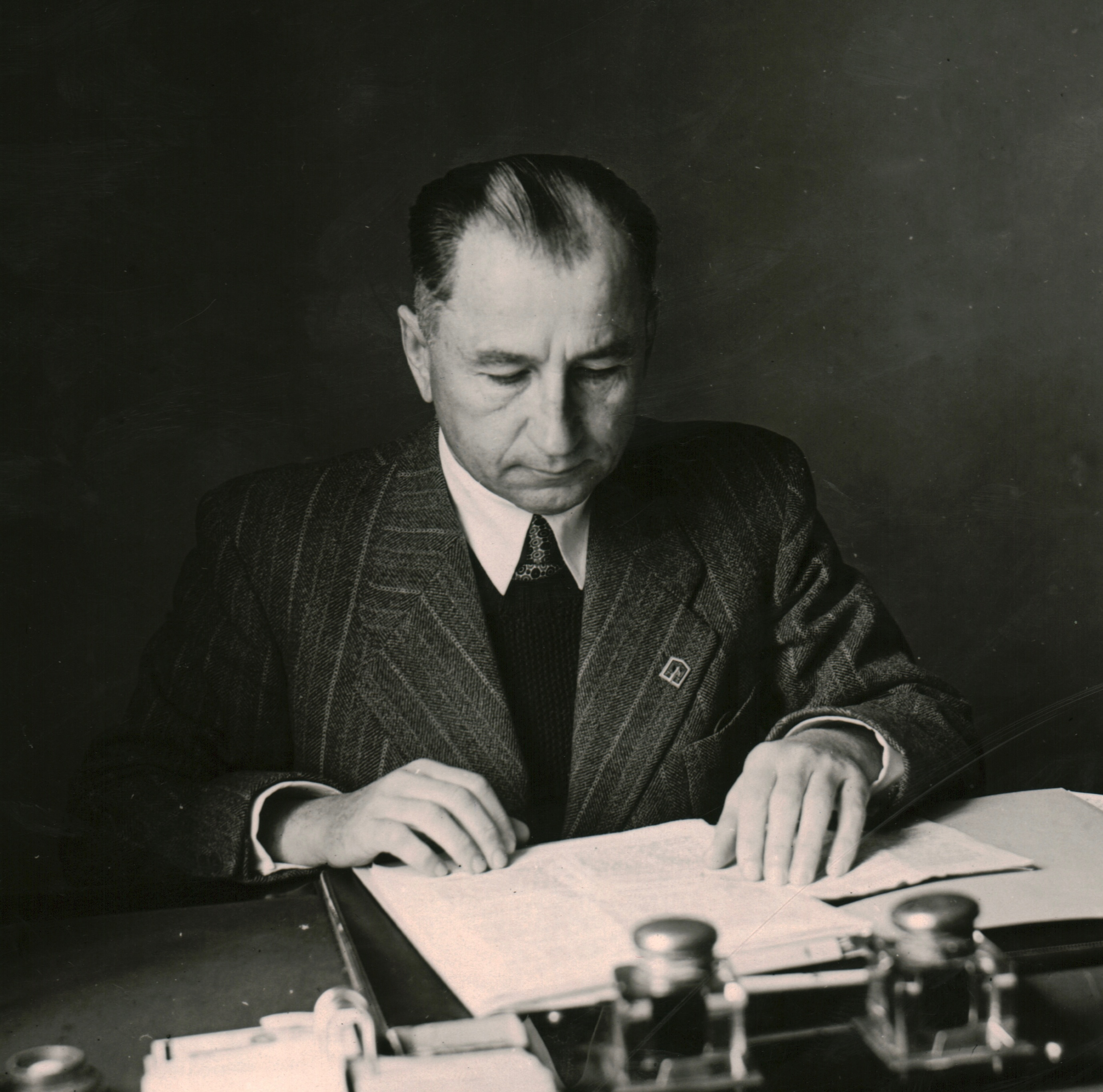

2nd Culture Minister of Albania
- In office 18 January 1943 – 11 February 1943

Personal details
- Born: 27 October 1887 Korçë, Manastir Vilayet, Ottoman Empire (modern Albania)
- Died: 1 December 1964 (aged 77) Tirana, People's Republic of Albania
- Education: Odessa University

Mihal Sherko (1887–1964) was an Albanian journalist, diplomat, educator and media pioneer, widely acknowledged as the founder of the Albanian Telegraphic Agency.

== Biography ==
Sherko was born on October 27, 1887, in Korçë, a city in south-eastern Albania, then part of the Ottoman Empire. He graduated in 1915 from the Faculty of History and Philosophy at the University of Odessa, then within the Russian Empire. From 1915 to 1921, he was professor of Latin in the same city where he graduated. The following year, Sherko moved back to Korçë and taught at a local high school. In 1924, he was named head of the General Directorate of Education. On July 25, 1927, he was appointed director of the Press Office at the Ministry of Foreign Affairs which later was to become the Albanian Telegraphic Agency. From April 8 to 12, 1939 Sherko was member in charge of Foreign Affairs in the Provisional Administrative Committee. Later he worked as a clerk in the Liquidation Office (former MFA). From 1941 to 1943 he served as Inspector of Medicine and in the ensuing months was elected Deputy of the National Assembly, then served briefly as Minister of Popular Culture. In 1944, he was the main organizer of the automobile tourist club KTAM. Sherko was arrested the next year and was trialed at the Special Court of 1945 which sentenced him to 20 years imprisonment. He died on December 1, 1964.

== Personal life ==
Sherko was married to Russian citizen Elena D'Arkudinski, belonging to a family of Russian aristocracy with blood ties to the Romanovs. In 1924, following the dissolution of the Russian Empire, the couple fled to Albania. They had a son named Sergej.
