= LGBTQ rights in Timor-Leste =

- Timor-Leste
- Legal status: Legal since 1975
- Gender identity: No
- Military: No explicit ban
- Discrimination protections: Some sexual orientation and gender identity protections. Hate crime protections since 2009

Family rights
- Recognition of relationships: No
- Adoption: Single people may adopt

Lesbian, gay, bisexual, transgender and queer (LGBTQ) people in Timor-Leste face legal challenges not experienced by non-LGBTQ residents. Both male and female same-sex sexual activity are legal in Timor-Leste, but same-sex couples and households headed by same-sex couples are not eligible for the same legal protections available to opposite-sex married couples. Although there is no broad legal protection against discrimination, there are several legal provisions in specific laws that protect against discrimination based on sexual orientation and gender identity.

Timor-Leste and the Philippines are considered as leaders on human rights in Southeast Asia, including LGBTQ rights. In 2011, the country signed the "joint statement on ending acts of violence and related human rights violations based on sexual orientation and gender identity" at the United Nations, condemning violence and discrimination against LGBTQ people. In July 2017, just 15 years after independence, the nation's first ever pride march was conducted with the support of the Timorese Government. Among the participants of the pride march were LGBTQ citizens, nuns, religious ministers, tribal folks, students, and government officials. The event has been held annually ever since.

== Law regarding same-sex sexual activity ==
Same-sex sexual activity has been legal since 1975. The age of consent is 14 regardless of sexual orientation or gender.

== Recognition of same-sex relationships ==
There is no legal recognition of same-sex unions in Timor-Leste.

The Civil Code (Law No. 10/2011) states the following:

- Article 1467 (Notion of marriage): Marriage is the contract concluded between two people of different sex who want to start a family through a full communion of life, in accordance with the provisions of this Code.
- Article 1517 (Non-existent marriages): 1. It is legally non-existent: e) Marriage contracted by two people of the same sex.

Nevertheless, Law on Domestic Violence No. 07/2010 establishes that people who live or have lived in conditions analogous to those of spouses are considered family, even without cohabitation. The law broadly encompasses intimate relationships regardless of gender.

== Adoption ==
The Civil Code (Law No. 10/2011) states the following:

- Article 1858 (Who can adopt):

1. Two people who have been married for more than four years and have not been legally separated from people and goods or in fact can adopt, if both are over twenty-five years old.

2. Those who are over thirty years of age can also adopt or, if the adopting is the child of the adopter's spouse, more than twenty five years.

3. Only those who are not over sixty years old on the date on which the minor was entrusted to them can adopt, and from the age of fifty the age difference between the adopter and the adopted person cannot exceed fifty years.

=== Family planning ===
The Government Resolution No. 10/2022 on the National Family Planning Policy establishes that one of the "Principles and Values of Family Planning" is to be inclusive and non-discriminatory. It states that "The Family Planning Policy must ensure that its implementation of services is not discriminatory against gender, age, class, disability status, disability, race, ethnicity and sexual orientation. Family Planning must be available to all spouses and couples who are prepared and ready to form a family."

== Discrimination protections ==
There is no specific anti-discrimination law that offers broad legal protection based on sexual orientation or gender identity. However, there are several legal provisions in specific laws that explicitly mention sexual orientation and gender identity as protected categories from discrimination:

- Penal Execution Regime, Decree-Law No. 14/2014. Article 3(3) states that "Execution must be carried out impartially, without discrimination based on sex, sexual orientation, ethnic origin, skin color, territory of origin, marital status, language, nationality, religion, political or ideological convictions, education, economic situation or social condition."
- Land Law No. 13/2017. Article 2(i) states that “Vulnerable groups” means the group of people who, in due to issues related to their ethnicity, religion, origin, social status, gender, sexual orientation, age, physical or mental disability, is in a position more susceptible to having their rights violated as citizens.
- Law No. 3/2017 on the Prevention and Fight against Human Trafficking and Fourth Amendment to the Penal Code. Article 3 states that the application of this law, in particular the measures that aim to protect and promote the rights of victims, it must be ensured without any discrimination based on sexual orientation.

There was a clause against discrimination based on sexual orientation included in the original draft of the Timorese Constitution but it was voted out by 52 out of 88 MPs before the Constitution took effect in 2002.

In April 2019, the Timorese Minister of Legislative Reform and Parliamentary Affairs called for an end to discrimination against LGBTQ people saying, "Barbaric laws and discriminatory treatment of marginalized groups have to end". Moreover, in response to allegations made in the National Parliament by two MPs, he announced that he would request an official inquiry into allegations of ill-treatment of disabled and LGBTQ patients at the national hospital in Dili.

=== State social protection program ===
Article 7(k) of Decree-Law No. 22/2024 on One-off Support Allowance for Vulnerable People, states that the benefit is granted to individuals and households facing situations of extreme temporary vulnerability, as a result of the following situations: Belonging to the LGBTQI+ population.

Ministerial Diploma No. 40/2024 on the Regulation of the One-Off Support Allowance for Vulnerable People, states that a "Declaration from a Non-Governmental Organization or local community leader acknowledging the individual's membership in the LGBTQI+ population" is one of the common attachments to application.

=== Employment ===
==== Sexual harassment ====
Guidelines No. 12/2017 on Prevention and combating sexual harassment in the Public Service, approved by the Public Service Commission, states that acts that may constitute sexual harassment include for example, asking about another person's sexual preferences or sex life and telling lies or spreading rumors about a person's sex life.

=== Children and youth protections ===
Since 2023, Timor-Leste has broad legal protections that explicitly protect LGBTI children and adolescents. Law No. 6/2023 on the Protection of Children and Young People in Danger. Article 6(n) states that all children and young people have equal rights and cannot be subject to any type of discrimination based on sex, gender, sexual orientation, among others.

In 2024, the Ministry of Solidarity and Social Inclusion of Timor-Leste issued Ministerial Decree No. 11/MSSI/V/2024 approving the Standard Operating Procedures for the management of child and youth protection cases. The objective is to establish a national standard that ensures that all children and youth, regardless of gender, nationality, sexual orientation, religion or disability, have adequate access to child and youth protection services and are protected from violence (including sexual and gender-based violence), abuse and exploitation in the community, and that affected children and youth receive appropriate support through the case management process.

It sets out the following definitions:

- Gender. Describes the social attributes and opportunities associated with men and women and the relationship between women and men and girls and boys. This is different from sex, which is often defined at birth based on biological anatomy. Non-binary gender identity refers to any gender identity or expression that does not fit the binary man/woman or girl/woman. Gender plays a critical role in how children are treated and how their rights are respected within the family and community. Societal gender norms influence the experiences, potential and risks of girls and boys differently. These gender norms also affect children who have non-binary gender identities or sexual characteristics, such as those who identify as lesbian, gay, bisexual or transgender or those who are intersex. Pre-existing gender inequalities tend to increase during humanitarian crises. For example, transgender children may be at greater risk of prejudice, stigma, violence or difficulties accessing humanitarian services. Analysis of children's gender-related risks and resilience should be conducted during the case management cycle. Gender also impacts family dynamics and childcare arrangements.
- LGBTI children. LGBTI means for lesbian, gay, bisexual, transgender and intersex. This describes a group of young people, including children, who may have different gender identities based on birth assignment, a sexual orientation other than heterosexual, or are intersex, meaning they are born with variations in sex characteristics. LGBTI refers to a group of people who share some things in common and where there is also diversity. Each group of people within the LGBTI community has different special needs.
- Sexual and gender-based violence. Any act committed against a person's will based on gender norms and unbalanced power relations. This includes threats of violence and coercion. This can be physical, emotional, psychological or sexual in nature and can take the form of denial of resources or access to services. This poses a danger to women, girls, men and boys.
- Principle 3 on Equality and non-discrimination. All children and young people have equal rights and shall not be subjected to any form of discrimination based on any condition, such as colour, race, sex, gender, language, religion, national origin, sexual orientation or condition, economic action, political or ideological opinion of the child, his/her family or key responsible persons.
- Role and Responsibilities of the Case Manager in Child Protection. Child protection officers and their interventions include: Working with key officials, parents, community and referring to government and non-government service providers to respond to specific needs based on individual children and young people's needs, strengths and vulnerabilities including: age, gender identity, sexual orientation, developmental stage, disability.
- Assistance to child and young people survivors of (sexual) violence. Treat all children fairly. All children should be offered the same impartial support regardless of their sex, age, sexual orientation, gender identity, family situation, caregiver status or any other part of their identity. Let us not treat children who experience sexual violence as helpless children. Every child has unique capabilities and strengths and has the capacity to heal. Talk to child survivors in a way that understands them.
- On temporary alternative care for domestic violence. Children or young people may be separated from their parents and placed in alternative care for a variety of reasons. For example, when parents or guardians are unable to fulfil their responsibility to protect children or young people from harm and adequately support their development and well-being or in emergency situations or humanitarian crises, such as natural disasters and migration which separate many families. Other children or young people end up in foster care due to discrimination based on disability (or disability of parents), ethnicity, sex and sexual orientation. Placing children in foster care can cause immediate and long-term harm due to family separation and inadequate alternative care. Children in foster care are often isolated from their families and local communities. Deprived of parental care, they may suffer physical, psychological, emotional and social harm. These children and young people are also more likely to suffer violence, abuse, neglect and exploitation.

==== Education ====
Since 2023, there are explicit legal protections in education.

- Decree-Law No. 31/2023, First Amendment to Decree-Law No. 23/2010 on the Career Statute for Kindergarten Teachers and Primary and Secondary School Teachers (Teaching Career Statute). Article 3(a) states: "Equality and non-discrimination, with everyone having the right to equal opportunities in obtaining academic qualifications, training, entry, access and career progression, without discrimination of any kind, in particular on the basis of colour, race, marital status, sex, sexual orientation, ethnic origin, language, ancestry, social position or economic situation, political or ideological beliefs, religion, education or physical or mental condition."
- Decree-Law No. 32/2023, Legal Framework for the National Basic Education System. Article 4(2) states that "Inclusive education is understood as education capable of responding to the diversity of potentialities and needs of each and every child and young person, through the availability and opportunity of access and the guarantee of their effective participation in learning processes without any type of discrimination, namely based on race, colour, gender, sexual orientation, language, religion, political opinion, place of residence of the child, their parents or guardians, or their national, ethnic or social origin, economic situation, birth, health condition, special educational needs or any other situation."
- Decree-Law No. 33/2023, Legal Framework of the National Secondary Education System. Article 4(2) states that "Inclusive education" means education capable of responding to the diversity of potentialities and needs of each and every child and young person, through the availability and opportunity of access and the guarantee of their effective participation in learning processes without any type of discrimination, in particular based on sexual orientation, among others.

=== Health ===
Since 2022, there are explicit legal protections in health:

- Law No. 13/2022, Second amendment to Law No. 10/2004 Health System Law. Article 3-2(o) states that the health policy must comply with the access to family planning, reproductive, school, visual, oral and mental health and early diagnosis, without discrimination based on gender identity and sexual orientation.
- Decree-Law No. 88/2022, Third amendment to Decree-Law No. 14/2004 on the Exercise of Health Professions. Article 3-B(e) states that health professionals must provide care to people without discrimination on the grounds of sexual orientation.

=== Hate crimes law ===
Since 2009, bias on the basis of sexual orientation has been considered to be an aggravating circumstance in the case of crimes (alongside ethnicity, gender, religion, disability, etc.).

=== Gender-based violence protections ===
Since 2024, through the Ministry of Solidarity and Social Inclusion of Timor-Leste, there are legal protections against gender violence that explicitly include lesbian, bisexual, transgender and intersex people.

Ministerial Decree No. 10/MSSI/V/2024 Approving the Standard Operating Procedures on Management and Coordination to Support Victims of Gender-Based Violence, establishes the following measures that offer protection to the LGBTQI community:

- The Social Worker shall not discriminate based on the social status of the victim, including: religion, age, politics, private interest, disability status, gender and sexual orientation.
- It establishes that the term LGBTQI is used to refer to individuals who do not belong to the heteronormative construction of sexual orientation and gender identity, and includes lesbian, gay, bisexual, transgender and intersex people.
- It states that one of the key principles underpinning Case Management is serving victims without discrimination based on sexual orientation.
- When providing care to people belonging to the LGBTQI community, Social Technicians or Social Workers must consider the following aspects:
  - Prioritize the safety of victims and guarantee their access to care/assistance without judgment.
  - Make sure you fully understand the diverse terminology related to the identity of the LGBTQI community (do not use inappropriate words in the service process).
  - Reflect on or review our own preconceptions in order to provide quality and non-discriminatory care or assistance.
  - Does not take into account the gender identity or sexual orientation of the victim.
  - Make sure that the language used is not critical or demeaning to the victim.
  - Do not reveal the victim's gender identity and sexual orientation to another person or member without the victim's authorization.
- Among the principles of the Response Mechanisms to the Sexual Exploitation, Abuse and Harassment of Victims of Violence, the needs of victims/survivors must be prioritized without discrimination based on sex, gender, ability, sexual orientation and other characteristics.

=== Hate speech provisions ===
- Law No. 5/2014 Social Communication Law. Article 4: These are the duties of the media. c) Do not make discriminatory references to race, religion, sex, sexual preferences, illnesses, political beliefs and social status.
- The Code of Conduct for Media Professionals (Regulation 111/STAE/III/07), approved by The National Election Commission, states that professionals and media outlets, when carrying out electoral coverage, must "Use language that is not defamatory, slanderous or aggressive, nor that incites violence, or that discriminates against people, especially based on color, race, origin, nationality, sex, sexual orientation, political or religious choice, and mental disability or physics." For the purposes of this code, media professionals are journalists and correspondents from the written press, radio and television stations, whether public or private, who work in Timor-Leste.
- Code of Conduct for Media Professionals for Presidential and Parliamentary Elections (Regulation 09/STAE/X/2011). Article 7(i) states that professionals and media outlets, when carrying out electoral coverage, must: "Reject plagiarism, deliberate distortion of reality, unfounded accusations, use of defamatory, slanderous, aggressive language or language that incites violence or discrimination against people based on color, race, ethnicity, origin, nationality, sex, sexual orientation, political or religious choice and mental or physical disability."
- Government Decree No. 10/2017, Approves the Technical Procedures for Carrying out Journalistic Coverage Activities of the Presidential Election. Article 7(i) states that professionals and media outlets, when carrying out their activity of covering the news of the electoral process, must reject plagiarism, deliberate distortion of reality, unfounded accusations and the use of defamatory, slanderous, aggressive language or language that incites violence or discrimination against people based on sexual orientation, among others.

=== National Police ===
The legal provisions that protect LGB people from discrimination are the following:

- Decree-Law No. 44/2020 Disciplinary Regulation of the National Police of Timor-Leste. Article 13(1) states that the duty of correction consists of treating people in general and members of the PNTL with respect, without discrimination based on their sexual orientation, always bearing in mind that interpersonal relationships must be based on rules of courtesy, justice, equality and integrity.
- Decree-Law No. 69/2022 Professional Statute of personnel with police functions of the PNTL. Articles 15(6)(f) and 18(b) bans discrimination based on sexual orientation.
- Decree-Law No. 35/2024 Statute of the Police Officers of the National Police of Timor-Leste. Article 16 on "Professional duties" states: f) To promptly carry out all missions or acts of service, without their execution being hindered by reason of their sexual orientation. In addition, Article 17 on "Special duties" states: b) To act without discrimination on the grounds of sexual orientation.

== Military service ==
There are no explicit legal prohibitions against LGBTQ people serving in the Timor Leste Defence Force according to:

- Decree-Law No. 17/2006 on Military Discipline Regulation
- Decree-Law No. 33/2020 on the Statute of Military Personnel of Timor-Leste Defence Forces
- Decree-Law No. 3/2021 that Approves the Regulation of the Military Service Law
- Decree-Law No. 5/2022 on the Organic Statute of FALINTIL Timor-Leste Defence Forces (F-FDTL)

However, there are no inclusive and anti-discrimination measures towards LGBTQ people in the Timor Leste Defence Force.

== Living conditions ==
The Roman Catholic Church has a strong influence in the country and was the main opponent to the constitutional clause to protect LGBTQ people from discrimination. In 2002, when the clause was discussed in Parliament, a prominent Christian politician argued there weren't any gay people in Timor-Leste and called homosexuality a "disease". However, in recent years, many LGBTQ individuals have also found support within the Catholic Church. While the Church has not taken an official stance in support of LGBTQ rights, many congregations have got involved to support the community. A Catholic nun volunteered to officiate the 2017 Pride parade with a prayer.

Discrimination and violence from family members and the broader society continue to affect LGBTQ people. A 2017 survey of 57 young lesbian and bisexual women as well as transgender men co-authored by activist Bella Galhos found that 86% of the respondents had experienced both physical and psychological violence, including domestic violence, forced marriages and attempts by family members to change their sexual orientation or gender identity.

== Advocacy and activism ==
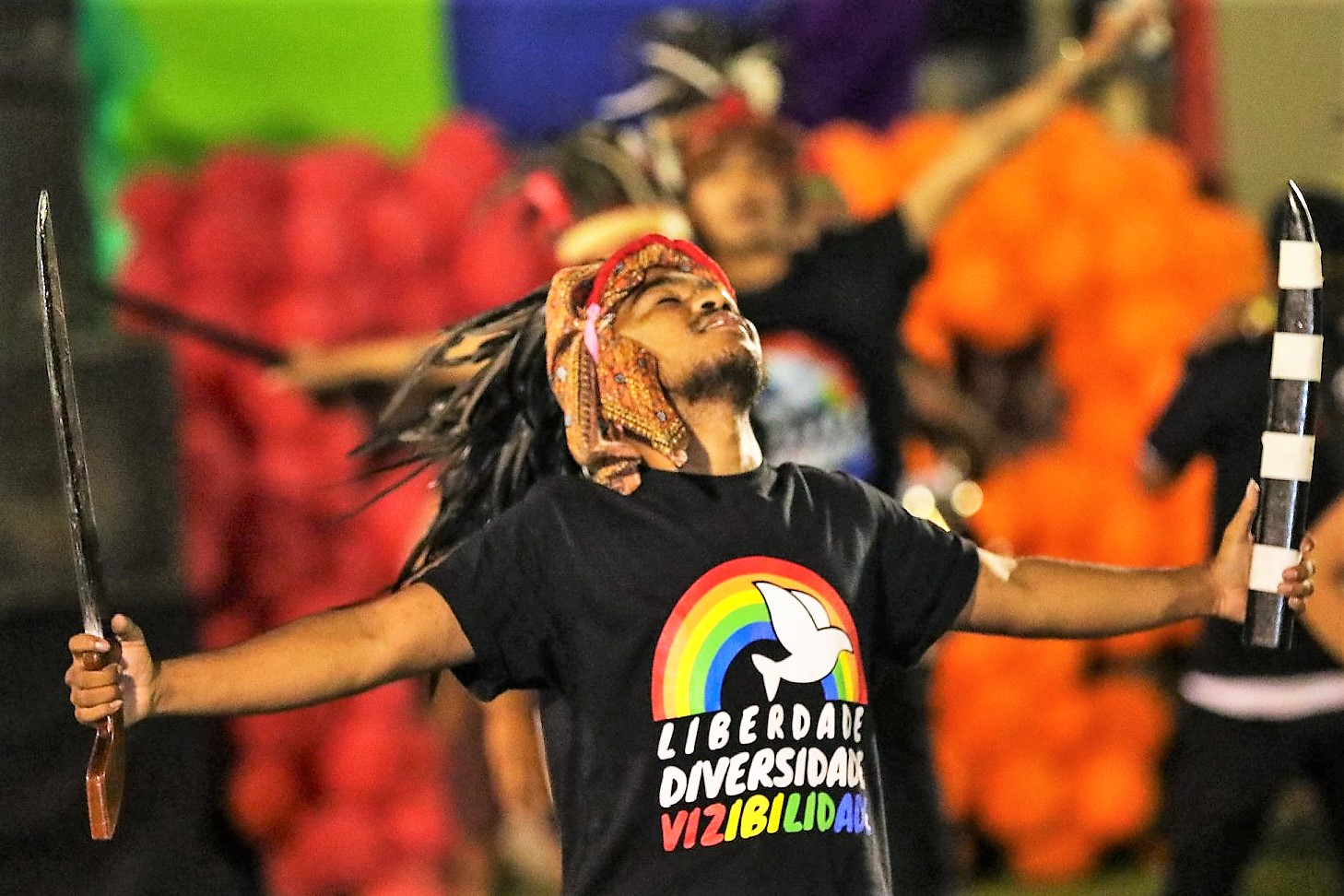
Pride March 2019 in Dili

LGBTQ advocacy groups in Timor-Leste include: Hatutan, CODIVA (Coalition on Diversity and Action), and Arco Iris.

On 29 June 2017, the first pride parade in Timor-Leste took place in the capital city of Dili with reportedly 500 people in attendance. A Catholic nun spoke at the beginning of the event. The same week, Prime Minister Rui Maria de Araújo declared that "discrimination, disrespect and abuse towards people because of their sexual orientation or gender identity does not provide any benefit to our nation" and that "every person has the potential to contribute to the development of our nation, including the LGBTQ community", thus becoming the first Southeast Asian leader to publicly support LGBTQ rights.

Activists continue to speak about violence against LGBTQ people on a regular basis. In April 2018, the Timorese LGBTQ organization Hatutan launched a documentary on acceptance of LGBTQ people within their families, entitled Dalan ba Simu Malu in Tetum (The Road to Acceptance). The launch was attended by former president and former Prime Minister Xanana Gusmão and representatives of several embassies and organizations.

The second pride parade was held on 20 July 2018 in Dili. About 1,500 people participated, three times that of the previous year. The event began with a screening of the aforementioned documentary "Dalan ba Simu Malu", and followed with a march led by a local band who played traditional Timorese resistance songs.

The third pride parade was held on 12 July 2019 in Dili. About 3,000 people participated, double of that of the previous year, and six times the number of people who took part in the first such event in 2017. Minister of Social Solidarity and Inclusion Armanda Berta dos Santos supported the event. President Francisco Guterres released a statement in support of the event, writing "I am a President for all people! I respect everyone! Respect and love tie us as family, as community, as a people. I ask everyone to see diversity as our nation's wealth. Together we strengthen collective power and knowledge. Together we fight for a society which is more just. Together we build a Nation which is full with respect and love to all."

== Human rights reports ==
=== 2017 United States Department of State report ===
In 2017, the United States Department of State reported the following, concerning the status of LGBTQ rights in Timor-Leste:

- Acts of Violence, Discrimination, and Other Abuses Based on Sexual Orientation and Gender Identity
  "The constitution and law are silent on same-sex relations and other matters of sexual orientation and gender identity. The PDHJ [Office of the Provedor for Human Rights and Justice] worked with civil society organization CODIVA (Coalition on Diversity and Action) to increase awareness in the lesbian, gay, bisexual, transgender, and intersex (LGBTI) community regarding processes available for human rights complaints. While physical abuse in public or by public authorities was uncommon, LGBTI persons were often verbally abused and discriminated against in some public services, including medical centers. CODIVA noted that transgender members of the community were particularly vulnerable to harassment and discrimination. A November study conducted for Rede Feto, a national women’s advocacy network, with lesbian and bisexual women and transgender men in Dili and Bobonaro documented the use by family members of corrective rape, physical and psychological abuse, ostracism, discrimination, and marginalization against LGBTI individuals. Access to education was limited for some LGBTI persons who were removed from the family home or who feared abuse at school. Transgender students were more likely to experience bullying and drop out of school at the secondary level. In June members of civil society organized Timor-Leste’s first-ever Pride March in Dili. The march included participation from students, activists, and a representative of the Prime Minister’s Office. Then prime minister Araujo met with LGBTI organizations and called for acceptance of LGBTI individuals on his official Facebook and Twitter accounts."
- Discrimination with Respect to Employment and Occupation
  "There is no specific protection against discrimination based on sexual orientation."

== Summary table ==
Right	Legal status
Same-sex sexual activity legal	Yes (Since 1975)
Equal age of consent (14)	Yes (Since 1975)
Anti-discrimination laws in employment only	No / Yes (only concerning sexual harassment in the public sector)
Anti-discrimination laws in the provision of goods and services	No / Yes (only in health and education)
Anti-discrimination laws in all other areas (Incl. indirect discrimination, hate speech)	No / Yes (incitement to violence and discrimination based on sexual orientation, only in the media and the electoral coverage)
Hate crime laws include sexual orientation	Yes (Since 2009)
Gender-based violence protections including sexual orientation and gender identity	Yes (Since 2024)
LGBTQ anti-discrimination law in public and private schools	Yes (Since 2023)
Same-sex marriage	No
Recognition of same-sex couples	No
Stepchild adoption by same-sex couples	No
Joint adoption by same-sex couples	No
LGBTQ people allowed to serve openly in the military	
Right to change legal gender	No
Access to IVF for lesbians	Yes (Since 2022)
Commercial surrogacy for gay male couples	No
MSMs allowed to donate blood	No

== See also ==
- Human rights in Timor-Leste
- LGBT rights in Asia
