= Andrea Stefani (composer) =

Italian monk, flagellant, poet, singer and composer (fl. 1400s)

- Born: c. 1375; Florence
- Died: After 1460; Lucca

Andrea Stefani (fl. 1400s) was an Italian monk, flagellant, poet, singer and composer. He was active in Florence and Lucca during the late medieval and early renaissance periods, and was a late member of the Trecento movement.

== Life ==
=== Florence ===
Stefani was a member of the Order of the Bianchi Gesuati, or the "White Jesuits". (Note: Not related to the modern Jesuit order) He took part in public processions of the Bianchi movement in Florence in 1399, and was a leading singer.

=== Lucca ===
Stefani settled in Lucca in 1406. He contributed three surviving musical works to the Lucca Codex, or "Codex Mancini" (Archivio di Stato 184)(c. 1410 - 1430). He also wrote five lauds without music. From 1445 to 1446, Stefani was treasurer of the Monastery of St Fregionaia di Lucca.

Stefani's longevity is notable. Stefani's will, dated 1460, is preserved in the archive of St Fregionaia, in which he left his inheritance to the monastery. A memoir was also included that details his life from his arrival in Lucca, to the time of its writing. It has been deduced that Stefani must have been 24 or 25 at the time of his processions in Florence, making his estimated age exceed 80.

== Works ==
=== Ballate ===
- Con tutta gentilezza
- I' senti matutino

=== Madrigal ===
- Morte m'a sciolt
