= Logos Radio =

- Strovolos; Cyprus
- Frequencies: 101.1 MHz (National); 101.6 MHz (Paphos); 101.7 MHz (Larnaca); 101.9 MHz (Famagusta)
- Branding: O Logos (Ο Λόγος)

Programming
- Format: News, talk and music

Ownership
- Owner: Church of Cyprus

History
- First air date: April 25, 1992
- Last air date: June 20, 2018
- Call sign meaning: O Logos (Ο Λόγος)

Technical information
- ERP: 40 dBW (National); 30 dBW (Paphos); 37 dBW (Larnaca); 23 dBW (Famagusta)

Links
- Webcast: Diesi FM 101,1
- Website: www.diesicyprus.com.cy

Logos Radio was the broadcast media outlet of the Orthodox Church of Cyprus. It was initially launched as a television and radio (1992) station, but the television broadcasting rights were later sold to Mega Channel in October 1999. It was transmitted on 101.1, 101.6, 101.7 and 101.9 FM. On 20 June 2018, it was replaced by Diesi FM Cyprus. The Greek word Λόγος (Logos) means "Reason" in English.

In 2018, Logos Radio started broadcasting again from the frequency of the local radio station of the parish of Agios Dimitrios, Acropolis of Nicosia, at 93.3 under the new name "Alithinos Logos" with also new national broadcasting license at 101.9 and 90.5.
