= Albanian Telegraphic Agency =

Albanian national news agency

- Agjencia Telegrafike Shqiptare

Agency overview
- Formed: 25 July 1927; by official decree October 9, 1954; 72 years ago (Note: The establishment of the Albanian Telegraphic Agency was officially announced on 9 October 1954, following executive decree No. 1960 by the chairman of the presidium Haxhi Lleshi.)
- Jurisdiction: Government of Albania
- Headquarters: Tirana, Albania
- Employees: 80
- Agency executive: Valbona Zhupa, Director General
- Website: ata.gov.al

The Albanian Telegraphic Agency (ATSH; Albanian: Agjencia Telegrafike Shqiptare) is the official multimedia news agency of the Albanian government. Its content is published in some of the main news agencies around the world of which it has contractual agreements with, such as: AFP, DPA, ANSA, Xinhua, Anadolu, etc. The agency is a member of the European Alliance of News Agencies (EANA), the Alliance of Mediterranean News Agencies (AMAN) and the Association of the Balkan News Agencies (ABNA).

== History ==
The first Press Office in Albania opened in 1920 at the Ministry of Internal Affairs, while in 1927 it moved to the Ministry of Foreign Affairs. Documents from this time period uncovered at the Central State Archive, show that the functions related to ATSH (as a news agency) were retained by the Ministry of Internal Affairs. On January 18, 1943, newspaper "Tomori", while compiling the biography of the Minister of Popular Culture, writes that Mihal Sherko created ATSH in 1927, within the Press Office at the Ministry of Foreign Affairs.

In 1929, the office passed under the auspices of the Prime Minister and until 1939 it was interchangeably a structure of the Ministry of Interior and the Ministry of Foreign Affairs, always with Mihal Sherko as its head. After the fascist occupation on April 7, 1939, the office was dissolved and transferred to the General Directorate of Press, Propaganda and Tourism, with which it remained until 1941.

A government decree on December 3, 1941 created for the first time the Ministry of Popular Culture, taking over all the duties of the General Directorate of Press, Propaganda and Tourism that ceased to exist.

=== Communist period ===
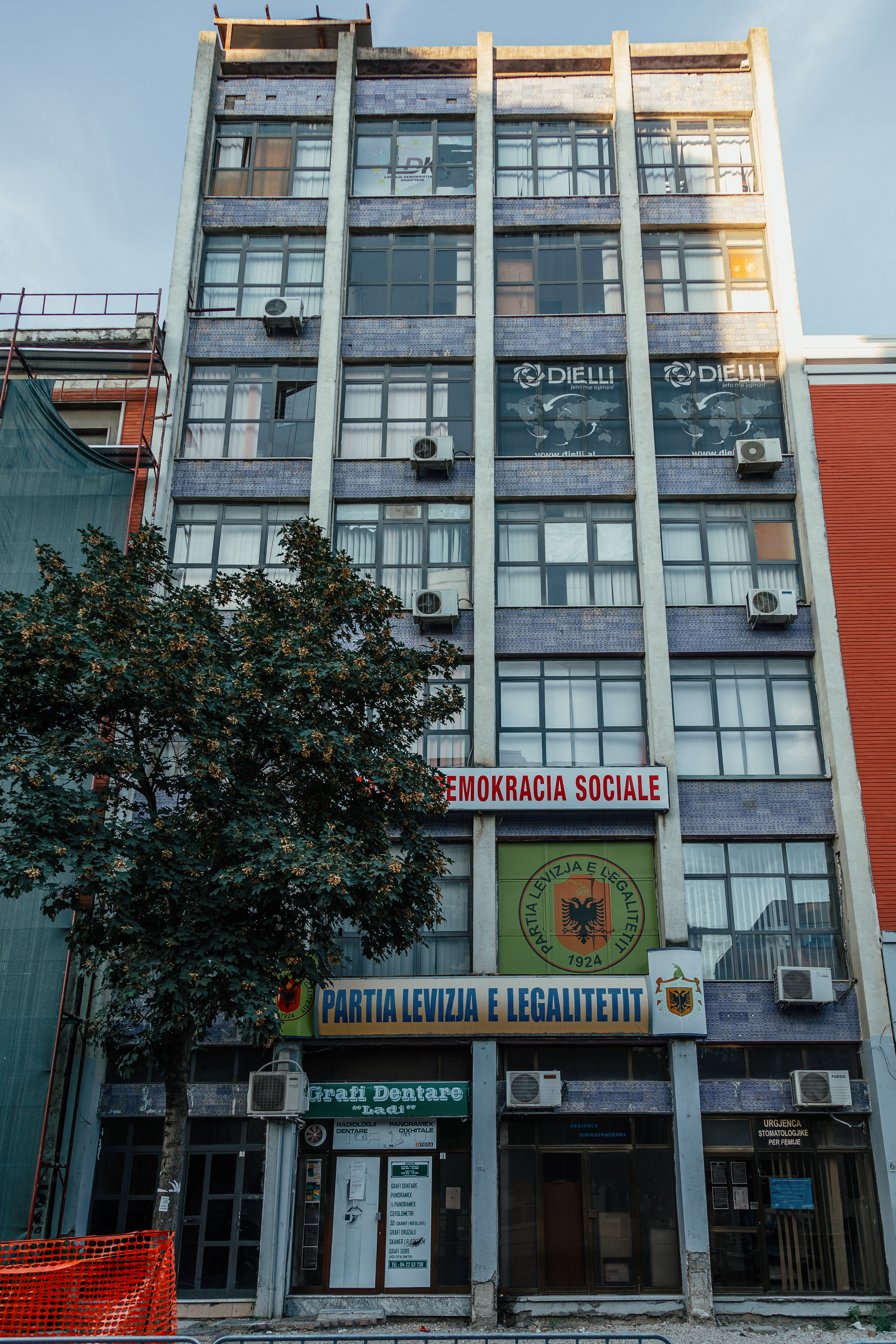
Former headquarters of ATSH

ATSH became the official central information institution of the People's Socialist Republic of Albania, voice of the Labour Party (PPSH) and the socialist state. It was set up immediately after the country's liberation from World War II to collect, process and disseminate information on the ideological, economic, cultural and social activity that took place in Albania, as well as on the political and social events around the world. ATSH was the main source of information for the Party's propaganda, for the Albanian press, radio and television and as a center for the processing of press materials from foreign agencies. Under the supervision of Thanas Nano, the activity of ATSH was based solely on the Marxist-Leninist principles of the labour party and the teachings of comrade Enver Hoxha for popular journalism. It conveyed to the working masses the policy of the party, presented its achievements in all fields of socialist construction in Albania and the defence of the homeland. The agency published daily and periodical newsletters of domestic and foreign news. It had correspondents in all districts and its photographic service popularized various activities that took place throughout the country.

=== Internet era ===
In 1993, the UNDP set up a system for the agency to go online internally with PTT lines. The first exchange of information using email was made by ATSH in 1995, where the sending of information was done through the agency TEL–PRESS. During this time, the usage of paper was being phased out and the teletext service through which the transmission was carried out took over. The ATSH website was created in that same year and redesigned again three years later, in 1998. It published news in three languages: Albanian, French and English. Initially the website had only non-video and audio content but after 1998, other elements were introduced such as videos and photos, thus formatted on the basis of enriching the new media genres. The new technology implemented in this institution brought a new perspective on how to treat information, which was based on freedom of writing and the removal of censorship, enabling the increase of information and materials that were transmitted here. The editorial offices covered news and everyday events ranging from politics, the economy, cultural life, sports, etc.

=== Reorganization ===
- Press Office at the MFA and the MIA (1927–1939)
- General Directorate of Press, Propaganda and Tourism (1939–1941)
- Branch of the Ministry of Popular Culture (1941–1944)
- Telegraphic Agency (1945–present)

== Directors (1927–present) ==
No.	Name	Term in office
1	Mihal Sherko	25 July 1927	7 April 1939
2	Thanas Nano	1945	16 April 1959
3	Ajet Simixhiu	16 April 1959
4	Arqile Aleksi
5	Taqo Zoto
6	Ilir Zhilla	1992	5 August 1997
7	Frrok Çupi	5 August 1997	8 November 2005
8	Edi Paloka	8 November 2005	24 October 2007
9	Artur Kopani	24 October 2007	2 July 2008
10	Antoneta Malja	2 July 2008	14 October 2009
11	Artur Zheji	14 October 2009	17 April 2012
12	Gëzim Podgorica	2012	24 April 2013
13	Basir Çollaku	24 April 2013	28 October 2013
14	Gëzim Podgorica	28 October 2013	18 October 2017
15	Armela Krasniqi	18 October 2017	8 July 2021
16	Valbona Zhupa	8 July 2021	Incumbent
