= Freedom of the press in Timor-Leste =

Freedom of the press in Timor-Leste is protected by section 41 of the Constitution of Timor-Leste.

After gaining its independence from Indonesia in 2002, there was little discord between the Timor-Leste press and the government. However, after 2005, the Timor-Leste government was more active in attempting to suppress anti-government sentiment in several of the country's newspapers, leading the rights group Freedom House to downgrade its press status from "Free" to "Partly Free" in its 2006 report.

== Background ==
In 2005, Reporters Without Borders said Timor-Leste had one of the most liberal press environments in Asia. However, that same year, parliament gave the executive authority to enact a new penal law that criminalized defamation and dramatically increased penalties for defaming government officials.

The move was the first in a series of steps by the government against news outlets and journalists that wrote about issues such as corruption and widespread hunger. The effort would later include criminal indictments against some of the country's most prominent journalists. These indictments, and Timor-Leste's legal restrictions on the press, have been widely criticized by press freedom groups around the world.

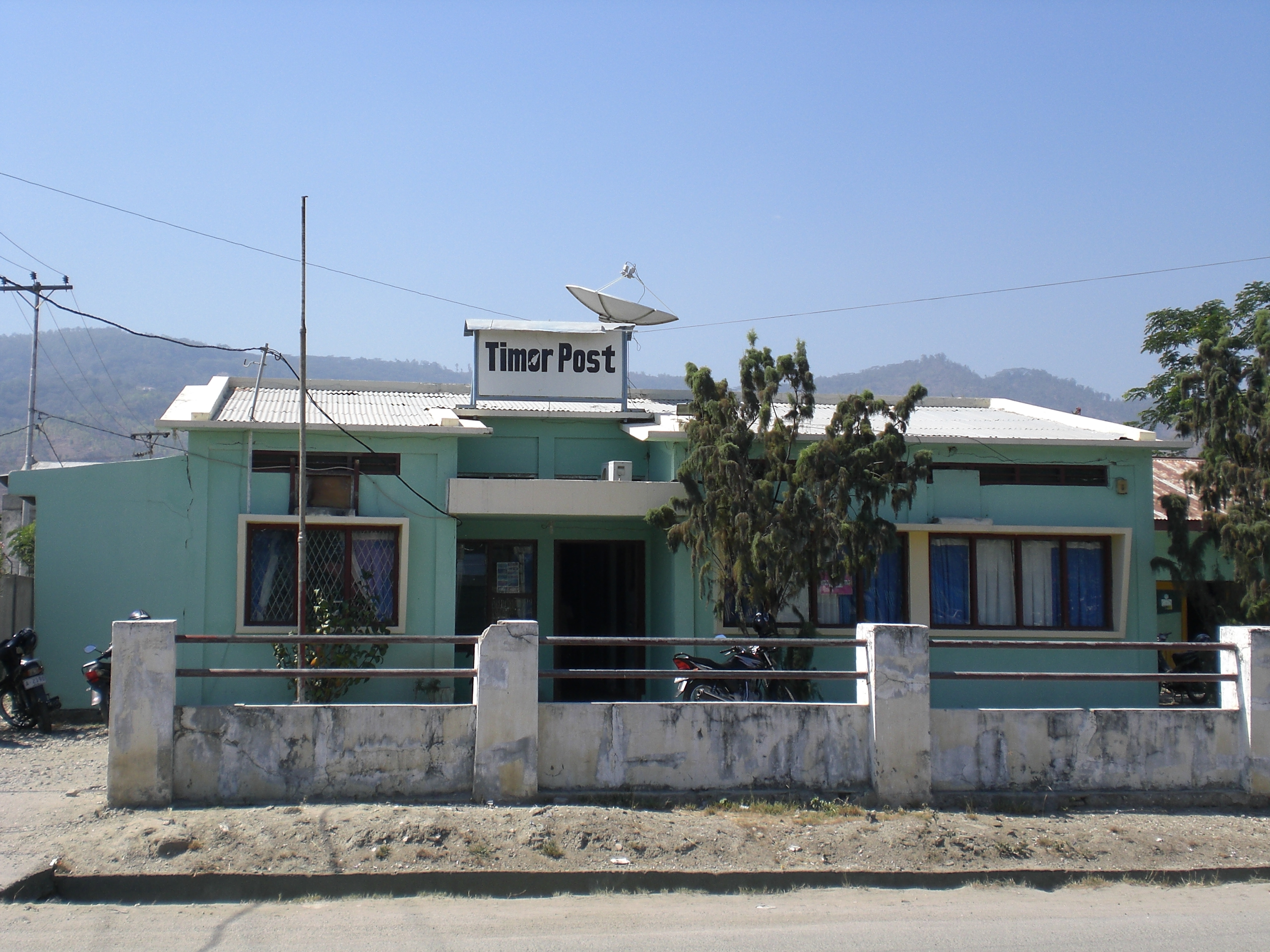
Timor Post headquarters in Dili

One early sign of the changing environment was the government's 2005 treatment of the daily newspaper Suara Timor Lorosae for its coverage of a famine in the country. In response, the government evicted the newspaper from its offices, halted government advertising in the newspaper, banned officials from speaking with Suara Timor Lorosae reporters, and ordered government agencies to boycott the publication.

In 2007, the newspaper's offices were attacked during a period of political tension, according to the Committee to Protect Journalists. In 2009 and 2015, high-ranking officials in the government brought criminal defamation charges against investigative journalists who reported on corruption. A 2014 media law passed by parliament was widely criticized by journalists in Timor-Leste and press freedom groups when members of the government began using criminal defamation laws to prosecute journalists who reported on corruption.

== 2013 Media Code Proposal ==
In October 2013, a group of approximately 150 East Timorese journalists gathered in Dili, the country's capital. The assembled journalists voted on a proposal about journalistic self-regulation within the country. Included in this proposal was a 10-point code of ethics that addressed issues of freedom of expression, confidentiality of sources, and accuracy in reporting. The code was also put in place to curb the common practice of government officials paying journalists to report on them and their policies in a favorable manner.

== 2014 Media Code Amendment ==
On May 6, 2014, the Timor-Leste Parliament amended the 2013 Media Code and drafted new certification requirements for journalists in the country. The new law would make journalists go through a training process with a press organization that has been certified by the official government Press Council. This training process would take from six to 18 months.

=== New provisions ===
Article 9 in the document states: “1) Everyone has the freedom to express and disseminate their ideas through the media. 2) No one shall be disquieted for their political, philosophical, religious or other opinions.” Some have cited provisions in Article 17 that seem to contradict the statements in Article 9. This article excludes civil servants, advertisers, political leaders or office-holders from practicing journalism “concurrently” with their occupation. In Chapter 8 of the document, details of the new Press Council are outlined. The article states the council will be made up of five people who have the power to “Exercise disciplinary authority over journalists,” and “Grant, renew, suspend and revoke the professional credentials of journalists.”

==== Criticism ====
After the new law was passed by parliament, it was sharply criticized by various press freedom groups. Human Rights Watch (HRW) called on the government to “eliminate the Media Act’s Requirement of an official Press Council and its requisite listing of journalists in favor of media self-regulation.” Some members of the International Federation of Journalists (IFJ) called the law "draconian", and sent a petition to the Timor-Leste Government, urging them to strike down the law. Because of the 2014 law, Timor-Leste dropped 26 places to 103rd place out of 180 countries on the Reporters Without Borders World Press Freedom Index. It was the second-sharpest drop on the list behind Andorra, which fell 27 places.

==== Appeal ====
In response to widespread criticism of the law, in July 2014, Timor-Leste President Taur Matan Ruak, who had not yet signed the bill, sent the proposal to Timor-Leste's Court of Appeal to determine its constitutionality. In August 2014, the Court of Appeal found several aspects of the media law to be unconstitutional and was sent back to Timor-Leste's parliament. As of October 2016, no more significant action has been taken by Timor-Leste's Government to amend the bill.

== Indicted journalists ==
=== Jose Belo ===
In 2008, Timor-Leste Minister of Justice Lucia Lobato accused Jose Belo, publisher of investigative newspaper Tempo Semanal of defamation. At the time, many of the press laws in East Timor were inherited from Indonesian military rule. In a number of articles in Tempo Semanal, Belo accused Lobato of corruption and using her power to get friends and family members into high-paying government positions.

In response, Lobato brought a defamation charge against Belo using an Indonesian-era law that made defamation a criminal offense. Lobato was criticized by many members of the Timor-Leste press, as she and other members of the Timor-Leste government were in the process of drafting a new law that downgraded defamation to a civil rather than criminal offense. Under the old law, Belo faced a possible prison sentence of seven years. Belo said “It’s very sad for my country that they keep using foreign invader’s laws to prosecute me. We should have our own laws.”

After the Timor-Leste Government pressed charges against Belo, several press freedom groups criticized the Timor-Leste Government for limiting press freedoms. Some of these groups include East Timor and Indonesia Action Network (ETAN), Pacific Media Watch (PMW), and the Australian Centre for Independent Journalism (ACIJ) who sent a letter to Timor-Leste's President José Ramos-Horta urging him to drop the charges against Belo.

==== Court decision ====
Ultimately, outside support for Belo helped his case. In June 2009, Ramos-Horta passed a law that removed defamation as a criminal offense. Soon after, charges against Belo and the Tempo Semanal were dismissed.

=== Raimundos Oki ===
On November 10, 2015, freelance reporter Raimundos Oki wrote an article for the Timor Post in which he accused Timor-Leste Prime Minister Rui Maria de Araújo of possible “bid rigging” in a government computer contract. In this case, Oki contends that Araujo had a history of this practice, and according to internal government documents, he gave preferential treatment to a particular technological firm—Packet Sistemindonesia Teknotama (PT).

==== Defamation charges ====
After the story's release, the government claimed Oki had released the story with a “factual error” by misspelling the name of technology firm, PT. On November 17, 2015, The Timor Post issued a correction with the accurate spelling of PT and printed a written response from the prime minister's office, defending itself against the accusations. In January 2016, the Timor-Leste Government charged Oki with criminal defamation charges. Oki faces a maximum sentence of three years in jail if convicted.

==== Outside support ====
As in the case of Jose Belo, many press freedom groups have voiced their support for Oki. The IFJ, CPJ, and Freedom House are just a few who have reached out to the Timor-Leste Government. In a letter sent to Prime Minister de Araujo in April 2016, they urged him to drop charges against Oki and his former editor, Lourenco Martins. In a response letter to the group, Araujo said: “I will not trade press freedom and freedom of expression with ‘press irresponsibility’ and ‘irresponsible expression of freedom.”
