= Korrieri =

- Type: Daily newspaper
- Format: Berliner
- Founded: 28 March 2001
- Ceased publication: 2009 (active online)
- Political alignment: Unaffiliated center left
- Language: Albanian
- Circulation: 8,000 (2002)
- Website: Korrieri

Korrieri (English: Courier) was an Albanian language daily newspaper. Lately, it has transformed into an online news portal.

== History and profile ==
Established on 28 March 2001 as a berliner type publication, Korrieri was for a period (April 2007 - January 2009) on the front line of transforming Albanian journalism into a more market-driven activity exhibiting a British tabloid style newspaper which offered a vast range of articles of popular interest. Its style at the time was aggressive and direct and it very often published issues other publications will not touch. It had a high reputation among the young generation, but also it was highly respectable and strongly influential into the political levels. In March 2006, the student newspaper Reporteri became its fortnightly supplement on Saturdays. Elton Metaj served as the editor-in-chief of Korrieri which has no political affiliation and a center left political leaning.

The publisher of Korrieri was Media 5 Ltd. of which the majority share was owned by the Media 6 JSC.

In January 2009 the direction board of the paper decided on a return to mainstream journalism, causing the interruption of all ongoing projects of transformation and returning Korrieri into a middle-low level newspaper as it was before its short golden period.

In 2009 the new administration of Korrieri announced its bankruptcy and shutdown.

Korrieri had a circulation of 8,000 copies in 2002.

== See also ==
- List of newspapers in Albania
- News in Albania
