= Gazeta Telegraf =

Albanian daily newspaper

- Type: Daily newspaper
- Founded: 2005; 21 years ago
- Language: Albanian
- Headquarters: Tirana
- Website: telegraf.al

Gazeta Telegraf is an Albanian language daily newspaper published in Tirana, Albania.

== History and profile ==
Gazeta Telegraf was established in 2005. The paper is based in Tirana.
