= Sporti Shqiptar =

- Type: Sport
- Format: Tabloid
- Founder(s): Luigj Shala, Anton Mazreku
- Founded: 28 November 1935
- Language: Albanian
- Headquarters: Tirana, Albania
- Website: www.sportishqiptar.com.al

Sporti Shqiptar (English: Albanian Sport) was a newspaper published in Albania.

== History ==
Sporti Shqiptar was established on 28 November 1935 by Luigj Shala and Anton Mazreku and was considered at the time the first sports publication in the region. The paper survived following the collapse of the communist regime in Albania.

Its headquarters were in Tirana, Albania. The newspaper mainly published articles about events in the Albanian Superliga and the Albanian Cup and other European leagues.

== See also ==
- List of newspapers in Albania
