= Bledi Kasmi =

Albanian journalist

Bledi Kasmi is the editor in chief of Rilindja Demokratike.

== Information ==
Kasmi is also member of Tirana County and the Tirana Municipal Council.
