= Laiko Vima =

Newspaper in Albania

Λαϊκό Βήμα
- Type: bi weekly newspaper
- Founded: 1945
- Language: Greek
- Headquarters: Gjirokastër
- Website: laikovima.com

Laiko Vima (Greek: Λαϊκό Βήμα, "People's Tribune") is a bi-weekly newspaper published in Gjirokastër, that serves the local Greek communities in Albania. It was founded in 1945 and was the only newspaper printed in the Greek language during the Socialist People's Republic of Albania.

== Background ==
After World War II, Albania as part of the Eastern Bloc, was governed by a Communist regime led by Enver Hoxha. Communist Albania was one of the last surviving Stalinist regimes worldwide, in which press remained under tight dictatorial control until the collapse of the Eastern Bloc political class.

This regime suppressed the local Greek communities, and took measures to disperse it or at least keep it loyal to Albania. Under these circumstances, ethnic Greeks, who are traditionally concentrated in parts of the country's south (Northern Epirus), were subject to serious human rights abuses, particularly in terms of religious freedom, education in Greek language and freedom of publication.

== Founding and censorship (1945–1991) ==
Laiko Vima was founded on 25 May 1945, by the local branch of the Party of Labour of Albania and was the only newspaper in the Greek language for the needs of the local communities. Laiko Vima was published in Gjirokastër, home to large number of Greek minority members, and was distributed only to Gjirokastër District. The newspaper was an organ of the local branch of the Party of Labour, and every article was subject to heavy censorship.

In 1956 Laiko Vima started to host a literary page, initially edited by Panos Tsoukas, who was an active member of the Party of Labour. During 1960–1968 the literary page was suspended but reappeared in 1968–1988, this time edited by the poet Andreas Zarbalas. From 1988 to 1991 it evolved into a separate literary magazine with the title: The people's literary tribune (Greek: Λογοτεχνικό Λαϊκό Βήμα). This featured poems and prose pieces by both established and new writers, for whom it functioned as the antechamber for further publishing. Moreover, various poems used allegory and metaphors in order to evade censorship.

In 1970, after 25 years of circulation, the newspaper was awarded by Enver Hoxha as having played a major role in the revolutionary education of the Greek minority.

== Post-communist period ==
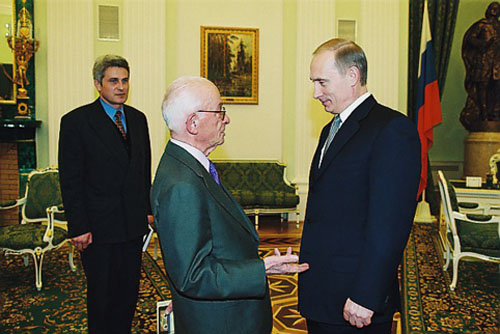
Vladimir Putin with editor of the Vima newspaper Efstathios Efstathiadis

In early 1991, following the fall of the communist regime and liberalization in Albania, Laiko Vima continued to be published but now as a private newspaper owned by local Greeks in Gjirokastër. Besides Laiko Vima, which is still in circulation, several other Greek newspapers as well as magazines are published in the areas in which ethnic Greek communities live and are also available in parts of nearby Greece.

== See also ==
- Eastern Bloc information dissemination
- Greek Culture in Albania
- Newspapers in Albania

== Sources ==
- Frantzi, Anteia (2006). "Literature and National Consciousness of the Greek Minority in Northern Epirus". The Historical Review/La Revue Historique. 3: 205–214. doi:10.12681/hr.204. Aristotle University of Thessaloniki-Institute of Neohellenic Research.
