= Gazeta 55 =

Daily newspaper

Gazeta 55 Newspaper 55

- Gazeta 55 on 27 September 2010
- Type: daily newspaper
- Format: Berliner
- Owner: Fahri Balliu (1997-present)
- Founder: Fahri Balliu
- Publisher: Gazeta 55
- Editor-in-chief: Ilir Nikolla
- Staff writers: Fahri Balliu
- Founded: 18 October 1997; 28 years ago
- Political alignment: Anti-communist
- Language: Albanian
- Headquarters: Medar Shylla Street, Tirana, Albania
- Website: www.55news.al

Gazeta 55 (English: Newspaper 55) is an Albanian language newspaper published in Tirana, Albania. The newspaper is a politically unaffiliated daily, with nine reporters on staff records. The tabloid's owner is Fahri Balliu, an Albanian businessman.

== History and profile ==
Gazeta 55 was first published on 18 October 1997.

At the beginning of the 2000s Gazeta 55 had a circulation of 4,500 copies.

== Name ==
The number "55" was chosen because Article 55 of the Constitution of communist Albania, dealt with Agitation and Propaganda related crimes.

== Content ==
=== Sections ===
The newspaper is organised in three sections, including the magazine.

1. News: Includes International, National, Tirana, Politics, Business, Technology, Science, Health, Sports, Education.
2. Opinion: Includes Editorials, Op-Eds and Letters to the Editor.
3. Features: Includes Arts, Movies, Theatre, and a Sigurimi file (mainly about the communist era)

=== Web presence ===
Gazeta 55 has had a web presence since 2008. Accessing articles requires no registration, and the whole newspaper is available in PDF. The online editor is Leonard Quku.

== See also ==
- List of newspapers in Albania
- News in Albania
