= Mesazhieri =

Newspaper in Albania

- Founder: Ndue Pjetra
- Publisher: Ndue Pjetra
- Editor: Suarda Dalipi
- Language: Albanian

Mesazhieri is a business newspaper published in Albania. It is published by No & Al, edited by Ilir Pjetra Ndue Bush. Lately it became an investigative newspaper, published by "Gimaj Construction" sh.pk, and directed by Ndue Pjetra.
