= Rimëkëmbja =

Newspaper in Albania

- Language: Albanian

Rimëkëmbja (meaning the Recovery in English) is an Albanian language newspaper published in Albania.

== Profile ==
Rimëkëmbja is owned by Abdi Baleta who is a member of the Party of the National Recovery (Rimëkëmbja Kombëtare in Albanian).
