= Tatoli =

State-run news agency of Timor-Leste

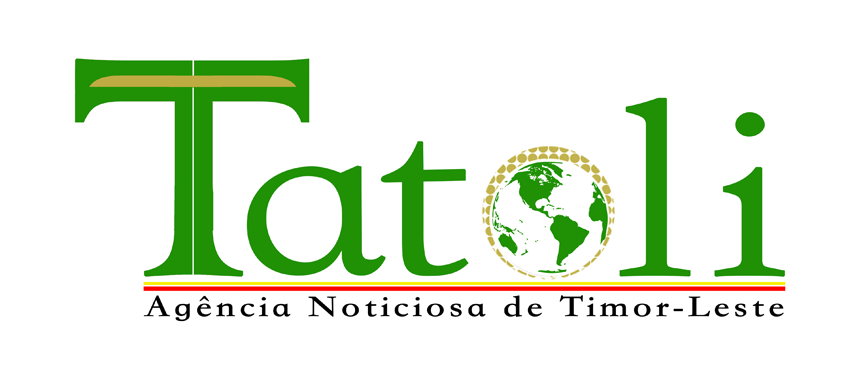
- Type: News agency
- Country: Timor-Leste
- Headquarters: Dili, Timor-Leste
- Launch date: 27 July 2016; 10 years ago
- Former names: Timor-Leste News Agency (2016-2017)
- Official website: Tatoli (in English)
- Language: Portuguese, Tetum, English, Indonesian

Tatoli, formerly known as Timor-Leste News Agency (Portuguese: Agência Noticiosa de Timor-Leste (ANTIL)), is the official state run news agency of Timor-Leste. It was launched on 27 July 2016. The word "Tatoli" is Tetum in origin, and means "to entrust someone (something/a message) to be passed on; passing on (something/a message) for someone".

In 2012, it was announced that Portuguese news agency Lusa would carry out a feasibility study into the creation of an East Timorese news agency. In 2013, Lusa presented a proposal for a suitable Portuguese-Timorese operating partnership. The establishment of an East Timorese news agency was flagged in the Government Program in March 2015, and approved by the Council of Ministers on 3 February 2016.

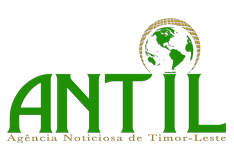
Timor-Leste News Agency (ANTIL) logo used from 2016 to 2017

When the agency was launched, the then Secretary of State for Social Communication, Nélio Isaac Sarmento, said that its main objective is not to compete with other media representatives, but to complement information based on data and facts, and therefore to be a reference to media bodies and professionals. Upon its establishment, the agency became a member of the Alliance of Portuguese Language Information Agencies (Portuguese: Aliança das Agências de Informação de Língua Portuguesa (ALP)). In 2017, it became a public institute, and changed its name to Tatoli.

The agency offers its news service in four languages – Portuguese, English, Indonesian and Tetum, the national language of Timor – and also text, photo and video streaming services, including by interface for viewing on mobile platforms.
