= Rilindja Demokratike =

Albanian newspaper

Rilindja Demokratike Democratic Rebirth

- Rilindja Demokratike on 6 November 2013
- Type: Daily Newspaper
- Format: Berliner
- Owner: Democratic Party of Albania
- Editor-in-chief: Bledi Kasmi
- Founded: 5 January 1991; 35 years ago
- Political alignment: Part of Democratic Party of Albania
- Language: Albanian
- Headquarters: Tirana
- Circulation: Present: 3.000 (2014); Record: 125.000 (1991)
- Website: rdnews.al

Rilindja Demokratike (English: Democratic Rebirth and short RD) is an Albanian newspaper founded and continuously published in Tirana. Rilindja Demokratike is the official newspaper of the Democratic Party of Albania. Its chief editor is Bledi Kasmi. Its first publication was on 5 January 1991 and was the first free newspaper since the Fall of communism in Albania, while it functioned against the state newspaper Zëri i Popullit what was the newspaper of the Communist Party and nowadays of the Socialist Party. RD was also the first media in Albania that openly criticized the regime of Enver Hoxha

RD still holds the record of most published newspaper in Albania, with a circulation of 125.000 copies in 1991. Together with Gazeta 55 it is the only right winged news paper, but RD is considered the main opposition newspaper.

== History ==
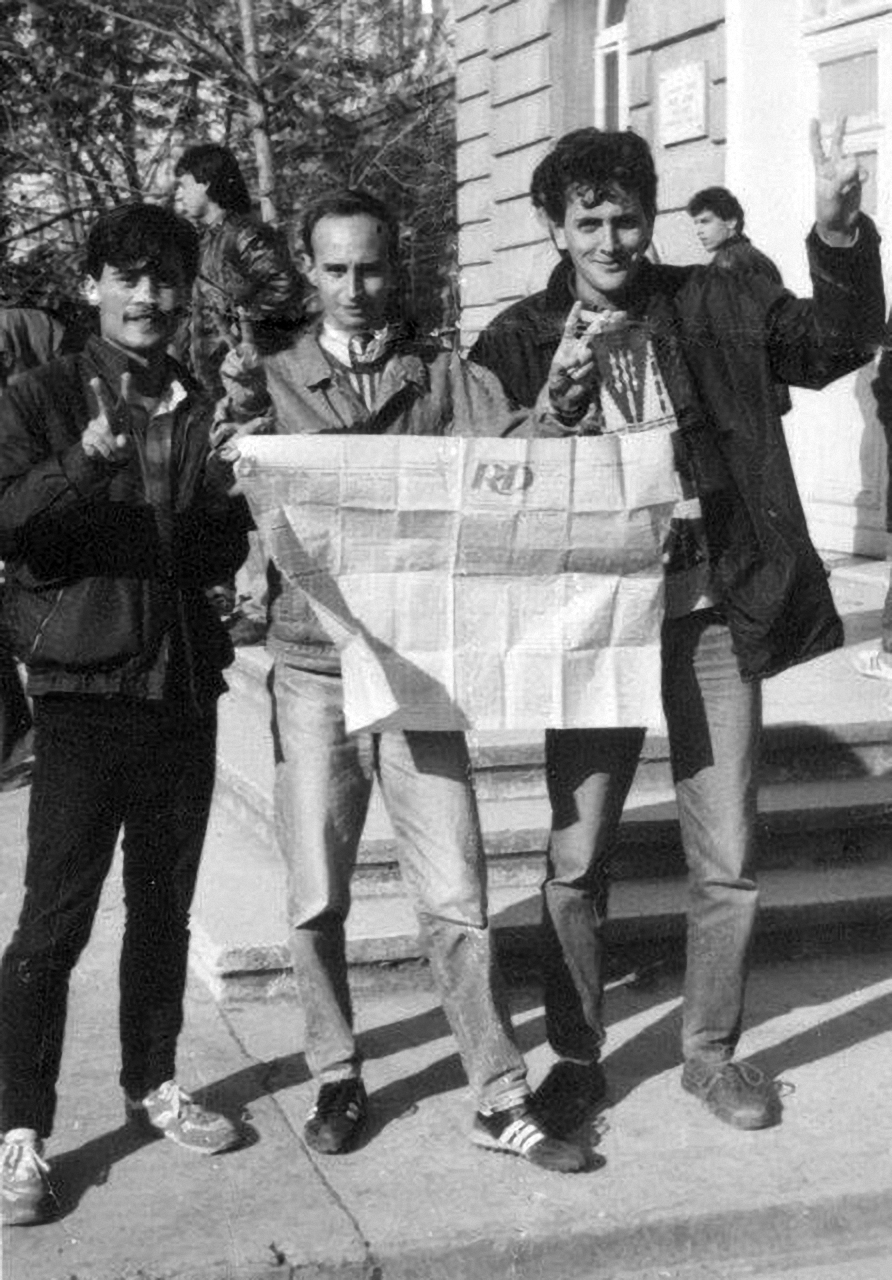
First copy of RD newspaper held by some people on 5 January 1991.

Huge political reforms took place in Albania, and the Communist regime in power was forced to allow small opposition groups in its political system. After the fall of communism in Albania the Democratic Party (DP) on 11 December 1990 no free media was published in Albania. On 5 January 1991 the first issue of RD was published in Albania, ordered by Sali Berisha, at that leader of the DP. RD started to function against the state newspaper Zëri i Popullit what was the newspaper of the Communist Party and nowadays of the Socialist Party.

In the beginning, RD was published twice a week, but was later converted to a daily newspaper. The circulation of the paper was in the beginning around 70-100 thousand copies, while people interested in the newspaper had to wait in lines to get a copy. Its 2005 circulation was 10,000 copies, making it the third most read daily in the country. In the first numbers RD oriented to the values of freedom, democracy, free market and anti-self-understanding. There were left pages to former politically persecuted and former owners, who by this action got for the first time in history a voice in the country.

The first words of the newspaper were "Today, the Democratic Renaissance says its first words. This Renaissance has a big task and great importance. It has taken the duty to say the right things." Its first issue was sold by the price of 1 Leke.

== Content ==
=== Sections ===
The newspaper is organized in seven sections, including the magazine Ekspres.al.

1. Politics: Includes articles about the political situation of Albania.
2. News: Includes non-political news of Albania.
3. Economy & Social: Includes relevant economic news and on social topics
4. Opinion: Includes Editorials and Opinion pieces.
5. Features: Includes feature articles of the magazine Eskpres.al.
6. Health: Includes newest medical findings and tips.
7. Sport: Includes news that is sport related.

=== Style ===
When referring to people, Rilindja Demokratike generally uses honorifics, rather than unadorned last names (except in the sports pages, Book Review and Magazine). In the early years it used a four-column format, but switched to five-column format.

=== Opinion pieces ===
One of the main elements of RD are the opinion pieces published daily. Usually, two opinion pages are published. Although the authors of the opinion pieces are not scheduled, some of its main contributors are Bledi Kasmi, Basir Çollaku, Hamit Taka, and Hyqmet Zane for RD. It is interesting to notice that RD have been over the time a starting point for many politicians of the Democratic Party, like Astrid Patozi, Edi Paloka and Gent Strazimiri.

=== Web presence ===
Rilindja Demokratike has had a web presence since 2005. Accessing articles does not require registration. Only the front page can be downloaded in pdf-format, the papers articles can be accessed only on the website. Since 2013, RD has a new website.

== Editor in chief ==
The first editor was Frrok Çupi, who was fired in June 1991 after disagreeing with party head Sali Berisha. Çupi later blamed people who had "adopted Enver’s tactics very well.” After he left, Napoleon Roshi took the lead of RD. He was a former director of Foreign Radio and former journalist at "Union", then Mitro Çela, will lead the newspaper till the end of 1991 until the successful campaign of 22 March 1992.

In April 1992, Bashkim Trenova was the editor in chief until the end of 1994, when the position was taken by Lorenc Ligori, spokesman for the Democratic Party in that time. In the autumn of 1995 RD will be administered by Lazer Stani until March 12, 1997, after which will be overtaken by Xhevat Mustafa, who will remain in office until May 1997, when he was replaced by Astrit Patozi, former editor of Albania. Patozi ran the newspaper until July 2005, when he would be elected a member of the Democratic Party in the Parliament. From this time onwards newspaper RD was directed by journalist Bledi Kasmi.

== Incidents and legal cases ==
- Mujo Bucpapaj, a journalist of RD was shot and injured on 20 August 1998. He was shot down by a person that moved with a police vehicle. Genc Pollo, accused the government of the Socialist Party for the responsibility of this incident.
- During the opposition of the Democratic Party in 2000, 3 journalists where legally prosecuted by the Albanian justice system. Astrit Patozi, Redin Hafizi and Shemsi Peposhi were prosecuted for several articles published in RD. Hafizi fled to the United States to receive political asylum.
- Erion Veliaj started a legal case against RD. He lost this case in court.
- On 16 April 2013, Telnis Skuqi got threatened to get killed after he published an investigative article about the drug planes in Albania. He was threatened again three days later on 19 April 2013 by an unknown attacker. Someone threw the cut off head of a goat in front of his house.

== See also ==
- Democratic Party of Albania
