= +2 Radio =

- Albania
- Broadcast area: Albania - National FM
- Frequencies: 101.6 MHz in Tirana region, rest of world - (via the Internet)

Programming
- Format: Defunct (was Pop)

Ownership
- Owner: Privately owned

History
- First air date: February 25, 1998

+2 Radio is a defunct national private radio station operating in Albania that targeted younger audiences. Also, a part of BMN, a local radio network made up of 7 radio stations broadcasting in the Albanian speaking territories of the Balkans. +2 Radio's signal covered 68 percent of Albania.
