= Suara Timor Lorosae =

Newspaper in East Timor

- Mata dalan ba sociedade livre (Guiding for the free society)
- Type: Daily newspaper
- Format: Broadsheet
- Owner: STL Corporation
- Founded: February 1, 1993; 32 years ago
- Ceased publication: September 4, 1999
- Relaunched: July 31, 2000
- Language: Tetum
- Headquarters: Dili
- Country: East Timor
- Circulation: 3,000
- Website: stltimorleste.com

Suara Timor Lorosae (English: The Voice of East Timor, abbreviated as STL) is a daily newspaper published in Dili, Timor-Leste. The current publication is the continuation of Suara Timor Timur, which ceased publication in 1999.

== History ==
Suara Timor Lorosae was first published as Suara Timor Timur (an Indonesian name with the same translation as above), a daily newspaper in the former Indonesian province of East Timor. It was first published on 1 February 1993, at the same date of Xanana Gusmão first day of trial in Dili district court. The paper's coverage on Xanana Gusmão's trial has mentioned in the report of United Nations Secretary General Boutros Boutros-Ghali to the United Nations General Assembly. The original motto was Persatuan dan Pembangunan (Unity and Development), later changed to Menyuarakan Kebenaran dan Keadilan (Voicing the Truth and Justice).

Suara Timor Timur published its last edition on 3 September 1999 and fully stopped its publication a day later due to the massive looting, destruction and burning by the pro-Indonesia militia following the independence referendum. Consequently, all facilities of the newspaper such as building, printing machines and thousands of tons of newsprint were totally destroyed and burnt down.

The newspaper was revived on 25 May 2000, this time as Suara Timor Lorosae. It was decided to keep the word Suara, which is the Indonesian word for "voice", as Suara Timor Timur was well known and part of history of the rebirth paper. The main name differences is the word Timur (in Indonesian) is changed to Lorosae (in Tetum), both means "east", and the words A Voz de (Portuguese for "voice") above the word Suara, thus the name can also be read as A Voz de Timor Lorosae with the same meaning.

== Overview ==
Suara Timor Lorosae is owned by STL Corporation, a company that also owns other media such as STL TV and STL Radio FM (RSTL).

As of 2012, its daily circulation is around 3,000 copies, in the case of special events the circulation can increased to 5,000. According to an agreement, 800 copies are made available to the government for distribution to all sucos in the country in order to provide information to local administrators.

According to 2011 UNESCO data Suara Timor Lorosae was the largest daily newspaper in East Timor with a reader share of 44%, ahead of Timor Post with 38%.

Key people include Salvador Ximenes Soares, a former Golkar politician in the Indonesian parliament, and Domingos Saldanha, the co-publisher and editor-in-chief of the paper who is related to Estanislau de Sousa Saldanha, the former rector of the Dili Institute of Technology and João Mariano Saldanha, the founder of Republican Party.

== See also ==
- List of newspapers in Timor-Leste
