= Metropol (newspaper) =

Newspaper published in Albania

- Publisher: Ing. Alban Xhaferi
- Editor: Brahim Shima
- Founded: 9 May 2004
- Language: Albanian

Metropol is a newspaper published in Albania. It is a tabloid style daily published first on 9 May 2004. Metropol is owned by Ing. Alban Xhaferi and its editor is Brahim Shima.
