= Radio KLF =

Former Finnish radio station

Radio KLF was a radio station based in Helsinki, broadcasting on FM on the frequencies 100.0 MHz (Helsinki), 101.9 MHz (Turku), 101.6 MHz (Tampere) and 98.1 MHz Oulu. It mainly played dance music.
