= Shekulli =

Newspaper

- Type: Daily Newspaper
- Format: Berliner
- Owner: Koço Kokëdhima
- Editor-in-chief: Koço Kokëdhima
- Founded: 12 September 1997; 28 years ago
- Political alignment: Unaffiliated center left
- Language: Albanian
- Headquarters: Tirana, Albania
- Circulation: 9000 (2017)
- Website: shekulli.com.al

Gazeta Shekulli (English: Century Newspaper) is a daily newspaper published in Albania. The paper is owned by the media group UNIPRESS sh.p.k Its headquarters is located in Tirana, Albania.

== See also ==
- List of newspapers in Albania
- News in Albania
