= Albania Today =

Newspaper in Albania

- Founded: 1996; 29 years ago
- Language: English

Albania Today was an English language daily newspaper published in Albania. The paper was established in 1996.
