= Gazeta Tema =

Newspaper in Albania

Tema

- Tema frontpage on 24 October 2010
- Type: Daily newspaper
- Format: Broadsheet
- Founder: Mero Baze
- Editor-in-chief: Mero Baze
- Founded: 1999
- Political alignment: unaffiliated
- Language: Albanian English
- Headquarters: Tirana
- Circulation: 5,000 (Daily)
- Website: www.gazetatema.net

Gazeta Tema (Albanian: [gaˈzeta ˈtema]; stylised as short TemA; lit. 'the topic') is a politically unaffiliated daily newspaper published in Tirana, Albania in the Albanian language. Founded in July 1999, TemA is one of the oldest daily newspapers in Albania and currently sells about 15,000 daily copies nationwide.

Tema Online is the online version of Tema daily newspaper is currently one of the most popular websites in Albania, offering news, comments and entertainment. The website has on average 800,000 to 1,000,000 visits per day according to TemA.

TemA Online also provides an English edition for its international readers and expats. Gazeta TemA has become well known for breaking several high-profile cases such as the personal involvement of the son of former Prime Minister Salih Berisha in arm deals for Afghan soldiers, the privatisation of the Albanian state oil refinery ARMO oil refiner by controversial Albanian businessman Rezart Taçi, the publishing of leaked nude pictures of current Prime Minister Edi Rama etc.

The relentless scrutiny and criticism of governmental policies has also taken its toll on TemA newspaper. That is when the newspaper turned its total attention to pioneering online media and only returned its print version in 2011, thus becoming one of the most popular online news outlets in Albania.

== Content ==
=== Sections ===
The newspaper is organised in three sections, including the magazine.

1. News: Includes International, National, Tirana, Politics, Business, Technology, Science, Health, Sports, Education.
2. Opinion: Includes Editorials, Op-Eds and Letters to the Editor.
3. Features: Includes Arts, Movies, Theatre, and Sport.

=== Web presence ===
Tema has had a web presence since 1999. Accessing articles requires no registration. The website has on average 800,000 to 1,000,000 visits per day according to TemA. The newspaper is also available in PDF.
