= Gazeta Shqiptare =

Newspaper in Albania

- Type: Daily newspaper
- Format: Berliner
- Owner: Hysenbelliu Group
- Founded: 1927; 98 years ago
- Political alignment: Independent
- Language: Albanian
- Website: gazetashqiptare.al

Gazeta Shqiptare (English: Albanian Newspaper) is the oldest independent Albanian-language newspaper published in Albania.

== History ==
Founded in 1927, the paper's publication would cease 12 years later, following the fascist Italian invasion of 1939. The paper resumed publishing on 22 April 1993.

Gazeta Shqiptare had a circulation of 9,677 copies in the early 2000s.

== See also ==
- List of newspapers in Albania
- News in Albania
