= Panorama (Albania) =

Newspaper in Albania

Gazeta Panorama
- Type: Daily newspaper
- Founded: 2002; 24 years ago
- Political alignment: Independent
- Language: Albanian
- Headquarters: Tirana
- Website: www.panorama.com.al

Gazeta Panorama is a newspaper published in Albania. Published by Panorama, it is the largest newspaper in the country and its online portal/website is the most visited website in Albanian territory.

== Content ==
=== Sections ===
The newspaper is organised in three sections, including the magazine.

1. News: Includes International, National, Tirana, Politics, Business, Technology, Science, Health, Sports, Education.
2. Opinion: Includes Editorials, Op-Eds.
3. Features: Includes Arts, Movies, Theatre, and Sport.

=== Web presence ===
Gazeta Panorama has had a web presence since 2004.
