= Koha Jonë =

Newspaper in Albania

Koha Jonë Our Time

- Koha Jonë on 27 September 2010
- Type: Phablet
- Format: Broadsheet
- Owner: Nikollë Lesi
- Founder: Nikollë Lesi
- Publisher: Nikollë Lesi
- Editor-in-chief: Daniel Muçaku
- Associate editor: Daniel Muçaku
- News editor: Redjon Shtylla
- Opinion editor: Albert Vataj
- Founded: 11 May 1991; 34 years ago
- Political alignment: Right wing, Liberal
- Language: Albanian
- Headquarters: Tirana, Albania
- Country: Albania
- Circulation: 7,833 (2002)
- Website: kohajone.com

Koha Jonë (English: Our Time) is a newspaper published in Albania. The paper is a politically unaffiliated daily newspaper based in Tirana.

== History ==
The paper was first published on 11 May 1991 by Nikolle Lesi and Aleksandër Frangaj in Lezhë and after some time the headquarters were moved to Tirana. Nikollë Lesi and Alexander Frangaj were the director and chief editor of the paper, respectively.

In 1996, Lesi became sole owner of the paper when he bought out Frangaj, who had owned 40 percent of the shares.

In 1997 the premises of Koha Jonë, at the time Albania's biggest-circulation daily, were completely burnt down by unknown perpetrators. No one was identified or prosecuted by the authorities in connection with those attacks.

== Circulation ==
Koha Jonë was the largest paper in Albania with a circulation of 34,000 copies in 1992. In 1995 the daily was the second most read newspaper in the country with a circulation of 30,000 copies. The circulation of the paper was 7,833 copies in 2002.

== Contents ==
The newspaper is organised in three sections, including the magazine.

1. News: Includes International, National, Tirana, Politics, Business, Technology, Science, Health, Sports, Education.
2. Opinion: Includes Editorials, Op-Eds and Letters to the Editor.
3. Features: Includes Arts, Movies, Theatre, and music.

Koha Jonë has had a web presence since 2008. Accessing articles requires no registration. The newspaper is available in PDF.

== See also ==
- List of newspapers in Albania
- News in Albania
