= List of programs broadcast by Top Channel =

This is a list of television programs broadcast by Albanian TV channel Top Channel. The channel was launched on December 20, 2001.

Top Channel's programmes include a broad range of mostly pre-recorded shows, news editions, social and economic programs and entertainments (movies, sports, etc.).

There are even two game shows named 100 Millionë and Tjetri! that were inspired from other game shows. Scheduled domestic and foreign programming includes:

== Nationally created TV shows broadcast by Top Channel ==
Original name	Format
Fiks Fare	Investigative satire (inspired by Striscia la notizia)
Exclusive	Inquiry program
Newsroom	Weekly news magazine
Info	Informational program
Shqip	Show about Albania
Top Story	Political talk show
Top Show	Talk Show
Top Show Magazine	Music/Talk Show
Pasdite në Top Channel	Afternoon Show
E Diell	Sunday Show
Wake Up	Morning Show
Select	Youth Magazine
Poker	Youth Magazine
Cabriolet	Gossip Magazine
Dosja Top Channel	Variety Show
POP Channel	News-Satirical Show
Procesi Sportiv	Sports Magazine
Top Fest	Albanian Modern Music Awards (2004-2015)
Summer Fest	Music Show
Open	Political talk show
Portokalli	Stand-up Variety Comedy
Big Brother Albania	Reality Show
Big Brother Fans Club	Talk Show
Komuna e Parisit	Sitcom
Gjurmë Shqiptare	Documentary
Top Select	Reality Show
MasterChef Albania	Talent Show
30 Minuta... Shef	Talent Show
The Voice of Albania	Talent Show
The Voice Kids	Talent Show
Të gjithë për një	Kids Show
100 Milionë	Game show inspired by The Million Pound Drop
Dua Vendin Tim	Quiz Show, in Albanian language
Kape Kohën	Game Show
Tjetri!	Game Show inspired by Avanti un altro!
Për Vete	Game Show
Në Shtëpinë Tonë	Game Show
Në 1 Javë	Game Show
Dua të të bëj të Lumtur	Reality Show
Ftesë në 5	Afternoon Show
Top Music Awards 2016	Award show
Hell's Kitchen Albania	Cookery Reality Show
Shiko Kush Luan	Game show
The Top List	Musik Show
Për'puthen	Dating Show
Për'puthen Prime	Dating Show
Shqipëria LIVE	Talk Show
ArtKand	Art Show
Pushime on Top	Summer Show
Big Brother VIP	Reality Show
Big Brother VIP – Fans' Club	Talk Show
Goca dhe Gra	Talk Show
Ëndërrtjerrësit	Talk Show about Top Channel's nostalgia
Balkan Project	Cook Show
Më thuaj një dëshirë	Reality Show
Top Arena	Sports Magazine
Qesh Mirë... Kush Qesh i Fundit	Reality/Game Show
Më lër të flas	Talk Show
A Live Night	Musik/Talk Show
Kepi i Tundimeve	Reality Show
Dancing with the Stars	Dance talent show
Shqipëria Tjetër	Documentary Show
StarTop	Reality Show
S’e Luan Topi	Talk Show
Inside Story	Documentary program
Gjurmë Shqiptare	Documentary program
Yjet Shqiptarë të Diasporës	Talent Show
Lufta e Nuseve	Reality Show

== International TV shows broadcast by Top Channel ==
Original name	Albanian translation	Origin
The Sopranos	Sopranot	United States
The Americans	Amerikanët	United States
Friends	Friends	United States
24	24 Orë	United States
CSI Miami	CSI Miami	United States
Lost	Të Humbur	United States
Desperate Housewives	Shtëpiake të Dëshpëruara	United States
Antimafia (TV series)	Smallville	United States
The West Wing	West Wing	United States
The Event	The Event	United States
Game of Thrones	Froni i Shpatave	United States
Breaking Bad	Breaking Bad	United States
Camelot	Kamelot	United States
The Kennedys	Kenedit	United States
The Borgias	Borxhiat	United States
Boardwalk Empire	Boardwalk Empire	United States
Homeland	Homeland	United States
Leverage	Rregullat e Lojes	United States
The Firm	Firma	United States
Nikita	Nikita	United States
Covert Affairs	Misione të Fshehta	United States
Transporter: The Series	Transportuesi	United States
Crossing Lines	Pa Kufij	United States
Smash	Smash	United States
Avatar: The Last Airbender	Avatar	United States
Gravity Falls	Graviteti Bie	United States
Monster by Mistake	Fantazmat	United States
SpongeBob SquarePants	SpongeBob SquarePants	United States
The Penguins of Madagascar	Pinguinet e Madagaskarit	United States
Peppa Pig	Derrkucja Pepa	United Kingdom
Engie Benjy	Enxhi Benxhi	United Kingdom
Footballers' Wives	Gratë e Futbollistëve	United Kingdom
Whitechapel	Whitechapel	United Kingdom
Luther	Luther	United Kingdom
Silk	Avokatët e Mbretërëshës	United Kingdom
Scott & Bailey	Scott & Bailey	United Kingdom
The State Within	Lojëra Pushteti	United Kingdom
Downton Abbey	Downton Abbey	United Kingdom
CentoVetrine	100 Zhabanuket	Italy
Aldo Moro - Il presidente	Aldo Moro	Italy
Un amore e una vendetta	Dashuri dhe Hakmarrje	Italy
Era mio fratello	Ishte Vëllai Im	Italy
Codice Aurora	Kodi Aurora	Italy
Ultimo	Heroi i fundit	Italy
Intelligence - Servizi & segreti	Inteligjente - Misione/Sekrete	Italy
La bambina dalle mani sporche	Me Duar të Papastra	Italy
Crimini	Krime	Italy
L'ultimo padrino	Kumbari i fundit	Italy
Squadra antimafia - Palermo oggi	Skuadra Antimafia - Palermo Sot	Italy
Sospetti	Të Dyshuar	Italy
Amanti e Segreti	Dashuri dhe Sekrete	Italy
Il peccato e la vergogna	Mekati dhe Turpi	Italy
L'onore e il rispetto	Nder dhe Respekt	Italy
Le Tre Rose di Eva	Tre Trëndafilat e Evës	Italy
Le Tre Rose di Eva 2	Tre Trëndafilat e Evës 2	Italy
Le Tre Rose di Eva 3	Tre Trëndafilat e Evës 3	Italy
Caterina e le sue figlie	Katerina dhe të Bijat	Italy
I cerchi nell'acqua	Si Rrathët e Ujit	Italy
Il sangue e la rosa	Gjak e Trëndafil	Italy
Attacco allo Stato	Shënjestër Politike	Italy
Escobar, el Patrón del Mal	Pablo Eskobar	Colombia
La viuda negra	Vejusha e Zezë	Colombia
Toda una dama	Një Zonjë e Vërtetë	Venezuela
El Rostro de Analía	Analia	United States
¿Dónde está Elisa?	Ku është Eliza	Chile
El Cuerpo del Deseo	Mundësia e dytë	United States
Mi Corasón Insiste en Lola Volcán	Zemra rreh vetëm për Lolën	United States
Una Maid en Manhattan	Dashuri në Manhatan	United States
Más sabe el diablo	Engjëll apo Djall	United States
Avenida Brasil	Bulevardi Brazil	Brazil
Salve Jorge	Guximi i një Gruaje	Brazil
El Señor de los Cielos	Lordi i Qiellit	United States
