= Dancing with the Stars (Albanian TV series) season 9 =

Dancing with the Stars
- Season 9
- Hosted by: Bora Zemani; Eno Popi
- Judges: Valbona Selimllari; Ilir Shaqiri; Lori Bala; Olta Gixhari
- Celebrity winner: Enxhi Nasufi
- Professional winner: Silvester Shuta
- No. of episodes: 13

Release
- Original network: Top Channel
- Original release: 6 October – 29 December 2023

Season chronology
- ← Previous; Season 8

The ninth season of Dancing with the Stars premiered on Top Channel on 6 October 2023. Bora Zemani and Eno Popi returned as hosts.

Valbona Selimllari was joined on the judging panel by Ilir Shaqiri, who had served as judge when the show aired on Vizion Plus, Lori Bala, who appeared as a professional partner in the previous seasons and season 2 contestant Olta Gixhari.

On 29 December 2023, Enxhi Nasufi & Silvester Shuta were announced as the winners of the season, with Sardi Strugaj & Ensa Llaci as the runners-up. Arnita Beqiraj & Eni Balla and Fifi & Graciano Tagani finished in third place.

For the first time, it was aired a spin-off show, with the name Dancing with the Stars – Fans' Club on Top Channel, Kiara Tito hosted the show and Albi Nako was the opinionist. The show premiered on 8 October 2023 and was aired every Sunday at 12:45 pm. The series features debates and conversations about the latest goings on the main show with a studio audience and celebrity panel, and with the first eliminated celebrity who are usually invited to the studio after leaving.

== Host and judges ==
Bora Zemani and Eno Popi both returned as hosts. Also, Valbona Selimllari returned as judge. On 1 January 2023, on the final of the eighth season, it was announced that Lori Bala would be in the next season a judge. On 8 September 2023, Ilir Shaqiri announced on the television show Wake Up, that he would be return as a judge. On 25 September 2023, Top Channel announced that Olta Gixhari will be a judge.

== Couples ==
On 14 September 2023, the first two celebrities announced as participants in the season were Enxhi Nasufi and Saimir Korreshi. Celebrity contestants continued to be revealed until 25 September 2022, when the full line-up was announced. This season featured fifteen celebrity contestants, the biggest number of participants so far.

Celebrity	Notability	Professional partner	Status
Sara Karaj	Social media influencer	Erind Sallahi	Eliminated 1st on 13 October 2023
Saimir Korreshi	Politician	Livia Lara	Eliminated 2nd on 20 October 2023
Armaldo Kllogjeri	Tenor	Marjana Shkreta	Eliminated 3rd on 27 October 2023
Roerd Toçe	Actor	Ensa Llaci	Withdrew on 3 November 2023
Ronaldo Sharka	TV Host & Journalist	Frenki Ziaj	Eliminated 4th on 3 November 2023
Elvis Pupa	Comedian & actor	Jora Hodo; Eltion Merja (week 7); Joana Janushi (week 7)	Eliminated 5th on 17 November 2023
Ina Kollçaku	Reality TV star & activist	Eltion Merja; Joana Janushi (week 7)	Eliminated 6th on 24 November 2023
Juliana Nura	Model & social media influencer	Dion Gjinika; Silvester Shuta (week 7)	Eliminated 7th on 1 December 2023
Atalanta Kërcyku	Miss World Albania 2019	Luixhino Hala; Graciano Tagani (week 7)	Eliminated 8th on 15 December 2023
Eni Shehu	TV presenter	Odeta Dishnica; Ensa Llaci (week 7)	Eliminated 9th & 10th on 22 December 2023
Irgen Çela	Comedian & actor	Jora Hodo; Joana Janushi (week 1–6)	Eliminated 9th & 10th on 22 December 2023
Arnita Beqiraj	Director	Eni Balla; Dion Gjinika (week 7)	Third place on 29 December 2023
Fifi	Singer & songwriter	Graciano Tagani; Luixhino Hala (week 7)	Third place on 29 December 2023
Sardi Strugaj	Singer	Ensa Llaci; Erisa Govaci (week 1–6); Odeta Dishnica (week 7)	Runners-up on 29 December 2023
Enxhi Nasufi	Singer, dancer & television presenter	Silvester Shuta; Eni Balla (week 7)	Winners on 29 December 2023

== Scoring chart ==
The highest score each week is indicated in bold green with a dagger (†), while the lowest score each week is indicated in italicized red with a double-dagger (‡).

Color key:

Winners
Runners-up
3rd place
Bottom two
Excused from competition for the week
Withdrew from competition
Immune
Eliminated

Dancing with the Stars (season 9) - Weekly scores
Couple	Pl.	Week													
Couple	Pl.	1	2	1+2	3	4	5	6 (Note: The couples were scored on a 50-point scale due to the presence of a guest judge.)	7	8	9	10	11	12	13
Enxhi & Silvester	1st	28	**30**†	**58**†	29	31	**35**†	44	38	32	36	40	33+40=73	35+40=**75**†	39+40=**79**†
Sardi & Erisa	2nd	20	27	47	30	28	**35**†	40	33	**39**†	34	30	35+33=68‡	36+38=74	37+40=77
Arnita & Eni	3rd	29	20	49	**36**†	30	**35**†	**47**†	30	35	34	36	38+37=**75**†	34+36=70	40+38=78
Fifi & Graciano	3rd	24	26	50	25	30	31+31=**62**†	44	34	30	36	33	40+32=72	(Note: This couple had immunity.)	38+37=75‡
Eni & Odeta	5th	27	27	54	29	28	31+31=**62**†	45	31 (Note: This couple was in the bottom two, but was not eliminated.)	29	**39**†	29‡	35+36=71	32+33=65‡ (Note: This couple was eliminated.)	
Irgen & Jora	5th	28	28	56	30	26	**35**†	39	**39**†	34	30	40+5=**45**†	40+30=70	36+36=72	
Atalanta & Luixhino	7th	**30**†	23	53	30	31	31+29=60	46	31	36	36	29‡	39+32=71		
Juliana & Dion	8th	27	27	54	21	33	31+30=61	43	36	34	26‡				
Ina & Eltion	9th	23	24	47	29	27	31+26=57	42	32	28‡					
Elvis & Jora	10th	22	25	47	25	30	**35**†	31‡	15‡						
Ronaldo & Frenki	11th	21	20	41‡	24	20‡	31+22=53‡								
Roerd & Ensa	12th	19‡	24	43	29	**36**†	**35**† (Note: This couple withdrew from the competition.)								
Armaldo & Marjana	13th	26	21	47	20‡	21									
Saimir & Livia	14th	22	(Note: This couple was excused from competition due to illness or injury, and was granted a bye to the following week.)		20‡										
Sara & Erind	15th	26	18‡	44											

=== Average chart ===
This table only counts for dances scored on a traditional 40-points scale. Scores from guest judges are not included.

Couple	Rank by average	Total points	Number of dances	Total average
Enxhi & Silvester	1	560	16	35.0
Arnita & Eni	2	545	16	34.1
Sardi & Erisa	3	526	16	32.9
Irgen & Jora	4	422	13	32.5
Fifi & Graciano	5	481	15	32.1
Atalanta & Luixhino	6	413	13	31.8
Eni & Odeta	7	473	15	31.5
Juliana & Dion	8	297	10	29.7
Roerd & Ensa	9	143	5	28.6
Ina & Eltion	10	252	9	28.0
Elvis & Jora	11	174	7	24.9
Ronaldo & Frenki	12	138	6	23.0
Armaldo & Marjana	13	88	4	22.0
Sara & Erind	13	44	2	22.0
Saimir & Livia	15	42	2	21.0

== Highest and lowest scoring performances of the series ==
The best and worst performances in each dance according to the judges' 40-point scale are as follows. Scores from guest judges are not included.

Dance	Celebrity	Highest score	Celebrity	Lowest score
American Smooth	Arnita Beqiraj	37	Irgen Çela	28
Cha-Cha-Cha	Enxhi Nasufi	40	Elvis Pupa	22
Charleston	Enxhi Nasufi; Arnita Beqiraj	36	Ronaldo Sharka	20
Contemporary	Irgen Çela	40	Elvis Pupa	15
Foxtrot	Enxhi Nasufi	40	Armaldo Kllogjeri; Ina Kollçaku	26
Freestyle	Fifi; Enxhi Nasufi; Sardi Strugaj	40	Enxhi Nasufi	33
Jive	Irgen Çela; Atalanta Kërcyku	36	Arnita Beqiraj	20
Paso Doble	Irgen Çela	39	Sara Karaj	18
Quickstep	Eni Shehu	36	Armaldo Kllogjeri	21
Rock and Roll	Armaldo Kllogjeri	20		
Rumba	Enxhi Nasufi	40	Roerd Toçe	19
Salsa	Sardi Strugaj	39	Ronaldo Sharka	20
Samba	Enxhi Nasufi	39	Sardi Strugaj; Saimir Korreshi	20
Swing	Eni Shehu	29		
Tango	Arnita Beqiraj	40	Ina Kollçaku	24
Viennese Waltz	Enxhi Nasufi	35	Roerd Toçe	24
Waltz	Sardi Strugaj	38	Ronaldo Sharka	22

== Couples' highest and lowest scoring dances ==
Scores are based upon a potential 40-point maximum. Scores from guest judges are not included.

Couples	Highest scoring dance	Lowest scoring dance
Enxhi & Silvester	Foxtrot; Cha-Cha-Cha; Rumba; Freestyle (40)	Contemporary (28)
Sardi & Erisa	Freestyle (40)	Samba (20)
Arnita & Eni	Tango (40)	Jive (20)
Fifi & Graciano	Freestyle (40)	Cha-Cha-Cha (24)
Eni & Odeta	Contemporary (39)	Tango; Salsa (27)
Irgen & Jora	Contemporary (40)	Cha-Cha-Cha (26)
Atalanta & Luixhino	Freestyle (39)	Cha-Cha-Cha (23)
Juliana & Dion	Waltz (36)	Salsa (21)
Ina & Eltion	Cha-Cha-Cha (32)	Jive (23)
Elvis & Jora	Paso Doble (30)	Contemporary (15)
Ronaldo & Frenki	Rumba (24)	Charleston; Salsa (20)
Roerd & Ensa	Contemporary (36)	Rumba (19)
Armaldo & Marjana	Foxtrot (26)	Rock and Roll (20)
Saimir & Livia	Quickstep (22)	Samba (20)
Sara & Erind	Viennese Waltz (26)	Paso Doble (18)

== Weekly scores and songs ==
Unless indicated otherwise, individual judges scores in the charts below (given in parentheses) are listed in this order from left to right: Valbona Selimllari, Lori Bala, Ilir Shaqiri, Olta Gixhari.

=== Week 1: First Dances ===
Musical guest: Luiz Ejlli—"Pa ty"

There was no elimination this week; all scores carried over to the following week. Couples are listed in the order they performed.

Couple	Score	Dance	Music
Eni & Odeta	27 (8, 7, 5, 7)	Tango	"Higher" — Michael Bublé
Sardi & Erisa	20 (6, 5, 4, 5)	Samba	"Livin' la Vida Loca" — Ricky Martin
Enxhi & Silvester	28 (7, 7, 7, 7)	Contemporary	"Sweet Disposition" — The Temper Trap
Saimir & Livia	22 (6, 6, 4, 6)	Quickstep	"Bicikleta" — Francesk Radi
Roerd & Ensa	19 (5, 4, 4, 6)	Rumba	"I Feel Like I'm Drowning" — Two Feet
Ina & Eltion	23 (6, 6, 5, 6)	Jive	"Dance with Me Tonight" — Olly Murs
Armaldo & Marjana	26 (7, 6, 6, 7)	Foxtrot	"Can't Help Falling in Love" — Elvis Presley
Juliana & Dion	27 (7, 7, 6, 7)	Paso Doble	"Maska e madheshtise" — Genti
Fifi & Graciano	24 (7, 6, 5, 6)	Cha-Cha-Cha	"Savage" — Megan Thee Stallion
Irgen & Joana	28 (7, 7, 6, 8)	Charleston	"Honey, I'm Good" — Andy Grammer
Ronaldo & Frenki	21 (5, 6, 4, 6)	Samba	"Ja ku jam" — Ardit Gjebrea
Arnita & Eni	29 (7, 8, 7, 7)	Waltz	"Glimpse of Us" — Joji
Sara & Erind	26 (7, 8, 6, 5)	Viennese Waltz	"Una canzone triste" — Marco Mengoni
Atalanta & Luixhino	30 (8, 7, 7, 8)	Tango	"Hape Veten Ti" — Aurela Gaçe
Elvis & Jora	22 (7, 4, 5, 6)	Salsa	"La Gozadera" — Gente de Zona ft. Marc Anthony

=== Week 2: First Elimination ===
After Saimir Korreshi sustained a back injury, he was unable to perform on the live show. Under the rules of the show, he was granted a bye to the following week.

Couples are listed in the order they performed.

Couple	Score	Dance	Music	Result
Juliana & Dion	27 (7, 8, 5, 7)	Quickstep	"Pencil Full of Lead" — Paolo Nutini	Safe
Elvis & Jora	25 (7, 6, 5, 7)	Viennese Waltz	"Kur t’kujtohet" — Yll Limani	Safe
Sara & Erind	18 (6, 4, 3, 5)	Paso Doble	"Believer" — Imagine Dragons	Eliminated
Ronaldo & Frenki	20 (6, 5, 4, 5)	Charleston	"That Man" — Caro Emerald	Bottom two
Atalanta & Luixhino	23 (7, 6, 4, 6)	Cha-Cha-Cha	"Just Got Paid" — Sigala, Ella Eyre & Meghan Trainor ft. French Montana	Safe
Fifi & Graciano	26 (7, 6, 6, 7)	Waltz	"Marova" — Fifi	Safe
Arnita & Eni	20 (6, 5, 4, 5)	Jive	"Mammamia" — Måneskin	Safe
Roerd & Ensa	24 (7, 6, 4, 7)	Viennese Waltz	"How Were We to Know" — Emeli Sandé	Safe
Sardi & Erisa	27 (8, 5, 6, 8)	Contemporary	"I Won't Complain" — Benjamin Clementine	Safe
Ina & Eltion	24 (6, 6, 5, 7)	Tango	"Tore My Heart" — OONA	Safe
Enxhi & Silvester	30 (8, 7, 7, 8)	Samba	"3 to Tango" — Pitbull	Safe
Eni & Odeta	27 (7, 7, 5, 8)	Salsa	"El Anillo" — Jennifer Lopez	Safe
Irgen & Joana	28 (8, 8, 5, 7)	American Smooth	"This Will Be" — Natalie Cole	Safe
Armaldo & Marjana	21 (7, 4, 3, 7)	Paso Doble	"Smooth Criminal" — Michael Jackson	Safe

=== Week 3: DigitAlb Movie Night ===
Couples are listed in the order they performed.

Couple	Score	Dance	Music	DigitAlb film	Result
Fifi & Graciano	25 (7, 6, 6, 6)	Jive	"One Way or Another"	Cruella	Safe
Irgen & Joana	30 (8, 8, 7, 7)	Quickstep	"Friend Like Me"	Aladdin	Safe
Sardi & Erisa	30 (8, 8, 7, 7)	Paso Doble	"Dead Reckoning Opening Titles"	Mission: Impossible – Dead Reckoning Part One	Safe
Armaldo & Marjana	20 (6, 4, 5, 5)	Rock and Roll	"Jailhouse Rock"	The Blues Brothers	Bottom two
Enxhi & Silvester	29 (8, 7, 7, 7)	Waltz	"Gaston"	Beauty and the Beast	Safe
Ronaldo & Frenki	24 (7, 7, 6, 4)	Rumba	"Cuando Seas Mia"	Cuando seas mía	Safe
Eni & Odeta	29 (8, 6, 7, 8)	Swing	"You're the One That I Want"	Grease	Safe
Roerd & Ensa	29 (8, 7, 6, 8)	Paso Doble	"He's a Pirate"	Pirates of the Caribbean: The Curse of the Black Pearl	Safe
Juliana & Dion	21 (6, 5, 4, 6)	Salsa	"(I've Had) The Time of My Life"	Dirty Dancing	Safe
Ina & Eltion	29 (7, 8, 6, 8)	Contemporary	"What Was I Made For?"	Barbie	Safe
Saimir & Livia	20 (6, 4, 4, 6)	Samba	"I Just Can't Wait to Be King"	The Lion King	Eliminated
Atalanta & Luixhino	30 (8, 8, 7, 7)	Charleston	"A Little Party Never Killed Nobody (All We Got)"	The Great Gatsby	Safe
Elvis & Jora	25 (7, 5, 7, 6)	Jive	"Scarface (Push It to the Limit)"	Scarface	Safe
Arnita & Eni	36 (9, 9, 9, 9)	Tango	"El Tango de Roxanne"	Moulin Rouge!	Safe

=== Week 4 ===
Couples are listed in the order they performed.

Couple	Score	Dance	Music	Result
Enxhi & Silvester	31 (8, 8, 7, 8)	Jive	"As It Was" — Harry Styles	Safe
Arnita & Eni	30 (8, 8, 7, 7)	Contemporary	"Lose Control" — Teddy Swims	Safe
Juliana & Dion	33 (9, 8, 7, 9)	Foxtrot	"A Whole New World" — Zayn Malik & Zhavia Ward	Safe
Sardi & Erisa	28 (8, 7, 5, 8)	Cha-Cha-Cha	"Makeba" — Jain	Safe
Ina & Eltion	27 (8, 6, 6, 7)	Paso Doble	"A Palé" — Rosalía	Safe
Fifi & Graciano	30 (8, 8, 6, 8)	Charleston	"Bang Bang" — will.i.am	Safe
Eni & Odeta	28 (8, 7, 5, 8)	Waltz	"Sono già solo" — Modà	Safe
Ronaldo & Frenki	20 (6, 5, 4, 5)	Salsa	"La Onda" — Mike Diamondz	Bottom two
Armaldo & Marjana	21 (7, 5, 3, 6)	Quickstep	"O Jete" — Armaldo Kllogjeri	Eliminated
Atalanta & Luixhino	31 (8, 7, 7, 9)	Rumba	"No Time to Die" — Billie Eilish	Safe
Elvis & Jora	30 (8, 7, 7, 8)	Paso Doble	"Asturias" — Mathias Duplessy & The 3 Violins of the World	Safe
Irgen & Joana	26 (8, 6, 5, 7)	Cha-Cha-Cha	"Don't Stop the Music" — Rihanna	Safe
Roerd & Ensa	36 (9, 9, 8, 10)	Contemporary	"Take Me to Church" — Hozier	Safe

=== Week 5: '80s-'90s Night ===
This week, the show was in two parts. In the first part the couples danced in teams, and the winner team had immunity for the second part and the loser team had to dance again in one unlearned dance in the second part. Couples are listed in the order they performed.

Roerd Toçe announced that he had to withdraw from the competition for medical reasons, although he and Ensa Llaci still performed on the first part.

Couple	Score	Dance	Music	Result
Arnita & Eni Elvis & Jora Enxhi & Silvester Irgen & Joana Roerd & Ensa Sardi & Erisa	35 (10, 8, 8, 9)	Freestyle	"Te Pres" — Elita 5 "Cdo njeri" — Spirit Voice "Enderroj" — Altin Goci "Kalle Kalle" — Armend Rexhepagiqi	Winner (Won Immunity)
Atalanta & Luixhino Eni & Odeta Fifi & Graciano Ina & Eltion Juliana & Dion Ronaldo & Frenki	31 (9, 9, 6, 7)	Freestyle	"Te Pres" — Elita 5 "Cdo njeri" — Spirit Voice "Enderroj" — Altin Goci "Kalle Kalle" — Armend Rexhepagiqi	Loser
Fifi & Graciano	31 (8, 8, 7, 8)	Samba	"Domino Dancing" — Pet Shop Boys	Safe
Atalanta & Luixhino	29 (8, 7, 6, 8)	Quickstep	"Xixellonja" — Gili	Safe
Ina & Eltion	26 (8, 6, 5, 7)	Foxtrot	"Greatest Love of All" — Whitney Houston	Bottom two
Eni & Odeta	31 (8, 8, 6, 9)	Jive	"Makina e memories" — Ardit Gjebrea	Safe
Ronaldo & Frenki	22 (7, 6, 5, 4)	Waltz	"I Don't Want to Miss a Thing" — Aerosmith	Eliminated
Juliana & Dion	30 (8, 8, 7, 7)	Cha-Cha-Cha	"Spice Up Your Life" — Spice Girls	Safe

Dance-Off

Couples are listed in the order they performed.

Couple	Dance	Music	Result
Ina & Eltion	Freestyle	"Sex Bomb" — Tom Jones & Mousse T.	Safe
Ronaldo & Frenki	Freestyle	"Sex Bomb" — Tom Jones & Mousse T.	Eliminated

Judges' votes to save

- Valbona: Ina & Eltion
- Lori: Ronaldo & Frenki
- Ilir: Ina & Eltion (Since the other judges were not unanimous, Ilir, as head judge, made the final decision to save Ina & Eltion.)
- Olta: Ina & Eltion

=== Week 6: Alban Skënderaj Night ===
Individual judges' scores are given in this order from left to right: Valbona Selimllari, Lori Bala, Alban Skënderaj, Ilir Shaqiri, Olta Gixhari.

Each couple performed one unlearned dance to a song by Alban Skënderaj, who was also a guest judge. Couples are listed in the order they performed.

Alban Skënderaj performed "Ja ku Jam" and "Sikur ta dija".

Couple	Score	Dance	Alban Skënderaj Music
Sardi & Erisa	40 (9, 8, 9, 6, 8)	Rumba	"Njëhere në jetë"
Elvis & Jora	31 (7, 4, 9, 5, 6)	Cha-Cha-Cha	"'93"
Ina & Eltion	42 (8, 8, 10, 7, 9)	Salsa	"Ping Pong"
Enxhi & Silvester	44 (9, 8, 10, 8, 9)	Argentine tango	"Stoli i trëndafilave"
Arnita & Eni	47 (10, 9, 10, 9, 9)	Foxtrot	"Ende ka shpresë"
Juliana & Dion	43 (9, 8, 10, 8, 8)	Contemporary	"Jetë"
Irgen & Joana	39 (9, 7, 9, 6, 8)	Waltz	"Eklips"
Eni & Odeta	45 (10, 9, 9, 8, 9)	Quickstep	"Kam nëvoje"
Fifi & Graciano	44 (9, 9, 10, 7, 9)	Tango	"Mbretër pa kurorë"
Atalanta & Luixhino	46 (9, 9, 10, 9, 9)	Jive	"Një ëndërr"

=== Week 7: Switch-Up Night ===
The celebrities performed one unlearned dance with a different partner selected by Ilir Shaqiri. Couples are listed in the order they performed.

Couple	Score	Dance	Music	Result
Sardi & Odeta	33 (10, 8, 7, 8)	American Smooth	"Until I Found You" — Stephen Sanchez	Safe
Arnita & Dion	30 (8, 7, 7, 8)	Cha-Cha-Cha	"Adiós" — Ricky Martin	Safe
Enxhi & Eni	38 (10, 10, 9, 9)	Freestyle	"Run This Town" — Jay-Z ft. Rihanna & Kanye West	Safe
Juliana & Silvester	36 (9, 9, 9, 9)	Waltz	"All This Love" — Emeli Sandé	Safe
Elvis & Eltion	15 (5, 4, 4, 2)	Contemporary	"Recovery" — James Arthur	Eliminated
Fifi & Luixhino	34 (9, 8, 8, 9)	Rumba	"Stand by Me" — Watazu	Safe
Atalanta & Graciano	31 (9, 7, 7, 8)	Samba	"Gasolina" — Daddy Yankee	Safe
Eni & Erisa	31 (9, 8, 7, 7)	Charleston	"Another Day of Sun" — cast of La La Land	Bottom two
Irgen & Jora	39 (10, 10, 9, 10)	Paso Doble	"Ameksa (District 78 Remix)" — Taalbi Brothers	Safe
Ina & Joana	32 (8, 8, 8, 8)	Cha-Cha-Cha	"Papi" — Jennifer Lopez	Safe

Dance-Off

Couples are listed in the order they performed.

Couple	Dance	Music	Result
Elvis & Joana	Freestyle	"Tattoo" — Loreen	Eliminated
Eni & Odeta	Freestyle	"Tattoo" — Loreen	Safe

Judges' votes to save

- Valbona: Eni & Odeta
- Lori: Eni & Odeta
- Ilir: Did not vote, but would have voted to save Eni & Odeta
- Olta: Eni & Odeta

=== Week 8: Albanian Musik ===
In the seventh week, the judges had the power to change one couple. They choose Irgen Çela to dance with Jora Hodo. Due to an injury, Erisa Govaci was unable to perform, so Sardi Strugaj performed with Ensa Llaci instead.

Couples are listed in the order they performed.

Couple	Score	Dance	Music	Result
Fifi & Graciano	30 (8, 8, 7, 7)	American Smooth	"Ra Faja" — Eda Zari	Safe
Enxhi & Silvester	32 (9, 8, 7, 8)	Quickstep	"Humba Pranveren" — Françesk Radi	Safe
Eni & Odeta	29 (9, 7, 6, 7)	Rumba	"Era" — Mira Konçi & Faton Macula	Bottom two
Ina & Eltion	28 (8, 7, 6, 7)	Waltz	"Rrjedhe ne kenge e ligjerime" — Rame Lahaj	Eliminated
Sardi & Ensa	39 (10, 10, 9, 10)	Salsa	"Kur bjen fyelli e çiftelia" — Irma Libohova	Safe
Irgen & Jora	34 (9, 8, 8, 9)	Tango	"Tomlin e nones" — Jericho	Safe
Arnita & Eni	35 (9, 9, 8, 9)	Quickstep	"Dashuria e Pare" — Anita Bitri	Safe
Juliana & Dion	34 (9, 9, 8, 8)	American Smooth	"Me the te dua" — Parashqevi Simaku	Safe
Atalanta & Luixhino	36 (10, 10, 8, 8)	Paso Doble	"Xhamadani Vija Vija" — Sidrit Bejleri	Safe

Dance-Off

Couples are listed in the order they performed.

Couple	Dance	Music	Result
Eni & Odeta	Freestyle	"Djaloshi dhe Shiu" — Sidrit Bejleri	Safe
Ina & Eltion	Freestyle	"Djaloshi dhe Shiu" — Sidrit Bejleri	Eliminated

Judges' votes to save

- Valbona: Eni & Odeta
- Lori: Eni & Odeta
- Ilir: Did not vote, but would have voted to save Eni & Odeta
- Olta: Eni & Odeta

=== Week 9: Trio Night ===
Each couple performed a trio dance involving a professional partner. Couples are listed in the order they performed.

Couple	Trio dance partner	Score	Dance	Music	Result
Juliana & Dion	Erind Sallahi	26 (7, 6, 6, 7)	Jive	"Girlfriend" — Avril Lavigne	Eliminated
Atalanta & Luixhino	Eltion Merja	36 (9, 8, 9, 10)	Contemporary	"Savage Daughter" — Ekaterina Shelehova	Safe
Irgen & Jora	Frenki Ziaj	30 (8, 7, 8, 7)	Salsa	"Mambo No. 5 (A Little Bit Of...)" — Lou Bega	Bottom two
Sardi & Ensa	Frenki Ziaj	34 (10, 8, 8, 8)	Foxtrot	"A ja thash" — Sardi Strugaj	Safe
Eni & Odeta	Livia Lara	39 (10, 10, 9, 10)	Contemporary	"Somebody That I Used to Know" — Gotye ft. Kimbra	Safe
Fifi & Graciano	Erind Sallahi	36 (9, 9, 9, 9)	Paso Doble	"Unstoppable" — E.S. Posthumus	Safe
Arnita & Eni	Erind Sallahi	34 (9, 8, 8, 9)	Samba	"Whenever, Wherever" — Shakira	Safe
Enxhi & Silvester	Eltion Merja	36 (9, 9, 9, 9)	Charleston	"Rock It for Me" — Caravan Palace	Safe

Dance-Off

Couples are listed in the order they performed.

Couple	Dance	Music	Result
Irgen & Jora	Cha-Cha-Cha	"Million Dollar Bill" — Whitney Houston	Safe
Juliana & Dion	Cha-Cha-Cha	"Million Dollar Bill" — Whitney Houston	Eliminated

Judges' votes to save

- Valbona: Irgen & Jora
- Lori: Juliana & Dion
- Ilir: Irgen & Jora (Since the other judges were not unanimous, Ilir, as head judge, made the final decision to save Irgen & Jora.)
- Olta: Irgen & Jora

=== Week 10 ===
There was no elimination this week. Each couple performed in a dance marathon, with the winner receiving 5 bonus points, and a one unlearned dance. For receiving the highest score at the end of the show, Irgen & Jora received immunity from a one unlearned dance to be held the following week, and would also receive bonus points next week. Couples are listed in the order they performed.

Couple	Score	Dance	Music
Sardi & Ensa	0	Dance marathon	"Boogie Wonderland" — Earth, Wind & Fire with The Emotions
Eni & Odeta	0	Dance marathon	"Boogie Wonderland" — Earth, Wind & Fire with The Emotions
Fifi & Graciano	0	Dance marathon	"Boogie Wonderland" — Earth, Wind & Fire with The Emotions
Arnita & Eni	0	Dance marathon	"Boogie Wonderland" — Earth, Wind & Fire with The Emotions
Enxhi & Silvester	0	Dance marathon	"Boogie Wonderland" — Earth, Wind & Fire with The Emotions
Atalanta & Luixhino	0	Dance marathon	"Boogie Wonderland" — Earth, Wind & Fire with The Emotions
Irgen & Jora	5	Dance marathon	"Boogie Wonderland" — Earth, Wind & Fire with The Emotions
Sardi & Ensa	30 (8, 7, 7, 8)	Jive	"I'll Be There for You" — The Rembrandts
Enxhi & Silvester	40 (10, 10, 10, 10)	Foxtrot	"Say Something" — A Great Big World & Christina Aguilera
Arnita & Eni	36 (9, 9, 9, 9)	Rumba	"Shape of My Heart" — Sting
Atalanta & Luixhino	29 (8, 7, 7, 7)	Waltz	"Je suis malade" — Dalida
Irgen & Jora	40 (10, 10, 10, 10)	Contemporary	"This is War" — Matthew Raetzel ft. Richard Farrell
Fifi & Graciano	33 (9, 8, 8, 8)	Contemporary	"I Was Here" — Beyoncé
Eni & Odeta	29 (8, 6, 7, 8)	Cha-Cha-Cha	"(It Goes Like) Nanana" — Peggy Gou

=== Week 11: Quarter-Final ===
Each couple performed one unlearned dance and a trio dance involving a celebrity person. Irgen & Jora were exempt from the first round, and they automatically received 40 bonus points for having finished first at the end of the previous week. For receiving the highest score at the end of the show, Fifi & Graciano received immunity for the next week and were the first finalists of the season. Couples are listed in the order they performed.

Couple	Trio dance partner	Score	Dance	Music	Result
Sardi & Ensa	Semi Jaupaj	35 (9, 9, 8, 9)	Freestyle	"Synin" — Elvana Gjata	Safe
Sardi & Ensa		33 (9, 8, 8, 8)	Quickstep	"I'm So Excited" — Ballroom Orchestra	Safe
Enxhi & Silvester	Kristina Baki	33 (9, 9, 7, 8)	Freestyle	"Yjet dalin natën" — Capital T, Ledri Vula & Majk	Safe
Enxhi & Silvester		40 (10, 10, 10, 10)	Cha-Cha-Cha	"She Bangs" — Ricky Martin	Safe
Eni & Odeta	Adelina Tahiri	35 (9, 9, 8, 9)	Freestyle	"One Night in Barcelona" — Kejsi Tola	Safe
Eni & Odeta		36 (9, 9, 9, 9)	Paso Doble	"Flamenco" — Timmy Trumpet & JETFIRE ft. Rage	Safe
Arnita & Eni	Arbër Çepani	38 (10, 9, 9, 10)	Freestyle	"Te Dua" — Anxhela Peristeri & G-Bani	Safe
Arnita & Eni		37 (10, 9, 9, 9)	American Smooth	"Valentine" — Måneskin	Safe
Atalanta & Luixhino	Salsano Rrapi	39 (10, 10, 9, 10)	Freestyle	"U Kry" — Yll Limani	Eliminated
Atalanta & Luixhino		32 (9, 7, 8, 8)	Salsa	"Come Check This" — Fetish	Eliminated
Fifi & Graciano	Romeo Veshaj	40 (10, 10, 10, 10)	Freestyle	"Nale" — Fifi	Safe
Fifi & Graciano		32 (8, 8, 8, 8)	Salsa	"Cuba 2012 (DJ Rebel Street - Dance 2 Remix)" — Latin Formation	Safe
Irgen & Jora		30 (8, 7, 7, 8)	Rumba	"You Can Leave Your Hat On" — Joe Cocker	Bottom two

=== Week 12: Semifinal ===
Each couple performed two unlearned dances. Fifi & Graciano had immunity for having finished first at the end of the previous week. Couples are listed in the order they performed.

Couple	Score	Dance	Music	Result
Irgen & Jora	36 (9, 9, 9, 9)	Jive	"Shake It Off" — Taylor Swift	Eliminated
Irgen & Jora	36 (10, 8, 9, 9)	Foxtrot	"Make Someone Happy" — Jimmy Durante	Eliminated
Sardi & Ensa	36 (10, 9, 8, 9)	Tango	"Strange Love" — Koop	Safe
Sardi & Ensa	38 (10, 9, 9, 10)	Waltz	"Please Come Home for Christmas" — Kelly Clarkson	Safe
Eni & Odeta	32 (9, 8, 7, 8)	Samba	"Love on Layaway" — Gloria Estefan	Eliminated
Eni & Odeta	33 (9, 8, 8, 8)	American Smooth	"Taste the Feeling" — Avicii & Conrad Sewell	Eliminated
Enxhi & Silvester	35 (9, 8, 9, 9)	Viennese Waltz	"Snowman" — Sia	Safe
Enxhi & Silvester	40 (10, 10, 10, 10)	Rumba	"I Just Want to Make Love to You" — Etta James	Safe
Arnita & Eni	34 (9, 8, 8, 9)	Paso Doble	"Sleigh Ride" — District 78	Safe
Arnita & Eni	36 (9, 9, 9, 9)	Charleston	"Santa Claus Is Comin' to Town" — Bing Crosby	Safe

=== Week 13: Final ===
During the first part of the final, each couple performed two routines, one of which was their favorite dance of the season and the other a Freestyle. Then, the couple with the lowest public vote was eliminated. During the second part of the show, each couple performed their showdance routine. Also, in the second part the judges, they did not give their opinion and vote.

Part 1

Couples are listed in the order they performed.

Couple	Score	Dance	Music	Result
Arnita & Eni	40 (10, 10, 10, 10)	Tango	"El Tango de Roxanne" — José Feliciano, Ewan McGregor & Jacek Koman	Third place
Arnita & Eni	38 (10, 9, 9, 10)	Freestyle	"Easy on Me" — Adele/"Holding Out for a Hero" — Bonnie Tyler	Third place
Fifi & Graciano	38 (10, 9, 9, 10)	Paso Doble	"Unstoppable" — E.S. Posthumus	Third place
Fifi & Graciano	37 (10, 9, 9, 9)	Freestyle	"Stand Up" — Cynthia Erivo/"Run the World (Girls)" — Beyoncé	Third place
Sardi & Ensa	37 (10, 9, 9, 9)	Salsa	"Kur bjen fyelli e çiftelia" — Irma Libohova	Safe
Sardi & Ensa	40 (10, 10, 10, 10)	Freestyle	"Burn" — Tom Walker	Safe
Enxhi & Silvester	39 (10, 10, 9, 10)	Samba	"3 to Tango" — Pitbull	Safe
Enxhi & Silvester	40 (10, 10, 10, 10)	Freestyle	"One Night Only" — Deena Jones & the Dreams	Safe

Part 2

Couples are listed in the order they performed.

Couple	Dance	Music	Result
Enxhi & Silvester	Showdance	"O Fortuna (Epic Trailer Version)" — Hidden Citizens	Winners
Sardi & Ensa	Showdance	"O Fortuna (Epic Trailer Version)" — Hidden Citizens	Runners-Up

== Dance chart ==
The couples performed the following each week:

- Week 1-4: One unlearned dance
- Week 5: One unlearned dance & team dance
- Week 6-8: One unlearned dance
- Week 9: One unlearned trio dance
- Week 10: Dance marathon & One unlearned dance
- Week 11: One unlearned trio dance & One unlearned dance
- Week 12: Two unlearned dances
- Week 13: Couple's favorite dance of the season, Freestyle and Showdance

Dancing with the Stars (season 9) - Dance chart
Couple	Week																		
Couple	1	2	3	4	5		6	7	8	9	10		11		12		13		
Enxhi & Silvester	Contemp.	Samba	Waltz	Jive	Team Freestyle	Immunity	Argentine tango	Freestyle	Quickstep	Charleston	Dance marathon	Foxtrot	Freestyle	Cha-Cha-Cha	Viennese Waltz	Rumba	Samba	Freestyle	Showdance
Sardi & Erisa	Samba	Contemp.	Paso Doble	Cha-Cha-Cha	Team Freestyle	Immunity	Rumba	American Smooth	Salsa	Foxtrot	Dance marathon	Jive	Freestyle	Quickstep	Tango	Waltz	Salsa	Freestyle	Showdance
Arnita & Eni	Waltz	Jive	Tango	Contemp.	Team Freestyle	Immunity	Foxtrot	Cha-Cha-Cha	Quickstep	Samba	Dance marathon	Rumba	Freestyle	American Smooth	Paso Doble	Charleston	Tango	Freestyle	
Fifi & Graciano	Cha-Cha-Cha	Waltz	Jive	Charleston	Team Freestyle	Samba	Tango	Rumba	American Smooth	Paso Doble	Dance marathon	Contemp.	Freestyle	Salsa	Immunity		Paso Doble	Freestyle	
Eni & Odeta	Tango	Salsa	Swing	Waltz	Team Freestyle	Jive	Quickstep	Charleston	Rumba	Contemp.	Dance marathon	Cha-Cha-Cha	Freestyle	Paso Doble	Samba	American Smooth			
Irgen & Jora	Charleston	American Smooth	Quickstep	Cha-Cha-Cha	Team Freestyle	Immunity	Waltz	Paso Doble	Tango	Salsa	Dance marathon	Contemp.	Immunity	Rumba	Jive	Foxtrot			
Atalanta & Luixhino	Tango	Cha-Cha-Cha	Charleston	Rumba	Team Freestyle	Quickstep	Jive	Samba	Paso Doble	Contemp.	Dance marathon	Waltz	Freestyle	Salsa					
Juliana & Dion	Paso Doble	Quickstep	Salsa	Foxtrot	Team Freestyle	Cha-Cha-Cha	Contemp.	Waltz	American Smooth	Jive									
Ina & Eltion	Jive	Tango	Contemp.	Paso Doble	Team Freestyle	Foxtrot	Salsa	Cha-Cha-Cha	Waltz										
Elvis & Jora	Salsa	Viennese Waltz	Jive	Paso Doble	Team Freestyle	Immunity	Cha-Cha-Cha	Contemp.											
Ronaldo & Frenki	Samba	Charleston	Rumba	Salsa	Team Freestyle	Waltz													
Roerd & Ensa	Rumba	Viennese Waltz	Paso Doble	Contemp.	Team Freestyle														
Armaldo & Marjana	Foxtrot	Paso Doble	Rock and Roll	Quickstep															
Saimir & Livia	Quickstep		Samba																
Sara & Erind	Viennese Waltz	Paso Doble																	
