= Ceno (surname) =

Ceno is a surname.

- Egla Ceno (born 1977), Albanian actress and television presenter
- Elton Çeno (born 1976),Albanian retired football player

== See also ==
- Ceno
- Ceno Kryeziu (1895 – 1927), Albanian political figure of the 1910s, 1920s
