= Prenga =

Prenga is a surname. Notable people with this surname include:

- Besnik Prenga (born 1969), Albanian football player
- Herdi Prenga (born 1994), Albanian-Croatian football player
- Kristian Prenga (born 1991), Albanian heavyweight boxer
- Ledjana Prenga (born 1997), Albanian reality television contestant
- Armando Prenga, member of the Socialist Party of Albania
