= Eno Popi =

Albanian television presenter (born 1981)

- Born: 19 June 1981 (age 45); Tirana, PSR Albania
- Education: University of Tirana; University of Urbino Carlo Bo
- Occupations: Presenter; journalist; radio personality; lecturer
- Years active: 1997–present
- Children: 1

Eno Popi (born 19 June 1981) is an Albanian lecturer and former television presenter. He was known for presenting several entertainment and reality shows on Top Channel, including Wake Up, StarTop, and Dancing with the Stars.

== Early life and education ==
Popi was born in Tirana, on 19 June 1981. He studied journalism at the Faculty of History and Philology at the University of Tirana, graduating in 2005. In 2007, he earned a master's degree in Multimedia Editing from the University of Carlo Bo in Urbino, Italy.

== Career ==
Popi began his career as a culture reporter in 1997 for the newspaper Koha TV.

In September 1999 he joined Top Albania Radio as a news editor in the newsroom and later became presenter of several daily programs. In 2006, he hosted Radio Magazine, and in 2007, together with Ledion Liço, created the talk-show Live from Tirana. This format became the basis of the daily morning program Wake Up, which launched two years later and was broadcast simultaneously on Top Channel and Top Albania Radio.

Alongside his media career, Popi has also served as a lecturer at the Department of Journalism of the Faculty of History and Philology, University of Tirana.

=== Television ===
Some of the television programs Popi has presented or co-hosted on Top Channel include:

- Top Select – early music program, co-hosted with Arbana Osmani
- Wake Up – daily morning program
- Big Brother Albania – co-host and later host
- Big Brother Albania Fans Club (seasons 1–3)
- Të gjithë për një
- 100 Milionë
- Dilema (Albanian version of Deal or No Deal)
- StarTop
- Dancing with the Stars Albania (seasons 8–9), co-hosted with Bora Zemani
