= 2002 FIVB World Championship =

2002 FIVB World Championship may refer to:

- 2002 FIVB Men's World Championship
- 2002 FIVB Women's World Championship
