= 5 Times No =

2023 Albanian romantic comedy film

- Poster of 5 Times No
- 5 herë jo
- Directed by: Erion Bubullima
- Written by: Olsi Cala, Besnik Mustafaj
- Produced by: Bora Zemani; Donald Veshaj
- Starring: Bora Zemani, Donald Veshaj, Egla Ceno
- Cinematography: Shpëtim Baça
- Edited by: Mentor Selmani
- Production company: Top Channel Films
- Distributed by: Top Channel Films
- Release date: December 13, 2023
- Running time: 105 minutes
- Country: Albania
- Language: Albanian

5 Times No (Albanian: 5 Herë Jo) is a 2023 Albanian romantic comedy film directed by Erion Bubullima and produced by Top Channel Films. The film stars Bora Zemani and Donald Veshaj as television producers whose professional rivalry evolves into personal conflict. It was released in Albanian cinemas on 13 December 2023.

== Synopsis ==
The story takes place within Albania's largest television platform. Jora (Bora Zemani) and Gjergji (Donald Veshaj) are producers competing for the same broadcast slot. Their rivalry with Klara (Egla Ceno), another producer, leads to a series of confrontations that combine comedic and romantic elements.

== Cast ==
- Bora Zemani as Jora
- Donald Veshaj as Gjergji
- Egla Ceno as Klara
- Margent Caushi
- Xhejni Fama
- Enisa Hysa
- Agron Llakaj as Shefiti
- Jorida Meta
- Albano Prodani
- Mehmet Xhelili
- Xhevahir Zeneli

== Production ==
5 Times No was produced by Top Channel Films. Filming took place over the course of about a month.

== Release ==
The film premiered at Cineplexx cinemas on 12 December 2023, followed by a wider release in Albania on 13 December. It was also screened in Kosovo shortly after its domestic premiere.

== Reception ==
Media coverage highlighted the film's focus on rivalry and relationships. Audience responses noted the film's humor and its contrast to other recent Albanian romantic comedies.
