= 2002 FIVB Men's Volleyball World Championship qualification =

- Dates: 28 January 2002 – 2 September 2002
- Teams: 64 (from 5 confederations)

24 teams competed in the 2002 FIVB Men's Volleyball World Championship, with two places allocated for the hosts, Argentina and the titleholder, Italy. In the qualification process for the 2002 FIVB World Championship, the Five FIVB confederations were allocated a share of the 22 remaining spots.

== Confederation qualification processes ==
The distribution by confederation for the 2002 FIVB Men's Volleyball World Championship was:

- Asia and Oceania (AVC): 5 places
- Africa (CAVB): 2 places
- Europe (CEV): 10 places (+ Italy qualified automatically as the defending champions for a total of 11 places)
- South America (CSV) 1.5 places (+ Argentina qualified automatically as host nation for a total of 2.5 places)
- North America (NORCECA): 3.5 places

== Africa ==
10 national teams entered qualification. (South Africa and Ghana later withdrew) The teams were distributed according to their position in the FIVB Senior Men's Rankings. Teams ranked 1–6 automatically qualified for the second round.

Sub Pool A	Pool A	Pool B
Nigeria; Kenya; Namibia; ~~South Africa~~	Egypt; Cameroon; Morocco; 1st Sub Pool A	Algeria; Tunisia; ~~Ghana~~; 2nd Sub Pool A

=== Sub Pool A ===
- Venue: Benin City, Nigeria
- Dates: January 28–30, 2001

Pos	Team	Pld	W	L	Pts	SW	SL	SR	SPW	SPL	SPR
1	Nigeria	2	2	0	4	6	1	6.000	169	117	1.444
2	Kenya	2	1	1	3	4	3	1.333	157	128	1.227
3	Namibia	2	0	2	2	0	6	0.000	69	150	0.460

Date		Score		Set 1	Set 2	Set 3	Set 4	Set 5	Total
28 Jan	Kenya	3–0	Namibia	25–14	25–9	25–11			75–34
29 Jan	Nigeria	3–0	Namibia	25–11	25–6	25–18			75–35
30 Jan	Nigeria	3–1	Kenya	25–20	19–25	25–22	25–15		94–82

=== Pool A ===
- Venue: Cairo, Egypt
- Dates: August 10–12, 2001

Pos	Team	Pld	W	L	Pts	SW	SL	SR	SPW	SPL	SPR
1	Egypt	3	3	0	6	9	3	3.000	281	243	1.156
2	Cameroon	3	1	2	4	5	6	0.833	242	240	1.008
3	Nigeria	3	1	2	4	5	6	0.833	238	251	0.948
4	Morocco	3	1	2	4	4	8	0.500	252	279	0.903

Date		Score		Set 1	Set 2	Set 3	Set 4	Set 5	Total
10 Aug	Cameroon	3–0	Nigeria	25–20	25–22	25–17			75–59
10 Aug	Egypt	3–1	Morocco	25–23	20–25	25–14	25–19		95–81
11 Aug	Morocco	3–2	Cameroon	25–21	25–23	20–25	19–25	17–15	106–109
11 Aug	Egypt	3–2	Nigeria	23–25	25–22	25–21	23–25	15–11	111–104
12 Aug	Morocco	0–3	Nigeria	23–25	19–25	23–25			65–75
12 Aug	Egypt	3–0	Cameroon	25–20	25–18	25–20			75–58

=== Pool B ===
- Venue: Algiers, Algeria
- Dates: August 9–11, 2001

Pos	Team	Pld	W	L	Pts	SW	SL	SR	SPW	SPL	SPR
1	Tunisia	2	2	0	4	6	0	MAX	154	107	1.439
2	Algeria	2	1	1	3	3	3	1.000	127	127	1.000
3	Kenya	2	0	2	2	0	6	0.000	106	153	0.693

Date		Score		Set 1	Set 2	Set 3	Set 4	Set 5	Total
09 Aug	Algeria	3–0	Kenya	25–17	25–18	25–16			75–51
10 Aug	Tunisia	3–0	Kenya	25–14	25–15	28–26			78–55
11 Aug	Algeria	0–3	Tunisia	13–25	24–26	15–25			52–76

== Asia and Oceania ==
12 national teams entered qualification.

Pool C	Pool D	Pool E
South Korea; Indonesia; Kazakhstan; Uzbekistan	Qatar; Japan; Chinese Taipei; India	China; Australia; Thailand; Saudi Arabia

=== Pool C ===
- Venue: Almaty, Kazakhstan
- Dates: August 3–5, 2001

Pos	Team	Pld	W	L	Pts	SW	SL	SR	SPW	SPL	SPR
1	South Korea	3	3	0	6	9	0	MAX	225	124	1.815
2	Kazakhstan	3	2	1	5	6	3	2.000	202	190	1.063
3	Indonesia	3	1	2	4	3	7	0.429	194	245	0.792
4	Uzbekistan	3	0	3	3	1	9	0.111	194	256	0.758

Date		Score		Set 1	Set 2	Set 3	Set 4	Set 5	Total
03 Aug	South Korea	3–0	Uzbekistan	25–13	25–12	25–16			75–41
03 Aug	Indonesia	0–3	Kazakhstan	19–25	21–25	17–25			57–75
04 Aug	Uzbekistan	0–3	Kazakhstan	14–25	19–25	25–27			58–77
04 Aug	South Korea	3–0	Indonesia	25–17	25–9	25–7			75–33
05 Aug	Indonesia	3–1	Uzbekistan	23–25	30–28	26–24	25–18		104–95
05 Aug	Kazakhstan	0–3	South Korea	14–25	15–25	21–25			50–75

=== Pool D ===
- Venue: Doha, Qatar
- Dates: August 10–12, 2001

Pos	Team	Pld	W	L	Pts	SW	SL	SR	SPW	SPL	SPR
1	Japan	3	3	0	6	9	2	4.500	266	225	1.182
2	India	3	2	1	5	7	5	1.400	285	252	1.131
3	Chinese Taipei	3	1	2	4	4	6	0.667	214	225	0.951
4	Qatar	3	0	3	3	2	9	0.222	204	267	0.764

Date		Score		Set 1	Set 2	Set 3	Set 4	Set 5	Total
10 Aug	India	3–1	Chinese Taipei	25–13	23–25	25–23	25–19		98–80
10 Aug	Qatar	1–3	Japan	21–25	17–25	25–19	14–25		77–94
11 Aug	Japan	3–0	Chinese Taipei	25–21	25–21	25–17			75–59
11 Aug	Qatar	1–3	India	17–25	19–25	25–23	14–25		75–98
12 Aug	Japan	3–1	India	22–25	25–20	25–23	25–21		97–89
12 Aug	Qatar	0–3	Chinese Taipei	19–25	19–25	14–25			52–75

=== Pool E ===
- Venue: Macau
- Dates: August 28–30, 2001

Pos	Team	Pld	W	L	Pts	SW	SL	SR	SPW	SPL	SPR
1	China	3	3	0	6	9	0	MAX	225	172	1.308
2	Australia	3	2	1	5	6	4	1.500	233	215	1.084
3	Thailand	3	1	2	4	4	6	0.667	215	246	0.874
4	Saudi Arabia	3	0	3	3	0	9	0.000	186	226	0.823

Date		Score		Set 1	Set 2	Set 3	Set 4	Set 5	Total
28 Aug	Australia	3–0	Saudi Arabia	25–16	25–21	25–18			75–55
28 Aug	China	3–0	Thailand	25–23	25–18	25–13			75–54
29 Aug	Australia	3–1	Thailand	25–14	25–21	27–29	25–21		102–85
29 Aug	China	3–0	Saudi Arabia	25–22	25–20	25–20			75–62
30 Aug	Thailand	3–0	Saudi Arabia	25–23	26–24	25–22			76–69
30 Aug	China	3–0	Australia	25–18	25–20	25–18			75–56

=== Second placed teams ===
Pos	Team	Pld	W	L	Pts	SW	SL	SR	SPW	SPL	SPR
1	Kazakhstan	3	2	1	5	6	3	2.000	202	190	1.063
2	Australia	3	2	1	5	6	4	1.500	233	215	1.084
3	India	3	2	1	5	7	5	1.400	285	252	1.131

== Europe ==
28 national teams entered qualification.

Pool F	Pool G	Pool H	Pool I
Spain; Austria; Croatia; Norway	Netherlands; Portugal; Denmark; Israel	Czech Republic; Ukraine; Hungary; Slovenia	Poland; France; Latvia; Moldova
Pool J	Pool K	Pool L	
Slovakia; Bulgaria; Belgium; Romania	Finland; Yugoslavia; Germany; Bosnia and Herzegovina	Russia; Greece; Turkey; Estonia	

=== Pool F ===
- Venue: Seville, Spain
- Dates: July 12–14, 2001

Pos	Team	Pld	W	L	Pts	SW	SL	SR	SPW	SPL	SPR
1	Spain	3	3	0	6	9	2	4.500	265	204	1.299
2	Croatia	3	2	1	5	8	3	2.667	259	205	1.263
3	Austria	3	1	2	4	3	6	0.500	161	215	0.749
4	Norway	3	0	3	3	0	9	0.000	165	226	0.730

Date		Score		Set 1	Set 2	Set 3	Set 4	Set 5	Total
12 Jul	Croatia	3–0	Norway	25–16	25–22	25–14			75–52
12 Jul	Spain	3–0	Austria	25–21	25–8	25–18			75–47
13 Jul	Austria	0–3	Croatia	12–25	12–25	14–25			38–75
13 Jul	Spain	3–0	Norway	25–22	25–10	25–16			75–48
14 Jul	Spain	3–2	Croatia	25–22	30–28	24–26	21–25	15–8	115–109
14 Jul	Norway	0–3	Austria	19–25	24–26	22–25			65–76

=== Pool G ===
- Venue: 's-Hertogenbosch, Netherlands
- Dates: June 24–26, 2001

Pos	Team	Pld	W	L	Pts	SW	SL	SR	SPW	SPL	SPR
1	Netherlands	3	3	0	6	9	1	9.000	248	207	1.198
2	Portugal	3	2	1	5	7	3	2.333	238	212	1.123
3	Denmark	3	1	2	4	3	7	0.429	219	242	0.905
4	Israel	3	0	3	3	1	9	0.111	202	246	0.821

Date		Score		Set 1	Set 2	Set 3	Set 4	Set 5	Total
24 Jun	Denmark	0–3	Portugal	17–25	23–25	26–28			66–78
24 Jun	Netherlands	3–0	Israel	25–21	25–23	25–21			75–65
25 Jun	Israel	1–3	Denmark	25–21	22–25	20–25	22–25		89–96
25 Jun	Portugal	1–3	Netherlands	21–25	19–25	25–23	20–25		85–98
26 Jun	Israel	0–3	Portugal	16–25	21–25	11–25			48–75
26 Jun	Netherlands	3–0	Denmark	25–23	25–18	25–16			75–57

=== Pool H ===
- Venue: Ostrava, Czech Republic
- Dates: June 22–24, 2001

Pos	Team	Pld	W	L	Pts	SW	SL	SR	SPW	SPL	SPR
1	Czech Republic	3	3	0	6	9	1	9.000	254	210	1.210
2	Ukraine	3	2	1	5	7	4	1.750	265	246	1.077
3	Hungary	3	1	2	4	4	7	0.571	236	261	0.904
4	Slovenia	3	0	3	3	1	9	0.111	213	251	0.849

Date		Score		Set 1	Set 2	Set 3	Set 4	Set 5	Total
22 Jun	Czech Republic	3–0	Slovenia	25–16	25–22	26–24			76–62
22 Jun	Ukraine	3–1	Hungary	25–17	25–18	23–25	25–20		98–80
23 Jun	Slovenia	0–3	Ukraine	16–25	26–28	21–25			63–78
23 Jun	Hungary	0–3	Czech Republic	19–25	22–25	18–25			59–75
24 Jun	Czech Republic	3–1	Ukraine	25–23	28–30	25–18	25–18		103–89
24 Jun	Hungary	3–1	Slovenia	18–25	29–27	25–19	25–17		97–88

=== Pool I ===
- Venue: Łódź, Poland
- Dates: August 31 – September 2, 2001

Pos	Team	Pld	W	L	Pts	SW	SL	SR	SPW	SPL	SPR
1	France	3	3	0	6	9	1	9.000	244	196	1.245
2	Poland	3	2	1	5	6	3	2.000	217	187	1.160
3	Latvia	3	1	2	4	4	6	0.667	215	219	0.982
4	Moldova	3	0	3	3	0	9	0.000	151	225	0.671

Date		Score		Set 1	Set 2	Set 3	Set 4	Set 5	Total
31 Aug	Poland	3–0	Moldova	25–16	25–18	25–18			75–52
31 Aug	Latvia	1–3	France	22–25	25–14	21–25	17–25		85–89
01 Sep	Poland	3–0	Latvia	25–13	25–23	25–19			75–55
01 Sep	Moldova	0–3	France	14–25	17–25	13–25			44–75
02 Sep	Moldova	0–3	Latvia	22–25	16–25	17–25			55–75
02 Sep	Poland	0–3	France	28–30	18–25	21–25			67–80

=== Pool J ===
- Venue: Prešov, Slovakia
- Dates: August 24–26, 2001

Pos	Team	Pld	W	L	Pts	SW	SL	SR	SPW	SPL	SPR
1	Bulgaria	3	2	1	5	7	3	2.333	246	222	1.108
2	Slovakia	3	2	1	5	6	4	1.500	231	226	1.022
3	Belgium	3	1	2	4	4	7	0.571	243	267	0.910
4	Romania	3	1	2	4	3	6	0.500	207	212	0.976

Date		Score		Set 1	Set 2	Set 3	Set 4	Set 5	Total
24 Aug	Romania	0–3	Slovakia	21–25	23–25	22–25			66–75
24 Aug	Bulgaria	1–3	Belgium	25–19	22–25	22–25	26–28		95–97
25 Aug	Belgium	1–3	Slovakia	21–25	25–22	20–25	19–25		85–97
25 Aug	Bulgaria	3–0	Romania	25–19	26–24	25–23			76–66
26 Aug	Slovakia	0–3	Bulgaria	18–25	18–25	23–25			59–75
26 Aug	Romania	3–0	Belgium	25–23	25–17	25–21			75–61

=== Pool K ===
- Venue: Tampere, Finland
- Dates: August 17–19, 2001

Pos	Team	Pld	W	L	Pts	SW	SL	SR	SPW	SPL	SPR
1	Yugoslavia	3	3	0	6	9	3	3.000	295	244	1.209
2	Finland	3	2	1	5	7	4	1.750	260	225	1.156
3	Germany	3	1	2	4	5	6	0.833	246	264	0.932
4	Bosnia and Herzegovina	3	0	3	3	1	9	0.111	180	248	0.726

Date		Score		Set 1	Set 2	Set 3	Set 4	Set 5	Total
17 Aug	Finland	3–0	Bosnia and Herzegovina	25–13	25–14	25–17			75–44
17 Aug	Germany	1–3	Yugoslavia	19–25	28–26	17–25	22–25		86–101
18 Aug	Finland	3–1	Germany	25–27	25–19	25–21	25–18		100–85
18 Aug	Yugoslavia	3–1	Bosnia and Herzegovina	23–25	25–14	25–15	25–19		98–73
19 Aug	Finland	1–3	Yugoslavia	19–25	18–25	25–21	23–25		85–96
19 Aug	Bosnia and Herzegovina	0–3	Germany	21–25	21–25	21–25			63–75

=== Pool L ===
- Venue: Bursa, Turkey
- Dates: July 6–8, 2001

Pos	Team	Pld	W	L	Pts	SW	SL	SR	SPW	SPL	SPR
1	Greece	3	3	0	6	9	3	3.000	285	249	1.145
2	Russia	3	2	1	5	7	3	2.333	236	210	1.124
3	Turkey	3	1	2	4	5	6	0.833	230	243	0.947
4	Estonia	3	0	3	3	0	9	0.000	184	233	0.790

Date		Score		Set 1	Set 2	Set 3	Set 4	Set 5	Total
06 Jul	Turkey	3–0	Estonia	25–23	25–21	25–19			75–63
06 Jul	Russia	1–3	Greece	24–26	20–25	25–21	17–25		86–97
07 Jul	Russia	3–0	Estonia	25–11	25–22	25–23			75–56
07 Jul	Turkey	2–3	Greece	25–20	25–20	19–25	18–25	11–15	98–105
08 Jul	Greece	3–0	Estonia	25–18	33–31	25–16			83–65
08 Jul	Turkey	0–3	Russia	20–25	18–25	19–25			57–75

=== Second placed teams ===
Pos	Team	Pld	W	L	Pts	SW	SL	SR	SPW	SPL	SPR
1	Croatia	3	2	1	5	8	3	2.667	259	205	1.263
2	Russia	3	2	1	5	7	3	2.333	236	210	1.124
3	Portugal	3	2	1	5	7	3	2.333	238	212	1.123
4	Poland	3	2	1	5	6	3	2.000	217	187	1.160
5	Finland	3	2	1	5	7	4	1.750	260	225	1.156
6	Ukraine	3	2	1	5	7	4	1.750	265	246	1.077
7	Slovakia	3	2	1	5	6	4	1.500	231	226	1.022

== North America ==
10 national teams entered qualification. The teams were distributed according to their position in the FIVB Senior Men's Rankings. Teams ranked 1–6 automatically qualified for the second round.

Sub Pool B	Pool M	Pool N
Jamaica; Dominican Republic; Aruba; Netherlands Antilles	Cuba; Mexico; Puerto Rico; 2nd Sub Pool B	United States; Canada; Barbados; 1st Sub Pool B

=== Sub Pool B ===
- Venue: Oranjestad, Aruba
- Dates: June 13–17, 2001

Pos	Team	Pld	W	L	Pts	SW	SL	SR	SPW	SPL	SPR
1	Dominican Republic	3	3	0	6	9	0	MAX	225	132	1.705
2	Netherlands Antilles	3	2	1	5	6	3	2.000	199	188	1.059
3	Jamaica	3	1	2	4	3	8	0.375	204	254	0.803
4	Aruba	3	0	3	3	2	9	0.222	204	258	0.791

Date		Score		Set 1	Set 2	Set 3	Set 4	Set 5	Total
13 Jun	Aruba	0–3	Netherlands Antilles	22–25	22–25	15–25			59–75
13 Jun	Dominican Republic	3–0	Jamaica	25–10	25–15	25–17			75–42
14 Jun	Aruba	2–3	Jamaica	28–26	25–17	19–25	19–25	13–15	104–108
15 Jun	Jamaica	0–3	Netherlands Antilles	19–25	16–25	19–25			54–75
16 Jun	Aruba	0–3	Dominican Republic	18–25	14–25	9–25			41–75
17 Jun	Dominican Republic	3–0	Netherlands Antilles	25–16	25–13	25–20			75–49

=== Pool M ===
- Venue: Havana, Cuba
- Dates: July 27–29, 2001

Pos	Team	Pld	W	L	Pts	SW	SL	SR	SPW	SPL	SPR
1	Cuba	3	3	0	6	9	0	MAX	227	141	1.610
2	Mexico	3	2	1	5	6	4	1.500	229	197	1.162
3	Puerto Rico	3	1	2	4	4	6	0.667	203	219	0.927
4	Netherlands Antilles	3	0	3	3	0	9	0.000	123	225	0.547

Date		Score		Set 1	Set 2	Set 3	Set 4	Set 5	Total
27 Jul	Mexico	3–1	Puerto Rico	25–19	18–25	25–19	25–18		93–81
27 Jul	Cuba	3–0	Netherlands Antilles	25–9	25–12	25–12			75–33
28 Jul	Mexico	3–0	Netherlands Antilles	25–15	25–14	25–10			75–39
28 Jul	Cuba	3–0	Puerto Rico	25–19	25–13	25–15			75–47
29 Jul	Netherlands Antilles	0–3	Puerto Rico	20–25	15–25	16–25			51–75
29 Jul	Cuba	3–0	Mexico	27–25	25–14	25–22			77–61

=== Pool N ===
- Venue: Winnipeg, Canada
- Dates: July 26–28, 2001

Pos	Team	Pld	W	L	Pts	SW	SL	SR	SPW	SPL	SPR
1	Canada	3	3	0	6	9	2	4.500	263	206	1.277
2	United States	3	2	1	5	8	3	2.667	259	212	1.222
3	Dominican Republic	3	1	2	4	3	6	0.500	184	188	0.979
4	Barbados	3	0	3	3	0	9	0.000	125	225	0.556

Date		Score		Set 1	Set 2	Set 3	Set 4	Set 5	Total
26 Jul	United States	3–0	Dominican Republic	25–19	25–17	25–18			75–54
26 Jul	Canada	3–0	Barbados	25–17	25–13	25–12			75–42
27 Jul	United States	3–0	Barbados	25–18	25–17	25–10			75–45
27 Jul	Canada	3–0	Dominican Republic	25–21	25–21	25–13			75–55
28 Jul	Barbados	0–3	Dominican Republic	12–25	13–25	13–25			38–75
28 Jul	Canada	3–2	United States	21–25	25–16	29–27	20–25	18–16	113–109

=== Second placed teams ===
Pos	Team	Pld	W	L	Pts	SW	SL	SR	SPW	SPL	SPR
1	United States	3	2	1	5	8	3	2.667	259	212	1.222
2	Mexico	3	2	1	5	6	4	1.500	229	197	1.162

== South America ==
4 national teams entered qualification but Peru later withdrew.

Pool O

Brazil
Venezuela
Chile
~~Peru~~

=== Pool O ===
- Venue: São Caetano do Sul, Brazil
- Dates: July 26–28, 2001

Pos	Team	Pld	W	L	Pts	SW	SL	SR	SPW	SPL	SPR
1	Brazil	2	2	0	4	6	0	MAX	150	88	1.705
2	Venezuela	2	1	1	3	3	3	1.000	128	117	1.094
3	Chile	2	0	2	2	0	6	0.000	77	150	0.513

Date		Score		Set 1	Set 2	Set 3	Set 4	Set 5	Total
26 Jul	Venezuela	3–0	Chile	25–11	25–16	25–15			75–42
27 Jul	Brazil	3–0	Chile	25–11	25–16	25–8			75–35
28 Jul	Brazil	3–0	Venezuela	25–22	25–20	25–11			75–53

== Playoff ==
- Venue: Caracas, Venezuela
- Dates: September 1–2, 2001

Pos	Team	Pld	W	L	Pts	SW	SL	SR	SPW	SPL	SPR
1	Venezuela	2	2	0	4	6	1	6.000	177	146	1.212
2	Mexico	2	0	2	2	1	6	0.167	146	177	0.825

Date		Score		Set 1	Set 2	Set 3	Set 4	Set 5	Total
01 Sep	Mexico	0–3	Venezuela	22–25	19–25	18–25			59–75
02 Sep	Mexico	1–3	Venezuela	18–25	25–22	16–25	28–30		87–102
