= 2002 FIVB Men's Volleyball World Championship =

15th edition of the event

2002 FIVB World Championship

Tournament details
- Host country: Argentina
- Dates: September 28 – October 13
- Teams: 24
- Venues: 6 (in 6 host cities)
- Officially opened by: Eduardo Duhalde

Final positions
- Champions: Brazil (1st title)

Tournament awards
- MVP: (Argentina) Marcos Milinkovic

Tournament statistics
- Matches played: 72
- Attendance: 371,061 (5,154 per match)

The 2002 FIVB Men's Volleyball World Championship was the 15th edition of the event, organised by the world's governing body, the FIVB. It was held in Salta, Córdoba, Mar del Plata, Buenos Aires, Santa Fé and San Juan in Argentina from September 28 to October 13, 2002. All times are Argentina Time (UTC−03:00).

== Qualification ==
| Africa (CAVB) | Asia and Oceania (AVC) | Europe (CEV) | North America (NORCECA) | South America (CSV) |
| Pool A Winners: Egypt; Pool B Winners: Tunisia | Pool C Winners: ~~South Korea~~*; Pool C Runners-up: Kazakhstan; Pool D Winners: Japan; Pool E Winners: China; Pool E Runners-up: Australia | 1998 World Champions: Italy; Pool F Winners: Spain; Pool F Runners-up: Croatia; Pool G Winners: Netherlands; Pool G Runners-up: Portugal; Pool H Winners: Czech Republic; Pool I Winners: France; Pool J Winners: Bulgaria; Pool K Winners: FR Yugoslavia; Pool L Winners: Greece; Pool L Runners-up: Russia | Pool M Winners: Cuba; Pool N Winners: Canada; Pool N Runners-up: United States | Host Country: Argentina; Pool O Winners: Brazil; NORCECA–CSV Playoff Winners: Venezuela |

* Due to the clash of dates with the 2002 Asian Games, South Korea withdrew from participating and FIVB give a wildcard to Poland instead.

== Pools composition ==
| Pool A | Pool B | Pool C | Pool D | Pool E | Pool F |
|---|---|---|---|---|---|
| Argentina; Australia; China; Portugal | Italy; Canada; Croatia; Poland | Bulgaria; France; Russia; Tunisia | FR Yugoslavia; Spain; Japan; Kazakhstan | Brazil; Egypt; United States; Venezuela | Cuba; Czech Republic; Greece; Netherlands |

== Venues ==
- Estadio Aldo Cantoni (San Juan) – Pool A except Argentina vs. Australia
- Estadio Ángel Malvicino (Santa Fé) – Pool B and J
- Luna Park (Buenos Aires) – Argentina vs. Australia, Pool C, G and Final round
- Estadio Polideportivo (Mar del Plata) – Pool D
- Orfeo Superdomo (Córdoba) – Pool E, H and Final round
- Polideportivo Delmi (Salta) – Pool F and K

== First round ==
=== Pool A ===
| Pos | Team | Pld | W | L | Pts | SW | SL | SR | SPW | SPL | SPR | Qualification |
|---|---|---|---|---|---|---|---|---|---|---|---|---|
| 1 | Argentina | 3 | 3 | 0 | 6 | 9 | 3 | 3.000 | 312 | 289 | 1.080 | Second round |
| 2 | Portugal | 3 | 2 | 1 | 5 | 7 | 5 | 1.400 | 286 | 267 | 1.071 | Second round |
| 3 | China | 3 | 1 | 2 | 4 | 5 | 7 | 0.714 | 270 | 282 | 0.957 | Second round |
| 4 | Australia | 3 | 0 | 3 | 3 | 3 | 9 | 0.333 | 282 | 312 | 0.904 | |

Source: FIVB

| Date | Time | | Score | | Set 1 | Set 2 | Set 3 | Set 4 | Set 5 | Total | Report |
|---|---|---|---|---|---|---|---|---|---|---|---|
| 28 Sep | 20:10 | Argentina | 3–1 | Australia | 22–25 | 25–18 | 31–29 | 32–30 | | 110–102 | P2 |
| 29 Sep | 11:10 | Portugal | 3–1 | China | 16–25 | 25–21 | 25–19 | 25–11 | | 91–76 | P2 |
| 30 Sep | 18:40 | Portugal | 3–1 | Australia | 25–20 | 25–27 | 25–21 | 29–27 | | 104–95 | P2 |
| 30 Sep | 21:10 | China | 1–3 | Argentina | 30–32 | 19–25 | 26–24 | 21–25 | | 96–106 | P2 |
| 01 Oct | 18:40 | Australia | 1–3 | China | 19–25 | 20–25 | 25–23 | 21–25 | | 85–98 | P2 |
| 01 Oct | 21:10 | Argentina | 3–1 | Portugal | 21–25 | 25–22 | 25–22 | 25–22 | | 96–91 | P2 |

=== Pool B ===
| Pos | Team | Pld | W | L | Pts | SW | SL | SR | SPW | SPL | SPR | Qualification |
|---|---|---|---|---|---|---|---|---|---|---|---|---|
| 1 | Poland | 3 | 3 | 0 | 6 | 9 | 3 | 3.000 | 282 | 254 | 1.110 | Second round |
| 2 | Italy | 3 | 2 | 1 | 5 | 8 | 3 | 2.667 | 255 | 228 | 1.118 | Second round |
| 3 | Canada | 3 | 1 | 2 | 4 | 4 | 7 | 0.571 | 251 | 261 | 0.962 | |
| 4 | Croatia | 3 | 0 | 3 | 3 | 1 | 9 | 0.111 | 202 | 247 | 0.818 | |

Source: FIVB

| Date | Time | | Score | | Set 1 | Set 2 | Set 3 | Set 4 | Set 5 | Total | Report |
|---|---|---|---|---|---|---|---|---|---|---|---|
| 29 Sep | 18:10 | Italy | 3–0 | Croatia | 25–18 | 25–20 | 25–20 | | | 75–58 | P2 |
| 29 Sep | 20:40 | Poland | 3–1 | Canada | 25–23 | 22–25 | 26–24 | 25–21 | | 98–93 | P2 |
| 30 Sep | 18:10 | Poland | 3–2 | Italy | 20–25 | 24–26 | 25–22 | 25–21 | 15–10 | 109–104 | P2 |
| 30 Sep | 20:40 | Canada | 3–1 | Croatia | 25–22 | 22–25 | 25–17 | 25–23 | | 97–87 | P2 |
| 01 Oct | 18:10 | Italy | 3–0 | Canada | 25–20 | 26–24 | 25–17 | | | 76–61 | P2 |
| 01 Oct | 20:40 | Croatia | 0–3 | Poland | 21–25 | 18–25 | 18–25 | | | 57–75 | P2 |

=== Pool C ===
| Pos | Team | Pld | W | L | Pts | SW | SL | SR | SPW | SPL | SPR | Qualification |
|---|---|---|---|---|---|---|---|---|---|---|---|---|
| 1 | France | 3 | 3 | 0 | 6 | 9 | 4 | 2.250 | 289 | 265 | 1.091 | Second round |
| 2 | Bulgaria | 3 | 2 | 1 | 5 | 8 | 4 | 2.000 | 292 | 257 | 1.136 | Second round |
| 3 | Russia | 3 | 1 | 2 | 4 | 4 | 6 | 0.667 | 222 | 221 | 1.005 | Second round |
| 4 | Tunisia | 3 | 0 | 3 | 3 | 2 | 9 | 0.222 | 214 | 274 | 0.781 | |

Source: FIVB

| Date | Time | | Score | | Set 1 | Set 2 | Set 3 | Set 4 | Set 5 | Total | Report |
|---|---|---|---|---|---|---|---|---|---|---|---|
| 29 Sep | 18:10 | Tunisia | 1–3 | France | 23–25 | 25–20 | 17–25 | 11–25 | | 76–95 | P2 |
| 29 Sep | 20:40 | Bulgaria | 3–0 | Russia | 28–26 | 25–19 | 25–23 | | | 78–68 | P2 |
| 30 Sep | 18:10 | Russia | 1–3 | France | 21–25 | 21–25 | 25–13 | 12–25 | | 79–88 | P2 |
| 30 Sep | 20:40 | Bulgaria | 3–1 | Tunisia | 21–25 | 33–31 | 25–12 | 25–15 | | 104–83 | P2 |
| 01 Oct | 18:10 | France | 3–2 | Bulgaria | 25–23 | 22–25 | 25–22 | 17–25 | 17–15 | 106–110 | P2 |
| 01 Oct | 20:40 | Tunisia | 0–3 | Russia | 19–25 | 13–25 | 23–25 | | | 55–75 | P2 |

=== Pool D ===
| Pos | Team | Pld | W | L | Pts | SW | SL | SR | SPW | SPL | SPR | Qualification |
|---|---|---|---|---|---|---|---|---|---|---|---|---|
| 1 | FR Yugoslavia | 3 | 3 | 0 | 6 | 9 | 1 | 9.000 | 246 | 188 | 1.309 | Second round |
| 2 | Spain | 3 | 2 | 1 | 5 | 7 | 6 | 1.167 | 293 | 287 | 1.021 | Second round |
| 3 | Japan | 3 | 1 | 2 | 4 | 5 | 7 | 0.714 | 269 | 274 | 0.982 | Second round |
| 4 | Kazakhstan | 3 | 0 | 3 | 3 | 2 | 9 | 0.222 | 218 | 277 | 0.787 | |

Source: FIVB

| Date | Time | | Score | | Set 1 | Set 2 | Set 3 | Set 4 | Set 5 | Total | Report |
|---|---|---|---|---|---|---|---|---|---|---|---|
| 29 Sep | 12:10 | Japan | 3–1 | Kazakhstan | 26–24 | 25–20 | 29–31 | 25–10 | | 105–85 | P2 |
| 29 Sep | 15:10 | Spain | 1–3 | FR Yugoslavia | 18–25 | 21–25 | 25–21 | 18–25 | | 82–96 | P2 |
| 30 Sep | 11:10 | Japan | 2–3 | Spain | 18–25 | 25–23 | 25–22 | 27–29 | 13–15 | 108–114 | P2 |
| 30 Sep | 14:10 | Kazakhstan | 0–3 | FR Yugoslavia | 19–25 | 16–25 | 15–25 | | | 50–75 | P2 |
| 01 Oct | 11:10 | FR Yugoslavia | 3–0 | Japan | 25–21 | 25–15 | 25–20 | | | 75–56 | P2 |
| 01 Oct | 14:10 | Spain | 3–1 | Kazakhstan | 22–25 | 25–16 | 25–21 | 25–21 | | 97–83 | P2 |

=== Pool E ===
| Pos | Team | Pld | W | L | Pts | SW | SL | SR | SPW | SPL | SPR | Qualification |
|---|---|---|---|---|---|---|---|---|---|---|---|---|
| 1 | United States | 3 | 3 | 0 | 6 | 9 | 3 | 3.000 | 300 | 277 | 1.083 | Second round |
| 2 | Brazil | 3 | 2 | 1 | 5 | 8 | 3 | 2.667 | 268 | 230 | 1.165 | Second round |
| 3 | Venezuela | 3 | 1 | 2 | 4 | 3 | 6 | 0.500 | 205 | 215 | 0.953 | |
| 4 | Egypt | 3 | 0 | 3 | 3 | 1 | 9 | 0.111 | 197 | 248 | 0.794 | |

Source: FIVB

| Date | Time | | Score | | Set 1 | Set 2 | Set 3 | Set 4 | Set 5 | Total | Report |
|---|---|---|---|---|---|---|---|---|---|---|---|
| 29 Sep | 14:10 | Venezuela | 0–3 | Brazil | 16–25 | 24–26 | 17–25 | | | 57–76 | P2 |
| 29 Sep | 16:40 | Egypt | 1–3 | United States | 22–25 | 25–23 | 20–25 | 20–25 | | 87–98 | P2 |
| 30 Sep | 15:10 | Brazil | 2–3 | United States | 22–25 | 25–20 | 27–25 | 31–33 | 12–15 | 117–118 | P2 |
| 30 Sep | 17:40 | Venezuela | 3–0 | Egypt | 25–14 | 25–22 | 25–19 | | | 75–55 | P2 |
| 01 Oct | 15:10 | Egypt | 0–3 | Brazil | 14–25 | 20–25 | 21–25 | | | 55–75 | P2 |
| 01 Oct | 17:40 | United States | 3–0 | Venezuela | 26–24 | 25–18 | 33–31 | | | 84–73 | P2 |

=== Pool F ===
| Pos | Team | Pld | W | L | Pts | SW | SL | SR | SPW | SPL | SPR | Qualification |
|---|---|---|---|---|---|---|---|---|---|---|---|---|
| 1 | Netherlands | 3 | 3 | 0 | 6 | 9 | 3 | 3.000 | 273 | 240 | 1.138 | Second round |
| 2 | Greece | 3 | 1 | 2 | 4 | 5 | 6 | 0.833 | 226 | 246 | 0.919 | Second round |
| 3 | Czech Republic | 3 | 1 | 2 | 4 | 6 | 8 | 0.750 | 311 | 309 | 1.006 | Second round |
| 4 | Cuba | 3 | 1 | 2 | 4 | 4 | 7 | 0.571 | 245 | 260 | 0.942 | |

Source: FIVB

| Date | Time | | Score | | Set 1 | Set 2 | Set 3 | Set 4 | Set 5 | Total | Report |
|---|---|---|---|---|---|---|---|---|---|---|---|
| 29 Sep | 13:10 | Netherlands | 3–0 | Greece | 25–15 | 25–15 | 25–22 | | | 75–52 | P2 |
| 29 Sep | 15:40 | Czech Republic | 1–3 | Cuba | 30–28 | 22–25 | 19–25 | 23–25 | | 94–103 | P2 |
| 30 Sep | 13:10 | Greece | 3–0 | Cuba | 25–21 | 25–21 | 25–19 | | | 75–61 | P2 |
| 30 Sep | 15:40 | Netherlands | 3–2 | Czech Republic | 15–25 | 27–25 | 25–19 | 25–27 | 15–11 | 107–107 | P2 |
| 01 Oct | 13:10 | Cuba | 1–3 | Netherlands | 18–25 | 17–25 | 25–16 | 21–25 | | 81–91 | P2 |
| 01 Oct | 15:40 | Czech Republic | 3–2 | Greece | 22–25 | 25–22 | 23–25 | 25–17 | 15–10 | 110–99 | P2 |

=== Third placed teams ===
| Pos | Team | Pld | W | L | Pts | SW | SL | SR | SPW | SPL | SPR | Qualification |
|---|---|---|---|---|---|---|---|---|---|---|---|---|
| 1 | Czech Republic | 3 | 1 | 2 | 4 | 6 | 8 | 0.750 | 311 | 309 | 1.006 | Second round |
| 2 | Japan | 3 | 1 | 2 | 4 | 5 | 7 | 0.714 | 269 | 274 | 0.982 | Second round |
| 3 | China | 3 | 1 | 2 | 4 | 5 | 7 | 0.714 | 270 | 282 | 0.957 | Second round |
| 4 | Russia | 3 | 1 | 2 | 4 | 4 | 6 | 0.667 | 222 | 221 | 1.005 | Second round |
| 5 | Canada | 3 | 1 | 2 | 4 | 4 | 7 | 0.571 | 251 | 261 | 0.962 | |
| 6 | Venezuela | 3 | 1 | 2 | 4 | 3 | 6 | 0.500 | 205 | 215 | 0.953 | |

Source: FIVB

== Second round ==
=== Pool G ===
| Pos | Team | Pld | W | L | Pts | SW | SL | SR | SPW | SPL | SPR | Qualification |
|---|---|---|---|---|---|---|---|---|---|---|---|---|
| 1 | Argentina | 3 | 3 | 0 | 6 | 9 | 4 | 2.250 | 308 | 271 | 1.137 | Quarterfinals |
| 2 | Italy | 3 | 2 | 1 | 5 | 7 | 6 | 1.167 | 305 | 292 | 1.045 | Quarterfinals |
| 3 | Japan | 3 | 1 | 2 | 4 | 6 | 8 | 0.750 | 301 | 320 | 0.941 | |
| 4 | Bulgaria | 3 | 0 | 3 | 3 | 5 | 9 | 0.556 | 296 | 327 | 0.905 | |

Source: FIVB

| Date | Time | | Score | | Set 1 | Set 2 | Set 3 | Set 4 | Set 5 | Total | Report |
|---|---|---|---|---|---|---|---|---|---|---|---|
| 04 Oct | 18:40 | Italy | 3–2 | Bulgaria | 31–33 | 25–22 | 23–25 | 25–18 | 15–13 | 119–111 | P2 |
| 04 Oct | 21:10 | Argentina | 3–2 | Japan | 25–21 | 21–25 | 25–27 | 25–21 | 16–14 | 112–108 | P2 |
| 05 Oct | 18:40 | Japan | 1–3 | Italy | 18–25 | 20–25 | 28–26 | 16–25 | | 82–101 | P2 |
| 05 Oct | 21:10 | Argentina | 3–1 | Bulgaria | 25–20 | 22–25 | 25–14 | 25–19 | | 97–78 | P2 |
| 06 Oct | 17:40 | Japan | 3–2 | Bulgaria | 25–19 | 25–23 | 22–25 | 22–25 | 17–15 | 111–107 | P2 |
| 06 Oct | 20:10 | Argentina | 3–1 | Italy | 25–17 | 24–26 | 25–22 | 25–20 | | 99–85 | P2 |

=== Pool H ===
| Pos | Team | Pld | W | L | Pts | SW | SL | SR | SPW | SPL | SPR | Qualification |
|---|---|---|---|---|---|---|---|---|---|---|---|---|
| 1 | Russia | 3 | 3 | 0 | 6 | 9 | 4 | 2.250 | 299 | 263 | 1.137 | Quarterfinals |
| 2 | Portugal | 3 | 2 | 1 | 5 | 6 | 6 | 1.000 | 272 | 278 | 0.978 | Quarterfinals |
| 3 | Poland | 3 | 1 | 2 | 4 | 6 | 7 | 0.857 | 299 | 292 | 1.024 | |
| 4 | Spain | 3 | 0 | 3 | 3 | 5 | 9 | 0.556 | 284 | 321 | 0.885 | |

Source: FIVB

| Date | Time | | Score | | Set 1 | Set 2 | Set 3 | Set 4 | Set 5 | Total | Report |
|---|---|---|---|---|---|---|---|---|---|---|---|
| 04 Oct | 17:10 | Portugal | 3–2 | Spain | 19–25 | 22–25 | 25–21 | 25–20 | 15–13 | 106–104 | P2 |
| 04 Oct | 19:40 | Poland | 2–3 | Russia | 25–22 | 19–25 | 20–25 | 25–22 | 11–15 | 100–109 | P2 |
| 05 Oct | 17:10 | Spain | 2–3 | Russia | 25–23 | 22–25 | 28–26 | 16–25 | 13–15 | 104–114 | P2 |
| 05 Oct | 19:40 | Poland | 1–3 | Portugal | 22–25 | 34–32 | 20–25 | 22–25 | | 98–107 | P2 |
| 06 Oct | 17:10 | Portugal | 0–3 | Russia | 24–26 | 15–25 | 20–25 | | | 59–76 | P2 |
| 06 Oct | 19:40 | Spain | 1–3 | Poland | 19–25 | 11–25 | 28–26 | 18–25 | | 76–101 | P2 |

=== Pool J ===
| Pos | Team | Pld | W | L | Pts | SW | SL | SR | SPW | SPL | SPR | Qualification |
|---|---|---|---|---|---|---|---|---|---|---|---|---|
| 1 | Brazil | 3 | 3 | 0 | 6 | 9 | 0 | MAX | 225 | 181 | 1.243 | Quarterfinals |
| 2 | France | 3 | 2 | 1 | 5 | 6 | 4 | 1.500 | 238 | 216 | 1.102 | Quarterfinals |
| 3 | Netherlands | 3 | 1 | 2 | 4 | 3 | 8 | 0.375 | 230 | 257 | 0.895 | |
| 4 | Czech Republic | 3 | 0 | 3 | 3 | 3 | 9 | 0.333 | 249 | 288 | 0.865 | |

Source: FIVB

| Date | Time | | Score | | Set 1 | Set 2 | Set 3 | Set 4 | Set 5 | Total | Report |
|---|---|---|---|---|---|---|---|---|---|---|---|
| 04 Oct | 16:10 | Brazil | 3–0 | Czech Republic | 25–20 | 25–16 | 25–22 | | | 75–58 | P2 |
| 04 Oct | 18:40 | Netherlands | 0–3 | France | 24–26 | 16–25 | 16–25 | | | 56–76 | P2 |
| 05 Oct | 14:10 | Brazil | 3–0 | France | 25–22 | 25–21 | 25–21 | | | 75–64 | P2 |
| 05 Oct | 16:40 | Netherlands | 3–2 | Czech Republic | 23–25 | 30–28 | 25–20 | 22–25 | 15–8 | 115–106 | P2 |
| 06 Oct | 14:10 | Brazil | 3–0 | Netherlands | 25–20 | 25–19 | 25–20 | | | 75–59 | P2 |
| 06 Oct | 16:40 | France | 3–1 | Czech Republic | 23–25 | 25–18 | 25–23 | 25–19 | | 98–85 | P2 |

=== Pool K ===
| Pos | Team | Pld | W | L | Pts | SW | SL | SR | SPW | SPL | SPR | Qualification |
|---|---|---|---|---|---|---|---|---|---|---|---|---|
| 1 | FR Yugoslavia | 3 | 3 | 0 | 6 | 9 | 1 | 9.000 | 246 | 210 | 1.171 | Quarterfinals |
| 2 | Greece | 3 | 2 | 1 | 5 | 6 | 6 | 1.000 | 255 | 253 | 1.008 | Quarterfinals |
| 3 | United States | 3 | 1 | 2 | 4 | 6 | 6 | 1.000 | 271 | 268 | 1.011 | |
| 4 | China | 3 | 0 | 3 | 3 | 1 | 9 | 0.111 | 208 | 249 | 0.835 | |

Source: FIVB

| Date | Time | | Score | | Set 1 | Set 2 | Set 3 | Set 4 | Set 5 | Total | Report |
|---|---|---|---|---|---|---|---|---|---|---|---|
| 04 Oct | 17:40 | FR Yugoslavia | 3–0 | Greece | 25–21 | 25–17 | 25–21 | | | 75–59 | P2 |
| 04 Oct | 20:10 | United States | 3–0 | China | 25–23 | 30–28 | 25–19 | | | 80–70 | P2 |
| 05 Oct | 17:40 | China | 0–3 | FR Yugoslavia | 20–25 | 18–25 | 22–25 | | | 60–75 | P2 |
| 05 Oct | 20:10 | United States | 2–3 | Greece | 25–20 | 15–25 | 20–25 | 25–15 | 15–17 | 100–102 | P2 |
| 06 Oct | 17:40 | Greece | 3–1 | China | 19–25 | 25–17 | 25–19 | 25–17 | | 94–78 | P2 |
| 06 Oct | 20:10 | FR Yugoslavia | 3–1 | United States | 25–22 | 25–21 | 21–25 | 25–23 | | 96–91 | P2 |

== Final round ==
Quarterfinals
October 9 – Buenos Aires
Argentina | 1
France | 3
October 9 – Buenos Aires
Russia | 3
Greece | 0
October 9 – Córdoba
Italy | 2
Brazil | 3
October 9 – Córdoba
Portugal | 0
FR Yugoslavia | 3

Semifinals
October 11 – Buenos Aires
France | 2
Russia | 3
October 10 – Córdoba
Brazil | 3
FR Yugoslavia | 1

Final
October 13 – Buenos Aires
Russia | 2
Brazil | 3
3rd place
October 12 – Buenos Aires
France | 3
FR Yugoslavia | 0

5th–8th places
October 11 – Buenos Aires
Argentina | 3
Greece | 0
October 10 – Córdoba
Italy | 3
Portugal | 0

5th place
October 13 – Buenos Aires
Argentina | 2
Italy | 3
7th place
October 12 – Buenos Aires
Greece | 3
Portugal | 2

=== Quarterfinals ===
| Date | Time | | Score | | Set 1 | Set 2 | Set 3 | Set 4 | Set 5 | Total | Report |
|---|---|---|---|---|---|---|---|---|---|---|---|
| 09 Oct | 16:10 | Portugal | 0–3 | FR Yugoslavia | 20–25 | 23–25 | 16–25 | | | 59–75 | P2 |
| 09 Oct | 18:40 | Russia | 3–0 | Greece | 25–22 | 25–22 | 25–21 | | | 75–65 | P2 |
| 09 Oct | 18:40 | Italy | 2–3 | Brazil | 23–25 | 23–25 | 25–23 | 28–26 | 13–15 | 112–114 | P2 |
| 09 Oct | 21:10 | Argentina | 1–3 | France | 25–14 | 27–29 | 23–25 | 18–25 | | 93–93 | P2 |

=== 5th–8th semifinals ===
| Date | Time | | Score | | Set 1 | Set 2 | Set 3 | Set 4 | Set 5 | Total | Report |
|---|---|---|---|---|---|---|---|---|---|---|---|
| 10 Oct | 18:40 | Italy | 3–0 | Portugal | 25–23 | 25–19 | 25–17 | | | 75–59 | P2 |
| 11 Oct | 21:10 | Argentina | 3–0 | Greece | 25–23 | 25–23 | 25–20 | | | 75–66 | P2 |

=== Semifinals ===
| Date | Time | | Score | | Set 1 | Set 2 | Set 3 | Set 4 | Set 5 | Total | Report |
|---|---|---|---|---|---|---|---|---|---|---|---|
| 10 Oct | 21:10 | Brazil | 3–1 | FR Yugoslavia | 26–24 | 22–25 | 27–25 | 25–23 | | 100–97 | P2 |
| 11 Oct | 18:40 | France | 2–3 | Russia | 19–25 | 25–16 | 20–25 | 25–21 | 9–15 | 98–102 | P2 |

=== 7th place ===
| Date | Time | | Score | | Set 1 | Set 2 | Set 3 | Set 4 | Set 5 | Total | Report |
|---|---|---|---|---|---|---|---|---|---|---|---|
| 12 Oct | 16:10 | Greece | 3–2 | Portugal | 21–25 | 25–20 | 23–25 | 25–21 | 15–12 | 109–103 | P2 |

=== 5th place ===
| Date | Time | | Score | | Set 1 | Set 2 | Set 3 | Set 4 | Set 5 | Total | Report |
|---|---|---|---|---|---|---|---|---|---|---|---|
| 13 Oct | 16:10 | Argentina | 2–3 | Italy | 29–27 | 17–25 | 22–25 | 25–22 | 22–24 | 115–123 | P2 |

=== 3rd place ===
| Date | Time | | Score | | Set 1 | Set 2 | Set 3 | Set 4 | Set 5 | Total | Report |
|---|---|---|---|---|---|---|---|---|---|---|---|
| 12 Oct | 18:40 | France | 3–0 | FR Yugoslavia | 25–23 | 25–23 | 25–16 | | | 75–62 | P2 |

=== Final ===
| Date | Time | | Score | | Set 1 | Set 2 | Set 3 | Set 4 | Set 5 | Total | Report |
|---|---|---|---|---|---|---|---|---|---|---|---|
| 13 Oct | 18:40 | Russia | 2–3 | Brazil | 25–23 | 25–27 | 20–25 | 25–23 | 13–15 | 108–113 | P2 |

== Final standing ==
| Rank | Team |
|---|---|
| 1st place, gold medalist(s) | Brazil |
| 2nd place, silver medalist(s) | Russia |
| 3rd place, bronze medalist(s) | France |
| 4 | FR Yugoslavia |
| 5 | Italy |
| 6 | Argentina |
| 7 | Greece |
| 8 | Portugal |
| 9 | Japan |
| 9 | Netherlands |
| 9 | Poland |
| 9 | United States |
| 13 | Bulgaria |
| 13 | China |
| 13 | Czech Republic |
| 13 | Spain |
| 17 | Canada |
| 17 | Venezuela |
| 19 | Australia |
| 19 | Croatia |
| 19 | Cuba |
| 19 | Egypt |
| 19 | Kazakhstan |
| 19 | Tunisia |

2002 Men's World champions

Brazil
1st title

Team Roster
Giovane, Henrique, Maurício, Giba, André, Sérgio, Anderson, Nalbert, Gustavo, Rodrigão, Ricardo, Dante
Head Coach: Bernardinho

== Awards ==
- MVP: (Argentina) Marcos Milinkovic
- Best scorer: (Argentina) Marcos Milinkovic
- Best spiker: (Brazil) André Nascimento
- Best blocker: (Portugal) João José
- Best server: (France) Franz Granvorka
- Best setter: (Brazil) Maurício Lima
- Best digger: (France) Hubert Henno
- Best receiver: (Argentina) Pablo Meana

== Super seven selection ==
- Setter: (Federal Republic of Yugoslavia) Nikola Grbić
- Outside hitters: (Russia) Sergey Tetyukhin and (France) Stéphane Antiga
- Middle blockers: (Brazil) Gustavo and (Portugal) João José
- Opposite: (Argentina) Marcos Milinkovic
- Libero: (France) Hubert Henno

== Marketing ==
=== Symbol ===
The official competition symbol the "Minto". The design is based on sport ball and volleyball.

=== Sponsors ===
- Cerveza Quilmes
- Visa
- Saputo Inc.

== Broadcasting ==
| Region | TV station |
|---|---|
| All countries | Telewizja Polska; TV Koha; HRT 1 NTV Plus; Pathé Sport; BNT; Czech Television; Globosat; Diario Meridiano; TBS; ERTT; Orbit; Dubai TV; RAI; TSN |
| Worldwide | ESPN International; ESPN (Latin America); ESPN 2 ESPN+ ESPN Pac Rim and ESPN Atlantic; ESPN Star Sports |
