= Within Love =

2023 Albanian romantic comedy film

- Film Poster of Within Love
- Në Kuadër të Dashurisë
- Directed by: Koloreto Cukali
- Written by: Koloreto Cukali
- Produced by: Olsi Abazi, Ledion Liço
- Starring: Ylber Bardhi, Besmir Bitraku, Sotiraq Bratko, Olta Daku, Luiz Ejlli, Olta Gixhari
- Cinematography: Rezart Gurashi
- Edited by: Blerina Muharremi
- Music by: Alban Male
- Production company: Top Channel Films
- Distributed by: Top Channel Films
- Release date: November 10, 2023
- Running time: 95 minutes
- Country: Albania
- Language: Albanian

Within Love (Albanian: Në Kuadër të Dashurisë) is a 2023 Albanian romantic comedy film written and directed by Koloreto Cukali. The film explores the dynamics of a married couple as they navigate the consequences of deciding to separate after ten years of marriage.

== Synopsis ==
The film follows Besi (Luiz Ejlli) and Jonida (Olta Gixhari), a couple married for ten years, who decide to end their relationship. Their decision affects not only their own lives but also their families, including relatives such as Dajua (Sotiraq Bratko) and Dojna (Olta Daku). Through various situations blending humor and romantic elements, the characters confront the boundaries and challenges of their relationships and the impact of their choices on those around them.

== Cast ==
- Luiz Ejlli as Besi — Husband of Jonida
- Olta Gixhari as Jonida — Wife of Besi
- Sara Hoxha as Aria — Sister of Jonida, daughter of the characters played by Ndriçim Xhepa and Zamira Kita
- Ndriçim Xhepa as Father of Aria and Jonida
- Zamira Kita as Mother of Aria and Jonida
- Besmir Bitraku as Vani — Businessman from Korçë in love with Aria
- Roerd Toçe as Klejdi — A bohemian designer who begins a relationship with Aria
- Sotiraq Bratko as Dajua — Relative
- Olta Daku as Dojna — Relative
- Aleksandër Grami — Supporting character
- Dea Mishel Hoxha — Supporting character
- Luan Jaha — Supporting character
- Salsano Rrapi — Supporting character
- Eni Shehu — Supporting character
- Koço Qendro — Supporting character
- Muzafer Zifla — Supporting character

== Production ==
Within Love was produced by Top Channel Films, the film production branch of the Albanian media company Top Channel. Principal photography took place in Tirana, Albania than in Korça. The film was released in Albanian cinemas on 10 November 2023.

== Release ==
The film premiered in Albania on 10 November 2023. It has also been screened internationally in selected regions including Switzerland and Greece.

== Reception ==
Critical reception noted the film's depiction of marital and family dynamics. Reviews focused on the performances of the main cast and the portrayal of interpersonal relationships.
