= Olsa Muhameti =

Albanian television producer and author (born 1985)

- Born: 22 August 1985 (age 41); Tirana, PSR Albania
- Education: University of Tirana
- Occupations: Executive producer, author
- Years active: 2000–present

Olsa Muhameti (born 22 August 1985) is an Albanian television author and executive producer. She has worked as a creator and executive producer on multiple television programmes in Albania and Kosovo, including the dating reality show Për'puthen and the reality series Big Brother VIP Kosova.

== Early life and education ==
Muhameti was born in Tirana, where she studied journalism at the University of Tirana.

== Career ==
Muhameti began her television career as a journalist at Vizion Plus and later at TV Koha. She subsequently spent approximately five years at TV Klan, during which she also contributed to ABC News.

She later joined Top Channel, where she worked as the creator of the dating program Për'puthen. She also created two seasons of Hell's Kitchen Albania and contributed to one season of the Sunday variety show E Diell.

In 2024, Muhameti served as the executive producer for the third edition of Big Brother VIP Kosova.
