= Top Channel Films =

Albanian film production and distribution company

- Company type: Subsidiary
- Industry: Film
- Founded: 2023; 3 years ago
- Headquarters: Tirana, Albania
- Key people: Ledion Liço (Executive Director)
- Products: Feature films
- Services: Film production; Film distribution
- Owner: Top Media Group
- Parent: Top Channel
- Website: films.top-channel.tv

Top Channel Films is an Albanian film production and distribution company, operating as the film division of Top Channel. It is part of the Top Media Group and was established in 2023. The company released its first feature film, Në Kuadër të Dashurisë (transl. "Within Love"), in 2023. Its executive director is Ledion Liço, who is also the art and innovation director of Top Channel.

== History ==
Top Channel Films was created in 2023 as an expansion of Top Channel into the film sector. Films produced or distributed through the company include Reality, Në Kuadër të Dashurisë, Legjenda e Bastunit, Guxim and 5 Herë Jo. These films have been made available in cinemas, on digital streaming platforms such as Digitalb, Amazon, Apple TV, Google Play, and on Top Channel's official YouTube channel.

== Platform and distribution ==
The company produces and distributes Albanian films, as well as international titles.

Its films are accessible through domestic cinemas, online streaming platforms, and Top Channel's official media channels.

== Filmography ==
=== Original productions ===
- Within Love (2023)
- Guxim (transl. "Courage") (2024)
- 5 Times No (2023)
- Reality (in production)

=== External productions ===
- Legjenda e Bastunit (transl. "The Legend of the Cane") (2022, distributed by Top Channel Films in 2024)

== See also ==
- Top Channel
- Top Media Group
