= Komuna e Parisit =

- Genre: Sitcom
- Created by: Erand Sojli
- Starring: Esela Pysqyli; Driada Matoshi; Erjola Meta; Lulzim Zeqja; Florian Agalliu; Xhejni Fama; Elvis Pupa; Merkur Bozgo; Ledio Lako; Romir Zalla; Zamira Kita
- Country of origin: Albania
- Original language: Albanian
- No. of seasons: 1
- No. of episodes: 20

Production
- Camera setup: Multi-camera
- Running time: 22 minutes
- Production company: Digitalb

Original release
- Network: Digi Gold; Top Channel
- Release: November 2, 2009 – March 1, 2010

Komuna e Parisit (The Municipality of Paris) is an Albanian sitcom, written by Erand Sojli and directed by Altin Basha. The series started on November 2, 2009 and finished in 2010.

== Plot ==
Set in "Komuna e Parisit", a street in Tirana, the series shows the life of a group of students living in this street.
