= StarTop =

Albanian reality television series about entrepreneurship

- Also known as: StarTop Albania
- Genre: Reality television
- Created by: Ledja Liku
- Screenplay by: Ardi Pulaj
- Presented by: Eno Popi
- Judges: Shkëlzen Marku; Edona Bilali; Shkamb Koshi; Orgesa Kalemi; Antonela Hako; Arbi Mazniku; Amarda Toska; Rafaela Rica; Patrik Fetahu
- Country of origin: Albania
- Original language: Albanian
- No. of seasons: 1
- No. of episodes: 12

Production
- Executive producer: Ledja Liku
- Production locations: Tirana, Albania
- Editor: Silvana Babaramo
- Camera setup: Multi-camera

Original release
- Network: Top Channel
- Release: 22 October 2022 – 7 January 2023

Startop is an Albanian reality television series focused on business and entrepreneurship. It aired on the Albanian television network Top Channel from October 22, 2022, to January 7, 2023, and consisted of 12 episodes.

== Format ==
Startop featured participants presenting business ideas to a panel of invited professionals from various sectors. Each episode included several presentations followed by feedback from the panel. The show’s title combines "start-up" and "Top Channel", indicating its thematic focus on new business ventures.

== Expert Panel ==
The panel included business professionals and public figures who commented on the ideas presented and discussed possible improvements or challenges. Panel members came from fields such as finance, media, government, and enterprise development.

== Production ==
The project was created and executive produced by Ledja Liku. The script was written by Ardi Pulaj, and the series was hosted by Eno Popi, a well-known Albanian television presenter.

== Collaboration ==
The series was developed in collaboration with the Dritan Hoxha Media Foundation and supported by the Ministry of State for Entrepreneurship and Business Climate of Albania, which contributed financial resources to assist selected projects.

== Episodes ==
The first season included 12 episodes, each presenting a new set of participants and business ideas.
