= Për'puthen =

Albanian dating reality TV series

- Logo as of season 3
- Genre: Reality
- Created by: Olsa Muhameti
- Directed by: Erion Hasanllari
- Presented by: Nevina Shtylla (2019–2020); Bora Zemani (2020–2023); Ori Nebijaj (2022); Megi Pojani (2023–2026); Heidi Baci (2026-)
- Country of origin: Albania
- Original language: Albanian
- No. of seasons: 5
- No. of episodes: 500+

Production
- Running time: 45–60 minutes
- Production company: Top Channel

Original release
- Network: Top Channel
- Release: 22 September 2019 – present

Related
- Për'puthen Prime; Për'puthen +40

Për'puthen (Note: transl. [They] Match; a pun on "puthen" which is a form of the verb puth (kiss) used in the context of something like "Ata puthen" ("They kiss").) is an Albanian dating game show that premiered on 22 September 2019 on Top Channel. The series is created by Olsa Muhameti, directed by Erion Hasanllari, and currently presented by Heidi Baci; with the participation of Drini Zeqo and Erjola Doci as the show's opinionists. The first season aired only on Sundays, but due to its success, the show expanded to five days a week, from Monday to Friday, starting in its second season.

== Format ==
The main purpose of Për'puthen is for people to find their significant other. The female contestants are the ones who have to weekly choose one of the men so they can have a date and get to know each other better. The male contestants have the right to accept or decline their invitations. Every day, pre-recorded dates are shown in the studio and discussed between the contestants, the host, and the analyst, often leading to dynamic debates. It is forbidden for contestants to meet up outside of Top Channel studios, or even talk to one another on the phone. When couples develop feelings and want to get into relationships with each other, they leave the program as matched (të përputhur).

== Series overview ==
Series	Presenter	Opinionist	Episodes	Originally released	
Series	Presenter	Opinionist	Episodes	First released	Last released
1	Nevina Shtylla	Olti Curri	43	22 September 2019	11 July 2020
2	Bora Zemani	Arjan Konomi	190	8 September 2020	27 May 2021
3	Bora Zemani	Arjan Konomi	250	6 September 2021	10 June 2022
4	Ori Nebijaj	Neda Balluku	198	12 September 2022	10 June 2023
5	Megi Pojani	Alona Musta	TBA	18 September 2023	2024

== Contestants ==
=== Season 2 ===
==== Females ====
Name	Age on entry	Hometown
Shqipe Hysenaj	28	Bellinzona
Tea Trifoni	21	Lushnjë
Diana "Ana" Lleshi	25	Sarandë
Fjorela Peto	21	Fier
Anilda "Ana" Kauri	26	Berat
Sindi Loci	22	Tirana
Melisa Lleshi	23	Laç
Ledjana Prenga	23	Rrëshen
Antonela Berishaj	24	Shkodër
Jasmin Kadriu	23	Dibër
Sara Malaj	22	Athens
Aristela Leka	27	Laç
Gladiola Zenelaj	22	Fier

==== Males ====
Name	Age on entry	Hometown
Armando "Andi" Shehi	24	Tirana
Fation Kuqari	26	Fier
Emin Kelmendi	31	Pristina
Mevlan Shaba	33	Kavajë
Renato Dragoti	23	Gramsh
Andreas Nuraj	--	Preveza
Nikolin Lleshi	--	Milot
Arbër Aruçi	25	Maminas
Irgent Çollaku	24	Durrës
Erjon Geca	28	Tirana
Armand Ferati	26	Kamëz
Maris Lika	23	Tirana
Klejdi Jazaj	24	Tirana
Graciano Merkaj	23	Tirana
Berat Behramaj	26	Skenderaj
Elvis Lushi	26	Mirditë
Beart Rexhepi	26	Pristina
Rogert Bidaj	27	Fier
Arjon Luli	26	Puka
Blerim Fejza	28	Tirana
Erlind Kapllani	23	Mallakastër
Almend Kreku	33	Berat
Panajot Karasani	23	Dibër
Atdhe Xharavina	27	Gjakova
Murat Jygje	23	Istanbul
Edison Ramhoxha	33	Tirana
Kristian Marcinaj	27	Crete
Andi Artani	24	Brooklyn
Eris Aga	25	Tirana
Rinian Leka	33	Rrëshen
Juljan Lala	28	Borsh
Ervis Kurti	31	Dibër
Arsim Abduli	28	Olten
Dorian Kuka	29	Lushnjë
Princ Mile	23	Fier
Blerim Dauti	31	Kumanovo
Alessandro Mehmeti	23	San Benedetto del Tronto
Sajmir Neziri	26	Tirana
Elton Maksuti	26	Kavajë
Shkëlqim Bega	25	Krujë
Ledjan Bregasi	27	Italy
Geljan Rajku	21	Durrës
Ani Xhafaj	24	Mallakastër
Anxhelo Mullaj	28	Divjakë

=== Season 4 ===
==== Females ====
Name	Age on entry	Hometown
Anxhela	24	Athens
Eda Likaj	22	Fier
Orsiola Lici	19	Elbasan
Ilda Mehmetaj	25	Vlorë
Kamila Stafa	26	Shijak
Laura Dervishi	28	Italy
Lorida Dani	25	Berat
Xheni Brahaj	--	--

== Reception ==
Për'puthen is one of the most watched Balkan shows of the recent years. In November 2020, for a total of 60 episodes of the second season only, Për'puthen gained over 100 million views on YouTube. The show continued to grow in popularity and it eventually reached a total of 500 million views for the whole second season, days prior to its finale in May 2021.

Host Bora Zemani was criticized by Për'puthen participants many times, for cold and rude behaviour towards them. Zemani was also criticized by fans for creating unnecessary debates between the Perputhen participants and also for telling Ledjana Prenga to leave the studio.

== Spin-off shows ==
=== Për'puthen Prime ===
A continuation of the daily Për'puthen, with more exclusive topics and special guests. Për'puthen Prime was broadcast on Sundays at a duration of 2 hours and began on 3 January 2021 and ended with the last episode on 7 March 2021.

In the third season, the spin-off show was broadcast from 2 October 2021 until 23 April 2022. This season was broadcast every Saturday.

The fourth season will begin airing on 8 January 2023, every Sunday on Top Channel.

=== Për'puthen +40 ===
A spin-off of the regular Për'puthen for people over 40 years old. The first contestants were introduced in the finale of Për'puthen Prime on 7 March 2021. Për'puthen +40 started broadcasting on 13 March 2021.
