= Faton Macula =

Kosovo-born Albanian jazz guitarist (born 1980)

- Born: January 1, 1980 (age 46); Mitrovica, Kosovo
- Origin: Republic of Kosovo
- Genres: Jazz
- Occupation: Guitarist
- Instrument: Guitar
- Years active: 1996–present
- Label: Musik Garden
- Website: www.fatonmacula.com

Faton Macula is a Kosovo-born Albanian Jazz guitarist. Faton currently lives in New York City.

== Biography ==
Faton Macula was born on January 1, 1980, Mitrovica, Kosovo. His first guitar was given to him by his father at the age of 8. His father was the main person that brought him into jazz. His parents after noticing his interest in the guitar, arranged for him to study in a classical music school in Mitrovica with the teacher Petar Rakic. And while studying he also played with various rock bands from all over Kosovo. By the age of 15, his teacher showed him some records of George Benson and Joe Pass which Faton really liked. From that moment his musical direction was given. Two years later he enrolled at the "Hochschule für Musik & Darstellende Kunst"in Graz, Austria.

As of 2012, Faton is married to Claudia Cruz and they have a daughter called Iman.

== Career ==
=== 1990's ===
Faton has had the opportunity to study and to play with musicians such as Harry Pepl, Wayne Brasel, Ewald Oberleitner, Stjepko Gut, Dusko Goikivic, Mark Murphy, Sheila Jordan, Jay Clayton and Bill Dobbins. Each one of these musicians helped him in his learning process of the necessary vocabulary of jazz guitar and music in its general aspects.

In 1998, at age 19, he recorded his first Jazz album under the record label "Musik Garden" called I remember you in Graz, Austria.

=== 2000-present ===
In the year 2000 he returned to Pristina, Kosovo, where he recorded and released his pop album Telat (English: strings). The eponymous single of the album went on to become a #1 Hit in Kosovo.

In 2002 he was invited by his friend and mentor Mark Whitfield to New York City to continue to further expand his career. Together with Whitfield's help and Faton's hard work he had the opportunity to record and perform with Jazz and pop artists such as Marc Anthony, Shakira, Faith Hill, Missy Elliott, Carl Thomas, Gladys Knight, Mary J. Blige, James Genus, Gregory Hutchinson, Dave Kikoski, Donald Edwards, Mark Whitfield, Jim Pryor, Ravi Coltrane, Allan Harris and many more.

Faton continues to perform, record and teach guitar in New York City, and is about to release his third album titled "IMAN", a mix of jazz, R&B and Neo-Soul, which features new upcoming artists such as Father Dude, Kofi Black, Ja'Shayla, Shanelle Gabrielle, Sadiya Rock and Fritz Jerey, as well as a duet with Mark Whitfield.

== Discography ==
=== Albums ===
- I remember you (1998)
- Telat (2000)
- IMAN (2010)
