= TV Koha =

Albanian television channel

- Country: Albania
- Headquarters: Tirana

Programming
- Language: Albanian

Ownership
- Owner: Media 99 sh.a.

History
- Launched: 1998
- Founder: Nikollë Lesi

Availability

Terrestrial
- Analog: PAL UHF 50

TV Koha was an Albanian private television channel based in Tirana, active from 1998. The broadcaster was founded by the publishers of newspaper Koha Jonë and became known for its mix of news, talk shows, entertainment programming and foreign films.

== History ==
TV Koha was launched in 1998 as part of the expansion of the "Koha Jonë" media group. The station entered the market during a period of rapid growth in private broadcasting, following the end of the state monopoly previously held by RTSH.

The channel initially operated as a general entertainment and information broadcaster. In its early years, TV Koha gained popularity for airing a large number of foreign films and television series, especially during evening programming. It also produced talk shows and current affairs programs aimed at Albanian audiences. Among its most-watched programs were Koha Juaj and Fokus, hosted by journalist Robert Papa.

In 2003, the television station was acquired by a group of businessmen who invested in upgrading its technical infrastructure and production quality. The broadcaster subsequently expanded its programming and increased its presence in the Albanian television market.

Several Albanian media personalities and producers worked at TV Koha during the early stages of their careers. Television producer Olsa Muhameti, later known for creating entertainment programs in Albania and Kosovo, previously worked as a journalist at the station.

TV Koha ceased operations in 2014 after more than fifteen years on air.
