= Ledjana Prenga =

Reality television participant

- Born: 19 December 1997 (age 28); Rrëshen, Lezhë, Albania
- Citizenship: Albania
- Education: University of Medicine, Tirana
- Known for: Për'puthen

Ledjana Prenga (born 19 December 1997) is an Albanian reality television contestant and media personality, known for debuting on Për'puthen, an Albanian dating reality television series that premiered on September 22, 2019, on Top Channel.

== Life and career ==
Ledjana was born in the small town of Rrëshen, Albania. She studied Dentistry at the University of Medicine, Tirana, in the Faculty of Dental Medicine. While still studying at the university, Ledjana decided to participate on the reality show Për'puthen on Top Channel, starting from January 1, 2021.
