= Bora Zemani =

Albanian television presenter and actress (born 1992)

- Born: Borana Zemani; 9 January 1992 (age 34); Vlorë, Albania
- Occupations: Television presenter; actress
- Years active: 2010–present
- Spouse: Vin Veli (m. 2014; div. 2017)
- Partner: Donald Veshaj (2019–present)
- Children: 1

Borana Asllan Zemani (born 9 January 1992) is an Albanian actress and former television presenter. She began her career as a showgirl dancer in Fiks Fare, and then continuing in children's TV shows before creating her big career on Top Channel from 2020 until 2026.

== Early life ==
Zemani was born in Vlorë, Albania. Her given name "Borana" is said to be inspired by the Albanian opera of the same name, which her mother attended at the National Theatre of Opera and Ballet shortly before her birth.

== Career ==
Zemani began her career in television as a model with her first appearance at satirical talk show Fiks Fare, before transitioning to television presenting. She has hosted several Albanian TV programs including:

- Treshat – a talk show on Vizion Plus alongside Romeo and Donald Veshaj
- Për'puthen – a dating show on Top Channel
- Dancing With The Stars Albania – dance competition on Top Channel
- Piramida - game show
- Për Shqiptarët

== Filmography ==
=== Films ===
- Ne – comedy (2015)
- Sex, Përrallë dhe Celular – comedy, as Gym girl (2015)
- 5 Times No – romance, as Jora (2023)

== Personal life ==
Zemani was previously married to DJ Vin Veli, with whom she has a son named Arbor. She is currently in a relationship with television presenter and visual artist Donald Veshaj. Their relationship was publicly confirmed during Veshaj's participation in the first season of Big Brother VIP Albania, when she surprised him with a visit.
