= Egla Ceno =

Albanian actress (born 1977)

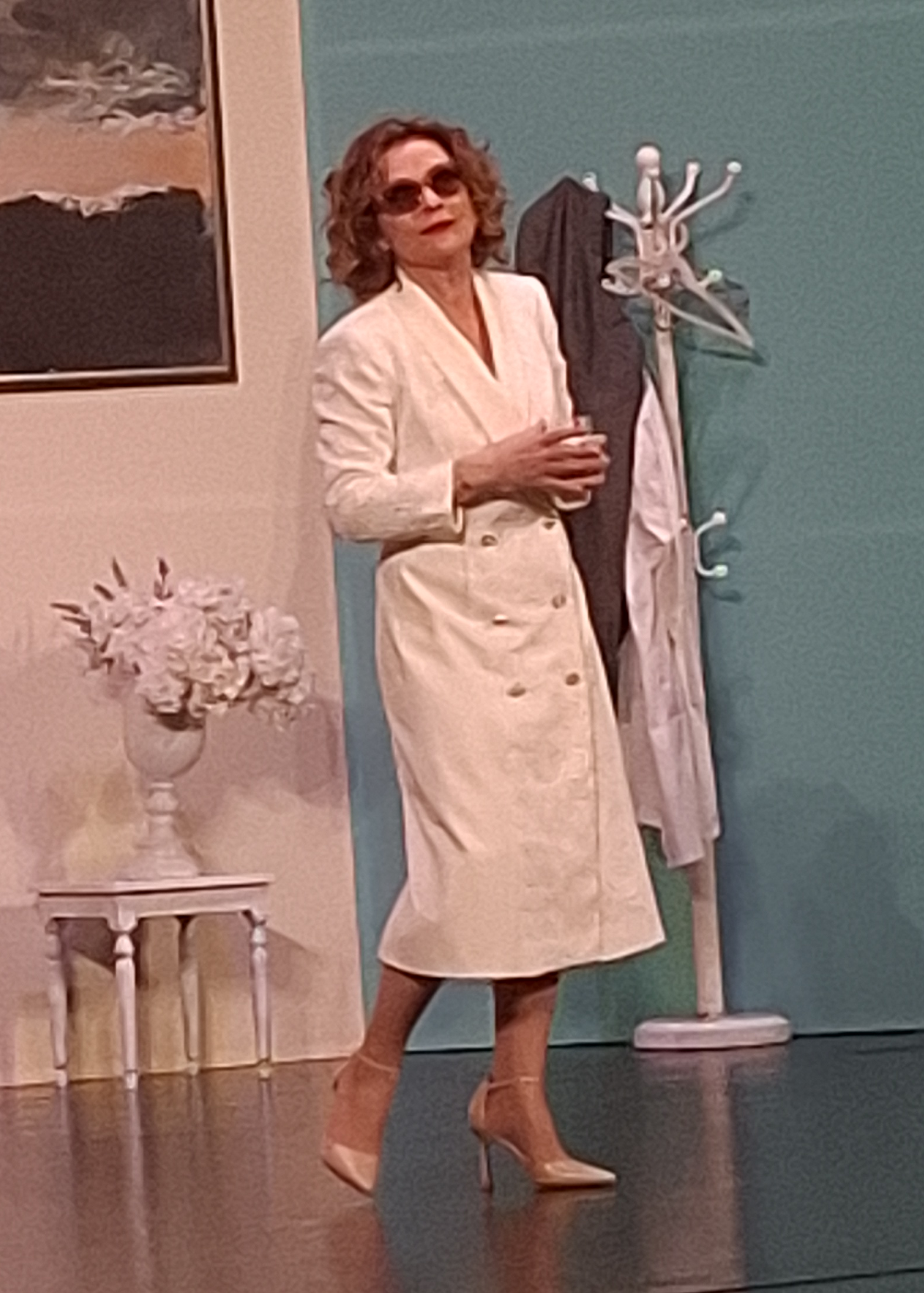
- Ceno in the theatrical play What the Butler Saw in 2025
- Born: Eglantina Ceno; 4 April 1977 (age 49); Berat, PSR Albania
- Education: Folkwang University of the Arts
- Occupations: Actress; Television presenter
- Known for: Big Brother VIP Albania 3 Goca dhe Gra

Egla Ceno (born Eglantina Ceno; 4 April 1977) is an Albanian actress and television presenter. She has worked in theatre, film, and television. Ceno was one of the presenters of the talk show Goca dhe Gra and was the winner of the third season of Big Brother VIP Albania.

== Early life and education ==
Ceno was born in Berat. She studied acting at the Academy of Fine Arts in Tirana and later continued her education at the Folkwang University of the Arts in Germany, where she focused on physical theatre.

== Career ==
After her studies, Ceno moved to Italy and lived there for 15 years. She worked in television production, including as an assistant director for the Italian series CentoVetrine.

In 2016, she appeared in the Albanian comedy series M'fal për shprehjen, created by Elvis Pupa. The show included elements of satire and social commentary.

Ceno later joined the cast of Portokalli, a comedy sketch show, where she played recurring characters such as Zimbile and a female driver. She also co-founded the private theatre company OAZ together with director Altin Basha and other collaborators.

In 2024, Ceno participated as a contestant on the third season of Big Brother VIP Albania and was declared the winner.

== Filmography ==
=== Film ===
- 100 Vitrinat Italy (2010)
- Sex, përrallë dhe celular (2015)
- No Country for Fairy Tales (2015)
- Hije (2016)
- Shtëpia e Agës (2019)
- 5 herë jo (2023)

=== Theatre ===
- Ars Longa, Vita Brevis (2001)
- Dashuri në furgon (2002)
- Shkër...ta me kapele (2014)
- Made in Albania (2016)
- Macbeth (2018)
- Night (2018–2019)
- Father Sergius (2018)
- Udha e Qumështit (2019)
- Zyrtarisht beqare (2019)
- Një Madam nga Argjentina (2021)
