= Big Brother VIP Albania =

Albanian reality competition and TV series

- Season 3 logo
- Genre: Reality competition
- Based on: Big Brother by John de Mol Jr.
- Developed by: John de Mol
- Directed by: Eduart Grishaj (2021–2023); Ergys Lubonja (2024–)
- Presented by: Arbana Osmani (2021-2023); Ledion Liço (2023-)
- Country of origin: Albania
- Original language: Albanian
- No. of seasons: 5
- No. of episodes: 585

Production
- Executive producer: Eva Marku (2025–)
- Producers: Sara Hoxha; Lori Hoxha (2021–2024)
- Production locations: Mëzez, Kashar, Tirana, Albania
- Camera setup: Multi-camera
- Production company: Top Channel

Original release
- Network: Top Channel
- Release: 5 October 2021 – present

Related
- Big Brother Albania; Big Brother VIP – Fans' Club

Big Brother VIP, also known as Big Brother VIP Albania, is a reality show of the Albanian adaptation of Big Brother Albania, both based on the Dutch reality competition franchise Big Brother and created by producer John de Mol Jr.. The Albanian edition of Big Brother VIP, it began airing on 5 October 2021 on Top Channel. The series follows a number of celebrity contestants, known as housemates, who are isolated from the outside world for an extended period of time in a custom built house. Each week, one of the housemates is evicted by a public vote, with the last housemate remaining winning a cash prize of €100,000.

The programme was initially presented by Arbana Osmani for the first two seasons. Osmani declined to return as presenter on the third season, and the role was taken up by Ledion Liço.

Unlike the original version, the live shows or live eviction shows were seen every Tuesday and Friday (season 1) or every Tuesday and Saturday (since season 2) on Top Channel. Also in the same channel, from Monday to Saturday on afternoon was seen the daily summary, for one hour. Like the original version, every Sunday was covered in a spin-off series with the name Big Brother VIP – Fans' Club. After the final of each season, was broadcast the reunion show, Post Big Brother VIP. Since season 2, was introduced the Big Brother radio show, with the name Big Brother Radio and was broadcast on Top Albania Radio and on My Music. The viewers can watch for the whole season live from the house in two live pay-per-view channels, with the name Big Brother VIP 1 and Big Brother VIP 2, which are available on Albanian TV platform DigitAlb.

Due to satisfactory ratings of the first season, Top Channel announced a second season of Big Brother VIP, which began on 24 December 2022. The show was renewed for a third season in May 2023 and began airing on 13 January 2024 on Top Channel. On 16 June 2024, Top Channel renewed the show for a fourth season. On 15 November 2025 was announced the fifth season.

== History ==
In September 2017, it was rumored that Top Channel had decided to start the celebrity version after the success of the original version. The celebrity version of the show was expected to start during the 2017–2018 television season. The show was confirmed for its first season in early January 2018 with a trailer along with the renewals of The Voice Kids. The first trailer of the show premiered on 29 January 2018 and read "...It's hard, being a VIP! They deserve to relax! And where is the VIP resort?! Big Brother Vip ... coming soon only on Top Channel." In 2019, Top Channel announced that Big Brother would come back for the 2019–2020 television season in Albania, but they didn't say if will be an original or a celebrity version.

However, plans for production were never officially released until 2021, where on 17 May 2021, Top Channel announced that the season would air later in the year, after a four-year hiatus from the original version. They also announced that applications were open to all Albanian celebrities. On 12 August 2021, Top Channel confirmed that the season would air in October 2021. Top Channel released in August 2021, a trailer and read "We have been told that you miss him." and at the end of the trailer we hear Arbana Osmani telling "Returns soon on Top Channel.". On 30 September 2021, Top Channel announced that the show will begin airing on 5 October 2021. The show was originally scheduled to last 100 days, with the finale on 11 January 2022. However, due to satisfactory ratings, the show was extended by over one month, making it 137 days long and with the finale on 18 February 2022.

Due to satisfactory ratings of the first season, it was announced a second season of Big Brother VIP, by the executive producers, Lori Hoxha and Sara Hoxha. On 24 December 2022, the second season began airing. On 25 March 2023, Arbana Osmani announced that the show was originally scheduled to last 100 days, with the finale on 1 April 2023. However, due to satisfactory ratings, the show was extended by over one month, making it 134 days long and with the finale on 6 May 2023.

In May 2023, the executive producer, Sara Hoxha announced on her Instagram account, that the third season of the show will begin on Top Channel. On 30 November 2023, it was announced that the show will return, with the third season, in 2024. One day later, Top Channel aired a teaser trailer during the ninth episode of the ninth season of Dancing with the Stars, officially confirming that the series would return for a new season in January 2024 on Top Channel. On 29 December 2023, Top Channel released a thirty seconds teaser featuring some eyes and read "Everyone Housemates except for one" and then features, the new host Ledion Liço, who says "And these others, who are they?" and at the end we hear "Find out from 13 January only on Top Channel". On 9 January 2024, it was announced that the new Director will be Ergys Lubonja.

In June 2024, the host of the show, Ledion Liço was asked in his interview for the show Top Arena on Top Channel, when will Big Brother VIP 4 start and Liço answered "We will wait a little longer". In August 2024, the executive producer, Sara Hoxha has shared her morning coffee on social networks, where it is written "Big Brother VIP 4 is coming". In October 2024, on Instagram were posted the designs from the new house. On 22 October 2024, it was announced that the fourth season will begin airing in December 2024. On 14 November 2025 Top Channel released a promotional video for the fifth season announcing that is scheduled to premiere in December 2025.

== Format ==
Big Brother VIP is a game show in which a group of celebrity contestants, referred to as housemates, live in isolation from the outside world in a custom built "house", constantly under video surveillance. Access to television, the Internet, print media, and time is prohibited. In addition, the housemates live in complete confinement; they have no access to the outside world. Sometimes the viewers votes for their favorite housemates, and the housemates with the most votes had immunity. Also sometimes the housemates votes for their favorite housemate of house, and the housemate with the most votes had immunity. At least once a week, the housemates secretly nominate two housemates they wish to face a public vote to evict. The two or more housemates with the most votes face the public vote. The viewing public decides which of them gets evicted through text message votes or phone calls. The nominee with the most votes is evicted and leaves the house. Should their stay inside the house become difficult for them to bear, a housemate is allowed to voluntarily leave at any time during the game. In the event of a withdrawal from the house, a replacement housemate usually enters in their place. In the final week of each season, the viewers vote for which of the remaining people in the house should win the prize money of €100,000 and be crowned the winner of Big Brother VIP.

During their time in the house, housemates are given weekly tasks to perform. The housemates wager a portion of their weekly shopping budget on the task, and either win double their wagered fund or lose the wagered fund depending on their performance in the task. The housemates are required to work as a group to complete their tasks, with the format of the tasks varying based on the number of remaining housemates. The housemates are forbidden from discussing nominations, and doing so could result in punishment. The format of the series is mainly seen as a social experiment, and requires housemates to interact with others who may have differing ideals, beliefs, and prejudices. Housemates are also required to make visits to the diary room during their stay in the house, where they are able to share their thoughts and feelings on their fellow housemates and the game.

A new twist to change the format of the game was featured, this was the Pandora's Box. The twist sees a housemate being tempted by the box, and can choose to either open the box or leave it. Should a Housemate choose to open Pandora's Box, both good and bad consequences could be unleashed into the house, which impacts every Housemate in-game including the person who opens it. Another twist was the Power of Veto, like in the American format, a housemate can win the Power of Veto. The winner of the Veto competition wins the right to either revoke the nomination of one of the nominated housemates or leave them as is.

== Cast ==
Several presenters were rumored to be hosting the show once Top Channel announced the show. Arbana Osmani, who also has hosted the original version, was rumored to be the host of the show. The host of the eighth season of the original version Ledion Liço, was also rumored to be the host. Another host from Top Channel was rumored as the host of the show, Luana Vjollca. On 17 August 2021, Arbana Osmani announced on her Instagram account that she will be the presenter of the show. It was rumored that maybe Osmani will not be the presenter for the third season. Later, it was rumored that Bora Zemani, who hosts also on Top Channel the show Dancing with the Stars, will be hosting the third season of Big Brother VIP. It was also rumored that Ledion Liço will host the season. In November 2023, Osmani on her social network Instagram has posted a photo as she is seen in the premises of Top Channel getting ready, but it was not announced if she will host the third season. On 29 December 2023, Top Channel announced that the host of the third season will be Ledion Liço. On 17 November 2024, was announced that Ledion Liço would return for the fourth season, as host. On 15 November 2025, was announced that the host for the fifth season would be for the third time Ledion Liço.

Like in the original version, also in the celebrity version would have two Opinionists in the live shows. On 4 October 2021, it was announced that Arbër Hajdari and Balina Bodinaku would be the two Opinionists. Before the premiere of the second season, it was announced that Arbër Hajdari would be return as the opinionist. During the launch show, of the second season, it was announced that Zhaklin Lekatari would be the new opinionist. On 8 January 2023, Top Channel announced that Hajdari will be returning for his third season as an opinionist. It was also announced that the new opinionist will be Ori Nebijaj. On 6 December 2024, Top Channel announced that Big Brother 4 housemate Neda Balluku would be the new opinionist, with Hajdari returning for his fourth season as opinionist. On 20 December 2025 was announced that Monika Kryemadhi would be the new opinionist, with Hajdari returning for his fifth season as opinionist.

Big Brother VIP Cast
Person	Season				
Person	1	2	3	4	5
Host
Arbana Osmani					
Ledion Liço					
Opinionist
Arbër Hajdari					
Balina Bodinaku					
Zhaklin Lekatari					
Ori Nebijaj					
Neda Balluku					
Monika Kryemadhi					

== Location ==
The house of Big Brother is always one of the most discussed topics in Albania before the according season starts. In the original version, the location of the house was always in different locations, like Gërdec and Kashar.

Like in the original version, the housemates live together in the house, where 24 hours a day their every word and every action is recorded by cameras and microphones in all the rooms in the house. For the celebrity version, Top Channel made a new big studio in Tirana with the name Studio Nova for their prime time shows, like Hell's Kitchen Albania, Shiko Kush Luan and other big shows. The house for the Big Brother VIP will also be built there. There is also an auditorium where the live audience shows, such as the eviction and finale episodes, were staged.

== Series overview ==
Season	Episodes	Originally released			Days	Housemates	Winner	Runner(s)-up	Prize money
Season	Episodes	First released	Last released	Network	Days	Housemates	Winner	Runner(s)-up	Prize money
1	157	5 October 2021	18 February 2022	Top Channel	137	30	Ilir Shaqiri	Donald Veshaj	€100,000
2	148	24 December 2022	6 May 2023	Top Channel	134	37	Luiz Ejlli	Krist Aliaj Dragot	€100,000
3	152	13 January 2024	25 May 2024	Top Channel	134	36	Egla Ceno	Julian Deda	€100,000
4	127	21 December 2024	19 April 2025	Top Channel	120	38	Besart "Gjesti" Kelmendi	Rozana Radi	€100,000
5	127	20 December 2025	18 April 2026	Top Channel	120	39	Selin Bollati	Miri Shahini	€100,000
6	TBA	December 2026	TBA	Top Channel	TBA	TBA	TBA	TBA	TBA

== Companion show ==
=== Big Brother VIP – Fans' Club ===
In the original version of Big Brother, was broadcast a spin-off show with the name Big Brother – Fans' Club and also in the celebrity version this show was broadcast with the name Big Brother VIP – Fans' Club. The show premiered on 17 October 2021 and broadcast every Sunday at 12:15 pm, with Dojna Mema as the presenter and Iva Tiço as the opinionist. The show features debates and conversations about the latest goings inside and outside the house with a studio audience and celebrity panel, and with the first eliminated housemate who are usually invited to the studio after leaving. Megi Pojani replaced Mema as the new Fans' Club presenter for season 2 and Ardit Cuni was the new opionist. On the third season, Enxhi Nasufi was the presenter and the two opinionists were Big Brother VIP season 2 housemate Ronaldo Sharka and Ina Kollçaku. Big Brother VIP season 3 finalist Heidi Baci, was announced as the presenter for the fourth season and the two oponionists were once again Ronaldo Sharka and Big Brother VIP Kosova 2 finalist Shqipe Hysenaj. The presenter for the fifth season was Big brother VIP season 2 housemate Kiara Tito and the opinionists were Arjan Konomi and Big Brother VIP season 3 housemate Françeska Murati.

Series	Episodes	Originally released			Big Brother VIP season
Series	Episodes	First released	Last released	Network	Big Brother VIP season
1	19	17 October 2021	15 February 2022	Top Channel	1
2	18	8 January 2023	2 May 2023	Top Channel	2
3	18	21 January 2024	19 May 2024	Top Channel	3
4	15	5 January 2025	15 April 2025	Top Channel	4
5	17	21 December 2025	14 April 2026	Top Channel	5

=== Post Big Brother VIP ===
Like in the original version, one week after the final of the show, was broadcast a reunion show, with the name Post Big Brother VIP, where the housemates will gather all together to discuss what happened inside the house. In the original version the show was broadcast only for one episode, but in the celebrity version the show was broadcast for three episodes (season 1), for two episodes (season 2–3) or for one episode (season 4). The show was hosted by Arbana Osmani, for the first two seasons, and since season three, the host is Ledion Liço. The two opinionists for season one were Arbër Hajdari and Balina Bodinaku. In season two, Hajdari was joined by Zhaklin Lekatari and in the third season, Hajdari was joined by Ori Nebijaj. For the fourth season, the opinionists were Arbër Hajdari and Neda Balluku. For the fifth season, the opinionists were Arbër Hajdari and Monika Kryemadhi.

Series	Episodes	Originally released			Big Brother VIP season
Series	Episodes	First released	Last released	Network	Big Brother VIP season
1	3	22 February 2022	1 March 2022	Top Channel	1
2	2	13 May 2023	20 May 2023	Top Channel	2
3	2	28 May 2024	1 June 2024	Top Channel	3
4	2	26 April 2025	3 May 2025	Top Channel	4
5	2	21 April 2026	25 April 2026	Top Channel	5

=== Big Brother Radio ===
Big Brother Radio was introduced on the second season of Big Brother VIP as the Big Brother radio show. The show was hosted by Elona Duro. In the second season, Duro returded as the host and Eni Shehu and Albana Ruçi were joined as the new hosts. On the third season the hosts were Elona Duro, who presented the show every Monday, Wednesday and Thursday, and Atalanta Kërçyku, who presented the show every Tuesday and Friday. The show premiered on 13 February 2023 and was broadcast from Mondays to Thursdays and on Saturdays on Top Albania Radio and on My Music. The second season premiered on 15 January 2024 and was broadcast every day from Mondays to Sundays. The third season was broadcast from Mondays to Fridays. On the show often featured interviews from past housemates and the latest evictee as well as calls from fans. The fourth season was also broadcast from Mondays to Fridays.

Series	Episodes	Originally released			Big Brother VIP season
Series	Episodes	First released	Last released	Network	Big Brother VIP season
1	58	13 February 2023	4 May 2023	Top Albania Radio; My Music	2
2	131	15 January 2024	24 May 2024	Top Albania Radio; My Music	3
3	85	23 December 2024	18 April 2025	Top Albania Radio; My Music	4
4	85	22 December 2025	17 April 2026	Top Albania Radio; My Music	5

== Reception ==
Big Brother Albania is known as the most popular Reality television show in Albania. Big Brother VIP also became very popular, few weeks after its premiere. This was reflected on the price businesses had to pay to promote their activity. So, in 2021–2022 television season, Big Brother VIP became the most expensive show to advertise. Thus, one second before the reality show starts broadcasting costs 5700 lek, and during the broadcast, 11,000 ALL.

The third among the most expensive are again two shows related to Big Brother VIP; the first is Big Brother VIP Daily Summary and the second Big Brother VIP – Fans' Club, where every second during the broadcast is paid 4600 ALL.

The finale broke the records, making it the most watched programme in the Albanian TV history. On the night of 18 February, the grand finale's night, the roads in Albania were empty and few days ago, people reserved to watch it out in the city's bars.

Eduart Grishaj, the show's director also said that the votes for the winner, were out of any prediction and broke records.

On the opening of finale's show there was shown a video with some stats as following:

- 525,433.875 views on YouTube
- 1,798,169,951 views on Instagram
- 381.717 Instagram followers

Albania's prime minister, Edi Rama, posted a video from Valbona with Fifi's song "Diell", which was composed inside the Big Brother VIP's house. This song became the most popular at the month of publishing.

Big Brother VIP and Donald Veshaj were among the most searched words on Google for year 2021.

As of 20 July 2022, the video where Donald Veshaj meets and kisses Bora Zemani, counts up to 2,600,000 views on YouTube.

The video where Donald Veshaj kisses singer Beatrix Ramosaj, counts up to 1,500,000 views.

Singer Beatrix Ramosaj was surprised and sent to watch her brother, singer Alban Ramosaj perform in "Festivali i Këngës", the episode reached 1,300,000 views on YouTube, and was considered the best and most emotional surprise in the first edition of Big Brother VIP Albania by fans.

Also, the episode where Fifi faints during the live show counts up to 1,350,000 views.

The official music video of "Me ty", the first known song to be written and recorded inside the "house" of Big Brother VIP, received a million views on YouTube, 9 hours after its upload.

== Trivia ==
- Season 1
  - Monika Lubonja & Arjola Demiri were the first players in any Big Brother series around the world to refuse to open Pandora's box, a game of choice used in many other Big Brother formats.
  - Einxhel Shkira breaks the record as the player that has received the most nominations (19) in the history of Big Brother.
