= Big Brother VIP (Albanian TV series) season 5 =

Big Brother VIP
- Season 5
- Hosted by: Ledion Liço
- No. of days: 120
- No. of housemates: 39
- Winner: Selin Bollati
- Runner-up: Miri Shahini
- Companion shows: Big Brother VIP – Fans' Club; Post Big Brother VIP
- No. of episodes: 127

Release
- Original network: Top Channel
- Original release: 20 December 2025 – 18 April 2026

Season chronology
- ← Previous; Season 4

Big Brother VIP 5, was the fifth season of Big Brother VIP, hosted by Ledion Liço. The season began airing on 20 December 2025 on Top Channel and ended after 120 days on 18 April 2026. The whole season, live from the house, was viewed in two live pay-per-view channels, with the name Big Brother VIP 1 and Big Brother VIP 2, which are available on Albanian television platform DigitAlb. Arbër Hajdari returned as opinionist and was joined by Monika Kryemadhi replacing Neda Balluku. In the eighth live show, Alketa Vejsiu replaced Arbër Hajdari who was temporarily away.

The spin-off show Big Brother VIP – Fans' Club was hosted this season, by season 2 housemate Kiara Tito. The two opinionists were Arjan Konomi and season 3 housemate Françeska Murati. One week after the final of the show, was broadcast a reunion show, with the name Post Big Brother VIP. The two episodes were broadcast on 21 April and 25 April 2026. The show was hosted by Ledion Liço, and the two opinionists were Arbër Hajdari and Monika Kryemadhi.

== Production ==
After the final of the fourth season of Big Brother VIP, host Ledion Liço announced that a fifth season would follow. According to the rumors, host Ledion Liço and executive producer Sara Hoxha have ended their relationship, and Liço is not expected to return as host for Big Brother VIP 5. Liço posted on his Instagram story, "Winter is coming…," sparking rumors that he might return as host for the fifth season of Big Brother VIP. Ledion Liço will return as the host of the fifth season. This was confirmed at the conclusion of a promotional video released by Top Channel, effectively ending speculation about who would host the new season.

On 14 November 2025, Top Channel released a promotional video for Big Brother VIP 5, featuring the new Big Brother VIP eye logo and announcing that the season is scheduled to premiere in December 2025.

== Housemates ==
Celebrity	Age on entry	Notability	Day entered	Day exited	Status
Selin Bollati	23	Dancer , TV Host	1	120	Winner
Armir "Miri" Shahini	46	Singer	1	120	Runner-up
Mateo Borri	28	Personal Trainer , Reality TV Star	15	120	3rd Place
Rogert Sterkaj	39	Journalist	32	120	4th Place
Brikena Selmani	25	Miss	1	113	Evicted
Shëndrit Lumi	31	Journalist	53	113	Evicted
Edisa Demollari	35	Model	71	109	Evicted
Juela Nikolli	31	Singer	4	109	Evicted
Mal Retkoceri	28	Singer	1	103	Evicted
Nikol Projko	23	Model	71	99	Evicted
Stenaldo Mëhilli	28	Journalist	4	95	Evicted
Artan Kola	54	Singer	25	92	Evicted
Gëzim "DJ Gimbo" Blakaj	25	DJ	36	88	Evicted
Greta Kazazi	24	Model	15	85	Ejected
Egi Gjyzeli	35	Personal Trainer	71	81	Evicted
Ardit Murataj	28	Journalist	53	78	Evicted
Alessio Aliaj	49	Model	50	74	Walked
Marko Luca	25	Singer	50	71	Evicted
Livia Lozi	25	Actress	53	67	Evicted
Kristi Lamaj	27	Singer	1	63	Ejected
Ina Aderi	26	Reality TV Star	22	60	Evicted
Gordana "Baby G" Kingji	29	Singer	36	57	Evicted
Krusita Stafa	26	Singer	32	53	Evicted
Stelina Kurila	25	Reality TV Star	15	46	Evicted
Angelo Haruni	31	TV Host	1	43	Evicted
Keijsi Hyseni	27	Reality TV Star	11	39	Ejected
Lorna Hysa	33	Singer	1	36	Evicted
Aleksandra Qirjazi	39	Make-Up Artist	25	32	Evicted
Erik Lloshi	36	Singer	18	32	Evicted
Flori Prini	33	Social Media Personality	18	29	Walked
Ilir Vrenozi	54	Social Media Personality	1	26	Walked
Lorela "Lore" Karoshi	30	Singer	1	25	Evicted
Juxhin Plovishti	27	Actor	4	22	Evicted
Ernest "Stine" Duka	44	Singer	1	22	Walked
Armir Tola	39	Building Engineer	1	18	Evicted
Seno Fishta	33	Podcaster	1	15	Evicted
Armela Hyseni	30	Reality TV Star	4	15	Evicted
Sabina Mete	29	Journalist	1	11	Evicted
Xhodi Skura	25	Actress	1	8	Evicted

== Nominations table ==
Key
2-in-1 housemate called 'Ina & Stelina', their nominations counted as one. (Week 3 - 4)

	Week 1		Week 2			Week 3		Week 4		Week 5			Week 6		Week 7			Week 8			Week 9		Week 10		Week 11		Week 12		Week 13		Week 14		Week 15		Week 16		Week 17 Final	
	Day 4	Day 8	Day 11	Day 15		Day 18	Day 22	Day 25	Day 29	Day 32		Day 36	Day 39	Day 43	Day 46		Day 50	Day 53	Day 57		Day 60	Day 64	Day 67	Day 71	Day 74	Day 78	Day 81	Day 85	Day 88	Day 92	Day 95	Day 99	Day 103	Day 106	Day 109		Week 17 Final	
Viewers’ favorite	none	Brikena, Ilir, Kristi, Miri, Stine	none					Kristi, Miri, Selin	none	Mateo		none									Mateo	none																
Viewers’ least favorite	none	Sabina	none					none	none	Aleksandra		none									none	none																
Selin	Nominated	Nominated	Exempt	No; Nominations	Nominated	Nominated	Keijsi, Lorna	Exempt	No; Nominations	Nominated	Nominated	Mateo, Artan	No; Nominations	Nominated	No; Nominations	Not eligible	No; Nominations	Exempt	Not eligible	Nominated	Mal, Livia	Nominated	Nominated	Not eligible	Juela, Miri	Egi, Brikena	Nominated		Nominated	No nominations	Nominated	No nominations	Nominated	Brikena	Exempt	Exempt	Winner (Day 120)	
Miri	No; Nominations	Nominated	Exempt	No; Nominations	Exempt	Nominated	Angelo, Greta	Exempt	No; Nominations	Nominated	Nominated	Rogert, Mal	Nominated	Nominated	No; Nominations	Not eligible	Nominated	Greta, Mal	Not eligible	Nominated	Mal, Selin	Nominated	No nominations	No nominations	Mal, Ardit	Mal, Egi	Brikena, Selin, Mateo, DJ Gimbo		Edisa	No nominations	Exempt	No nominations	No nominations	Rogert	Nominated	Nominated	Runner-up (Day 120)	
Mateo	Not in House			Exempt	Exempt	No; Nominations	Miri, Angelo	No; Nominations	Nominated	Nominated	Brikena	Miri, Angelo	Nominated	No; Nominations	No; Nominations	Not eligible	No; Nominations	Exempt	Not eligible	Nominated	Artan, Juela	Nominated	No nominations	Not eligible	Juela, Artan	Artan, Juela	Nominated		Shëndrit	Nominated	Nominated	No nominations	Not eligible	Brikena	No nominations	Nominated	Third place (Day 120)	
Rogert	Not in House									Exempt	Exempt	Greta, Angelo	Nominated	Nominated	No; Nominations	Nominated	Nominated	Greta, Baby G	Not eligible	Nominated	Mal, Artan	Nominated	Nominated	Not eligible	Ardit, Mal	Greta, Nikol	Exempt		Nominated	Mateo, Stenaldo	Nominated	No nominations	Not eligible	Miri	No nominations	Nominated	Fourth place (Day 120)	
Brikena	Exempt	Nominated	Exempt	No; Nominations	Exempt	No; Nominations	Miri, Kristi	No; Nominations	No; Nominations	Nominated	Juela	Rogert, Keijsi	No; Nominations	No; Nominations	No; Nominations	Not eligible	Nominated	Ina, Miri	Not eligible	Nominated	Miri, Livia	Nominated	No nominations	Not eligible	Miri, Greta	Miri, Edisa	Nominated		Mateo	No nominations	Nominated	No nominations	Brikena, Selin	Mateo	Nominated	Nominated	Evicted (Day 113)	
Shëndrit	Not in House																	DJ Gimbo	Not eligible	Nominated	Marko, Ardit	Nominated	No nominations	Not eligible	Artan, Ardit	Artan, Juela	No; Nominations		Mal	No nominations	Exempt	Edisa, Mal, Shëndrit	Not eligible	Selin	Miri	Nominated	Evicted (Day 113)	
Edisa	Not in House																							Exempt	Brikena, Mal	Nikol, Brikena	No; Nominations		Juela	No nominations	Nominated	Nominated	Not eligible	Miri	Brikena	Evicted (Day 109)		
Juela	Kristi	Nominated	Nominated	No; Nominations	Nominated	No; Nominations	Greta, Erik	No; Nominations	No; Nominations	Nominated	Stenaldo	Angelo, Krusita	No; Nominations	Exempt	No; Nominations	Not eligible	Nominated	Baby G, Ina	Not eligible	Nominated	Mal, Ardit	Nominated	Greta, Selin, DJ Gimbo	Not eligible	Ardit, Mal	Egi, Greta	No; Nominations		Brikena	No nominations	Nominated	No nominations	Not eligible	Rogert	Evicted (Day 109)			
Mal	No; Nominations	Nominated	Nominated	No; Nominations	Nominated	No; Nominations	Selin, Lore	No; Nominations	No; Nominations	Nominated	Artan	Rogert, Angelo	Nominated	No; Nominations	No; Nominations	Not eligible	No; Nominations	Miri, Juela	Not eligible	Nominated	Juela, Selin	Nominated	No nominations	Not eligible	Juela, Greta	Edisa, Artan	No; Nominations		Saved	No nominations	Nominated	Nominated	Evicted (Day 103)					
Nikol	Not in House																							Exempt	Juela, Artan	Artan, Edisa	Exempt		Nominated	No nominations	Nominated	Evicted (Day 99)						
Stenaldo	Exempt	Nominated	Nominated	No; Nominations	Nominated	No; Nominations	Keijsi, Lore	No; Nominations	No; Nominations	Nominated	Mal	Angelo, Ina	Nominated	No; Nominations	Nominated	Not eligible	Nominated	Greta, Marko	Not eligible	Nominated	Livia, Marko	Nominated	No nominations	Not eligible	Juela, Shëndrit	Greta, Shëndrit	No; Nominations		Nominated	Nominated	Evicted (Day 95)							
Artan	Not in House							Angelo, Ilir	No; Nominations	Nominated	Greta	Angelo, Miri	Nominated	Exempt	Nominated	Not eligible	No; Nominations	Miri, Baby G	Not eligible	Nominated	Miri, Stenaldo	Nominated	No nominations	Not eligible	Mal, Ardit	Nikol, Egi	No; Nominations		Nominated	Evicted (Day 92)								
DJ Gimbo	Not in House											Exempt	Nominated	Nominated	Nominated	Not eligible	No; Nominations	Exempt	Not eligible	Nominated	Juela, Marko	Nominated	Nominated	Not eligible	Artan, Juela	Artan, Juela	Nominated		Evicted (Day 88)									
Greta	Not in House			Exempt	Exempt	No; Nominations	Angelo, Juela	Nominated	No; Nominations	Nominated	Kristi	Rogert, Mal	No; Nominations	No; Nominations	Nominated	Not eligible	Nominated	Marko, Ina	Not eligible	Nominated	Miri, Juela	Nominated	Nominated	Nominated	Juela, Miri	Juela, Brikena	No; Nominations		Ejected (Day 85)									
Egi	Not in House																							Exempt	Juela, Artan	Juela, Edisa	Evicted (Day 81)											
Ardit	Not in House																	Selin	Not eligible	Nominated	Selin, Miri	Nominated	No nominations	Not eligible	Juela, Miri	Evicted (Day 78)												
Alessio	Not in House																Exempt	Ina, Kristi	Not eligible	Nominated	Marko, Miri	Nominated	No nominations	Not eligible	Walked (Day 74)													
Marko	Not in House																Exempt	Miri, Greta	Not eligible	Nominated	Mal, Selin	Nominated	No nominations	Nominated	Evicted (Day 71)													
Livia	Not in House																	Mateo	Not eligible	Nominated	Miri, Selin	Nominated	Evicted (Day 67)															
Kristi	Seno	Nominated	Exempt	Nominated	Exempt	No; Nominations	Brikena, Lore	Exempt	No; Nominations	Nominated	Angelo	Mal, Greta	Nominated	Exempt	No; Nominations	Not eligible	Nominated	Miri, Ina	Nominated	Nominated	Banned	Ejected (Day 63)																
Ina	Not in House						Keijsi, Selin	No; Nominations	Nominated	Nominated	Nominated	Angelo, Krusita	No; Nominations	Nominated	Nominated	Not eligible	No; Nominations	Greta, Baby G	Not eligible	Nominated	Evicted (Day 60)																	
Baby G	Not in House											Exempt	No; Nominations	No; Nominations	Nominated	Not eligible	No; Nominations	Juela, Artan	Evicted (Day 57)																			
Krusita	Not in House									Exempt	Exempt	Keijsi, Rogert	No; Nominations	No; Nominations	Nominated	Not eligible	Nominated	Evicted (Day 53)																				
Stelina	Not in House			Exempt	Exempt	No; Nominations	Keijsi, Selin	No; Nominations	No; Nominations	Nominated	Saved	Artan, Rogert	No; Nominations	No; Nominations	Nominated	Evicted (Day 46)																						
Angelo	Nominated	Nominated	Exempt	No; Nominations	Nominated	No; Nominations	Keijsi, Mateo	Nominated	No; Nominations	Nominated	Stelina	Juela, Mateo	Nominated	Evicted (Day 43)																								
Keijsi	Not in House		Exempt	Nominated	Nominated	No; Nominations	Angelo, Kristi	Nominated	Nominated	Nominated	Nominated	Mateo, Juela	Ejected (Day 39)																									
Lorna	Selin, Xhodi	Nominated	Nominated	No; Nominations	Nominated	No; Nominations	Lore, Stenaldo	No; Nominations	No; Nominations	Nominated	Nominated	Evicted (Day 36)																										
Aleksandra	Not in House							Keijsi, Greta	No; Nominations	Nominated	Evicted (Day 32)																											
Erik	Not in House					Exempt	Greta, Kristi	No; Nominations	Nominated	Evicted (Day 32)																												
Flori	Not in House					Exempt	Angelo, Kristi	No; Nominations	Walked (Day 29)																													
Ilir	Exempt	Nominated	Exempt	No; Nominations	Nominated	No; Nominations	Angelo, Kristi	Nominated	Walked (Day 26)																													
Lore	No; Nominations	Nominated	Nominated	No; Nominations	Nominated	No; Nominations	Kristi, Keijsi	Evicted (Day 25)																														
Juxhin	Exempt	Nominated	Exempt	No; Nominations	Nominated	Nominated	Evicted (Day 22)																															
Stine	No; Nominations	Nominated	Exempt	No; Nominations	Nominated	No; Nominations	Walked (Day 22)																															
Armir	No; Nominations	Nominated	Exempt	No; Nominations	Nominated	Evicted (Day 18)																																
Seno	Angelo	Nominated	Exempt	Nominated	Evicted (Day 15)																																	
Armela	Lorna	Nominated	Nominated	Evicted (Day 15)																																		
Sabina	No; Nominations	Nominated	Evicted (Day 11)																																			
Xhodi	Nominated	Evicted (Day 8)																																				
Notes	1	none	2, 3	4	5, 6	7	8, 9	10, 11, 12	13	14	15	16	17, 18	17, 19	20		17, 21	17, 22	23	none	17	24	17, 25	26, 27	17, 27, 28	17	29		17, 30	31	32	33	34	35	36	37	38	
Against public vote	Angelo, ~~Kristi~~, Lorna, ~~Selin~~, Seno, Xhodi	All housemates	Armela, Juela, Lore, Lorna, Mal, Stenaldo	Keijsi, Kristi, Seno	Angelo, Armir, Ilir, Juela, Juxhin, Keijsi, Lore, Lorna, Mal, Selin, Stenaldo, Stine	Juxhin, Miri, Selin	Angelo, Greta, Keijsi, Kristi, Lore	Angelo, Greta, Keijsi, ~~Ilir~~	Erik, Ina, Keijsi, Mateo	Aleksandra, Angelo, Artan, Brikena, Greta, Ina, Juela, Keijsi, Kristi, Lorna, Mal, Mateo, Miri, Selin, Stelina, Stenaldo	Ina, Keijsi, Lorna, Miri, Selin	Angelo, Artan, Greta, Juela, ~~Keijsi~~, Krusita, Mal, Mateo, Miri, Rogert	Angelo, Artan, DJ Gimbo, Kristi, Mal, Mateo, Miri, Rogert, Stenaldo	DJ Gimbo, ~~Greta~~, Ina, Miri, Rogert, Selin	Artan, Baby G, DJ Gimbo, Greta, Ina, Krusita, Stelina, Stenaldo	Rogert	Brikena, Greta, Juela, Kristi, Krusita, Miri, Rogert, Stenaldo	Baby G, Greta, Ina, Miri, Rogert	Kristi	All housemates	Juela, Mal, Marko, Miri, Rogert, Selin	All housemates	DJ Gimbo, Greta, Selin, Rogert	Greta, Marko	Ardit, Artan, Juela, ~~Mal~~, Mateo, Miri, Rogert	Artan, Edisa, Egi, Juela, Rogert	Brikena, DJ Gimbo, ~~Mateo~~, ~~Selin~~		Artan, Nikol, Rogert, Selin, Stenaldo	Mateo, Stenaldo	Brikena, Edisa, Juela, Mal, Mateo, Nikol, Rogert, Selin	Edisa, Mal, Shëndrit	Brikena, Selin	Edisa, Juela, Shëndrit	Brikena, Edisa, Miri; Shëndrit	Brikena, Mateo, Miri, Rogert, Shëndrit	Mateo, Miri, Rogert, Selin	
Ejected	none												Keijsi	none							Kristi	none					Greta		none									
Walked	none						Stine	Ilir	Flori	none									Kristi	none					Alessio	none												
Evicted	Xhodi; Most votes to evict	Sabina; Fewest votes to save	Armela; Fewest votes to save	Seno; Most votes to evict	Armir; Fewest votes to save	Juxhin; Fewest votes to save	Lore; Fewest votes to save	Eviction cancelled	Erik; Fewest votes to save	Aleksandra; Fewest votes to save	Lorna; Most votes to evict	Eviction cancelled	Angelo; Fewest votes to save	Eviction cancelled	Stelina; Fewest votes to save	Rogert; Most votes to return	Krusita; Fewest votes to save	Baby G Fewest votes to save	Kristi; 73% to return	Ina; Fewest votes to save	Eviction cancelled	Livia; Fewest votes to save	Eviction cancelled	Marko; Most votes to evict	Ardit; Fewest votes to save	Egi; Fewest votes to save	DJ Gimbo; Most votes to evict		Artan; Fewest votes to save	Stenaldo; Fewest votes to save	Nikol; Fewest votes to save	Mal; Fewest votes to save	Selin; Most votes to be finalist	Juela; Fewest votes to save	Edisa; Fewest votes to save	Mateo, Miri, Rogert; Most votes to be finalist	Rogert; Fewest votes (out of 4)	Mateo; Fewest votes (out of 3)
Evicted	Xhodi; Most votes to evict	Sabina; Fewest votes to save	Armela; Fewest votes to save	Seno; Most votes to evict	Armir; Fewest votes to save	Juxhin; Fewest votes to save	Lore; Fewest votes to save	Eviction cancelled	Erik; Fewest votes to save	Aleksandra; Fewest votes to save	Lorna; Most votes to evict	Eviction cancelled	Angelo; Fewest votes to save	Eviction cancelled	Stelina; Fewest votes to save	Rogert; Most votes to return	Krusita; Fewest votes to save	Baby G Fewest votes to save	Kristi; 73% to return	Ina; Fewest votes to save	Eviction cancelled	Livia; Fewest votes to save	Eviction cancelled	Marko; Most votes to evict	Ardit; Fewest votes to save	Egi; Fewest votes to save	DJ Gimbo; Most votes to evict		Artan; Fewest votes to save	Stenaldo; Fewest votes to save	Nikol; Fewest votes to save	Mal; Fewest votes to save	Selin; Most votes to be finalist	Juela; Fewest votes to save	Edisa; Fewest votes to save	Shëndrit, Brikena; Fewest votes to be finalist	Miri; Fewest votes (out of 2)	Selin; Most votes to win

=== Notes ===
- ^Note 1: On Day 4, the newly entered housemates Armela, Juela, Juxhin and Stenaldo were granted special nomination powers. Juxhin and Stenaldo were first given the power to save one housemate each from possible nomination. Juxhin chose to save Brikena, while Stenaldo saved Ilir. Following this, Armela and Juela were each required to nominate one housemate to face the public vote. Armela nominated Lorna, and Juela nominated Kristi. Subsequently, Lorna and Kristi were also granted the power to nominate one additional housemate each. Lorna nominated Selin, while Kristi nominated Seno. As a result, Lorna, Kristi, Selin and Seno were nominated for the public vote. The public voted from Day 4 to Day 8 to save one of the nominated housemates. On Day 8, Kristi and Selin received the highest number of votes and were therefore removed from the nominations for that week. Lorna and Seno received the fewest votes and were given the power to nominate one housemate each. Lorna nominated Xhodi, while Seno nominated Angelo. Consequently, Angelo, Lorna, Seno and Xhodi were nominated for eviction. The viewers then voted to evict one housemate, with the contestant receiving the fewest votes being evicted from the Big Brother house on Day 8.
- ^Note 2: Brikena, Ilir, Kristi, Miri and Stine, as the viewers’ favourite housemates, had the power to save one housemate each from nomination. Brikena saved Juxhin, Ilir saved Seno, Kristi saved Angelo, Miri saved Selin and Stine saved Armir. The remaining housemates were nominated for eviction.
- ^Note 3: Keijsi, as the new housemate had immunity.
- ^Note 4: Keijsi, Kristi and Seno were automatically nominated due to breaking the rules.
- ^Note 5: Greta, Mateo and Stelina as the new housemates had immunity.
- ^Note 6: Greta, Mateo and Stelina were put in a special place inside the house, called "the aquarium". They had to choose one housemate each to move to the aquarium with them and also be immune. Greta chose Kristi, Mateo chose Brikena and Stelina chose Miri. The rest of the house were sent to nomination.
- ^Note 7: Juxhin, Miri and Selin were automatically nominated due to breaking the rules.
- ^Note 8: After a mission, Mal passed it successfully and is immune to these nominations.
- ^Note 9: Ina, as the new housemate had immunity, but in these nominations Stelina also benefits from her since they are 2 in 1 residents.
- ^Note 10: The viewers voted for their favorite housemate. The three housemates with the most votes were Kristi, Miri and Selin, who all three received immunity.
- ^Note 11: Aleksandra and Artan as the new housemates had immunity.
- ^Note 12: Aleksandra and Artan as new housemates, had the power to send two housemates against the public vote. Aleksandra chose Keijsi and Greta. Artan chose Angelo and Ilir. But Ilir walked from the competition due to medical reasons, and the eviction was cancelled.
- ^Note 13: The Black Envelope, sent Ina, Keijsi and Erik directly to the televoting due to breaking the rules. However, Brikena as Head of Household, had the power of saving someone in this nomination, and had the opportunity to separate Stelina and Ina, the only two housemates, with this separation she saved Stelina. Instead, she chose to send Mateo to the televoting.
- ^Note 14: A snap eviction was held with all housemates, except for new housemates Krusita and Rogert.
- ^Note 15: Mateo, who received the most votes in the public vote, started a chain of immunity. The last five housemates not chosen - Ina, Kejsi, Lorna, Miri and Selin - faced the public vote.
- ^Note 16: As new housemates, Baby G and DJ Gimbo were immune from the eviction. Kristi, Selin and Stenaldo also received immunity after winning the talent show competition.
- ^Note 17: Rogert due to breaking the rules, Big Brother announced that he would automatically face every eviction of the season until he was evicted, meaning he also could not be nominated by his fellow housemates in following weeks.
- ^Note 18: Greta as Head of Household, had the power to send either all the Men or all the Women to face the public vote, she chose the Men.
- ^Note 19: Selin as Head of Household, had to choose one group out of the three losing groups from a challenge to be put up for nomination. She chose her own group, the Blue Group. Since Rogert was part of the winning group, which had immunity, but he is permanently nominated, she had to swap a housemate from her group with Rogert. She chose to save Greta.
- ^Note 20: After Greta’s group (Artan, Baby G, DJ Gimbo, Ina, Krusita, ~~Rogert~~, Stelina) broke the dance challenge rules Big Brother decided that her group would face the public vote. Because of this, the nomination on Day 43 was cancelled. On Day 46 Rogert from Greta’s group was sent to the reflection room and a separate nomination until Day 50, to decide whether he should remain in the house due to breaking the rules. Stenaldo, who was not part of this group, was nominated due to breaking the rules.
- ^Note 21: Brikena, Greta, Juela, Kristi, Krusita, Miri and Stenaldo from the losing group of the challenge were nominated, and the housemate with the fewest votes will be eliminated on Day 53.
- ^Note 22: The three new housemates had the power on the upcoming nomination. They chose three housemates to take with them into the cave. Both the three new housemates and the three selected housemates have immunity. Livia chose Mateo, Ardit chose Selin, while Shëndrit chose Gimbo.
- ^Note 23: After an open televote during the show, the public decided with 73% of the votes that Kristi would return to the house. He left the house by exiting through the wall. He has now lost the power to nominate and to be chosen as Head of Household.
- ^Note 24: On Day 64 Big Brother sent all the housemates to a televoting due to breaking the rules and the housemate with the fewest votes will be eliminated on Day 67.
- ^Note 25: Juela opened the Pandora Box, and she had the right to send three housemates to face the public vote. She sent Gimbo, Greta and Selin.
- ^Note 26: The Black Envelope sent Greta and Marko to face the public vote head to head for breaking the rules and the housemate with the most votes to evict will leave the house on Day 71.
- ^Note 27: Edisa, Egi and Nikol as the new housemates had immunity.
- ^Note 28: Stenaldo as the Head of Household, had the power to save a housemate from the televoting and send another one. He chose to save Mal and sent Mateo to the televoting.
- ^Note 29: Miri as the Head of Household, had the power to send two couples to the televoting. Nikol and Rogert refused to become a couple so they had immunity. He chose to send singularly Brikena-Selin and Gimbo-Mateo. Brikena and Gimbo as they are the two housemates with the fewest votes will go to the televoting head to head on Day 85 and the one with the most votes to evict will leave the house on Day 88.
- ^Note 30: Miri as the Head of Household, started a chain of immunity. The last four housemates not chosen - Artan, Nikol, Selin and Stenaldo - faced the public vote with Rogert.
- ^Note 31: Rogert as the Head of Household, had the power to nominate a couple from the challenge. He chose to send to the televoting head to head Mateo and Stenaldo and the housemate with the fewest votes will leave the house on Day 95.
- ^Note 32: Shëndrit as the Head of Household, had immunity alongst with Miri that won the budget challenge. The rest of the housemates were nominated for eviction and the housemate with the fewest votes will leave the house on Day 99.
- ^Note 33: On Day 99 Shëndrit opened the Pandora Box, so he had to nominate himself with two other housemates. He chose to send himself with Edisa and Mal and the housemate with the fewest votes will leave the house on Day 103.
- ^Note 34: Brikena as the Head of Household, had the power to nominate for the final herself with another housemate that was there from the first day (between Miri and Selin). The housemate with the most votes will be granted a place in the final while the housemates with the fewest votes will continue the game. She chose to send herself with Selin.
- ^Note 35: On Day 106, all the housemates nominated who they want to win. No one nominated Edisa, Juela and Shëndrit so they went to the televoting.
- ^Note 36: On Day 109 Edisa and Shëndrit, were up for another eviction, but they had the power to nominate a housemate to send with them to the televoting. Edisa nominated Brikena and Shëndrit nominated Miri.
- ^Note 37: Only 3 housemates out of the last 5 will be able to reach the Final, the 2 housemates with the fewest votes will be eliminated on Day 113.
- ^Note 38: At the final round, the public voted for the winner.
