= Big Brother VIP (Albanian TV series) season 3 =

Big Brother VIP
- Season 3
- Season 3 logo
- Hosted by: Ledion Liço
- No. of days: 134
- No. of housemates: 36
- Winner: Egla Ceno
- Runner-up: Julian Deda
- Companion shows: Big Brother VIP – Fans' Club; Big Brother Radio; Post Big Brother VIP
- No. of episodes: 152

Release
- Original network: Top Channel
- Original release: 13 January – 25 May 2024

Season chronology
- ← Previous; Season 2 Next → Season 4

Big Brother VIP 3, was the third season of Big Brother VIP, hosted by Ledion Liço, replacing Arbana Osmani. The season began airing on 13 January 2024 on Top Channel, and ended after 134 days on 25 May 2024. The whole season, live from the house, can be viewed in two live pay-per-view channels, with the name Big Brother VIP 1 and Big Brother VIP 2, which are available on Albanian television platform DigitAlb. Arbër Hajdari returned as opinionist in the live evictions shows and was joined by Ori Nebijaj, replacing Zhaklin Lekatari. In the third live show, season 1 finalist Einxhel Shkira replaced Arbër Hajdari who was temporarily away.

The spin-off show Big Brother VIP – Fans' Club was hosted this season, by singer and television presenter Enxhi Nasufi. The two opinionists for the third season were season 2 housemate Ronaldo Sharka and reality TV star Ina Kollçaku. The 60-minute radio show Big Brother Radio returned for the second season, with Elona Duro, Eni Shehu and Albana Ruçi as the hosts. Like in the last seasons, one week after the final of the show, was broadcast a reunion show, with the name Post Big Brother VIP. The two episodes were broadcast on 28 May 2024 and 1 June 2024. The show was hosted by Ledion Liço, and the two opinionists were Arbër Hajdari and Ori Nebijaj.

On 25 May 2024, Egla Ceno was announced as the winner of the season, with Julian Deda as the runner-up.

== Production ==
In May 2023, the executive producer, Sara Hoxha announced on her Instagram account, that the third season of the show will begin on Top Channel.

It was rumored that maybe Osmani will not be the presenter for the third season. Later, it was rumored that Bora Zemani, who hosts also on Top Channel the show Dancing with the Stars, will be hosting the third season of Big Brother VIP. It was also rumored that the host of the eighth season of the original version of Big Brother Albania, Ledion Liço will host the season. In November 2023, Osmani on her social network Instagram has posted a photo as she is seen in the premises of Top Channel getting ready, but it was not announced if she will host the third season.

On 30 November 2023, it was announced that the show will return, with the third season, on 2024. One day later, Top Channel aired a teaser trailer during the ninth episode of the ninth season of Dancing with the Stars, officially confirming that the series would return for a new season in January 2024 on Top Channel. On 29 December 2023, Top Channel announced that the host will be Ledion Liço. On 29 December 2023, Top Channel released a thirty seconds teaser featuring some eyes and read "Everyone Housemates except for one" and then features, the new host Ledion Liço, who says "And these others, who are they?" and at the end we hear "Find out from 13 January only on Top Channel". On 8 January 2023, Top Channel announced that Hajdari will be returning for his third season as a opinionist and it was also announced that the new opinionist will be Ori Nebijaj.

On 29 December 2023, Top Channel announced that the season would begin on 13 January 2024.

== Housemates ==
Celebrity	Age on entry	Notability	Day entered	Day exited	Status
Egla Ceno	47	Actress	1	134	Winner
Julian Deda	42	Comedian & Actor	1	134	Runner-up
Romeo Veshaj	28	Actor & TV host	1	134	3rd Place
Heidi Baci	26	Reality TV Star & Model	1	134	4th Place
Meriton Mjekiqi	29	Journalist, Moderator & Producer	1	134	5th Place
Françeska Murati	28	Miss Central London	25	127	Evicted
Graciano Tagani	32	Choreographer & dancer	11	39	Evicted
Graciano Tagani	32	Choreographer & dancer	78	123	Evicted
Erjola Doçi	26	Model	11	50	Evicted
Erjola Doçi	26	Model	50	120	Evicted
Roza Lati	35	TV Host	1	120	Evicted
Shkëlqim Bega	28	Reality TV Star & Boxer	106	116	Evicted
Armand "Liam Mandiaro" Osmani	44	Reality TV star & DJ	50	51	Evicted
Armand "Liam Mandiaro" Osmani	44	Reality TV star & DJ	67	106	Evicted
Amarildo "Lidi" Delia	32	Moderator & Animator	81	99	Evicted
Jetmir Salaj	40	Reality TV star	50	99	Walked
Rike Roçi	35	Reality TV star & Actress	1	67	Evicted
Rike Roçi	35	Reality TV star & Actress	67	92	Evicted
Ilnisa Agolli	37	Journalist	1	85	Evicted
Julia Ilirjani	50	Actress	43	78	Evicted
Ledjona Xheladinaj	34	Investigative journalist	1	74	Evicted
Vesa Smolica	32	Singer	1	71	Evicted
Sara Karaj	27	Miss Albania	43	64	Evicted
Silver "Silvi Fort" Topalli	32	Singer, Entrepreneur & Producer	43	60	Evicted
Bardhul "Bardhi" Idrizi	26	Singer & Songwriter	4	57	Walked
Sara Gjordeni	28	Miss Globe	1	15	Ejected
Sara Gjordeni	28	Miss Globe	15	53	Ejected
Fation Kuqari	29	Reality TV Star	4	50	Walked
Gazmend Ujkashi	60	Cosmetologist	1	46	Evicted
Arta Kabashi	31	Singer	4	43	Evicted
Albi Nako	47	Ballet Master	4	43	Evicted
Endrik Beba	34	Singer	25	36	Evicted
Dea Vieri	26	Reality TV Star	4	32	Evicted
Elvis Myrta	37	Journalist	1	32	Evicted
Meri Shehu	54	Astrologist	1	29	Evicted
Olsi Bylyku	25	Comedian & Singer	8	22	Evicted
Gabriele Mezini	29	Football player	1	22	Evicted
Ervin Gonxhi	38	Violinist, Producer & Composer	1	18	Evicted
Alfio Rrotani	34	Chef	1	11	Evicted
Klodian Duro	46	Former national football player	4	9	Ejected
Drini Zeqo	41	Journalist	1	5	Walked

== Nominations table ==
	Week 2		Week 3		Week 4		Week 5			Week 6			Week 7		Week 8	Week 9		Week 10		Week 11		Week 12	Week 13	Week 14	Week 15	Week 16	Week 17			Week 18		Week 19	Week 20 Final		Nominations received
	Day 8	Day 11	Day 15	Day 18	Day 22	Day 25	Day 29	Day 32		Day 36	Day 39	Day 43		Day 46	Week 8	Day 57	Day 60	Day 64	Day 67	Day 71	Day 74	Week 12	Week 13	Week 14	Week 15	Week 16	Day 113	Day 116	Day 120	Day 121	Day 123	Week 19	Week 20 Final		Nominations received
Viewers’ Favorite	none		Ilnisa, Julian, Romeo	none						Heidi, Julian, Ledjona	none						Julian, Romeo	none	Heidi	none	Meriton	none	Romeo	none											
Egla	Exempt	Ilnisa, Sara G.	No; Nominations	Sara G., Meri	Nominated	Bardhi	No; Nominations	Nominated	Françeska, Endrik	Nominated	No; Nominations	Nominated	Nominated	Roza, Ledjona	Bardhi	No; Nominations	No; Nominations	Nominated	No; Nominations	Ilnisa, Roza	Nominated	Nominated	Saved	Roza, Meriton	Françeska, Roza	Heidi, Romeo	Nominated	No; Nominations	Nominated	No; Nominations	Nominated	Nominated	Winner (Day 134)		23
Julian	Exempt	Gabriele, Roza	No; Nominations	Meriton, Fation	Nominated	Heidi	No; Nominations	Nominated	Egla, Arta	Romeo, Ilnisa	Nominated	Nominated	Nominated	Egla, Meriton	Ledjona	No; Nominations	Sara K., Ilnisa	No; Nominations	No; Nominations	Jetmir, Romeo	No; Nominations	Not eligible	Nominated	Françeska, Liam	Heidi, Romeo	No; Nominations	Nominated	No; Nominations	Saved	Nominated	Exempt	Exempt	Runner-up (Day 134)		10
Romeo	Exempt	Roza, Sara G.	No; Nominations	Dea, Julian	Nominated	Elvis	Nominated	Nominated	Endrik, Albi	Nominated	Nominated	Nominated	No; Nominations	Françeska, Roza	Heidi	No; Nominations	Roza, Françeska	No; Nominations	No; Nominations	Ledjona, Ilnisa	No; Nominations	Not eligible	Heidi, Egla, Lidi	Liam, Jetmir	Liam, Graciano	Nominated	Exempt	Exempt	Julian, Meriton	Exempt	Exempt	Exempt	Third place (Day 134)		9
Heidi	Gazmend, Vesa	Roza, Sara G.	No; Nominations	Meriton, Gabriele	Nominated	Romeo	Nominated	Nominated	Endrik, Albi	Roza, Graciano	No; Nominations	Nominated	No; Nominations	Roza, Françeska	Egla	No; Nominations	No; Nominations	No; Nominations	Françeska, Vesa, Roza	Ledjona, Françeska	No; Nominations	Not eligible	Saved	Liam, Jetmir	Roza, Françeska	Nominated	Nominated	Nominated	Nominated	No; Nominations	Nominated	Nominated	Fourth place (Day 134)		11
Meriton	Exempt	Heidi, Julian	No; Nominations	Fation, Julian	Nominated	Saved	No; Nominations	Nominated	Françeska, Endrik	Nominated	Nominated	Nominated	No; Nominations	Françeska, Erjola	Ilnisa	No; Nominations	No; Nominations	No; Nominations	No; Nominations	Ledjona, Erjola	Exempt	Nominated	Nominated	Erjola, Lidi	Erjola, Roza	No; Nominations	Nominated	No; Nominations	Saved	Nominated	Nominated	Nominated	Fifth place (Day 134)		16
Françeska	Not in House						No; Nominations	Nominated	Endrik, Albi	No; Nominations	No; Nominations	Nominated	No; Nominations	Egla, Meriton	Saved	No; Nominations	Nominated	No; Nominations	Nominated	Julia, Ilnisa	No; Nominations	Not eligible	Nominated	Lidi, Erjola	Liam, Erjola	No; Nominations	Nominated	Erjola, Roza, Françeska	Nominated	No; Nominations	Nominated	Nominated	Evicted (Day 127)		30
Graciano	Not in House		Exempt	Gazmend, Olsi	Nominated	Ledjona	Romeo, Elvis, Heidi	Nominated	Egla, Vesa	Nominated	Evicted (Day 39)											Not eligible	Nominated	Lidi, Romeo	Liam, Roza	No; Nominations	Nominated	No; Nominations	Nominated	No; Nominations	Nominated	Re-evicted (Day 123)			2
Erjola	Not in House		Exempt	Meri, Gabriele	Nominated	Meriton	No; Nominations	Nominated	Françeska, Endrik	No; Nominations	No; Nominations	Nominated	No; Nominations	Meriton, Françeska	Nominated	No; Nominations	No; Nominations	No; Nominations	No; Nominations	Heidi, Françeska	No; Nominations	Not eligible	Nominated	Liam, Françeska	Liam, Françeska	No; Nominations	Nominated	Nominated	Nominated	Re-evicted (Day 120)					12
Roza	Exempt	Ledjona, Meri	No; Nominations	Ledjona, Meri	Nominatedj	Albi	No; Nominations	Nominated	Françeska, Egla	Nominated	No; Nominations	Nominated	No; Nominations	Meriton, Romeo	Rike	No; Nominations	Nominated	No; Nominations	Nominated	Egla, Jetmir	Nominated	Not eligible	Nominated	Egla, Lidi	Heidi, Meriton	No; Nominations	Nominated	Nominated	Evicted (Day 120)						19
Shkëlqim	Not in House																									No; Nominations	Nominated	Evicted (Day 116)							0
Liam	Not in House														Exempt	Ejected (Day 51)			No; Nominations	Jetmir, Heidi	Nominated	Not eligible	Nominated	Lidi, Heidi	Julian, Romeo	Evicted (Day 106)									8
Lidi	Not in House																						Saved	Jetmir, Meriton	Evicted (Day 99)										5
Jetmir	Not in House														Exempt	No; Nominations	No; Nominations	No; Nominations	No; Nominations	Julian, Egla	No; Nominations	Not eligible	Nominated	Romeo, Egla	Walked (Day 99)										7
Rike	Exempt	Gabriele, Meri	No; Nominations	Meri, Erjola	Nominated	Roza	No; Nominations	Nominated	Françeska, Endrik	No; Nominations	No; Nominations	Nominated	No; Nominations	Françeska, Egla	Vesa	No; Nominations	No; Nominations	Nominated	No; Nominations	Egla, Jetmir	Nominated	Not eligible	Nominated	Re-evicted (Day 92)											2
Ilnisa	Exempt	Fation, Ledjona	No; Nominations	Fation, Gabriele	Nominated	Nominated	No; Nominations	Nominated	Françeska, Endrik	Nominated	No; Nominations	Nominated	No; Nominations	Ledjona, Sara G.	Julia	No; Nominations	Nominated	No; Nominations	No; Nominations	Egla, Ledjona	Nominated	Nominated	Evicted (Day 85)												25
Julia	Not in House													Egla, Ledjona	Julian	No; Nominations	No; Nominations	No; Nominations	No; Nominations	Egla, Ledjona	Nominated	Evicted (Day 78)													2
Ledjona	Exempt	Ilnisa, Roza	No; Nominations	Gazmend, Ilnisa	Nominated	Julian	No; Nominations	Nominated	Egla, Sara G.	Egla, Meriton	No; Nominations	Nominated	No; Nominations	Ilnisa, Egla	Erjola	Nominated	No; Nominations	No; Nominations	Nominated	Ilnisa, Heidi	Evicted (Day 74)														14
Vesa	Gabriele, Gazmend	Ilnisa, Sara G.	Nominated	Ilnisa, Gabriele	Nominated	Arta	No; Nominations	Nominated	Françeska, Endrik	No; Nominations	No; Nominations	Nominated	No; Nominations	Françeska, Egla	Romeo	No; Nominations	No; Nominations	No; Nominations	Nominated	Evicted (Day 71)															4
Sara K.	Not in House													Bardhi, Ilnisa	Saved	No; Nominations	Nominated	Evicted (Day 64)																	1
Silvi	Not in House													Ilnisa, Meriton	Saved	Nominated	Evicted (Day 60)																		0
Bardhi	Exempt	Ilnisa, Roza	No; Nominations	Meri, Dea	Nominated	Sara G.	No; Nominations	Nominated	Françeska, Albi	No; Nominations	Nominated	Nominated	No; Nominations	Erjola, Françeska	Sara G.	No; Nominations	Walked (Day 57)																		3
Sara G.	Exempt	Arta, Egla	Evicted (Day 15)	Dea, Erjola	Nominated	Fation	No; Nominations	Nominated	Françeska, Endrik	No; Nominations	No; Nominations	Nominated	Nominated	Françeska, Erjola	Meriton	Ejected (Day 53)																			15
Fation	Exempt	Gabriele, Ilnisa	Nominated	Ilnisa, Gabriele	Nominated	Dea	No; Nominations	Nominated	Gazmend, Egla	No; Nominations	Nominated	Nominated	No; Nominations	Meriton, Ilnisa	Walked (Day 50)																				7
Gazmend	Alfio, Ervin	Fation, Ledjona	No; Nominations	Ilnisa, Fation	Nominated	Nominated	No; Nominations	Nominated	Egla, Françeska	No; Nominations	Nominated	Nominated	Nominated	Evicted (Day 46)																					10
Arta	Exempt	Ledjona, Sara G.	No; Nominations	Julian, Ilnisa	Nominated	Rike	No; Nominations	Nominated	Endrik, Albi	No; Nominations	No; Nominations	Nominated	Evicted (Day 43)																						3
Albi	Exempt	Arta, Vesa	No; Nominations	Gabriele, Sara G.	Nominated	Graciano	No; Nominations	Nominated	Françeska, Gazmend	No; Nominations	Nominated	Evicted (Day 43)																							5
Endrik	Not in House						No; Nominations	Nominated	Egla, Françeska	Evicted (Day 36)																									11
Dea	Exempt	Meriton, Sara G.	No; Nominations	Ilnisa, Sara G.	Nominated	Erjola	No; Nominations	Nominated	Evicted (Day 32)																										4
Elvis	Exempt	Gazmend, Julian	No; Nominations	Meriton, Bardhi	Nominated	Egla	Nominated	Evicted (Day 32)																											1
Meri	Nominated	Rike, Roza	No; Nominations	Sara G., Meriton	Nominated	Nominated	Evicted (Day 29)																												7
Olsi	Exempt	Dea, Ilnisa	No; Nominations	Ilnisa, Gazmend	Nominated	Evicted (Day 22)																													1
Gabriele	Alfio, Heidi	Julian, Sara G.	Nominated	Fation, Julian	Evicted (Day 22)																														11
Ervin	Gazmend, Heidi	Ilnisa, Sara G.	Nominated	Evicted (Day 18)																															1
Alfio	Gabriele, Gazmend	Evicted (Day 11)																																	2
Klodian	Exempt	Ejected (Day 9)																																	0
Drini	Walked (Day 5)																																		0
Notes	1, 2	3	4, 5, 6, 7	none	8	9	10, 11	none	12	13	14																								
Against public vote	Alfio, Gabriele, Gazmend, Heidi, Meri	Ilnisa, Ledjona, Roza, Sara G.	~~Elvis~~, Ervin, Fation, Gabriele, Vesa	Fation, Gabriele, Ilnisa, Julian, Meri, Meriton, Sara G.	All housemates	Gazmend, Ilnisa, Meri	Elvis, Heidi, Romeo	All housemates	Egla, Endrik, Françeska	Egla, Graciano, Ilnisa, Meriton, Romeo, Roza	Albi, Bardhi, Fation, Gazmend, Julian, Meriton, Romeo	All housemates	Egla, Gazmend, Julian, Sara G.	Egla, Erjola, Françeska, Ilnisa, Ledjona, Meriton, Roza	Bardhi, Egla, Erjola, Heidi, Ilnisa, Julia, Julian, Ledjona, Meriton, Rike, Romeo, Roza, Sara G., Vesa	Ledjona, Silvi	Françeska, Ilnisa, Roza, Sara K.	Egla, Rike	Françeska, Ledjona, Roza, Vesa	Egla, Heidi, Ilnisa, Jetmir, Ledjona	Egla, Ilnisa, Julia, Liam, Rike, Roza	Egla, Ilnisa, Meriton	Erjola, Françeska, Graciano, Jetmir, Julian, Liam, Meriton, Rike, Roza	Egla, Erjola, Françeska, ~~Jetmir,~~; Liam, Lidi, Meriton, Romeo	Erjola, Françeska, Heidi, Liam, Romeo, Roza	Heidi, Romeo	Egla, Erjola, Françeska, Graciano, Heidi, Julian, Meriton, Roza, Shkëlqim	Erjola, Françeska, Heidi, Roza	Egla, Erjola, Françeska, Graciano, Heidi	Julian, Meriton	Egla, Françeska, Graciano, Heidi, Meriton	Egla, Françeska, Heidi, Meriton	Egla, Heidi, Julian, Meriton, Romeo		
Ejected	Klodian	none													Liam, Sara G.	none																			
Walked	Drini	none													Fation	Bardhi	none							Jetmir	none										
Evicted	Alfio; Fewest votes to save	Sara G. Fewest votes to save	Ervin; Most votes to evict	Gabriele; Fewest votes to save	Olsi; Fewest votes to save	Meri; Fewest votes to save	Elvis; Fewest votes to save	Dea; Fewest votes to save	Endrik; Fewest votes to save	Graciano; Fewest votes to save	Albi; Fewest votes to save	Arta; Fewest votes to save	Gazmend; Fewest votes to save	Erjola; Fewest votes to save	Eviction cancelled	Silvi; Fewest votes to save	Sara K. Fewest votes to save	Rike; Fewest votes to save	Vesa; Fewest votes to save	Ledjona; Fewest votes to save	Julia; Fewest votes to save	Ilnisa; Fewest votes to save	Rike; Fewest votes to save	Lidi; Fewest votes to save	Liam; Fewest votes to save	Romeo; Most votes to be finalist	Shkëlqim; Fewest votes to save	Roza; Fewest votes to save	Erjola; Fewest votes to save	Julian; Most votes to be finalist	Graciano; Fewest votes to save	Egla, Heidi, Meriton; Most votes to be finalist	Meriton; Fewest votes (out of 5)	Heidi; Fewest votes (out of 4)	
Evicted	Alfio; Fewest votes to save	Sara G. Fewest votes to save	Ervin; Most votes to evict	Gabriele; Fewest votes to save	Olsi; Fewest votes to save	Meri; Fewest votes to save	Elvis; Fewest votes to save	Dea; Fewest votes to save	Endrik; Fewest votes to save	Graciano; Fewest votes to save	Albi; Fewest votes to save	Arta; Fewest votes to save	Gazmend; Fewest votes to save	Erjola; Fewest votes to save	Eviction cancelled	Silvi; Fewest votes to save	Sara K. Fewest votes to save	Rike; Fewest votes to save	Vesa; Fewest votes to save	Ledjona; Fewest votes to save	Julia; Fewest votes to save	Ilnisa; Fewest votes to save	Rike; Fewest votes to save	Lidi; Fewest votes to save	Liam; Fewest votes to save	Romeo; Most votes to be finalist	Shkëlqim; Fewest votes to save	Roza; Fewest votes to save	Erjola; Fewest votes to save	Julian; Most votes to be finalist	Graciano; Fewest votes to save	Egla, Heidi, Meriton; Most votes to be finalist	Romeo; Fewest votes (out of 3)	Julian; Fewest votes (out of 2)	
Evicted	Alfio; Fewest votes to save	Sara G. Fewest votes to save	Ervin; Most votes to evict	Gabriele; Fewest votes to save	Olsi; Fewest votes to save	Meri; Fewest votes to save	Elvis; Fewest votes to save	Dea; Fewest votes to save	Endrik; Fewest votes to save	Graciano; Fewest votes to save	Albi; Fewest votes to save	Arta; Fewest votes to save	Gazmend; Fewest votes to save	Erjola; Fewest votes to save	Eviction cancelled	Silvi; Fewest votes to save	Sara K. Fewest votes to save	Rike; Fewest votes to save	Vesa; Fewest votes to save	Ledjona; Fewest votes to save	Julia; Fewest votes to save	Ilnisa; Fewest votes to save	Rike; Fewest votes to save	Lidi; Fewest votes to save	Liam; Fewest votes to save	Romeo; Most votes to be finalist	Shkëlqim; Fewest votes to save	Roza; Fewest votes to save	Erjola; Fewest votes to save	Julian; Most votes to be finalist	Graciano; Fewest votes to save	Françeska; Fewest votes to be finalist	Egla; Most votes to win		

=== Notes ===
- ^Note 1: Meri was automatically nominated due to breaking the rules.
- ^Note 2: The viewers voted for their favorite housemate. The six housemates with the fewest votes (Alfio, Ervin, Gabriele, Gazmend, Heidi and Vesa) were the nominees to be nominated for eviction and also only they could vote. All other housemates had immunity.
- ^Note 3: Sara G. was evicted by the public, but she was revealed to have picked the Return Ticket, therefore she went back into the House.
- ^Note 4: Vesa was automatically nominated due to breaking the rules.
- ^Note 5: Erjola and Graciano, as the new housemates had immunity.
- ^Note 6: The viewers voted for their favorite housemate. The 3 most favorite housmates were announced, along with the 3 least favorite housmates. The least favorite housmates were Elvis, Ervin and Gabriele, who were put up for nomination.
- ^Note 7: Egla, as the Head of Household, was given an advantage, which was the ability to replace one of the nominees with another player. Their choice was to replace Elvis with Fation.
- ^Note 8: Due to the housemates breaking the rules during the challenge, a second nomination took place with all the housemates against the public vote.
- ^Note 9: Gazmend was automatically nominated due to breaking the rules.
- ^Note 10: Each housemate had to save another housemate through a saving chain. Vesa began to choose, as she was the Head of Household. Ilnisa and Meri were the last housemates standing, as they were not saved, and thus became the nominees.
- ^Note 11: On day 29, Graciano was tempted by the Pandora's box, which he chose to open. The good consequence was two travel tickets for him, while the bad consequence was: He had to send three housemates for nomination. His choice was: Elvis, Heidi and Romeo.
- ^Note 12: On Day 32, the viewers voted for their favorite housemate. The nine housemates with the fewest votes (Albi, Arta, Egla, Endrik, Erjola, Françeska, Gazmend, Sara G. and Vesa) were the nominees to be nominated for eviction. All other housemates had immunity.
- ^Note 13: Heidi, Julian and Ledjona were the viewers favorite and had the power to send six housemates for nomination. Each housemate voted for two housemates. Heidi nominated Roza and Graciano, Julian nominated Romeo and Ilnisa while Ledjona nominated Egla and Meriton.
- ^Note 14: On day 39, Sara G. was tempted by the Pandora's box, which she chose to open. The good consequence was, had access to search the network for what has been written about her on the network within 120 seconds. The bad consequence was: Sara G. had to decide if she would send all the boys or all the girls of the house for nomination, while she and Ledjona, as the Head of Household were immune. Sara G. choice was to send all the boys for nomination.

== Controversies ==
In a stunning turn of events, just one day after becoming a participant in Big Brother VIP, the police stormed the premises of the house to arrest contestant Liam Osmani, 44 years old, who is accused of fraud. This individual, in 2019, through fraudulent means, obtained 17 tourist tickets to Germany without making the corresponding payments.

Through an official announcement, the police explained that the Prosecutor's Office of Tirana, on May 9, 2022, issued an order for the execution of the penal decision dated February 23, 2022, sentencing this citizen to 2 years and 6 months in prison for the criminal offense of "Fraud".
