= Ilir Vrenozi =

Albanian social media personality and political commentator

- Born: May 7, 1971 (age 55); Korçë, Albania
- Occupations: Social media personality, Political commentator
- Years active: 2016–present

Ilir Vrenozi (born May 7, 1971) is an Albanian social media personality and political commentator from Korça, Albania. He is known for his social media videos containing satire and critiques towards the Albanian political class and especially his opposition to Prime Minister Edi Rama.

He was one of the contestants of the reality show Big Brother VIP Albania 5.

== Political and social activism ==
Vrenozi began attracting public attention around 2015 when he started broadcasting live on social media. In his video commentaries he addresses political, economic, social themes and talks about current affairs. Vrenozi is active on Instagram, TikTok and Facebook.

Vrenozi is a local activist and has participated in Democratic Party rallies in Korça. His ironic and provocative critiques of Rama's absurd grandiosity have brought him into media prominence, to the point where Rama himself has labeled him the "true leader" of the Democratic Party.

== Participation in Big Brother VIP ==
In December 2025 he was among the first contestants to enter the television show Big Brother VIP Albania 5, where he presented himself as "the people's VIP".

== Personal life ==
Vrenozi is the father of two children.
