= List of awards and nominations received by Tuna =

The following is a list of awards and nominations received by Macedonian-Albanian singer Tuna.

== Dancing with the Stars ==
Year	Nominee / work	Award	Result
2015	"Tuna"	Winner	Won

== Kënga Magjike ==
Year	Nominee / work	Award	Result
2005	"Testament"	Critic Prize	Won
2005	"Testament"	Producer Prize	Won
2016	"Duam"	Critic Prize	Won

== NotaFest Awards ==
Year	Nominee / work	Award	Result
2002	"Ciao Machoman"	First Prize Of Jury	Won
2002	"Ciao Machoman"	First Prize of Public	Won
2002	"Ciao Machoman"	Best Lyrics	Won
2002	"Ciao Machoman"	Best Performer	Won
2002	"Ciao Machoman"	Best Stage Presentation	Won
2002	"Ciao Machoman"	Arazhmani Prize	Won
2002	"Ciao Machoman"	Best Orchestration	Won
2002	"Ciao Machoman"	Best Composition	Won
2002	"Ciao Machoman"	Best New Artist	Won
2002	"Ciao Machoman"	Televoting Prize	Won

== Prive Klan Kosova ==
Year	Nominee / work	Award	Result
2013	"Herself"	Person of The Year 2013	Won

== Top Fest ==
Year	Nominee / work	Award	Result
2006	"Forca e femres (feat Jonida Maliqi)"	Best Female	Won
2007	"Bileta"	Best Song	Won

== Videofest Awards ==
Year	Nominee / work	Award	Result
2003	"Piroman"	Best Female	Nominated
2005	S'ka me diktature	Best Female	Won
2005	S'ka me diktature	Best All / First Prize	Nominated
2008	"Bileta"	Best Styling	Won
2008	"Bileta"	Best Promoted Video	Won
2008	"Bileta"	Best Pop	Nominated
2010	"E boj nxet (ft.Vig Popa)"	Best R&B	Nominated
2011	"Pse jo"	Best R&B	Nominated
2011	"Vibe(ft. Dafina Zeqiri, 2po2)"	Best Performance	Nominated
2012	"Dyshemeja"	Best Female	Nominated
2012	"Dyshemeja"	Best Pop	Nominated
2013	"I asaj"	Best R&B	Nominated
2013	"I asaj"	Best Styling	Nominated
2013	"I asaj"	Best Performance	Won
2013	"I asaj"	Best Female	Won
2014	"Fenix (ft.Cozman)"	Best Collaboration	Won
2014	"Fenix (ft.Cozman)"	Best R&B	Nominated
2014	"Fenix (ft.Cozman)"	Best Styling	Nominated

== Zhurma Show Awards ==
Year	Nominee / work	Award	Result
2004	"12 Muaj"	Best R&B	Won
2005	"Ska Më Diktaturë"	Best R&B Album	Won
2005	"Psikologët"	Best R&B	Won
2011	"E para dhe e fundit"	Best Video / First Prize	Nominated
2011	"E para dhe e fundit"	Best R&B	Nominated
2011	"E para dhe e fundit"	Best Female	Nominated
2012	"I asaj"	Best Video / First Prize	Won
2012	"I asaj"	Internet Award	Won
2012	"I asaj"	Best R&B	Won
2012	"I asaj"	Best Female	Nominated
2013	"Fenix (ft.Cozman)"	Best Collaboration	Won
2014	"MMV (ft.Ghetto Geasy)"	Best Video / First Prize	Nominated
2014	"MMV (ft.Ghetto Geasy)"	Best Collaboration	Nominated
2015	"Nobody there"	Best Performance	Nominated
2015	"Nobody there"	Best R&B	Nominated
2016	"Dy Tima"	Best R&B	Nominated
2016	"Dy Tima"	Best Female	Nominated
