= My Music =

My Music may refer to:

- My Music (radio programme), a British radio panel show which premiered on the BBC Home Service in 1967, and later a BBC2 television programme
- My Music (TV channel), an Albanian television channel, part of DigitAlb
- My Music (album), a 2005 album by Bosnian alternative rock band Sikter
- My Music (record label), a Polish independent label
- My Music, a series of television specials produced by TJ Lubinsky
- My Music, a special folder on the hard drive of a computer with a Microsoft Windows operating system, related to My Documents
- "My Music", a 1973 song by Loggins and Messina from their Full Sail LP
- MyMusic, an online transmedia sitcom created by The Fine Brothers in 2012
