= Ilir Shaqiri =

Albanian-Italian ballet dancer and choreographer (born 1973)

- Born: April 12, 1973 (age 53); Tirana, PSR Albania
- Education: National Ballet School of Albania
- Occupations: Ballet dancer, choreographer
- Years active: 1978–present
- Spouse: Emanuela Morini (m. 2022)
- Children: Emily Shaqiri

Ilir Shaqiri (born 12 April 1973) is an Albanian-born naturalized Italian dancer and choreographer. He appeared as a judge on the Albanian edition of Dancing with the Stars and participated in the first season of Big Brother VIP Albania, which he won in 2022.

== Early life and education ==
Shaqiri was born in Tirana, Albania, into a family of professional dancers. His father, Estref Shaqiri, was a soloist at the National Theatre of Opera and Ballet, while his mother, Mukades Erebara, was a principal dancer at the same institution. He began studying ballet at the age of 10 and joined the national ballet troupe as a soloist by the age of 18.

In 1991, he moved to Skopje, where he continued his studies at the Opera and Ballet Theatre of North Macedonia. The following year, he relocated to Italy to further his career in dance and television.

== Career ==
=== Dance and stage ===
Shaqiri's early performances included classical ballet productions such as The Nutcracker, Swan Lake, Giselle, Don Quixote, and Carmina Burana, staged at the Opera Theatre in Skopje. He later appeared in musical theater productions in Italy, including Rugantino and Il silenzio dei sogni, in which he played leading roles.

As a choreographer, he contributed to a variety of projects, including theatrical productions and televised events such as Giulietta e Romeo, La città dell'utopia, Telethon 2008, and Dance Dance Dance. He also provided artistic direction for advertising campaigns by brands such as Mazda and ENI Energia.

In 2006, Shaqiri received the "Best Television Personality" (Miglior Personaggio Televisivo) award from the Italian magazine TV-Radio Corriere. In 2003, he was named "Ambassador of Albania to the World" by the President of Albania Alfred Moisiu.

=== Television ===
Shaqiri began appearing on Italian television in the early 2000s, performing as a dancer on popular variety shows including Amici, C'è posta per te, La Corrida, La sai l’ultima, Buona Domenica, and Saranno Famosi.

From 2012 to 2018, he was a member of the jury on the Albanian edition of Dancing with the Stars, broadcast on Vizion Plus.

In 2022, he participated in and won the first season of Big Brother VIP Albania, broadcast on Top Channel.

In 2025, he hosted the semifinals and the final, of the talent show program Yjet Shqiptarë të Diasporës ("Albanian Stars of the Diaspora") alongside producer Ledja Liku. broadcast on Top Channel. He also founded the dance academy Étoile d’Ilir, training young dancers in Italy and Albania.

In April 2026, Shaqiri became a contestant on the third season of Ferma VIP.

== Personal life ==
Shaqiri met Italian actress Emanuela Morini in 2000 during a television program in Milan. The couple married after more than two decades together and reside in Rome. They have one daughter, Emily.
