= Big Brother VIP – Fans' Club =

- Genre: Reality television
- Presented by: Dojna Mema; Megi Pojani; Enxhi Nasufi; Heidi Baci; Kiara Tito
- Country of origin: Albania
- Original language: Albanian
- No. of seasons: 5
- No. of episodes: 87

Production
- Executive producers: Dojna Mema (2021–2022); Saimir Muzhaka (2023); Leda Hysa (2024–2025); Ronaldo Sharka (2025-)
- Running time: 60–75 minutes

Original release
- Network: Top Channel
- Release: 17 October 2021 – present

Related
- Big Brother VIP

Big Brother VIP – Fans' Club (often shortened to Fans' Club) is a companion spin-off of the Albanian reality series Big Brother VIP. It serves as the celebrity edition of Big Brother – Fans' Club. The show premiered on 17 October 2021 on Top Channel. Big Brother VIP – Fans' Club was announced in September 2021 and has received its own title card and promotional videos. Throughout its first season a total of 19 episodes aired and concluded on 15 February 2022. The series was renewed for a second season and began airing on 8 January 2023.

The first season was hosted by Dojna Mema. Mema did not return for the second season, and Megi Pojani took over as presenter. The presenter for the third season was Enxhi Nasufi, replacing Pojani. The show was renewed for a fourth season and the presenter was Heidi Baci. There was also a fifth season, with Kiara Tito as the presenter. Iva Tiço was on the first season, as the Opinionist. Ardit Cuni was the Opinionist for the second season of the show, replacing Tiço. On the third season, the two opinionist were Ronaldo Sharka and Ina Kollçaku, replacing Cuni. Sharka returned as the opinionist, with Shqipe Hysenaj as the new opinionist, replacing Kollçaku. On the fifth season the two opinionists were Arjan Konomi and Françeska Murati.

In the first season, the show was broadcast every Sunday at 12:15 pm and since the second season, is broadcasting every Sunday at 12:45 pm. The series follows the same format as Big Brother – Fans' Club, which features debates and conversations about the latest goings inside and outside the house with a studio audience and celebrity panel, and with the first eliminated housemate who are usually invited to the studio after leaving.

== Cast ==
Top Channel announced that Dojna Mema would be the presenter of the spin-off show. On 6 January 2023, it was announced that Megi Pojani, would replace Mema as the new Fans' Club presenter for the second season. On 11 January 2024, Enxhi Nasufi announced on the television show Ftesë në 5, that she will be the presenter of the third season of Big Brother VIP – Fans' Club. On 17 December 2024, it was announced that Big Brother VIP season 3 finalist, Heidi Baci will be the presenter for the fourth season. On 16 December 2025, it was announced that Big Brother VIP season 2 housemate Kiara Tito will be the presenter for the fifth season.

Iva Tiço was announced as the opinionist for the first season. It was announced that, season 1 housemate, Ardit Cuni was announced as the new opionist for the spin-off show, replacing Tiço. On 20 January 2024, on the official instagram account of Big Brother VIP – Fans' Club, it was announced that the two new opinionists are Big Brother VIP season 2 housemate Ronaldo Sharka and Ina Kollçaku. On 2 January 2025, it was announced that Sharka would return as opinionist and was joined by Big Brother VIP Kosova 2 finalist Shqipe Hysenaj. On 16 December 2025 were announced as opinionists Arjan Konomi and Big Brother VIP season 3 housemate Françeska Murati.

Fans' Club Cast
| Person | Season | | | | |
| Person | 1 | 2 | 3 | 4 | 5 |
Host
| Dojna Mema | | | | | |
| Megi Pojani | | | | | |
| Enxhi Nasufi | | | | | |
| Heidi Baci | | | | | |
| Kiara Tito | | | | | |
Opinionist
| Iva Tiço | | | | | |
| Ardit Çuni | | | | | |
| Ronaldo Sharka | | | | | |
| Ina Kollçaku | | | | | |
| Shqipe Hysenaj | | | | | |
| Arjan Konomi | | | | | |
| Françeska Murati | | | | | |

== Series overview ==
| Series | Episodes | Originally released | | | Big Brother VIP season |
| Series | Episodes | First released | Last released | Network | Big Brother VIP season |
|---|---|---|---|---|---|
| 1 | 19 | 17 October 2021 | 15 February 2022 | Top Channel | 1 |
| 2 | 18 | 8 January 2023 | 2 May 2023 | Top Channel | 2 |
| 3 | 18 | 21 January 2024 | 19 May 2024 | Top Channel | 3 |
| 4 | 15 | 5 January 2025 | 15 April 2025 | Top Channel | 4 |
| 5 | 17 | 21 December 2025 | 14 April 2026 | Top Channel | 5 |

== Episodes ==
=== Season 1 (2021–2022) ===
| No. overall | No. in season | Title | Day in house | Original release date |
|---|---|---|---|---|
| 1 | 1 | "Episode 1" | 13 | 17 October 2021 |
Special Guests: Ina Kollcaku and Graciano Tagani. Family or Friends Guests: Andrei (husband of housemate Rudina "Paloma" Demneri). Eliminated housemates: Elhaid Cufi.
| 2 | 2 | "Episode 2" | 20 | 24 October 2021 |
Special Guests: Suada Daci and Dasara Karaiskaj. Family or Friends Guests: Riad Shamliu (friend of housemate Granit Cana) and Jetmir Cuni (brother of housemate Ardit Cuni).
| 3 | 3 | "Episode 3" | 27 | 31 October 2021 |
Special Guests: Aulona Musta. Eliminated housemates: Sheila Haxhiraj and Rudina "Paloma" Demneri.
| 4 | 4 | "Episode 4" | 34 | 7 November 2021 |
Special Guests: Xhensila Pere and Bledi Strakosha. Family or Friends Guests: Ditea Berisha (sister of housemate Sarah Berisha). Eliminated housemates: Ardit Cuni.
| 5 | 5 | "Episode 5" | 41 | 14 November 2021 |
Special Guests: Fatma Haxhialiu and Ervin Kurti. Family or Friends Guests: Majlinda Krasniqi (sister of housemate Pajtim "DJ PM" Krasniqi) and Linda Jakic (mother of housemate Beniada Jakic Nishani). Eliminated housemates: Granit Cana and Ardit Cuni.
| 6 | 6 | "Episode 6" | 48 | 21 November 2021 |
Special Guests: Anaid Kaloti, Erjona Rusi and Mevlan Shaba. Eliminated housemates: Kledi Hysa and Igli Zarka.
| 7 | 7 | "Episode 7" | 55 | 28 November 2021 |
Special Guests: Ina Kollcaku and Arbër Zeka. Family or Friends Guests: Flori Gjini (friend of housemate Einxhel Shkira). Eliminated housemates: Granit Cana, Semi Jaupaj and Kledi Hysa.
| 8 | 8 | "Episode 8" | 62 | 5 December 2021 |
Special Guests: Aulona Musta, Anaid Kaloti and Atdhe Xharavina. Family or Friends Guests: Xhoi Jakaj (friend of housemate Beatrix Ramosaj) and Labinot Gashi (friend of housemate Besiana "Big Mama" Kasami). Eliminated housemates: Valon Shehu.
| 9 | 9 | "Episode 9" | 69 | 12 December 2021 |
Special Guests: Julka Gramo, Flavio Qarri and Ermal Peci. Family or Friends Guests: Aurora Gumnishta (sister of housemate Arbër "DJ Dagz" Gumnishta). Eliminated housemates: Sabian Medini.
| 10 | 10 | "Episode 10" | 76 | 19 December 2021 |
Special Guests: Graciano Tagani and Bledi Strakosha. Family or Friends Guests: Ditea Berisha (sister of housemate Sarah Berisha) and Majlinda Krasniqi (sister of housemate Pajtim "DJ PM" Krasniqi). Eliminated housemates: Pajtim "DJ PM" Krasniqi and Claudio Nika
| 11 | 11 | "Episode 11" | 83 | 26 December 2021 |
Special Guests: Flavio Qarri and Edona Gashi. Family or Friends Guests: Aurora Gumnishta (sister of housemate Arbër "DJ Dagz" Gumnishta). Eliminated housemates: Sabian Medini, Ardit Cuni and Besiana "Big Mama" Kasami
| 12 | 12 | "Episode 12" | 90 | 2 January 2022 |
Special Guests: Bledi Strakosha, Petrina Gorica, Lorina Mixha and Esmeralda Petrela. Family or Friends Guests: Tea Pasko (daughter of Monika Lubonja). Eliminated housemates: Antonela Berisha
| 13 | 13 | "Episode 13" | 97 | 9 January 2022 |
Special Guests: Aulona Musta and Arbër Zeka. Eliminated housemates: Sarah Berisha and Meridian Ramçaj
| 14 | 14 | "Episode 14" | 104 | 16 January 2022 |
Special Guests: Erjona Rusi, Erion Zeqiraj and Shqipe Hysenaj. Eliminated housemates: Filloreta "Fifi" Raçi and Eltion Merja
| 15 | 15 | "Episode 15" | 111 | 23 January 2022 |
Special Guests: Aulona Musta and Flavio Qarri. Eliminated housemates: Arbër "DJ Dagz" Gumnishta and Xheisara Frisku
| 16 | 16 | "Episode 16" | 118 | 30 January 2022 |
Special Guests: Erion Zeqiraj. Family or Friends Guests: Adriana Matoshi (friend of Arjola Demiri). Eliminated housemates: Ardit Cuni, Egzona Rafuna and Arbër Sulstarova
| 17 | 17 | "Episode 17" | 125 | 6 February 2022 |
Special Guests: Ermal Peci and Arba Gramo. Eliminated housemates: Beatrix Ramosaj and Dritan "Tan" Brama
| 18 | 18 | "Episode 18" | 132 | 13 February 2022 |
Special Guests: Bledi Strakosha and Erjona Rusi. Eliminated housemates: Arjola Demiri
| 19 | 19 | "Episode 19" | 134 | 15 February 2022 |
Special Guests: Flavio Qarri, Ermal Peci and Meri Shehu. Family or Friends Guests: Elgit Doda (friend of Donald Veshaj), Alois Shkira (brother of Einxhel Shkira), Estref Shaqiri (father of Ilir Shaqiri) and Ervin Kurti (friend of Beniada Jakic Nishani). Eliminated housemates: Monika Lubonja, Arjola Demiri, Dritan "Tan" Brama, Egzona Rafuna, Arbër "DJ Dagz" Gumnishta, Xheisara Frisku, Eltion Merja, Sarah Berisha, Antonela Berisha, Besiana "Big Mama" Kasami, Pajtim "DJ PM" Krasniqi, Sabian Medini, Semi Jaupaj, Kledi Hysa, Ardit Cuni and Elhaid Cufi

=== Season 2 (2023) ===
| No. overall | No. in season | Title | Day in house | Original release date |
|---|---|---|---|---|
| 20 | 1 | "Episode 1" | 16 | 8 January 2023 |
Special Guests: Enxhi Nasufi and Andi Vrapi. Family or Friends Guests: Eltona Hazizi (wife of housemate Gent Hazizi). Eliminated housemates: Ariana Plakiqi and Herion Mustafaraj.
| 21 | 2 | "Episode 2" | 23 | 15 January 2023 |
Special Guests: Aulona Musta and Lei Kraja. Family or Friends Guests: Niko Komani (friend of housemate Kiara Tito). Eliminated housemates: Mikela Pupa.
| 22 | 3 | "Episode 3" | 30 | 22 January 2023 |
Special Guests: Armina Mevlani and Neda Balluku. Family or Friends Guests: Migena (aunt of housemate Kiara Tito). Eliminated housemates: Ronaldo Sharka.
| 23 | 4 | "Episode 4" | 37 | 29 January 2023 |
Special Guests: Xenophon Ilia and Arbër Çepani. Family or Friends Guests: Maria (sister of housemate Tea Trifoni), Alberta (friend of housemate Dea Mishel Hoxha) and Artion Vreto (friend of housemate Xhonatan Islami). Eliminated housemates: Eni Tare.
| 24 | 5 | "Episode 5" | 44 | 5 February 2023 |
Special Guests: Beniada Jakic Nishani. Family or Friends Guests: Gerta Gixhari (sister of housemate Olta Gixhari). Eliminated housemates: Ifigjenia "Efi" Dhedhes and Xhonatan Islami.
| 25 | 6 | "Episode 6" | 51 | 12 February 2023 |
Special Guests: Antonela Berisha and Elona Duro. Family or Friends Guests: Shqipe Hysenaj (friend of housemate Bledi Mane), Frensi Danga (friend of housemate Keisi Medini) and Sedmir Selmani (friend of housemate Tan Brahimi). Eliminated housemates: Amos Zaharia and Tea Trifoni.
| 26 | 7 | "Episode 7" | 58 | 19 February 2023 |
Special Guests: Zefina Hasani and Julka Gramo. Family or Friends Guests: Robert Aliaj (father of housemate Krist Aliaj Dragot) and Elisa (daughter of Ermiona Lekbello). Eliminated housemates: Diola Dosti.
| 27 | 8 | "Episode 8" | 65 | 26 February 2023 |
Special Guests: Jonida Alickolli and Neda Balluku. Eliminated housemates: Bledi Mane and Pirro Beati.
| 28 | 9 | "Episode 9" | 72 | 5 March 2023 |
Special Guests: Enxhi Nasufi, Milaim Zeka, Meridian Ramçaj and Miranda Dupi. Eliminated housemates: Ermiona Lekbello and Tan Brahimi.
| 29 | 10 | "Episode 10" | 79 | 12 March 2023 |
Special Guests: Arjola Demiri, Mario Deda and Joni Ndoja. Family or Friends Guests: Beniada Jakic Nishani (friend of housemate Jori Delli), Adi Pojana (friend of housemate Qetsor Ferunaj) and Gerta Gixhari (sister of housemate Olta Gixhari). Eliminated housemates: Shpat Kerleshi.
| 30 | 11 | "Episode 11" | 86 | 19 March 2023 |
Special Guests: Aulona Musta and Meridian Ramçaj. Eliminated housemates: Armaldo Kllogjeri and Kejvina Kthella.
| 31 | 12 | "Episode 12" | 93 | 26 March 2023 |
Special Guests: Eni Shehu and Estela Ujka. Eliminated housemates: Kiara Tito and Ronaldo Sharka.
| 32 | 13 | "Episode 13" | 100 | 2 April 2023 |
Special Guests: Balina Bodinaku and Ina Kollcaku. Eliminated housemates: Olta Gixhari and Antoneta Koçi.
| 33 | 14 | "Episode 14" | 107 | 9 April 2023 |
Family or Friends Guests: Niko Komani (friend of housemate Kiara Tito), Xhoi Bare (friend of housemate Ifigjenia "Efi" Dhedhes) and Liesa Haxhiasllani (friend of housemate Kiara Tito). Eliminated housemates: Gerti Koxha and Lorenc Hasrama.
| 34 | 15 | "Episode 15" | 114 | 16 April 2023 |
Special Guests: Egli Haxhiraj and Aldor Nini. Family or Friends Guests: Jon Ndoja (friend of housemate Luiz Ejlli). Eliminated housemates: Keisi Medini.
| 35 | 16 | "Episode 16" | 121 | 23 April 2023 |
Special Guests: Monika Lubonja. Eliminated housemates: Elvis Pupa, Bledi Mane, Kiara Tito, Valbona Mema, Diola Dosti, Eni Tare, Gerti Koxha and Gent Hazizi.
| 36 | 17 | "Episode 17" | 128 | 30 April 2023 |
Eliminated housemates: Jori Delli, Nita Latifi and Qetsor Ferunaj.
| 37 | 18 | "Episode 18 - Finale" | 130 | 2 May 2023 |
Special Guests: Eni Shehu, Eduart Grishaj, Olsa Muhameti, Ilda Bejleri, Gerta Gixhari, Ina Kollcaku, Meridian Ramçaj, Flavio Qarri, Arbër Zeka, Arbër Çepani, Zefina Hasani and Ed Manushi. Family or Friends Guests: Bujar Hoxha (father of housemate Dea Mishel Hoxha) and Robert Aliaj Dragot (father of housemate Krist Aliaj Dragot). Eliminated housemates: Kiara Tito, Ronaldo Sharka, Nita Latifi, Gerti Koxha, Valbona Mema, Tea Trifoni, Mikela Pupa, Qetsor Ferunaj, Sabian Medini, Jori Delli, Keisi Medini, Lorenc Hasrama, Fotini Derxho and Eva Alikaj.

=== Season 3 (2024) ===
| No. overall | No. in season | Title | Day in house | Original release date |
|---|---|---|---|---|
| 38 | 1 | "Episode 1: "He hit him hard on the head"/ Exclusive statement for Ledjona's ex-husband!" | 9 | 21 January 2024 |
Special Guests: Rudina Dembacaj, Alexandra Kuci, Gerta Gixhari. Family or Friends Guests: Jonida Muka (friend of housemate Ledjona Xheladinaj), Niko Komani (friend of housemate Roza Lati), Kejsi Ujkashi (daughter of Gazmend Ujkashi). Eliminated housemates: Drini Zeqo
| 39 | 2 | "Episode 2: Heidi's uncle: Granddaughter feels for...! Alfio, a message to the ex-wife. Who will enter Big Brother in a thong?" | 16 | 28 January 2024 |
Special Guests: Ifigjenia "Efi" Dhedhes, Sonila Meço, Cubi Metkaj. Family or Friends Guests: Mustafa (uncle of housemate Heidi Baci). Eliminated housemates: Alfio Rrotani
| 40 | 3 | "Episode 3: Sara's ex-boyfriend in Big Brother VIP, the secrets are revealed! The sister confesses Erjola's anxiety" | 23 | 4 February 2024 |
| 41 | 4 | "Episode 4: Ilnisa's brother bites the 'pearl', Meri explodes after leaving Big Brother, rejects friendship" | 30 | 11 February 2024 |
| 42 | 5 | "Episode 5: "Sarah the bully", Bardhi's friends against the relationship! "They threatened my wife", shocked Endriku!" | 37 | 18 February 2024 |
| 43 | 6 | "Episode 6: Stress releases the strong statement for Meriton. A phone call interrupts the show!" | 44 | 25 February 2024 |
| 44 | 7 | "Episode 7: Two people in prison?! Meriton's brother does not forgive! The confrontation with tears between Gazi and Mario Deda" | 51 | 3 March 2024 |
| 45 | 8 | "Episode 8: Bardhi-Sara, behind the scenes of dating and abortion! Mother against Ilnisa's relationship" | 58 | 10 March 2024 |
| 46 | 9 | "Episode 9: Strong collision, Bardhi makes Silvi leave the studio. Find out who published the mother's photo" | 65 | 17 March 2024 |
| 47 | 10 | "Episode 10: Does Egla get a "cheap" salary? Ilnisa's brother destroys the director of the Theater. Heidi instigates the fight" | 72 | 24 March 2024 |
| 48 | 11 | "Episode 11: Donald breaks his silence after the wedding. Egla's disqualification interrupts the LIVE! The new resident is surprised" | 79 | 31 March 2024 |
| 49 | 12 | "Episode 12: Ilnisa tears up for Meriton, makes an unexpected statement: Egla must go to the finals!" | 86 | 7 April 2024 |
| 50 | 13 | "Episode 13: "Provocative! I know Heidi from outside"/ Two former housemates interrupt the LIVE!!" | 93 | 14 April 2024 |
| 51 | 14 | "Episode 14: Big Brother prediction table/ Guests & opinionists 'clash', Enxhi jumps to separate them!" | 100 | 21 April 2024 |
| 52 | 15 | "Episode 15: Inside the confession room - Heidi's statement about Romeo comes out! The parachutes in Big Brother VIP lead to...?!" | 107 | 28 April 2024 |
| 53 | 16 | "Episode 16: Heidi's mom gets sick after the surprise! Antonela breaks the bomb for Romeo and Erjola" | 114 | 5 May 2024 |
| 54 | 17 | "Episode 17: Exclusive/ Erjola and Roza confess after the exit, they "reveal" the couple Heidi - Romeo!" | 121 | 12 May 2024 |
| 55 | 18 | "Episode 18: Argument between the family members of the finalists! Donald: You brazen deserve to apologize to me!" | 128 | 19 May 2024 |

=== Season 4 (2025) ===
| No. overall | No. in season | Title | Day in house | Original release date |
|---|---|---|---|---|
| 56 | 1 | "Episode 1: The two new housemates of Big Brother VIP are revealed. Bernard's sister sparks debate!" | 16 | 5 January 2025 |
| 57 | 2 | "Episode 2: 'Phenomenon' Gjesti creates a clash in the studio. G-Bani fights with the police, here are the exclusive photos!" | 23 | 12 January 2025 |
| 58 | 3 | "Episode 3: "I never forgive her tears" - Rozana's sister goes on LIVE, gets into a fight with Amber & Ronaldo!" | 30 | 19 January 2025 |
| 59 | 4 | "Episode 4: Olta Gixhari interrupts the show, message for Gerta! Bernard's "Bomb": 3 Gay boys on Big Brother VIP" | 37 | 26 January 2025 |
| 60 | 5 | "Episode 5: Gjesti married?! Management reacts! Tied up outside? Valbona's sister confuses the studio" | 44 | 2 February 2025 |
| 61 | 6 | "Episode 6: Exclusive/ Xheneta breaks down in tears in the studio: I miss Gjesti! G-Bani speaks after being ejected" | 51 | 9 February 2025 |
| 62 | 7 | "Episode 7: Gjesti's friend addresses Diellza LIVE, and his sister talks about Egli. New details from Olta!" | 58 | 16 February 2025 |
| 63 | 8 | "Episode 8: Stresi "crucifies" Egli: Persecutor! His sister tells him everything. G-Bani's strong call!" | 65 | 23 February 2025 |
| 64 | 9 | "Episode 9: Why do they mention the knives to Gjesti? Leo & Lela speak! After the partner, Danja's sister also reacts!" | 72 | 2 March 2025 |
| 65 | 10 | "Episode 10: Gjesti's statement about Egli in the confession room is out! G-Bani & Amber, fierce clashes!" | 79 | 9 March 2025 |
| 66 | 11 | "Episode 11: Ilnisa explodes at Rozana: Washerwoman! BBV Psychology reveals Egli's plan" | 86 | 16 March 2025 |
| 67 | 12 | "Episode 12: Egli with Olsi, the same as with Gjesti? Their friend speaks! Jozi's father, two words about Loredana!" | 93 | 23 March 2025 |
| 68 | 13 | "Episode 13: Egli tied up? Brother-in-law speaks, Gjesti's parents apologize! Confrontation, Shqipe-Valbona" | 100 | 30 March 2025 |
| 69 | 14 | "Episode 14: "Kiss, ignorant", fierce clash between Aldo and Ronaldo! Danja's boyfriend reacts LIVE!" | 107 | 6 April 2025 |
| 70 | 15 | "Episode 15: Fan Club FINALE/ Egli, Rozana, Gjesti, Laerti; who deserves the victory?" | 116 | 15 April 2025 |
