= Atalanta Kërçyku =

Albanian TV host and beauty pageant titleholder (born 1992)

- Born: Atalanta Kërçyku; June 27, 1992 (age 34); Elbasan, Albania
- Education: Architecture
- Beauty pageant titleholder
- Hair color: Blonde

Atalanta Kërçyku (born June 27, 1992) is an Albanian television presenter and beauty pageant titleholder known for representing Albania in Miss World 2019, as well as hosting, writing, and starring in several Albanian television programs.

== Biography ==
Kërçyku was born in Elbasan, Albania, and is the first child of the Kërçyku family; she has a sister and a younger brother. Kërçyku studied architecture for five years. While she was a student, her journey into the world of showbiz began.

After a successful experience in beauty competitions, Atalanta was chosen by Albania to represent the country in Miss World 2019. After winning the crown of Miss World in Albania, she was classified in the top 42 in London, where the Miss World 2019 competition was held. Immediately after the experience in England, Kërçyku started her television career.

== Career ==
Kërçyku has been part of Albanian television for 10 years. With six Miss crowns and television experience, Kërçyku was invited to be a moderator of the most followed sports program, Procesi Sportiv, for Top Channel's 2020–2021 season. She hosted the program for a season. At the same time, she was invited to various television panels, where she talked more about life as a celebrity as well as the challenges of being one of the Albanian women with the most crowns won.

Furthermore, Kërçyku hosted E diell in 2021–2022. In 2022 she began a new role as a writer: beginning in December, she created and directed the program Politikan N'Tigan.

In October 2023, Kërçyku was selected to be one of the stars, as well as a contender, on Dancing with the Stars.
