= Big Brother VIP (Albanian TV series) season 1 =

Big Brother VIP
- Season 1
- Season 1 logo
- Hosted by: Arbana Osmani
- No. of days: 137
- No. of housemates: 30
- Winner: Ilir Shaqiri
- Runner-up: Donald Veshaj
- Companion shows: Big Brother VIP – Fans' Club; Post Big Brother VIP
- No. of episodes: 157

Release
- Original network: Top Channel
- Original release: 5 October 2021 – 18 February 2022

Season chronology
- Next → Season 2

Big Brother VIP 1 was the first season of Big Brother VIP, hosted by Arbana Osmani. The season began airing on 5 October 2021 on Top Channel, and ended after 137 days on 18 February 2022. The viewers can watch for the whole season live from the house in two live pay-per-view channels, with the name Big Brother VIP 1 and Big Brother VIP 2, which are available on Albanian TV platform DigitAlb. The two opinionists in the live evictions shows, were Arbër Hajdari and Balina Bodinaku.

Dojna Mema hosted the spin-off show Big Brother VIP – Fans' Club and Iva Tiço was the opinionist. One week after the final of the show, was broadcast a reunion show, with the name Post Big Brother VIP. The three episodes were broadcast on 22 February, 25 February and 1 March 2022. The show was hosted by Arbana Osmani, and the two opinionists were Arbër Hajdari and Balina Bodinaku.

The show was originally scheduled to last 100 days, with the finale on 11 January 2022. However, due to satisfactory ratings, the show was extended by over one month, making it the longest Albanian season overall, with 137 days.

On 18 February 2022, Ilir Shaqiri was announced as the winner of the season, having received 35% of the final vote, with Donald Veshaj as the runner-up after receiving 30%. Ilir Shaqiri won a €100,000 prize.

== Production ==
The celebrity version of the show was expected to start during the 2017–2018 television season. In 2019, Top Channel announced that Big Brother would come back for the 2019–2020 television season in Albania, but they didn't say if will be an original or a celebrity version. On 12 August 2021, Top Channel confirmed that the season would air in October 2021. On 30 September 2021, Top Channel announced that the show will begin airing on 5 October 2021.

=== Promotion ===
The first trailer of the show premiered on 29 January 2018 and read "...It's hard, being a VIP! They deserve to relax! And where is the VIP resort?! Big Brother Vip ... coming soon only on Top Channel." Top Channel released in August 2021, a trailer and read "We have been told that you miss him." and at the end of the trailer we hear Arbana Osmani telling "Returns soon to Top Channel.".

=== House ===
In the original version of Big Brother Albania, the house was located in different towns including Gërdec and Kashar. The celebrity version was filmed in Studio Nova in Tirana.

== Housemates ==
On Day 1, fourteen housemates entered the house during launch. As time went on, sixteen new people were introduced, making for a total of thirty housemates in the season.

DJ PM and DJ Dagz were eliminated on the 74th day, but Big Brother decided to open a televoting and the public would decide who'd come back in the Big Brother house. The public decided for DJ Dagz to come back and he reentered the house as a single player.

Igli Zarka, was forced to leave the house few days after he entered, on 8 November, due to health problems.

Fifi, also decided to leave the house, as she said she wasn't feeling good enough to keep on the game. It all started when she started to express her feelings towards Granit Cana, and he said to her that sees her as a sister. She had an emotional breakdown in the middle of the night and everyone claimed she had psychological problems. It was just the beginning, as she had a really harsh debate with the opinionist, Balina Bodinaku, on the Tuesday, 23 November live show. Balina claimed that Fifi wasn't a fan of Sarah Berisha and DJ PM's love, she was just seeking attention. Fifi said that it was a really hard count towards her, and she wasn't absolutely seeking attention. Bodinaku insisted on her own opinion, and Fifi asked to leave the house immediately. That's where she fainted and everyone panicked. She was ready to leave the house but after a lot of conversation in the diary room with the host, Arbana Osmani, Fifi decided to stay in the house and keep on the game. Two days later, she decided to leave the house by saying she needed to take care of herself.

Big Mama entered the house on Day 60. However, she left the Big Brother house on 24 December live show, after a very harsh debate with Antonela Berisha. Berisha claimed that she had offended her in Serbian. That's when Big Mama exploded and started insulting Berisha by saying she's immorale, shameless and dirty. Then Big Mama decided to leave the house.

On the evening of 27 January, Einxhel Shkira broke her arm while playing a game with other housemates. She was taken to hospital and had an operation, after which she returned to the house.

Celebrity	Age on entry	Notability	Day entered	Day exited	Status
Ilir Shaqiri	48	Dancer & Choreographer	1	137	Winner
Donald Veshaj	26	Actor	1	137	Runner-up
Einxhel Shkira	31	TV Host	22	99	3rd Place
Einxhel Shkira	31	TV Host	99	137	3rd Place
Beniada Jakic Nishani	29	Model	1	137	4th Place
Monika Lubonja	53	Actress	1	130	Evicted
Arjola Demiri	37	Actress	1	123	Evicted
Arjola Demiri	37	Actress	123	130	Evicted
Dritan "Tan" Brama	43	Choreographer	92	120	Evicted
Egzona Rafuna	29	TV Host & Journalist	92	116	Evicted
Arbër Sulstarova	26	Tennis player & economist	92	113	Evicted
Beatrix Ramosaj	27	Singer & model	22	109	Evicted
Arbër "DJ Dagz" Gumnishta	29	DJ	32	74	Evicted
Arbër "DJ Dagz" Gumnishta	29	DJ	74	106	Evicted
Xheisara Frisku	25	Singer	92	106	Evicted
Eltion Merja	36	Dancer & choreographer	92	102	Evicted
Meridian Ramçaj	37	Reality TV star	46	95	Evicted
Sarah Berisha	25	Influencer	22	92	Evicted
Antonela Berisha	25	Reality TV star	46	85	Evicted
Besiana "Big Mama" Kasami	35	Singer	60	81	Walked
Pajtim "DJ PM" Krasniqi	30	DJ	32	74	Evicted
Claudio Nika	25	Standup paddleboarder	60	71	Evicted
Sabian Medini	46	Singer	1	29	Evicted
Sabian Medini	46	Singer	29	67	Evicted
Valon Shehu	37	Singer	50	60	Evicted
Semi Jaupaj	28	Singer	1	53	Evicted
Filloreta "Fifi" Raçi	27	Singer	1	52	Walked
Kledi Hysa	37	Model & footballer	1	46	Evicted
Granit Cana	30	Footballer	1	39	Evicted
Igli Zarka	30	Actor	29	34	Walked
Ardit Cuni	25	Singer	1	18	Evicted
Ardit Cuni	25	Singer	18	32	Evicted
Rudina "Paloma" Demneri	35	Journalist	1	25	Evicted
Sheila Haxhiraj	27	Singer	1	25	Evicted
Elhaid Cufi	28	Writer	1	11	Evicted

== Nominations table ==
2-in-1 housemate called 'DJs', their nominations counted as one. (Week 5 - 10)

	Week 1	Week 2	Week 3		Week 4		Week 5	Week 6		Week 7		Week 8	Week 9		Week 10		Week 11			Week 12	Week 13		Week 14		Week 15			Week 16		Week 17		Week 18	Week 20 Final	
	Week 1	Week 2	Day 22	Day 25		Day 29	Week 5	Day 39	Day 43	Day 46	Day 50	Week 8	Day 60	Day 64	Day 67	Day 71	Day 74		Day 78	Week 12	Day 89	Day 92	Day 95	Day 99	Day 102	Day 106		Day 109	Day 113	Day 116	Day 120	Week 18	Week 20 Final	
Housemates’ Favorite	Arjola, Donald, Fifi, Ilir, Kledi	Ilir	Ilir	none				Kledi	none		Arjola	none																						
Viewers’ Favorite	Granit, Paloma	none	Donald	none		Fifi	none		Ilir, Sabian	Ilir	Beatrix, Beniada	Donald, Einxhel, Ilir	none	Einxhel	none	Ilir			DJ Dagz	Arjola	none		Donald	none					Beniada, Donald, Einxhel, Ilir	none				
Ilir	No; Nominations	Semi, Donald	Beniada, Semi	No; Nominations	No; Nominations	Einxhel, Semi	Fifi, Granit	Einxhel	Exempt	Sabian	No; Nominations	DJs, Meridian	Sabian	DJs, Sarah	DJs, Einxhel	No; Nominations	No; Nominations	No; Nominations	Donald	Nominated	DJ Dagz, Sarah	Nominated	Beatrix, DJ Dagz	Nominated	Arbër	Arjola	No; Nominations	Donald, Egzona	Egzona, Monika	Saved	Beniada, Einxhel	Exempt	Winner (Day 137)	
Donald	No; Nominations	Sheila, Paloma	Monika, Paloma	No; Nominations	No; Nominations	Ardit, Ilir	Ilir, Monika	Monika	Nominated	DJs	No; Nominations	Monika, Arjola	Beatrix	Antonela, Arjola	Arjola, Ilir	No; Nominations	No; Nominations	No; Nominations	Beniada	Sarah	Ilir, Meridian	Nominated	Einxhel, Ilir	No; Nominations	Saved	Tan	Nominated	Arbër, Einxhel	Arjola, Tan	Nominated	Arjola, Einxhel	Nominated	Runner-up (Day 137)	
Einxhel	Not in House			No; Nominations	No; Nominations	Ardit, Granit	Granit, Ilir	Ilir	Nominated	Nominated	Nominated	Meridian, Valon	Nominated	Arjola, Sabian	Arjola, Claudio	No; Nominations	No; Nominations	Saved	Meridian	Saved	Meridian, Monika	No; Nominations	Arjola, Monika	Evicted (Day 99)	DJ Dagz	Nominated	Nominated	Egzona, Tan	Egzona, Tan	Beniada	Arjola, Monika	Nominated	Third place (Day 137)	
Beniada	No; Nominations	Granit, Sheila	Granit, Monika	No; Nominations	No; Nominations	Granit, Monika	Granit, Monika	Ilir	Nominated	Nominated	No; Nominations	Monika, Valon	Saved	Antonela, Sabian	Claudio, Monika	No; Nominations	No; Nominations	Saved	Ilir	Donald	Donald, Ilir	No; Nominations	Ilir, Monika	No; Nominations	Einxhel	Saved	No; Nominations	Arbër, Tan	Monika, Tan	Arjola	Arjola, Monika	Exempt	Fourth place (Day 137)	
Monika	No; Nominations	Beniada, Sheila	Kledi, Semi	No; Nominations	No; Nominations	Beniada, Donald	Beniada, Donald	Beniada	No; Nominations	Semi	No; Nominations	Beniada, Meridian	Arjola	DJs, Sarah	Beniada, Claudio	No; Nominations	No; Nominations	Saved	Beniada	Beatrix	Beniada, Sarah	No; Nominations	Beniada, Einxhel	No; Nominations	Ilir	Beniada	No; Nominations	Arbër, Egzona	Egzona, Tan	Ilir	Beniada, Einxhel	Nominated	Evicted (Day 130)	
Arjola	No; Nominations	Ardit, Granit	Ardit, Beniada	No; Nominations	No; Nominations	Granit, Semi	Granit, Sarah	Sarah	No; Nominations	Monika	No; Nominations	Antonela, Valon	Ilir	Antonela, Sarah	Claudio, Einxhel	No; Nominations	No; Nominations	Saved	Donald	Monika	Einxhel, Sarah	No; Nominations	Beniada, Einxhel	No; Nominations	Monika	Monika	No; Nominations	Arbër, Tan	Egzona, Tan	Monika	Beniada, Einxhel	Nominated	Re-Evicted (Day 130)	
Tan	Not in House																					Exempt	DJ Dagz, Einxhel	No; Nominations	Nominated	Arbër	No; Nominations	Beniada, Einxhel	Arjola, Egzona	Nominated	Evicted (Day 120)			
Egzona	Not in House																					Exempt	Beniada, Ilir	No; Nominations	Nominated	Donald	No; Nominations	Arbër, Tan	Arjola, Tan	Evicted (Day 116)				
Arbër	Not in House																					Exempt	DJ Dagz, Einxhel	Nominated	Beniada	Ilir	No; Nominations	No; Nominations	Evicted (Day 113)					
Beatrix	Not in House			No; Nominations	No; Nominations	Ardit, Granit	Einxhel, Granit	Beniada	Nominated	Nominated	No; Nominations	Meridian, Valon	DJs	Antonela, Arjola	Arjola, Claudio	No; Nominations	No; Nominations	Saved	Ilir	Beniada	Ilir, Sarah	No; Nominations	Beniada, Ilir	No; Nominations	Donald	Egzona	Nominated	Evicted (Day 109)						
DJ Dagz	Not in House						Exempt	Ilir	Nominated	Sarah	No; Nominations	Antonela, Valon	Sarah	Antonela, Sabian	Claudio, Ilir	No; Nominations	Returned	Nominated	Ilir	Einxhel	Ilir, Monika	No; Nominations	Ilir, Monika	No; Nominations	Beatrix	Nominated	Re-Evicted (Day 106)							
Xheisara	Not in House																					Exempt	DJ Dagz, Einxhel	No; Nominations	Nominated	Evicted (Day 106)								
Eltion	Not in House																					Exempt	DJ Dagz, Einxhel	Nominated	Evicted (Day 102)									
Meridian	Not in House									Exempt	Exempt	Monika, Sarah	Nominated	Antonela, Sabian	Beatrix, Donald	No; Nominations	No; Nominations	Saved	Donald	Nominated	Einxhel, Sarah	Nominated	Evicted (Day 95)											
Sarah	Not in House			No; Nominations	No; Nominations	Ardit, Granit	Granit, Sabian	Arjola	Nominated	Saved	No; Nominations	Antonela, Valon	Beniada	Antonela, Sabian	Arjola, Ilir	No; Nominations	No; Nominations	Saved	Meridian	DJ Dagz	Arjola, Ilir	Evicted (Day 92)												
Antonela	Not in House									Exempt	Exempt	Arjola, Valon	Monika	Sabian, Sarah	Donald, Ilir	No; Nominations	No; Nominations	Nominated	Meridian	Nominated	Evicted (Day 85)													
Big Mama	Not in House												Exempt	Exempt	Beatrix, Einxhel	No; Nominations	No; Nominations	Saved	Beatrix	Walked (Day 81)														
DJ PM	Not in House						Exempt	Ilir	Nominated	Sarah	No; Nominations	Antonela, Valon	Sarah	Antonela, Sabian	Claudio, Ilir	No; Nominations	Evicted (Day 74)																	
Claudio	Not in House												Exempt	Exempt	Ilir, Monika	Evicted (Day 71)																		
Sabian	No; Nominations	Donald, Semi	Beniada, Semi	No; Nominations	No; Nominations	Einxhel, Sarah	Einxhel, Sarah	Einxhel	Exempt	Fifi	No; Nominations	Beniada, DJs	Donald	DJs, Sarah	Re-Evicted (Day 67)																			
Valon	Not in House										Exempt	Antonela, Beniada	Evicted (Day 60)																					
Semi	No; Nominations	Ardit, Paloma	Monika, Paloma	No; Nominations	No; Nominations	Ardit, Monika	Granit, Sarah	Monika	Nominated	Donald	No; Nominations	Evicted (Day 53)																						
Fifi	No; Nominations	Beniada, Semi	Beniada, Semi	No; Nominations	No; Nominations	Donald, Sarah	Ilir, Sarah	Arjola	Nominated	Arjola	No; Nominations	Walked (Day 52)																						
Kledi	No; Nominations	Ardit, Paloma	Fifi, Monika	No; Nominations	No; Nominations	Ilir, Monika	Monika, Sabian	Sarah	Nominated	Evicted (Day 46)																								
Granit	No; Nominations	Beniada, Paloma	Ardit, Beniada	No; Nominations	No; Nominations	Donald, Ilir	Sarah, Semi	Evicted (Day 39)																										
Igli	Not in House					Exempt	Exempt	Walked (Day 34)																										
Ardit	No; Nominations	Paloma, Semi	Kledi, Semi	No; Nominations	No; Nominations	Donald, Granit	Re-Evicted (Day 32)																											
Paloma	No; Nominations	Donald, Semi	Kledi, Semi	No; Nominations	Evicted (Day 25)																													
Sheila	No; Nominations	Granit, Semi	Granit, Paloma	Evicted (Day 25)																														
Elhaid	No; Nominations	Evicted (Day 11)																																
Notes	1	2, 3	4	5	5, 6	7	none	8, 9, 10	11	12, 10	13	14	15, 16	17	18	19, 20	21	22, 16	23, 24	25	none	26	27, 28	29, 20, 28	30	31	32	33, 34	35	36	37, 38, 39	40, 41	42	
Nominated (pre-veto)	none																				Ilir, Sarah	none	DJ Dagz, Einxhel, Ilir	none	Egzona, Tan, Xheisara	none			Egzona, Tan	none				
Veto winner	none																				Ilir	none	Donald	none	Arjola	none			Einxhel	none				
Against public vote	Ardit, Beniada, Elhaid, Sabian, Sheila	Ardit, Kledi, Paloma, Semi	Beniada, Semi, Sheila	All housemates	All housemates	Ardit, Donald, ~~Granit~~	Granit, Ilir, Monika, Sarah	Beniada, Einxhel, Ilir, Sabian	Beatrix, Beniada, DJs, Donald, Einxhel, Fifi, Kledi, Sarah, Semi	Beatrix, Beniada, Einxhel	Einxhel, ~~Fifi~~, Semi	Antonela, Beniada, Meridian, Monika, Valon	Einxhel, Meridian	Antonela, Meridian, Sabian	Arjola, Claudio, Einxhel, Ilir	Antonela, Arjola, Beatrix, Beniada, Big Mama, DJs, Donald, Einxhel, Monika, Sarah	DJ Dagz, DJ PM	Antonela, DJ Dagz	Antonela, Arjola, Big Mama, Donald, Einxhel, Ilir, Meridian, Monika, Sarah	Antonela, Ilir, Meridian	DJ Dagz, Sarah	Donald, Ilir, Meridian	DJ Dagz, Einxhel, Ilir	Arbër, Eltion, Ilir	Egzona, Tan, Xheisara	DJ Dagz, Einxhel	Beatrix, Donald, Einxhel	Arbër, Monika	Egzona, Tan	Donald, Tan	Arjola, Beniada, Donald, Einxhel	Arjola, Donald, Einxhel, Monika	Beniada, Donald, Einxhel, Ilir	
Walked	none						Igli	none			Fifi	none							Big Mama	none														
Evicted	Elhaid; Most votes to evict	Ardit; Most votes to evict	Sheila; Most votes to evict	Paloma; Most votes to evict	Sabian; Most votes to evict	Ardit; Most votes to evict	Granit; Most votes to evict	Ilir, Sabian; Most votes to be immune	Kledi; Most votes to evict	Beatrix, Beniada; Most votes to be immune	Semi; Most votes to evict	Valon; Most votes to evict	Einxhel; Most votes to be immune	Sabian; Most votes to evict	Claudio; Most votes to evict	DJs; Fewest votes to save	DJ Dagz; Most votes to return	DJ Dagz; Most votes to be immune	Eviction cancelled	Antonela; Most votes to evict	Sarah; Most votes to evict	Meridian; Most votes to evict	Einxhel; Most votes to evict	Eltion; Fewest votes to save	Xheisara; Fewest votes to save	DJ Dagz; Most votes to evict	Beatrix; Most votes to evict	Arbër; Most votes to evict	Egzona; Most votes to evict	Tan; Fewest votes to save	Arjola; Fewest votes to save	Donald, Einxhel; Most votes to be finalist	Beniada; 10% (out of 4)	Einxhel; 25% (out of 3)
Evicted	Elhaid; Most votes to evict	Ardit; Most votes to evict	Sheila; Most votes to evict	Paloma; Most votes to evict	Sabian; Most votes to evict	Ardit; Most votes to evict	Granit; Most votes to evict	Ilir, Sabian; Most votes to be immune	Kledi; Most votes to evict	Einxhel; Fewest votes to be immune	Semi; Most votes to evict	Valon; Most votes to evict	Meridian; Fewest votes to be immune	Sabian; Most votes to evict	Claudio; Most votes to evict	DJs; Fewest votes to save	DJ Dagz; Most votes to return	DJ Dagz; Most votes to be immune	Eviction cancelled	Antonela; Most votes to evict	Sarah; Most votes to evict	Meridian; Most votes to evict	Einxhel; Most votes to evict	Eltion; Fewest votes to save	Xheisara; Fewest votes to save	DJ Dagz; Most votes to evict	Beatrix; Most votes to evict	Arbër; Most votes to evict	Egzona; Most votes to evict	Tan; Fewest votes to save	Arjola; Fewest votes to save	Arjola, Monika; Fewest votes to be finalist	Donald; 30% (out of 2)	Ilir; 35% to win

=== Notes ===
- ^Note 1: On Day 4, all housemates voted for their top three favourite people. The five housemates with the most votes were given immunity from the first public vote. They were Arjola, Donald, Fifi, Ilir and Kledi. During the second live show, the two Opinionists were also given the opportunity to give immunity to two housemates of their choosing. Balina chose Semi and Arbër chose Monika. Furthermore, Granit and Paloma were given also immunity through a public vote. Ardit, Beniada, Elhaid, Sabian and Sheila did not win immunity and were thus nominated for eviction.
- ^Note 2: Ilir was given immunity for the week and the power to send two housemates of his choice against public vote, though he could not choose a housemate he had already nominated. He chose Ardit and Kledi to face the public vote along with Paloma and Semi, who received the most nominations.
- ^Note 3: Ardit received the most votes to evict, but won the chance to return to the game. At the end of the live eviction show, he re-entered the house.
- ^Note 4: The viewers voted for their favourite housemate, with the one with the most votes receiving immunity and the one with the least votes being automatically nominated for eviction. Donald received the most votes, whilst Sheila received the least votes.
- ^Note 5: Due to the housemates breaking the rules, Big Brother decided all housemates would be up for elimination.
- ^Note 6: Sabian received the most votes to evict, but won the chance to return to the game. At the end of the live eviction show, he re-entered the house.
- ^Note 7: After being voted as the viewers’ favourite housemate, Fifi was given the right to save one of the nominated housemates (Ardit or Granit) from eviction, and replace them with another housemate of her choice. She chose to save Granit, and replaced him with Donald.
- ^Note 8: On Day 36, the housemates were split into duos and the game was played in the sixth week in pairs. The pairs were: Arjola and Kledi, Donald and Semi, Beniada and Einxhel, Ilir and Sabian, Fifi and Sarah, Beatrix and Monika, and DJ Dagz & DJ PM and Granit.
- ^Note 9: On Day 39, the nominations in pairs were done, but before them Granit was eliminated and therefore DJ Dagz & DJ PM were not anymore in a duo. The housemates in pairs nominated one housemate, and then automatically his/her pair was nominated as well. Beniada and Einxhel had the most votes as a pair and were chosen to face the public vote. DJ Dagz & DJ PM, as the single housemate, had the power to send one housemate of their choice against the public vote. They choose Ilir, and by default his pair Sabian also became nominated.
- ^Note 10: The public voted to save rather than to evict for the two housemates with the most votes to receive immunity for the next nominations.
- ^Note 11: As a punishment for breaking the rules, Beatrix, Beniada, DJ Dagz & DJ PM, Donald, Einxhel, Fifi, Kledi, Sarah and Semi were automatically nominated for eviction.
- ^Note 12: Each housemate had to save another contestant through a saving chain. Ilir began to choose as he was the favorite housemate by the viewers. Beatrix, Beniada and Einxhel were the last housemates standing as they were not saved, and thus became the nominees.
- ^Note 13: Einxhel received the fewest votes to be saved. The nominations were then left up to a public vote. Antonela, Beatrix, Beniada and Meridian were exempt from this vote. Fifi and Semi received the most votes on the night so they joined Einxhel against the public vote on Day 50.
- ^Note 14: On Day 57, the viewers voted for their three favorite housemates to receive immunity. The housemates with the most votes were Donald, Einxhel and Ilir.
- ^Note 15: Each housemate had to save another contestant through a saving chain. Antonela began to choose as she was the least favorite housemate amongst them. Einxhel and Meridian were the last housemates standing as they were not saved, and thus became the nominees.
- ^Note 16: The public voted to save rather than to evict and the housemate with the most votes received immunity for the next nominations.
- ^Note 17: Meridian received the fewest votes to be saved. The nominations were then left up to a public vote. Big Mama and Claudio were exempt from this vote, as they were the new housemates, and Einxhel was also exempt from it as she was the Viewers’ Favourite of the House. Antonela, Arjola, DJ Dagz & DJ PM, Sabian and Sarah had the fewest votes and then all the other housemates could vote for them.
- ^Note 18: The viewers voted for their favourite two housemates on the official Instagram page of Big Brother Albania VIP. The two housemates chosen were Donald and Ilir. They had the power to send two other contestants of their choice against the public vote. Donald chose Arjola and Ilir chose Einxhel to be nominated besides with Claudio and Ilir, who received the most nominations.
- ^Note 19: Big Brother gave the power to Meridian to choose between two things: to meet his favorite team and send all housemates against the public vote, without him and Ilir, who was the Viewers’ Favourite of the House and had immunity, or none of them. He chose to meet his team and sent all housemates up for eviction.
- ^Note 20: The viewers voted to save rather than to evict.
- ^Note 21: On Day 74, DJ Dagz & DJ PM had the fewest votes to save and were eliminated, but then Big Brother gave the chance to the viewers to vote for who from the two they wanted to return to the game. DJ Dagz received the most votes and returned to the house.
- ^Note 22: Ilir, as the Viewers’ Favourite of the House, was the house captain and had to also choose a second captain. He chose Donald, who also received immunity. Big Brother gave them the power to save four housemate each, with the last two housemates standing being sent against the public vote. Donald saved Arjola, Beniada, Einxhel and Meridian. Ilir saved Beatrix, Big Mama, Monika and Sarah.
- ^Note 23: As a punishment for breaking the rules, Antonela, Arjola, Big Mama, Einxhel, Monika and Sarah were automatically nominated for eviction.
- ^Note 24: During the live eviction show, Big Mama decided to leave the house and the eviction was cancelled, with no one being evicted.
- ^Note 25: Each housemate had to save another contestant through a saving chain. Arjola began to choose as she was the favorite housemate by the viewers. Antonela, Ilir and Meridian were the last housemates standing as they were not saved, and thus became the nominees.
- ^Note 26: Big Brother gave the power to Donald to send three housemates against the public vote, which could also include himself. He chose to put himself, Ilir and Meridian up for eviction.
- ^Note 27: Arbër, Egzona, Elton, Tan and Xheisara had immunity, because where the new housemates and also Donald had immunity, because was the viewers’ favourite of the House and had won the power of veto.
- ^Note 28: Einxhel was evicted by the public, but she was revealed to have picked the Return Ticket, therefore she went back into the House, skipping the nomination round.
- ^Note 29: Big Brother gave the power to Ilir to send three housemates against the public vote, which could also include himself. He chose to put himself, Arbër and Eltion up for eviction.
- ^Note 30: Each housemate had to save another contestant through a saving chain. Arjola began to choose as she had won a game, the previous day. She had also won the power of veto. Egzona, Tan and Xheisara were the last housemates standing as they were not saved, and thus became the nominees.
- ^Note 31: Each housemate had to save another contestant through a saving chain. Beatrix began to choose as she had won a game. DJ Dagz and Einxhel were the last housemates standing as they were not saved, and thus became the nominees.
- ^Note 32: Big Brother gave the power to Arbër to send three housemates against the public vote and he would have immunity for the next week. He chose to put Beatrix, Donald and Einxhel up for eviction.
- ^Note 33: Monika was nominated, due to losing in a game.
- ^Note 34: Arbër lost the immunity and he was not allowed to vote, due to breaking the rules of the game.
- ^Note 35: On Day 113, the viewers voted for their favorite housemate and the four housemates, with the most votes, would have immunity and also the housemate with the most votes, would have the power of veto. The housemate with the most votes was Einxhel and the other three housemates where Beniada, Donald and Ilir.
- ^Note 36: Each housemate had to save another contestant through a saving chain. Einxhel began to choose. Donald and Tan were the last housemates standing as they were not saved, and thus became the nominees.
- ^Note 37: As a punishment for breaking the rules, Donald was automatically nominated for eviction.
- ^Note 38: On Day 120, the viewers voted for the first finalist. Ilir had the most votes and went in the final.
- ^Note 39: Arjola was evicted by the public, but she was revealed to have picked the Return Ticket, therefore she went back into the House.
- ^Note 40: On Week 18, the viewers voted for the second finalist, between Beniada and Monika. Beniada had the most votes and went in the final.
- ^Note 41: The viewers voted between Arjola, Donald, Einxhel and Monika. The two housemates with the most votes, would be the third and fourth finalists and the two housemates with the least votes, would be eliminated.
- ^Note 42: At the final round, the public voted for the winner.

== Nominations totals received ==
2-in-1 housemate called 'DJs', their nominations counted as one. (Week 5 - 10)

	Week 1	Week 2	Week 3		Week 4		Week 5	Week 6		Week 7		Week 8	Week 9		Week 10		Week 11			Week 12	Week 13		Week 14		Week 15			Week 16		Week 17		Week 18	Week 20 Final	Total
Ilir	–	–	–	–	–	3	3	1	–	–	–	–	–	–	5	–	–	–	3	–	5	–	5	–	–	–	–	0	–	–	–	–	Winner	26
Donald	–	3	–	–	–	4	1	0	–	–	–	–	–	–	2	–	–	–	3	–	1	–	–	–	–	–	–	1	–	–	–	–	Runner-up	15
Einxhel	Not in House			–	–	2	2	2	–	–	–	–	–	–	3	–	–	–	–	–	2	–	7	Evicted	–	–	–	2	–	–	4	–	Third place	24
Beniada	–	3	5	–	–	1	1	2	–	–	–	3	–	–	1	–	–	–	2	–	1	–	4	–	–	–	–	1	–	–	3	–	Fourth place	27
Monika	–	0	4	–	–	3	3	1	–	–	–	3	–	–	2	–	–	–	–	–	2	–	3	–	–	–	–	–	2	–	2	–	Evicted	25
Arjola	–	0	0	–	–	0	0	1	–	–	–	2	–	3	4	–	–	–	–	–	1	–	1	–	–	–	–	0	3	–	3	–	Re-Evicted	18
Tan	Not in House																					–	–	–	–	–	–	4	6	–	Evicted			10
Egzona	Not in House																					–	–	–	–	–	–	3	5	Evicted				8
Arbër	Not in House																					–	–	–	–	–	–	5	Evicted					5
Beatrix	Not in House			–	–	0	0	1	–	–	–	0	–	–	2	–	–	–	1	–	0	–	1	–	–	–	–	Evicted						5
DJ Dagz	Not in House						–	0	–	–	–	2	–	3	1	–	–	–	–	–	1	–	5	–	–	–	Re-Evicted							12
Xheisara	Not in House																					–	–	–	–	Evicted								0
Eltion	Not in House																					–	–	–	Evicted									0
Meridian	Not in House									–	–	4	–	–	0	–	–	–	3	–	2	–	Evicted											9
Sarah	Not in House			–	–	2	5	1	–	–	–	1	–	5	0	–	–	–	–	–	5	Evicted												19
Antonela	Not in House									–	–	4	–	7	0	–	–	–	–	–	Evicted													11
Big Mama	Not in House												–	–	0	–	–	–	–	Walked														0
DJ PM	Not in House						–	0	–	–	–	2	–	3	1	–	Evicted																	6
Claudio	Not in House												–	–	6	Evicted																		6
Sabian	–	0	0	–	–	0	2	1	–	–	–	0	–	6	Re-Evicted																			9
Valon	Not in House										–	7	Evicted																					7
Semi	–	6	6	–	–	2	1	0	–	–	–	Evicted																						15
Fifi	–	0	1	–	–	–	1	1	–	–	–	Walked																						3
Kledi	–	0	3	–	–	0	0	1	–	Evicted																								4
Granit	–	3	2	–	–	6	7	Evicted																										18
Igli	Not in House					–	–	Walked																										0
Ardit	–	3	2	–	–	5	Re-Evicted																											10
Paloma	–	5	3	–	Evicted																													8
Sheila	–	3	–	Evicted																														3
Elhaid	–	Evicted																																0

== Reception ==
Big Brother Albania is known as the most popular Reality Television Show in Albania. Big Brother VIP also became very popular, few weeks after its premiere. This was reflected on the price businesses had to pay to promote their activity. So, in 2021-2022 television season, Big Brother VIP became the most expensive show to advertise. Thus, one second before the reality show starts broadcasting costs 5700 lek, and during the broadcast, 11,000 ALL.

The third among the most expensive are again two shows related to Big Brother VIP; the first is Big Brother VIP Daily Summary and the second Big Brother VIP – Fans' Club, where every second during the broadcast is paid 4600 ALL.

The finale was the most watched programme in the Albanian TV history.

Albania's prime minister, Edi Rama, posted a video from Valbona with Fifi's song "Diell", which was composed inside the Big Brother VIP's house. This song became the most popular at the month of publishing.
