= Sara Hoxha =

Albanian media executive and television producer (born 1996)

- Born: 18 January 1996 (age 30); Rome, Italy
- Occupations: Media executive; television producer
- Employer: Top Media Group
- Spouse: Ledion Liço (m. 2018)
- Children: 3
- Parents: Dritan Hoxha (father); Vjollca Hoxha (mother)
- Relatives: Lori Hoxha (sister); Redia Hoxha (sister); Itan Hoxha (brother)

Sara Hoxha (born 18 January 1996) is an Albanian media executive and television executive producer. She serves as an executive producer for several Top Channel productions, including Big Brother VIP Albania and Dancing With the Stars Albania.

== Early life ==
Hoxha was born on 18 January 1996 in Rome, Italy. She is the daughter of Dritan Hoxha, the founder of Top Media Group, and Vjollca Hoxha. She has three siblings: sisters Lori and Redia, and a brother, Itan.

== Career ==
=== Television production ===
Hoxha has established a career in television production within Top Channel. She is best known for her role as the executive producer of the reality television series Big Brother VIP Albania. She has also served as a producer for other entertainment shows, including the Albanian edition of Dancing with the Stars.

=== Business activities ===
As a member of the Hoxha family, Sara is a shareholder in several companies under the Top Media umbrella. Together with her mother and siblings, she holds ownership stakes in Top Channel, the coffee production company Lori Caffe, and other ventures associated with the group.

== Personal life ==
Hoxha resides in Tirana. She is married to the television presenter and producer Ledion Liço. The couple has three children.
