= Arjan Konomi =

Albanian Journalist

- Born: 19 February 1969 (age 57); Vlora, PR Albania
- Occupations: Television Opinionist, Writer and Journalist
- Known for: Official commentator for Për'puthen and Big Brother Albania
- Political party: Lëvizja Shqipëria Bëhet

Arjan Konomi (born 19 February 1969) is an Albanian television opinionist, writer, journalist and political activist. He is known as the official commentator in the reality television shows Për'puthen, Big Brother and Big Brother VIP – Fans' Club (season 5), on the national television Top Channel.

Konomi served as Public Relations Advisor and Spokesperson for the former president of Albania Alfred Moisiu who led the nation from 2002 to 2007.

== Early life and education ==
Konomi was born in the city of Vlorë, where he completed primary and secondary education. He later proceeded to University of Perugia where he studied at the Faculty of Political Science.

== Career ==
Konomi began his media career while still a student at the University of Perugia. He was known for his analytical skills in the field of international politics. He was chosen to collaborate as a student with the LIMES Magazine in the field of geopolitics in Italy and Europe, published by L'Espresso Editorial Group. His first publication on geopolitics in Albania dates back to 1997. He thereafter started a long-term cooperation with LIMES Magazine.

Konomi publishes a considerable number of geopolitical writings and studies on the Southwest Balkans, with a main focus on Albania, North Macedonia, Kosovo and the Former Yugoslavia, dealing mainly with the issue of the rights of Albanians, as well as the relations between the Balkan countries in different periods. His writings and interviews have influenced the informing of the Italian public opinion on this problematic area of Europe.

Konomi was later elected to the prestigious position of Member of the Editorial Board of Limes Magazine, which he still holds today. He features as an expert on Balkan geopolitical issues on Italian television, alongside notable academics and politicians. He features on the Italian state television RAI 2, in the political show Pinnocchio directed by Gad Lerner.

Konomi stood out in debates with ministers, government and opposition politicians, during the period of NATO bombings against the Former Republic of Yugoslavia.

Konomi became widely known after the publication in June 1998 of the political reportage, where for the first time it was written about the activity and future of the Kosovo Liberation Army, known as KLA, published in several languages. His media activity in Italy includes a number of conferences in numerous institutions, universities and organizations such as in Florence, Rome, Trento, Trieste, Naples, Livorno, Perugia, making him one of the most sought-after analysts on the issues of the Southwest Balkans. He featured in various Italian Radios, such as Radio Rai, Radio Radicale, and others as a geopolitics expert.

In 2002, Konomi returned to Albania with the election of the President of the Republic, Alfred Moisiu, who engaged him to serve as his Public Relations Advisor and Spokesperson. Konomic works as a media manager in the press industry. He serves as the editor-in-chief of Spektër Magazine and Shqip Magazine.

In 2020, Konomi returned to television by participating as an official commentator in the reality show Për'puthen on the national television Top Channel.

== Publications ==
Konomi has published two books in the biography category :

- Saga e Jetëve Lejendë 1 (Saras 2017; Papyrus 2019)
- Saga e Jetëve Lejendë 2 (Papirus 2020), published several times,

== See also ==
- Për'puthen
- Big Brother (Albanian season 2)
- Big Brother (Albanian season 6)
- Big Brother (Albanian season 7)
