= Arbër Hajdari =

Albanian philanthropist and entrepreneur (born 1994)

- Born: 16 February 1994 (age 32); Tirana, Albania
- Education: Luarasi University
- Occupations: Philanthropist; Entrepreneur
- Spouse: Vlera Devolli (m. 2022)
- Children: 1
- Parent: Shkëlqim Hajdari

Arbër Hajdari (born 16 February 1994) is the founder of the humanitarian organisation Fundjavë Ndryshe, which operates in Albania.

== Early life and education ==
Hajdari was born on 16 February 1994 in Tirana, Albania. He is the son of Shkëlqim Hajdari. He studied at Luarasi University.

== Philanthropy ==
In December 2015, Hajdari founded Fundjavë Ndryshe, a non-profit organisation that provides assistance to individuals and families.

The organisation has carried out activities following the 2019 Albania earthquake.

== Awards and honours ==
- 2021 – "Mother Teresa" decoration awarded by the former President of Albania, Bujar Nishani.
- 2022 – Named "Qytetar Nderi" (Honorary Citizen) by the municipality of Elbasan.
- 2023 – Named "Qytetar Nderi" (Honorary Citizen) of Malësia e Gjakovës by the Municipality of Tropojë.
- 2025 – Named "Qytetar Nderi" (Honorary Citizen) by the municipality of Dibër e Madhe.

== Media appearances ==
Hajdari has served as an opinionist on the Albanian reality television show Big Brother VIP Albania across multiple seasons.

== Personal life ==
Hajdari married Vlera Devolli in 2022. The couple have one child.
