= My Music (TV channel) =

Albanian television channel

- Logo for My Music
- Country: Albania
- Network: DigitAlb
- Headquarters: Tirana, Albania

Programming
- Language: Albanian
- Picture format: 576i (SDTV 16:9)

Ownership
- Owner: Top Media

History
- Launched: 2004
- Founder: Dritan Hoxha

Links
- Website: www.digitalb.al

Availability

Terrestrial
- DigitAlb: Albania

Streaming media
- My Music Radio: Albania

My Music is an Albanian music television channel, part of DigitAlb. It transmits free to air on satellite in Europe via Eutelsat, and in terrestrial and cable in Albania.

The station My Music Radio broadcasts My Music on radios around Albania, on the radio frequency 97.3 on the FM band.
