= Ledion Liço =

Albanian television presenter (born 1986)

- Born: June 13, 1986 (age 40); Leskovik, PSR Albania
- Education: University of Arts, Tirana; European University of Tirana
- Occupations: Presenter; producer; singer
- Years active: 2005–present
- Employers: Top Channel; Top Albania Radio
- Known for: Host of Big Brother VIP
- Title: Art and innovation director of Top Channel
- Spouse: Sara Hoxha (m. 2018)
- Children: 3

Ledion Liço (Albanian: [lɛˈdiɔn ˈlitʃɔ]; born June 13, 1986) is an Albanian television presenter, film producer and former singer. He is known as the host of several popular TV shows on Top Channel and Top Albania Radio, most notably Big Brother VIP Albania (from season 3 onward) and The Voice of Albania. Since 2020, he has served as the art and innovation director of Top Channel and executive director at Top Albania Radio and Top Channel Films.

== Career ==
Liço began his career in 2005, hosting programs such as the morning program Wake Up and the summer program Shtojzovallet. Some of his entertainment and musical television projects are: Top Fest (2007–2016), Top Music Awards and Unplugged (2006–2008), also The Voice of Albania (2011–2017) and The Voice Kids Albania (2016–2018), where he also served as an executive producer.

In 2015, Liço substituted the long-time Big Brother Albania host Arbana Osmani to host the reality show's 8th season while she was on maternity leave. He wasn't seen in television for multiple subsequent years, although he was rumored to have been in charge of developing MelodyTV, DigitAlb's recently launched music entertainment channel. He returned to the screen in 2024 to host the third season of Big Brother VIP Albania, permanently replacing Osmani and followed by confirmation for season four. Liço has also worked on various music-focused programs, such as A.Live.Night (2022) and Heineken Sessions.

== Filmography ==
=== Television ===
- Ethet e së Premtes Mbrëma (2002) – contestant
- Wake Up – host, producer
- Shtojzovallet (2005) – host
- Top Fest (2007–2016) – host, participant (2008)
- Unplugged (2006–2008) – host
- The Voice of Albania (2011–2017) – host
- The Voice Kids Albania (2016–2018) – host, executive Producer
- Top Music Awards (2016) – host
- Dancing with the Stars (2022–2023) - executive producer
- Big Brother Albania 8 (2015) – host
- Big Brother VIP Albania (2024–present) – host
- A.Live.Night (2022) – producer

=== Film ===
- Një dado për babin (2012–2013) – actor
- Within Love (Në kuadër të dashurisë) (2023) – producer

== Radio ==
- Wake Up – producer
- Heineken Sessions (2015) – producer

== Discography ==
=== Singles ===
- "Dance mo vlla" (2008)
- "Yes" (2015)
- "With or Without You" (2015)

== Personal life ==
Liço is married to Sara Hoxha, one of the co-owners of the Top Media Group — Top Channel's parent company — and the daughter of its late founder Dritan Hoxha. and now raise a family of three children.

== See also ==
- Big Brother Albania
- Big Brother VIP Albania
- Top Channel
