= Dancing with the Stars (Albanian TV series) =

- Genre: Reality competition
- Based on: Strictly Come Dancing
- Presented by: Alketa Vejsiu; Amarda Toska; Genti Zotaj; Ermal Mamaqi; Armina Mevlani; Jonida Maliqi; Drini Zeqo; Rudi Hizmo; Mateo Cela; Almeda Abazi; Bora Zemani; Eno Popi
- Judges: Ilir Shaqiri; Iva Tiço; Arian Çani; Alfred Kaçinari; Ema Andrea; Milaim Zeka; Armand Peza; Dalina Buzi; Kledi Kadiu; Valbona Selimllari; Lori Bala; Olta Gixhari
- Country of origin: Albania
- Original language: Albanian
- No. of seasons: 9
- No. of episodes: 118

Production
- Executive producers: Sara Hoxha (2022–2023); Ledion Liço (2022–2023)
- Production companies: BBC Worldwide; Vizion Plus (2010–2018); Tring (2010–2018); Top Channel (2022–2023)

Original release
- Network: Vizion Plus
- Release: 18 February 2010 – 8 June 2018
- Network: Top Channel
- Release: 7 October 2022 – 29 December 2023

Dancing with the Stars is an Albanian dance competition television series that premiered on 18 February 2010 on Vizion Plus and Tring Digital. It is the Albanian version of the British reality TV competition Strictly Come Dancing and is part of the Dancing with the Stars franchise. The show pairs celebrities with professional dancers. Each couple performs predetermined dances and competes against the others for judges' points and audience votes. The couple receiving the lowest combined total of judges' points and audience votes is eliminated each week until only the champion dance pair remains.

The show aired until 8 June 2018 on Vizion Plus and Tring Digital. On 10 June 2022, it was announced that beginning with the 8th season, Dancing with the Stars would move from Vizion Plus to Top Channel. On 7 October 2022 it began airing the eighth season. On the final of the eighth season, it was announced that the ninth season will begin airing very soon on Top Channel, with the season premiering on 6 October 2023. In September 2024, the executive producer Sara Hoxha announced that the show would be on hiatus for the 2024-2025 television season.

== Format ==
The show pairs a number of celebrities with professional dancers who each week compete against each other in a competition to impress a panel of judges and the viewing public in order to survive potential elimination. Through a telephone poll, viewers vote who should stay, the results of the poll being combined with the ranking of the panel of judges. Couple with lowest number points drop out from each episode. Each judge gives the performance a mark out of ten, giving an overall total out of thirty/forty.

== Presenters and judges ==
=== Presenter timeline ===
Color key

Host	Co-host

Cast member	Seasons								
Cast member	1	2	3	4	5	6	7	8	9
Alketa Vejsiu									
Amarda Toska									
Armina Mevlani									
Almeda Abazi									
Bora Zemani									
Genti Zotaj									
Ermal Mamaqi									
Jonida Maliqi									
Drini Zeqo									
Rudi Hizmo									
Mateo Cela									
Eno Popi									

=== Judges timeline ===
Color key

Main Judge	Contestant	Professional dancer

Cast member	Seasons								
Cast member	1	2	3	4	5	6	7	8	9
Ilir Shaqiri									
Iva Tiço									
Arian Çani									
Alfred Kaçinari									
Ema Andrea									
Milaim Zeka									
Julian Deda									
Armand Peza									
Dalina Buzi									
Kledi Kadiu									
Valbona Selimllari									
Lori Bala									
Olta Gixhari									

== Series overview ==
Series	Contestants	Episodes	Originally released			Winners	Runners-up	Third place
Series	Contestants	Episodes	First released	Last released	Network	Winners	Runners-up	Third place
1	12	9	18 February 2010	7 May 2010	Vizion Plus	Oni Pustina & Linda Poda	Genta Ismajli & Dion Gjinika	Roland Hysi & Lori Bala
2	12	12	31 March 2011	16 June 2011	Vizion Plus	Enver Petrovci & Lori Bala	Çiljeta Xhilaga & Dion Gjinika	Shpat Kasapi & Isida Mollaymeri
3	14	22	16 January 2012	29 March 2012	Vizion Plus	Elvana Gjata & Gerdi Vaso	Vedat Ademi & Odeta Dishnica	Inida Gjata & Simone Pigliacelli; Ornela Bregu & Dion Gjinika
4	12	12	5 November 2013	21 January 2014	Vizion Plus	Lori Hoxha & Dion Gjinika	Flaka Krelani & Eltojn	Aulona Musta & Gerd Vaso; Arjon & Ermira
5	13	12	24 November 2014	9 February 2015	Vizion Plus	Tuna & Simone Pigliacelli	Amos Zaharia & Adela; Evi & Andrea	Kristi & Ermira
6	12	12	15 October 2015	31 December 2015	Vizion Plus	Dorina Mema & Besi	Florian & Lori Bala	Ambra & Jurgen
7	12	12	23 March 2018	8 June 2018	Vizion Plus	Soni Malaj & Dion Gjinika	Aulona Musta & Graciano Tagani	Amos Zaharia & Isida Mollaymeri
8	14	14	7 October 2022	1 January 2023	Top Channel	Sara Hoxha & Luixhino Hala	Megi Pojani & Jurgen Bala	Elhaida Dani & Ledian Agallijaj Ardit Çuni & Jora Hodo
9	15	13	6 October 2023	29 December 2023	Top Channel	Enxhi Nasufi & Silvester Shuta	Sardi Strugaj & Erisa Govaci	Arnita Beqiraj & Eni Balla; Fifi & Graciano Tagani
