= Big Brother Albania season 7 =

Season of an Albanian television series

Big Brother Albania
- Season 7
- Presented by: Arbana Osmani
- No. of days: 99
- No. of housemates: 24
- Winner: Nevila Omeri
- Runner-up: Jona Kalemaj

Release
- Original network: Top Channel
- Original release: February 21 – May 30, 2014

Season chronology
- ← Previous; Season 6 Next → Season 8

Big Brother Albania 7 was the seventh season of the Albanian series of the worldwide franchise of Big Brother. It was based upon the Dutch series of the same name, which gained popularity in 1999 and 2000. It started on February 21, 2014, on Top Channel and ended after ninety-nine days on May 30, 2014. The main host was Arbana Osmani, who returned for the seventh season in a row. The live eviction show this year moved to Fridays at 21:00 CET, while the Daily Recap show aired every day of the week in different schedules, also including a weekly recap on Sundays. Ledion Liço was rumored to be the host of the spin-off show Big Brother Albania Fans' Club thus replacing Albana Osmani, but however in last minute changes, Albana Osmani returned for the third season in a row. The Fans' Club show featured dialogues with eliminated contestants and fans of the show. Liço started hosting a new spin-off series that started airing during the season, called Jashtë Bigut, which was part of the Sunday marathon of E Diell on the same network. Armand Peza took over for the second time, the role of the panelist. Peza had also been a panelist on only the first season of Big Brother Albania.

Like all of the previous seasons, two 24/7 live PPV channels were made available on DigitAlb since the start of the show. The winner received 15,000,000 lekë (€100,000). The House changed location and was built from scratch near Gërdec, Albania with a similar architecture and format as last year's one.

This season of Big Brother Albania brought a lot of controversy to the show, mainly thanks to the careless remarks made by the housemates and their disputable thoughts. One of the most discussed topic was the sexual orientation of most of the housemates, which became a rising topic inside and out of the House. Different magazines and newspapers were alleging on the housemates sexual preferences using also photos and information from their lives as evidences. During the season, another controversy was that of the racial comments. The seventh season of Big Brother Albania, in spite of small difficulties in the start, managed to set in great ratings and become the second most-watched show in Albania. The season finale for this year set an all-time record with the highest rating for a Big Brother Albania season finale ever. Like all the previous seasons, this season created a lot of buzz in the Albanian show business. Every story from the House went on to make headlines in magazines and newspapers.

Nevila Omeri was the winner of this season being so the second female to win Big Brother in Albania. Jona Kalemaj finished as the runner-up of the season and Valer Kolnikaj finished third, leaving the other finalists behind. It is the first time in the Big Brother Albania history that the final duo was made up by two female housemates. Omeri's win was alleged to be fixed by the producers of the show, and it brought a lot of controversy. Kalemaj, the runner-up also showed her daze over Omeri's win, minutes after the finale ended. During the Reunion episode, Meridian, Jona and Valer publicly expressed their shock and disappointment on Nevila being the winner. The panelist, Armand Peza stood on Omeri's side while Ardit and Juliana were the only housemates that thought Nevila deserved to win. Past housemates also expressed their thoughts and said they either saw Jona or Valer win this season, but not Nevila just because of her always tending to avoid fights and arguments and using her story to make people feel sorry about her

== Production ==
=== Development ===
When the sixth season of Big Brother Albania ended, Top Channel released a statement saying that the sixth season would be the last of the series in Albania. Two months later, Arbana Osmani said in an interview for Albanian magazine Anabel that Big Brother would be taking a break from the 2013–14 season to return in 2015 with the seventh season. Osmani also said that she was focusing more on the Albanian version of MasterChef, that then, was rumored to start in January. However, MasterChef Albania was postponed and was set to start on March 8, 2014 with no host at all. During November, the Albanian television news portal IMA Albania posted an exclusive news saying that Big Brother Albania would return with a seventh season in February 2014. The news was later confirmed by trusted sources inside Top Channel. The production team of Big Brother Albania had to undergo some series of changes after last year's viewership drop. First it was announced that four-year signature executive producer Rezart Aga wouldn't be returning and Zefina Hasani was going to replace him. Hasani at the time was also executive producing Dancing with the Stars and expressed her wish to return to the crew of Big Brother Albania during a live television interview. Edi Oga, game show personality, was also hired to be the author of the games and the weekly tasks this year. When the show started he was confirmed to be one of the producers of the show. Arjan Konomi left the chair of the panelist eight hours before the season premiere and season one co-panelist, Armand Peza, replaced him. The night of the live show was also moved from Saturdays to Fridays at 21:00 CET to give Big Brother a longer-lasting time slot.

Before the seventh season began the producers of the series promised a lot of changes and a return to the basic format of Big Brother. They also promised a reduced number of housemates, unlike any other season. However, these changes were dismissed as soon as the second live show and the third one brought in some of the worst ratings for this show in many years. As for the number of housemates, the seventh season ranks third with twenty-four housemates, only behind season five's twenty-five and season four's twenty-six housemates.

=== Sponsorship ===
As soon as the sixth season of this reality show ended, there were rumors that AMC, which had been sponsoring Big Brother since its beginning was dropping from the position held before, leaving so the reality show without general sponsors at all. The rumors were denied a lot of times until it was officially announced that AMC had left Big Brother for good. The great concern was if the producers and Top Channel were going to afford their plans on a new home and stage for the show. When the seventh season started it was revealed that SIGAL Uniqa Group Austria was replacing AMC as the general sponsor of the reality show. However, part of the show were made more than nine official sponsors which helped on designing the House and constructing it.

=== Commercials ===
Being one of the most-watched shows in Albania, Big Brother is widely known for the high commercial cost. The biggest change in the fees was made during season six and since then it has changed with only a 5% increase for the seventh season. The highest commercial cost is for the Fridays live shows which measures up to 4,410 Leks per second and 132,300 Leks per thirty seconds for commercials before the live show stars and 7,800 Leks per second and 234,000 Leks per thirty seconds for commercials during the live show breaks. High commercial costs apply also for the spin-off shows; Big Brother Albania Fans' Club requires 1,400 Leks per second and 42,000 Leks per thirty seconds for commercials before the show starts, 1,600 Leks per second and 48,000 Leks per thirty seconds for commercials during the show breaks, and 2,400 Leks per second and 72,000 leks per thirty seconds for commercials after the show ends.

Because of the ratings expected to be really high for the season premiere there was a flux of commercials before the first live show started. The number of commercials shown was planned to be 25 but ended up being more than 68 commercials by more than 52 companies. SIGAL Uniqa Group Austria had their commercial repeated five times. This also affected the live show to begin with forty-five minutes delay and caused a lot of displease on the fans and the viewers. A delay was also noticed after the first commercial break during the live show. A lot of critics started making fun of the happening. Anabel, an Albanian magazine posted on their Facebook page what a fan wrote to them saying: "I had time to shower, dry my hair, pet my dog, play some video games, talk to my grandmother, and when I came back to see they were still showing commercials". A parody sketch aired on Portokalli addressing the show's delay.

== House ==
The House of Big Brother Albania is always one of the most discussed topics before the according season starts. The seventh season was no exception as rumors and different speculations spread in newspapers and magazines. This season's House is a lot similar to the House of the sixth season as to the interior architecture. It represents an oriental theme with a lot of different and unique accessories used inside and out of the House. Different from every season, this year the building had dark, eccentric and feverish colors. The use of very sharp and bright-colored furniture was also noticed. Different letters were painted on the walls and it was later revealed that the letters would be part of a mission for the housemates. The House was not well received by fans and critics who claimed to have been disappointed. Fatma Haxhialliu, a famous Albanian blogger, expressed her lack of amazement but praised the designers of the House for giving it a more original look and for making it seem less spacious. Other critics slammed the designers for not changing the plan of the rooms in the House and for not including new and more interesting rooms. The location for this season moved from Kashar, Tirana back to season one's building in Gërdec which had been destroyed since the Gërdec explosion back in 2008.

== Format ==
=== Short format changes ===
Like every other season of Big Brother in Albania, the seventh season was no exception regarding to the basic format of evictions and nominations which is based on the Big Brother basic format. However, there were some really small changes for the game of the housemates that were going to enter the House on the first day. When the first live show kicked off all the housemates were in the Big Brother Albania stage and the male housemates were randomly paired with the female housemates, according to the different adjectives each of the male housemates chose to describe their "perfect woman". After all the male housemates were paired there were only three female housemates that were left with no partner: Ardijana, Esida and Juliana, so they entered the game playing as a single housemate. While the other housemates were paired as follows: Ardit with Violeta, Enkelejd with Matilda, Fatjon with Daniela, Meridian with Mikela, Valer with Nevila, Rigels with Jona, Ervin with Andia and Erald with Esterina, the female housemates who entered as a single one were given a mission by Big Brother to split the couples and make them fight. Andia decided to walk from the House and leave the show only five minutes after her entrance. Ervin who was paired with Andia was now left a single housemate and according to the rules he had to be ejected. The following live show Big Brother asked each of the single female housemates for the name of the couple they thought they had split. Ardijana said Valer, Esida said Erald and Juliana said Fatjon. Each of the mentioned male housemates entered the Diary Room and were asked if they wanted to "trade" their current partner with either of the single female housemates, so Valer was asked if we wanted to change Nevila for Ardijana, Erald was asked if he wanted to change Esterina for Esida and Fatjon was asked if he wanted to change Daniela for Juliana. From all the three male housemates only Erald accepted to change his partner. Ardijana and Juliana were both put up for eviction for failing to accomplish their task, meanwhile the newly single housemate Esterina was also put up on the block along with the other girls for failing to keep the pairing.

==== Dismissal ====
After a lot of negative responses from the public, the game and from critics of the show, the game in pairs was dismissed shortly after the fourth week. Even the housemates did not like the game in pairs as they publicly expressed their frustration with the new format. The game in pairs was allegedly made to help the secret of the marriage of Matilda and Fatjon and make the housemates more connected to each other. Critics blamed the producers for forcing the making of a showmance in the House.

=== Finale format change ===
This year the finale was organized in a different kind of way. Unlike any other season the lines weren't open for the finalists so the public could not vote to decide on the winner; so during the week of the finale there was no public televote. On the finale night it was introduced to the public a new way of deciding on the winner of the season. It was decided that according to certain dynamics, chemistry and relationships between the housemates, selected housemates would be facing the public vote in couples. The first couple were Ardit and Valer. They were both asked if they wanted to face the public vote together and they both accepted. If one of the housemates would not accept to face the public vote with certain housemates then they could pick a letter from a box with the name of a housemate in it. Firstly the lines were open for Valer and Ardit. The public had to decide on who should be going on the final round. The winner of the first televote was Valer so he was automatically the first finalist. The second couple were Juliana and Jona and they also accepted to face the public vote together; which decided for Jona to go towards the final round alongside Valer. The last couple were Nevila and Meridian and in the end Nevila won the most votes to join Jona and Valer as the three ultimate finalists. This new finale format was well-received from fans of the show.

== Housemates ==
Housemates	Age	Entered	Exited	Status
Nevila Omeri	20	Day 1	Day 99	Winner
Jona Kalemaj	28	Day 1	Day 99	Runner-Up
Valer Kolnikaj	28	Day 1	Day 99	Third Place
Meridian	30	Day 1	Day 99	Fourth Place
Juliana	23	Day 1	Day 99	Fifth Place
Ardit	26	Day 1	Day 99	Sixth Place
Visar		Day 29	Day 92	Evicted
Mikela	38	Day 1	Day 92	Evicted
Enkelejd	29	Day 1	Day 85	Evicted
Lori		Day 29	Day 78	Evicted
Matilda	24	Day 1	Day 71	Evicted
Katerina		Day 29	Day 64	Evicted
Fatjon	28	Day 1	Day 57	Evicted
Myrteza		Day 29	Day 50	Evicted
Donald	28	Day 29	Day 50	Walked
Violeta	30	Day 1	Day 43	Evicted
Esida	25	Day 1	Day 43	Evicted
Rigels	28	Day 1	Day 36	Evicted
Esterina	20	Day 1	Day 29	Evicted
Erald	24	Day 1	Day 22	Evicted
Daniela	28	Day 1	Day 15	Evicted
Ardijana	34	Day 1	Day 8	Evicted
Ervin	27	Day 1	Day 1	Ejected
Andia	24	Day 1	Day 1	Walked

== Reception ==
=== Controversy & criticism ===
A lot of racial comments were made during this season because for the first time in the history of Big Brother in Albania a Romani woman, Esterina, entered the house. Erald was one of the housemates that started making comments about how Esterina's clothes stank and also made comments about her skin color. Later on the game Meridian started telling Esterina that she shouldn't have entered the Big Brother house because she wasn't a very smart person, a comment that caused a fight between the two housemates. Osmani, the host of the show, addressed these bigoted remarks on a television interview and also during the live show of March 7, 2014. She also talked to the housemates about them. The panelist of the show, Armand Peza also criticized Meridian and Erald for their racial slur and their racist jokes towards Esterina and other housemates. The comments were brought up again later on the show during the night Esterina was evicted as she expressed her feelings on the derogatory comments made towards her. She added that the racist remarks were the only reason she wanted to enter the Big Brother house and also said that she wanted to prove everyone wrong about Romani people. During Week 5, Rigels called Ardit's face "very black".

Another controversy this season was the use of physical assault and violence from the housemates. Jona expressed her feelings since Week 1 about Rigels and said she didn't want to have been paired with him to play the game. As a pair, Jona and Rigels had a lot of fights but their relationship reached a boiling point during Week 4, when Jona, furious that Rigles had eaten all her french fries, threatened to stab him with a knife, while holding the object in her hand and making several attempts to do so. While this was happening, none of the other housemates, who were watching the whole scene, attempted to stop Jona or grab the knife from her hand. Jona was then called to the Diary Room by the production team and she apologized publicly about her actions and said she had been in the heat of the moment and didn't have the nerves to put up with Rigels's games as she had not eaten for days. During the live show of March 14, 2014, Armand Peza, the panelist criticized Jona's actions and said she had still to make an apology to Rigels, but Rigels said that they had already settled into an agreement that would be the best for both. Other housemates such as Mikela, Violeta and Ardit were surprised that Jona wasn't ejected. Violeta then pointed out that Rigels was "the luckiest person" because Jona was seriously aiming to stab him.

=== Viewing figures ===
The first live premiere show for the seventh season of Big Brother Albania aired on February 21, 2014; it averaged 681,433 viewers and achieved a 34.8% share, which was slightly down from last year's season premiere's ratings. In this season was also set an all-time low peak for a season premiere's ratings of Big Brother Albania. Lots of critics blamed the schedule change from Saturdays to Fridays stating that: "Big Brother Albania [now had to compete] against Zonë e Lirë. However this season premiere did better than Zonë e Lirë which averaged 576,909 viewers. Then again, the ratings on May 23, 2014 of the live show showed a total win of the reality show over the rival channel TV Klan which was broadcasting Zonë e Lirë. During the third live show, Big Brother Albania lost a lot of viewers and set a new season low to date. On March 21, 2014 live show, Big Brother had a spike in ratings due to new entrances in the House. Afterwards the live shows' ratings reached a constant point similar to other seasons' ratings. The reason why Big Brother this year was always ranked in second place in the weekly rank of ratings is thought to be because of the high ratings every Champions League match has in the rival channel TV Klan. The weird thing this year with the ratings was said to be the fact that the live show of Friday, May 8 got higher ratings than the season premiere. This thing was called a "ratings' disorder".

This year's finale is the highest-rated episode of Big Brother in Albania for the last two years. It is also the highest-rated and most watched finale in all of the Big Brother Albania history with a record share percentage and a record number of viewers.

Despite all the fluctuations in the ratings, according to TELEMETRIX SH.A. and Monitor, Big Brother Albania is the second most-watched show on Top Channel and the second most-watched show overall in Albania. It is also the most-watched reality TV Show, thanks to the great popularity it has gained during the years among all Albanians. In spite of the fact that Big Brother Albania is currently on its seventh season, it still have great popularity with an average share of 55.55% and an average rating of 27.26, which are also far better for the critics' expectations.

Ratings for the Live Shows
Air date	Share	Viewers	Weekly rank
Friday, February 21	34.8%	681 433	1
Friday, February 28	32.1%	619 590	2
Friday, March 7	27.6%	577 788	4
Friday, March 14	31.1%	600 997	2
Friday, March 21	39.0%	684 551	1
Friday, March 28	37.6%	652 554	2
Friday, April 4	38.2%	612 426	2
Friday, April 11	32.5%	571 156	5
Friday, April 18	34.5%	630 252	1
Friday, April 25	35.9%	635 646	1
Friday, May 2	32.3%	633 143	1
Friday, May 9	38.4%	696 531	1
Friday, May 16	36.7%	682 545	1
Friday, May 23	38.1%	699 358	1
Friday, May 30	78.6%	1 436 842	1
Friday, June 6 (Reunion)	80.4%	1 846 442	1

== Nominations Table ==
	Week 1	Week 2	Week 3	Week 4	Week 5	Week 6		Week 7	Week 8	Week 9	Week 10	Week 11	Week 12	Week 13		Week 14 - Final		
	Week 1	Week 2	Week 3	Week 4	Week 5	Day 36	Day 43	Week 7	Week 8	Week 9	Week 10	Week 11	Week 12	Day 85	Day 92	Round One	Round Two	
Nevila	No; Nominations	Meridian	Ardit	Not eligible	Mikela, Meridian	Not eligible	Valer	Valer, Myrteza	Valer, Matilda	Mikela, Valer	Meridian, Mikela	Valer, Jona	Meridian, Juliana	Meridian, Valer	Juliana, Valer	Nominated	Winner (Day 99)	
Jona	No; Nominations	Esida	Ardit	Not eligible	Violeta, Enkelejd	Not eligible	Not eligible	Myrteza, Enkelejd	Katerina, Lori	Katerina, Nevila	Ardit, Enkelejd	Lori, Juliana	Visar, Mikela	Ardit, Valer	Valer, Jona	Nominated	Runner-Up (Day 99)	
Valer	No; Nominations	Meridian	Not eligible	Not eligible	Mikela, Meridian	Nevila	Not eligible	Ardit, Juliana	Katerina, Juliana	Ardit, Katerina	Meridian, Ardit	Lori, Juliana	Visar, Jona	Juliana, Mikela	Visar, Meridian	Nominated	Third Place (Day 99)	
Meridian	No; Nominations	Ardit	Not eligible	Esterina, Ardit, Nevila	Rigels, Ardit	Mikela	Ardit, Katerina, Nevila	Katerina, Ardit	Valer, Fatjon	Katerina, Ardit	Valer, Enkelejd	Visar, Valer	Nevila, Juliana	Nevila, Mikela	Juliana, Ardit	Nominated	Evicted (Day 99)	
Juliana	Nominated	Jona	Ardit	Esterina, Violeta, Enkelejd	Violeta, Meridian	Not eligible	Not eligible	Valer, Lori	Jona, Matilda	Jona, Matilda	Matilda, Jona	Jona, Valer	Nevila, Ardit	Valer, Visar	Nevila, Visar	Nominated	Evicted (Day 99)	
Ardit	No; Nominations	Esida	Not eligible	Not eligible	Enkelejd, Violeta	Nevila	Violeta	Enkelejd, Valer	Matilda, Fatjon	Visar, Valer	Matilda, Valer	Valer, Meridian	Juliana, Nevila	Jona, Mikela	Juliana, Meridian	Nominated	Evicted (Day 99)	
Visar	Not in House				Exempt	Nevila	Not eligible	Valer, Fatjon	Fatjon, Ardit	Katerina, Nevila	Ardit, Meridian	Juliana, Ardit	Jona, Enkelejd	Juliana, Nevila	Ardit, Nevila	Evicted (Day 92)		
Mikela	No; Nominations	Ardit	Enkelejd	Not eligible	Jona, Rigels	Not eligible	Not eligible	Enkelejd, Ardit	Lori, Katerina	Katerina, Lori	Enkelejd, Ardit	Ardit, Valer	Visar, Jona	Ardit, Valer	Evicted (Day 92)			
Enkelejd	No; Nominations	Mikela	Not eligible	Not eligible	Jona, Matilda	Violeta	Not eligible	Ardit, Mikela	Fatjon, Ardit	Ardit, Meridian	Meridian, Ardit	Valer, Jona	Mikela, Valer	Evicted (Day 85)				
Lori	Not in House				Exempt	Not eligible	Not eligible	Myrteza, Donald	Matilda, Fatjon	Matilda, Mikela	Jona, Matilda	Jona, Valer	Evicted (Day 78)					
Matilda	No; Nominations	Mikela	Fatjon	Esida, Enkelejd, Violeta	Rigels, Valer	Not eligible	Not eligible	Katerina, Myrteza	Katerina, Lori	Nevila, Mikela	Juliana, Enkelejd	Evicted (Day 71)						
Katerina	Not in House				Exempt	Not eligible	Valer	Valer, Enkelejd	Matilda, Fatjon	Jona, Mikela	Evicted (Day 64)							
Fatjon	No; Nominations	Mikela	Not eligible	Violeta, Mikela, Esida	Violeta, Rigels	Matilda	Not eligible	Myrteza, Enkelejd	Ardit, Katerina	Evicted (Day 57)								
Myrteza	Not in House				Exempt	Violeta	Not eligible	Ardit, Matilda	Evicted (Day 50)									
Donald	Not in House				Exempt	Mikela	Not eligible	Valer, Lori	Walked (Day 50)									
Violeta	No; Nominations	Esida	Enkelejd	Not eligible	Jona, Juliana	Not eligible	Not eligible	Evicted (Day 43)										
Esida	No; Nominations	Fatjon	Meridian	Not eligible	Rigels, Ardit	Not eligible	Evicted (Day 43)											
Rigels	No; Nominations	Esida	Not eligible	Not eligible	Matilda, Esida	Evicted (Day 36)												
Esterina	Nominated	Erald	Fatjon	Not eligible	Evicted (Day 29)													
Erald	No; Nominations	Fatjon	Not eligible	Evicted (Day 22)														
Daniela	No; Nominations	Mikela	Evicted (Day 15)															
Ardijana	Nominated	Evicted (Day 8)																
Ervin	Ejected (Day 1)																	
Andia	Walked (Day 1)																	
Notes	1, 2, 3	4, 5, 6	7, 8	9, 10	11	12, 13	14	none	15	none			16	17	18, 19	20	21	
Up for eviction	Ardijana, Esterina, Juliana	Ardit, Violeta, Daniela, Fatjon, Erald, Esida, Jona, Rigels, Meridian, Mikela	Enkelejd, Erald, Fatjon, Meridian, Rigels, Valer	Enkelejd, Esida, Esterina, Violeta	Jona, Meridian, Rigels, Violeta	Esida, Jona, Juliana, Katerina, Lori, Matilda	Valer, Violeta	Ardit, Enkelejd, Myrteza, Valer	Ardit, Fatjon, Katerina, Lori, Matilda	Ardit, Katerina, Mikela, Nevila	Ardit, Enkelejd, Matilda, Meridian	Ardit, Jona, Juliana, Lori, Valer	Ardit, Enkelejd, Jona, Juliana, Meridian, Mikela, Nevila, Valer, Visar	Mikela, Valer	Ardit, Juliana, Meridian, Nevila, Valer, Visar	Ardit, Valer	Jona, Nevila, Valer	
Up for eviction	Ardijana, Esterina, Juliana	Ardit, Violeta, Daniela, Fatjon, Erald, Esida, Jona, Rigels, Meridian, Mikela	Enkelejd, Erald, Fatjon, Meridian, Rigels, Valer	Enkelejd, Esida, Esterina, Violeta	Jona, Meridian, Rigels, Violeta	Esida, Jona, Juliana, Katerina, Lori, Matilda	Valer, Violeta	Ardit, Enkelejd, Myrteza, Valer	Ardit, Fatjon, Katerina, Lori, Matilda	Ardit, Katerina, Mikela, Nevila	Ardit, Enkelejd, Matilda, Meridian	Ardit, Jona, Juliana, Lori, Valer	Ardit, Enkelejd, Jona, Juliana, Meridian, Mikela, Nevila, Valer, Visar	Mikela, Valer	Ardit, Juliana, Meridian, Nevila, Valer, Visar	Jona, Juliana	Jona, Nevila, Valer	
Up for eviction	Ardijana, Esterina, Juliana	Ardit, Violeta, Daniela, Fatjon, Erald, Esida, Jona, Rigels, Meridian, Mikela	Enkelejd, Erald, Fatjon, Meridian, Rigels, Valer	Enkelejd, Esida, Esterina, Violeta	Jona, Meridian, Rigels, Violeta	Esida, Jona, Juliana, Katerina, Lori, Matilda	Valer, Violeta	Ardit, Enkelejd, Myrteza, Valer	Ardit, Fatjon, Katerina, Lori, Matilda	Ardit, Katerina, Mikela, Nevila	Ardit, Enkelejd, Matilda, Meridian	Ardit, Jona, Juliana, Lori, Valer	Ardit, Enkelejd, Jona, Juliana, Meridian, Mikela, Nevila, Valer, Visar	Mikela, Valer	Ardit, Juliana, Meridian, Nevila, Valer, Visar	Meridian, Nevila	Jona, Nevila, Valer	
Walked	Andia	none						Donald	none									
Ejected	Ervin	none																
Evicted	Ardijana; Most votes to evict	Daniela; Most votes to evict	Erald; Most votes to evict	Esterina; Most votes to evict	Rigels; Most votes to evict	Esida; Most votes to evict	Violeta; Most votes to evict	Myrteza; Most votes to evict	Fatjon; Most votes to evict	Katerina; Most votes to evict	Matilda; Most votes to evict	Lori; Most votes to evict	Enkelejd; Most votes to evict	Mikela; Most votes to evict	Visar; Most votes to evict	Ardit; Most votes to evict	Valer; Fewest votes (out of 3)	Jona; Fewest votes (out of 2)
Evicted	Ardijana; Most votes to evict	Daniela; Most votes to evict	Erald; Most votes to evict	Esterina; Most votes to evict	Rigels; Most votes to evict	Esida; Most votes to evict	Violeta; Most votes to evict	Myrteza; Most votes to evict	Fatjon; Most votes to evict	Katerina; Most votes to evict	Matilda; Most votes to evict	Lori; Most votes to evict	Enkelejd; Most votes to evict	Mikela; Most votes to evict	Visar; Most votes to evict	Juliana; Most votes to evict	Valer; Fewest votes (out of 3)	Jona; Fewest votes (out of 2)
Evicted	Ardijana; Most votes to evict	Daniela; Most votes to evict	Erald; Most votes to evict	Esterina; Most votes to evict	Rigels; Most votes to evict	Esida; Most votes to evict	Violeta; Most votes to evict	Myrteza; Most votes to evict	Fatjon; Most votes to evict	Katerina; Most votes to evict	Matilda; Most votes to evict	Lori; Most votes to evict	Enkelejd; Most votes to evict	Mikela; Most votes to evict	Visar; Most votes to evict	Juliana; Most votes to evict	Nevila; Most votes to win	
Evicted	Ardijana; Most votes to evict	Daniela; Most votes to evict	Erald; Most votes to evict	Esterina; Most votes to evict	Rigels; Most votes to evict	Esida; Most votes to evict	Violeta; Most votes to evict	Myrteza; Most votes to evict	Fatjon; Most votes to evict	Katerina; Most votes to evict	Matilda; Most votes to evict	Lori; Most votes to evict	Enkelejd; Most votes to evict	Mikela; Most votes to evict	Visar; Most votes to evict	Meridian; Most votes to evict	Nevila; Most votes to win	

- Immune from nomination

=== Notes ===
- ^Note 1: During the launch, the housemates discovered that they were entering the House as 8 couples. The first 3 housemates to enter were Ardijana, Esida and Juliana, who were competing as a single housemate. Then the 8 pairs were revealed (Andia & Ervin, Ardit & Violeta, Daniela & Fatjon, Enkelejd & Matilda, Erald & Esterina, Jona & Rigels, Meridian & Mikela and Nevila & Valer). As of Week 4, the game was not played in pairs anymore.
- ^Note 2: During the launch, Andia decided to leave the House only a few minutes she arrived to the House, because her mother was ill and she wanted to be with her. As Ervin was her partner, he had to leave the House too.
- ^Note 3: The 3 girls without a partner had to choose one guy, and if that guy decided to change his current partner, there would be a new pair, but if not, the girl would be automatically nominated. Ardijana chose Valer, Esida chose Erald and Juliana chose Fatjon. Only Erald decided to change his partner (Esterina to Esida), so Ardijana, Esterina and Juliana were up for eviction.
- ^Note 4: The housemates nominated one other housemate as a pair, but in the end the total of each pair is added, and the pairs with the most nominations are up for eviction. Esterina and Juliana are the only ones who compete as singles.
- ^Note 5: Nevila & Valer won a task, and they won immunity. Also for surviving the first eviction, Esterina and Juliana won immunity too.
- ^Note 6: Although the housemates were nominated as pairs, only one of them was going to get evicted.
- ^Note 7: Arbana gave a challenge to Nevila, and if she would pass it, she would give immunity to all the girls. Nevila passed the challenge, so all the girls were immune from nomination.
- ^Note 8: The girls had to vote for the guy they wanted to save from nominations. Ardit was saved by the girls, and the other boys were then put up for eviction.
- ^Note 9: Four housemates were immune this week; Meridian was immune because he was able to lose 5 kg, a task Big Brother gave him during the previous week, Fatjon and Matilda were immune because no one from the housemates caught up on their game and nobody got to understand they were a real married couple outside the House, Juliana was immune for being really determined on her game on breaking up the pairs on the house, in this case, Juliana tried to break up Fatjon from Daniela and tried to keep away Matilda from Fatjon, even though she didn't know these last ones were married in real life.
- ^Note 10: Only the housemates that were immune had the power to nominate. They all had to nominate three people each. The housemates with the number of votes higher than one would go up for eviction.
- ^Note 11: Fatjon was immune because he completed a challenge. He was able to form the name of Lasgush Poradeci with the letters drawn around the walls of the House.
- ^Note 12: Fatjon was immune for yet another week because on Day 32, he completed another challenge. During the live show of that week it was revealed that all the male housemates were immune.
- ^Note 13: Because all the male housemates were immune, all the female housemates were initially put up for eviction. Than, every male housemate had to vote to save one of the girls. The housemates with two or more votes would be saved from nomination. Nevila was saved with three votes, Violeta and Mikela with two each. All of the remaining female housemates were nominated.
- ^Note 14: During this week there was a double eviction. A new twist was introduced to the game only for this week. All the housemates voted for the head of household and after the voting Meridian won with 5 votes. The head of household, now Meridian, had to put three housemates up for eviction and he chose: Ardit, Katerina and Nevila. When each of Meridian's nominees entered the Diary Room it was revealed that the power had shifted towards them. Meridian by nominating these three housemates, had unintentionally given them immunity and power to nominate. Now the "nominees" had to vote one of the housemates to put them up for eviction. Valer and Violeta were put up for eviction with two and one votes accordingly.
- ^Note 15: For this week, Meridian as the outgoing head of household and with an accomplished mission won immunity by Big Brother. Later on, the girls were asked if they wanted to give immunity to any of the male housemates and with the majority of votes, Visar won immunity for this week as well.
- ^Note 16: During the weekly task the housemates were divided in two groups: Nevila, Juliana, Ardit, Meridian and Jona, Visar, Valer, Mikela, Enkelejd. On the live show it was revealed that each of the housemates would have to save from nomination two of the members of their own group. The two housemates with the most votes to be saved; one from each group, would be finally safe from the nomination, meanwhile the remaining housemates would be nominated. If the votes were even, all the housemates would be put up for eviction.
- ^Note 17: This week, males had to nominate females and vice versa. The male housemate and the female housemate with most of the votes would be put up for eviction.
- ^Note 18: The nominations were not made by the housemates but by a random draw. Each housemate had to choose one little box from each of the seven pots around the table which corresponded to each of the seven remaining housemates. They had to decide to save one of the three choices that were drawn from the pot and consequently the other two names drawn from the pot would serve as nominees. Ardit saved Nevila and thus nominated Juliana and Meridian; Valer chose to save himself and to nominate Visar and Meridian; Meridian chose to nominate Juliana and Ardit, thus saved Nevila. Jona decided to save Visar and to give her nomination votes to Valer and herself, meanwhile Visar nominated Nevila and Ardit, but saved Meridian; Nevila saved Ardit and nominated Juliana and Valer and the last one, Juliana saved herself and nominated Nevila and Visar.
- ^Note 19: Jona had the fewest votes to be put up for eviction so she was declared safe and through to the final.
- ^Note 20: During the finale there were three rounds which put two housemates against each other. So from six would remain only three finalists. First of, the lines were open for Ardit and Valer, with Ardit being the one evicted. Secondly, the lines were open for Jona and Juliana, from which Juliana got evicted. Lastly, the lines were again open for Nevila and Meridian and Meridian was evicted.
- ^Note 21: Valer, Jona and Nevila survived the first three rounds of eviction. The lines were open for the winner.

== Nominations totals received ==
	Week 1	Week 2	Week 3	Week 4	Week 5	Week 6		Week 7	Week 8	Week 9	Week 10	Week 11	Week 12	Week 13	Week 14	Total
Nevila	–	–	0	0	1	–	2	6	2	2	2	7	1	4	–	26
Jona	–	1	–	0	3	0	–	0	1	2	2	4	3	1	–	14
Valer	–	–	–	1	0	3	1	0	0	3	0	0	3	2	–	6
Meridian	–	1	1	–	3	–	–	0	–	1	4	1	0	2	–	12
Juliana	–	–	–	–	1	0	–	1	1	0	1	3	3	2	–	9
Ardit	–	1	3	1	2	–	1	5	3	3	5	2	2	2	–	23
Visar	Not in House				–	–	–	0	–	1	0	1	3	0	Evicted	2
Mikela	–	2	–	1	2	2	–	1	0	4	1	0	2	3	Evicted	14
Enkelejd	–	0	2	2	2	–	–	5	0	0	4	0	1	Evicted		13
Lori	Not in House				–	0	–	2	3	1	0	2	Evicted			8
Matilda	–	0	–	–	2	1	–	1	5	2	3	Evicted				13
Katerina	Not in House				–	0	1	2	5	5	Evicted					12
Fatjon	–	1	2	–	–	–	–	1	6	Evicted						8
Myrteza	Not in House				–	–	–	5	Evicted							5
Donald	Not in House				–	–	–	1	Walked							1
Violeta	–	0	–	3	4	2	1	Evicted								8
Esida	–	2	–	2	1	0	Evicted									5
Rigels	–	0	0	0	5	Evicted										5
Esterina	–	–	–	2	Evicted											2
Erald	–	1	0	Evicted												1
Daniela	–	0	Evicted													0
Ardijana	–	Evicted														0
Ervin	Ejected															0
Andia	Walked															0

- On Week 3, on the first round of Week 6 and on Week 12 the votes were to save and not to nominate, so the numbers were not added to the total.
- On the second round of Week 6 Meridian was given immunity because he was chosen as the head of household. Meridian unintentionally gave immunity to Ardit, Katerina and Nevila, so the nomination votes of Meridian were not added to the total.
