= Albanian Football Federation =

Governing body of football in Albania

UEFA
- Full name: Albanian Football Federation
- Short name: FSHF
- Founded: 6 June 1930; 95 years ago (as a branch of the Albanian Sports Federation); February 1962; 64 years ago (current form)
- Headquarters: Tirana
- FIFA affiliation: 16 June 1932; 93 years ago
- UEFA affiliation: 15 June 1954; 71 years ago
- President: Armand Duka
- Website: fshf.org

The Albanian Football Federation (Albanian: Federata Shqiptare e Futbollit; FSHF) is the governing body of football in Albania. Headquartered in Tirana, it organises the national football leagues of Kategoria Superiore, Kategoria e Parë, Kategoria e Dytë, Kategoria e Tretë, Albanian Cup, Supercup, Kategoria Superiore Femra and the Albanian Women's Cup. The federation also coordinates and oversees the activities of the Albania national football team, Albania women's national football team and the Albania national youth football teams such as Under-21, Under-20, Under-19, Under-18, Under-17, Under-16 and Under-15.

== History ==
On 6 June 1930, the government of King Zog I issued a royal decree recognising the establishment of the Albanian Sports Federation. The newly formed sports entity would join the world governing body, FIFA, during the June Congress of 1932, officially marking Albania’s participation in international football. A revised order was issued in March of 1934, to dissolve the Federation, transferring its authority to the heads of the national entity "Vllaznija Shqiptare" (est.1928), which was in charge of various sports activities at the time. The federation was one of the founding members of UEFA in 1954.

On 14 March 2008, FSHF were suspended by FIFA for "heavy political interference." This meant that their national teams were banned from playing official matches, representatives banned from official events, and referees unable to officiate FIFA-sanctioned matches. The ban was subsequently lifted as the political interferences were clarified, and on 27 May 2008, Albania played a friendly against Poland.

The current president of FSHF, Armand Duka, has been at this position since 2002 and won the elections for a third term in 2010.

During the 2009 controversy between FSHF and the Albanian government as to the property of the Qemal Stafa Stadium. UEFA insisted in lobbying that the stadium be given to FSHF ownership so that investments on it can be made. In February 2011 it was decided that the new stadium, which will replace the current one and will cost 60M Euro, will be 75% of FSHF and 25% of the Albanian government.

== Offices ==
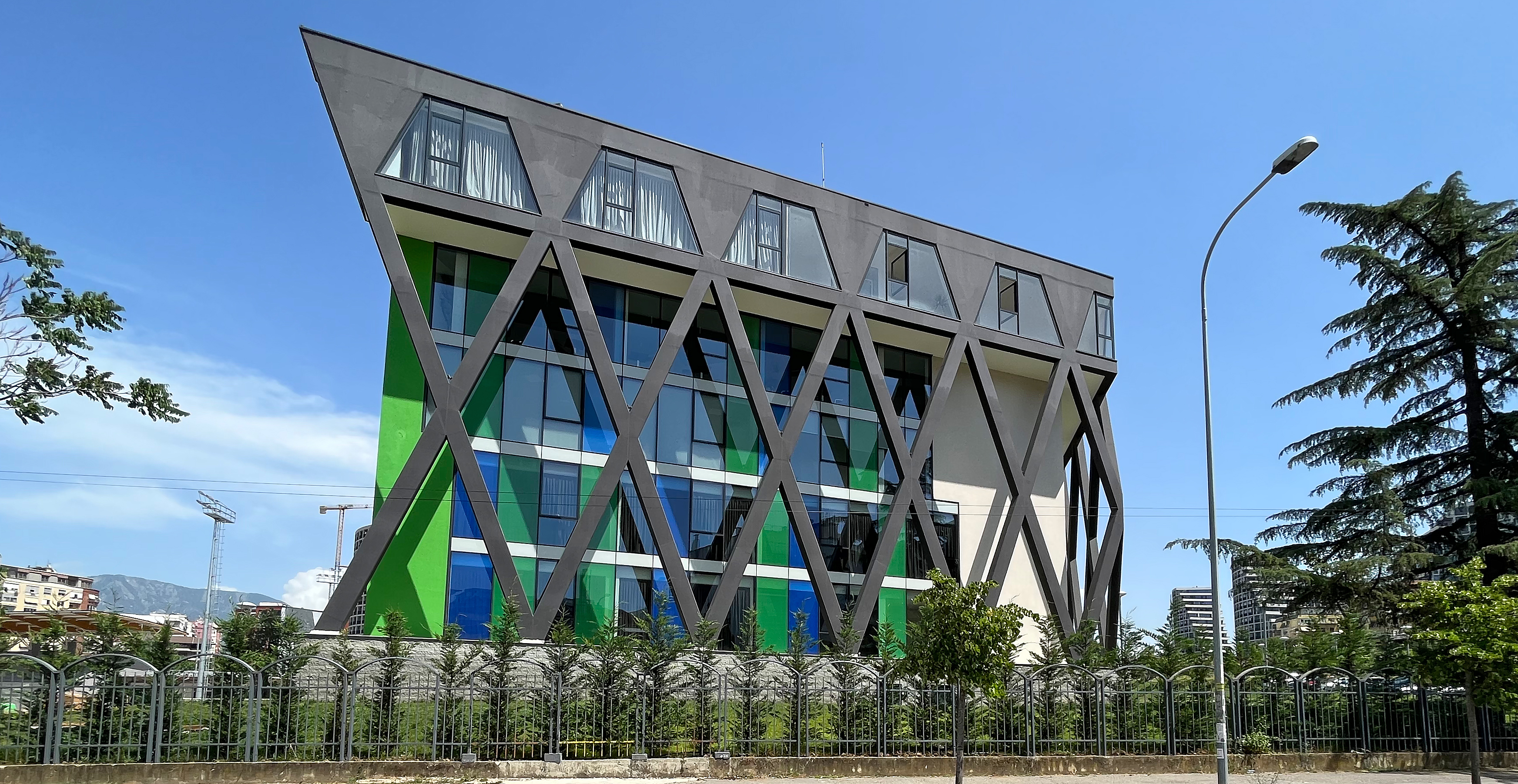
FSHF headquarters in Tirana

- Tirana (Headquarters)
- Durrës (Regional Office, 2011 opened)
- Shkodër (Regional Office, 2015 opened)

== Presidents ==
No.	Name	Term in office	
Albanian Sports Federation (1930–34)
1	Izedin Beshiri	6 June 1930	April 1931
2	Musa Juka	April 1931	December 1934
Vllaznija Shqiptare (1934–45)
3	Mirash Ivanaj	13 August 1935	19 October 1935
4	Nush Bushati	21 October 1935	7 November 1936
5	Faik Shatku	January 1937	December 1938
Albanian Sports Federation (1945–62)
6	Anton Mazreku	June 1945	June 1946
7	Kristo Papajani	March 1947	February 1948
8	Kiço Janku	February 1948	July 1948
—	unknown	July 1948	1962
Albanian Football Federation (1962–present)
—	unknown	1962	1970
9	Zyber Konçi	1970	1980
10	Kristaq Miço	1982	1988
11	Eduard Dervishi	1990	1997
12	Miço Papadhopulli	1997	6 February 2002
13	Armand Duka	1 March 2002	Incumbent

== Current sponsorships ==
As of December 2025

General Sponsor

- Vodafone Albania

Diamond Sponsor

- SIGAL

Technical Sponsor

- Macron

Gold Sponsor

- Credins Bank
- Birra Vatan

Official Sponsors

- Western Union
- Zenith Travel & Tours
- Karrota
- Uji Tepelenë
- Samsonite
- Sixtus Italia
- Match Worn Shirt
- Abissnet

== See also ==
- Albania national football team
- Football in Albania
