= Big Brother Albania season 2 =

Season of an Albanian television series

Big Brother Albania
- Season 2
- Presented by: Arbana Osmani
- No. of days: 99
- No. of housemates: 20
- Winner: Qetsor Ferunaj
- Runner-up: Adelajda

Release
- Original network: Top Channel
- Original release: 7 February – 16 May 2009

Season chronology
- ← Previous; Season 1 Next → Season 3

Big Brother Albania 2 was the second season of the Albanian series of the worldwide franchise of Big Brother. It launched on Saturday, 7 February 2009, with fourteen Housemates entering the House. The show was set to run for 99 days until Saturday, 16 May 2009, and the winner, Qetsor Ferunaj received a €70,000 prize. Big Brother 2 (Albania) aired on two cable channels 24 hours a day on the DigitAlb cable network, as well as on two additional channels on DigitAlb Mobile. Daily reviews were shown Monday through Saturday on Top Channel. The eviction show aired on Saturdays at 21:00 CET, while a Sunday edition closed off the week. The main host was Arbana Osmani, while Eno Popi hosted a Sunday morning edition called "Big Brother Albania Fans' Club", featuring dialogues with eliminated contestants and fans of the show. A panel of opinionists was present during the main Saturday show. Arjan Konomi, a magazine editor, and Virusi, a composer and songwriter from Kosovo, had permanent positions in this panel, while different singers, psychologists and relevant art figures were sometimes invited to give their insight.

== Housemates ==
Housemates	Age	Entered	Exited	Status
Qetsor	33	Day 1	Day 99	Winner
Adelajda	23	Day 1	Day 99	Runner-Up
Bjordi	21	Day 1	Day 99	Third Place
Ardian	40	Day 1	Day 99	Fourth Place
Arjon		Day 57	Day 95	Evicted
Anjeza	20	Day 43	Day 92	Evicted
Mimoza	19	Day 1	Day 92	Evicted
Junida		Day 57	Day 85	Evicted
Elton		Day 57	Day 78	Evicted
Arjon	24	Day 1	Day 78	Evicted
Aida	25	Day 1	Day 71	Evicted
Antonin	23	Day 43	Day 64	Evicted
Dritan	26	Day 1	Day 64	Evicted
Republika	24	Day 1	Day 57	Evicted
Lirita	22	Day 1	Day 50	Evicted
Mesida	25	Day 22	Day 43	Evicted
Zhuljeta	27	Day 1	Day 36	Evicted
Pavlin	28	Day 1	Day 29	Evicted
Agon	26	Day 1	Day 22	Evicted
Erjola	35	Day 1	Day 15	Evicted

== Nominations table ==
	Week 2	Week 3	Week 4	Week 5	Week 6	Week 7	Week 8	Week 9		Week 10	Week 11		Week 12		Week 13		Week 14	Final	
Qetsor	Mimoza; Zhuljeta	Aida; Arjon	Bjordi; Aida	Lirita; Adelajda	Lirita; Dritan	Ardian; Mimoza	Aida; Adelajda	Dritan; Bjordi	Arjon	Arjan; Elton	Ardian; Elton	Nominated	Anjeza; Ardian	—N/a	Bjordi; Adelajda	Arjan; Ardian	No nominations	Winner (Day 99)	
Adelajda	Erjola; Zhuljeta	Agon; Aida	Aida; Lirita	Zhuljeta; Lirita	Mesida; Aida	Aida; Lirita	Aida; Bjordi	Aida; Qetsor	Qetsor	Aida; Junida	Arjon; Junida	Ardian	Junida; Anjeza	—N/a	Arjan; Qetsor	Arjan; Anjeza	No nominations	Runner-up (Day 99)	
Bjordi	Erjola; Zhuljeta	Pavlin; Dritan	Pavlin; Aida	Qetsor; Republika	Aida; Arjon	Aida; Mimoza	Aida; Republika	Aida; Dritan	Adelajda	Aida; Arjon	Qetsor; Arjon	Anjeza	Junida; Anjeza	—N/a	Qetsor; Mimoza	Arjan; Anjeza	No nominations	Third Place (Day 99)	
Ardian	Qetsor; Zhuljeta	Arjon; Zhuljeta	Arjon; Pavlin	Arjon; Qetsor	Arjon; Qetsor	Mimoza; Aida	Aida; Qetsor	Dritan; Mimoza	Bjordi	Arjon; Qetsor	Arjon; Qetsor	Nominated	Qetsor; Mimoza	—N/a	Mimoza; Qetsor	Qetsor; Anjeza	No nominations	Fourth Place (Day 99)	
Arjan	Not in House							Exempt	Nominated	Qetsor; Arjon	Arjon; Junida	Nominated	Junida; Anjeza	—N/a	Adelajda; Qetsor	Qetsor; Anjeza	No nominations	Evicted (Day 95)	
Anjeza	Not in House					Exempt	Republika; Mimoza	Mimoza; Aida	Aida	Mimoza; Aida	Mimoza; Arjan	Arjan	Adelajda; Ardian	—N/a	Adelajda; Mimoza	Arjan; Adelajda	Evicted (Day 92)		
Mimoza	Qetsor; Zhuljeta	Arjon; Agon	Aida; Arjon	Arjon; Zhuljeta	Arjon; Mesida	Aida; Qetsor	Dritan; Ardian	Qetsor; Anjeza	Ardian	Arjon; Anjeza	Arjon; Junida	Elton	Junida; Anjeza	—N/a	Arjan; Ardian	Evicted (Day 92)			
Junida	Not in House							Exempt	Nominated	Qetsor; Adelajda	Qetsor; Adelajda	Qetsor	Adelajda; Mimoza	Evicted (Day 85)					
Elton	Not in House							Exempt	Nominated	Qetsor; Adelajda	Adelajda; Arjan	Nominated	Evicted (Day 78)						
Arjon	Bjordi; Dritan	Dritan; Bjordi	Ardian; Pavlin	Ardian; Dritan	Aida; Lirita	Lirita; Mimoza	Dritan; Bjordi	Mimoza; Dritan	Anjeza	Ardian; Junida	Ardian; Arjan	Evicted (Day 78)							
Aida	Mimoza; Qetsor	Adelajda; Qetsor	Qetsor; Pavlin	Adelajda; Bjordi	Arjon; Qetsor	Adelajda; Qetsor	Adelajda; Qetsor	Adelajda; Bjordi	Exempt	Adelajda; Bjordi	Evicted (Day 71)								
Antonin	Not in House					Exempt	Adelajda; Republika	Bjordi; Anjeza	Nominated	Evicted (Day 64)									
Dritan	Agon; Erjola	Arjon; Agon	Zhuljeta; Arjon	Mimoza; Zhuljeta	Bjordi; Arjon	Aida; Qetsor	Mimoza; Ardian	Mimoza; Anjeza	Evicted (Day 64)										
Republika	Erjola; Zhuljeta	Arjon; Zhuljeta	Zhuljeta; Pavlin	Zhuljeta; Qetsor	Arjon; Mesida	Ardian; Aida	Qetsor; Aida	Evicted (Day 57)											
Lirita	Mimoza; Qetsor	Adelajda; Qetsor	Qetsor; Zhuljeta	Qetsor; Zhuljeta	Qetsor; Arjon	Bjordi; Adelajda	Evicted (Day 50)												
Mesida	Not in House		Exempt	Zhuljeta; Adelajda	Mimoza; Qetsor	Evicted (Day 43)													
Zhuljeta	Adelajda; Erjola	Republika; Adelajda	Adelajda; Ardian	Ardian; Lirita	Evicted (Day 36)														
Pavlin	Arjon; Erjola	Aida; Arjon	Aida; Arjon	Evicted (Day 29)															
Agon	Adelajda; Republika	Adelajda; Republika	Evicted (Day 22)																
Erjola	Republika; Zhuljeta	Evicted (Day 15)																	
Notes	none									none			none			none		none	
Nominated For Eviction	Erjola; Zhuljeta	Adelajda; Agon; Aida; Arjon	Aida; Arjon; Pavlin	Adelajda; Lirita; Qetsor; Zhuljeta	Aida; Arjon; Mesida; Qetsor	Adelajda; Aida; Ardian; Lirita; Mimoza; Qetsor	Adelajda; Aida; Qetsor; Republika	Aida; Anjeza; Bjordi; Dritan; Mimoza	Antonin; Arjan; Elton; Junida	Adelajda; Aida; Arjon; Qetsor	Arjan; Arjon; Junida; Qetsor	Anjeza; Ardian; Arjan; Elton; Qetsor	Adelajda; Anjeza; Ardian; Junida; Mimoza	Anjeza	Adelajda; Mimoza; Qetsor	Anjeza; Arjan	Adelajda; Ardian; Arjan; Qetsor	Adelajda; Adrian; Bjordi; Qetsor	
Evicted	Erjola; 56% to evict	Agon; 36% to evict	Pavlin; 37% to evict	Zhuljeta; 66% to evict	Mesida; 36% to evict	Lirita; 28% to evict	Republika; 36% to evict	Dritan; 32% to evict	Antonin; 32% to evict	Aida; 56% to evict	Arjon; 38% to evict	Elton; 55% to evict	Junida; 30% to evict	Anjeza; Most votes to save	Mimoza; 42% to evict	Anjeza; 58% to evict	Arjan; 58% to evict	Ardian; Fewest votes (out of 4)	Bjordi; Fewest votes (out of 3)
Evicted	Erjola; 56% to evict	Agon; 36% to evict	Pavlin; 37% to evict	Zhuljeta; 66% to evict	Mesida; 36% to evict	Lirita; 28% to evict	Republika; 36% to evict	Dritan; 32% to evict	Antonin; 32% to evict	Aida; 56% to evict	Arjon; 38% to evict	Elton; 55% to evict	Junida; 30% to evict	Anjeza; Most votes to save	Mimoza; 42% to evict	Anjeza; 58% to evict	Arjan; 58% to evict	Adelajda; Fewest votes (out of 2)	Qetsor; Most votes to win

=== Notes ===
- ^Note 1: In round nine of nominations housemates had to make a "chain of immunity" starting with Mimoza and continuing until only four housemates were not immune. The four housemates not part of the chain were automatically nominated for eviction.
- ^Note 2: In round twelve of nominations each female housemate had to nominate a male housemate, who would then be automatically up for eviction. The next female housemate to nominate could not nominate a housemate that had already been nominated. The male housemate that was not nominated then had to automatically nominate one of the female housemates.
- ^Note 3: In round fourteen the nominations were done in secret with each housemate writing down on a sheet of paper who they wanted to nominate. Anjeza received the most nominations with 5 and was up for eviction. The public then voted for whether they wanted to save or evict Anjeza. If she received more evict votes she would be evicted, if she received more save votes she would be saved and immune from the next round of nominations.
- ^Note 4: A surprise eviction took place in the final week in order to determine who the finalists would be except from Bjordi who received exemption from the mothers of the housemates.
