= Big Brother Albania season 6 =

Season of an Albanian television series

Big Brother Albania
- Season 6
- Presented by: Arbana Osmani
- No. of days: 99
- No. of housemates: 18
- Winner: Anaid Kaloti
- Runner-up: Iliri

Release
- Original network: Top Channel
- Original release: 23 February – 1 June 2013

Season chronology
- ← Previous; Season 5 Next → Season 7

Big Brother Albania 6 was the sixth season of the Albanian series of the worldwide franchise of Big Brother. It started on 23 February 2013, on Top Channel and ended on 1 June 2013. The eviction show aired on Saturdays at 21:00 CET, while a spin-off aired on Sundays called Big Brother Albania Fans' Club. The main host is Arbana Osmani, while Albana Osmani hosted the Sunday morning show, featuring dialogues with eliminated contestants and fans of the show. Arian Konomi took over for the fourth time the role of the panelist. Like all of the previous seasons, this one also had its 24/7 live PPV channels on DigitAlb. The winner received 15,000,000 lekë (€100,000). Anaidi was the winner of the season, being so the fifth male winner in the Big Brother Albania history. The house was rebuilt from scratch with a new location in Kashar, Albania. In the house there are four new rooms added: The Secret's Room, The Surprises' Room, The Matrix Room and The Library.

This season use some of the game mechanics from the Secret Story franchise, based on the original French version.

== Housemates ==
Housemates	Age	Entered	Exited	Status
Anaidi	27	Day 1	Day 99	Winner
Iliri	27	Day 1	Day 99	Runner-Up
Elona	27	Day 1	Day 99	Third Place
Shpendi	30	Day 1	Day 99	Fourth Place
Eldora	27	Day 1	Day 92	Evicted
Rike	24	Day 50	Day 92	Evicted
Vigani	21	Day 22	Day 85	Evicted
Joana	26	Day 1	Day 78	Evicted
Edberi	25	Day 22	Day 78	Evicted
Elena	18	Day 1	Day 64	Evicted
Xhimi	44	Day 1	Day 57	Evicted
Olta	25	Day 1	Day 50	Evicted
Marselini	25	Day 1	Day 43	Evicted
Jonilda	25	Day 1	Day 36	Evicted
Arsimi	33	Day 1	Day 29	Evicted
Etleva	20	Day 1	Day 22	Evicted
Olsen	27	Day 1	Day 15	Evicted
Altina		Day 1	Day 15	Walked

== Secrets ==
Rike entered the house in Week 8, thus she didn't have any real secret in the game. On the eleventh week, a mission was given to Rike to change all housemates' hair colour but still this didn't count as a secret.

On Day 71 the secret of Edberi & Vigani was revealed to all the housemates currently in the house and since then they've played the game separately.

Secret	Person	Discovered by	Discovered on:
I'm thalassemic ^{1}	Eldora	Elena	Day 42
I practice taekwondo ^{1}	Elona	Anaidi	Day 6
I haven't spoken to my father in 13 months ^{1}	Shpendi	Iliri	Day 15
I'm married ^{1}	Xhimi	Not Discovered	Revealed on Day 56
I'm going to have plastic surgery during my stay in Big Brother ^{2}	Jonilda	Not Discovered	Revealed on Day 22
My tattoo on my body is my mother and not my fiancé ^{1}	Olsen	Not Discovered	Revealed on Day 15
I know more than 1000 song lyrics from memory ^{1}	Iliri	Joana	Day 54
I have smoked since 4 years old for medical reasons ^{1}	Elena	Anaidi	Day 49
I'm a gigolo ^{1}	Marselini	Not Discovered	Revealed on Day 43
I'm a crazy fan of the Real Madrid soccer team ^{3}	Altina	Not Discovered	Revealed on Day 15
I have been helping an invalid friend for 10 years ^{1}	Anaidi	Not Discovered	Revealed on Day 71
I have a hundred pair of shoes ^{1}	Joana	Eldora	Day 56
I'm a vegetarian ^{1}	Olta	Iliri	Day 29
"Kanun" has ruined my life and my relationship ^{1}	Etleva	Not Discovered	Revealed on Day 22
I have the power to permanently nominate another housemate ^{1}	Arsimi	Anaidi	Day 13
We are two housemates playing as one ^{4}	Edberi & Vigani	Not Discovered	Revealed on Day 71

1.This secret was revealed to all the housemates in the house on Day 71.
2.This secret was revealed to all the housemates in the house on Day 22 when Jonilda re-entered the house.
3.This secret was revealed to all the housemates in the house on Day 22 because one week before Altina decided to walk.
4.This secret was revealed to all the housemates in the house on Day 71 and since then Edberi & Vigani have played the game separately.

== Reception ==
=== Controversy & criticism ===
Altina's secret leaked on social networks because of a photo someone had found in her Facebook account. After this thing it is supposed that the production took care to shut down all of the housemates' personal profiles and accounts. However, there were still fan pages administrated by the housemates' relatives that posted photos.

After two weeks the show had started there were rumors that two of the housemates: Anaidi and Joana were in a relationship out the house and that they knew each other. However, in an exclusive interview for Bluetooth Magazine, Rezart Aga, the producer of the show said that the housemates were picked carefully and there are no acquaintances between them.

In the Week 8 Live Show of Saturday, Arian Konomi the panelist of the show offended Xhimi by saying that he was a person without personality and then a fight erupted between these two. Arian was criticized by many journalists and people for his harsh comments towards the housemates. In the Week 9 Live Show he publicly apologized to Xhimi, the housemates and the viewers. At the same night Xhimi was evicted from the house and on an interview he said that he regrets making a joke in the house saying he had put condoms in the meal. However, this statement was a proof to the question if there are or not condoms in the house.

Since Rike entered the house in Week 8 she already knew all of the housemates' secrets. Even though, Arbana Osmani said that Rike won't tell any of the secrets to the other housemates she broke the rules on Day 60 by telling the secret of Anaidi to both Joana and Elona. Two days after this thing happened the production took on the official Facebook page of Big Brother Albania to tell that Rike doesn't know any of the secrets and so she couldn't tell any of the housemates any secret. The fans claimed that Osmani herself told that Rike already knew the secrets making this story a lot more controversial.

The day he was evicted, Xhimi posted a photo on Facebook with a caption blaming the panelist of the show, Arjan Konomi, for being the one who decided to evict him and said that the public's votes were rigged.

=== Critical reception ===
Moving to the new formula, this year Big Brother received mainly negative reviews. Many of the critics said that the new format just made the show more boring than it was. There were also rumors that the following year the production had decided to switch back to the previous and basic format of the show with a reduced number of housemates. However, there were people and fans of the show who loved the new format and said that it made the show more interesting, in a way that viewers can connect more to the housemates. The season finale was considered as one of the best finales ever in the last four years. However, there were also critiques from fans who said that what made the finale boring was that for everything they had to show a video first. During the Finale there were shown almost 16 videos with a length of three to five minutes.

=== Viewing figures ===
Ratings have also been down to 20% for the first weeks of this season comparing it to the previous seasons but still during the following weeks the ratings improved and Big Brother regained its place like the winner for Saturday's night prime time. Again in the last four weeks, Big Brother suffered some of its worst ratings in six years. On Saturday, 18 May, Big Brother had to compete against the finale of Eurovision Song Contest 2013, but still managed to do good, meanwhile on Saturday, 25 May it had to compete against the finale of Champions League.

Air Date	Share	Viewers	Weekly Rank
Saturday, 23 February	36.4%	691 076	1
Saturday, 2 March	TBA	TBA	TBA
Saturday, 9 March	TBA	TBA	TBA
Saturday, 16 March	TBA	TBA	TBA
Saturday, 23 March	TBA	TBA	TBA
Saturday, 30 March	34.3%	698 549	2
Saturday, 6 April	34.9%	618 298	1
Saturday, 13 April	35.6%	620 907	1
Saturday, 20 April	35.9%	628 326	1
Saturday, 27 April	35.2%	626 924	1
Saturday, 4 May	39.3%	680 226	1
Saturday, 11 May	37.6%	658 211	3
Saturday, 18 May	30.9%	530 264	3
Saturday, 25 May	33.9%	604 428	2
Saturday, 1 June	47.2%	776 850	1
Sunday, 9 June (Reunion)	29.2%	601 200	2

=== The Reunion Show (Post Big Brother) ===
The Reunion Show was held one week after the finale of the season. The day was set to be on Sunday at 22:00 CET. Before the official announcement of the day there were rumors that the show would air either on Friday or Saturday. All the housemates took part, except Altina, and there were discussions for all the fights and controversies that happened during the season.

== Nominations table ==
	Week 2	Week 3	Week 4	Week 5	Week 6	Week 7	Week 8	Week 9	Week 10	Week 11		Week 12	Week 13	Week 14		
	Week 2	Week 3	Week 4	Week 5	Week 6	Week 7	Week 8	Week 9	Week 10	Day 71	Day 78	Week 12	Week 13	Day 92	Final	
Anaidi	Elena; Etleva	Marselini; Etleva	Olta; Elona	Iliri; Jonilda	Shpendi; Iliri	Olta; Edberi	Iliri; Elona	Vigani; Eldora	Eldora	Rike; Vigani	Rike	Iliri; Eldora	Elona; Iliri	No; Nominations	Winner; Day 99	
Iliri	Etleva; Olta	Marselini; Joana	Joana; Elona	Marselini; Joana	Xhimi; Joana	Joana; Xhimi	Xhimi; Joana	Elena; Vigani	Joana	Joana; Vigani	Joana	Vigani; Eldora	Elona; Shpendi	No; Nominations	Runner-Up; Day 99	
Elona	Marselini; Olsen	Marselini; Arsimi	Marselini; Arsimi	Marselini; Joana	Joana; Marselini	Joana; Xhimi	Xhimi; Joana	Elena; Iliri	Joana	Joana; Edberi	Joana	Vigani; Eldora	Shpendi; Iliri	No; Nominations	Third Place; Day 99	
Shpendi	Elena; Elona	Marselini; Iliri	Elena; Olta	Marselini; Joana	Marselini; Joana	Olta; Joana	Joana; Elena	Elona; Edberi	Joana	Rike; Joana	Joana	Iliri; Rike	Rike; Elona	No; Nominations	Fourth Place; Day 99	
Eldora	Xhimi; Iliri	Xhimi; Iliri	Arsimi; Xhimi	Xhimi; Joana	Olta; Joana	Joana; Xhimi	Xhimi; Joana	Elena; Vigani	Joana	Joana; Edberi	Joana	Vigani; Rike	Rike; Iliri	No; Nominations	Evicted (Day 92)	
Rike	Not in House						Exempt	Joana; Elena	Joana	Joana; Edberi	Joana	Vigani; Eldora	Shpendi; Eldora	Evicted (Day 92)		
Vigani	Not in House		2-in-1 connection with Edberi (Days 22 - 71)							Eldora; Rike	Rike	Iliri; Rike	Evicted (Day 85)			
Joana	Marselini; Iliri	Arsimi; Iliri	Iliri; Arsimi	Jonilda; Olta	Elona; Olta	Elona; Iliri	Iliri; Elona	Eldora; Edberi	Eldora	Rike; Elona	Rike	Evicted (Day 78)				
Edberi	Not in House		2-in-1 connection with Vigani (Days 22 - 71)							Elona; Rike	Evicted (Day 78)					
Edberi & Vigani	Not in House		Exempt	Marselini; Joana	Olta; Marselini	Olta; Joana	Joana; Xhimi	Eldora; Elona	Joana; Eldora	2-in-1 Connection split by Big Brother (Day 71)						
Elena	Shpendi; Xhimi	Etleva; Xhimi	Arsimi; Xhimi	Xhimi; Olta	Marselini; Iliri	Olta; Elona	Elona; Edberi	Eldora; Vigani	Evicted (Day 64)							
Xhimi	Joana; Elena	Marselini; Joana	Eldora; Elena	Joana; Marselini	Marselini; Joana	Joana; Eldora	Iliri; Elona	Evicted (Day 57)								
Olta	Marselini; Shpendi	Marselini; Elena	Marselini; Shpendi	Marselini; Shpendi	Marselini; Joana	Vigani; Edberi	Evicted (Day 50)									
Marselini	Joana; Olta	Olta; Elona	Elona; Olta	Olta; Jonilda	Shpendi; Joana	Evicted (Day 43)										
Jonilda	Marselini; Shpendi	Secret; Room	Exempt	Marselini; Eldora	Evicted (Day 36)											
Arsimi	Anaidi; Joana; Elena	Marselini; Joana	Elena; Joana	Evicted (Day 29)												
Etleva	Olsen; Marselini	Marselini; Elena	Evicted (Day 22)													
Olsen	Etleva; Elona	Evicted (Day 15)														
Altina	Marselini; Olsen	Walked (Day 15)														
Notes	1, 2	3	2, 3	4	none	5		5, 6	7	8	9	2	10	11	none	
Up for eviction	Anaidi; Elena; Etleva; Joana; Marselini; Olsen; Shpendi	Anaidi; Arsimi; Elena; Etleva; Iliri; Joana; Marselini; Xhimi	Anaidi; Arsimi; Elena; Elona; Marselini; Olta; Xhimi	Anaidi; Joana; Jonilda; Marselini; Olta	Anaidi; Joana; Marselini; Olta	Anaidi; Edberi/Vigani; Joana; Olta; Xhimi	Anaidi; Elona; Joana; Xhimi	Anaidi; Edberi/Vigani; Eldora; Elena	none	Anaidi; Edberi; Joana; Rike	Anaidi; Joana	Anaidi; Eldora; Iliri; Rike; Vigani	Anaidi; Elona; Iliri; Rike; Shpendi	Anaidi; Elona; Eldora; Iliri; Shpendi	Anaidi; Elona; Iliri; Shpendi	
Walked	Altina	none														
Evicted	Olsen; Most votes to evict	Etleva; Most votes to evict	Arsimi; Most votes to evict	Jonilda; Most votes to evict	Marselini; Most votes to evict	Olta; Most votes to evict	Xhimi; Most votes to evict	Elena; Most votes to evict	No; Eviction	Edberi; Most votes to evict	Joana; Most votes to evict	Vigani; Most votes to evict	Rike; Most votes to evict	Eldora; Fewest votes to win	Shpendi; Fewest votes to win	Elona; Fewest votes to win
Evicted	Olsen; Most votes to evict	Etleva; Most votes to evict	Arsimi; Most votes to evict	Jonilda; Most votes to evict	Marselini; Most votes to evict	Olta; Most votes to evict	Xhimi; Most votes to evict	Elena; Most votes to evict	No; Eviction	Edberi; Most votes to evict	Joana; Most votes to evict	Vigani; Most votes to evict	Rike; Most votes to evict	Eldora; Fewest votes to win	Iliri; Fewest votes to win	Anaidi; Most votes to win

Nominated forever

=== Notes ===
- ^Note 1: During Week 1, Arismi had the opportunity to nominate one of the housemates in the House. This housemate would be nominated every week until his/her eviction. He chose Anaidi.
- ^Note 2: The housemates could only nominate those of the opposite gender.
- ^Note 3: Jonilda was fake evicted on Day 15, to make a plastic surgery during her stay in Big Brother. Then, on Day 22, she re-entered in the House as a new housemate and was exempt to vote.
- ^Note 4: Edberi and Vigani are competing as a single housemate, so they had to vote only 1 housemate each. As Vigani already voted for Marselini, Edberi had to change his vote to Joana.
- ^Note 5: The housemates can nominate Edberi and Vigani separately. At the end of the nominations, Edberi and Vigani's nominations are added, as only 1 housemate.
- ^Note 6: This week the housemates had to nominate the ones they had never nominated since that week.
- ^Note 7: There was no public vote for this week and no housemate was going to be evicted the following week. However, the housemates still nominated and the nominations were done face to face. This thing was done to make the housemates more determined in their games.
- ^Note 8: Since this week Edberi and Vigani are playing the game separately.
- ^Note 9: This week was a double eviction. During the night the housemates had to nominate one housemate for eviction
- ^Note 10: The nominees (Anaidi, Elona, Iliri, Shpendi) had to choose between Eldora or Rike, the two housemates that were not nominated, to send one of them up for eviction. The nominees voted unanimously for Rike.
- ^Note 11: During this week there was a double eviction. After Rike was evicted the lines were open so that the public could vote for their favorite housemates. After the lines were closed, Eldora was the housemate with the fewest votes, thus she was evicted.

== Nominations totals received ==
	Week 2	Week 3	Week 4	Week 5	Week 6	Week 7	Week 8	Week 9	Week 10	Week 11		Week 12	Week 13	Week 14	Finale	Total
Anaidi	–	–	–	–	–	–	–	–	0	–	–	–	–	–	Winner	0
Iliri	2	3	1	1	2	1	3	1	0	0	0	3	3	–	Runner-Up	20
Elona	2	1	3	0	1	2	4	1	0	2	0	0	3	–	3rd Place	19
Shpendi	3	0	1	1	2	0	0	0	0	0	0	0	3	–	4th Place	10
Eldora	0	0	1	1	0	1	0	4	3	1	0	4	1	–	Evicted	13
Rike	Not in House						–	0	0	5	3	3	1	Evicted		12
Vigani	Not in House		2-in-1 connection with Edberi							2	0	4	Evicted			6
Joana	3	3	2	6	7	6	5	1	6	5	5	Evicted				43
Edberi	Not in House		2-in-1 connection with Vigani							3	Evicted					3
Edberi/Vigani	Not in House		–	0	0	3	1	6	0	2-in-1 Connection split by Big Brother						10
Elena	4	2	3	0	0	0	1	5	Evicted							15
Xhimi	2	2	2	2	1	3	4	Evicted								16
Olta	2	1	3	3	3	4	Evicted									16
Marselini	6	8	2	7	6	Evicted										29
Jonilda	0	–		3	Evicted											3
Arsimi	0	2	3	Evicted												5
Etleva	3	2	Evicted													5
Olsen	3	Evicted														3
Altina	0	Walked														0

- On Week 10, the nominations were fake, so they are not added at the total of votes received.
- On Week 14, Rike was nominated as part of a twist.
