= Big Brother Albania season 5 =

Season of an Albanian television series

Big Brother Albania
- Season 5
- Presented by: Arbana Osmani
- No. of days: 99
- No. of housemates: 25
- Winner: Arbër Zeka
- Runner-up: Liam Mandiaro

Release
- Original network: Top Channel
- Original release: 18 February – 26 May 2012

Season chronology
- ← Previous; Season 4 Next → Season 6

Big Brother Albania 5 was the fifth season of the Albanian series of the worldwide franchise of Big Brother. It launched on Saturday, 18 February 2012, with fifteen housemates entering the house. The winner received the 15,000,000 lekë (€100,000) prize. The fifth season of Big Brother Albania aired on two cable and satellite channels 24 hours a day on the Digit-Alb TV network, as well as on two additional channels on DigitAlb Mobile. Daily reviews were shown Monday through Saturday on Top Channel. The eviction show aired on Saturdays at 21:00 CET, while a Sunday edition closed off the week. The main host is Arbana Osmani, while Albana Osmani hosted the Sunday morning spin-off called "Big Brother Albania Fans' Club", featuring dialogues with eliminated contestants and fans of the show. Arian Konomi returned this year and took over the role of the panelist for the third time, thus replacing Blendi Salaj. The winner of the season is Arbër Zeka. The fifth season of Big Brother Albania is known for being the most controversial one to date, it is known also for its numerous fights between the houseguests and the breakdown of a drug-addicted houseguest during the show.

== Housemates ==
Housemates	Age	Entered	Exited	Status
Arbër	25	Day 15	Day 99	Winner
Liam	33	Day 1	Day 99	Runner-Up
Gentiana	22	Day 1	Day 99	Third Place
Françeska		Day 8	Day 99	Fourth Place
Ermal	24	Day 1	Day 99	Fifth Place
Erion	24	Day 1	Day 92	Evicted
Gerta		Day 43	Day 85	Evicted
Dritan		Day 43	Day 85	Evicted
Graciano	20	Day 1	Day 78	Evicted
Grandiola		Day 43	Day 71	Evicted
Edgar	52	Day 1	Day 64	Evicted
Meti	23	Day 1	Day 57	Evicted
Lorena		Day 15	Day 50	Evicted
Anila	20	Day 1	Day 43	Evicted
Vlashi	25	Day 15	Day 43	Evicted
Klaudja		Day 8	Day 43	Walked
Ermira	24	Day 15	Day 36	Evicted
Doloreza	23	Day 15	Day 29	Evicted
Elvis	22	Day 1	Day 22	Evicted
Arjola	23	Day 1	Day 15	Evicted
Florian	24	Day 1	Day 15	Evicted
Albulena	23	Day 1	Day 15	Evicted
Gjon	32	Day 1	Day 8	Evicted
Emirjeta	30	Day 1	Day 8	Evicted
Besarta	20	Day 1	Day 2	Walked

== Nominations table ==
	Week 1		Week 2	Week 3	Week 4	Week 5	Week 6		Week 7	Week 8		Week 9	Week 10		Week 11		Week 12	Week 13	Final		Nominations received
Arbër	Not in House			Exempt	Klaudja; Erion	Anila; Lorena	Lorena; Anila	Meti	Lorena; Françeska	Erion	Edgar; Dritan	Dritan; Graciano	Grandiola	Graciano; Dritan	Gerta	Gentiana	Gentiana	Gentiana	Winner (Day 99)		14
Liam	Not eligible	Nominated	No nominations	Anila	Klaudja; Ermal	Anila; Lorena	Anila; Meti	Edgar	Meti; Lorena	Erion	Edgar; Graciano	Dritan; Edgar	Grandiola	Graciano; Grandiola	Dritan	Gentiana	Ermal	Françeska	Runner-Up (Day 99)		7
Gentiana	Nominated	Not eligible	No nominations	Graciano	Doloreza; Liam	Klaudja; Françeska	Lorena; Anila	Erion	Edgar; Lorena	Not eligible	Meti; Arbër	Ermal	Grandiola	Gerta; Arbër	Not eligible	Gerta	Ermal	Françeska	Third Place (Day 99)		13
Françeska	Not in House		No nominations	Not eligible	Liam; Anila	Lorena; Ermira	Lorena; Edgar	Not eligible	Lorena; Meti	Gentiana	Meti; Gerta	Erion	Grandiola	Dritan; Gerta	Gentiana	Dritan	Gentiana	Gentiana	Fourth Place (Day 99)		10
Ermal	Not eligible	Nominated	No nominations	Anila	Arbër; Doloreza	Lorena; Anila	Meti; Lorena	Françeska	Meti; Lorena	Not eligible	Graciano; Gerta	Graciano; Arbër	Grandiola	Gerta; Grandiola	Erion	Dritan	Françeska	Arbër	Fifth Place (Day 99)		6
Erion	Not eligible	Nominated	No nominations	Elvis	Vlashi; Liam	Vlashi; Edgar	Lorena; Edgar	Not eligible	Lorena; Edgar	Nominated	Edgar; Meti	Dritan; Arbër	Not eligible	Gerta; Dritan	Not eligible	Dritan	Gentiana	Liam	Evicted (Day 92)		9
Gerta	Not in House							Exempt		Gentiana	Françeska; Edgar	Liam	Grandiola	Graciano; Dritan	Not eligible	Gentiana	Gentiana	Evicted (Day 85)			10
Dritan	Not in House							Exempt		Erion	Edgar; Meti	Arbër; Liam	Grandiola	Grandiola; Gerta	Not eligible	Gentiana	Françeska	Evicted (Day 85)			9
Graciano	Not eligible	Nominated	No nominations	Not eligible	Doloreza; Arbër	Ermira; Arbër	Vlashi; Anila	Nominated	Meti; Edgar	Ermal	Grandiola; Arbër	Liam; Arbër	Grandiola; Erion	Liam; Gerta	Nominated	Gerta	Evicted (Day 78)				5
Grandiola	Not in House							Exempt		Ermal	Arbër; Edgar	Graciano	Nominated	Liam; Arbër	Evicted (Day 71)						11
Edgar	Not eligible	Nominated	No nominations	Graciano	Françeska; Arbër	Lorena; Anila	Anila; Erion	Not eligible	Erion; Meti	Erion	Meti; Arbër	Erion; Arbër	Evicted (Day 64)								16
Meti	Nominated		No nominations	Elvis	Doloreza; Ermila	Edgar; Vlashi	Anila; Lorena	Not eligible	Lorena; Edgar	Gentiana	Edgar; Dritan	Evicted (Day 57)									12
Lorena	Not in House			Nominated	Arbër; Doloreza	Ermal; Françeska	Vlashi; Erion	Nominated	Meti; Erion	Evicted (Day 50)											20
Anila	Nominated	Not eligible	No nominations	Not eligible	Klaudja; Françeska	Klaudja; Ermira	Edgar; Vlashi	Nominated	Evicted (Day 43)												17
Vlashi	Not in House			Exempt	Klaudja; Erion	Klaudja; Anila	Anila; Lorena	Evicted (Day 43)													6
Klaudja	Not in House		No nominations	Graciano	Anila; Liam	Edgar; Anila	Anila; Lorena	Walked (Day 43)													7
Ermira	Not in House			Nominated	Arbër; Doloreza	Arbër; Anila	Evicted (Day 36)														5
Doloreza	Not in House			Exempt	Ermira; Françeska	Evicted (Day 29)															6
Elvis	Not eligible	Nominated	No nominations	Not eligible	Evicted (Day 22)																0
Arjola	Nominated	Not eligible	No nominations	Evicted (Day 15)																	N/A
Florian	Not eligible	Nominated	No nominations	Evicted (Day 15)																	N/A
Albulena	Nominated	Not eligible	No nominations	Evicted (Day 15)																	N/A
Gjon	Not eligible	Nominated	Evicted (Day 8)																		N/A
Emirjeta	Nominated	Evicted (Day 8)																			N/A
Besarda	Walked (Day 2)																				N/A
Notes			,		none				none										none		
Up for eviction	Albulena; Anila; Arjola; Emirjeta; Gentiana	Edgar; Elvis; Ermal; Erion; Florian; Gjon; Graciano; Liam	All; Housemates	Anila; Elvis; Françeska	Arbër; Doloreza; Klaudja; Liam	Anila; Edgar; Ermira; Graciano; Klaudja; Lorena	Anila; Edgar; Lorena; Vlashi	Anila; Graciano; Lorena	Lorena; Meti	Arbër; Edgar; Erion; Meti		Arbër; Dritan; Edgar	Grandiola	Dritan; Gerta; Graciano; Grandiola	Gentiana; Graciano		Arbër; Dritan; Gentiana; Gerta; Liam	Erion; Françeska; Gentiana	Arbër; Ermal; Fraçeska; Gentiana; Liam		
Up for eviction	Meti		All; Housemates	Ermira; Lorena	Arbër; Doloreza; Klaudja; Liam	Anila; Edgar; Ermira; Graciano; Klaudja; Lorena	Anila; Edgar; Lorena; Vlashi	Anila; Graciano; Lorena	Lorena; Meti	Arbër; Edgar; Erion; Meti		Arbër; Dritan; Edgar	Grandiola	Dritan; Gerta; Graciano; Grandiola	Gentiana; Graciano		Arbër; Dritan; Gentiana; Gerta; Liam	Erion; Françeska; Gentiana	Arbër; Ermal; Fraçeska; Gentiana; Liam		
Walked	Besarda		none				Klaudja		none												
Evicted	Emirjeta; 7% to save	Gjon; 4.8% to save	Albulena; 1.3% to save	Elvis; 47% to evict	Doloreza; 44% to evict	Ermira; 42% to evict	Vlashi; 34% to evict	Anila; Fewest votes to save	Lorena; 62% to evict	Meti; Most votes to evict		Edgar; Most votes to evict	Grandiola; 69% to save	Grandiola; Most votes to evict	Graciano; Most votes to evict		Dritan; Most votes to evict	Erion; Most votes to evict	Ermal; Fewest votes (out of 5)	Françeska; Fewest votes (out of 5)	
Evicted	Meti; 94.6% to save		Florian; 2.4% to save	Ermira & Lorena; 75% to save	Doloreza; 44% to evict	Ermira; 42% to evict	Vlashi; 34% to evict	Anila; Fewest votes to save	Lorena; 62% to evict	Meti; Most votes to evict		Edgar; Most votes to evict	Grandiola; 69% to save	Grandiola; Most votes to evict	Graciano; Most votes to evict		Gerta; Most votes to evict	Erion; Most votes to evict	Gentiana; Fewest votes (out of 3)	Liam; Fewest votes (out of 2)	
Evicted	Meti; 94.6% to save		Arjola; 3.2% to save	Ermira & Lorena; 75% to save	Doloreza; 44% to evict	Ermira; 42% to evict	Vlashi; 34% to evict	Anila; Fewest votes to save	Lorena; 62% to evict	Meti; Most votes to evict		Edgar; Most votes to evict	Grandiola; 69% to save	Grandiola; Most votes to evict	Graciano; Most votes to evict		Gerta; Most votes to evict	Erion; Most votes to evict	Arbër; Most votes to win		

=== Notes ===
- ^Note 1: Gentiana was chosen by Big Brother to evict one of three boys: Meti, Ermal or Elvis. She evicted Meti and then the public voted whether Meti should stay in the house or should be evicted. 94.6% of the public voted for Meti to stay in the house. Then all girls were nominated and the public voted for its favorite housemate. Emirjeta had the smallest percentage of votes (7%), so she left the house. After that, all boys were nominated and the boy with the smallest percentage of votes was Gjon.
- ^Note 2: All of the housemates were nominated for eviction and the three housemates with the fewest votes would be evicted and four others would be nominated. As Albulena, Florian, and Arjola received the fewest votes to save (1.3%, 2.4%, and 3.2%) they were all evicted while Anila, Elvis, Franceska and Graciano were nominated. Other housemates voted to save a housemate from being nominated. Graciano had three votes from other housemates, so he was saved.
- ^Note 3: Ermira and Lorena were not official housemates and for this reason, the public voted to decide if they should stay or leave the house. Finally, they were saved with 75% of public votes.
- ^Note 4: Graciano was automatically nominated by the rest of the housemates.
- ^Note 5: The public voted for its favorite housemate. Ermal, Arbër, Graciano, Gentiana, Liam and Klaudja were voted the favorite housemates of the public so they could not be nominated for two weeks.
- ^Note 6: All housemates except the exempt housemates and the new ones were nominated. The exempt housemates, Arbër, Ermal, Liam and Genta, had to save a nominated housemate. The not saved housemates were Anila, Graciano and Lorena.
- ^Note 7: The housemates voted to nominate between Erion, Ermal and Gentiana as they never were nominated. Erion was the first nominee. Gentiana and Ermal were exempt next round.
- ^Note 8: This round the female housemates were immune and they have to save a male housemate. The male who was not saved was nominated.
- ^Note 9: Graciano had to choose his two best friends in the house to be nominated. He chose Erion and Grandiola. Then, the rest of the housemates had to choose who should be up for elimination. Grandiola received most votes.
- ^Note 10: Housemates had to choose the first nominee between less favourite housemates Dritan, Erion, Gentiana, Gerta and Graciano.
- ^Note 11: Arbër, Dritan, Gerta and Liam were automatically nominated by Big Brother for discussion about nominations.
- ^Note 12: In this round there were at least two nominees, one by the public and the other by the housemates. Erion was chosen by the public.
