= Big Brother Albania season 8 =

Season of an Albanian television series

Big Brother Albania
- Season 8
- Presented by: Ledion Liço
- No. of days: 99
- No. of housemates: 22
- Winner: Vesel Kurtishaj
- Runner-up: Alba Çobaj

Release
- Original network: Top Channel
- Original release: March 7 – June 13, 2015

Season chronology
- ← Previous; Season 7 Next → Season 9

Big Brother Albania 8 was the eighth season of the Albanian television series of the worldwide franchise of Big Brother. The premiere for this season was 7 March 2015. The main topic of this season is the host Arbana Osmani will not return for another season due to pregnancy. The main host will be Ledion Liço, while Albana Osmani hosted the Sunday morning show, featuring dialogues with eliminated contestants and fans of the show. The show ran for 99 days, and the winner was Vesel Kurtishaj. He received a 15,000,000 lekë (€100,000) prize.

== Housemates ==
Housemates	Age	Entered	Exited	Status
Vesel Kurtishaj	23	Day 43	Day 99	Winner
Alba Çobaj	24	Day 1	Day 99	Runner-Up
Fatjon Hysenbelliu	25	Day 1	Day 99	Third Place
Eleonora Toti	43	Day 1	Day 99	Fourth Place
Xhensila Pere	25	Day 1	Day 99	Fifth Place
Fabian Kaja	31	Day 1	Day 99	Sixth Place
Tea Zhuli	22	Day 1	Day 92	Evicted
Kristi Becka	24	Day 29	Day 85	Evicted
Fisnik	27	Day 9	Day 78	Evicted
Milena		Day 50	Day 71	Evicted
Diedon Musa	26	Day 1	Day 64	Evicted
Marsuela	34	Day 29	Day 57	Evicted
Maria	33	Day 9	Day 50	Evicted
Zaida Cobo	35	Day 1	Day 50	Evicted
Marina Kaja	26	Day 1	Day 43	Evicted
Stilian Pashaj	29	Day 1	Day 36	Evicted
Genci Danaj	19	Day 1	Day 29	Evicted
Kika	27	Day 1	Day 22	Ejected
Jonida	20	Day 1	Day 22	Evicted
Kreshnik		Day 1	Day 15	Evicted
Sokol	32	Day 1	Day 8	Ejected
Edison	33	Day 1	Day 7	Walked

== Nominations table ==
This season followed the same twist as Big Brother 11 (Australia), in which housemates were paired and together they had to nominate and be evicted.

		Week 1	Week 2	Week 3	Week 4	Week 5	Week 6	Week 7		Week 8	Week 9	Week 10	Week 11	Week 12	Week 13	Final Week 14	
		Week 1	Week 2	Week 3	Week 4	Week 5	Week 6	Day 43	Day 50	Week 8	Week 9	Week 10	Week 11	Week 12	Week 13	Final Week 14	
Vesel		Not in House						Exempt	No; Nominations	4-Fisnik; 1-Alba	3-Fisnik; 2-Tea	Nominated	3-Xhensila; 2-Alba	4-Kristi; 1-Fatjon	4-Fatjon; 1-Tea	Winner (Day 99)	
	Alba	No; Nominations	3-Eleonora & Marina; 2-Tea & Genci	3-Jonida & Diedon; 2-Maria & Fisnik	Nominated	3-Fatjon; 2-Fabian	Nominated	3-Fabian; 2-Fatjon	No; Nominations	4-Marsuela; 1-Kristi	3-Kristi; 2-Fatjon	Exempt	3-Fabian; 2-Xhensila	3-Kristi; 2-Tea	4-Fatjon; 1-Xhensila	Runner-Up (Day 99)	
	Fatjon	No; Nominations	3-Tea & Genci; 2-Zaida & Xhensila	3-Jonida & Diedon; 2-Zaida & Xhensila	No; Nominations	4-Stilian; 1-Tea	No; Nominations	3-Diedon; 2-Eleonora	No; Nominations	4-Alba; 1-Kristi	3-Alba; 2-Eleonora	Nominated	4-Alba; 1-Eleonora	3-Vesel; 2-Alba	3-Vesel; 2-Alba	Third Place (Day 99)	
	Eleonora	No; Nominations	3-Zaida & Xhensila; 2-Tea & Genci	3-Zaida & Xhensila; 2-Jonida & Diedon	No; Nominations	3-Fatjon; 2-Zaida	Nominated	3-Marsuela; 2-Zaida	No; Nominations	3-Fatjon; 2-Xhensila	4-Fatjon; 1-Xhensila	Nominated	3-Tea; 2-Xhensila	3-Tea; 2-Kristi	4-Fatjon; 1-Tea	Fourth Place (Day 99)	
1	Xhensila	No; Nominations	4-Eleonora & Marina; 1-Jonida & Diedon	4-Eleonora & Marina; 1-Jonida & Diedon	No; Nominations	4-Zaida; 1-Stilian	Nominated	3-Fabian; 2-Marsuela	No; Nominations	3-Alba; 2-Fabian	4-Eleonora; 1-Diedon	Nominated	4-Alba; 1-Kristi	2-Vesel; 3-Tea	4-Alba; 1-Tea	Fifth Place (Day 99)	
	Fabian	No; Nominations	3-Tea & Genci; 2-Zaida & Xhensila	3-Jonida & Diedon; 2-Zaida & Xhensila	No; Nominations	4-Xhensila; 1-Tea	No; Nominations	3-Maria; 2-Alba	No; Nominations	2-Alba; 3-Tea	3-Tea; 2-Xhensila	Nominated	3-Tea; 2-Xhensila	3-Tea; 2-Xhensila	3-Tea; 2-Xhensila	Sixth Place (Day 99)	
	Tea	No; Nominations	3-Eleonora & Marina; 2-Zaida & Xhensila	3-Eleonora & Marina; 2-Zaida & Xhensila	Nominated	4-Zaida; 1-Fabian	Nominated	3-Zaida; 2-Marsuela	No; Nominations	4-Marsuela; 1-Fabian	3-Diedon; 2-Fabian	Nominated	4-Fabian; 1-Kristi	4-Eleonora; 1-Fabian	4-Fatjon; 1-Alba	Evicted (Day 92)	
Kristi		Not in House				Exempt	No; Nominations	3-Fisnik; 2-Alba	No; Nominations	2-Vesel; 3-Fisnik	2-Diedon; 3-Fisnik	Exempt	4-Alba; 1-Eleonora	4-Fabian; 1-Vesel	Evicted (Day 85)		
	Fisnik	Not in House	Exempt	3-Zaida & Xhensila; 2-Alba & Kika	No; Nominations	3-Zaida; 2-Marina	Nominated	3-Diedon; 2-Zaida	No; Nominations	3-Diedon; 2-Kristi	3-Kristi; 2-Diedon	Nominated	4-Alba; 1-Kristi	Evicted (Day 78)			
Milena		Not in House							No; Nominations	3-Marsuela; 2-Xhensila	3-Xhensila; 2-Vesel	Nominated	Evicted (Day 71)				
	Diedon	No; Nominations	3-Alba & Kika; 2-Eleonora & Marina	3-Tea & Genci; 2-Zaida & Xhensila	Nominated	4-Fatjon; 1-Marina	No; Nominations	3-Fatjon; 2-Xhensila	No; Nominations	3-Fatjon; 2-Marsuela	3-Kristi; 2-Fatjon	Evicted (Day 64)					
Marsuela		Not in House				Exempt	Nominated	3-Maria; 2-Eleonora	No; Nominations	3-Alba; 2-Eleonora	Evicted (Day 57)						
	Maria	Not in House	Exempt	3-Zaida & Xhensila; 2-Alba & Kika	No; Nominations	4-Zaida; 1-Fabian	Nominated	3-Zaida; 2-Fabian	No; Nominations	Evicted (Day 50)							
1	Zaida	No; Nominations	4-Eleonora & Marina; 1-Jonida & Diedon	4-Eleonora & Marina; 1-Jonida & Diedon	No; Nominations	3-Eleonora; 2-Tea	Nominated	3-Maria; 2-Eleonora	Evicted (Day 50)								
	Marina	No; Nominations	3-Zaida & Xhensila; 2-Tea & Genci	3-Zaida & Xhensila; 2-Jonida & Diedon	No; Nominations	3-Fisnik; 2-Maria	Nominated	Evicted (Day 43)									
	Stilian	No; Nominations	2-Jonida & Diedon; 3-Zaida & Xhensila	Secret; Room	No; Nominations	3-Zaida; 2-Fatjon	Evicted (Day 36)										
	Genci	No; Nominations	3-Eleonora & Marina; 2-Zaida & Xhensila	3-Eleonora & Marina; 2-Zaida & Xhensila	Nominated	Evicted (Day 29)											
	Kika	No; Nominations	3-Eleonora & Marina; 2-Tea & Genci	3-Jonida & Diedon; 2-Maria & Fisnik	Ejected (Day 22)												
	Jonida	No; Nominations	3-Alba & Kika; 2-Eleonora & Marina	3-Tea & Genci; 2-Zaida & Xhensila	Evicted (Day 22)												
	Kreshnik	No; Nominations	2-Jonida & Diedon; 3-Zaida & Xhensila	Evicted (Day 15)													
	Sokol	No; Nominations	Ejected (Day 8)														
	Edison	No; Nominations	Walked (Day 7)														
Notes		1	2, 3	2, 4	5	6	7	6, 8	9	6, 10	6, 11	12	6, 13	6	6, 14	15	
Up for eviction		none	Stilian; Kreshnik; Eleonora; Marina; Xhensila; Zaida; Tea; Genci	Diedon; Jonida; Eleonora; Marina; Xhensila; Zaida	Alba; Diedon; Genci; Tea	Fatjon; Stilian; Zaida	Alba; Eleonora; Fisnik; Maria; Marina; Marsuela; Tea; Xhensila; Zaida	Diedon; Eleonora; Fabian; Kristi; Marsuela; Xhensila; Zaida	All; Housemates	Alba; Fatjon; Fisnik; Marsuela; Milena	Alba; Diedon; Eleonora; Fabian; Fatjon; Fisnik; Kristi; Milena; Tea; Vesel; Xhensila	Eleonora; Fabian; Fatjon; Fisnik; Milena; Tea; Vesel; Xhensila	Alba; Fatjon; Fisnik	Fabian; Kristi; Tea; Vesel	Alba; Fatjon; Tea	Alba; Eleonora; Fabian; Fatjon; Vesel; Xhensila	
Ejected		Sokol	none	Kika	none												
Walked		Edison	none														
Evicted		No; Eviction	Kreshnik; Most votes to evict	Jonida; Most votes to evict	Genci; Most votes to evict	Stilian; Most votes to evict	Marina; Most votes to evict	Zaida; Most votes to evict	Maria; Most votes to evict	Marsuela; Most votes to evict	Diedon; Most votes to evict	Milena; Most votes to evict	Fisnik; Most votes to evict	Kristi; Most votes to evict	Tea; Most votes to evict	Fabian; Fewest votes (out of 6)	Xhensila; Fewest votes (out of 6)
Evicted		No; Eviction	Kreshnik; Most votes to evict	Jonida; Most votes to evict	Genci; Most votes to evict	Stilian; Most votes to evict	Marina; Most votes to evict	Zaida; Most votes to evict	Maria; Most votes to evict	Marsuela; Most votes to evict	Diedon; Most votes to evict	Milena; Most votes to evict	Fisnik; Most votes to evict	Kristi; Most votes to evict	Tea; Most votes to evict	Eleonora; Fewest votes (out of 6)	Fatjon; Fewest votes (out of 3)
Evicted		No; Eviction	Kreshnik; Most votes to evict	Jonida; Most votes to evict	Genci; Most votes to evict	Stilian; Most votes to evict	Marina; Most votes to evict	Zaida; Most votes to evict	Maria; Most votes to evict	Marsuela; Most votes to evict	Diedon; Most votes to evict	Milena; Most votes to evict	Fisnik; Most votes to evict	Kristi; Most votes to evict	Tea; Most votes to evict	Alba; Fewest votes (out of 2)	Vesel; Most votes to win

- Nominated forever

=== Notes ===
- ^Note 1: Although her pair was walked, Zaida continued to be the Head of House. On Day 8, Sokol was also ejected. Because of this, Zaida and Xhensila were left without pair and had the option to become a new pair. They accepted it.
- ^Note 2: Similar to Big Brother Australia, each pair had to distribute 5 points between 2 other pairs. However, housemates up for eviction have individual numbers and not with their pairs.
- ^Note 3: Stilian and Kreshnik were automatically nominated as a result of breaking the rules.
- ^Note 4: While his pair was evicted, Big Brother decided to send Stilian to a Secret Room. The other housemates think he was evicted too.
- ^Note 5: This week there were no nominations, and Alba, Diedon, Genci and Tea were automatically nominated. They were nominated because of their behaviour during the week and being involved on Kika's ejection, having provoked him to have bad behaviour and being ejected.
- ^Note 6: Similar to Big Brother Australia, each housemate had to distribute 5 points between 2 other housemates.
- ^Note 7: All the female housemates and Fisnik were automatically nominated. Fisnik was automatically nominated because his group failed the week task, so the other group had to nominate one of the other (Diedon, Eleonora, Fisnik or Stilian). All the girls were automatically nominated because there's more girls in the house than guys, and a guy was already nominated.
- ^Note 8: This week there was a twist, in which the housemates were divided in groups for the weekly last and whoever had the most points would see its group facing eviction. Zaida received the most points, therefore Eleonora, Diedon, Fabian, Kristi, Marsuela and Xhenaila are up for eviction as well.
- ^Note 9: In a double eviction night, all housemates were nominated for the second round. The one with the most votes was evicted.
- ^Note 10: As Milena entered on Day 50, Big Brother decided that she is nominates for the whole season.
- ^Note 11: Whoever had at least 2 points in this nominations was nominated. As everyone had at least 2 points, Big Brother announced everyone was nominated this week.
- ^Note 12: Alba and Kristi won immunity in the weekly task. All the other housemates were nominated for eviction.
- ^Note 13: Fatjon and Fisnik were automatically nominated due to rule breaking.
- ^Note 14: This week, whoever had at least 5 points was nominated.
- ^Note 15: The public voted to win rather than to evict.
