= Big Brother Albania season 4 =

Season of an Albanian television series

Big Brother Albania
- Season 4
- Presented by: Arbana Osmani
- No. of days: 99
- No. of housemates: 26
- Winner: Ermela Mezuraj
- Runner-up: Ergys

Release
- Original network: Top Channel
- Original release: 25 December 2010 – 2 April 2011

Season chronology
- ← Previous; Season 3 Next → Season 5

Big Brother Albania 4 was the fourth season of the Albanian series of the worldwide franchise of Big Brother. It launched on Saturday, 25 December 2010, with fifteen Housemates entering the House. The winner received a 10,000,000 lekë (€75,000) prize. Ermela Mezuraj, a 24-year-old social worker from Tirana won the fourth edition of Big Brother Albania, and in doing so she was the first female winner of the show. Big Brother 4 (Albania) aired on two cable channels 24 hours a day on the Digit-Alb cable network, as well as on two additional channels on DigitAlb Mobile. Daily reviews were shown Monday through Saturday on Top Channel. The eviction show aired on Saturdays at 21:00 CET, while a Sunday edition closed off the week. The main host is Arbana Osmani, while Eno Popi hosted the Sunday morning edition called "Big Brother Albania Fans' Club", featuring dialogues with eliminated contestants and fans of the show. Blendi Salaj, a young publicist, blogger and radio morning show host took over the role of the panelist. The panelist asked Housemates questions regarding their life in the Big Brother house, helping to provide the public with deeper insights. The Big Brother Forum didn't return this year.

== Housemates ==
Sixteen housemates entered the house on Day 1. On Day 8 five new housemates entered the house. On Day 22, Edison, Jonela, Faton, Petrit And Shkelqim entered the house.

Housemates	Age	Entered	Exited	Status
Ermela	24	Day 8	Day 99	Winner
Ergys	24	Day 1	Day 99	Runner-Up
Ogren	26	Day 1	Day 99	Third Place
Mariel	23	Day 1	Day 99	Fourth Place
Neda	20	Day 1	Day 92	Evicted
Mirjeta	23	Day 1	Day 92	Evicted
Alma	29	Day 1	Day 85	Evicted
Klodiana	19	Day 1	Day 78	Evicted
Petrit	23	Day 22	Day 78	Evicted
Shkelqim	30	Day 22	Day 71	Evicted
Jonela	21	Day 22	Day 64	Evicted
Algen	34	Day 8	Day 57	Evicted
Klaudia	20	Day 8	Day 50	Evicted
Alkena	22	Day 1	Day 43	Evicted
Ervin	33	Day 8	Day 36	Evicted
Edison	24	Day 22	Day 33	Ejected
Emiljo	28	Day 1	Day 29	Evicted
Elisa	22	Day 8	Day 29	Evicted
Faton	26	Day 22	Day 25	Walked
Toros	37	Day 1	Day 22	Evicted
Kreshnik	25	Day 8	Day 15	Evicted
Hënes	24	Day 1	Day 15	Evicted
Olger	26	Day 1	Day 8	Evicted
Vladimir	42	Day 1	Day 8	Evicted
Fatjona	22	Day 1	Day 8	Evicted
Imelda	25	Day 1	Day 8	Evicted

== Nominations table ==
	Week 1	Week 2	Week 3		Week 4	Week 5	Week 6	Week 7	Week 8	Week 9	Week 10		Week 11	Week 12	Week 13		Final	
Ermela	Not in House	Nominated	Algen	Klaudia; Klodiana	Elisa; Emiljo	Algen; Alma	Alkena; Klaudia	Alma; Klaudia	Klodiana; Mirjeta	Klodiana; Mirjeta	Petrit; Shkelqim	Klodiana	Petrit; Klodiana	Neda; Alma	Mirjeta; Neda	Nominated	Winner (Day 99)	
Ergys	No nominations	Neda; Ogren	Algen	Ermela; Toros	Ermela; Ervin	Alma; Algen	Alma; Neda	Alma; Klaudia	Algen; Ogren	Ogren; Neda	Neda; Ermela	Neda	Neda; Ogren	Ogren; Neda	Ogren; Neda	Nominated	Runner-Up (Day 99)	
Ogren	No nominations	Hënes; Toros	Algen	Ervin; Toros	Ermela; Ervin	Ergys; Ermela	Alkena; Alma	Algen; Ermela	Algen; Shkelqim	Alma; Jonela	Alma; Klodiana	Klodiana	Alma; Klodiana	Klodiana; Alma	Ergys; Mirjeta	Nominated	Third Place (Day 99)	
Mariel	No nominations	Alkena; Emiljo	Algen	Elisa; Ermela	Elisa; Ermela	Algen; Ermela	Jonela; Alkena	Algen; Ermela	Algen; Petrit	Ermela; Jonela	Ermela; Klodiana	Ermela	Ermela; Petrit	Ermela; Neda	Ermela; Neda	Nominated	Fourth Place (Day 99)	
Neda	No nominations	Emiljo; Hënes	Algen	Emiljo; Toros	Elisa; Emiljo	Ermela; Ervin	Jonela; Mirjeta	Ermela; Jonela	Klodiana; Mirjeta	Jonela; Ermela	Ergys; Shkelqim	Klodiana	Klodiana; Petrit	Klodiana; Alma	Mirjeta; Ergys	Nominated	Evicted (Day 92)	
Mirjeta	No nominations	Emiljo; Hënes	Ermela	Ermela; Ervin	Ermela; Ervin	Petrit; Ervin	Jonela; Neda	Klaudia; Neda	Alma; Neda	Jonela; Ermela	Shkelqim; Petrit	Neda	Alma; Neda	Neda; Ogren	Ermela; Neda	Evicted (Day 92)		
Alma	No nominations	Hënes; Toros	Algen	Elisa; Ermela	Elisa; Ermela	Ermela; Ervin	Jonela; Klaudia	Algen; Ergys	Ermela; Jonela	Ogren; Ermela	Ergys; Petrit	Ermela	Ogren; Ermela	Ermela; Ogren	Evicted (Day 85)			
Klodiana	No nominations	Emiljo; Toros	Ermela	Ermela; Ervin	Ermela; Ervin	Ermela; Shkelqim	Alkena; Jonela	Neda; Shkelqim	Ermela; Neda	Ermela; Jonela	Petrit; Shkelqim	Ermela	Neda; Ogren	Neda; Ogren	Evicted (Day 78)			
Petrit	Not in House					Algen; Edison	Alkena; Jonela	Algen; Jonela	Algen; Ogren	Ermela; Jonela	Ermela; Neda	Ermela	Ermela; Ogren	Evicted (Day 78)				
Shkelqim	Not in House					Edison; Klodiana	Klodiana; Jonela	Klodiana; Mirjeta	Petrit; Ogren	Ogren; Klodiana	Ermela; Mirjeta	Evicted (Day 71)						
Jonela	Not in House					Edison; Shkelqim	Alkena; Neda	Alma; Petrit	Alma; Neda	Ogren; Alma	Evicted (Day 64)							
Algen	Not in House	Nominated	Ermela	Alma; Ogren	Ergys; Ermela	Edison; Ermela	Alma; Neda	Alma; Neda	Mariel; Ogren	Evicted (Day 57)								
Klaudia	Not in House	Nominated	Ermela	Ermela; Toros	Ermela; Ervin	Ermela; Ervin	Alkena; Klodiana	Algen; Ermela	Evicted (Day 50)									
Alkena	No nominations	Emiljo; Toros	Toros	Ermela; Ervin	Ermela; Ervin	Ermela; Ervin	Jonela; Klaudia	Evicted (Day 43)										
Ervin	Not in House	Nominated	Algen	Elisa; Klaudia	Elisa; Emiljo	Algen; Alma	Evicted (Day 36)											
Edison	Not in House					Algen; Shkelqim	Ejected (Day 33)											
Emiljo	No nominations	Hënes; Toros	Ermela	Ermela; Ervin	Ermela; Ervin	Evicted (Day 29)												
Elisa	Not in House	Nominated	Ermela	Emiljo; Ermela	Ermela; Ervin	Evicted (Day 29)												
Faton	Not in House					Walked (Day 25)												
Toros	No nominations	Alkena; Alma	Alma	Alkena; Mirjeta	Evicted (Day 22)													
Kreshnik	Not in House	Nominated	Evicted (Day 15)															
Hënes	No nominations	Emiljo; Ogren	Evicted (Day 15)															
Olger	No nominations	Evicted (Day 8)																
Vladimir	No nominations	Evicted (Day 8)																
Fatjona	No nominations	Evicted (Day 8)																
Imelda	Nominated	Evicted (Day 8)																
Notes						none		none			none		none					
Nominated For Eviction	Imelda	Emiljo; Hënes; Toros	Algen; Ermela	Algen; Ermela; Ervin; Toros	Algen; Elisa; Ermela; Ervin	Algen; Ermela; Ervin	Alkena; Jonela; Neda	Algen; Alma; Ermela; Klaudia; Neda	Algen; Alma; Ermela; Klodiana; Mirjeta; Neda; Ogren	Ergys; Ermela; Jonela; Ogren; Petrit; Shkelqim	Ermela; Klodiana; Neda; Petrit; Shkelqim	Ermela	Ermela; Klodiana; Neda; Ogren; Petrit	Ergys; Ermela; Klodiana; Mariel; Mirjeta	Ergys; Ermela; Mirjeta; Neda	All; Housemates	All; Housemates	
Nominated For Eviction	All; Housemates	Algen; Elisa; Ermela; Ervin; Klaudia; Kreshnik	Algen; Ermela	Algen; Ermela; Ervin; Toros	Edison; Emiljo; Petrit	Algen; Ermela; Ervin	Alkena; Jonela; Neda	Algen; Alma; Ermela; Klaudia; Neda	Algen; Alma; Ermela; Klodiana; Mirjeta; Neda; Ogren	Ergys; Ermela; Jonela; Ogren; Petrit; Shkelqim	Ermela; Klodiana; Neda; Petrit; Shkelqim	Ermela	Ermela; Klodiana; Neda; Ogren; Petrit	Alma; Neda; Ogren	Ergys; Ermela; Mirjeta; Neda	All; Housemates	All; Housemates	
Walked	none				Faton	none												
Ejected	none					Edison	none											
Evicted	Imelda; 45% to save	Hënes; 45% to evict	Algen; 7 of 15 nominations	Toros; 36% to evict	Elisa; 34% to evict	Ervin; Most votes to evict	Alkena; 37% to evict	Klaudia; 32% to evict	Algen; 30% to evict	Jonela; 32% to evict	Shkelqim; 37% to evict	Ermela; 70% to save	Petrit; 28% to evict	Klodiana; Most votes to evict	Mirjeta; 34% to evict	Neda; 43% to evict	Mariel; Fewest votes (out of 4)	Ogren; Fewest votes (out of 3)
Evicted	Fatjona; 0.8% to save	Hënes; 45% to evict	Algen; 7 of 15 nominations	Toros; 36% to evict	Elisa; 34% to evict	Ervin; Most votes to evict	Alkena; 37% to evict	Klaudia; 32% to evict	Algen; 30% to evict	Jonela; 32% to evict	Shkelqim; 37% to evict	Ermela; 70% to save	Petrit; 28% to evict	Klodiana; Most votes to evict	Mirjeta; 34% to evict	Neda; 43% to evict	Mariel; Fewest votes (out of 4)	Ogren; Fewest votes (out of 3)
Evicted	Vladimir; 1.1% to save	Kreshnik; 7.6% to save	Algen; 7 of 15 nominations	Toros; 36% to evict	Emiljo; Most votes to evict	Ervin; Most votes to evict	Alkena; 37% to evict	Klaudia; 32% to evict	Algen; 30% to evict	Jonela; 32% to evict	Shkelqim; 37% to evict	Ermela; 70% to save	Petrit; 28% to evict	Alma; 36% to evict	Mirjeta; 34% to evict	Neda; 43% to evict	Ergys; Fewest votes (out of 2)	Ermela; Most votes to win
Evicted	Olger; 1.5% to save	Kreshnik; 7.6% to save	Algen; 7 of 15 nominations	Toros; 36% to evict	Emiljo; Most votes to evict	Ervin; Most votes to evict	Alkena; 37% to evict	Klaudia; 32% to evict	Algen; 30% to evict	Jonela; 32% to evict	Shkelqim; 37% to evict	Ermela; 70% to save	Petrit; 28% to evict	Alma; 36% to evict	Mirjeta; 34% to evict	Neda; 43% to evict	Ergys; Fewest votes (out of 2)	Ermela; Most votes to win

=== Notes ===
- ^Note 1: From the beginning of the first live eviction show all of the housemates were automatically nominated for eviction. The three housemates who received the fewest votes to save would be evicted. Shortly before this took place, Imelda, having been automatically put up for the public vote, was evicted from the house.
- ^Note 2: Before the eviction in week two, the housemates were told that they all had to vote for one of their fellow housemates that they would like to see be evicted from the house. As this was a fake vote and as Algen received the most votes he was automatically nominated two weeks in row.
- ^Note 3: Due to the growing gap between male and female housemates in the house, for nominations in week only female housemates (excluding Ermela) were eligible to be nominated.
- ^Note 4: Before round ten of nominations began, Big Brother put the four housemates who had yet to be nominated, Ergys, Mariel, Petrit and Shkelqim, up for a vote to save. The three who lost the vote would automatically be nominated for eviction. The voting results were as follows, Mariel received votes from Alma, Mirjeta, and Neda, Sheklqim received votes from Ermela and Jonela, Ergys received a vote from Klodjana, and Petrit received no votes to save.
- ^Note 5: In round fourteen the nominations were done in secret with each housemate writing down on a sheet of paper who they wanted to nominate. Ermela received the most nominations with five and was up for eviction. The public then voted for whether they wanted to save or evict Ermela.
