= Big Brother Albania season 3 =

Season of an Albanian television series

Big Brother Albania
- Season 3
- Presented by: Arbana Osmani
- No. of days: 113
- No. of housemates: 22
- Winner: Jetmir Salaj
- Runner-up: Domenika

Release
- Original network: Top Channel
- Original release: 23 January – 15 May 2010

Season chronology
- ← Previous; Season 2 Next → Season 4

Big Brother Albania 3 was the third season of the Albanian series of the worldwide franchise of Big Brother. It launched on Saturday, 23 January 2010, with twelve Housemates entering the House. The winner, Jetmir Salaj received a 10,000,000 lekë (€75,000) prize. Big Brother 3 (Albania) aired on two cable channels 24 hours a day on the DigitAlb cable network, as well as on two additional channels on DigitAlb Mobile. Daily reviews were shown Monday through Saturday on Top Channel. The eviction show aired on Saturdays at 21:00 CET, while a Sunday edition will close off the week. The main host is Arbana Osmani, while Eno Popi hosted the Sunday morning edition called Big Brother Albania Fans' Club, featuring dialogues with eliminated contestants and fans of the show. The Big Brother Forum also returned this year. This season will end up as the longest of all series running 113 days and ending on Saturday 15 May 2010.

== Housemates ==
Housemates	Age	Entered	Exited	Status
Jetmir	26	Day 1	Day 113	Winner
Domenika	24	Day 1	Day 113	Runner-Up
Erion	25	Day 1	Day 113	Third Place
Klodian	35	Day 22	Day 113	Fourth Place
Eridiona	24	Day 78	Day 113	Evicted
Armand	34	Day 57	Day 106	Evicted
Haki	34	Day 1	Day 99	Evicted
Seldi	23	Day 1	Day 99	Evicted
Manal	21	Day 57	Day 92	Evicted
Tatiana	25	Day 57	Day 85	Evicted
Olta	22	Day 1	Day 78	Evicted
Eduard	37	Day 1	Day 71	Evicted
Bertina	25	Day 1	Day 64	Evicted
Ada	27	Day 22	Day 57	Evicted
Valon	20	Day 22	Day 57	Evicted
Rrezarta	21	Day 22	Day 50	Evicted
Bledar	36	Day 22	Day 43	Evicted
Graciela	27	Day 1	Day 36	Evicted
Renato	23	Day 15	Day 29	Evicted
Pamela	23	Day 1	Day 22	Evicted
Valentina	49	Day 1	Day 15	Evicted
Gjimi	29	Day 1	Day 13	Ejected

== Controversies ==
This season of Big Brother had a lot of controversies starting from Klodian's coming out as gay. In one of the Saturday's shows there was shown a clip for both the housemates and the public of Klodian in the diary room telling that he was gay. Arbana called Klodian in the diary room to talk more about his sexual orientation. When he came out of the diary room all the housemates hugged him and told him that they would support him. But this thing didn't happen for some of the housemates, especially with Valon who claimed to be a homophobic and said that all the Albanians are as well. Two weeks after Klodian came out, in his hometown, Lezhë there were people protesting to Big Brother cast to draw Klodian out of the house. Klodian survived a lot of risks to be evicted and some people think that the voting may have been rigged to keep Klodian in the house until the situation in his hometown calm down. Also the American Ambassador and the European one showed their support to Klodian's family. The reactions from the magazines and the press were in the support of Klodian.

Right after the start of the fifth season of Big Brother Albania on Top Channel, the hostess of the show, Arbana Osmani made some really harsh comments about the cast of the housemates of the third season. Asked during an interview about which cast of housemates of which season she disliked the most, Osmani answered that she totally disliked and hated the cast of the third season because she thought that each and every one of the housemates of the third season were totally false and had no personality whatsoever. Osmani went on to say that Klodian Çela, according to her, was one of the worst people she had ever met and said that Çela used his homosexuality to make people feel bad about him. However, these comments weren't left unanswered by the other side. Shortly after the interview was published, Tatiana Sandei, one of the housemates of this season, stormed back at Osmani's comments defending herself, the cast of the third season and Klodian Çela, meanwhile Çela himself claimed to have been used by the production for his homosexuality and offended the hostess by making explicit comments. Klodian also claimed that the production of Big Brother offered to pay him just because he outed himself during the show although the payment was never made.

== Nominations table ==
	Week 2	Week 3	Week 4	Week 5	Week 6	Week 7	Week 8		Week 9	Week 10	Week 11	Week 12	Week 13	Week 14		Week 15	Week 16	Final	
Jetmir	Pamela; Valentina	Pamela; Seldi	Haki; Olta	Graciela; Haki	Bledar; Haki	Domenika; Olta	Ada; Klodian	Eduard	Klodian; Olta	Haki	Armand; Olta	Armand; Seldi	Domenika; Seldi	Armand; Haki	Armand; Eridiona	Armand; Eridiona	Erion	Winner (Day 113)	
Domenika	Bertina; Graciela	Graciela; Jetmir	Eduard; Olta	Erion; Haki	Erion; Jetmir	Jetmir; Rrezarta	Bertina; Valon	Seldi	Bertina; Haki	Olta	Haki; Manal	Armand; Tatiana	Armand; Manal	Haki; Jetmir	Haki; Jetmir	Armand; Jetmir	Klodian	Runner-Up (Day 113)	
Erion	Pamela; Valentina	Domenika; Pamela	Domenika; Eduard	Eduard; Klodian	Bledar; Eduard	Domenika; Olta	Klodian; Eduard	Exempt	Klodian; Olta	Jetmir	Domenika; Klodian	Haki; Seldi	Eridiona; Seldi	Eridiona; Seldi	Eridiona; Haki	Armand; Eridiona	Jetmir	Third Place (Day 113)	
Klodian	Not in House		Exempt	Ada; Haki	Haki; Valon	Bertina; Rrezarta	Bertina; Valon	Olta	Eduard; Haki	Armand	Haki; Jetmir	Haki; Tatiana	Jetmir; Haki	Erion; Seldi	Haki; Jetmir	Erion; Jetmir	Domenika	Fourth Place (Day 113)	
Eridiona	Not in House											Exempt	Jetmir; Manal	Haki; Jetmir	Erion; Jetmir	Erion; Jetmir	Domenika	Evicted (Day 113)	
Armand	Not in House								Exempt	Tatiana	Haki; Jetmir	Haki; Jetmir	Haki; Manal	Haki; Jetmir	Haki; Jetmir	Domenika; Jetmir	Evicted (Day 106)		
Haki	Olta; Valentina	Jetmir; Pamela	Eduard; Jetmir	Jetmir; Rrezarta	Bledar; Jetmir	Olta; Rrezarta	Domenika; Eduard	Exempt	Eduard; Olta	Jetmir	Klodian; Olta	Armand; Klodian	Armand; Klodian	Armand; Domenika	Eridiona; Jetmir	Evicted (Day 99)			
Seldi	Bertina; Graciela	Bertina; Graciela	Eduard; Olta	Erion; Graciela	Erion; Jetmir	Jetmir; Rrezarta	Jetmir; Valon	Exempt	Bertina; Jetmir	Olta	Jetmir; Manal	Jetmir; Tatiana	Jetmir; Manal	Erion; Jetmir	Evicted (Day 99)				
Manal	Not in House								Exempt	Jetmir; Olta	Armand; Olta	Armand; Seldi	Armand; Erion	Evicted (Day 92)					
Tatiana	Not in House								Exempt	Armand	Jetmir; Olta	Armand; Seldi	Evicted (Day 85)						
Olta	Pamela; Seldi	Jetmir; Seldi	Bertina; Jetmir	Bertina; Domenika	Jetmir; Valon	Bertina; Jetmir	Bertina; Valon	Exempt	Bertina; Haki	Seldi	Jetmir; Manal	Evicted (Day 78)							
Eduard	Olta; Valentina	Graciela; Olta	Renato; Seldi	Erion; Haki	Jetmir; Valon	Jetmir; Rrezarta	Haki; Jetmir	Nominated	Olta; Seldi	Domenika; Seldi	Evicted (Day 71)								
Bertina	Domenika; Valentina	Domenika; Pamela	Domenika; Renato	Klodian; Olta	Bledar; Seldi	Domenika; Olta	Domenika; Klodian	Erion	Klodian; Olta	Evicted (Day 64)									
Ada	Not in House		Exempt	Graciela; Olta	Haki; Jetmir	Rrezarta; Valon	Jetmir; Valon	Bertina; Eduard	Evicted (Day 57)										
Valon	Not in House		Exempt	Graciela; Klodian	Bledar; Seldi	Ada; Olta	Domenika; Olta	Haki	Evicted (Day 57)										
Rrezarta	Not in House		Exempt	Bertina; Haki	Bledar; Seldi	Domenika; Klodian	Evicted (Day 50)												
Bledar	Not in House		Exempt	Erion; Seldi	Erion; Haki	Evicted (Day 43)													
Graciela	Domenika; Valentina	Domenika; Seldi	Renato; Seldi	Bledar; Klodian	Evicted (Day 36)														
Renato	Not in House	Exempt	Graciela; Jetmir	Evicted (Day 29)															
Pamela	Bertina; Graciela	Bertina; Jetmir	Evicted (Day 22)																
Valentina	Graciela; Olta	Evicted (Day 15)																	
Gjimi	Bertina; Valentina	Ejected (Day 13)																	
Notes	none					none			none			none						none	
Nominated For Eviction	Bertina; Graciela; Valentina	Domenika; Graciela; Jetmir; Pamela; Seldi	Domenika; Eduard; Jetmir; Olta; Renato; Seldi	Erion; Graciela; Haki; Klodian	Bledar; Haki; Jetmir	Domenika; Jetmir; Olta; Rrezarta	Bertina; Domenika; Jetmir; Klodian; Valon	Ada; Bertina; Eduard	Bertina; Haki; Klodian; Olta	Eduard; Jetmir; Manal; Olta	Haki; Jetmir; Manal; Olta	Armand; Haki; Seldi; Tatiana	Armand; Jetmir; Manal	Armand; Erion; Haki; Jetmir; Seldi	Haki; Jetmir	Armand; Eridiona; Erion; Jetmir	Eridiona; Erion; Jetmir; Klodian	Domenika; Erion; Jetmir; Klodian	
Ejected	Gjimi																		
Evicted	Valentina; 70% to evict	Pamela; 38% to evict	Renato; 29% to evict	Graciela; 42% to evict	Bledar; 52% to evict	Rrezarta; 39% to evict	Valon; 42% to evict	Ada; Most votes to evict	Bertina; 33% to evict	Eduard; 46% to evict	Olta; 42% to evict	Tatiana; 38% to evict	Manal; 43% to evict	Seldi; 42% to evict	Haki; 52% to evict	Armand; 41% to evict	Eridiona; Most votes to evict	Klodian; 17% (out of 4)	Erion; 18% (out of 3)
Evicted	Valentina; 70% to evict	Pamela; 38% to evict	Renato; 29% to evict	Graciela; 42% to evict	Bledar; 52% to evict	Rrezarta; 39% to evict	Valon; 42% to evict	Ada; Most votes to evict	Bertina; 33% to evict	Eduard; 46% to evict	Olta; 42% to evict	Tatiana; 38% to evict	Manal; 43% to evict	Seldi; 42% to evict	Haki; 52% to evict	Armand; 41% to evict	Eridiona; Most votes to evict	Domenika; 26% (out of 2)	Jetmir; 39% to win

- Housemates living in the Rich House
- Housemates living in the Poor House

=== Notes ===
- ^Note 1: In round five of nominations all-female housemates were given immunity by Big Brother.
- ^Note 2: In round eight of nominations, all housemates that had been up for eviction in the previous round of nominations were asked to save one of the six that had not been up for eviction. Ada was the only housemate not to be saved and was thus automatically nominated for eviction. Following the vote, she was told to nominate two housemates that would be nominated with her. Ada chose to nominate Bertina and Eduard.
- ^Note 3: In round ten of nominations, all housemates apart from Eduard and Manal were split up into groups of three. Each person in the three groups was asked to nominate one person in their respective group that would join Eduard and Manal in being nominated for the next eviction.
- ^Note 4: In round eleven of nominations, each housemate had to open one of nine envelopes, one of which contained the power to keep one housemate from earning exemption. Seldi chose the envelope containing the power to prevent someone from the exemption and chose to give it to Eduard. As the last housemate to pick, Domenika was able to give either herself immunity or another housemate. She gave the immunity to Seldi.
- ^Note 5: In the final round of nominations, the housemates were each asked to name one person they wanted to see in the finals. The housemate who received the most votes was then immune from the final eviction. As Domenika received the most votes she automatically advanced to the final.
