= The Passport (2025 film) =

2025 Albanian romantic drama film

- Official film poster of The Passport
- Pasaporta
- Directed by: Eduart Grishaj
- Written by: Eduart Grishaj; Erion Kame
- Produced by: Eduart Grishaj (executive producer)
- Starring: Indri Shiroka; Kaona Sylejmani
- Cinematography: Djordje Stojiljkovic; Zoran Pecenkovic
- Edited by: Eduart Grishaj
- Music by: Yll Limani (original), Mardit Lleshi (theme)
- Production company: Seven Productions
- Distributed by: Seven Productions
- Release date: January 28, 2025
- Running time: 103 minutes
- Country: Albania
- Language: Albanian

The Passport (Albanian: Pasaporta) is a 2025 Albanian romantic drama film directed by Eduart Grishaj and produced by Seven Productions. The film stars Indri Shiroka and Kaona Sylejmani, and follows Edoni, an Albanian citizen, who attempts to migrate illegally to Canada and must travel with Vlera, a woman he does not know, pretending to be her husband, which leads to personal and emotional complications.

== Synopsis ==
Edoni, an Albanian citizen, attempts to migrate illegally to Canada. He contacts a criminal smuggling group, which arranges the journey using a fake Canadian passport. The arrangement requires him to travel with Vlera, a woman he does not know, and pretend to be her husband, which leads to personal and emotional complications during the trip.

== Cast ==
- Indri Shiroka as Edoni
- Kaona Sylejmani as Vlera
- Festim Bajcinca as Olsi
- Tan Brahimi as Eltoni
- Marieta Ljarja as Vera
- Mateo Curri as Besnik
- Arison Frani as Giuseppe
- Rafael Garcia as Pedro
- Anila Hoxha as Journalist
- Adem Karaga as Astrit
- Albert Kocaj as Bledi
- Krist Lleshi as Ana
- Arbana Osmani as TV host
- Gerti Palali as Waiter
- Eduardo Pina as Border police officer
- Willy Ramirez as Messicano
- Eclesio Ramos as Mexican singer
- Jozef Shiroka as Kristi
- Simon Shkreli as Tani
- Alfred Trebicka as The Boss
- Akil Varfi as Aldi
- Rosali Viana Vicente as Border police officer
- Romir Zalla as Shyqyri
- Arta Celaj as Vlera's friend

== Production ==
The Passport was produced by Seven Productions. Filming took place in Tirana, Albania (interiors), Mexico City and Tulum, Mexico (exteriors), as well as Milan and Lake Como, Italy (street and exterior scenes). Key crew included director and editor Eduart Grishaj, writers Eduart Grishaj and Erion Kame, cinematographers Djordje Stojiljkovic and Zoran Pecenkovic, and composers Yll Limani (original) and Mardit Lleshi (theme).

== Release ==
The film premiered in Albanian cinemas on 28 January 2025.

== Reception ==
Media coverage discussed the film's focus on the challenges of illegal immigration and the emotional complexities of forced travel arrangements. Reviews mentioned the interactions between the lead actors and the tension created by the smuggling plot.
