= Big Brother Albania =

Albanian reality competition and TV series

- The Big Brother 2017 logo
- Genre: Reality television
- Based on: Big Brother by John de Mol Jr.
- Presented by: Arbana Osmani; Ledion Liço
- Country of origin: Albania
- Original language: Albanian
- No. of seasons: 9

Original release
- Network: Top Channel
- Release: 23 February 2008 – 24 June 2017

Related
- Big Brother VIP

Big Brother Albania is the Albanian version of the Dutch reality competition franchise Big Brother created by producer John de Mol Jr. in 1997. It follows a number of contestants, known as housemates, who are isolated from the outside world for an extended period of time in a custom-built house. Each week, one of the housemates is evicted by a public vote, with the last housemate remaining winning a cash prize. The series started airing on 24 February 2008 on Top Channel and it has had nine seasons to date. Arbana Osmani hosted the first seven seasons and the ninth season. Ledion Liço hosted the eighth season as Osmani was pregnant and took time off to be with her family.

The eviction show aired on Saturdays except for the seventh season where the eviction show was moved to Fridays.

There are also two live pay-per-view channels available on Albanian pay TV platform DigitAlb to watch during this series.

== Format ==
Big Brother Albania is based on the international Big Brother series produced by Endemol in the Netherlands which began in 1999. The series' name comes from George Orwell's novel Nineteen Eighty-Four (1984), which revolves around a dystopia in which dictator Big Brother is the all-seeing leader. A group of people (called the Housemates) live together in a house, where 24 hours a day their every word and every action is recorded by cameras and microphones in all the rooms in the house. Access to television, the Internet, print media, and time is prohibited. In addition, the housemates live in complete confinement; they have no access to the outside world. At least once a week, the housemates secretly nominate two housemates they wish to face a public vote to evict. The two or more housemates with the most votes face the public vote. The viewing public decides which of them gets evicted through text message votes or phone calls. The nominee with the most votes is evicted and leaves the house.

Should their stay inside the house become difficult for them to bear, a housemate is allowed to voluntarily leave at any time during the game. In the event of a withdrawal from the house, a replacement housemate usually enters in their place.

In the final week of each season, the viewers vote for which of the remaining people in the house should win the prize money and be crowned the winner of Big Brother.

== Series overview ==
Season	Days	Housemates	Winner(s)	Runner(s)-up	Originally aired		Prize money	Presenter
Season	Days	Housemates	Winner(s)	Runner(s)-up	First aired	Last aired	Prize money	Presenter
1	100	18	Arbër Çepani	Olsi Mingomataj	23 February 2008	31 May 2008	€50,000	Arbana Osmani
2	99	20	Qetsor Ferunaj	Adelajda Xhamani	7 February 2009	16 May 2009	€70,000	Arbana Osmani
3	113	22	Jetmir Salaj	Domenika Çaushaj	23 January 2010	15 May 2010	€75,000	Arbana Osmani
4	99	26	Ermela Mezuraj	Ergys Bamçi	25 December 2010	2 April 2011	€75,000	Arbana Osmani
5	99	25	Arbër Zeka	Liam Osmani	18 February 2012	26 May 2012	€100,000	Arbana Osmani
6	99	18	Anaid Kaloti	Iliri Beqiri	23 February 2013	1 June 2013	€100,000	Arbana Osmani
7	99	24	Nevila Omeri	Jona Kalemaj	21 February 2014	30 May 2014	€100,000	Arbana Osmani
8	99	22	Vesel Kurtishaj	Alba Çobaj	7 March 2015	13 June 2015	€100,000	Ledion Liço
9	99	32	Danjel & Fotini	Fiorentina & Olsi	18 March 2017	24 June 2017	€100,000	Arbana Osmani

== Series details ==
Until now in Albania, Top Channel has shown 9 regular seasons.

=== Season 1 ===
The debut season of the Albanian series of the worldwide franchise of Big Brother launched on Saturday, 23 February 2008, with fourteen Housemates entering the House. The show ran for 100 days, and the winner was Arbër Çepani. He received a €50,000 prize. The main host was Arbana Osmani, while Eno Popi received the contestants in and out of the house and conducted interviews with their families.

=== Season 2 ===
The second season of the Albanian series of the worldwide franchise of Big Brother launched on Saturday, 7 February 2009, with fourteen Housemates entering the House. The show was set to run for 99 days until Saturday, 16 May 2009, and the winner, Qetsor Ferunaj received a €70,000 prize. The main host was Arbana Osmani, while Eno Popi hosted a Sunday morning edition called "Big Brother Albania Fans' Club", featuring dialogues with eliminated contestants and fans of the show.

=== Season 3 ===
The third season of the Albanian series of the worldwide franchise of Big Brother launched on Saturday, 23 January 2010, with twelve Housemates entering the House. The winner, Jetmir Salaj received a 10,000,000 Leks (€75,000) prize. The main host is Arbana Osmani, while Eno Popi hosted the Sunday morning edition called "Big Brother Albania Fans' Club", featuring dialogues with eliminated contestants and fans of the show.

=== Season 4 ===
The fourth season of the Albanian series of the worldwide franchise of Big Brother launched on Saturday, 25 December 2010, with fifteen Housemates entering the House. The winner was Ermela Mezuraj and received a 10,000,000 Leks (€75,000) prize. The main host is Arbana Osmani, while Eno Popi hosted the Sunday morning edition called "Big Brother Albania Fans' Club", featuring dialogues with eliminated contestants and fans of the show.

=== Season 5 ===
The fifth season of the Albanian series of the worldwide franchise of Big Brother launched on Saturday, 18 February 2012, with fifteen housemates entering the house. Arbër Zeka won the season and received the 15,000,000 Leks (€100,000) prize. The main host is Arbana Osmani, while the same presenter hosted the Sunday morning spin-off called "Big Brother Albania Fans' Club", featuring dialogues with eliminated contestants and fans of the show.

=== Season 6 ===
The sixth season of the Albanian series of the worldwide franchise of Big Brother started on 23 February 2013, on Top Channel and ended on 1 June 2013. The eviction show aired on Saturdays at 21:00 CET, while a spin-off aired on Sundays called Big Brother Albania Fans' Club. The main host is Arbana Osmani, while Albana Osmani hosted the Sunday morning show, featuring dialogues with eliminated contestants and fans of the show. The winner received 15,000,000 Leks (€100,000). Anaidi was the winner of the season, being so the fifth male winner in the Big Brother Albania history. The house was rebuilt from scratch with a new location in Kashar, Albania. In the house, there are four new rooms added: The Secret's Room, The Surprises' Room, The Matrix Room and The Library.

=== Season 7 ===
The seventh season of the Albanian series of the worldwide franchise of Big Brother started on 21 February 2014, on Top Channel and ended after 99 days on 30 May 2014. The main host was Arbana Osmani, who returned for the seventh season in a row. Ledion Liço was rumoured to be the host of the spin-off show Big Brother Albania Fans' Club thus replacing Albana Osmani, but in last-minute changes, Albana Osmani returned for the third season in a row. The Fans' Club show featured dialogues with eliminated contestants and fans of the show. The winner was Nevila Omeri and received 15,000,000 Leks (€100,000).

=== Season 8 ===
The eighth season of the Albanian television series of the worldwide franchise of Big Brother was on 7 March 2015. The main topic of this season is the host Ledion Liço, while Albana Osmani hosted the Sunday morning show, featuring dialogues with eliminated contestants and fans of the show. The show ran for 99 days and the winner was Vesel Kurtishaj. He received a €100,000 prize.

=== Season 9 ===
The ninth season of the Albanian television series of the worldwide franchise of Big Brother was on 18 March 2017 and the final was on 24 June 2017 in Top Channel. The main host was Arbana Osmani. The show ran for 99 days and the winners were Danjel Dedndreaj & Fotini Derxho. They received a €100,000 prize.

== Spin-off shows ==
From season two, have been different spin-off shows aired on Top Channel.

=== Big Brother Fans' Club (2009–2017) ===
Big Brother Fans' Club launched on 8 February 2009 with Eno Popi been the host for 3 seasons, from season 4 that premiered on 19 February 2012 the host is Albana Osmani. Special guests joined the presenter to analyze the situation of the show.

=== Jashtë Bigut (2014) ===
Jashtë Bigut aired during season seven of Big Brother Albania with Ledion Liço been the host.

=== Big Bastards (2017) ===
Big Bastards launched in March 2017, in the ninth season, with Adrian Pojana and Florian Binaj. The show was every Saturday after the Live Show.

== Big Brother VIP ==
In September 2017, it was rumored that Top Channel had decided to start the celebrity version after the success of the original version. The show was announced in early January 2018 with a teaser along with the renewals of The Voice Kids Albania. Top Channel made a new big studio in Tirana with the name Studio Nova for their prime time shows, Hell's Kitchen Albania, Shiko Kush Luan and other big shows. The house for the Big Brother VIP will also be built there. The celebrity version of the show was first expected to start during the 2017–2018 television season. In 2019, Top Channel announced that Big Brother would come back for the 2019–2020 television season in Albania, but no information was given if it will be an original or a celebrity version. On 17 May 2021, Top Channel announced that soon will begin the auditions for the celebrity housemates of the house.

On 12 August 2021, Top Channel confirmed that the season would begin airing in October 2021. On 17 August 2021, Arbana Osmani announced on her Instagram account that she will be the host of the Big Brother VIP. She also announced that the show will air for 100 days. The first season premiered on 5 October 2021. On 30 December 2021, Top Channel announced that the show would be extended by over a month due to record-breaking ratings. Similar to the format of Grande Fratello, housemates would have to decide on 1 January 2022, whether to renew their contract and stay in the house or to leave the house for good. On 18 February 2022, Ballet dancer Ilir Shaqiri was announced as the first winner of Big Brother VIP.

The second season was announced in February 2022, by the executive producers, Lori Hoxha and Sara Hoxha. After the final of the first season, Osmani announced that the second season will begin airing in December 2022. Few months later, Lori Hoxha confirmed that the second season of Big Brother Vip will begin airing after the end of the 2022 FIFA World Cup. The second season premiered on 24 December 2022.

== See also ==
- Top Channel
