= Eduart Grishaj =

Albanian film and television director (born 1989)

- Born: 7 May 1989 (age 37); Shkodër, PSR Albania
- Education: University of Arts, Tirana
- Occupations: Film director; Television director; Screenwriter
- Years active: 2010s–present
- Spouse: Arbana Osmani (m. 2023)
- Children: 3

Eduart Grishaj (born 7 May 1989) is an Albanian film and television director, best known for directing the feature films Sophia (2022), The Passport (2025) and the reality television series Big Brother VIP Albania and Ferma VIP (season 3).

== Career ==
Grishaj began his career in television production at Top Channel, working in technical and camera roles before moving into directing. He has directed music videos and television advertisements.

His short film Gjyshja (The Grandmother) was screened at several international film festivals.

In 2022, Grishaj wrote and directed his first feature film, Sophia, which was filmed in Albania and Italy. The film's promotion included a showcase in Times Square, New York.

In late 2022, Grishaj was appointed director of the 61st edition of Festivali i Këngës on RTSH, collaborating with his wife Arbana Osmani as the presenter.

In 2025, he directed the feature film Pasaporta (The Passport), which deals with themes of identity and Albanian emigration.

In television, Grishaj directed the first three seasons of Big Brother VIP Albania. In 2026, he was involved in the production of the reality series Ferma VIP (season 3) as director.

== Filmography ==
=== Film ===
- Gjyshja (The Grandmother) (2020) – director (short film)
- Sophia (2022) – director, screenwriter
- The Passport (2025) – director, screenwriter

=== Television ===
- Big Brother VIP Albania (2021–2023) – director
- Festivali i Këngës 61 (2022) – director
- Ferma VIP (2026-) – director

== Personal life ==
Grishaj is married to television presenter Arbana Osmani. The couple married in Tuscany, Italy, in June 2023. They have two children together.
