= SIGAL (insurance company) =

SIGAL Insurance Group
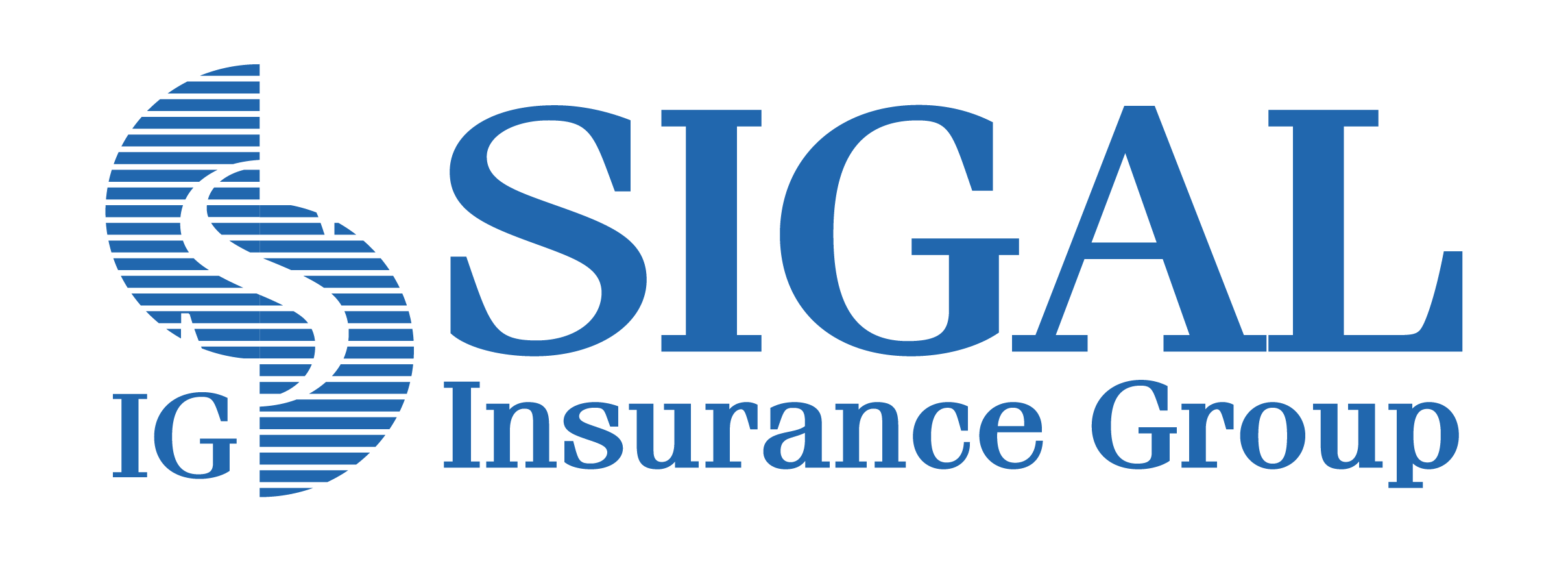
- Company type: Insurance company
- Industry: Financial services
- Founded: 22 February 1999
- Headquarters: Tirana, Albania
- Area served: Albania, Kosovo, North Macedonia
- Key people: Avni Ponari (CEO)
- Products: Life and non-life insurance
- Website: sigal.com.al

SIGAL Insurance Group (or SIGAL IG) (Formerly SIGAL UNIQA Group AUSTRIA) is a group of seven insurance companies and one private pension fund that operates in Albania, Kosovo and North Macedonia.

== Company ==
The following companies are part of the SIGAL Insurance Group:

- SIGAL Insurance Group (Non-Life Insurance, Albania)
- SIGAL Life (Life Insurance, Albania)
- SIGAL Kosovo (Non-Life Insurance, Kosovo)
- SIGAL Life Kosovo (Life Insurance, Kosovo)
- SIGAL Skopje (Non-Life Insurance, North Macedonia)
- SIGAL Life Skopje (Life Insurance, North Macedonia)
- SIGAL Reinsurance Albania
- SIGAL Pension Fund

== History ==
Founded in 1999, SIGAL is a prominent company in the Albanian insurance market, holding a significant share in various sectors.

SIGAL was among the first insurance companies in Albania to receive foreign investment in 2003. The Albanian-American Fund of Enterprise (AAEF) became SIGAL's first shareholder with the acquisition of 13.3% of the shares. This agreement provided support to SIGAL as well as to the wider insurance market in Albania and in the region where SIGAL operates.

In 2007, SIGAL became part of the UNIQA Group, a European financial group operating in 17 countries. Uniqa Insurance Group was the biggest stakeholder of SIGAL.

On June 23rd, 2025 Uniqa Insurance Group announced that they will cease operations in Albania, Kosovo and North Macedonia and all the shares are claimed back by its legitimate owner Avni Ponari

== Financial Data ==
According to the Albanian Financial Supervisory Authority’s report for 2025 (January–December 2025), SIGAL paid 25.38% of total non-life insurance claims, ranking first in a market where 8 insurance companies operate. It also paid 41.84% of total life insurance claims in a market with 5 operating insurance companies.

== Management ==
Since its establishment in 1999, the Chief Executive Officer of SIGAL Insurance Group has been Mr. Avni Ponari.
