= Arbana Osmani =

Albanian author and former television presenter (born 1983)

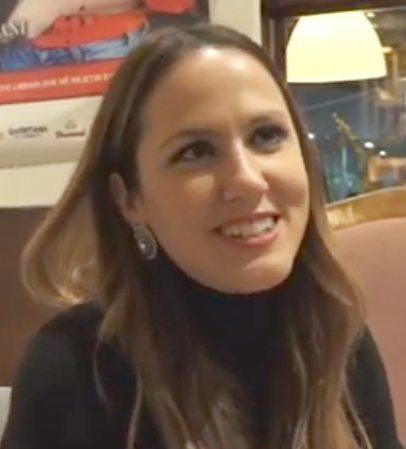
- At a signing for Receta për 5 minuta in 2019
- Born: 7 May 1983 (age 43); Maqellarë, PSR Albania
- Occupations: TV presenter; author; Restaurant owner
- Years active: 2000–present
- Known for: Presenter of Big Brother Albania (2008–2023)
- Spouse: Eduart Grishaj (m. 2023) Ardit Kero (m. 2002; div. 2018)
- Children: 3

Arbana Osmani Grishaj (born 7 May 1983) is an Albanian television presenter, author and entrepreneur. She hosted Big Brother Albania and its celebrity version Big Brother VIP from February 2008 to May 2023. In March 2026, she returned to television as the host of the third season of the reality show Ferma VIP on Vizion Plus. The show is directed by film and television director Eduart Grishaj, her husband.

== Career ==
She started her career in 2000 as a journalist for the Intervista magazine. Later she started working for Top Albania Radio, first as a radio presenter for shows like Top Select in 2002.

Later she went on to work in television at Top Channel, she presented for four seasons the popular show Top Fest, together with other TV presenters such as Ledion Liço, Xhemi Shehu, Alban Dudushi and Evis Mula. She has also presented other shows like Pasdite në Top Channel, E Diell, 1001 pse?!, an entertainment children's show and other shows.

For 7 editions in a row, from 2008 until 2014, Osmani presented Albania's most watched reality show, Big Brother Albania. In 2013, she confirmed that Big Brother would go on hiatus for a year. She was then working on her cooking book. However, Big Brother returned with a seventh season on 22 February 2014, with Osmani returning as well as the host of the show. She did not return for the eighth season, due to pregnancy. The main host was Ledion Liço. Osmani returned to the show as a presenter for its ninth season.

In 2015–2016 season, she presented for one season the game show Në 1 javë. From 29 October 2016, and for 5 seasons she presented the show Dua të të bëj të lumtur on Top Channel.

On 17 August 2021, Osmani announced on her Instagram account that she would be presenting the celebrity version of Big Brother VIP Albania, that began airing on 5 October 2021 on Top Channel. Due to satisfactory ratings of the first season, Top Channel announced a second season of Big Brother VIP, which began airing in December 2022, with Osmani being the presenter of the show.

In 2022, Osmani made an appearance as herself in the film Sophia.

Osmani hosted the 61st edition of the annual Albanian music competition Festivali i Këngës on RTSH.

In November 2023, Osmani founded 'Bana's, an Albanian fast casual restaurant chain. The first location opened in the Pyramid of Tirana and specialises in pasta, sandwiches and desserts. The brand later expanded to Shkodër and Pristina, with further plans for expansion to other cities.

At the end of 2024, Osmani started her new virtual show through her official YouTube channel, called "Mirëmbrëma Yje" where she invites various public figures who are no longer invited in the media.

== TV shows ==
- Top Select (Top Albania Radio)
- Top Fest (Top Channel)
- Pasdite në Top Channel (Top Channel)
- E Diell (Top Channel)
- 1001 pse?! (Top Channel)
- Big Brother Albania (Top Channel) – seasons 1, 2, 3, 4, 5, 6, 7 and 9
- Në 1 javë (Top Channel)
- Dua të të bëj të lumtur (Top Channel)
- Big Brother VIP (Top Channel) – seasons 1 and 2
- Festivali i Këngës (RTSH) – edition 61
- Mirëmbrëma Yje (independent YouTube podcast)
- Mirëmbrëma Yje Kids (independent YouTube podcast)
- Ferma VIP (Vizion Plus) - season 3

== Film ==
- The Passport (Self) - TV host

== Books ==
- Receta për njerëzit që dua (2013)
- Receta për 5 minuta (2019)

== Personal life ==
Osmani was in a relationship with Ardit Kero for 16 years. They have a son, Joni.

Osmani met musical director Eduart Grishaj in 2019. They have a son, Diell (born 2020) and a daughter, Zoi (born 2022).
