= Top Fest =

Music competition in Albania

- Genre: Music competition Music television
- Created by: Top Channel
- Presented by: Evis Mula; Arbana Osmani; Alban Dudushi; Ledion Liço; Xhemi Shehu; Marina Vjollca; Luana Vjollca; Dojna Mema
- Country of origin: Albania
- Original language: Albanian
- No. of seasons: 12

Production
- Production location: Palace of Congresses
- Camera setup: Multi-camera
- Running time: Varies
- Production company: Top Channel

Original release
- Network: Top Channel
- Release: 2004 – 2015

Top Fest was an Albanian music competition organised by Top Channel. It began airing in 2004 with its last edition being in 2015. The event was annually held in Tirana, Albania at Palace of Congresses. The songs were usually performed in Albanian with artists from Albania, Kosovo, North Macedonia and other Albanian-speaking territories. From its 7th edition (2010), the participants performed their entries 100% live.

== Format ==
Since 2010, the show has been split into three phases. The first phase airs all accepted entries, performing their entries in playback. The second phase is the Semi-Finals, usually split in three shows, where the winners from phase one perform. The qualifiers from the semi-finals perform in the final, usually 10 to 13 acts. The winner is chosen in the Finale-night, usually held in late-May or early-June.

=== Presenters and directors ===
The contest has been always held in the Congress Palace of Tirana and the personnel, has varied through the years. Since the first edition of the contes to 2009, the festival was directed by the Rock performer Bojken Lako, also known for his participation in other festivals. From 2010 to the final contest in 2015, the festival was directed by Ergys Lubonja.

The festival has been presented by many prominent personalities. The first presenters were Evis Mula, Arbana Osmani and Alban Dudushi. Since 2006, Ledion Liço presented or co-presented the contest until the last edition.

Year	Presenters	Venue	Director
2004	Evis Mula, Arbana Osmani & Alban Dudushi	Congress Palace of Tirana	Bojken Lako
2005	Arbana Osmani, Alban Dudushi	Congress Palace of Tirana	Bojken Lako
2006	Arbana Osmani, Alban Dudushi, Ledion Liço & Xhemi Shehu	Congress Palace of Tirana	Bojken Lako
2007	Alban Dudushi, Arbana Osmani & Ledion Liço	Congress Palace of Tirana	Bojken Lako
2008	Ledion Liço & Arbana Osmani	Congress Palace of Tirana	Bojken Lako
2009	Ledion Liço & Arbana Osmani	Congress Palace of Tirana	Bojken Lako
2010	Ledion Liço & Arbana Osmani	Congress Palace of Tirana	Ergys Lubonja
2011	Ledion Liço, Marina Vjollca & Luana Vjollca	Congress Palace of Tirana	Ergys Lubonja
2012	Ledion Liço, Marina Vjollca & Luana Vjollca	Congress Palace of Tirana	Ergys Lubonja
2013	Ledion Liço, Marina Vjollca & Luana Vjollca	Congress Palace of Tirana	Ergys Lubonja
2014	Ledion Liço, Marina Vjollca & Luana Vjollca	Congress Palace of Tirana	Ergys Lubonja
2015	Dojna Mema & Ledion Liço	Congress Palace of Tirana	Ergys Lubonja

=== Winners ===
The contest has produced many artists, like Alban Skënderaj, Elhaida Dani, and many others, who were established and rose fame after their participation in Top Fest.

Year	Origin	Artist	Song	Translation	Composers
2004	Albania	Stine	"Lady Lady"	– Stine	
2005	Albania	Alban Skënderaj	"Vetëm ty"	Only you	Alban Skënderaj
2006	Albania & Kosovo	Alban Skënderaj & Kthjellu	"Diçka"	Something	Alban Skënderaj
2007	Albania	Greta Koçi	"Sa më lodhe"	You annoyed me	Genti Lako & Arben Dusha
2008	Albania	Besa Kokëdhima	"Engjëjt vrasin njëlloj"	Angels kill the same	Olti Curri
2009	Kosovo	Linda Halimi	"Ëndërroj"	I dream	Flori Mumajesi
2010	Albania	Eneda Tarifa	"Me veten"	With myself	Flori Mumajesi
2011	Albania	Elvana Gjata	"Me ty"	With you	Flori Mumajesi
2012	Albania	Elhaida Dani	"S'je më"	You're not anymore	Kledi Bahiti
2013	Albania	Samanta Karavella	"Loti i fundit"	The last teardrop	Kledi Bahiti
2014	Albania	Soni Malaj	"Me të jeton"	It lives with him..	Rozana Radi & Gent Myftaraj
2015	Kosovo	Ermal Fejzullahu, Lumi B & Ledri Vula	"Shko"	Go	Big Bang, Lumi B & Ledri Vula

== Trivia ==
- The only performer who won Top Fest more than once, was Alban Skënderaj, with two victories in a row in 2005 accompanied by the Kosovan Kthejllu, and in 2006 as a solo artist.
- Flori Mumajesi is the most successful composer in the history of the contest, with three of his compositions winning the event in 2009, 2010 and 2011.
- Kledi Bahiti, is the second most successful composer, with two winning songs in a row, 2012 and 2013.
- From the technical point of view, Top fest in 2008 was the very first Albanian song festival to use LED screens in the stage of the Tirana Congress Palace.

== Cancellation ==
Although the contest was, at first very popular and generated many positive opinions from music experts, because the opportunity for new Albanian talented artists, the organisers of the event, for unspecified reasons, declared that the 12th edition of the festival would be the very last one. The reasons behind the discontinuation of the event remain unknown, however, the falling audiences of the last editions might have determined the end of the festival.
