= Getoar Mjeku =

Kosovar Albanian lawyer, writer and politician

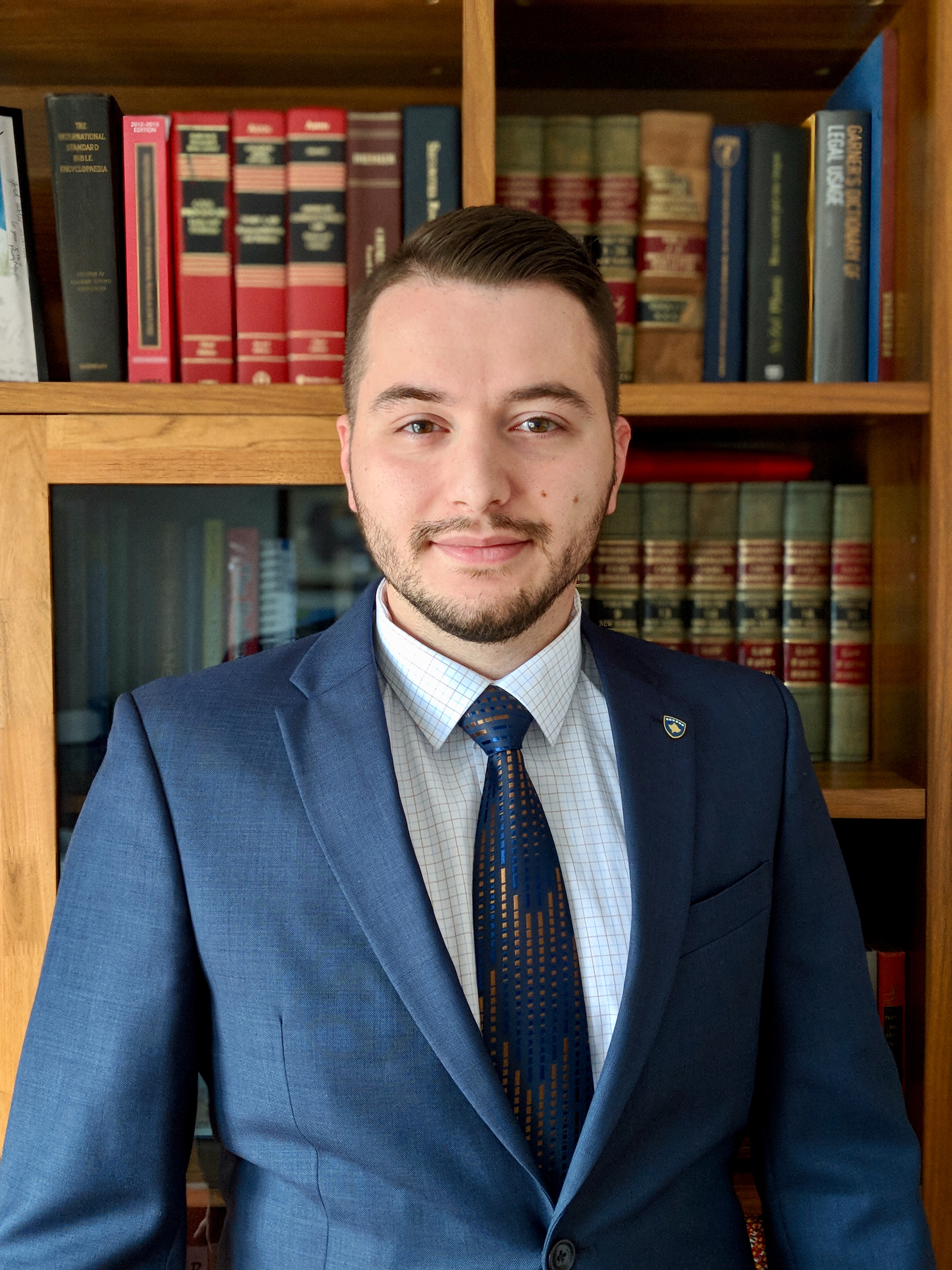
- Office portrait, 2017

Deputy Minister of Economy
- Incumbent
- Assumed office 1 September 2022
- President: Vjosa Osmani
- Prime Minister: Albin Kurti
- Minister: Artane Rizvanolli
- Preceded by: Mentor Arifaj

Deputy Minister of Industry, Entrepreneurship and Trade
- In office 29 March 2021 – 1 September 2022
- President: Glauk Konjufca (acting); Vjosa Osmani
- Prime Minister: Albin Kurti
- Minister: Rozeta Hajdari
- Succeeded by: Mentor Arifaj

Personal details
- Born: 28 September 1987 (age 38) Pristina, Kosovo, Yugoslavia
- Party: Vetëvendosje
- Education: Texas Lutheran University (BA); Dedman School of Law (JD)
- Getoar Mjeku's voice Country statement at informal meeting of Energy Community Ministerial Council, Bosnia and Herzegovina; Recorded 3 July 2024

Getoar Mjeku (Albanian pronunciation: [gɛtɔˈar ˈmjeːku]; born September 28, 1987) is a Kosovar Albanian lawyer, writer and politician, and current deputy minister of economy of the Republic of Kosovo. He previously served as deputy minister of industry, entrepreneurship and trade.

Mjeku received his higher education at Texas Lutheran University and Southern Methodist University in the United States. He has an active law license in Texas, and is a member of the International Law Section. He has practiced in the areas of commercial and administrative law in the United States and Kosovo, and has written about international law and the Albanian language.

As a lawyer and member of the Vetëvendosje Movement, Mjeku has been active in strategic litigation against abuses in publicly owned enterprises, environmental protection, and the energy sector. A deputy minister, he has handled legislative initiatives, trade and investment matters, and state-owned enterprises. He was a principal author of the Law on the Sovereign Fund of the Republic of Kosova, a wealth management and investments entity.

Mjeku is a proponent of plain language and a critic of Albanian language regulation. He maintains a blog about language, culture and law.

== Early life and education ==
Getoar Mjeku was born in Pristina, Kosovo, to a middle-class family with ties to Gjilan and the Llap region. His given name, Getoar, is a portmanteau or initialism with the names of major Albanian dialects and sub-ethnic groups. He explains his family name as a word derived from the Latin medicus, meaning medical doctor. His father, Mehmet, was a reporter at Radio Prishtina who started his own business after Albanian-language radio and television were shut down by Serbian occupation. His mother, Fatime, is a dentist whose private office was used by the dental school of the University of Pristina for several years, as Albanian-language education was suppressed under the Serbian regime.

Getoar and his family spent four months in France as refugees during the 1998–1999 Kosovo War.

Mjeku attended Ismail Qemali elementary and middle school and completed grades 9 through 11 at Mehmet Akif College in Pristina. At 16, he was hired as a sportscaster by RTV21, where he covered major sports events and prepared and directed a weekly television program on basketball for a year.

In September 2005, Mjeku moved to Texas for education, sponsored by a Kosovo Albanian family. He attended Memorial Hall School in Houston, Texas, graduating valedictorian in May 2006. Mjeku then received a full scholarship from Texas Lutheran University, a liberal arts institution in Seguin, Texas, where he enrolled in the honors program. Mjeku majored in political science with a pre-concentration and minored in Spanish, and graduated magna cum laude with a bachelor of arts degree in May 2010. During his undergraduate studies, he spent a semester at American University in Washington, DC, and a summer's program at Universidad Nacional in Heredia, Costa Rica.

As a freshman in college, Mjeku began writing for Albanian-language publications and translated a book into English. Mjeku worked as a broadcaster for the Voice of America Albanian service for a year, 2010–2011, following his college graduation.

In August 2011, Mjeku enrolled in the Juris Doctor program at SMU Dedman School of Law in Dallas, Texas. He was a summer clerk with a Houston-based firm, attended the SMU Oxford law programme, and joined the SMU civil clinic as a student attorney and chief counsel. He graduated cum laude in May 2014 and passed the Texas bar that summer.

== Early career ==
Following his graduation from law school, Mjeku worked as an attorney with a Thomson Reuters legal team and a Houston-based law firm on major commercial and immigration cases. He returned to Kosovo at the end of 2015, where he became involved with civil society organizations and advised clients on international, commercial, and administrative matters.

In 2017, he led a team of lawyers providing support to commercial law judges in Kosovo courts through a USAID project. He simultaneously served as an external legal expert for the Kosovo Privatization Agency, handling complex spin-off cases. His opinions were instrumental to recalling major state assets from indolent buyers that failed to comply with their commitments to invest and employ local workers.

In 2018, Mjeku worked with the Kosovo Telecom, a publicly owned enterprise, where he advised the management on bad contracts. While already concerned with corruption in the public sector, he became increasingly convinced that political action was needed to support his role as a lawyer.

Through 2019, Mjeku was employed as a legal adviser with a GIZ project advising municipalities on waste management and corporate governance.

== Political career ==
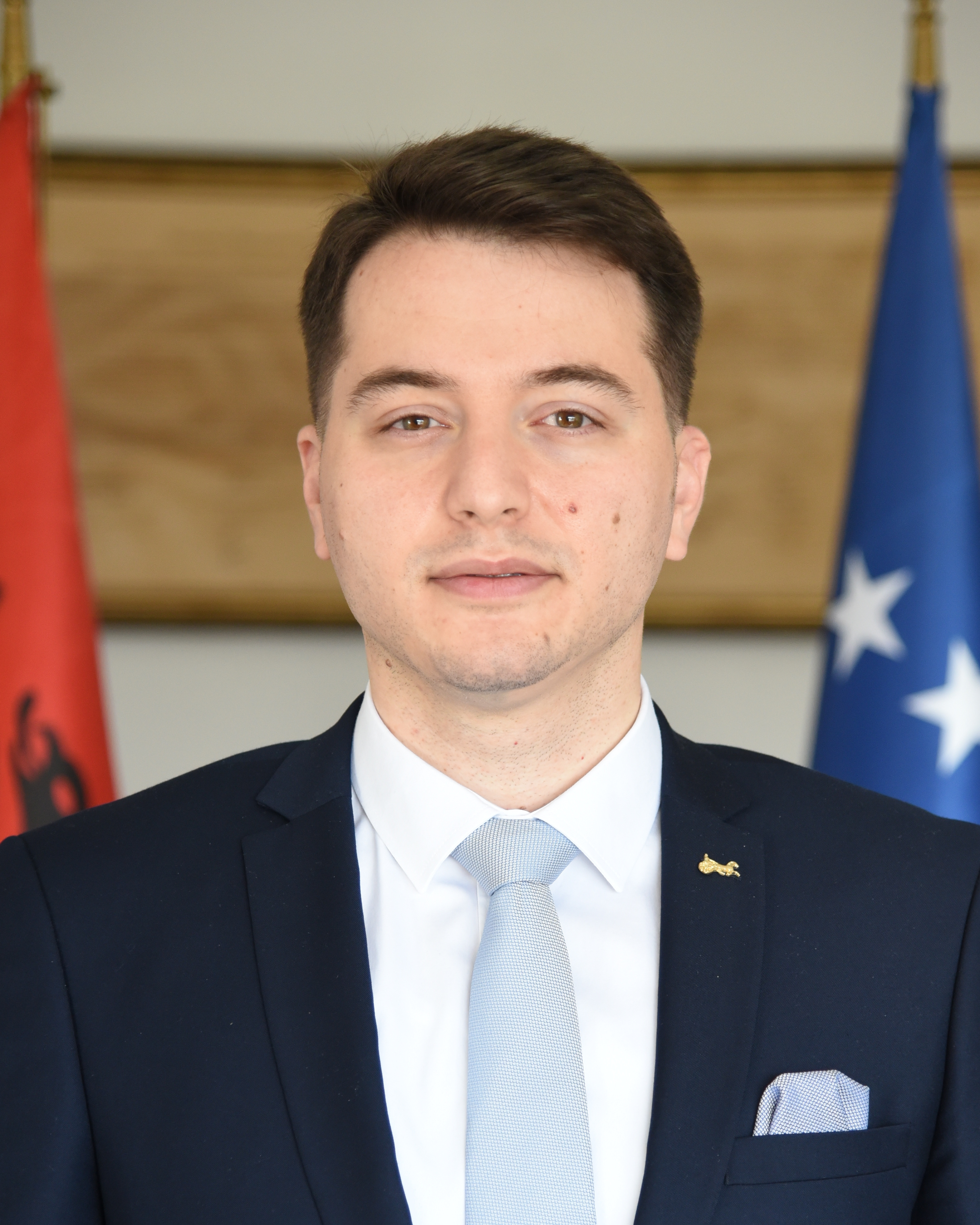
Official portrait of Mjeku as deputy minister of industry, entrepreneurship and trade, 2021

Since his return to Kosovo in 2015, Mjeku had regularly criticized the government on rule of law and foreign policy. In 2018, he sponsored a petition against plans by President Hashim Thaçi to partition Kosovo as part of a peace deal with Serbia.

On 25 August 2019, Mjeku officially joined the Vetëvendosje Movement, just days after the Assembly dissolved itself. He stood as a candidate in the parliamentary elections held that year, with a focus on the rule of law and economic development. He gathered 4527 votes — more than most candidates, but insufficient to gain a seat in the 7th legislature.

After the first Kurti government was sworn in in February 2020, Mjeku served as legal adviser to the minister of economy, employment, trade, industry, entrepreneurship and strategic investments, Rozeta Hajdari. In this position, he prepared key government documents, including decisions to remove the directors of 10 out of 17 enterprises owned by the central government, to address mismanagement of public property, and to impose reciprocity measures in trade relations with Serbia. He also advised the minister on matters of energy, private sector development, and COVID-19 management.

When Kurti was ousted in June 2020, Mjeku became a legislative aid for the Vetëvendosje caucus.

As a Vetëvendosje activist, Mjeku became involved in several cases of strategic litigation. In December 2019, he represented the plaintiff in a lawsuit against the energy regulator, claiming that a feed-in tariff support scheme for renewable energy was against applicable EU law and unlawfully benefited a single oligarch. While the case is ongoing, Mjeku successfully obtained a restraining order, which put an effective end to the scheme.

In July 2020, Mjeku represented the workers union of the Kosovo Telecom in an attempt to undo an unfavorable revenue-share contract with a virtual mobile operator. In December 2020, Mjeku then served as the attorney for Vetëvendosje activists seeking a restraining order on three hydropower plants due to concerns of environmental degradation. The court ordered the plants to halt operations, while pertinent permits and licenses are reviewed.

On 29 March 2021, Mjeku was appointed deputy minister of industry, entrepreneurship and trade in the second Kurti government, returning to work with Minister Hajdari. He has primarily assisted with legislative reform, with 11 laws proposed during the first year in office. Key legislative proposals include a new law on investments, fuel market, foreign trade, competition, inspections, intellectual property and price control.

On 1 September 2022, he was transferred as deputy minister to the Ministry of Economy, which is in charge of energy, mines, ICT, and publicly owned enterprises. Mjeku primarily supervised state-owned enterprises, which include the nation's largest energy and mining operators, the postal office, the leading telecom provider, railways, and water utility and irrigation companies. He co-lead the working group that drafted the Law on the Sovereign Fund of the Republic of Kosova, a strategic wealth management and investments entity, hailed as a transformation reform for Kosovo's economy.

== Views on language ==
Mjeku is known as a proponent of Albanian language reform, criticizing the language policy imposed by the communist regime in Albania and maintained for political expedience during the transition to democracy. He calls for writers to freely use the Gheg lexicon, the 'me+' infinitive, and a reduced participle, which reflect the spoken language of the majority of Albanians. His public speech is marked by his use of the Gheg dialect, while his non-fiction writing varies between the Elbasan-based standard and a modified Tosk standard.

Mjeku has also encouraged about plain language writing. He has adopted techniques taught by his professor Bryan Garner to Kosovar legislation and court documents, even drafting a proposed constitution for Kosovo to showcase his style. He has also translated selected writings of George Orwell, including his essay on "Politics and the English language".
