= Rozeta Hajdari =

Kosovar politician; Minister of Industry, Entrepreneurship and Trade

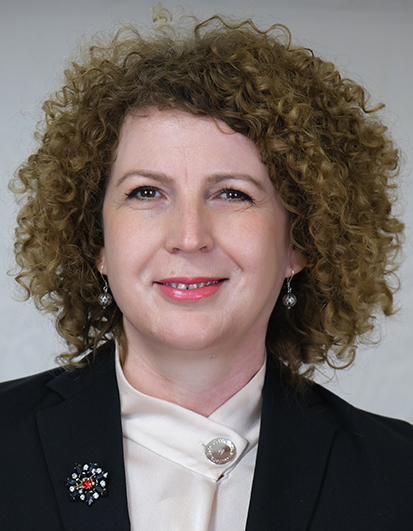
- Official portrait as member of parliament

Minister of Industry, Entrepreneurship and Trade of Kosovo
- Incumbent
- Assumed office 22 March 2021 (Note: Caretaker since 23 March 2025)
- President: Glauk Konjufca (acting); Vjosa Osmani
- Prime Minister: Albin Kurti
- Deputy: Getoar Mjeku; Mentor Arifaj
- Preceded by: Vesel Krasniqi

Minister of Economy, Employment, Trade, Industry, Entrepreneurship, and Strategic Investments
- In office 4 February 2020 – 3 June 2020
- President: Hashim Thaçi
- Prime Minister: Albin Kurti
- Preceded by: Endrit Shala; Valdrin Lluka; Skender Reçica
- Succeeded by: Vesel Krasniqi; Blerim Kuçi; Skender Reçica

Personal details
- Born: 10 June 1974 (age 51) Rakoc, Peja, Kosovo, Yugoslavia (now Kosovo)
- Party: none; nominated by Vetëvendosje
- Education: University of Prishtina; Linnaeus University

Rozeta Hajdari (born June 10, 1974) is a Kosovar economist and politician, currently serving as minister of industry, entrepreneurship and trade of the Republic of Kosovo. Following a lengthy career with foreign development organizations, she joined the government as a non-partisan minister in 2020.

== Education ==
Hajdari studied economics at the University of Prishtina and completed her master's degree at Linnaeus University in Växjö, Sweden.

== Career ==
Hajdari worked for over two decades with international development agencies, government and business organizations in areas of economy, education, governance, public administration reform, and European integration. She was in charge of institution-building, policy planning and coordination, implementation, monitoring and evaluation. During her career, she maintained a clear vision of aid effectiveness and local ownership.

Hajdari has also taught economics and management courses at the Haxhi Zeka University in Peja and at RIT Kosovo.

In February 2020, Hajdari was appointed minister of economy, employment, trade, industry, entrepreneurship and strategic investments in the first Kurti government. As she assumed the portfolios of five former ministries, she became known as a "super minister". During her short tenure, she dismissed the directors of ten publicly owned enterprises, proposed trade reciprocity measures against Serbia, worked on a plan to collect electricity payments in northern Kosovo, and assisted with COVID-19 measures.

While she remained a non-party member, Hajdari stood as a candidate for the Vetëvendosje Movement in the 2021 parliamentary elections. She gave up her seat after the opening session to become minister of industry, entrepreneurship and trade in the second Kurti government in March 2021.

In her first year in office, Hajdari proposed 11 laws, supervised Kosovo's participation in Expo Dubai 2020, and undertook important reforms within her department. Her focus is industrial policy reform and investment promotion.
