= Getoar =

Getoar is an Albanian given name for males. It is composed of the first two letters of Albanian subethnic divisions.

- GE stands for Gheg living in the north of Albanian lands (Northern Albania) and speaking the Gheg Dialect.
- TO for Tosk living in the south and speaking the Tosk Dialect
- AR for Arbëresh, Albanians living in Italy, Greece etc. and speaking varieties of Albanian like Arbëresh and Arvanitika.

Notable people bearing this name include:

- Getoar Selimi (born 1982), member of the rap group "Tingulli 3nt" and head of "Baba Records"
- Getoar Mjeku (born 1987), Kosovar Albanian lawyer, writer and politician
