= Summer Fest (Albanian TV series) =

Albanian music television special and live performance series

- Genre: Music / Variety
- Created by: Ledja Liku
- Screenplay by: Olti Curri
- Directed by: Ergys Lubonja
- Presented by: Ledion Liço; Marina Vjollca; Luana Vjollca; Ardit Roshi
- Country of origin: Albania
- Original language: Albanian

Production
- Producer: Ledja Liku
- Production company: Top Channel

Original release
- Network: Top Channel
- Release: 5 August 2012

Summer Fest is an Albanian television program produced by Top Channel. It features live music performances by singers, bands, and other entertainers, and has been held in various cities in Albania and Kosovo.

== Format ==
The program is structured as a live concert series broadcast on television. Episodes typically include a mix of musical performances, comedy sketches, and dance acts. The events are staged in outdoor public spaces during the summer months.

== History ==
The first edition took place in Pristina, Kosovo, with hosts Ledion Liço and Luana Vjollca. Performers included Troja, Adelina Ismajli, and Gent Bushpepa.

In 2013, the program was held in Vlora, featuring artists such as Bojken Lako, Jon Tarifa, Eneda Tarifa, and Genta Ismajli. Later editions were also staged in other cities including Saranda, Struga, and Durrës.
