= Getoar Selimi =

Kosovo-Albanian rapper (born 1982)

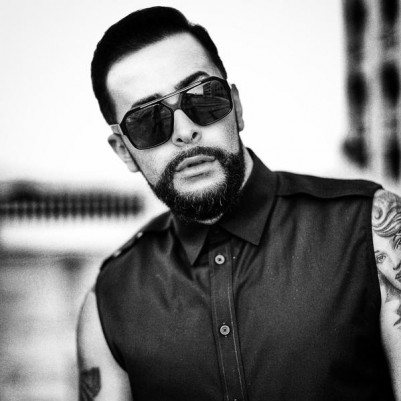
- Selimi in 2013
- Born: 3 July 1982 (age 44); Pristina, SFR Yugoslavia
- Other names: Geasy; Ghetto Geasy
- Occupations: Rapper; singer; songwriter
- Years active: 1994–present
- Spouse: Marina Vjollca (m. 2017)
- Children: 1
- Musical career
- Instruments: Vocals
- Label: Babastars

Getoar Selimi (Albanian: [gɛˈtoaɾ sɛˈlimi]; born 3 July 1982), also known as Geasy or Ghetto Geasy, is a Kosovo-Albanian rapper, singer and songwriter. Born and raised in Pristina, Selimi found prominence in the Albanian-speaking Balkans as a member of the musical group Tingulli 3nt beginning in 1996.

== Life and career ==
=== 1989–2011: Formations and Tingulli 3nt ===
Getoar Selimi was born on 3 July 1982 in an Albanian family in the city of Pristina, Kosovo. Selimi together with Kosovo-Albanian musicians Besa Gashi and Jeton Trashupa formed the musical group Tingulli 3nt and began their career as a group in 1996. They rose to national prominence in the Albanian-speaking Balkans with the release of six successful studio albums, which altogether significantly contributed to the rise of their stardom. Selimi continues to be member of Tingulli 3nt and commenced to release occasional solo projects since 2012.

=== 2012–present: Solo projects and continued success ===
By 2012, Selimi went on to release his first single "N'Prishtinë" in November, which he dedicated to his hometown Pristina. His follow-up single, "E nxonme", was released approximately a year after in September 2013.

== Personal life ==
As of 2015, Selimi resides with his wife Marina Vjollca, an Albanian television presenter, in a residence they bought in Tirana, Albania. After their engagement, he married Vjollca on 10 September 2017. On 24 November 2021, Vjollca gave birth to their first daughter, Marget Selimi.

== Discography ==
=== Singles ===
==== As lead artist ====
Title	Year	Peak chart positions	Album
Title	Year	ALB	Album
"N'Prishtinë"	2012	—N/a	Non-album singles
"E nxonme"	2013	—N/a	Non-album singles
"BS" (featuring Onat)	2016	—	Non-album singles
"Ajo" (featuring Majk)	2016	3	Non-album singles
"Berlusconi"	2016	—	Non-album singles
"Birthday Girl"	2017	9	Non-album singles
"Bisha me 2 koka" (featuring Skivi)	2017	46	Non-album singles
"Dashni me raki" (featuring Flori Mumajesi)	2018	2	Non-album singles
"Ghetto Geasy"	2018	—	Non-album singles
"Amante"	2019	57	Non-album singles
"Vamos" (with Onat)	2019	13	Non-album singles
"Moti" (featuring Onat and Shaolin Gang)	2019	—	Non-album singles
"Zhytem (Je t'aime)" (featuring Majk)	2020	15	Non-album singles
"Hajde te Baba" (with Majk)	2020	—	Non-album singles
"Para Para" (with Majk featuring Ermal Fejzullahu)	2021	24	Non-album singles
"Andiamo" (featuring Stine)	2021	45	Non-album singles
"Mëkati jem" (with Majk featuring Xhensila Myrtezaj)	2021	10	Non-album singles
"DING DING" (with Luiz Ejlli)	2024	1	
"—" denotes a recording that did not chart or was not released in that territory.

==== As lead artist ====
Title	Year	Peak chart positions	Album
Title	Year	ALB	Album
"Baby (Një herë në jetë)" (Flori Mumajesi featuring Getoar Selimi)	2007	—N/a	Non-album singles
"MMV" (Tuna featuring Getoar Selimi)	2014	—N/a	Non-album singles
"Ta du majmunin" (NRG Band featuring Getoar Selimi)	2015	—	Non-album singles
"Tirana Lifestyle" (Luana Vjollca featuring Getoar Selimi)	2015	—	Non-album singles
"S'jena mo" (Majk featuring Getoar Selimi)	2015	—	Non-album singles
"Paris Milano" (Majk featuring Getoar Selimi)	2018	—	Non-album singles
"Mori" (Flori Mumajesi featuring Bruno and Getoar Selimi)	2018	1	Non-album singles
"Malena" (Majk featuring Getoar Selimi)	2019	—	Non-album singles
"O sa mirë" (Lumi B featuring Ghetto Geasy and EGLI)	2025	1	
"—" denotes a recording that did not chart or was not released in that territory.

Albums

Title	Year	Peak chart positions	Album
Title	Year	ALB	Album
"5 KURORA"	2025		5 KURORA
"NIVELI BABA" (featuring Ledri Vula, SkiviSkillz, Onat, Cozman)	2025		5 KURORA
"AL HARAMI"	2025	8	5 KURORA
"ROLEX/ROLLS ROYCE" (featuring Lumi B, Mc Kresha)	2025		5 KURORA
"VAFFANCULO" (featuring Melinda Ademi)	2025		5 KURORA
"MY G" (featuring Ledri Vula, ErgeNR)	2025		5 KURORA
"PER VETEN" (featuring Ya Nina)	2025		5 KURORA
"LORO PIANA" (featuring Mozzik)	2025		5 KURORA
"SI TI" (featuring Tuna)	2025		5 KURORA
"EDHE 1 NATE" (featuring Majk)	2025		5 KURORA
"XHELOZIA" (featuring Arilena Ara)	2025	53	5 KURORA
"LA FAMIGLIA" (featuring Lyrical Son, Lluni, Onat)	2025		5 KURORA
"UNE"	2025		5 KURORA
"BABA"	2025	11	5 KURORA

== See also ==
- Getoar, an Albanian given name
