= Ferma VIP season 3 =

Ferma VIP
- Season 3
- Hosted by: Arbana Osmani
- No. of days: 81
- No. of contestants: 30
- Winner: Mimoza Ahmeti
- Runner-up: Ilir Shaqiri
- Companion show: Ferma Club
- No. of episodes: 24

Release
- Original network: Vizion Plus
- Original release: 27 March – 15 June 2026

Season chronology
- ← Previous; Season 2

Ferma VIP 3, was the third season of Ferma VIP. The season started airing on 27 March 2026 on Vizion Plus, and ended after 81 days on 15 June 2026, with Arbana Osmani as the new host, replacing Luana Vjollca. Armina Mevlani returned as an opinionist after a one-season hiatus, while Einxhel Shkira and Ermal Mamaqi joined the show as opinionists for the first time, replacing Kastro Zizo and Inida Gjata Zhaku.

The season is directed by Eduart Grishaj and produced by Vita Production, with Holta Dulaku, who returns as producer of the format and Eraldo Rexho as executive producer.

Throughout the season, viewers could watch live footage from the house through two live channels, Ferma VIP 1 and Ferma VIP 2, which were available on the Albanian pay-per-view television platform Tring and streamed for free on YouTube.

The spin-off show Ferma Club began airing on 11 April 2026 on Vizion Plus. It is hosted by Florian Agalliu, with Albano Bogdo and Çiljeta Xhilaga as opinionists, all of whom previously participated as contestants in the first season of Ferma VIP. The show features discussions, debates, and behind-the-scenes content related to the third season of Ferma VIP.

== Contestants ==
On Day 1, nineteen celebrity contestants entered the farm during the launch show. During the season, eleven celebrity contestants entered the farm, bringing the total number of contestants to thirty.

Contestant	Age	Notability	Entered	Exited	Status	Finish
Xhesi Loci	25	Bodybuilder	Day 1	Day 8	Eliminated 1st on April 3, 2026	30th
Akil Varfi	28	Comedian	Day 1	Day 11	Eliminated 2nd on April 6, 2026	29th
Fairfax		DJ	Day 1	Day 15	Eliminated 3rd on April 10, 2026	28th
Teni Vllacaj	30	TV Presenter	Day 1	Day 15	Eliminated 3rd on April 10, 2026	28th
Khuba	36	Singer	Day 1	Day 18	Walked on April 13, 2026	26th
Anada Nikollari	36	Model	Day 8	Day 18	Eliminated 5th on April 13, 2026	25th
Jonida Maliqi	43	Singer	Day 1	Day 19	Walked on April 14, 2026	24th
Klodian Dedja	50	Curator	Day 15	Day 25	Eliminated 6th on April 20, 2026	23rd
Ermiona Lekbello	48	Singer	Day 15	Day 29	Walked on April 24, 2026	22nd
Ervin Kapaj		Physiotherapist	Day 18	Day 32	Eliminated 7th on April 27, 2026	21st
Malbora Gurra	43	TV Presenter	Day 1	Day 38	Ejected on May 3, 2026	20th
Dona Sina	23	Model	Day 1	Day 39	Eliminated 8th on May 4, 2026	19th
Adion Puka		Rapper	Day 1	Day 39	Eliminated 9th on May 4, 2026	18th
Fabjola Elezaj	23	Model	Day 1	Day 43	Eliminated 10th on May 8, 2026	17th
Gresa Sekiraqa	29	Rapper	Day 1	Day 43	Walked on May 8, 2026	16th
Vanesa Sono	24	Singer	Day 1	Day 50	Eliminated 11th on May 15, 2026	15th
Henri Rrufa	28	Athlete	Day 36	Day 57	Eliminated 12th on May 22, 2026	14th
Blerina Bajko	39	Journalist	Day 1	Day 60	Eliminated 13th on May 25, 2026	13th
Indri Shiroka	36	Actor	Day 1	Day 64	Eliminated 14th on May 29, 2026	12th
Sorgin Osmanaj	25	Influencer	Day 50	Day 67	Ejected on June 1, 2026	11th
Inida "Zhaku" Gjata	44	TV Presenter & Director	Day 43	Day 71	Eliminated 15th on June 5, 2026	10th
Kostana Morava	40	Journalist	Day 43	Day 71	Eliminated 16th on June 5, 2026	9th
Klevisa Gega	19	Model	Day 50	Day 74	Eliminated 17th on June 8, 2026	8th
Romir Zalla	53	Actor	Day 1	Day 77	Eliminated 18th on June 11, 2026	7th
Sara Karaj	30	Influencer	Day 1	Day 77	Eliminated 19th on June 11, 2026	6th
Bujaka	33	DJ	Day 18	Day 81	Fifth place on June 15, 2026	5th
Soni Malaj	44	Singer	Day 1	Day 81	Fourth place on June 15, 2026	4th
Elvis Pupa	49	Actor & comedian	Day 1	Day 81	Third place on June 15, 2026	3rd
Ilir Shaqiri	52	Dancer	Day 8	Day 81	Runner-up on June 15, 2025	2nd
Mimoza Ahmeti	62	Poet & writer	Day 1	Day 81	Winner on June 15, 2025	1st

== Challenge ==
=== Nominations Influence ===
Each week, contestants compete in a Challenge, which may unleash good or bad consequences on the nomination process.

In another system, the contestants were divided into teams to compete in a challenge. The teams played against each other, and the losing team was required to face the public vote.

Week	Day	Air date	Farmer of the week	Farmer participation			Winner
1	4	March 30, 2026	Mimoza	Dona, Khuba		Fairfax, Xhesi	Dona, Khuba
1	8	April 3, 2026	Mimoza	Adion, Elvis, Jonida, Khuba, Malbora, Mimoza, Sara, Teni, Vanesa		Akil, Blerina, Dona, Fabjola, Fairfax, Gresa, Indri, Romir, Soni	Adion, Elvis, Jonida, Khuba, Malbora, Mimoza, Sara, Teni, Vanesa
2	11	April 6, 2026	Romir	Akil, Fairfax, Gresa			Gresa
2	15	April 10, 2026	Romir	Anada, Blerina	Dona, Khuba	Fairfax, Teni	Dona, Khuba
3	18	April 13, 2026	Ilir	Anada, Dona, Fabjola, Gresa, Ilir, Malbora, Romir, Sara			Dona, Gresa, Ilir, Romir, Sara
3	22	April 17, 2026	Ilir	Blerina, Klodian, Malbora		Dona, Elvis, Gresa	Dona, Elvis, Gresa
4	29	April 24, 2026	Adion	Bujaka, Ervin, Mimoza			Mimoza
5	36	May 1, 2026	Sara	Blerina, Bujaka, Dona, Elvis, Ilir			Ilir
5	36	May 1, 2026	Sara	Malbora, Romir, Soni, Vanesa			Malbora
7	46	May 11, 2026	Indri	Blerina, Bujaka, Henri, Sara, Vanesa			Bujaka
8	53	May 18, 2026	Soni	Blerina, Bujaka, Henri			Bujaka
8	57	May 22, 2026	Soni	Blerina, Elvis, Ilir, Indri, Kostana, Zhaku		Bujaka, Klevisa, Mimoza, Romir, Sara, Sorgin	none
9	64	May 29, 2026	Bujaka	Klevisa, Kostana, Indri			Kostana
10	71	June 5, 2026	Klevisa	All farmers			none
11	74	June 8, 2026	Sara	Bujaka, Elvis, Ilir, Klevisa, Romir, Sara, Soni			Ilir
11	77	June 11, 2026	Sara	Elvis, Ilir, Romir, Sara, Soni			Soni
11	77	June 11, 2026	Sara	Elvis, Ilir, Sara			Elvis
12	81	June 15, 2026	none	Elvis, Ilir, Mimoza, Soni			Ilir

=== Budget Challenge ===
Each week, contestants compete in the Budget Challenge, and then they are informed of the percentage of the budget they have earned for food.

Week	Day	Air date	Farmer participation	Budget won
2	11	April 6, 2026	All farmers	37%
3	18	April 13, 2026	All farmers	65%
4	25	April 20, 2026	Fabjola, Gresa	100%
5	32	April 27, 2026	All farmers	100%
6	39	May 4, 2026	All farmers	13%
7	46	May 11, 2026	All farmers	90%
8	53	May 18, 2026	All farmers	28%
9	60	May 25, 2026	Bujaka, Indri, Kostana, Mimoza, Sorgin, Zhaku	60%
9	60	May 25, 2026	Elvis, Ilir, Klevisa, Romir, Sara, Soni	100%
10	67	June 1, 2026	Elvis, Soni	90%

== Nominations table ==
Color key:

Winner
Runner-up
Other finalists
Farmer of the week
Nominated for eviction
Immune from eviction
Not eligible
Evicted
Walked
Ejected
Saved by the public votes
Challenge winner
Saved by another farmer

	Week 1		Week 2		Week 3	Week 4	Week 5	Week 6				Week 7	Week 8	Week 9		Week 10		Week 11				Week 12 Final	
	Day 4	Day 8	Day 11	Day 15	Week 3	Week 4	Week 5	Day 39		Day 40	Day 43	Week 7	Week 8	Day 60	Day 64	Day 71		Day 74		Day 77		Week 12 Final	
Farmer of the week	Mimoza		Romir		Ilir	Adion	Sara	Elvis				Indri	Soni	Bujaka		Klevisa		Sara				none	
Viewers’ favorite	Mimoza	none												Elvis		none							
Viewers’ least favorite	Dona, Fairfax, Khuba, Xhesi	none	Anada, Blerina, Dona, Fairfax, Khuba, Teni	none								Blerina, Bujaka, Henri	none	Klevisa, Kostana, Indri	none								
Mimoza	Farmer of the week	Farmer of the week	Exempt	Saved by the public	Saved by the public	Adion	Saved by the public	Nominated	Bujaka to save	Not eligible	Romir, Sara	Henri, Zhaku	Sorgin	Saved by the public	Not eligible	Nominated	Bujaka	Exempt	Exempt	Exempt	Exempt	Winner (Day 81)	
Ilir	Not in the Farm		Exempt	Challenge winner	Farmer of the week	Ervin, Mimoza	Challenge winner	Not eligible	Blerina to save	Not eligible	Bujaka, Mimoza	Kostana, Zhaku	Elvis	Saved by the public	Nominated	Nominated	Mimoza	Challenge winner	Nominated	Nominated	Nominated	Runner-up (Day 81)	
Elvis	Exempt	Exempt	Exempt	Exempt	Challenge winner	Dona, Ervin	Nominated	Not eligible	Sara to save	Not eligible	Blerina, Bujaka	Ilir, Sara	Blerina	Saved by the public	Romir to save	Nominated	Romir	Nominated	Nominated	Nominated	Challenge winner	Third place (Day 81)	
Soni	Exempt	Blerina to save	Exempt	Exempt	Saved by the public	Ermiona	Nominated	Not eligible	Blerina to save	Not eligible	Bujaka, Mimoza	Henri, Zhaku	Farmer of the week	Saved by the public	Not eligible	Nominated	Romir	Nominated	No voting	Challenge winner	Exempt	Fourth place (Day 81)	
Bujaka	Not in the Farm				Exempt	Malbora	Nominated	Not eligible	Mimoza to save	Not eligible	Blerina, Sara	Blerina, Zhaku	Bujaka	Farmer of the week	Farmer of the week	Nominated	Mimoza	Nominated	Nominated	Exempt	Exempt	Fifth place (Day 81)	
Sara	Exempt	Exempt	Exempt	Challenge winner	Saved by Ilir	Malbora, Mimoza	Farmer of the week	Not eligible	Vanesa to save	Not eligible	Bujaka, Mimoza	Kostana, Zhaku	Romir	Saved by the public	Nominated	Nominated	Romir	Nominated	No voting	Nominated	Nominated	Evicted (Day 77)	
Romir	Exempt	Fabjola to save	Farmer of the week	Challenge winner	Saved by the public	Ervin, Malbora	Nominated	Not eligible	Soni to save	Not eligible	Bujaka, Mimoza	Kostana, Zhaku	Sara	Saved by the public	Saved by Elvis	Nominated	Ilir	Nominated	No voting	Nominated	Evicted (Day 77)		
Klevisa	Not in the Farm												Sara	Nominated	Not eligible	Nominated	Soni	Nominated	Evicted (Day 74)				
Kostana	Not in the farm											Ilir, Sara	Elvis	Challenge winner	Not eligible	Nominated	Evicted (Day 71)						
Zhaku	Not in the farm											Blerina, Sara	Ilir	Saved by the public	Nominated	Evicted (Day 71)							
Sorgin	Not in the Farm												Romir	Saved by the public	Not eligible	Ejected (Day 67)							
Indri	Exempt	Saved by the public	Exempt	Exempt	Saved by the public	Malbora, Mimoza	Saved by the public	Not eligible	Vanesa to save	Not eligible	Bujaka, Mimoza	Kostana, Zhaku	Blerina	Nominated	Evicted (Day 64)								
Blerina	Exempt	Saved by Soni	Nominated	Exempt	Nominated	Gresa	Nominated	Not eligible	Sara to save	Not eligible	Bujaka, Mimoza	Bujaka, Kostana	Ilir	Evicted (Day 60)									
Henri	Not in the farm						Exempt	Not eligible	Romir to save	Not eligible	Indri, Sara	Blerina, Sara	Evicted (Day 57)										
Vanesa	Exempt	Exempt	Exempt	Exempt	Saved by the public	Ermiona	Nominated	Not eligible	Indri to save	Not eligible	Bujaka, Blerina	Evicted (Day 50)											
Gresa	Exempt	Challenge winner	Exempt	Challenge winner	Challenge winner	Blerina	Saved by the public	Not eligible	Fabjola to save	Not eligible	Walked (Day 43)												
Fabjola	Exempt	Dona to save	Exempt	Nominated	Saved by Ilir	Ervin, Mimoza	Saved by the public	Not eligible	Gresa to save	Nominated	Evicted (Day 43)												
Adion	Exempt	Exempt	Exempt	Exempt	Saved by Ilir	Bujaka	Saved by the public	Nominated	Evicted (Day 39)														
Dona	Challenge winner	Soni to save	Challenge winner	Challenge winner	Challenge winner	Gresa	Nominated	Evicted (Day 39)															
Malbora	Exempt	Exempt	Exempt	Nominated	Nominated	Ermiona	Challenge winner	Ejected (Day 38)															
Ervin	Not in the Farm				Exempt	Bujaka	Evicted (Day 32)																
Ermiona	Not in the Farm			Exempt	Saved by the public	Vanesa	Walked (Day 29)																
Klodian	Not in the Farm			Exempt	Nominated	Evicted (Day 25)																	
Jonida	Exempt	Exempt	Exempt	Exempt	Walked (Day 19)																		
Anada	Not in the Farm		Nominated	Nominated	Evicted (Day 18)																		
Khuba	Challenge winner	Exempt	Challenge winner	Walked (Day 18)																			
Fairfax	Nominated	Nominated	Nominated	Evicted (Day 15)																			
Teni	Exempt	Exempt	Nominated	Evicted (Day 15)																			
Akil	Exempt	Nominated	Evicted (Day 11)																				
Xhesi	Nominated	Evicted (Day 8)																					
Notes	1	2	3	4	5	6	7	8	9, 10	10	11, 12, 13	14	15	16	17, 18	19	20	21	22	23	24	25	
Up for nomination	Dona, Fairfax, Khuba, Xhesi	Akil, Fairfax, Gresa, Indri	Anada, Blerina, Dona, Fairfax, Khuba, Teni	Anada, Dona, Fabjola, Gresa, Ilir, Malbora, Mimoza, Romir, Sara	Blerina, Dona, Elvis, Ermiona, Gresa, Indri, Klodian, Malbora, Mimoza, Romir, Soni, Vanesa	Bujaka, ~~Ermiona~~, Ervin, Gresa, Mimoza	Adion, Blerina, Bujaka, Dona, Elvis, Fabjola, Gresa, Ilir, Indri, Malbora, Mimoza, Romir, Soni, Vanesa	none	Bujaka, Fabjola, Gresa, Ilir, Indri, Mimoza, Romir, Soni	none	Blerina, Bujaka, Henri, Mimoza, Sara, Vanesa	Blerina, Bujaka, Elvis, Henri, Ilir, Mimoza, Romir, Sara, Soni	Blerina, Bujaka, Elvis, Ilir, Indri, Kostana, Klevisa, Mimoza, Romir, Sara, Sorgin, Zhaku	Elvis, Ilir, Indri, Kostana, Klevisa, Mimoza, Romir, Sara, Soni, Sorgin, Zhaku	none	All farmers	none	Bujaka, Elvis, Ilir, Klevisa, Romir, Sara, Soni	none	Elvis, Ilir, Romir, Sara, Soni	Elvis, Ilir, Sara	none	
Challenge winner	Dona, Khuba	Gresa	Dona, Khuba	Dona, Gresa, Ilir, Romir, Sara	Dona, Elvis, Gresa	Mimoza	Ilir, Malbora	none			Bujaka	Bujaka	none	Kostana	none			Ilir	none	Soni	Elvis	none	
Saved by the public	none	Indri	none	Mimoza	Ermiona, Indri, Mimoza, Romir, Soni, Vanesa	Gresa	Adion, Fabjola, Gresa, Indri, Mimoza	none			Mimoza	Elvis, Ilir, Mimoza, Romir, Sara, Soni	none	Elvis, Ilir, Mimoza, Romir, Sara, Soni, Sorgin, Zhaku	none								
Nominated for eviction	Fairfax, Xhesi	Akil, Fairfax	Anada, Blerina, Fairfax, Teni	Anada, Fabjola, Malbora	Blerina, Klodian, Malbora	Bujaka, Ervin	Blerina, Bujaka, Dona, Elvis, Romir, Soni, Vanesa	Adion, Mimoza	none	Fabjola	Blerina, Henri, Sara, Vanesa	Blerina, Henri	Blerina, Bujaka, Elvis, Ilir, Indri, Kostana, Klevisa, Mimoza, Romir, Sara, Sorgin, Zhaku	Indri, Klevisa	Ilir, Sara, Zhaku	All farmers	Mimoza, Romir	Bujaka, Elvis, Klevisa, Romir, Sara, Soni	Bujaka, Elvis, Ilir	Elvis, Ilir, Romir, Sara	Ilir, Sara	Bujaka, Elvis, Ilir; Mimoza, Soni	
Ejected	none						Malbora	none								Sorgin	none						
Walked	none			Khuba	Jonida	Ermiona	none				Gresa	none											
Evicted	Xhesi; Most votes to evict	Akil; Most votes to evict	Fairfax; Most votes to evict	Anada; Fewest votes to save	Klodian; Fewest votes to save	Ervin; Fewest votes to save	Dona; Fewest votes to save	Adion; Fewest votes to save	Eviction cancelled	Fabjola; Most votes to evict	Vanesa; Fewest votes to save	Henri; Fewest votes to save	Blerina; Fewest votes to save	Indri; Fewest votes to save	Zhaku; Fewest votes to save	Kostana; Fewest votes to save	Mimoza; Most votes to be finalist	Klevisa; Fewest votes to save	Bujaka; Most votes to be finalist	Romir; Fewest votes to save	Ilir; Most votes to be finalist	Bujaka; Fewest votes (out of 5)	Soni; Fewest votes (out of 4)
Evicted	Xhesi; Most votes to evict	Akil; Most votes to evict	Teni; Most votes to evict	Anada; Fewest votes to save	Klodian; Fewest votes to save	Ervin; Fewest votes to save	Dona; Fewest votes to save	Adion; Fewest votes to save	Eviction cancelled	Fabjola; Most votes to evict	Vanesa; Fewest votes to save	Henri; Fewest votes to save	Blerina; Fewest votes to save	Indri; Fewest votes to save	Zhaku; Fewest votes to save	Kostana; Fewest votes to save	Mimoza; Most votes to be finalist	Klevisa; Fewest votes to save	Bujaka; Most votes to be finalist	Romir; Fewest votes to save	Ilir; Most votes to be finalist	Elvis; Fewest votes (out of 3)	Ilir; Fewest votes (out of 2)
Evicted	Xhesi; Most votes to evict	Akil; Most votes to evict	Teni; Most votes to evict	Anada; Fewest votes to save	Klodian; Fewest votes to save	Ervin; Fewest votes to save	Dona; Fewest votes to save	Adion; Fewest votes to save	Eviction cancelled	Fabjola; Most votes to evict	Vanesa; Fewest votes to save	Henri; Fewest votes to save	Blerina; Fewest votes to save	Indri; Fewest votes to save	Zhaku; Fewest votes to save	Kostana; Fewest votes to save	Mimoza; Most votes to be finalist	Klevisa; Fewest votes to save	Bujaka; Most votes to be finalist	Romir; Fewest votes to save	Sara; Fewest votes to be finalist	Mimoza; Most votes to win	

=== Notes ===
- ^Note 1: The viewers voted for their favourite farmer. Mimoza received the most votes and was named Farmer of the Week. Dona, Khuba, Fairfax and Xhesi received the fewest votes and were therefore required to participate in a paired challenge, with the pairings determined by Mimoza. All other farmers were granted immunity as a result of the public vote. Dona and Khuba formed one team, while Fairfax and Xhesi formed the other. In the challenge, Fairfax and Xhesi lost and therefore faced the public vote.
- ^Note 2: The farmers were divided into two groups for a challenge. The first group consisted of Adion, Elvis, Jonida, Khuba, Malbora, Mimoza, Sara, Teni and Vanesa, while the second group included Akil, Blerina, Dona, Fabjola, Fairfax, Gresa, Indri, Romir and Soni. The first group won the challenge and gained immunity, while the second group faced a saving chain in which each farmer had to save another contestant. Romir, as the group leader, made the first choice. Akil, Fairfax, Gresa and Indri were the last remaining contestants not to be saved and therefore faced the public vote. In the first televote, the public voted for which of the four contestants should remain in the game. Indri received the most votes and was declared safe. The remaining three contestants—Akil, Fairfax, and Gresa—competed in an additional challenge. The winner gained immunity, while the two losing contestants were nominated for eviction.
- ^Note 3: The viewers voted for their favourite farmer. Anada, Blerina, Dona, Fairfax, Khuba and Teni received the fewest votes and were therefore required to participate in a paired challenge. All other farmers were granted immunity as a result of the public vote. The contestants formed three teams: Anada and Blerina, Dona and Khuba, and Fairfax and Teni. After the challenge, Anada, Blerina, Fairfax, and Teni were declared the losing contestants and were subsequently nominated for eviction, while Dona and Khuba were granted safety.
- ^Note 4: On Day 15, Romir, as Farmer of the Week, nominated Fabjola, Gresa, Malbora, Mimoza and Sara for the public vote. Mimoza received the most votes and was granted immunity, while the remaining nominees stayed at risk of eviction. A subsequent challenge included the remaining nominees alongside Anada, Dona, Ilir and Romir, who were selected by the public. From the eight participants, Dona, Gresa, Ilir, Romir and Sara won the challenge and were granted immunity, while Anada, Fabjola and Malbora lost the challenge and were nominated for eviction.
- ^Note 5: Ilir, serving as Farmer of the Week, was granted the power to assign immunity to three contestants and chose Adion, Fabjola, and Sara. All remaining contestants entered a public televote in which viewers voted for those they wished to save. The six contestants with the lowest number of votes were Blerina, Dona, Elvis, Gresa, Klodian, and Malbora, who subsequently competed in a challenge. Following the challenge, Dona, Elvis and Gresa secured immunity by winning, while Blerina, Klodian, and Malbora were defeated and therefore nominated for eviction.
- ^Note 6: The following contestants were recognized by Agai, the farm overseer, as the most hardworking farmers on the farm: Elvis, Fabjola, Ilir, Indri, Romir, and Sara. The remaining contestants then voted to determine which participants would be sent to the challenge, with Bujaka, Ermiona, and Gresa receiving the highest number of votes. The public then voted to determine which of the three nominated farmers would not participate in the challenge. As a result, Gresa was exempted from the challenge and granted immunity. The six most hardworking farmers were subsequently tasked with selecting two additional contestants to join Bujaka in the challenge. Ervin and Mimoza received the most votes and took part in the challenge, which was won by Mimoza, granting her immunity. Ervin and Bujaka were defeated and consequently nominated for eviction.
- ^Note 7: All contestants were nominated, except for Sara, who was Farmer of the Week. The public vote determined which contestants would be saved, with Adion, Fabjola, Gresa, Indri and Mimoza, receiving the highest number of votes securing immunity. The remaining contestants, who received the fewest votes, were required to participate in a challenge. Ilir and Malbora won the challenge and received immunity. Then, the farmers who did not have immunity were nominated for eviction.
- ^Note 8: Adion and Mimoza were automatically nominated due to breaking the rules.
- ^Note 9: The farmers voted for the person they wanted to save, and the farmers with the most votes received immunity. Blerina, Sara, and Vanesa received the most votes and won immunity, while Elvis, as Farmer of the Week, and Henri, who was the new farmer, also had immunity. All other farmers were put up for the televote, and one farmer would be saved by the viewers. The remaining farmers then had to compete in a challenge.
- ^Note 10: On Day 40, after Fabjola broke the rules, Agai announced that the televote from Day 39 would be cancelled and that Fabjola was automatically nominated for eviction. The public vote was then opened to decide whether she would remain in the competition or be eliminated.
- ^Note 11: On day 43, after Henri broke the rules, Agai announced that he would automatically face every eviction of the season until he is evicted, meaning he also could not be nominated by his fellow farmers in following weeks.
- ^Note 12: Blerina, Bujaka, Mimoza, and Sara received the most votes from the farmers and were nominated for the public televote, while Henri was also nominated for breaking the rules. Viewers then voted to save one contestant.
- ^Note 13: After Mimoza was saved by the public, Blerina, Bujaka and Zhaku had the power to send one contestant to the challenge. All three chose Vanesa. Then Blerina, Bujaka, Henri, Sara and Vanesa competed in the challenge, which was won by Bujaka. Afterwards, Blerina, Henri, Sara and Vanesa faced the televote.
- ^Note 14: The farmers had to nominate two farmers that they would send to nomination, but Agai decided that the two farmers with the most votes would have immunity. Kostana and Zhaku got the most votes so they were granted immunity, while Indri, as Farmer of the Week, also had immunity. The rest of the farmers instead went to televoting.
- ^Note 15: The farmers voted for one farmer in each group to receive immunity. The first group consisted of Bujaka, Klevisa, Mimoza, Romir, Sara, and Sorgin, while the second group consisted of Blerina, Elvis, Ilir, Indri, Kostana, Soni, and Zhaku. Both groups tied with two nominations each, so all farmers had to compete in a challenge, except for Soni, who was already safe as Farmer of the Week. However, after Sorgin was caught cheating, Agai stopped the challenge and announced that both groups would face the televoting.
- ^Note 16: Bujaka was selected as the Farmer of the Week and therefore received immunity from eviction. The viewers voted for their favorite contestants among the remaining farmers. Elvis received the highest number of votes, while Indri, Kostana, and Klevisa received the fewest votes and had to compete in a challenge. Kostana won the challenge and secured her place in the competition. As a result, Indri and Klevisa were nominated for eviction.
- ^Note 17: Ilir, Romir, Sara, and Zhaku were automatically nominated for eviction after breaking the rules. However, as the viewers’ favorite contestant, Elvis was given the power to save one of the nominees. He chose to save Romir, leaving Ilir, Sara, and Zhaku nominated for eviction.
- ^Note 18: After Sorgin got ejected, Agai announced that the televoting from day 64 would be extended until day 71.
- ^Note 19: The farmers competed in a challenge for immunity. However, the challenge ended without a winner, meaning no one received immunity. As a result, every farmer was nominated for eviction.
- ^Note 20: The farmers voted to determine the first finalist of the season. Mimoza and Romir received the highest number of votes and advanced to a public vote. The public then chose between the two contestants, with the farmer receiving the most votes becoming the first finalist.
- ^Note 21: The farmers competed in a challenge for immunity. Ilir won the challenge and received immunity, while all the other farmers were nominated for eviction. Mimoza was also immune, as she had already secured a place in the final by becoming the first finalist.
- ^Note 22: The sheep decided whom to send to the televote for being the second finalist. They chose Bujaka, Elvis and Ilir.
- ^Note 23: Bujaka and Mimoza were already finalists. The remaining farmers competed in a challenge to determine the third finalist. Soni won the challenge and secured a place in the final. The losing farmers faced the televoting.
- ^Note 24: The farmers competed in a challenge to determine the fourth finalist. Bujaka, Mimoza and Soni had already secured their places in the final. Elvis won the challenge and became the fourth finalist. The remaining farmers went to televoting to decide who would be the fifth finalist.
- ^Note 25: At the final round, the public voted for the winner.
