= Memorial Hall School (Houston) =

- Houston, Texas; United States

Information
- Founded: 1966
- Founder: Donna W. Aurich
- Closed: 2022
- CEEB code: 443404
- NCES School ID: 01328131
- Faculty: 80 (lower/upper-combined 1975)
- Enrollment: ≥485 (lower/upper-combined 1975)
- Mascot: Cougars
- Website: Website (Archived)
- Last updated: May 11, 2024

Memorial Hall School was a nonsectarian and later an international private school in Houston, Texas, operating from 1966 until 2022. MHS was designed as an alternative to public school for students who preferred academic individualization, and intentionally utilized small classroom spaces for students to reach their full potential. Originally a K-12 school, Memorial Hall later redacted lower grades and was only available for students in grades 6–12 in 2020.

== History ==
The school began operations in 1966 under the direction of Donna W. Aurich who was previously the principal at Chelsea Place School and began a special education program at St. Luke's Methodist Church (located next to Lamar High School). Her husband, Rev. George Aurich, started the high school portion of Memorial Hall and served as the headmaster, and the first senior class graduated in 1975 when the high school population totaled 185 students. At this time the lower school population surpassed 300.

Donna Aurich was also the founder of The Community School, a second-chance private high school that was designed to rehabilitate and help teenagers reenter mainstream school. Rev. George Aurich served as the principal of Community. There were 21 students for the 1969–70 school year. Community High School eventually became the high school portion of Memorial Hall by the early-1970s. The Houston Oilers held a fundraiser where portions of ticket sales for their 1973 preseason matchup against the New York Jets raised funds for Memorial Hall. In addition to Community and Memorial Hall, Donna Aurich also helped run a preschool at St. Peter's Lutheran Church in Downtown Houston.

In 1987 MHS opened the Reserve Ranch (RR Reserve Ranch), an equestrian ranch outside Conroe, Texas, as a rural boarding program. Memorial Hall received international (I-20) status in 1988.

Memorial Hall School was the site of a protest in 1997 regarding a topless bar located at West T.C. Jester Blvd., a mere 734 feet from the school, then located at Dacoma Road. A city ordinance required such businesses be at least 1,500 feet from an educational establishment, church, or park, under an incoming addendum to the sexually oriented business (SOB) ordinance. According to headmaster Rev. George Aurich, who met the thirty protesters on campus, some MHS students were waiting for rides and carpools at the strip center containing the bar.

After several campus relocations, Memorial Hall School closed following the 2021–22 school year. The formal announcement cited declining enrollment numbers and other difficulties caused by the COVID-19 pandemic.

== Campuses ==
Memorial Hall School resided on six separate campuses in its fifty-six years of operation. The original location was started by Donna W. Aurich in an office building. Located in Spring Branch, the first separate physical campus was at 9002 Ruland Road alongside The Community School. Community moved to 1836 Ojeman Road in early 1970. The second campus at 3911 Campbell Road, purchased in 1972, first housed only the high school portion while the lower school continued to operate at the Ruland campus. The lower and upper schools would later consolidate at Campbell. Greater Houston Adventist Academy later occupied the Campbell Road campus from 1986 to 2000. As of 1993, the similarly-named Academy Hall High School was also at the Campbell Road campus.

MHS relocated near Lazybrook/Timbergrove and resided at 3721 Dacoma Street from 1986 to 2010. The 1.75-acre, 26,000 square-foot facility received over $1 million in donations from the Quaker Oats Company to cover the majority of the $1.35 million cost. In 2010, the Dacoma Road campus facilities were purchased by Gateway Academy, a private middle and high school for students with diagnosed autism and learning disabilities. Later campuses were at 5400 Mitchelldale Street and 2501 Central Parkway, the latter they occupied from 2015 until closing in 2022.

== Reserve Ranch ==
In 1987, Memorial Hall School opened the forty-acre Reserve (RR) Ranch. Located right outside Conroe, Texas, the ranch provided after-school and weekend boarding options for students whose parents lived a great distance from Houston. The facility also offered outdoor activities and study programs. The entire land, located on League Line Road, was sold in 2005 and was later the site of an immigrant shelter.

== Athletics ==
The Memorial Hall athletic teams were known as the Cougars. MHS had football, girls basketball, boys basketball and baseball teams. The football team was subjected to infamy when, on September 29, 1978, they gave up 599 rushing yards to a single player, a then-Texas high school football record, in an 85–22 loss to Marian Christian School.

== Alumni ==
- Getoar Mjeku (2006) - Deputy Minister of Economy of Kosovo

== Former staff members ==
- George Rice (Football Coach, Principal, Athletic Director)
- Joe Robb (Athletic Director)
