= Marina Vjollca =

Albanian television presenter and entrepreneur (born 1990)

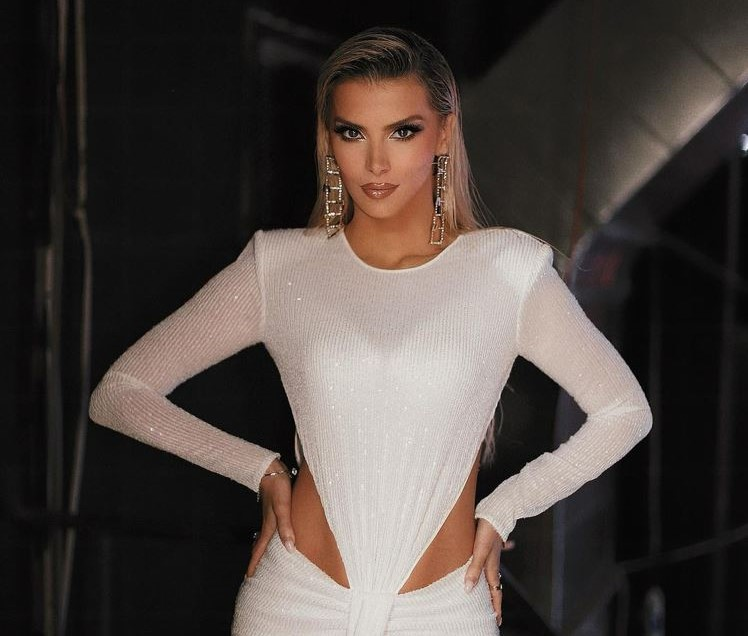
- Vjollca in 2026
- Born: Marina Vjollca; 17 May 1990 (age 36); Tirana, Albania
- Occupations: Television presenter; Entrepreneur
- Years active: 2005–present
- Spouse: Getoar Selimi (m. 2017)
- Children: 1
- Relatives: Luana Vjollca (sister)

Marina Vjollca (born 17 May 1990) is an Albanian television presenter and entrepreneur. She has hosted different programs on Top Channel, including Top Select, E Diell, Proçesi Sportiv, and Top Fest, and later on TV Klan with C’est la vie and Klanifornia.

== Early life and education ==
Vjollca was born and raised in Tirana, where she continues to reside. She worked as a showgirl on the satirical program Fiks Fare on Top Channel before beginning her career as a television presenter. She completed university studies in Law and holds a master's degree in Criminal Law.

== Television career ==
In 2005, Vjollca participated in a contest for showgirls on Fiks Fare and became part of the program for two years.

In 2007, she hosted the youth program Top Select, and in 2008 she joined as a presenter on Proçesi Sportiv.

While at Top Channel, Vjollca also presented E Diell, Top Fest (four editions), and Summer Fest with her sister Luana. She remained a main presenter until 2017.

In September 2017, she joined TV Klan to host the music show C’est la vie. From 2019 to 2023, she presented Klanifornia.

== Business career ==
On 12 July 2021, in Tirana, Vjollca became owner and brand ambassador of the Italian fashion brand Elisabetta Franchi for Albania.

== Personal life ==
Vjollca has been married to rapper Getoar Selimi since 2017. The couple has one daughter.
