= George Rice (American football) =

American football player and coach (1944–2010)

No. 72
- Position: Defensive tackle

Personal information
- Born: June 20, 1944; Liberty, Missouri, U.S.
- Died: December 26, 2010 (aged 66); Sealy, Texas, U.S.
- Listed height: 6 ft 3 in (1.91 m)
- Listed weight: 260 lb (118 kg)

Career information
- High school: Istrouma (Baton Rouge, Louisiana)
- College: LSU (1962–1965)
- NFL draft: 1966: 1st round, 12th overall pick
- AFL draft: 1966: 3rd round, 21st overall pick

Career history

Playing
- Houston Oilers (1966–1969)

Coaching
- Memorial Hall Cougars (1971–1974); Houston Oilers (1975–1976)

Awards and highlights
- Second-team All-American (1965); First-team All-SEC (1964); Second-team All-SEC (1965)

Career AFL statistics
- Fumble recoveries: 3
- Sacks: 10
- Stats at Pro Football Reference

George Gaylen Rice (June 10, 1944 – December 26, 2010) was an American professional football defensive tackle who played four seasons in the American Football League (AFL) with the Houston Oilers. He was selected by the Oilers in the third round of the 1966 AFL draft. Rice was also selected by the Chicago Bears in the first round of the 1966 NFL draft. He played college football for the LSU Tigers.

== Early life ==
George Gaylen Rice was born on June 10, 1944, in Liberty, Missouri. He participated in football, basketball, and track and field at Istrouma High School in Baton Rouge, Louisiana. He was a first-team All-State lineman in football.

== College career ==
Rice played college football for the LSU Tigers of Louisiana State University. He was on the freshman team in 1962 and was a letterman from 1963 to 1965. He was an All-American in 1965. He also named first-team All-SEC in 1964 and 1965. He participated in the Hula Bowl in 1966.

== Professional career ==
Rice was selected by the Chicago Bears in the first round, with the 12th overall pick, of the 1966 NFL draft and by the Houston Oilers in the third round, with the 21st overall pick, of the 1966 AFL draft. He chose to sign with the Oilers on January 2, 1966. He played in five games, starting one, for the Oilers during the 1966 season. Rice appeared in all 14 games, starting 13, in 1967, recording 6.5 sacks and two fumble recoveries. He also started for Houston in the 1967 AFL Championship Game, a 40–7 loss to the Oakland Raiders. Rice played in 11 games, all starts, in 1968, totaling 2.5 sacks and one fumble recovery. He appeared in seven games during his final season in 1970 and posted one sack. He had knee surgery on November 4, 1969.

== Coaching career ==
Rice coached at Memorial Hall School in Houston, Texas from 1971 to 1974.

He later served as an assistant coach to the defensive line on the Houston Oilers from 1975 to 1976.

== Personal life ==
Rice died on December 26, 2010, in Sealy, Texas.
