= Stine (singer) =

Albanian singer, songwriter and music producer (born 1981)

- Born: Ernest Duka; 29 January 1981 (age 45); Dibër, PSR Albania
- Occupations: Singer; songwriter; record producer
- Years active: 1997–present
- Spouse: Grazia
- Musical career
- Genres: Pop; R&B
- Label: Stine Records

Ernest Duka (born 29 January 1981), known professionally as Stine, is an Albanian singer, songwriter and record producer. He has been active in the Albanian music industry since the late 1990s.

== Early life ==
Duka was born in Dibër, Albania. As a child he showed an interest in both music and dance and studied piano at a primary music school until the seventh grade, before continuing his education at another school closer to home. During his school years he also practised hip hop dance and taught dance moves to his classmates.

In the late 1990s he began writing his own music. One of his early songs, written during the civil unrest in Albania in 1997, was performed at the secondary school festival "Rin-Fest", held at the Pyramid in Tirana. He experimented with composition at home using a small keyboard and simple recording devices.

Duka spent part of his adolescence in Germany, where he learned the language and took part in artistic activities, including dance competitions, before returning to Albania.

== Career ==
Stine first appeared on the Albanian music scene in 1997 as part of the group ETB 57. In 1999, he participated in the festival Vera Fest, where the group won first prize. During a later period in Germany, he continued to be involved in music and dance and has stated that he received awards in local competitions, experiences he has described as important for his artistic development.

Upon his return to Albania, Stine took part in the first edition of the television music festival Top Fest in 2004, in collaboration with ABI (Abigena Levanaj) with the song "Lady Lady", earning first prize. In April 2006, he participated in Top Fest 3 with the song "Ishe Ti", where he received the Internet Award.

He is the founder of Stine Records, a music studio based in Tirana, where he produces his own material and works with other singers.

In December 2025, Stine joined the fifth season of the reality television show Big Brother VIP Albania as housemate, broadcast on Top Channel.

== Personal life ==
Stine resides in Tirana, where he also operates his studio Stine Records. He has three sisters and one brother who live in Germany. He is married to singer Grazia, with whom he has one daughter.
