= Lazybrook/Timbergrove, Houston =

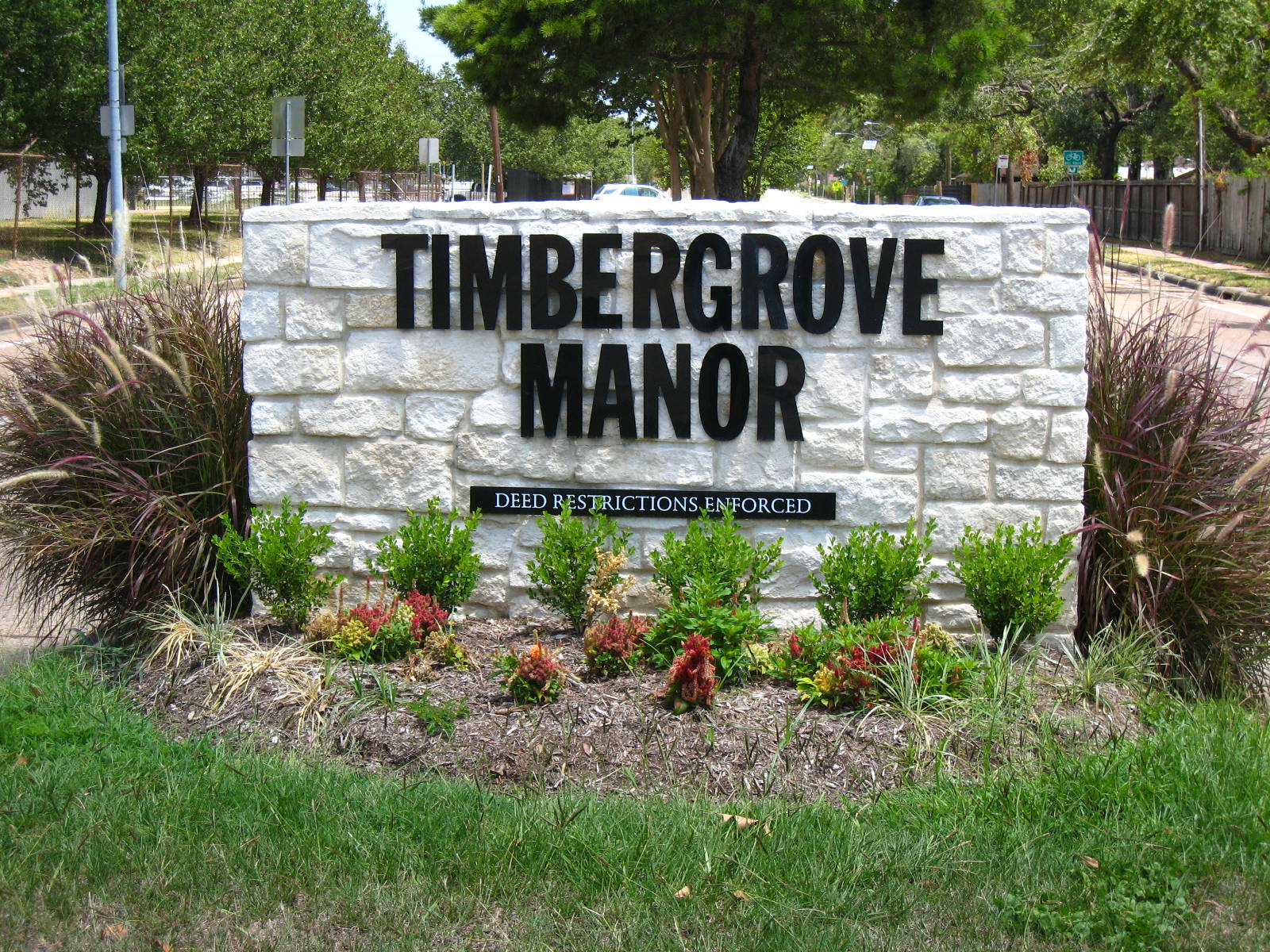
Timbergrove Manor, Houston, Texas entrance sign

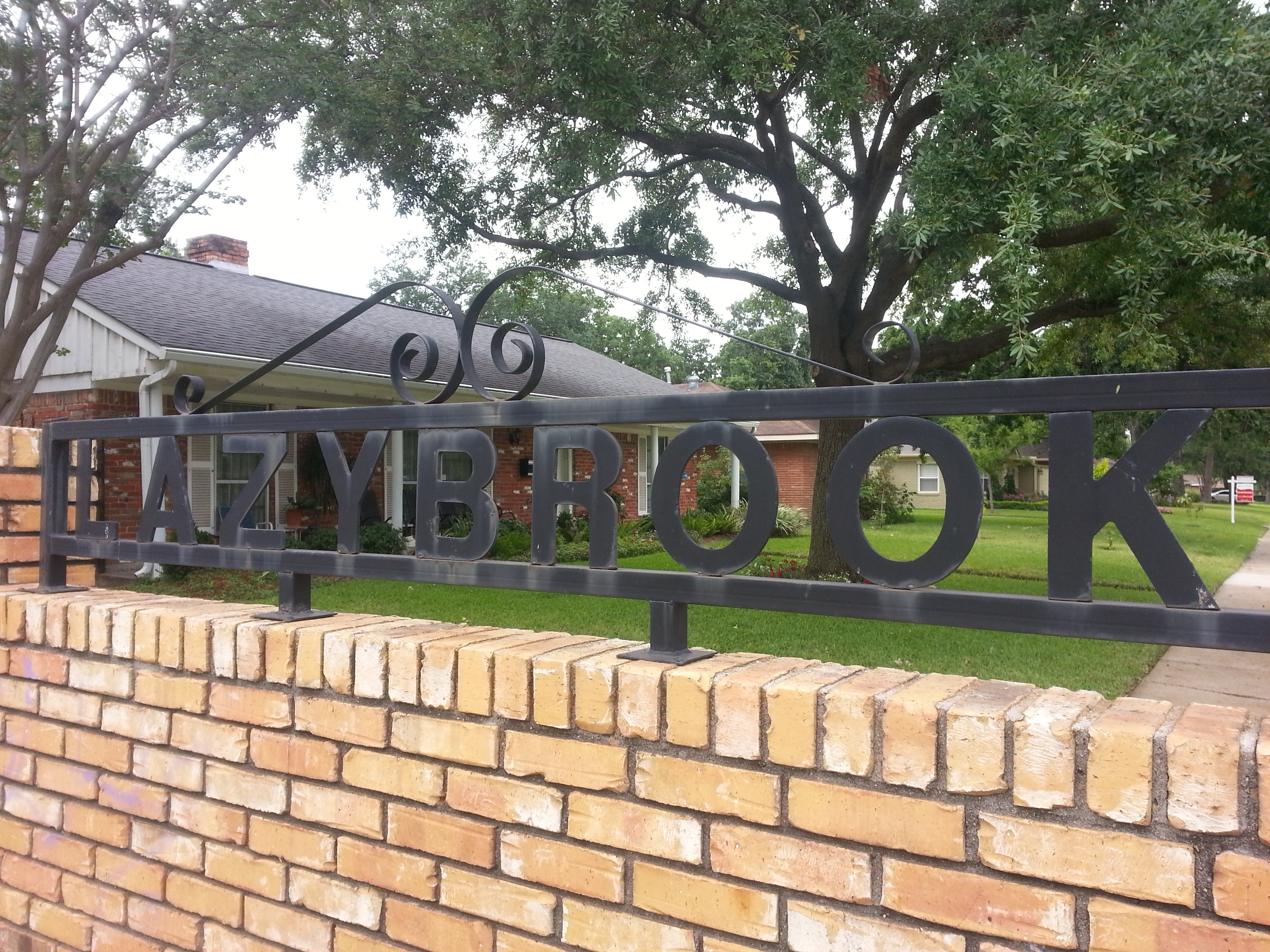
Lazybrook

Lazybrook and Timbergrove Manor (collectively, "Lazybrook/Timbergrove") are two adjoining, deed-restricted neighborhoods located approximately 7 miles northwest of Downtown Houston, Texas. Located inside the 610 Loop and just west of the Houston Heights, Lazybrook and Timbergrove Manor are situated along the wooded banks of White Oak Bayou in the near northwest quadrant of the city.

== History ==
Originally settled by German farmers in the late 1800s, the area was the site of a major oil discovery in the 1930s known as "Eureka." Reminders of that remain in a nearby railroad yard, still called the Eureka Yard, and St. John's German Lutheran Church, one of the original churches built by early settlers in 1891 which has been moved to Sam Houston Park.

Thiearea remained largely undeveloped until after World War II. However, by the 1950s, Timbergrove Manor, followed by Lazybrook, were built. Timbergrove Manor was named for the many pine trees sheltering the area, while Lazybrook was named for White Oak Bayou, which forms the neighborhood's eastern boundary.

In 2011 the Lazybrook/Timbergrove Super Neighborhood was formed.

== Government ==
Lazybrook/Timbergrove is located in the city limits of Houston and Houston City Council District C.

In October 2011, the Houston City Council officially recognized the Lazybrook/Timbergrove Super Neighborhood Council.

== Education ==
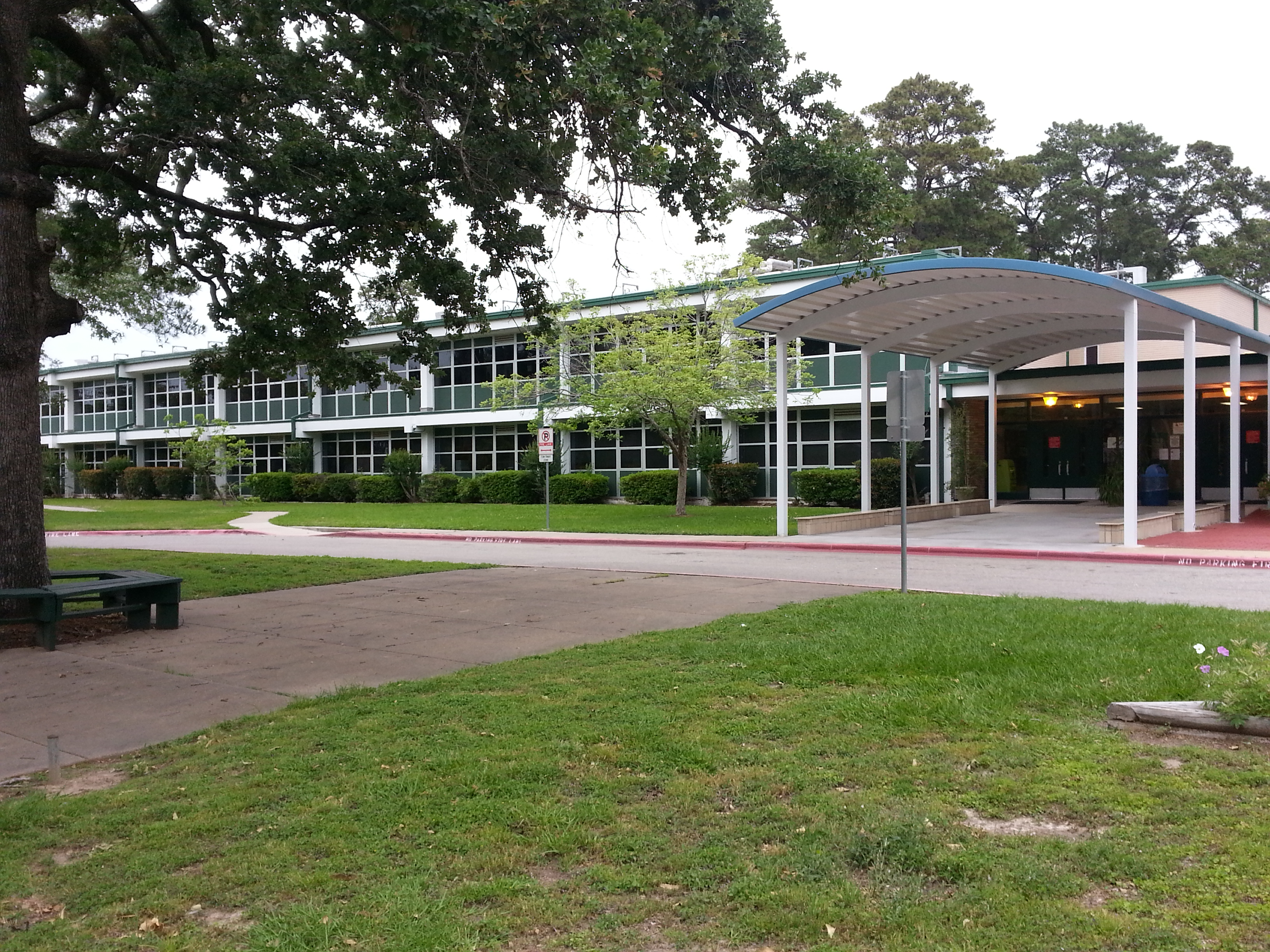
Sinclair Elementary School

Lazybrook/Timbergrove is served by Houston Independent School District. The neighborhood elementary school is Sinclair Elementary, although portion of Timbergrove Manor are zoned to Love Elementary in the Houston Heights. Sinclair Elementary was named after Thomas Albert Sinclair, founder of the Heights Hospital. Middle schools that serve Lazybrook/Timbergrove are Frank Black Middle School and Hamilton Middle School. Most area students are zoned to Waltrip High School in the Oak Forest neighborhood, with a small portion of Timbergrove Manor students zoned to Reagan High School in the Houston Heights.

The private Gateway Academy resides near Lazybrook/Timbergrove on the opposite side of the freeway. Memorial Hall School also resided near the community from 1986 until their closure in 2022.

== Parks and Recreation ==
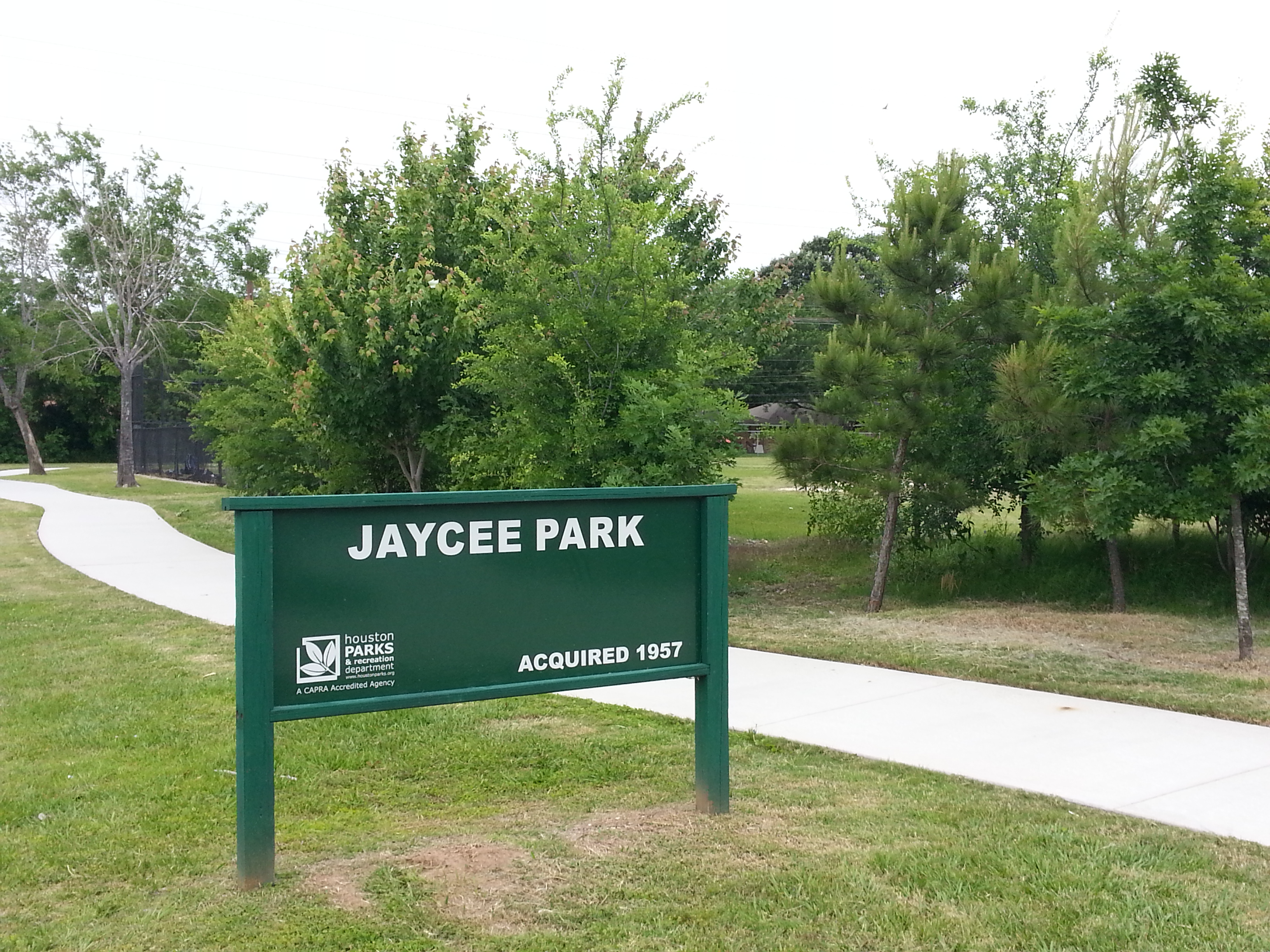
Jaycee Park

The City of Houston operates parks within and around the Lazybrook/Timbergrove. Parks in the area include:

- Lorraine Cherry Nature Preserve
- Timbergrove Manor Park
- Jaycee Park
- T.C. Jester Parkway

The West White Oak Bayou Trail begins in Timbergrove Manor and runs along the banks of the bayou, parallel to T. C. Jester Boulevard, from 11th Street, through Lazybrook and Oak Forest. The White Oak Bayou Trail provides bicyclists and pedestrians a 7.4-mile (11.9 km) long mostly concrete and asphalt trail. Passing through several parks, the trail is lighted and includes protective railings in some areas.
