= Education in Peja =

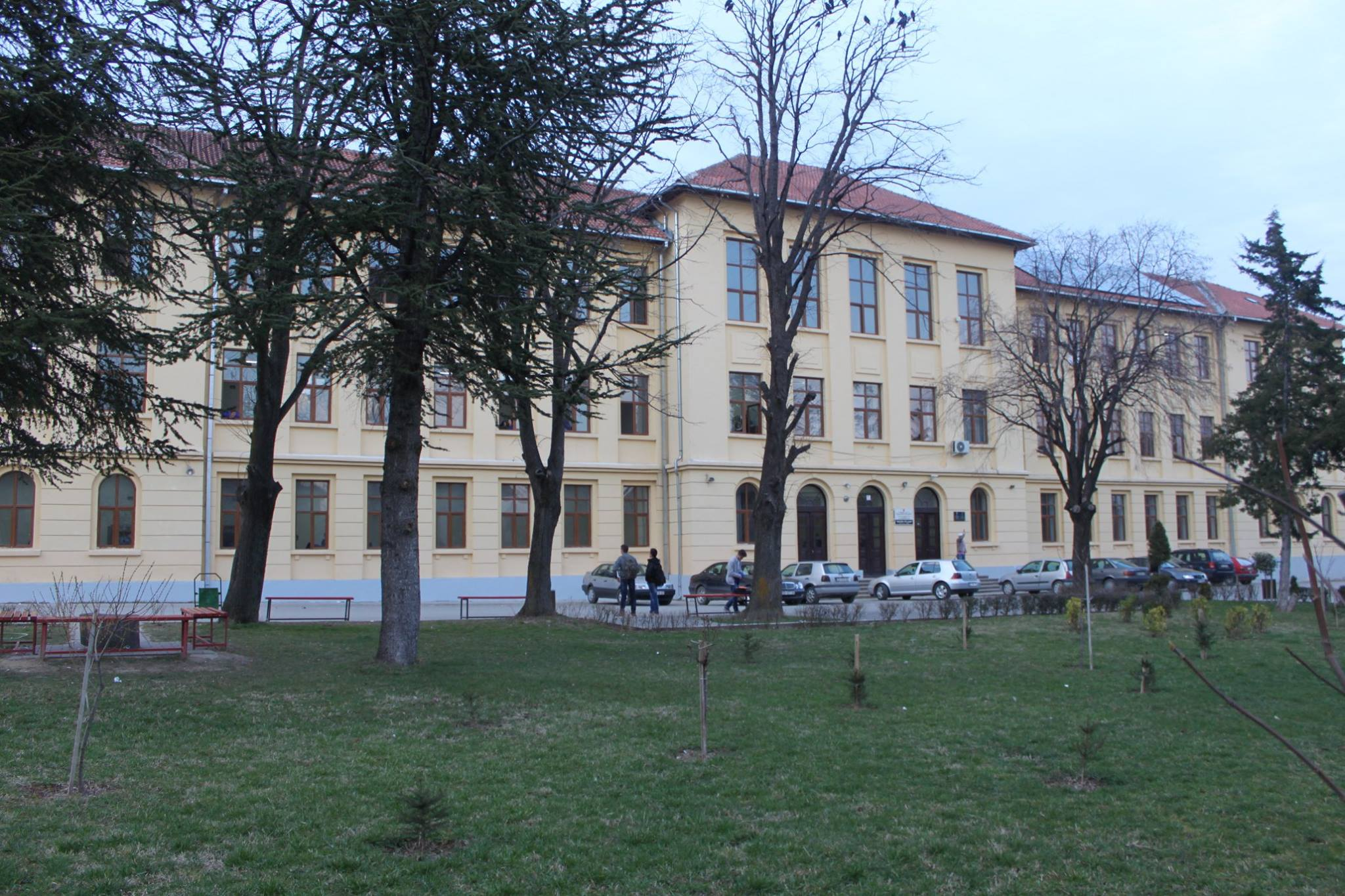
Bedri Pejani Gymnasium

Education in Peja, Kosovo is a based on a system with no tuition fees, mandatory for all children between ages 6 and 18. It consists of a nine-year basic comprehensive school (starting at age six and ending at age fifteen), secondary general and professional education commonly known as high school, and higher education (university). It also includes non-mandatory daycare programs for babies and toddlers, and a one-year "preschool". The school year runs from early September to late June of the following year. Winter break runs from late December to early January, dividing the school year into two semesters.

Peja is the only city in Kosovo that offers high school education in arts and general education for the visually impaired.

== Elementary education ==
Elementary education is divided in two parts. The first includes grades from 1 to 5 in which the students are taught by a single teacher. The second part is known as the lower secondary education, and includes grades from 6 to 9. Each subject is taught by a different teacher specialized in their subject.

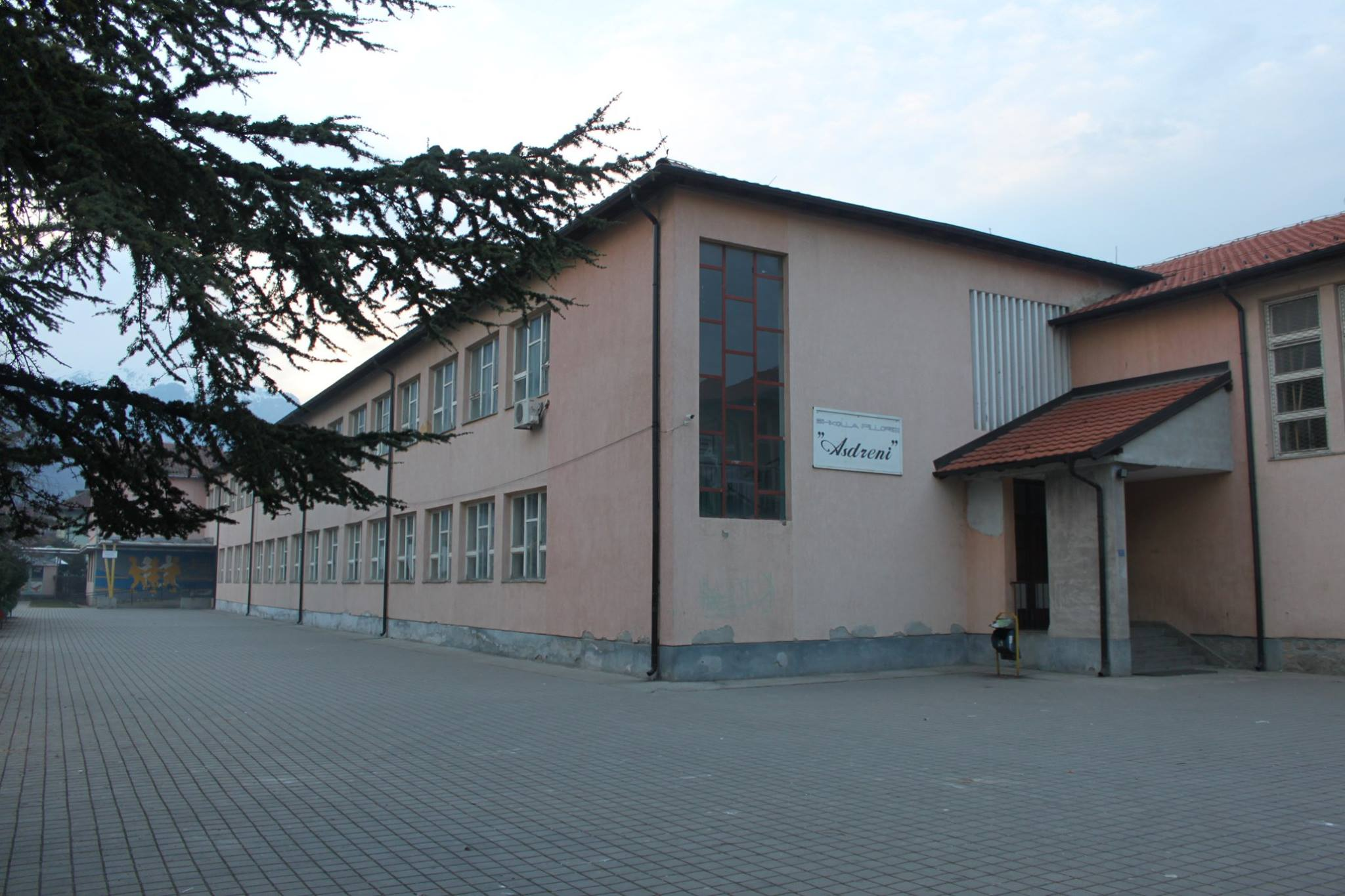
Elementary school Asdreni

=== Elementary schools ===
- Asdreni
- Vaso Pashë Shkodrani
- Lidhja Prizrenit
- Tetë Marsi
- Ramiz Sadiku
- Dardania
- Xhemajl Kada
- Smajl Hajdaraj
- Hil Mosi
- Lidhja e Pejes
- 7 Shtatori
- Sami Frasheri
- Skenderbeu
- Ali Kelmendi
- Rilindja
- Skender Çeku
- Haxhi Zeka
- Zef Serembe
- Naum Veqilhargji
- 28 Nëntori
- Fan Noli
- Dëshmorët e kombit
- Migjeni
- Pjetër Budi
- 2 Korriku
- Mehmet Shoshi
- Përparimi
- Janko Joviqeviq

== High school education ==
Secondary education includes grades from 10 to 12 and each school is divided into its own departments.

=== High school ===
- Gymnasium Bedri Pejani is divided into four departments: the natural sciences department, social studies, computing and mathematics and the language department.

== Professional education ==
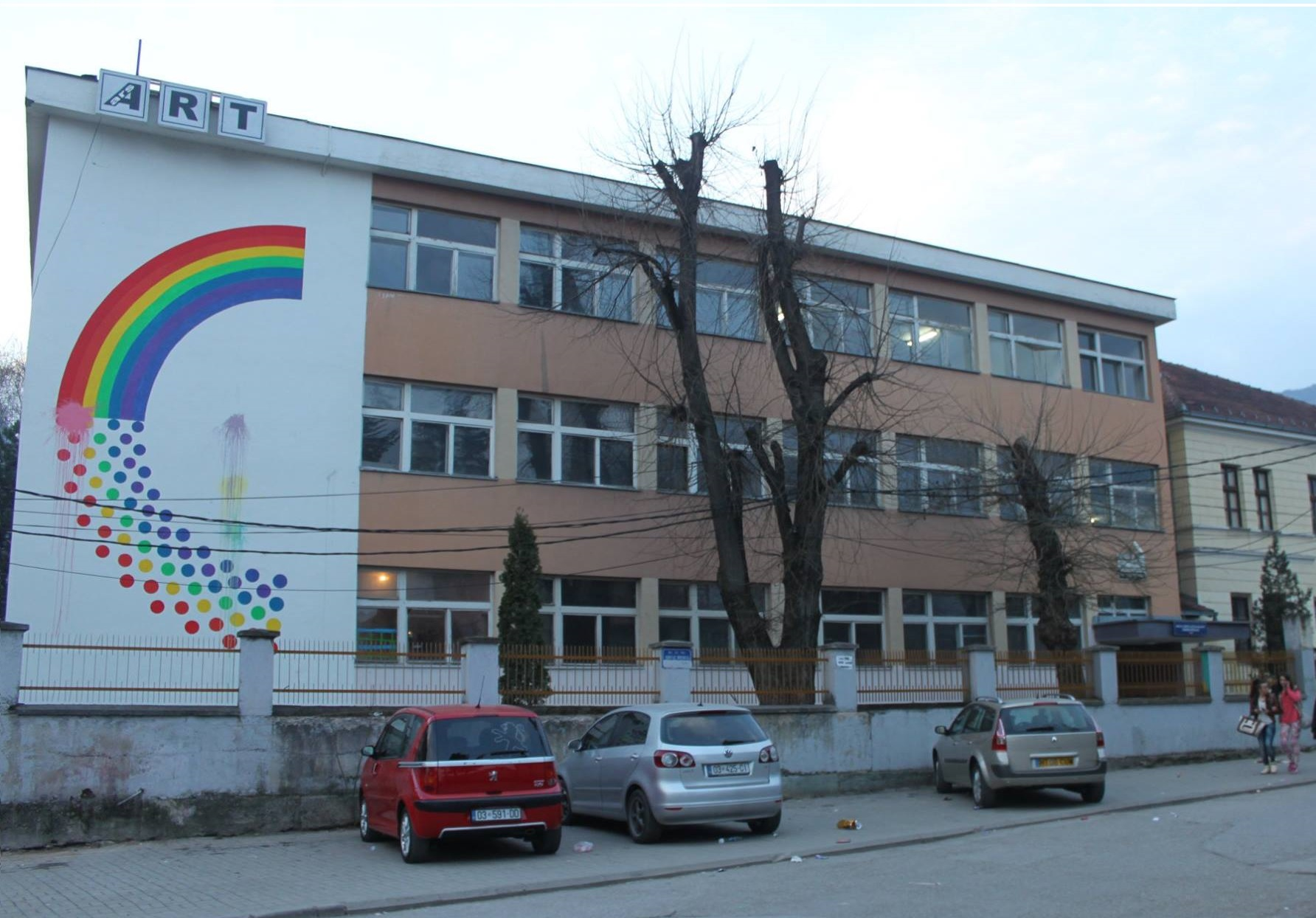
Art School Odhise Paskali

Professional education is a part of the educational system and professional training that enables students who have finished mandatory education to be included in a democratic society as active and competent participants, and to engage in the constantly changing labor market.

There are two professional high schools in Peja:

- Technical School Shaban Spahija in its composition has three separate objects in different parts of the city, with ten workshops: computing, electro installations, auto mechanic, metallurgy, auto coloring, hydro installing, construction, carpentry, tailoring and costume design which are equipped with adequate utensils for maintaining practical lessons. The learning process is divided into four professional subjects: electrotechnics, machinery, construction and textile.

Departments	Carpentry	Metallurgy	Electrotechnic	Construction	Textile
Number of students	138	225	442	138	48

- Economic School Ali Hadri offers education in juristics, food technology, customs, catering and tourism, veterinary medicine, banking and finance and business administration.

Departments	Catering and tourism	Juristics
Number of students	320	994

- School of Applied Arts Odhise Paskali is the only high school in Kosovo that offers secondary education in applied arts. Its departments consist of interior design, graphic design, ceramics, textile and painting.
- Medical School of Peja is a secondary education school which offers studies in the field of medicine. It is divided into five departments: general medicine, pharmacy, dentistry, nursing and midwifery and pediatrics.

== Private Schools ==
The private schools in Peja offer education from sixth to twelfth grade. The number of students per class is generally smaller than in public school and the schedule is longer.

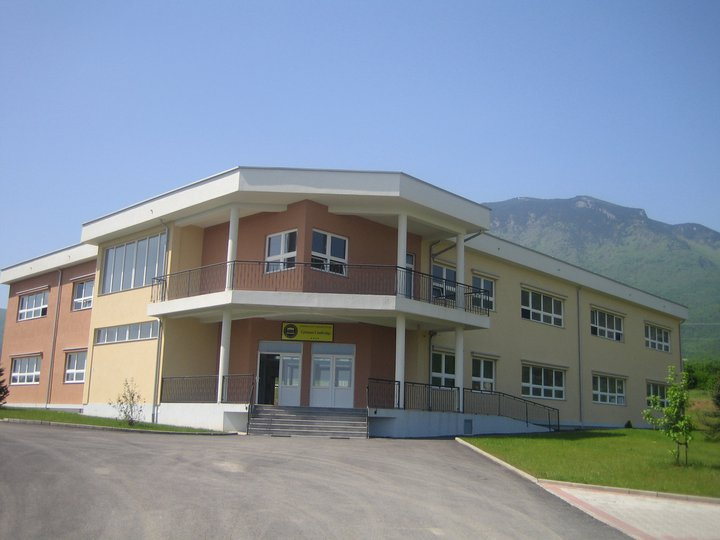
Cambridge Gymnasium

- Cambridge Gymnasium is the first private school in Peja. On October 10, 2006, it was licensed for lower secondary education and upper secondary education that offers studies in natural sciences, computing and mathematics.
- Euroschool

Number of students and teachers according to the 2011-2012 statistics:

	Kindergarten and preschools	Elementary	High schools	Private high schools
Number of students	1542	8433	6581	142
Number of teachers	91	380	443	18

Number of students based on ethnicity according to the 2011-2012 statistics:

	Albanian	Bosnian	Turk	RAE community	Others	In total
Kindergarten and preschool	1467	38	1	36	-	1541
Elementary schools	14195	459	1	638	2	15295
Secondary schools	6224	241	-	94	22	6581

== Other ==
=== Music school Halit Kasapolli ===
The "Halit Kasapolli" school of music is the only school of its kind in Peja. Named after the composer from Peja Halit Kasapolli, it was begun in 2008. In the absence of profile singing the students study Music Theory and Instruments: piano, clarinet, violin, flute and guitar.

=== School for the visually impaired Dr. Xheladin Deda ===
School for the blind and the visually impaired – resource center Dr. Xheladin Deda in Peja is the only institution in Kosovo that offers education to blind and visually impaired children. It was founded in 1982 and works as a public institution financed by the Kosovo Ministry of Education.

== Universities ==
=== Haxhi Zeka University ===
The public university Haxhi Zeka is originally a descendant of the Faculty of Applied Business Sciences (FABS) in Peja that was founded in 1960 with the decision of KSAK as an Economic-Commercial high school in Peja. At the beginning the school only consisted of the Commercial Business in the enterprise department and a small number of teachers.

Now it consists of the following faculties:

- Faculty of business
- Law school
- Faculty of Management in tourism, catering and environment
- Faculty of agribusiness
- Faculty of arts

=== European College Dukagjini ===
The European College Dukagjini began in October 2006, and immediately enrolled more than 600 students in one academic year (2006/2007). Based on this significant demand, expectations are that this university could, in one five-year cycle of studies, have at least 4000 to 5000 students.

European Dukagjini College includes the following faculties:

Faculty of Economy with the departments:

- Banking, Finance and Accounting
- Management and Informatics
- Business Administration
- Applied Informatics

Faculty of law with the departments:

- General Law
- International relations

Faculty of Biotechnology

- Department of Food Biotechnology

== See also ==
- Peja
- Education in Kosovo
- Haxhi Zeka University
