= Ferma VIP season 2 =

Ferma VIP
- Season 2
- Hosted by: Luana Vjollca
- No. of days: 82
- No. of contestants: 19
- Winner: Gerald "Big Basta" Xhari
- Runner-up: Anduel Kovaçi
- Companion show: Ferma Club
- No. of episodes: 24

Release
- Original network: Vizion Plus
- Original release: 31 March – 20 June 2025

Season chronology
- Next → Season 3

Ferma VIP 2, was the second season of Ferma VIP. The season started airing on 31 March 2025 on Vizion Plus, and ended after 82 days on 20 June 2025, with Luana Vjollca as the new host, replacing Fjoralba Ponari. Albano Bogdon was the headman of the farm, replacing Bes Kallaku. The two new opinionist in the live evictions shows were Kastro Zizo and Inida Gjata Zhaku. On 30 May 2025, in the eighteen live show, singer Adelina Ismaili replaced Kastro Zizo who was temporarily away. The whole season, live from the house, the viewers viewed in two live pay-per-view channels, with the name Ferma VIP 1 and Ferma VIP 2, which were available on Albanian television platform Tring.

On 20 June 2025, Gerald "Big Basta" Xhari was announced as the winner of the season, with Anduel Kovaçi as the runner-up.

== Contestants ==
On Day 1, sixteen celebrity contestants entered the farm during the launch show.

Contestant	Age	Notability	Entered	Exited	Status	Finish
Silvana Bushati	37	Former volleyball player	Day 1	Day 8	Eliminated 1st on April 7, 2025	19th
Albi Lushi	36	Poet	Day 1	Day 15	Eliminated 2nd on April 14, 2025	18th
Daniela Shima	26	Model	Day 7	Day 22	Eliminated 3rd on April 21, 2025	17th
Visar "Gani Gërmia" Dërmaku	30	Comedian	Day 7	Day 29	Eliminated 4th on April 28, 2025	16th
Keisi Meshau	18	Miss Albania	Day 1	Day 33	Ejected on May 2, 2025	15th
Ron Zaiti		Singer	Day 1	Day 36	Eliminated 5th on May 5, 2025	14th
Nur Al Kahzali	27	Influencer	Day 1	Day 40	Eliminated 6th on May 9, 2025	13th
Alba Pollozhani	28	Reality TV Star	Day 1	Day 44	Walked on May 13, 2025	12th
Blerim "Lim" Hoti	31	Rapper	Day 1	Day 45	Walked on May 14, 2025	11th
Frederik Ndoci	67	Singer & writer	Day 1	Day 61	Eliminated 7th on May 30, 2025	10th
Nenna	29	Singer	Day 36	Day 68	Eliminated 8th on June 6, 2025	9th
Ester Alushi	21	Actress	Day 1	Day 71	Eliminated 9th on June 9, 2025	8th
Elinara Shehu	49	Singer	Day 1	Day 78	Eliminated 10th on June 16, 2025	7th
Ylli Dreshaj	25	Model	Day 1	Day 78	Eliminated 11th on June 16, 2025	6th
Erand Sojli	52	Actor	Day 1	Day 82	Fifth Place on June 20, 2025	5th
Besiana "Big Mama" Kasami	39	Singer	Day 1	Day 82	Fourth Place on June 20, 2025	4th
Endrit "Andrea" Kuci	32	TikToker	Day 1	Day 82	Third Place on June 20, 2025	3rd
Anduel Kovaçi	25	Singer	Day 1	Day 82	Runner-up on June 20, 2025	2nd
Gerald "Big Basta" Xhari	39	Singer	Day 1	Day 82	Winner on June 20, 2025	1st

== Challenge ==
=== Nominations Influence ===
Each week, contestants compete in a Challenge, which may unleash good or bad consequences on the nomination process.

As Farmer of the Week, one contestant was required to determine who would take part in the challenge. The Farmer selected the first duelist, who then had to choose the second duelist. The second duelist was subsequently given the authority to nominate one of the remaining contestants to face the public vote. The challenge was then contested between the first and second duelist, with the loser facing the public vote together with the nominated contestant.

Week	Air date	Farmer of the week	1st Duelist (By Farmer)	2nd Duelist (By 1st Duelist)	Winner
1	April 4, 2025	Frederik	Alba	Big Mama	Big Mama
4	April 25, 2025	Alba	Nur	Gani	Nur
7	May 12, 2025	Ester	Anduel, Big Basta	Erand, Frederik	Big Basta, Erand

In another system, the contestants were divided into teams to compete in a challenge. The teams played against each other, and the losing team was required to face the public vote.

Week	Air date	Farmer participation		Winner
2	April 11, 2025	Andrea, Anduel, Big Mama, Erand, Ester, Frederik, Gani, Ylli	Alba, Albi, Big Basta, Daniela, Elinara, Keisi, Nur, Ron	Andrea, Anduel, Big Mama, Erand, Ester, Frederik, Gani, Ylli
3	April 18, 2025	Gani, Keisi	Daniela, Nur	Gani, Keisi
5	May 1, 2025	Anduel, Ylli		Ester, Lim
5	May 1, 2025	Elinara, Frederik		Ester, Lim
5	May 1, 2025	Big Basta, Nur		Ester, Lim
5	May 1, 2025	Ester, Lim		Ester, Lim
5	May 1, 2025	Erand, Ron		Ester, Lim
5	May 1, 2025	Andrea, Keisi		Ester, Lim
5	May 2, 2025	Elinara, Ylli, Ron	Anduel, Erand, Frederik	Anduel, Erand, Frederik
8	May 19, 2025	Anduel, Frederik	Nenna, Ylli	Nenna, Ylli
9	May 26, 2025	Big Mama, Ester, Nenna, Ylli	Anduel, Big Basta, Elinara, Erand	Big Mama, Ester, Nenna, Ylli
10	June 6, 2025	Nenna	Ylli	Ylli
11	June 9, 2025	Andrea, Elinara, Ester, Ylli		Andrea
11	June 13, 2025	Elinara	Ylli	Ylli
11	June 13, 2025	Andrea	Anduel	Anduel
12	June 16, 2025	Andrea	Ylli	Andrea
12	June 20, 2025	Andrea, Anduel, Big Basta, Big Mama, Erand		Andrea, Anduel, Big Basta
12	June 20, 2025	Andrea, Anduel, Big Basta, Big Mama		Andrea, Anduel

=== Budget Challenge ===
Each week, contestants compete in the Budget Challenge, and then they are informed of the percentage of the budget they have earned for food.

Week	Air date	Farmer participation	Budget won
2	April 7, 2025	All farmers	75%
3	April 14, 2025	All farmers	35%
4	April 21, 2025	All farmers	90%
5	April 28, 2025	All farmers	88%
6	May 5, 2025	Big Basta	100%
7	May 16, 2025	All farmers	75%
8	May 23, 2025	All farmers	10%
9	May 30, 2025	All farmers	70%
10	June 6, 2025	All farmers	50%

== Nominations table ==
Color key:

Winner
Runner-up
Other finalists
Farmer of the week
Nominated for eviction
Immune from eviction
No voting
Evicted
Walked
Ejected
Saved by the public votes
Challenge winner

	Week 1	Week 2	Week 3	Week 4	Week 5	Week 6	Week 7	Week 8	Week 9	Week 10	Week 11		Week 12		
	Week 1	Week 2	Week 3	Week 4	Week 5	Week 6	Week 7	Week 8	Week 9	Week 10	Day 71	Day 75	Day 78	Final	
Farmer of the week	Frederik	Anduel	Frederik	Alba, Lim	Big Mama	Ylli	Ester	Andrea	Ester	Anduel	none				
Viewers’ Favorite	none	Lim	none	Lim	Big Mama	none	none	none	Andrea	Big Mama	none	Big Basta	Anduel	none	
Viewers’ least Favorite	none		Daniela, Gani, Keisi, Nur	none		none	none	none	none	Nenna, Ylli	Andrea, Elinara, Ester, Ylli	none			
Big Basta	No voting	Nominated	No voting	Nominated	Nominated	Nominated	Frederik	No voting	Nominated	Saved by the public	No voting	Finalist	Finalist	Winner (Day 82)	
Anduel	No voting	Challenge winner	No voting	No voting	Challenge winner	Nominated	Erand	Nominated	Nominated	Farmer of the week	No voting	Challenge winner	Finalist	Runner-up (Day 82)	
Andrea	No voting	Challenge winner	No voting	Nominated	Nominated	Nominated	No voting	Farmer of the week	Exempt	Saved by the public	Challenge winner	Nominated	Challenge winner	Third Place (Day 82)	
Big Mama	Silvana	Challenge winner	No voting	No voting	Farmer of the week	Nominated	No voting	No voting	Challenge winner	Finalist	Finalist	Finalist	Finalist	Fourth Place (Day 82)	
Erand	No voting	Challenge winner	No voting	Nominated	Challenge winner	No voting	Nenna, Ylli	No voting	Nominated	Saved by the public	Finalist	Finalist	Finalist	Fifth Place (Day 82)	
Ylli	No voting	Challenge winner	No voting	Nominated	Nominated	Farmer of the week	Challenge winner	Challenge winner	Challenge winner	Challenge winner	Nominated	Challenge winner	Nominated	Evicted (Day 78)	
Elinara	No voting	Nominated	No voting	No voting	Nominated	No voting	Nominated	No voting	Nominated	Saved by the public	Nominated	Nominated	Evicted (Day 78)		
Ester	No voting	Challenge winner	No voting	No voting	Challenge winner	No voting	Anduel, Big Basta	No voting	Challenge winner	Saved by the public	Nominated	Evicted (Day 71)			
Nenna	Not in the Farm					No voting	Challenge winner	Challenge winner	Challenge winner	Nominated	Evicted (Day 68)				
Frederik	Alba	Challenge winner	Farmer of the week	No voting	Challenge winner	No voting	Elinara, Lim	Nominated	Nominated	Evicted (Day 61)					
Lim	No voting	Exempt	No voting	Andrea, Erand, Ylli	Challenge winner	No voting	Nominated	Walked (Day 45)							
Alba	Big Mama	Nominated	No voting	Nur	Nominated	Nominated	No voting	Walked (Day 44)							
Nur	No voting	Nominated	Nominated	Gani	Nominated	Nominated	Evicted (Day 40)								
Ron	No voting	Nominated	No voting	No voting	Nominated	Evicted (Day 36)									
Keisi	No voting	Nominated	Challenge winner	No voting	Ejected (Day 33)										
Gani	Not in the Farm	Challenge winner	Challenge winner	Big Basta	Evicted (Day 29)										
Daniela	Not in the Farm	Nominated	Nominated	Evicted (Day 22)											
Albi	No voting	Nominated	Evicted (Day 15)												
Silvana	Nominated	Evicted (Day 8)													
Notes	1	2, 3	4	5, 6	7, 8, 9, 10	11	12	13, 14	2, 3, 14	15	16	17	18	19	
Up for nomination	Alba	Andrea, Anduel, Big Mama, Erand, Ester, Frederik, Gani, Ylli	Gani, Keisi	Gani	none		Anduel, Elinara, Frederik, Lim	Anduel, Frederik	Big Mama, Ester, Nenna, Ylli	none	Andrea; Elinara; Ester; Ylli	Andrea, Anduel, Elinara, Ylli	none		
Up for nomination	Big Mama	Alba, Albi, Big Basta, Daniela, Elinara, Keisi, Nur, Ron	Daniela, Nur	Nur	none		Big Basta, Erand, Nenna, Ylli	Nenna, Ylli	Anduel, Big Basta, Elinara, Erand	none	Andrea; Elinara; Ester; Ylli	Andrea, Anduel, Elinara, Ylli	none		
Challenge winner	Big Mama	Andrea, Anduel, Big Mama, Erand, Ester, Frederik, Gani, Ylli	Gani, Keisi	Nur	none		Big Basta, Erand, Nenna, Ylli	Nenna, Ylli	Big Mama, Ester, Nenna, Ylli	none	Andrea	Anduel, Ylli	none		
Nominated for eviction	Alba, Silvana	Alba, Albi, Big Basta, Daniela, Elinara, Keisi, Nur, Ron	Daniela, Nur	Andrea, Big Basta, Erand, Gani, Ylli	Alba, Andrea, Big Basta, Elinara, Nur, Ron, Ylli	Alba, Andrea, Anduel, Big Basta, Big Mama, Nur	Anduel, Elinara, Frederik, Lim	Anduel, Frederik	Anduel, Big Basta, Elinara, Erand, Frederik	Nenna, Ylli	Elinara; Ester; Ylli	Andrea, Elinara	Andrea, Ylli	Andrea, Anduel, Big Basta, Big Mama, Erand	
Ejected	none				Keisi	none									
Walked	none						Alba, Lim	none							
Evicted	Silvana; Fewest votes to save	Albi; Fewest votes to save	Daniela; Fewest votes to save	Gani; Fewest votes to save	Ron; Fewest votes to save	Nur; Fewest votes to save	Eviction cancelled	Eviction cancelled	Frederik; Fewest votes to save	Nenna; Lost Duel	Ester; Fewest votes to save	Elinara; Fewest votes to save	Ylli; Lost Duel	Erand; Fewest votes (out of 5)	Big Mama; Fewest votes (out of 4)
Evicted	Silvana; Fewest votes to save	Albi; Fewest votes to save	Daniela; Fewest votes to save	Gani; Fewest votes to save	Ron; Fewest votes to save	Nur; Fewest votes to save	Eviction cancelled	Eviction cancelled	Frederik; Fewest votes to save	Nenna; Lost Duel	Ester; Fewest votes to save	Elinara; Fewest votes to save	Ylli; Lost Duel	Andrea; Fewest votes (out of 3)	Anduel; Fewest votes (out of 2)
Evicted	Silvana; Fewest votes to save	Albi; Fewest votes to save	Daniela; Fewest votes to save	Gani; Fewest votes to save	Ron; Fewest votes to save	Nur; Fewest votes to save	Eviction cancelled	Eviction cancelled	Frederik; Fewest votes to save	Nenna; Lost Duel	Ester; Fewest votes to save	Elinara; Fewest votes to save	Ylli; Lost Duel	Big Basta; Most votes to win	

=== Notes ===
- ^Note 1: After Frederik had received the most votes, he became the Farmer of the Week. As part of his duties, he was required to determine who would take part in the challenge. He chose Alba as the first contestant. Alba was then asked to select another participant, and she decided on Big Mama. Big Mama was subsequently given the authority to nominate one of the remaining contestants to face the public vote, and she chose Silvana. The challenge was then held between Alba and Big Mama. Big Mama emerged as the winner, while the loser, Alba, had to face the public vote together with Silvana.
- ^Note 2: The viewers voted for their favorite Farmer. The contestant with the most votes had immunity.
- ^Note 3: The contestants were divided into teams to compete in a challenge, with the losing team facing the public vote.
- ^Note 4: The viewers voted for their favourite Farmer. The four contestants who received the fewest votes had to take part in a paired challenge, with the pairs being decided by Frederic, who was the Farmer of the Week. The first duelists were Gani and Keisi, while the second duelists were Daniela and Nur. Daniela and Nur lost the challenge and therefore faced the public vote.
- ^Note 5: As the Farmer of the Week, Alba was required to determine who would take part in the challenge. She chose Nur as the first contestant. Nur was then asked to select another participant, and she decided on Gani. Gani was subsequently given the authority to nominate one of the remaining contestants to face the public vote, and he chose Big Basta. The challenge was then held between Nur and Gani. Nur emerged as the winner, while the loser, Gani, had to face the public vote together with Big Basta.
- ^Note 6: The viewers voted for their favorite Farmer. The contestant with the most votes had the power to send 3 more contestants to face the public vote, with Big Basta and Gani. Lim had the most votes and choose for Andrea, Erand and Ylli.
- ^Note 7: Alba, Andrea, Big Basta and Nur were automatically nominated due to breaking the rules.
- ^Note 8: The viewers voted for their favorite Farmer. The contestant with the most votes had immunity. Big Mama had the most votes and won immunity.
- ^Note 9: The contestants were divided into teams of two to compete in a challenge, with the winner team were saved by facing the public vote. Ester and Lim won the challenge and were saved.
- ^Note 10: The contestants were divided into teams to compete in a challenge, with the losing team facing the public vote. Elinara, Ylli and Ron were the losing team.
- ^Note 11: Alba, Andrea, Anduel, Big Basta, Big Mama and Nur were automatically nominated due to breaking the rules.
- ^Note 12: As the Farmer of the Week, Ester was required to determine who would take part in the challenge. She chose Anduel and Big Basta as the first contestants. Anduel and Big Basta were then asked to select another participants, and Anduel decided on Erand and Big Basta decided on Frederik. Erand and Frederik were subsequently given the authority to nominate two of the remaining contestants, Erand chose Nenna and Ylli and Frederik chose Elinara and Lim. The challenge was then held on 2 teams between Anduel and Frederik and Big Basta and Erand. Big Basta and Erand emerged as the winner, while the loser, Anduel and Frederik, had to face the public vote together with Elinara and Lim. After Alba and Lim left the Farm, the eviction was cancelled.
- ^Note 13: The viewers voted to decide which farmers would take part in a paired challenge. The four farmers who received the most votes were selected to compete in the challenge. Andrea, as the Farmer of the Week, was responsible for deciding how the pairs would be formed. The first duelists were Anduel and Frederik, while the second duelists were Nenna and Ylli. Anduel and Frederik lost the challenge and therefore faced the public vote.
- ^Note 14: On Day 54, Andrea, as the Farmer of the Week, had the power to cancel the eviction and had to choose between Anduel and Frederik. Whoever he chose would automatically face every eviction of the season until they were evicted. Andrea chose Frederik.
- ^Note 15: The viewers voted for the first finalist. Big Mama received the most votes and advanced to the final. Nenna and Ylli received the fewest votes and had to take part in a challenge, where the losing farmer would be eliminated.
- ^Note 16: The viewers voted for their favourite farmer. The farmers with the fewest votes had to take part in a challenge. The winner of the challenge was saved, while the losing farmers had to face the public vote.
- ^Note 17: The farmers had to take part in a challenge. The winner of the challenge was saved, while the losing farmers had to face the public vote.
- ^Note 18: The viewers voted for the fourth finalist. Anduel received the most votes and advanced to the final. Andrea and Ylli received the fewest votes and had to take part in a challenge, where the losing farmer would be eliminated.
- ^Note 19: At the final round, the public voted for the winner.
