= Ferma VIP =

Albanian reality competition show and TV series

- Genre: Reality competition
- Based on: The Farm by Strix, Fremantle
- Directed by: Holta Dulaku; Eduart Grishaj
- Presented by: Fjoralba Ponari; Luana Vjollca; Arbana Osmani
- Country of origin: Albania
- Original language: Albanian
- No. of seasons: 3
- No. of episodes: 72

Production
- Executive producers: Holta Dulaku (2024); Arjan Shkëmbi (2025–)
- Production location: Albania
- Camera setup: Multi-camera
- Production companies: Vizion Plus; Tring

Original release
- Network: Vizion Plus
- Release: 22 March 2024 – present

Related
- Ferma CLUB

Ferma VIP, also known as Ferma VIP Albania, is an Albanian celebrity reality television and game show, based on the Swedish reality competition franchise The Farm, originally created by Strix in 2001. It premiered on March 22, 2024 and is broadcast on Vizion Plus. The programme was initially presented by Fjoralba Ponari for the first season. Ponari declined to return as presenter on the second season, and the role was taken up by Luana Vjollca. From the third season onwards, the programme has been presented by Arbana Osmani, replacing Vjollca.

The live shows or live eviction shows were seen every Monday and Friday. Also in the same channel, from Monday to Friday on afternoon was seen the daily summary, for one hour. Every Saturday was covered a spin-off show with the name Ferma Club. The viewers can watch for the whole season live from the farm in two live pay-per-view channels, with the name Ferma VIP 1 and Ferma VIP 2, which are available on Albanian TV platform Tring.

== Format ==
Each season, a group of 16 to 19 celebrities, such as actors, singers, models, digital influencers, or media personalities, known as Farmers, living together on a farm, isolated from the outside world for three months. The contestants must adapt to traditional farm life as it was 100 years ago and need to prove abilities to work in the country: wake up very early, take care of the cows, wash the horses, collect eggs from chickens, harvest greens, and more. The farm overseer, known as the "Agai," assigns challenges which the participants must complete to avoid penalties or elimination. Each week one contestant is selected as the Farmer of the Week, by the contestant evicted in the previous week. Each week, one of the farmers is evicted by a public vote, with the last farmer remaining winning a cash prize of €100,000. The show airs daily and each season lasts about three months.

== Cast ==
The first season was hosted by Fjoralba Ponari. Besart Kallaku was the headman of the farm. Armina Mevlani, Enkel Demi and Sonila Meço were announced as the opinionist at the live shows. For the second season, Luana Vjollca replaced Fjoralba Ponari as the main host. Albano Bogdo was the headman of the farm, replacing Besart Kallaku. The two new opinionist in the live evictions shows were Kastro Zizo and Inida Gjata Zhaku. On 8 March 2026, Vizion Plus released the first trailer for the third season, in which Arbana Osmani was featured and announced as the new host. On 23 March 2026, it was announced that Armina Mevlani would return as an opinionist after a one-season hiatus, while Einxhel Shkira and Ermal Mamaqi would serve as opinionists for the first time.

Ferma VIP Cast
Person	Season		
Person	1 (2024)	2 (2025)	3 (2026)
Host
Fjoralba Ponari			
Luana Vjollca			
Arbana Osmani			
Headman
Besart Kallaku			
Albano Bogdo			
Opinionist
Armina Mevlani			
Enkel Demi			
Sonila Meço			
Kastro Zizo			
Inida Gjata Zhaku			
Einxhel Shkira			
Ermal Mamaqi			

== Season overview ==
Season	Episodes	Originally released			Days	Farmers	Winner	Runner(s)-up	Prize money
Season	Episodes	First released	Last released	Network	Days	Farmers	Winner	Runner(s)-up	Prize money
1	24	22 March 2024	12 June 2024	Vizion Plus	83	22	Dijonis Biba	Florian Agalliu	€100,000
2	24	31 March 2025	20 June 2025	Vizion Plus	82	19	Gerald "Big Basta" Xhari	Anduel Kovaçi	€100,000
3	24	27 March 2026	15 June 2026	Vizion Plus	81	30	Mimoza Ahmeti	Ilir Shaqiri	€129,000

== Series results ==
Key
Winner
Runner-up
Third place

=== Season 1 (2024) ===
The season aired twice weekly from 22 March 2024 to 12 June 2024, with Dijonis Biba winning the competition. The season featured 22 contestants from various entertainment and media backgrounds. Some participants voluntarily left or were disqualified during the competition.

Ferma VIP season 1 finalists
Contestant	Occupation	Day entered	Day exited	Result
Dijonis Biba	Influencer	1	83	Winner
Florian Agalliu	TV presenter, actor	1	83	Runner-up
Çiljeta Xhilaga	Singer	1	83	Third place
Ditea Berisha	Graphic designer	1	83	Fourth place
Renis Gjoka	Singer	1	83	Fifth place
Gordana "Baby G" Kingji	Singer	1	83	Sixth place

=== Season 2 (2025) ===
The second season continued the format with new celebrity participants including actors, singers, models, and media personalities. Contestants entered on different days, and regular eliminations narrowed the group. On 20 June 2025, Gerald "Big Basta" Xhari was announced as the winner of the season, with Anduel Kovaçi as the runner-up.

Ferma VIP season 2 finalists
Contestant	Occupation	Day entered	Day exited	Result
Gerald "Big Basta" Xhari	Singer	1	82	Winner
Anduel Kovaçi	Singer	1	82	Runner-up
Endrit "Andrea" Kuci	TikToker	1	82	Third place
Besiana "Big Mama" Kasami	Singer	1	82	Fourth place
Erand Sojli	Actor	1	82	Fifth place

=== Season 3 (2026) ===
The third season began airing on 27 March 2026, with new celebrity contestants. On 15 June 2026 Mimoza Ahmeti was announced as the winner of the season, with Ilir Shaqiri as the runner up. In this season the prize was €200.000 but since the farmers broke many rules, Agai announced that they would lose money everytime they broke a rule, arriving at €129.000.

Ferma VIP season 3 finalists
Contestant	Occupation	Day entered	Day exited	Result
Mimoza Ahmeti	Poet & writer	1	81	Winner
Ilir Shaqiri	Dancer	8	81	Runner-up
Elvis Pupa	Actor & comedian	1	81	Third place
Soni Malaj	Singer	1	81	Fourth place
Bujaka	DJ	18	81	Fifth place

== Companion show ==
=== Ferma Club ===
A spin-off show with the name Ferma Club, was broadcast every Saturday on Vizion Plus. The show features debates and conversations about the latest goings inside and outside the farm with a studio audience and celebrity panel, and with the first eliminated farmer who are usually invited to the studio after leaving. The first season began airing on 6 April 2024, with Alma Celaj and Syrjan Rahova as the presenters. The second season began airing on 19 April 2025, with season 1 finalist Ditea Berisha, as the presenter of the show, replacing Celaj and Rahova. The third season began airing on 11 April 2026 on Vizion Plus. It is hosted by Florian Agalliu, with Albano Bogdo and Çiljeta Xhilaga as opinionists, all of whom previously participated as contestants in the first season of Ferma VIP.
