= Mentor Arifaj =

Kosovo-Albanian engineer

Mentor Arifaj is a Kosovo-Albanian engineer and politician. He is the incumbent Deputy Minister of Economy of the Republic of Kosovo.
