= Tingulli 3nt =

Kosovo-Albanian hip hop group

- Origin: Pristina, Kosovo
- Genres: Hip hop
- Years active: 1996–present
- Label: Babastars
- Members: Getoar Selimi; Agon Amiga
- Past members: Besa Gashi; Jeton Topusha

Tingulli 3nt, also known as Tingulli Trent, is a Kosovo-Albanian hip hop group formed in 1996. The group members are Getoar Selimi and Agon Amiga. His brother "Liberian Selimi" was also active in the rap scene during his teenage years. Tingulli 3nt took the Albanian music scene by a storm in the early 2000s with their always innovative, groundbreaking songs and music videos. In the late 2000s it became the most known and the most influential hip hop group in the scene. In the summer of 2010 Tingulli 3nt collaborated with Ermal Fejzullahu, a famous Albanian folk singer. The video of the song was reportedly censured, because of the excessive nudity exposed in the images.
