= Alban Dudushi =

Albanian television presenter (born 1972)

- Born: December 22, 1972 (age 53); Tirana, PSR Albania
- Education: Academy of Arts of Albania
- Occupations: Journalist; television presenter
- Years active: 1995–present
- Known for: creator and host of Top Show
- Spouse: Bieta Sulo

Alban Dudushi (born December 22, 1972) is an Albanian television presenter and journalist. He is known for hosting talk shows focusing on political and social issues, including Top Show and Top Show Magazine on Top Channel, and 3D on RTSH.

== Early life and education ==
Dudushi was born in Tirana, where he completed his secondary education in 1992. From 1992 to 1996, he studied acting at the Academy of Arts in Tirana, graduating from the Faculty of Performing Arts. During his studies, he participated in stage performances and acted in a feature film.

== Career ==
Dudushi began working in journalism during the 1990s, contributing to the newspaper Koha Jonë and the magazine AKS. He later co-founded Radio Koha, where he produced political and cultural talk programs. During the Kosovo War in 1999, he reported from the Kukës area on developments related to the refugee crisis.

In 2001, he joined Top Channel as part of its launch team. He was the creator and host of the political talk show Top Show, which aired from 2002 until 2014, and continued under the name Top Show Magazine until 2020.

In October 2023, he launched the program 3D on the Albanian public broadcaster RTSH. The show airs four evenings per week and features interviews and discussions related to current affairs and politics.

== Television ==
In addition to political programming, Dudushi has also presented major entertainment formats. He co-hosted several editions of the music competition Top Fest on Top Channel during the 2000s. He was also occasionally featured as a presenter on the variety show E Diell.

== Awards ==
In 2020, Dudushi received the “Barleti” Award from Marin Barleti University in acknowledgment of his work in media and journalism.

== Personal life ==
Dudushi is married to Bieta Sulo, a television presenter known for hosting the afternoon program Pasdite në Top Channel, on Top Channel.
