= Ermal Fejzullahu =

Kosovo-Albanian singer (born 1988)

- Born: 22 August 1988 (age 37); Pristina, Kosovo
- Occupations: Singer; songwriter
- Years active: 1997–present

Ermal Fejzullahu (born 22 August 1988) is a Kosovo-Albanian singer.

== Early life ==
Ermal Fejzullahu was born on 22 August 1988 in Pristina, then part of the Socialist Federal Republic of Yugoslavia, present-day Kosovo. He is the son of well-known Albanian singer Sabri Fejzullahu.

== Career ==
In the summer of 2010 Fejzullahu had a song collaboration with Tingulli 3nt, a famous Albanian rapper group. The video of the song was reportedly censored, because of the excessive nudity exposed in the images.

He was the winner of Top Fest edition of 2015.

== Personal life ==
He is married to Ariana Fejzullahu and together they have four children named Art, Buna, Era and Ana.
