= Haxhi Zeka University =

Public university in Peja, Kosovo

Coordinates: 42.656623°N 20.292595°E

- Universiteti Haxhi Zeka
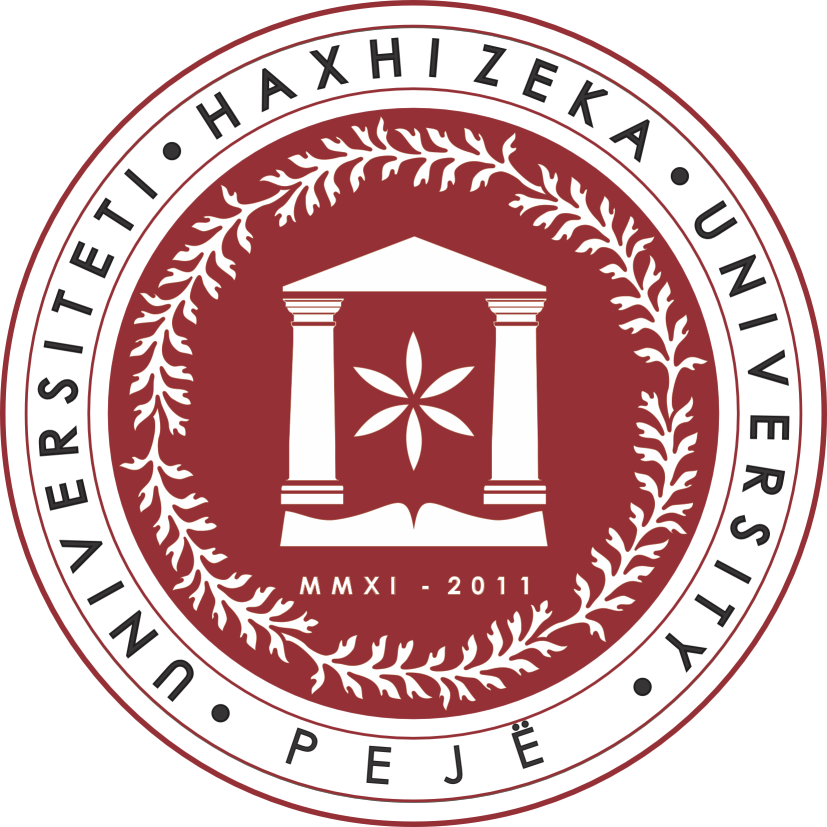
- Logo of University Haxhi Zeka
- Former names: The Higher School of Economics and Commerce (Shkolla e lartë ekonomike dhe komerciale)
- Type: Public research university
- Established: 2011; 15 years ago
- Affiliations: Balkan Universities Network Erasmus
- Budget: €3.8 million
- Vice Chancellor: Armand Krasniqi
- Students: 10,055
- Location: Pejë, District of Pejë, Kosovo
- Campus: Urban
- Colors: Dark red and white
- Nickname: UHZ
- Website: https://www.unhz.eu/

Haxhi Zeka University (Albanian: Universiteti Haxhi Zeka) is a public university in Peja, Kosovo.

On November 11, 2012, the Parliament of Kosovo in its regular session has ratified the establishment of the Public University "Haxhi Zeka" Peja. The first generation of students has enrolled, in October 2012. Public University "Haxhi Zeka" is founded as a public institution of higher education.

== See also ==
- Education in Peja
- University of Pristina
