= Luana Vjollca =

Albanian presenter and singer (born 1981)

- Born: 2 September 1991 (age 34); Tirana, Albania
- Occupations: Television presenter; host; model; singer
- Years active: 2007–present
- Relatives: Marina Vjollca (sister)
- Musical career
- Label: Sony

Luana Vjollca (born 2 September 1991), is an Albanian television presenter, singer and former dancer. She is also known for hosting the second season of the Albanian reality show Ferma VIP in 2025.

== Life and career ==
Luana Vjollca was born on 2 September 1991 into an Albanian family of the Roman Catholic faith in the city of Kuçovë, Albania. Her parents originated from the city of Shkodër. Her elder sister, Marina Vjollca, is also a well-established television presenter and model in the Albanian-speaking world.

== Discography ==
=== Singles ===
==== As lead artist ====
Title	Year	Peak chart positions	Album
Title	Year	ALB	Album
"Tërbohu"	2013	—N/a	Non-album single
"Askush s'do ta besojë"	2014	—N/a	Non-album single
"Luanët" (featuring Dj Blunt and Real 1)	2014	—N/a	Non-album single
"E jemja"	2015	—N/a	Non-album single
"Tirana Lifestyle" (featuring Getoar Selimi)	2015	—N/a	Non-album single
"Ai"	2016	—	Non-album single
"Je veç ti"	2016	—	Non-album single
"Benzina"	2017	—	Non-album single
"Mi dhe flakë mallit tim" (featuring Bujar Qamili)	2018	—	Non-album single
"Vetem ty"	2018	—	Non-album single
"Boll u bo tu vujt"	2019	—	Non-album single
"Sonte" (featuring Dani)	2019	—	Non-album single
"Yalla Habibi" (featuring Faydee)	2019	5	Non-album single
"Ti amo"	2019	—	Non-album single
"Pa panik"	2020	—	Non-album single
"Locos" (with Jay Santos)	2020	1	Non-album single
"1 mijë vjet"	2021	—	Non-album single
"—" denotes a recording that did not chart or was not released in that territory.
