= Me ty =

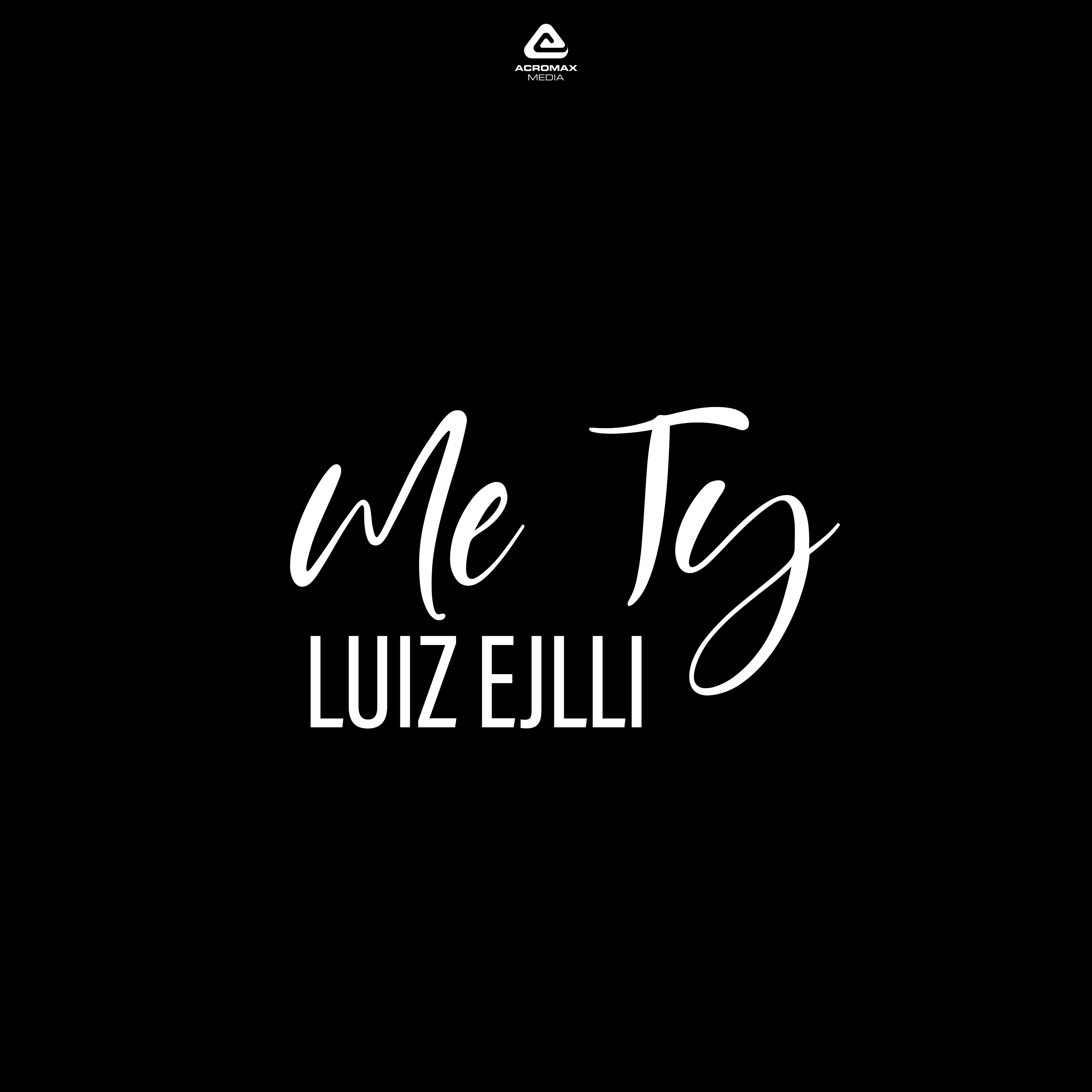
- Rerelease cover

Single by Luiz Ejlli
- Language: Albanian
- English title: "With you"
- Released: 10 March 2023 (Note: The song was originally released through Music Nation on 14 February 2023.)
- Genre: Pop
- Length: 2:41
- Label: Acromax
- Songwriter: Elgit Doda
- Producer: Elgit Doda

Luiz Ejlli singles chronology
"Ra një yll" (2017)	"Me ty" (2023)	"2 Shotsa" (2023)

"Me ty" (Albanian pronunciation: [mɛ ˈty]; transl. "With you") is a song by Albanian singer Luiz Ejlli. It is an Albanian-language love song dedicated to Albanian television presenter Kiara Tito. Written and produced by Elgit Doda, the song was originally released through Music Nation as a single for digital download and streaming on 14 February 2023. On 10 March, it was rereleased by Acromax Media GmbH.

Commercially, "Me ty" peaked the first place on The Top List. It received positive receptions by its listeners, and was accompanied by a music video uploaded to Top Channel's official YouTube channel on the same date of the song's original release.

== Background and composition ==
"Me ty" was recorded inside the "house" of the Albanian reality competition Big Brother VIP. It was written, composed and produced by Albanian singer-songwriter and producer Elgit Doda. The song was originally released as a single for digital download and streaming through Music Nation on 14 February 2023. On 10 March, it was rereleased by Acromax Media GmbH, with a new single cover.

Musically, it is an Albanian-language pop love song dedicated to Albanian television presenter Kiara Tito. The chorus of the song includes "Veç du me t’majtë në krahë / E me t’thanë sa shumë të du / T'lutem merri sytë e mi / Shikoje veten ti te unë" (I just want to hold you in [my] arms / And to tell you how much I love you / Please take my eyes / See yourself at me).

== Music video ==
An accompanying music video was uploaded to Top Channel's official YouTube channel on 14 February 2023. The music video is itself a compilation of clips of Ejlli and Tito together inside the venue of the Albanian reality competition Big Brother VIP, in which they are currently participating in, incorporating clips of Ejlli, wearing headphones, singing on a microphone. The music video gained a million views 9 hours after its upload.

== Charts ==
Chart (2023)	Peak position
Albania (The Top List)	1

== Release history ==
Release dates and formats for "Me ty"
Region	Date	Format(s)	Label	Ref.
Various	14 February 2023	Digital download; streaming	Music Nation	
Various	10 March 2023	Digital download; streaming	Acromax	
