= Big Brother VIP (Albanian TV series) season 4 =

Big Brother VIP
- Season 4
- Hosted by: Ledion Liço
- No. of days: 120
- No. of housemates: 38
- Winner: Besart "Gjesti" Kelmendi
- Runner-up: Rozana Radi
- Companion shows: Big Brother VIP – Fans' Club; Big Brother Radio; Post Big Brother VIP
- No. of episodes: 127

Release
- Original network: Top Channel
- Original release: 21 December 2024 – 19 April 2025

Season chronology
- ← Previous; Season 3 Next → Season 5

Big Brother VIP 4, was the fourth season of Big Brother VIP, hosted by Ledion Liço. The season began airing on 21 December 2024 on Top Channel, and ended after 120 days on 19 April 2025. The whole season, live from the house, was viewed in two live pay-per-view channels, with the name Big Brother VIP 1 and Big Brother VIP 2, which are available on Albanian television platform DigitAlb. Arbër Hajdari returned as opinionist in the live evictions shows and was joined by Neda Balluku, replacing Ori Nebijaj.

For the first time in Big Brother Albania history, there would be civilians who live in the house alongside celebrities housemates.

The spin-off show Big Brother VIP – Fans' Club was hosted this season, by season 3 finalist Heidi Baci. The two opinionists were season 2 housemate Ronaldo Sharka and Big Brother VIP Kosova season 2 finalist Shqipe Hysenaj. The 60-minute radio show Big Brother Radio returned for the third season, with Elona Duro and Atalanta Kërçyku.

On 19 April 2025, Besart "Gjesti" Kelmendi was announced as the winner of the season, with Rozana Radi as the runner-up.

== Production ==
On 16 June 2024, Top Channel renewed the show for a fourth season.

In June 2024, the host of the show, Ledion Liço was asked in his interview for the show Top Arena on Top Channel, when will Big Brother VIP 4 start and Liço answered "We will wait a little longer". In August 2024, the executive producer, Sara Hoxha has shared her morning coffee on social networks, where it is written Big Brother VIP 4 is coming. In October 2024, on Instagram were posted the designs from the new house. On 22 October 2024, it was announced that the fourth season will begin airing in December 2024. On 13 November 2024, Big Brother VIP producer Sara Hoxha, released footage for the first time, showing what the Big Brother VIP 4 house will look like. On 17 November 2024, was announced that Ledion Liço would return for the fourth season, as host.

On 6 December 2024, Top Channel announced that Arbër Hajdari will be returning for his fourth season as an opinionist and it was also announced that the new opinionist will be Neda Balluku, who was a housemate on the fourth season of Big Brother Albania.

=== Celebrities and civilians ===
On 26 November 2024, Top Channel announced that in addition to the celebrities who participated in the three previous seasons, ordinary people will also take part this season. Οn the same day, applications for the show were open. On 24 December 2024, six additional housemates entered the civilians house where the public voted for two of them to move into the main House.

== Housemates ==
On Day 1, sixteen celebrity housemates entered the house during the launch show. On Day 4, six civilians housemates entered the civilians house, where the public voted for two of them to move into the Big Brother VIP house. Besart "Gjesti" Kelmendi previously participated on the third season of Big Brother VIP Kosova, he entered the Big Brother VIP Albania house a day after his eviction.

Celebrity	Age on entry	Type	Notability	Day entered	Day exited	Status
Besart "Gjesti" Kelmendi	24	Celebrity	Singer	18	120	Winner
Rozana Radi	45	Celebrity	Actress, Singer & Songwriter	1	120	Runner-up
Laert Vasili	50	Celebrity	Actor	1	120	3rd Place
Egli Tako	27	Celebrity	Actress & Singer	1	76	4th Place
Egli Tako	27	Celebrity	Actress & Singer	85	120	4th Place
Gerta Gixhari	44	Celebrity	TV Host & Journalist	1	46	Evicted
Gerta Gixhari	44	Celebrity	TV Host & Journalist	46	113	Evicted
Loredana Brati	25	Celebrity	Model	1	113	Evicted
Jozefin "Jozi" Marku	28	Celebrity	Singer	1	12	Evicted
Jozefin "Jozi" Marku	28	Celebrity	Singer	12	47	Evicted
Jozefin "Jozi" Marku	28	Celebrity	Singer	67	113	Evicted
Danja Koka	32	Celebrity	Model	12	113	Evicted
Aldo Marku	35	Celebrity	Film Producer	1	99	Evicted
Aldo Marku	35	Celebrity	Film Producer	99	106	Evicted
Florian "Kelly" Carkanji	36	Celebrity	Singer	57	102	Evicted
Valbona Mhilli	33	Celebrity	Journalist	1	95	Evicted
Rizarta Hoxha	21	Celebrity	Influencer	57	92	Evicted
Gladiola "Ola" Zenelaj	26	Celebrity	Reality TV Star	57	92	Evicted
Klejdi "Vserlo" Dervishi	23	Celebrity	Singer	57	88	Evicted
Migena "Mikela" Shpendi	26	Celebrity	Influencer	64	85	Evicted
Shkëlzen "Xeni" Oruçi	29	Celebrity	Entrepreneur & Dentist	64	81	Evicted
Amber Candy	38	Celebrity	Makeup Artist	1	25	Evicted
Amber Candy	38	Celebrity	Makeup Artist	67	78	Evicted
Arban "G-Bani" Përlala	43	Celebrity	Singer	1	51	Walked
Arban "G-Bani" Përlala	43	Celebrity	Singer	67	74	Walked
Faik "Riki" Sllamniku	25	Celebrity	Singer	64	71	Evicted
Tahir "Tiri Gjoci"	31	Celebrity	Singer	36	71	Evicted
Livia Brunga	28	Celebrity	Reality TV Star	1	64	Evicted
Krisa Caushi	24	Celebrity	TV Host	36	60	Evicted
Indrit Murati	34	Celebrity	Journalist	36	57	Evicted
Klajdi Musabelliu	41	Celebrity	Singer , Actor	1	43	Evicted
Gert Ferra	43	Celebrity	Actor	18	39	Evicted
Bernard Hulme	46	Civilians	DJ & producer	8	36	Evicted
Gëzim "Xum" Allushi	30	Celebrity	Social Media Personality	1	32	Evicted
Ols Abazi	51	Celebrity	Executive Director & Film Producer	1	29	Evicted
Igli Veizi	44	Celebrity	Entrepreneur	18	23	Walked
Gramos Bajçinovci	33	Civilians	Film Producer	8	22	Evicted
Petro Xhori	31	Celebrity	Singer & producer	12	22	Evicted
Arsida Çerpja	34	Civilians	Beauty coach & digital educator	8	18	Evicted
Marius "Zebervoki" Dervishi	29	Celebrity	Actor & Comedian	1	15	Evicted
Fevzije "Gili" & Redon Berani	58 & 25	Celebrity	Singer	1	6	Walked
Civilians House
Arsida Çerpja	34	Civilians	Beauty coach & digital educator	4	8	Selected
Gramos Bajçinovci	33	Civilians	Film Producer	4	8	Selected
Bernard Hulme	46	Civilians	DJ & producer	4	8	Selected
Briseida Xhelaj & Jori Elezi	37 & 27	Civilians	Doctor & Bartender	4	8	Not Selected
Eda Osmerija	23	Civilians	Student	4	8	Not Selected
Ejona Dorëzeza	31	Civilians	Hairdresser & beautician	4	8	Not Selected

== Format ==
=== Housemate exchanges ===
On 20 December 2024, Ledion Liço announced on the show on Top Channel Shqipëria live, that for the first time on the Albanian version would be a housemate exchange with another country. It was revealed the exchange will be with the Italian version Grande Fratello, which current broadcast the eighteenth season. The housemate exchange, however, never took place.

=== Round Trip Ticket ===
Like in the last seasons, the housemates would have the Round Trip Ticket, which would allow the Housemates who picked it to re-enter the house immediately following eviction. Envelopes could only be opened by a Housemate following their eviction. If a Housemate opened their envelope prior to their eviction, their card would be voided. Unlike last season not all housemates would have the Round Trip Ticket. On Day 8, Big Brother has organized a game during prime show, in which Aldo, Egli and Zebërvoki have raced to secure the Round Trip Ticket that will serve the housemates. The three housemates had to find as many tickets as possible within one minute, but taking care to get the packages that had tickets inside and not coffee. At the end of the challenge, only 9 Lori Caffe bags had tickets inside them and it was Egli who had to choose who to share them with. Egli gave tickets to Aldo, Amber, Laert, Livia, Loredana, Ols, Rozana and Zebërvoki and kept the last one for herself. On Day 12, after the eviction of Jozi, Valbona broke the Emergency glass, with the name "One Way Ticket/Round Trip Ticket", and Jozi returned on the house, but the 9 housemates that have the tickets would lose them and no one could return on the house, after their elimination. On Day 63, Gjesti as Head of Household, had the power to give to 5 housemates the Round Trip Ticket, but only one ticket was Round Trip Ticket, the other four tickets were One Way Ticket. He gave the tickets to Aldo, Danja, Kelly, Livia and Tiri.

=== Emergency Kit Glass ===
New this season was the Emergency Kit Glass, where there are six boxes of advantages in the house, which housemates can take advantage of. During the first prime show of this season, host Ledion Liço warned that opening the box could lead to a punishment. On Day 92, three new Emergency Kits were put on the house, the Golden Power Box, the Key and the Phone.

Emergency Kit	Name	Glass Broke by	Day	Advantage	Punishment
1	"One Way Ticket/Round Trip Ticket"	Valbona	12	On Day 12, Jozi was evicted by the public votes, but then Valbona broke the Emergency glass and Jozi could return on the game.	All housemates, who had the Round Trip Ticket, lost their tickets and no one could return on the house, after their elimination.
2	"€ 5.000"	G-Bani	9	G-Bani won € 5.000.	G-Bani loses the right to win the € 100.000 grand prize, if he is the winner of Big Brother VIP 4.
3	"Ring"	none	—N/a	—N/a	—N/a
4	"Information from the outside world"	Loredana	48	Loredana will take information from Outside.	If Loredana wins Big Brother VIP 4, she will win € 80.000, € 20.000 less than the grand prize.
5	"Immunity"	Gjesti	74	The envelope said "you can choose to exchange yourself with three housemates".	But like every good thing that has a bad thing, with Gjesti's exit from the nomination, all the housemates went to televoting.
6	"Invitation"	Aldo	21	Aldo will meet his daughter.	Aldo had the power to nominate one housemate and that whoever he chose would automatically face every eviction of the season until they were evicted. Aldo chose to nominate Gerta.
7	"Golden Power Box"	Ola	92	All housemates could win the € 100.000 grand prize, while Egli and Jozi could only won € 50.000, because they reentered the house after some days.	Ola could not won immunity until her exit from the house.
8	"The Key"	Jozi	93	Jozi could pick one housemate to sleep and stay together for 24-hour on a special room. He choose Loredana.	Jozi had to sleep in the garden for one night.
9	"The phone"	Gerta	97	One housemate could make a phone call.	Gerta could not make a phone call.

== Nominations table ==
Key
– Celebrities
– Civilians
– 2-in-1 housemate called 'Laert & Valbona', their nominations counted as one. (Week 10 - Week 13)

	Week 1		Week 2		Week 3		Week 4		Week 5		Week 6		Week 7		Week 8		Week 9		Week 10			Week 11			Week 12			Week 13			Week 14		Week 15			Week 16	Week 17 Final	
	Day 4	Day 8	Day 15		Day 18	Day 22	Day 25	Day 29	Day 32	Day 36	Day 39	Day 43	Day 46		Day 53	Day 57	Day 60	Wildcard	Day 67	Day 71		Day 74	Day 78		Day 81	Day 85		Day 88	Day 92		Day 95	Day 99	Day 102	Day 106		Week 16	Week 17 Final	
Viewers’ Favorite	none				Amber, Rozana		none			G-Bani, Gerta, Gjesti	none																											
Viewers’ least Favorite	none				Petro, Gramos		none			none																												
Gjesti	Not in House				Exempt	Klajdi, Valbona	Nominated	No; Nominations	Jozi, Loredana	Egli	Nominated	Danja, Loredana	Not eligible	No; Nominations	Indrit, Tiri	No; Nominations	No; Nominations	Not eligible	No; Nominations	Nominated	Nominated	Saved	No; Nominations	Nominated	Mikela, Kelly	Not eligible	Kelly, Rizarta	Nominated	Nominated	No; Nominations	Danja	Nominated	Gerta	Nominated	No; Nominations	Nominated	Winner (Day 120)	
Rozana	Not eligible	Aldo, Jozi	No; Nominations	Amber, Gerta	No; Nominations	Jozi, Xum	Nominated	No; Nominations	Gert, Jozi	Nominated	Nominated	Danja, Loredana	Not eligible	No; Nominations	Indrit, Valbona	Nominated	No; Nominations	Not eligible	Nominated	Nominated	Nominated	Nominated	Nominated	No; Nominations	Mikela, Danja	Not eligible	Rizarta, Aldo	Nominated	Nominated	No; Nominations	Aldo	Nominated	Jozi	Exempt	Egli, Laert	Exempt	Runner-up (Day 120)	
Laert	Not eligible	Jozi, Loredana	Nominated	G-Bani, Jozi	No; Nominations	G-Bani, Xum	Nominated	No; Nominations	G-Bani, Gert	Nominated	No; Nominations	G-Bani, Jozi	Not eligible	No; Nominations	Gjesti, Rozana	No; Nominations	No; Nominations	Not eligible	No; Nominations	Nominated	Nominated	Nominated	Nominated	Nominated	Mikela, Aldo	Not eligible	Aldo, Rizarta	Nominated	Nominated	Nominated	Aldo	Nominated	Danja	Nominated	Nominated	Exempt	Third Place (Day 120)	
Egli	Not eligible	G-Bani, Gerta	No; Nominations	Gerta, Rozana	No; Nominations	Loredana, Valbona	Nominated	Nominated	Gert, Loredana	Saved	No; Nominations	Indrit, Loredana	Not eligible	No; Nominations	Valbona, Indrit	Nominated	No; Nominations	Not eligible	Nominated	Nominated	Nominated	Nominated	Walked (Day 76)			Nominated	Exempt	Nominated	Nominated	No; Nominations	Rozana	Nominated	Gerta	Nominated	Nominated	Nominated	Fourth Place (Day 120)	
Gerta	Not eligible	Jozi, Valbona	No; Nominations	G-Bani, Livia	No; Nominations	Aldo, G-Bani	Nominated	No; Nominations	Aldo, Egli	Klajdi	No; Nominations	G-Bani, Indrit	Nominated	No; Nominations	Egli, Gjesti	Nominated	No; Nominations	Not eligible	Nominated	Nominated	No; Nominations	Nominated	No; Nominations	No; Nominations	Laert & Valbona, Jozi	Not eligible	Laert & Valbona, Ola	No; Nominations	Nominated	No; Nominations	Jozi	Nominated	Rozana	Exempt	Exempt	Nominated	Evicted (Day 113)	
Loredana	Not eligible	Klajdi, Valbona	No; Nominations	Gramos, Xum	No; Nominations	Xum, Klajdi	Nominated	No; Nominations	Bernard, Klajdi	Nominated	No; Nominations	Indrit, Livia	Not eligible	No; Nominations	Livia, Indrit	Nominated	Nominated	Not eligible	No; Nominations	Nominated	No; Nominations	Nominated	No; Nominations	No; Nominations	Vserlo, Danja	Not eligible	Vserlo, Ola	No; Nominations	Nominated	No; Nominations	Danja	Nominated	Gjesti	Nominated	No; Nominations	Nominated	Evicted (Day 113)	
Jozi	Not eligible	Gerta, Laert	Nominated	Arsida, Gramos	No; Nominations	Livia, Klajdi	Nominated	No; Nominations	Bernard, Klajdi	Nominated	No; Nominations	Indrit, Tiri	Not eligible	No; Nominations	Ejected (Day 47)			Comeback housemate	No; Nominations	Nominated	No; Nominations	Nominated	No; Nominations	Nominated	Vserlo, Mikela	Not eligible	Vserlo, Ola	No; Nominations	Nominated	No; Nominations	Aldo	Nominated	Rozana	Nominated	No; Nominations	Nominated	Re-evicted (Day 113)	
Danja	Not in House		Exempt	Livia, Ols	No; Nominations	Valbona, Jozi	Nominated	No; Nominations	Gert, Jozi	Saved	No; Nominations	Livia, Rozana	Not eligible	No; Nominations	Egli, Livia	Nominated	No; Nominations	Not eligible	No; Nominations	Nominated	No; Nominations	Nominated	No; Nominations	No; Nominations	Rozana, Mikela	Not eligible	Aldo, Loredana	Nominated	Nominated	No; Nominations	Gjesti	Nominated	Gjesti	Nominated	No; Nominations	Nominated	Evicted (Day 113)	
Aldo	Not eligible	Laert, Klajdi	Nominated	Gerta, Rozana	No; Nominations	Valbona, Ols	Nominated	No; Nominations	Bernard, Rozana	Nominated	No; Nominations	G-Bani, Tiri	Not eligible	No; Nominations	Livia, Rozana	No; Nominations	No; Nominations	Not eligible	Nominated	Nominated	No; Nominations	Nominated	No; Nominations	Nominated	Vserlo, Ola	Not eligible	Vserlo, Rozana	No; Nominations	Nominated	No; Nominations	Jozi	Nominated	Rozana	Nominated	Re-evicted (Day 106)			
Kelly	Not in House															Exempt	Exempt	Not eligible	No; Nominations	Nominated	No; Nominations	Nominated	No; Nominations	Saved	Vserlo, Laert & Valbona	Not eligible	Vserlo, Ola	No; Nominations	Nominated	No; Nominations	Jozi	Nominated	Evicted (Day 102)					
Valbona	Not eligible	Jozi, Ols	No; Nominations	Arsida, Egli	No; Nominations	Egli, Xum	Nominated	No; Nominations	Bernard, Danja	Nominated	No; Nominations	Indrit, Krisa	Not eligible	No; Nominations	Livia, Indrit	Nominated	No; Nominations	No; Nominations	No; Nominations	Nominated	Nominated	Nominated	Nominated	Nominated	Mikela, Aldo	Not eligible	Aldo, Rizarta	Nominated	Nominated	Nominated	Evicted (Day 95)							
Rizarta	Not in House															Exempt	Exempt	Not eligible	Nominated	Nominated	No; Nominations	Nominated	No; Nominations	No; Nominations	Vserlo, Ola	Not eligible	Ola, Vserlo	No; Nominations	Nominated	Evicted (Day 92)								
Ola	Not in House															Exempt	Exempt	Not eligible	No; Nominations	Nominated	Nominated	Nominated	No; Nominations	No; Nominations	Mikela, Kelly	Not eligible	Kelly, Rizarta	Nominated	Evicted (Day 92)									
Vserlo	Not in House															Exempt	Exempt	Not eligible	No; Nominations	Nominated	Nominated	Nominated	No; Nominations	Nominated	Kelly, Aldo	Not eligible	Kelly, Aldo	Evicted (Day 88)										
Mikela	Not in House																	Not eligible	No; Nominations	Nominated	No; Nominations	Nominated	No; Nominations	No; Nominations	Rozana, Ola	Evicted (Day 85)												
Shkelzen	Not in House																	Not eligible	No; Nominations	Nominated	No; Nominations	Nominated	No; Nominations	Nominated	Evicted (Day 81)													
Amber	Not eligible	G-Bani, Valbona	No; Nominations	Ols, Rozana	No; Nominations	Livia, Bernard	Walked (Day 25)											Comeback housemate	No; Nominations	Nominated	No; Nominations	Nominated	Nominated	Evicted (Day 78)														
G-Bani	Not eligible	Aldo, Loredana	No; Nominations	Gerta, Ols	No; Nominations	Banned	Nominated	No; Nominations	Banned	Danja	Nominated	Banned	Not eligible	No; Nominations	Ejected (Day 51)			Comeback housemate	No; Nominations	Nominated	Nominated	Walked (Day 74)																
Riki	Not in House																	Not eligible	No; Nominations	Nominated	Evicted (Day 71)																	
Tiri	Not in House									Exempt	No; Nominations	Aldo, Loredana	Not eligible	No; Nominations	Valbona, Indrit	No; Nominations	No; Nominations	Not eligible	Nominated	Evicted (Day 71)																		
Livia	Not eligible	Jozi, Valbona	No; Nominations	Arsida, Gerta	No; Nominations	Jozi, Klajdi	Nominated	No; Nominations	Aldo, Klajdi	Nominated	No; Nominations	Indrit, Loredana	Not eligible	No; Nominations	Indrit, Aldo	Nominated	Nominated	Evicted (Day 64)																				
Krisa	Not in House									Exempt	No; Nominations	Loredana, Valbona	Not eligible	No; Nominations	Aldo, Valbona	Nominated	Evicted (Day 60)	Comeback housemate	Evicted (Day 60)																			
Indrit	Not in House									Exempt	No; Nominations	Tiri, Valbona	Not eligible	No; Nominations	Valbona, Loredana	Evicted (Day 57)																						
Klajdi	Not eligible	Jozi, Zebervoki	Nominated	Bernard, Jozi	No; Nominations	Bernard, Livia	Nominated	No; Nominations	Bernard, Livia	Saved	Nominated	Evicted (Day 43)						Comeback housemate	Evicted (Day 43)																			
Gert	Not in House				Exempt	Bernard, Xum	Nominated	No; Nominations	Bernard, Rozana	Nominated	Evicted (Day 39)							Comeback housemate	Evicted (Day 39)																			
Bernard	Civilians; House	Exempt	Nominated	Jozi, Xum	No; Nominations	Klajdi, Ols	Nominated	No; Nominations	Gert, Klajdi	Evicted (Day 36)																												
Xum	Not eligible	Livia, Valbona	Nominated	Livia, Valbona	No; Nominations	Livia, Valbona	Nominated	Nominated	Evicted (Day 32)																													
Ols	Not eligible	G-Bani, Valbona	Nominated	Arsida, Gramos	No; Nominations	Bernard, Livia	Nominated	Evicted (Day 29)																														
Igli	Not in House				Exempt	Bernard, Valbona	Walked (Day 23)																															
Gramos	Civilians; House	Exempt	No; Nominations	Arsida, Jozi	No; Nominations	Evicted (Day 22)																																
Petro	Not in House		Exempt	Bernard, Gerta	No; Nominations	Evicted (Day 22)																																
Arsida	Civilians; House	Exempt	Nominated	Livia, Ols	Evicted (Day 18)																																	
Zebervoki	Not eligible	Gerta, Valbona	Nominated	Evicted (Day 15)																																		
Briseida & Jori	Civilians; House	Evicted (Civilians House)																																				
Eda	Civilians; House	Evicted (Civilians House)																																				
Ejona	Civilians; House	Evicted (Civilians House)																																				
Gili	Not eligible	Walked (Day 6)																																				
Redon	Not eligible	Walked (Day 6)																Comeback housemate	Walked (Day 6)																			
Notes	1	2, 3	4, 5	5	6, 7	6, 7, 8, 9	10	11	8, 9	12, 13	14	8, 9	15	16	8, 17	18, 19	19, 20	21	22	23	24	25	26	27	8, 28, 29	30	8, 31	32	none	33	8, 34	none	35	none	36, 37	38	39	
Against public vote	Arsida, Bernard, Briseida & Jori, Eda, Ejona, Gramos	G-Bani, Gerta, Jozi, Valbona	Aldo, Arsida, Bernard, Jozi, Klajdi, Laert, Ols, Xum, Zebervoki	Arsida, Gerta, Gramos, Jozi, Livia, Ols, Rozana	Aldo, Amber, Bernard, Danja, Egli, G-Bani, Gerta, Gramos, Jozi, Klajdi, Laert, Livia, Loredana, Ols, Petro, Rozana, Valbona, Xum	Bernard, Gerta, Klajdi, Livia, Valbona, Xum	All housemates	Egli, Xum	Bernard, Gert, Gerta, Jozi, Klajdi	Aldo, Gert, Jozi, Laert, Livia, Loredana, Rozana, Valbona	G-Bani, Gjesti, Klajdi, Rozana	G-Bani, Gerta, Indrit, Loredana, Tiri	Gerta	Aldo, Danja, Egli, G-Bani, Gerta, Gjesti, Indrit, ~~Jozi~~, Krisa, Laert, Livia, Loredana, Rozana, Tiri, Valbona	Aldo, Egli, Gerta, Gjesti, Indrit, Livia, Rozana, Valbona	Danja, Egli, Gerta, Krisa, Livia, Loredana, Rozana, Valbona	Livia, Loredana	Amber, G-Bani, Gert, Jozi, Klajdi, Krisa, Redon	Aldo, Egli, Gerta, Rizarta, Rozana, Tiri	All housemates	Egli, G-Bani, Gjesti, Laert & Valbona, Ola, Rozana, Vserlo	Aldo, Amber, Danja, Egli, Gerta, Jozi, Kelly, Laert & Valbona, Loredana, Mikela, Ola, Rizarta, Rozana, Shkelzen, Vserlo	Amber, Laert & Valbona, Rozana	Aldo, Gjesti, Jozi, Laert & Valbona, Shkelzen, Vserlo	Gerta, Gjesti, Kelly, Laert & Valbona, Mikela, Ola, Vserlo	Egli	Aldo, Gerta, Ola, Rizarta, Vserlo	Danja, Egli, Gjesti, Laert & Valbona, Ola, Rozana	All housemates	Laert, Valbona	Aldo, Gerta, Jozi	All housemates	Gerta, Rozana	Aldo, Danja, Egli, Gjesti, Jozi, Laert, Loredana	Egli, Laert	Danja, Egli, Gerta, Gjesti, Jozi, Loredana	Egli, Gjesti, Laert, Rozana	
Ejected	none												Gerta	Jozi, G-Bani	none																							
Walked	Gili & Redon	none					Amber, Igli	none														G-Bani, Egli	none															
Evicted	Briseida & Jori; Fewest votes to enter	Jozi; Fewest votes to save	Zebervoki; Fewest votes to save	Arsida; Fewest votes to save	Petro; Fewest votes to save	Eviction cancelled	Ols; Fewest votes to save	Xum; Most votes to evict	Bernard; Fewest votes to save	Gert; Most votes to evict	Klajdi; Fewest votes to save	Eviction cancelled	Gerta; Most votes to return	Eviction cancelled	Indrit; Fewest votes to save	Krisa; Fewest votes to save	Livia; Fewest votes to save	Amber; Most votes to return	Tiri; Fewest votes to save	Riki; Fewest votes to save	Eviction cancelled	Eviction cancelled	Amber; Fewest votes to save	Shkelzen; Fewest votes to save	Mikela; Fewest votes to save	Egli; Most votes to return	Vserlo; Fewest votes to save	Ola; Fewest votes to save	Rizarta; Fewest votes to save	Valbona; Fewest votes to save	Aldo; Fewest votes to save	Kelly; Fewest votes to save	Rozana; Most votes to be finalist	Aldo; Fewest votes to save	Laert; Most votes to be finalist	Gjesti, Egli; Most votes to be finalist	Egli; Fewest votes (out of 4)	Laert; Fewest votes (out of 3)
Evicted	Eda; Fewest votes to enter	Jozi; Fewest votes to save	Zebervoki; Fewest votes to save	Arsida; Fewest votes to save	Gramos; Fewest votes to save	Eviction cancelled	Ols; Fewest votes to save	Xum; Most votes to evict	Bernard; Fewest votes to save	Gert; Most votes to evict	Klajdi; Fewest votes to save	Eviction cancelled	Gerta; Most votes to return	Eviction cancelled	Indrit; Fewest votes to save	Krisa; Fewest votes to save	Livia; Fewest votes to save	G-Bani; Most votes to return	Tiri; Fewest votes to save	Riki; Fewest votes to save	Eviction cancelled	Eviction cancelled	Amber; Fewest votes to save	Shkelzen; Fewest votes to save	Mikela; Fewest votes to save	Egli; Most votes to return	Vserlo; Fewest votes to save	Ola; Fewest votes to save	Rizarta; Fewest votes to save	Valbona; Fewest votes to save	Aldo; Fewest votes to save	Kelly; Fewest votes to save	Rozana; Most votes to be finalist	Aldo; Fewest votes to save	Laert; Most votes to be finalist	Danja, Jozi, Loredana, Gerta; Fewest votes to be finalist	Rozana; Fewest votes (out of 2)	Gjesti; Most votes to win
Evicted	Ejona; Fewest votes to enter	Jozi; Fewest votes to save	Zebervoki; Fewest votes to save	Arsida; Fewest votes to save	Gramos; Fewest votes to save	Eviction cancelled	Ols; Fewest votes to save	Xum; Most votes to evict	Bernard; Fewest votes to save	Gert; Most votes to evict	Klajdi; Fewest votes to save	Eviction cancelled	Gerta; Most votes to return	Eviction cancelled	Indrit; Fewest votes to save	Krisa; Fewest votes to save	Livia; Fewest votes to save	Jozi; Most votes to return	Tiri; Fewest votes to save	Riki; Fewest votes to save	Eviction cancelled	Eviction cancelled	Amber; Fewest votes to save	Shkelzen; Fewest votes to save	Mikela; Fewest votes to save	Egli; Most votes to return	Vserlo; Fewest votes to save	Ola; Fewest votes to save	Rizarta; Fewest votes to save	Valbona; Fewest votes to save	Aldo; Fewest votes to save	Kelly; Fewest votes to save	Rozana; Most votes to be finalist	Aldo; Fewest votes to save	Laert; Most votes to be finalist	Danja, Jozi, Loredana, Gerta; Fewest votes to be finalist	Rozana; Fewest votes (out of 2)	Gjesti; Most votes to win

=== Notes ===
- ^Note 1: Arsida, Bernard, Briseida & Jori, Eda, Ejona and Gramos, entered the Civilians House on Day 4, where the public voted to choose two of them to become part of the cast. Arsida and Gramos received the most votes and moved into the main house on Day 8 with the remaining housemates. Rozana had the power to take one civilian on the Big Brother VIP house. She chose Bernard.
- ^Note 2: Arsida, Bernard and Gramos, as the new housemates had immunity.
- ^Note 3: Jozi was evicted by the public votes, but Valbona broke the Emergency Kit Glass, which was the "One Way Ticket/Round Trip Ticket" for Jozi and he returned on the game.
- ^Note 4: The housemates were divided into two groups. Both groups had a leader, Ols and Rozana were the leaders. Ols choose for his team: Aldo, Arsida, Bernard, Jozi, Klajdi, Laert, Xum and Zebervoki. Rozana choose for her team: Amber, Egli, G-Bani, Gerta, Gramos, Livia, Loredana and Valbona. The viewers voted for the two teams. The team with Ols, as the leader, had the fewest votes and then his team were against the public vote and the housemate with the fewest votes was eliminated from the house.
- ^Note 5: Danja and Petro, as the new housemates had immunity.
- ^Note 6: Gert, Gjesti and Igli, as the new housemates had immunity.
- ^Note 7: The viewers voted for their favorite housemate. The two housemates with the fewest votes, were eliminated and the housemates with the most votes had immunity. Gramos and Petro had the fewest votes and Amber and Rozana had the most votes.
- ^Note 8: After Aldo has broken the Emergency Kit Glass, and will meet his daughter, he had the power to nominate one housemate and that whoever he chose would automatically face every eviction of the season until they were evicted. Aldo chose to nominate Gerta, meaning she also could not be nominated by her fellow housemates in following weeks.
- ^Note 9: On Day 22, as punishment for breaking the rules, G-Bani was banned from nominating.
- ^Note 10: On Day 25, Amber, G-Bani and Jozi were automatically nominated due to breaking the rules, but the eviction was cancelled, because Amber left the game. Then Big Brother decided to send all the housemates against the public votes and on day 29 one housemate will be evicted from the house.
- ^Note 11: On Day 29, Egli was being tempted by the Pandora's Box, and she choose to open the box. The good consequence was: won two free trip tickets by Globus travel to Turkey, while the bad consequence was: Egli had the power to send 2 housemates against the public votes. She could also choose herself. Egli choose Xum and herself.
- ^Note 12: Indrit, Krisa and Tiri, as the new housemates had immunity.
- ^Note 13: On Day 36, the viewers voted for their favorite housemate. The three housemates with the most votes were G-Bani, Gerta and Gjesti, who all three received immunity and had the power to give to three other housemates also immunity. G-Bani choose Danja, Gerta choose Klajdi and Gjesti choose Egli. All other housemates were nominated for eviction.
- ^Note 14: G-Bani, Gjesti, Klajdi and Rozana were automatically nominated due to breaking the rules.
- ^Note 15: On Day 46, Gerta was ejected from the house, but the viewers voted for her to either eject her or let her return into the house. She received the most votes and returned to the house.
- ^Note 16: On Day 46, were opened the lines for one week and the viewers voted for their favorite housemate. The housemate with the fewest votes, was eliminated. After the ejection of Jozi on Day 47 the viewers continued to vote, until on Day 51 where the eviction was cancelled, after the ejection of G-Bani.
- ^Note 17: Laert as Head of Household, had the power to send two more housemates to face the public vote, he chose Gjesti and Rozana.
- ^Note 18: Krisa as Head of Household, had the power to send either all the Men or all the Women to face the public vote, she chose the Women.
- ^Note 19: Kelly, Ola, Rizarta and Vserlo, as the new housemates had immunity.
- ^Note 20: On Day 60, a new nomination method was followed, where the opinionists played the main role. The housemates were divided into two groups and each of the opinionists chose the most at-risk housemate, who were nominated for eviction. The red group were Aldo, Danja, Gerta and Loredana. The blue group were Egli, Gjesti, Laert, Livia, Rozana, Tiri and Valbona. Arbër Hajdari chose Loredana and Neda Balluku chose Livia.
- ^Note 21: On Day 64, Gjesti as Head of Household, had the power to put 7 evicted housemates in the race, of which 3 will be able to return into the game again through a televote. The 7 evicted housemates that Gjesti chose were: Klajdi, Krisa, Redon, Gert, Amber, G-Bani and Jozi.
- ^Note 22: Egli's disruption of the ropes game consequently, Aldo, Egli, Gerta, Rizarta, Rozana and Tiri, as losers of the ropes game, were nominated and the housemate with the fewest votes would be eliminated.
- ^Note 23: A televoting was opened within the show, where all the housemates were nominated due to breaking the rules.
- ^Note 24: 7 Housemates went to the televote after opening the black envelope at home, for hiding personal belongings.
- ^Note 25: Rizarta as Head of Household, had the power to choose three housemates to give them immunity. She chose herself, Kelly and Mikela, thus leading all the remaining housemates to the nomination. Meanwhile, after this announcement Gjesti broke the Emergency Kit Glass, for immunity. The envelope said "you can choose to exchange yourself with three housemates". But like every good thing that has a bad thing, with Gjesti's exit from the nomination, all the housemates went to televoting.
- ^Note 26: On Day 78, Gerta was being tempted by the Pandora's Box, and she choose to open the box. Gerta had the power to nominate 3 housemates, without including herself. Gerta's choice was to nominate Rozana, Laert & Valbona and Amber.
- ^Note 27: On Day 78, a new nomination method was followed. All the boys were nominated, except for two boys, who were able to save, by the girls in two groups. Rozana, Gerta, Danja and Rizarta saved Kelly, while Valbona, Ola, Loredana and Mikela did not unanimously agree on a name and could not save any of the boys. Valbona also goes to the nomination since, she and Laert are a single player.
- ^Note 28: Gjesti was automatically nominated due to breaking the rules.
- ^Note 29: In a lifeline to choose the Head of Household of the week, where the last one in the chain was Gerta, who is automatically chosen as the Head of Household of the week had the power to send a housemate to the nomination, she chose Laert & Valbona.
- ^Note 30: By majority vote, the public decided to return Egli to the house. It was Egli's request to continue competing for the grand prize, so she was re-entered the house, 9 days after she left, due to her deteriorating health and psychological condition.
- ^Note 31: Egli has immunity after re-entry on Day 85.
- ^Note 32: Divided into three groups, the housemates have decided on the names that will go to the nomination. Each group had 30 seconds to choose one by majority vote to take to the televoting. The first group decided on Laert & Valbona, the second group on Ola, while the third group did not agree on a majority vote, going to the televoting fourth, namely Danja, Egli, Gjesti and Rozana.
- ^Note 33: Laert and Valbona were faced with a choice if they decided to split up as two different contestants. If one of them chose to split up, then they would both go head-to-head in a nomination and one of them would leave the house. Valbona did not accept this "offer", deciding to be a single contestant with Laert. On the other hand, Laert accepted the challenge to split up from Valbona, so they both went to the nomination.
- ^Note 34: Aldo was evicted by the public, but he was revealed to have picked the Return Ticket, therefore he went back into the House.
- ^Note 35: Two housemates will face each other for the first finalist. Divided according to the sofas they sit on, the housemates had to choose a representative from the sofa opposite them to go to the nomination. The red sofa chose Rozana, while the blue sofa chose Gerta. One of them will go to the final automatically, while the other will learn her fate on day 106.
- ^Note 36: The first finalist, Rozana, was given the opportunity by 'Big Brother' to choose the names of two housemates who would face each other to become the second finalist. She chose Egli and Laert.
- ^Note 37: Gerta, after facing Rozana for the first finalist, cannot face 'Big Brother's' other challenges head-to-head for the final, she can only go to the final if she is chosen from a standard televoting.
- ^Note 38: Only 2 housemates out of the last 6 will be able to reach the Final, the other 4 will be eliminated on day 113.
- ^Note 39: At the final round, the public voted for the winner.
