= Luiz Ejlli =

Albanian singer

- Born: 12 July 1985 (age 41); Shkodër, PSR Albania
- Occupations: Artist, Singer, Musician, TV Personality, Reality Show Actor
- Years active: 2004–present
- Spouse: Kiara Tito (m. 2023)
- Children: Luna Mari Ejlli

Luiz Ejlli (born 12 July 1985) is an Albanian singer, songwriter, actor, musician, former diplomat, reality show star and TV personality. A former winner of the 44th edition of Festivali i Këngës, he also represented Albania in the Eurovision Song Contest 2006. After several years of absence on music, he gained popularity and received significant attention following his participation and victory of the second season of the Albanian reality competition Big Brother VIP on Top Channel. In 2010, Ejlli was appointed by the Albanian Government as First Secretary for Culture, Tourism, and Arts in the Albanian Embassy in Paris, France.

== Life and career ==
Ejlli was born on 12 July 1985, in Shkodër, Albania. Between 1991 and 2002, he attended the Prenk Jakova Musical secondary school in Shkodër. He debuted in an Albanian version of Idol in Tirana called "Ethet e së premtes mbrëma". After his victory, he participated in the 43rd edition of Festivali i Këngës. He ended in second place with the song "Hëna dhe Yjet Dashurojnë". Ejlli participated in the music competition again in 2005 and won with the song "Zjarr e ftohtë", with which he represented Albania at the Eurovision Song Contest 2006, but failed to make it past the semi-final stage.

In November 2010, Ejlli collaborated with Juliana Pasha on "Sa e shite zemrën", with which they competed in the annual musical competition Kënga Magjike, winning the prize of the critic and the first place award. Ejlli was also employed from the Albanian state authorities of the Ministry of Foreign Affairs as a high-profile cultural attaché at the Albanian embassy in Paris.

On 24 December 2022, Ejlli appeared as a contestant on the second season of the reality competition Big Brother VIP, an Albanian edition of Celebrity Big Brother. During his participation on the competition, he recorded the song "Me ty" which was dedicated to Albanian television presenter Kiara Tito, who was also a participant of the competition, and released on 14 February 2023, which was also Valentine's Day. On 6 May 2023, in the season finale, Ejlli emerged as the winner of the second season. On the same night, Ejlli also married Tito.

Following his participation and victory of the second season of Big Brother VIP, Ejlli played Besi in the 2023 romantic comedy film Within Love.

Awards and achievements
Preceded by Ledina Çelo with "Nesër shkoj"	Festivali i Këngës; Winner; 2005	Succeeded by Frederik and Aida Ndoci with "Balada e gurit"
Preceded by Ledina Çelo with "Tomorrow I Go"	Albania in the Eurovision Song Contest; 2006	Succeeded by Frederik Ndoci with "Hear My Plea"
