= Laert Vasili =

Albanian actor and director (born 1974)

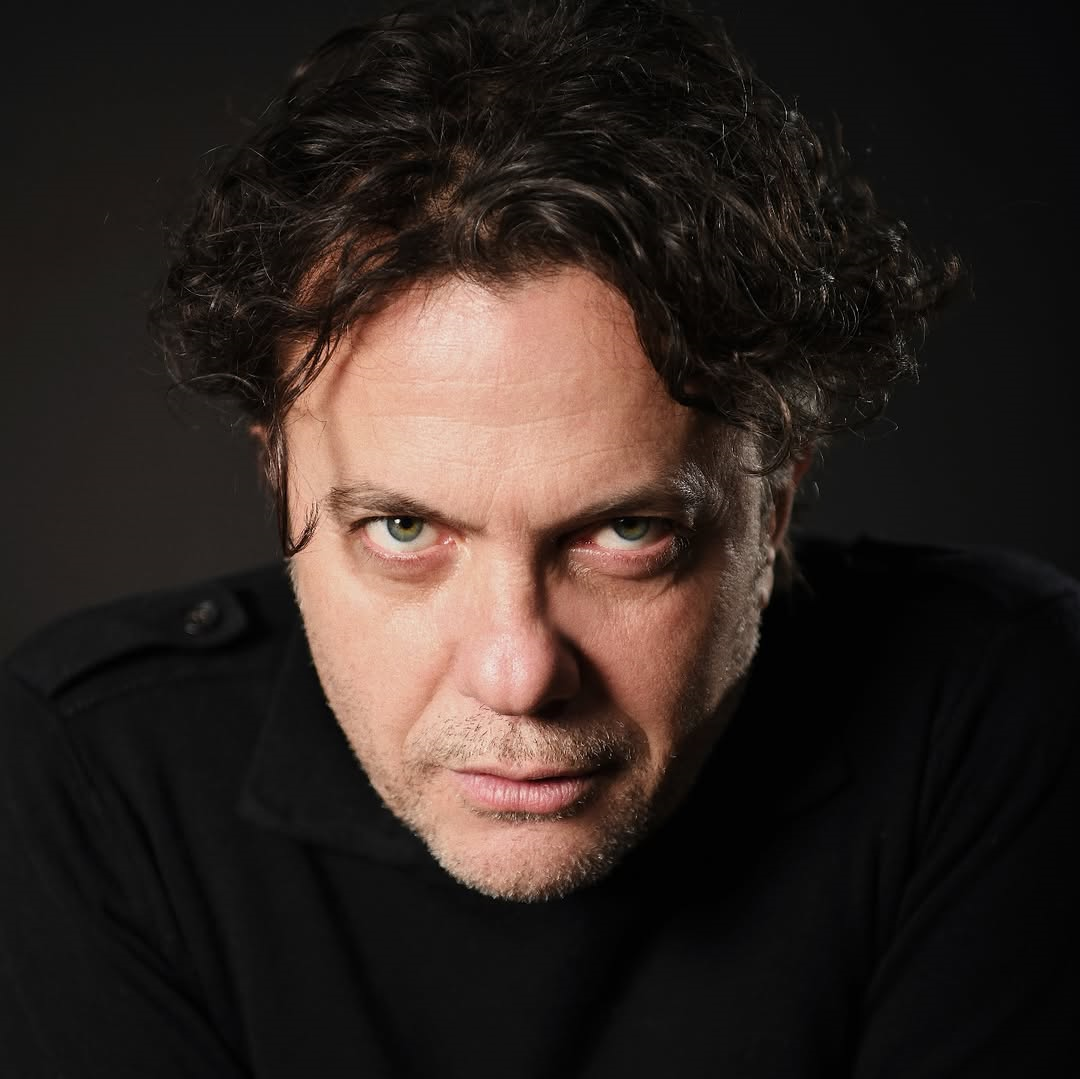
- Born: March 7, 1974 (age 52); Delvinë, PR Albania
- Citizenship: Albanian; Greek
- Education: Academy of Arts in Tirana; National Theatre of Greece
- Occupations: Actor; Director
- Years active: 1989–present
- Honors: Citizen of Honour of Delvinë (Qyetar Nderi i Delvinës) Citizen of Honour of Leskovik (Qyetar Nderi i Leskovikut)

Laert Vasili (Albanian: [laˈɛɾt vaˈsili], Greek: Λαέρτης Βασιλείου, Laertis Vasiliou; born March 7, 1974) is an Albanian actor, film and theatre director and political commentator, known for his roles in theater and cinema. Vasili has often been part of public debates, among the key voices of civil society for the rights of Albanians in Greece.

== Early life and education ==
Vasili is of Albanian ethnicity on his father's side, while his mother is of Greek ethnic background. Both of his parents were officers in the Military of Albania. As a result, the family moved around a lot and he spent his childhood between Tirana, Saranda and Delvina, Albania. He started acting at the age of 16 while still in high school, playing leading parts in several school theatre performances. At the age of 19 he was accepted to the Academy of Arts in Tirana. In 1994 he left to Greece to study acting at the National Theatre of Greece Drama School in Athens, Greece. He came second out of 750 applicants. He graduated in 1997.

== Career ==
He was nominated for the Dimitris Horn Prize for "Best Young Actor" in 2001.

In 2012 Vasili directed a play in Greece, Corpus Christi, depicting Jesus Christ and his apostles as a group of homosexual men. The 1997 play was written by American playwright Terrence McNally. The Greek Orthodox Church and the right-wing extremist Golden Dawn protested against the play, and Vasili and the cast of the play faced charges of blasphemy in Greece. Vasiliou criticised the fact that prosecutors were using scarce resources to prosecute his cast, rather than investigating tax evaders who had contributed to Greece's economic crisis. "What I see is that there are people who have robbed the country blind, who are not in jail, and the prosecutor turns against art," Vasili told Reuters.

Vasili was part of the first season of the reality show Dance with Me on Klan TV in Tirana, held between 28 September and 29 December 2014. Vasili and the professional singer Zajmina Vasjari came second of six competing couples at the finale. He also won the first season of the reality show Blind Taste on Vizion Plus TV in Tirana, Albania. He came first at the grand finale on 4 July 2015 ahead of 32 candidates. Recently, he has also been seen as a panelist on the show 360 Gradë me Artur Zhejin, serving as a commentator. In December 2024, he became a housemate on the television reality show Big Brother Vip Albania 4. He made it to the finale as one of the four finalists, finishing in third place.

== Awards and honors ==
- Best Director Award at International Theatre Festival in Prespa 2021
- Actor of Europe Award at International Theatre Festival Lake Without Borders 2018
- Best Director of the Year at Pegasi International Awards 2015
- Special Award for Corpus Christi at Athens Queer Theatre Award 2012
- Most Important Theatre Artist of the Year 2008 by Eleftherotypia
- Mess Future Prize at Mess Sarajevo International Theatre Festival 2008
- Best Director Prize at Balkan Theatre Festival 2005
- Citizen of Honour of Delvine (Qytetar Nderi i Delvinës)
- Citizen of Honour of Leskovik (Qytetar Nderi i Leskovikut). The award was conferred live on the final night of Big Brother VIP Albania 4 by the Mayor of Kolonjë, Erion Isai.

== Nominations ==
- Best Director Prize 2016] by Kult Awards
- Man of the Year 2012 by LIFO
- Best Director Prize 2008 by Athinorama People's Choice Theatre Awards
- Best Young Actor Prize 2002

== Director ==
He has written and directed theatrical plays dealing with the sensitive theme of immigration and the notion of being a foreigner. He was the first to use Albanian artists living in Greece in professional performances, which moreover were multi-lingual. The plays were initially presented in Athens, Greece, and run for more than 400 performances from 2003 to 2015, in Greece, Cyprus, Bosnia and Herzegovina, North Macedonia, Kosovo and in Albania.

- Electra by Sophocles at Buthrotum
- L'Affaire de la rue de Lourcine, by Eugène Marin Labiche
- Doruntine, by Ismail Kadare
- Agamemnon Inferno, by Ismail Kadare
- Corpus Christi by Terrence McNally
- The Emigrants by Sławomir Mrożek
- Love songs with ravens by Bashkim Hoxha
- I remember… by Ylli Demneri
- One out of ten by Laert Vasili at MESS
- Project Ilion-Work in Progress by Laert Vasili

== Translator ==
He has translated several plays from English into Greek and Albanian, and also from Greek into Albanian.

== Filmography ==
- The Miracle of the Sargasso Sea
- The Invocation of Enver Simaku
- Menge Kemishe
- Paftuar
- Ειμαρμένη
- Agon
- Out of touch
- Balkan Bazaar
- Red Sky
- Charlie's Son
- Hostage
- Playing Parts
- Alexandreia
- Tomorrow Is Another Day
- Annas Somer
- Edge of Night
- See You
- Flegomeni Stella

== Television ==
- Skanderbeg
- Oikos antohis
- Oi istories tou astynomou Beka
- I agapi irthe apo makria
- Gia tin Anna
- Ta mystika tis Edem
- Kato Partali
- Three at TIFF
- Αγνώστου Διαμονής
- Ω Γλυκύ μου Έαρ
- Στον Ήλιο του Αιγαίου
- Η λίμνη των στεναγμών
- Αίθουσα Αναμονής
- Αγία τετράδα
- Ελληνοαλβανικό Συναξάρι
- Tingulli i Heshtjes
- Dance with me Albania
- 360 gradë nga Artur Zheji
- Big Brother VIP Albania 4
