= G-Bani =

Albanian singer and lyricist (born 1981)

- Birth name: Arban Përlala
- Also known as: G-Bani, Bani G
- Born: July 7, 1981 (age 44) Pukë, PSR Albania
- Genres: Rap
- Occupation(s): Rapper, lyricist, actor
- Years active: 2000s–present

Arban Përlala (born 7 July 1981), better known by his stage name G-Bani (also known as Bani G), is an Albanian-born singer, rapper, lyricist and actor. He is known for his contributions to the rap scene and for his roles in television and film. G-Bani holds Albanian, Swedish, and British nationalities.

In 2024, G-Bani joined the cast of the reality television show Big Brother VIP Albania 4 (season 4) as a housemate.

== Discography ==
- Midis meje dhe vet’vetes (2005)
- Të dua ft Crazy Girl (2008)
- Punë të pastra (2008)
- De e bra (2015)
- S'po ma nin ft Tiri (2025)

== Filmography ==
- Δέκα Λεπτά Κήρυγμα (2001–2003, MEGA Channel)
- Mikres Oduseies (2006)
- Out of Touch (2011)
