= Kiara Tito =

Albanian television presenter (born 1996)

- Born: 18 January 1996 (age 30); Lushnjë, Albania
- Education: Marin Barleti University
- Occupations: Television presenter; Model
- Employer: Top Channel
- Television: Top Select; Portokalli
- Spouse: Luiz Ejlli (m. 2023)
- Children: Luna Mari Ejlli

Kiara Tito (born 18 January 1996) is an Albanian television presenter, actress and former model, best known as the co-host of the Albanian sketch comedy and variety show Portokalli on Top Channel.

== Biography ==
=== Early life and education ===
Kiara Tito was born on 18 January 1996, in Lushnjë, Albania. She was raised in Italy and later returned to Albania to live in Tirana. At age 13, she began participating in modeling and beauty contests, winning the title of "Miss Intelligence." Tito graduated from Barleti University in Tirana with a degree in political science.

== Career ==
In 2015, Tito was selected from among 200 candidates by public vote to present the show Top Select on Top Channel. Following this, she appeared in various music videos and hosted different events. In 2018, she competed alongside environmentalist Sazan Guri in the fifth season of the dance competition Dance With Me Albania on TV Klan. She also hosted the plastic surgery-themed program Doktor Plastik on ABC News Albania. In 2020, she presented the show Style Star on ABC for two seasons.

In 2022, Tito participated in the second season of the reality show Big Brother VIP Albania, where she met singer Luiz Ejlli. Over time, they developed a close personal relationship that was publicly acknowledged on day 39, when Tito confirmed their romantic involvement. She was eliminated on day 92, temporarily separating from Ejlli. But after a week she re-entered on the house to get re-eliminated on day 120. On the finale night of Big Brother VIP Albania 2 on 6 May 2023, Tito and Ejlli officially married in a public ceremony at the Tirana Municipality, attended by their families and participants of the season. Following the ceremony, Luiz Ejlli won the second season of the show.

Two months after BB VIP 2, Tito returned to television presenting, strengthening her presence on Top Channel. In 2023, she hosted the show Kepi i VIP-ave, followed by Fan Club DWTS during episodes of Dancing With The Stars.

Through the song "Frymë" by Luiz Ejlli, she announced the birth of their first child, Luna Mari Ejlli, born on 30 April 2024.

In October 2024, Tito was assigned as one of the presenters of the comedy show Portokalli, alongside Nevina Shtylla and Salsano Rrapi. She also joined the show's cast as an actress in several episodes.
