= Big Brother VIP (Albanian TV series) season 2 =

Big Brother VIP
- Season 2
- Season 2 logo
- Hosted by: Arbana Osmani
- No. of days: 134
- No. of housemates: 37
- Winner: Luiz Ejlli
- Runner-up: Krist Aliaj Dragot
- Companion shows: Big Brother VIP – Fans' Club; Big Brother Radio; Post Big Brother VIP
- No. of episodes: 148

Release
- Original network: Top Channel
- Original release: 24 December 2022 – 6 May 2023

Season chronology
- ← Previous; Season 1 Next → Season 3

Big Brother VIP 2, was the second season of Big Brother VIP, hosted by Arbana Osmani. The season started airing on 24 December 2022 on Top Channel, and ended after 134 days on 6 May 2023. The whole season, live from the house, the viewers viewed in two live pay-per-view channels, with the name Big Brother VIP 1 and Big Brother VIP 2, which were available on Albanian television platform DigitAlb. Arbër Hajdari returned as opinionist in the live evictions shows and was joined by Zhaklin Lekatari, replacing Balina Bodinaku.

Megi Pojani hosted the spin-off show Big Brother VIP – Fans' Club, replacing Dojna Mema. Ardit Cuni was the new opinionist for the spin-off show Fans' Club. A 60-minute radio show Big Brother Radio was introduced this season, with Elona Duro as the host. Like in the first season, one week after the final of the show, was broadcast a reunion show, with the name Post Big Brother VIP. This season the show was broadcast only for two episodes and the two episodes were broadcast on 13 May 2023 and 20 May 2023. The show was hosted by Arbana Osmani, and the two opinionists were Arbër Hajdari and Zhaklin Lekatari.

The show was originally scheduled to last 100 days, with the finale on 1 April 2023. However, due to satisfactory ratings, the show was extended by over one month, with 134 days.

On 6 May 2023, Luiz Ejlli was announced as the winner of the season, with Krist Aliaj Dragot as the runner-up.

== Production ==
Due to satisfactory ratings of the first season, it was announced a second season of Big Brother VIP, by the executive producers, Lori Hoxha and Sara Hoxha. On 22 February 2022, on the show of Top Channel Ftese ne 5, Arbana Osmani, the presenter of the show said: "Big Brother 2 will come in the end of December" and Lori Hoxha, the producer of the show was asked from the journalist: "Are you ready for the second season?" and then Hoxha said: "Of course."

On 26 June 2022, Lori Hoxha was asked by her followers on the social media Instagram, when will begin Big Brother Vip 2. Hoxha answered "At the end of December, directly after the end of the 2022 FIFA World Cup, that will occupy the screen throughout November and most of December and will have the dedicated space on Top Channel as always [...] But until then, the daily and prime programming will be "on top", so you won't feel the lack too much."

It was reported, that Arbana Osmani, will not be the host of the second season and it was reported that the host, of Për'puthen and Dancing with the Stars, Bora Zemani would be hosting the second season of Big Brother VIP, but in October 2022, the official page of Top Channel on Instagram has published a video with the most spicy moments of the first season, as well as the extraordinary success of the reality show, introducing the name of the moderator: "The program that broke every viewership record, the program that captivated Albanians everywhere, to the point of obsession... Big Brother Vip, with Arbana Osmani, soon on Top Channel". Also on 6 November 2022, Osmani on her interview on the sunday show of Top Channel E Diell said: "I have told the public that I will be in Big Brother VIP. We have had things clear and it is not that I am influenced by what has been written."

On 16 December 2022, Top Channel announced that the season would begin on 24 December 2022.

Like in the previous season, the location for the season will be again in the big studio in Tirana with the name Studio Nova, but with changes. The housemates live together in the house, where 24 hours a day their every word and every action is recorded by cameras and microphones in all the rooms in the house.

== Housemates ==
On Day 1, fifteen housemates entered the house during launch. On Day 11, Efi Dhedhes & Mikela Pupa, who played as one housemate, from now on they both play alone as two individual housemates.

Celebrity	Age on entry	Notability	Day entered	Day exited	Status
Luiz Ejlli	37	Singer	1	134	Winner
Krist Aliaj Dragot	32	Visual Artist & Reality TV Star	1	74	Runner-up
Krist Aliaj Dragot	32	Visual Artist & Reality TV Star	74	134	Runner-up
Ifigjenia "Efi" Dhedhes	26	Reality TV Star	1	43	3rd Place
Ifigjenia "Efi" Dhedhes	26	Reality TV Star	99	134	3rd Place
Dea Mishel Hoxha	27	Actress & TV host	1	134	4th Place
Nita Latifi	30	Singer & Journalist	18	127	Evicted
Qetsor Ferunaj	47	Reality TV Star	71	127	Evicted
Jori Delli	28	Model	71	123	Evicted
Bledi Mane	50	Journalist	46	60	Evicted
Bledi Mane	50	Journalist	99	120	Evicted
Kiara Tito	27	TV Host	1	92	Evicted
Kiara Tito	27	TV Host	99	120	Evicted
Elvis Pupa	45	Comedian	71	116	Evicted
Keisi Medini	22	Singer & Model	46	113	Evicted
Ronaldo Sharka	24	TV Host & Journalist	1	29	Evicted
Ronaldo Sharka	24	TV Host & Journalist	99	109	Evicted
Lorenc Hasrama	25	Singer	81	106	Walked
Gerti Koxha	25	Dentist & Model	81	106	Evicted
Fotini Derxho	30	Reality TV Star	71	102	Evicted
Antoneta Koçi	28	Reality TV Star	71	99	Evicted
Olta Gixhari	36	Actress	1	99	Walked
Armaldo Kllogjeri	47	Tenor	1	85	Evicted
Sabian Medini	50	Singer	71	81	Evicted
Shpat Kerleshi	32	Journalist & Basketball Player	64	78	Evicted
Tan Brahimi	35	Comedian	46	71	Walked
Eva Alikaj	63	Actress	60	68	Ejected
Ermiona Lekbello	44	Singer	50	68	Ejected
Pirro Beati	30	Photographer	50	64	Evicted
Valbona Mema	50	Singer	29	61	Walked
Diola Dosti	35	Nutritionist	18	57	Evicted
Tea Trifoni	23	Reality TV Star	1	50	Evicted
Amos Zaharia	35	Actor	1	46	Evicted
Xhonatan Islami	26	Professional paraglider	29	36	Evicted
Xhonatan Islami	26	Professional paraglider	36	43	Evicted
Bjordi Mezini	34	Reality TV Star & Director	18	39	Evicted
Eni Tare	29	Model	18	32	Evicted
Kejvina Kthella	27	Model	1	25	Ejected
Mikela Pupa	27	Reality TV Star	1	22	Evicted
Gent Hazizi	50	Actor	1	18	Evicted
Herion Mustafaraj	54	Actor & director	1	15	Evicted
Ariana "Ari Blue" Plakiqi	28	Singer	1	11	Evicted
Zhaklina Gjolla	28	TV host & journalist	1	9	Walked

== Nominations table ==
2-in-1 housemate called 'Efi & Mikela', their nominations counted as one. (Week 1)

	Week 1	Week 2	Week 3		Week 4	Week 5		Week 6		Week 7			Week 8	Week 9		Week 10		Week 11		Week 12		Week 13	Week 14	Week 15			Week 16		Week 17			Week 18			Week 20 Final	
	Week 1	Week 2	Day 15	Day 18	Week 4	Day 29	Day 32	Day 36	Day 39	Day 43		Day 46	Week 8	Day 57	Day 60	Day 64	Day 67	Day 71	Day 74	Day 78	Day 81	Week 13	Week 14	Wildcard	Day 99	Day 102	Day 106	Day 109	Day 113	Day 116	Day 119	Day 120	Day 123		Week 20 Final	
Viewers’ Favorite	Zhaklina	none										Armaldo, Luiz	Luiz, Olta	none			Dea Mishel, Kiara, Luiz, Olta	none											Efi, Luiz	none						
Luiz	Efi & Mikela, Ronaldo	Nominated	Dea Mishel, Olta	Nominated	Olta, Ronaldo	In Baby; Room	Diola, Krist	Bjordi, Tea	Diola, Xhonatan	Nominated	Nominated	Exempt	Not eligible	Nominated	Tan	Nominated	Armaldo	Exempt	Nominated	Antoneta, Qetsor	Nominated	No; Nominations	Exempt	Not eligible	Nominated	Efi, Nita	No; Nominations	Dea Mishel, Krist	Bledi, Nita	Kiara, Krist	Bledi, Efi	Exempt	Exempt	Exempt	Winner (Day 134)	
Krist	Ariana, Efi & Mikela	Nominated	Efi, Olta	No; Nominations	Efi, Luiz	Nominated	Efi, Kiara	Armaldo, Efi	Efi, Xhonatan	Not eligible	Exempt	Not eligible	Not eligible	Not eligible	Nominated	No; Nominations	Nita	Nominated	Dea Mishel	Fotini, Qetsor	Nominated	No; Nominations	Exempt	Not eligible	Nominated	Efi, Qetsor	No; Nominations	Efi, Kiara	Elvis, Qetsor	Dea Mishel, Jori	Efi, Qetsor	Nominated	Nominated	Nominated	Runner-up (Day 134)	
Efi	Ariana, Ronaldo	Nominated	Armaldo, Krist	No; Nominations	Krist, Luiz	In Baby; Room	Diola, Tea	Dea Mishel, Tea	Armaldo, Xhonatan	Nominated	Evicted (Day 43)													Comeback housemate	Exempt	Kiara, Lorenc	Nominated	Dea Mishel, Luiz	Bledi, Kiara	Krist, Luiz	Bledi, Kiara	Exempt	Exempt	Exempt	Third place (Day 134)	
Dea Mishel	Armaldo, Ariana	Nominated	Armaldo, Krist	Nominated	Kiara, Luiz	Amos	Diola, Efi	Armaldo, Efi	Efi, Luiz	Exempt	Nominated	Nominated	Diola, ^{(x2)} Nita ^{(x2)}	Not eligible	Nominated	Nominated	Ermiona	Exempt	Armaldo	Fotini, Nita	No; Nominations	No; Nominations	Exempt	Not eligible	Head of Household	Efi, Kiara	No; Nominations	Efi, Kiara	Kiara, Qetsor	Krist, Nita	Efi, Kiara	Nominated	Nominated	Exempt	Fourth place (Day 134)	
Nita	Not in House			Exempt	Kejvina, Luiz	Bjordi	Armaldo, Luiz	Not eligible	Efi, Luiz	Not eligible	Nominated	Not eligible	Armaldo, ^{(x2)} Krist ^{(x2)}	Not eligible	Beati	No; Nominations	Armaldo	Not eligible	Fotini	Antoneta, Dea Mishel	No; Nominations	No; Nominations	Gerti	Not eligible	Nominated	Keisi, Qetsor	Head of Household	Efi, Kiara	Kiara, Qetsor	Bledi, Dea Mishel	Jori, Qetsor	Nominated	Nominated	Nominated	Evicted (Day 127)	
Qetsor	Not in House																	Exempt	Sabian	Dea Mishel, Sabian	No; Nominations	No; Nominations	Nominated	Not eligible	Nominated	Efi, Lorenc	No; Nominations	Krist, Luiz	Kiara, Krist	Kiara, Nita	Bledi, Efi	Nominated	Nominated	Nominated	Evicted (Day 127)	
Jori	Not in House																	Exempt	Qetsor	Krist, Nita	No; Nominations	No; Nominations	Fotini	Not eligible	Exempt	Efi, Lorenc	No; Nominations	Efi, Krist	Bledi, Krist	Dea Mishel, Luiz	Efi, Krist	Nominated	Evicted (Day 123)			
Bledi	Not in House												Dea Mishel, Krist	Nominated	Walked (Day 60)									Comeback housemate	Exempt	Kiara, Qetsor	Nominated	Efi, Kiara	Kiara, Qetsor	Dea Mishel, Luiz	Efi, Kiara	Evicted (Day 120)				
Kiara	Gent, Herion	Nominated	Armaldo, Gent	Nominated	Amos, Krist	Diola	Krist, Tea	Bjordi, Tea	Tea, Xhonatan	Nominated	Nominated	Exempt	Diola, ^{(x2)} Nita ^{(x2)}	Nominated	Luiz	Nominated	Tan	Not eligible	Keisi	Olta, Qetsor	No; Nominations	Nominated	Evicted (Day 92)	Comeback housemate	Exempt	Jori, Nita	Nominated	Bledi, Nita	Bledi, Krist	Efi, Luiz	Bledi, Nita	Re-Evicted (Day 120)				
Elvis	Not in House																		Nominated	Luiz, Olta	No; Nominations	No; Nominations	Saved	Not eligible	Nominated	Efi, Ronaldo	No; Nominations	Dea Mishel, Krist	Bledi, ^{(x2)} Krist ^{(x2)}	Evicted (Day 116)						
Keisi	Not in House											Exempt	Armaldo, ^{(x2)} Krist ^{(x2)}	Not eligible	Saved	No; Nominations	Armaldo	Not eligible	Krist	Armaldo, Fotini	No; Nominations	Head of Household	Nominated	Not eligible	Nominated	Efi, Gerti	No; Nominations	Bledi, Qetsor	Evicted (Day 113)							
Ronaldo	Armaldo, Gent	Nominated	Armaldo, Krist	No; Nominations	Armaldo, Krist	Evicted (Day 29)																		Comeback housemate	Exempt	Gerti, Lorenc	Nominated	Re-Evicted (Day 109)								
Lorenc	Not in House																					Exempt	Exempt	Not eligible	Nominated	Efi, Gerti	Walked (Day 106)									
Gerti	Not in House																					No; Nominations	Elvis	Not eligible	Nominated	Keisi, Qetsor	Evicted (Day 106)									
Fotini	Not in House																	Exempt	Jori	Armaldo, Sabian	No; Nominations	No; Nominations	Nita	Not eligible	Nominated	Evicted (Day 102)										
Antoneta	Not in House																	Exempt	Nominated	Armaldo, Nita	No; Nominations	No; Nominations	Nominated	Evicted (Day 99)												
Olta	Ariana, Efi & Mikela	Nominated	Gent, Luiz	No; Nominations	Efi, Luiz	Nominated	Efi, Luiz	Efi, Tea	Efi, Luiz	Not eligible	Nominated	Nominated	Not eligible	Not eligible	Nominated	Nominated	Ermiona	Nominated	Nita	Dea Mishel, Luiz	No; Nominations	Nominated	Exempt	Walked (Day 99)												
Armaldo	Efi & Mikela, Ariana	Nominated	Mikela, Ronaldo	No; Nominations	Luiz, Ronaldo	Kiara	Diola, Tea	Bjordi, Dea Mishel	Diola, Xhonatan	Not eligible	Nominated	Exempt	Not eligible	Not eligible	Nominated	No; Nominations	Ermiona	Nominated	Olta	Antoneta, Sabian	Nominated	Evicted (Day 85)														
Sabian	Not in House																	Exempt	Saved	Armaldo, Fotini	Evicted (Day 81)															
Shpat	Not in House																Keisi	Exempt	Nominated	Evicted (Day 78)				Comeback housemate	Evicted (Day 78)											
Tan	Not in House											Exempt	Armaldo, Krist	Not eligible	Ermiona	No; Nominations	Nita	Walked (Day 71)																		
Eva	Not in House															Exempt	Keisi	Ejected (Day 68)																		
Ermiona	Not in House												Armaldo, Dea Mishel	Not eligible	Nita	No; Nominations	Nita	Ejected (Day 68)																		
Beati	Not in House												Armaldo, Krist	Not eligible	Keisi	Nominated	Evicted (Day 64)																			
Valbona	Not in House						Armaldo, Krist	Not eligible	Tea, Xhonatan	Not eligible	Nominated	Not eligible	Dea Mishel, ^{(x2)} Krist ^{(x2)}	Not eligible	Kiara	Walked (Day 61)								Comeback housemate	Walked (Day 61)											
Diola	Not in House			Exempt	Efi, Tea	Nita	Armaldo, Luiz	Not eligible	Armaldo, Luiz	Not eligible	Nominated	Not eligible	Armaldo, Krist	Evicted (Day 57)																						
Tea	Armaldo, Herion	Nominated	Gent, Olta	No; Nominations	Luiz, Olta	Nominated	Efi, Luiz	Efi, Luiz	Efi, Luiz	Not eligible	Nominated	Nominated	Evicted (Day 50)																							
Amos	Armaldo, Efi & Mikela	Nominated	Armaldo, Gent	No; Nominations	Kiara, Tea	Saved	Armaldo, Luiz	Armaldo, Luiz	Armaldo, Luiz	Not eligible	Nominated	Evicted (Day 46)																								
Xhonatan	Not in House					Exempt	Efi, Luiz	Evicted (Day 36)	Efi, Tea	Re-Evicted (Day 43)														Comeback housemate	Re-Evicted (Day 43)											
Bjordi	Not in House			Exempt	Luiz, Ronaldo	Dea Mishel	Armaldo, Kiara	Not eligible	Evicted (Day 39)																											
Eni	Not in House			Exempt	Olta, Ronaldo	Nominated	Evicted (Day 32)																	Comeback housemate	Evicted (Day 32)											
Kejvina	Efi & Mikela, Gent	Nominated	Gent, Olta	No; Nominations	Luiz, Ronaldo	Ejected (Day 25)																														
Mikela	Ariana, Ronaldo	Nominated	Armaldo, Krist	Nominated	Evicted (Day 22)																			Comeback housemate	Evicted (Day 22)											
Gent	Efi & Mikela, Ronaldo	Nominated	Amos, Olta	Evicted (Day 18)																				Comeback housemate	Evicted (Day 18)											
Herion	Armaldo, Efi & Mikela	Nominated	Evicted (Day 15)																																	
Ariana	Efi & Mikela, Gent	Evicted (Day 11)																																		
Zhaklina	Efi & Mikela, Gent	Walked (Day 9)																																		
Notes	1	2	none	3	4	5, 6	7, 8, 9	10, 11	12	13	14	15, 16, 17	15, 18, 19, 20, 21	22, 23	24, 25, 26	27, 28	28, 29, 30	31, 29, 32, 33	34	none	35	36, 37	38, 39	40	41	42	43	44	45, 46, 47, 48	49	50	none			51	
Against public vote	Ariana, Armaldo, Efi & Mikela, Gent	All housemates	Armaldo, Gent, Olta	Dea Mishel, Kiara, Luiz, Mikela	Efi, Krist, Luiz, Olta, Ronaldo	Eni, Krist, Olta, Tea	Armaldo, Efi, Luiz, Xhonatan	Armaldo, Bjordi, Efi, Tea	Efi, Luiz, Xhonatan	Efi, Kiara, Luiz	Amos, Armaldo, Dea Mishel, Diola, Kiara, Luiz, Nita, Olta, Tea, Valbona	Dea Mishel, Olta, Tea	Armaldo, Dea Mishel, Diola, Krist, Nita	Bledi, Kiara, Luiz	Armaldo, Dea Mishel, Krist, Olta, Tan	Beati, Dea Mishel, Kiara, Luiz, Olta	Armaldo, Ermiona, Nita	Armaldo, Krist, Olta	Antoneta, Elvis, Luiz, Shpat	Antoneta, Armaldo, Dea Mishel, Fotini, Nita, Sabian, Qetsor	Armaldo, Krist, Luiz	Kiara, Olta	Antoneta, Keisi, Qetsor	Bledi, Efi, Eni, Gent, Kiara, Mikela, Ronaldo, Shpat, Valbona, Xhonatan	Elvis, Fotini, Gerti, Keisi, Krist, Lorenc, Luiz, Nita, Qetsor	Efi, Gerti, Kiara, Lorenc, Qetsor	Bledi, Efi, Kiara, Ronaldo	Bledi, Elvis, Jori, Keisi, Luiz, Nita, Qetsor	Dea Mishel, Elvis, Jori, Nita, Qetsor	Dea Mishel, Luiz	Bledi, Efi, Kiara, Qetsor	Dea Mishel, Jori, Krist, Nita, Qetsor	Dea Mishel, Krist, Nita, Qetsor	Krist, Nita, Qetsor	Dea Mishel, Efi, Krist, Luiz	
Ejected	none				Kejvina	none											Ermiona, Eva	none																		
Walked	none	Zhaklina	none											Bledi	Valbona	none		Tan	none					Olta		none	Lorenc	none								
Evicted	Ariana; Most votes to evict	Herion; Fewest votes to save	Gent; Fewest votes to save	Mikela; Fewest votes to save	Ronaldo; Fewest votes to save	Eni; Fewest votes to save	Xhonatan; Fewest votes to save	Bjordi; Fewest votes to save	Xhonatan; Fewest votes to save	Efi; Most votes to evict	Amos; Fewest votes to save	Tea; Most votes to evict	Diola; Fewest votes to save	Eviction cancelled	Eviction cancelled	Beati; Fewest votes to save	Eviction cancelled	Krist; Most votes to evict	Shpat; Fewest votes to save	Sabian; Fewest votes to save	Armaldo; Most votes to evict	Kiara; Most votes to evict	Antoneta; Fewest votes to save	Efi; Most votes to return	Fotini; Fewest votes to save	Gerti; Fewest votes to save	Ronaldo; Fewest votes to save	Keisi; Fewest votes to save	Elvis; Fewest votes to save	Luiz; Most votes to be finalist	Efi; Most votes to be finalist	Jori; Fewest votes to save	Dea Mishel; Most votes to be finalist	Krist; Most votes to be finalist	Dea Mishel; Fewest votes (out of 4)	Efi; Fewest votes (out of 3)
Evicted	Ariana; Most votes to evict	Herion; Fewest votes to save	Gent; Fewest votes to save	Mikela; Fewest votes to save	Ronaldo; Fewest votes to save	Eni; Fewest votes to save	Xhonatan; Fewest votes to save	Bjordi; Fewest votes to save	Xhonatan; Fewest votes to save	Efi; Most votes to evict	Amos; Fewest votes to save	Tea; Most votes to evict	Diola; Fewest votes to save	Eviction cancelled	Eviction cancelled	Beati; Fewest votes to save	Eviction cancelled	Krist; Most votes to evict	Shpat; Fewest votes to save	Sabian; Fewest votes to save	Armaldo; Most votes to evict	Kiara; Most votes to evict	Antoneta; Fewest votes to save	Kiara; Most votes to return	Fotini; Fewest votes to save	Gerti; Fewest votes to save	Ronaldo; Fewest votes to save	Keisi; Fewest votes to save	Elvis; Fewest votes to save	Luiz; Most votes to be finalist	Efi; Most votes to be finalist	Jori; Fewest votes to save	Dea Mishel; Most votes to be finalist	Krist; Most votes to be finalist	Dea Mishel; Fewest votes (out of 4)	Efi; Fewest votes (out of 3)
Evicted	Ariana; Most votes to evict	Herion; Fewest votes to save	Gent; Fewest votes to save	Mikela; Fewest votes to save	Ronaldo; Fewest votes to save	Eni; Fewest votes to save	Xhonatan; Fewest votes to save	Bjordi; Fewest votes to save	Xhonatan; Fewest votes to save	Efi; Most votes to evict	Amos; Fewest votes to save	Tea; Most votes to evict	Diola; Fewest votes to save	Eviction cancelled	Eviction cancelled	Beati; Fewest votes to save	Eviction cancelled	Krist; Most votes to evict	Shpat; Fewest votes to save	Sabian; Fewest votes to save	Armaldo; Most votes to evict	Kiara; Most votes to evict	Antoneta; Fewest votes to save	Bledi; Most votes to return	Fotini; Fewest votes to save	Gerti; Fewest votes to save	Ronaldo; Fewest votes to save	Keisi; Fewest votes to save	Elvis; Fewest votes to save	Luiz; Most votes to be finalist	Kiara; Fewest votes to be finalist	Jori; Fewest votes to save	Dea Mishel; Most votes to be finalist	Qetsor; Fewest votes to be finalist	Krist; Fewest votes (out of 2)	Luiz; Most votes to win
Evicted	Ariana; Most votes to evict	Herion; Fewest votes to save	Gent; Fewest votes to save	Mikela; Fewest votes to save	Ronaldo; Fewest votes to save	Eni; Fewest votes to save	Xhonatan; Fewest votes to save	Bjordi; Fewest votes to save	Xhonatan; Fewest votes to save	Efi; Most votes to evict	Amos; Fewest votes to save	Tea; Most votes to evict	Diola; Fewest votes to save	Eviction cancelled	Eviction cancelled	Beati; Fewest votes to save	Eviction cancelled	Krist; Most votes to evict	Shpat; Fewest votes to save	Sabian; Fewest votes to save	Armaldo; Most votes to evict	Kiara; Most votes to evict	Antoneta; Fewest votes to save	Ronaldo; Most votes to return	Fotini; Fewest votes to save	Gerti; Fewest votes to save	Ronaldo; Fewest votes to save	Keisi; Fewest votes to save	Elvis; Fewest votes to save	Luiz; Most votes to be finalist	Bledi; Fewest votes to be finalist	Jori; Fewest votes to save	Dea Mishel; Most votes to be finalist	Nita; Fewest votes to be finalist	Krist; Fewest votes (out of 2)	Luiz; Most votes to win

=== Notes ===
- ^Note 1: On Day 4, the viewers voted for their favorite housemate. Zhaklina had the most votes, while Ariana, Armaldo, Efi & Mikela, Gent, Herion and Ronaldo had the fewest votes and were the nominees to be nominated for eviction. The four housemates with the most votes were nominated for eviction.
- ^Note 2: Due to the housemates breaking the rules, Big Brother decided all housemates would be up for elimination.
- ^Note 3: On Day 18, the viewers voted for their favorite housemate. The four housemates with the fewest votes, were up for elimination.
- ^Note 4: Bjordi, Diola, Eni and Nita, as the new housemates had immunity.
- ^Note 5: Each housemate had to save another housemate through a saving chain. Armaldo began to choose, as he was the Head of Household. Eni, Krist, Olta and Tea were the last housemates standing, as they were not saved, and thus became the nominees.
- ^Note 6: Efi and Luiz won in a game and send in the Baby Room and were exempt from the saving chain. Also Xhonatan, as the new housemate was exempt from the saving chain.
- ^Note 7: As punishment for sharing information from the outside into the house, Xhonatan was automatically nominated.
- ^Note 8: Valbona, as the new housemate had immunity, but could vote.
- ^Note 9: Xhonatan was evicted by the public, but he was revealed to have picked the Return Ticket, therefore he went back into the House.
- ^Note 10: On Day 36, Armaldo was being tempted by the Pandora's Box, and he choose to open the box. The good consequence was: 2 VIP Tickets (awarded from Digitalb) for a football match of his choice, while the bad consequence was: he must vote for four housemates, who were not allowed to vote.
- ^Note 11: During the live eviction show, the housemate played a game and the winner had immunity. Bjordi won the game and gave the reward to Diola, so she had immunity.
- ^Note 12: This week, 7 Housemates chosen by a random drawn will vote in a face-to-face vote, while the remaining 6 will cast their vote privately in the Diary Room.
- ^Note 13: On Day 43, Dea Mishel, after winning on a game with questions, Big Brother gave her the power to nominate 3 housemates for elimination. Efi, Kiara and Luiz were the nominees.
- ^Note 14: On Day 43, Krist was being tempted by the Pandora's Box, and he choose to open the box. The good consequence was: to meet his father, while the bad consequence was: all the other housemates where up for elimination.
- ^Note 15: Bledi, Keisi and Tan, as the new housemates had immunity.
- ^Note 16: On Day 46, the viewers voted for their favorite housemate. Armaldo and Luiz had the most votes, and had immunity.
- ^Note 17: On Day 46, Kiara was being tempted by the Pandora's Box, and she choose to open the box. The good consequence was: won two free trip tickets by Savatours to Maldives, while the bad consequence was: Kiara had the power to put on nominations 3 names to get evicted on Saturday, on which the 3 names she chose were: Dea Mishel, Olta and Tea.
- ^Note 18: Beati and Ermiona, as the new housemates had immunity.
- ^Note 19: The viewers voted for their favorite housemate. Luiz and Olta had the most votes and had immunity.
- ^Note 20: As punishment for talking for the nominations, Armaldo, Krist, Luiz and Olta could not vote.
- ^Note 21: This week, 5 Housemates chosen by a random drawn, their nominations counted twice.
- ^Note 22: Olta, after winning in a game, had the power to put 3 housemates up for elimination, on which the 3 housemates she chose were: Bledi, Kiara and Luiz.
- ^Note 23: Due to Bledi's walking from the House on Day 60, the eviction on Day 60 was cancelled.
- ^Note 24: Each housemate had to save another housemate through a saving chain. Valbona began to choose, as she was the Head of Household. Dea Mishel, Krist and Olta, were the last housemates standing, as they were not saved, and thus became the nominees.
- ^Note 25: Valbona, as the Head of Household, Big Brother gave her the power to save two from the nominees, Dea Mishel, Krist or Olta, or could put more two housemates on nomination. She chose to put also Armaldo and Tan on nomination.
- ^Note 26: Due to Valbona's walking from the House on Day 61, the eviction on Day 64 was cancelled.
- ^Note 27: Beati, Dea Mishel, Kiara, Luiz and Olta, after losing on a game, were automatically nominated.
- ^Note 28: Eva, as the new housemate had immunity.
- ^Note 29: Shpat, as the new housemate had immunity.
- ^Note 30: The viewers voted for their favorite housemate. Dea Mishel, Kiara, Luiz and Olta had the most votes and had immunity, while Armaldo, Ermiona, Keisi, Krist, Nita and Tan had the fewest votes and were the nominees to be nominated for eviction. The three housemates with the most votes were nominated for eviction.
- ^Note 31: On Day 71, Luiz was being tempted by the Pandora's Box, and he choose to open the box. The good consequence was: to meet two friends of him, while the bad consequence was: Luiz had the power to put on nominations 3 housemates to get evicted on Tuesday, on which the 3 names he chose were: Armaldo, Krist and Olta.
- ^Note 32: Antoneta, Fotini, Jori, Sabian and Qetsor, as the new housemates had immunity.
- ^Note 33: Krist was evicted by the public, but he was revealed to have picked the Return Ticket, therefore he went back into the House.
- ^Note 34: Each housemate had to save another housemate through a saving chain. Kiara began to choose, as she was the Head of Household. Antoneta, Elvis, Luiz and Shpat, were the last housemates standing, as they were not saved, and thus became the nominees.
- ^Note 35: Due to Armaldo, Krist and Luiz breaking the rules, were automatically nominated.
- ^Note 36: On Day 85, Nita was being tempted by the Pandora's Box, and she choose to open the box. The good consequence was: to meet one friend of her, while the bad consequence was: Nita had the power to put on 2 couples against the public vote, on which the 2 couples she chose were: Kiara & Olta and Krist & Qetsor. The couple with the most votes from the public votes, would be nominated for eviction. Kiara & Olta were nominated, having received 86%, with Krist & Qetsor were not nominated, after receiving 14%.
- ^Note 37: Keisi, as the Head of Household had immunity. Also, Lorenc, as the new housemate had immunity.
- ^Note 38: Each housemate had to save another housemate through a saving chain. Jori began to choose, as she was the Head of Household. Antoneta, Keisi and Qetsor, were the last housemates standing, as they were not saved, and thus became the nominees.
- ^Note 39: Dea Mishel, Krist, Luiz and Olta, as the housemates that entered since day 1 had immunity. Also, Lorenc, as the new housemate had immunity.
- ^Note 40: On Week 15, 10 evicted housemates were brought back, where the public voted to choose four of them to go back into the game. Bledi, Efi, Kiara and Ronaldo received the most votes and returned to the game on Day 99.
- ^Note 41: Dea Mishel, as the Head of Household had immunity. Also, she had the power to choose one housemate to have immunity, she choose Jori. Also, Bledi, Efi, Kiara and Ronaldo, as the new housemates had immunity. Then all other housemates were up for elimination.
- ^Note 42: Bledi, after winning a game had immunity. Also, Dea Mishel, Krist and Luiz, as the housemates that entered since day 1 had immunity.
- ^Note 43: Nita, as the Head of Household had the power to put on nominations 4 housemates to get evicted on Tuesday, on which the 4 names she chose were: Bledi, Efi, Kiara and Ronaldo.
- ^Note 44: On Day 109, the housemates voted for who they want to be nominated for eviction, but Big Brother changed this time the rules and the 4 housemates with the most votes had immunity, without telling for this rule to the housemates. The 4 housemates with the most votes were: Dea Mishel, Efi, Kiara and Krist. The housemates with the least votes were automatically nominated for eviction.
- ^Note 45: After a game, Efi as the winner had immunity and Dea Mishel as the loser was automatically nominated for eviction.
- ^Note 46: On Day 113, the viewers voted for their favorite housemate. Efi and Luiz, had the most votes and had immunity.
- ^Note 47: Big Brother gave to Elvis the power, that his nominations counted twice.
- ^Note 48: On Day 113, the housemates voted for who they want to be nominated for eviction, but Big Brother changed this time the rules and the 3 housemates with the most votes had immunity, without telling for this rule to the housemates. The 3 housemates with the most votes were: Bledi, Kiara and Krist. The housemates with the least votes were automatically nominated for eviction.
- ^Note 49: For this round of nominations, the housemates voted for two housemates that they want in the final. The two housemates who were nominated were up for nomination to win a place in the final.
- ^Note 50: On Day 119, the housemates voted for two housemates that they want to be nominated for eviction. For the first time on the show, the nominations were not done in the live shows. The 3 housemates with the most votes were up for elimination. Dea Mishel and Luiz, had immunity because were nominated for the first finalist. On Day 120, before the voting was opened, Big Brother gave to Qetsor the power, as the Head of Household, to be also nominated and could vote between 2 options, that the public to vote to evict or to vote to win a place in the final.
- ^Note 51: At the final round, the public voted for the winner.

== Nominations totals received ==
2-in-1 housemate called 'Efi & Mikela', their nominations counted as one. (Week 1)

	Week 1	Week 2	Week 3		Week 4	Week 5		Week 6		Week 7			Week 8	Week 9		Week 10		Week 11		Week 12		Week 13	Week 14	Week 15			Week 16		Week 17			Week 18			Week 20	Total
Luiz	–	–	1	–	9	–	6	2	6	–	–	–	–	–	–	–	–	–	–	2	–	–	–	–	–	0	–	2	0	4	0	–	–	–	Winner	32
Krist	–	–	4	–	3	–	3	0	0	–	–	–	10	–	–	–	0	–	–	1	–	–	–	–	–	0	–	4	5	3	1	–	–	–	Runner-up	34
Efi	10	–	1	–	3	–	5	4	6	–	Evicted													–	–	8	–	5	0	1	6	–	–	–	Third place	49
Dea Mishel	–	–	1	–	0	–	0	2	0	–	–	–	4	–	–	–	–	–	–	3	–	–	–	–	–	0	–	3	0	4	–	–	–	–	Fourth place	17
Nita	Not in House			–	–	–	0	0	0	–	–	–	4	–	–	–	3	–	–	3	–	–	–	–	–	2	–	1	1	2	1	–	–	–	Evicted	17
Qetsor	Not in House																	–	–	3	–	–	–	–	–	4	–	1	4	0	2	–	–	–	Evicted	14
Jori	Not in House																	–	–	0	–	–	–	–	–	1	–	0	0	0	1	–	Evicted			1
Bledi	Not in House												–	–	Walked									–	–	0	–	2	6	1	3	Evicted				11
Kiara	–	–	0	–	2	–	2	0	0	–	–	–	0	–	–	–	–	–	–	0	–	–	Evicted	–	–	3	–	4	5	2	2	Re-evicted				14
Elvis	Not in House																		–	0	–	–	–	–	–	0	–	0	1	Evicted						1
Keisi	Not in House											–	–	–	–	–	2	–	–	0	–	–	–	–	–	2	–	0	Evicted							2
Ronaldo	3	–	1	–	5	Evicted																		–	–	1	–	Re-evicted								10
Lorenc	Not in House																					–	–	–	–	4	Walked									4
Gerti	Not in House																					–	–	–	–	3	Evicted									3
Fotini	Not in House																	–	–	4	–	–	–	–	–	Evicted										4
Antoneta	Not in House																	–	–	3	–	–	–	Evicted												3
Olta	–	–	5	–	3	–	0	0	0	–	–	–	–	–	–	–	–	–	–	2	–	–	–	Walked												10
Armaldo	5	–	6	–	1	–	5	3	3	–	–	–	8	–	–	–	3	–	–	4	–	Evicted														38
Sabian	Not in House																	–	–	3	Evicted															3
Shpat	Not in House																–	–	–	Evicted																0
Tan	Not in House											–	–	–	–	–	1	Walked																		1
Eva	Not in House															–	–	Ejected																		0
Ermiona	Not in House												–	–	–	–	3	Ejected																		3
Beati	Not in House												–	–	–	–	Evicted																			0
Valbona	Not in House						–	0	0	–	–	–	0	–	–	Walked																				0
Diola	Not in House			–	–	–	4	–	2	–	–	–	4	Evicted																						10
Tea	–	–	0	–	2	–	3	4	3	–	–	–	Evicted																							12
Amos	–	–	1	–	1	–	0	0	0	–	–	Evicted																								2
Xhonatan	Not in House					–	–	Evicted	6	Re-Evicted																										6
Bjordi	Not in House			–	–	–	0	3	Evicted																											3
Eni	Not in House			–	–	–	Evicted																													0
Kejvina	–	–	0	–	1	Ejected																														1
Mikela	10	–	1	–	Evicted																															11
Gent	5	–	5	Evicted																																10
Herion	2	–	Evicted																																	2
Ariana	5	Evicted																																		5
Zhaklina	–	Walked																																		0
